= Ninjago: The Island =

Danish-Canadian animated television miniseries

- The Island poster
- Starring: Sam Vincent; Vincent Tong; Michael Adamthwaite; Brent Miller; Kirby Morrow; Kelly Metzger; Paul Dobson; Kathleen Barr
- No. of episodes: 4

Release
- Original network: Netflix
- Original release: March 7 – March 14, 2021 (Canada)

Season chronology
- ← Previous; Master of the Mountain Next → Seabound

The Island is a miniseries of the animated Ninjago television series (titled Ninjago: Masters of Spinjitzu before the eleventh season). The series was created by Michael Hegner and Tommy Andreasen. The miniseries aired in March 2021, following the thirteenth season titled Master of the Mountain. It is succeeded by Seabound. It consists of four episodes of 11 minutes each, similar to the pilot episodes.

The miniseries follows the storyline of the main ninja characters travelling to an island inhabited by an ancient tribe called the Keepers, who swore to protect an amulet linked to a sea-dwelling creature named Wojira. When Wojira is seemingly awakened from her slumber, the ninja must uncover the truth if they hope to return home safely. The miniseries introduces an artifact called the Storm Amulet, which would return as an important plot element in Seabound, along with Wojira. It also sees the return of Clutch Powers, a character introduced in the eleventh season of the television series.

== Voice cast ==
=== Main ===
- Sam Vincent as Lloyd Garmadon, the Green Ninja
- Vincent Tong as Kai, the red ninja and Elemental Master of Fire
- Michael Adamthwaite as Jay, the blue ninja and Elemental Master of Lightning
- Brent Miller as Zane, the white/titanium ninja and Elemental Master of Ice
- Kirby Morrow as Cole, the black ninja and Elemental Master of Earth
- Kelly Metzger as Nya, the Elemental Master of Water and Kai's sister
- Paul Dobson as Master Wu, the wise teacher of the ninja
- Kathleen Barr as Misako

=== Supporting ===
- Jennifer Hayward as P.I.X.A.L., a female nindroid
- Brian Drummond as Twitchy Tim/Zippy
- Paul Dobson as Chief Mammatus/Cecil Putnam
- Brian Dobson as Ronin
- Ian James Corlett as Clutch Powers
- Sam Vincent as Dwayne

== Release ==
An official poster for The Island was revealed on January 14, 2021, which depicted the ninja characters and an armed totem pole. A sneak peek trailer was released on the Lego YouTube channel on February 5, 2021. This was followed by a full-length official trailer, which was released on February 12, 2021. A short clip introducing the new character Timothy "Twitchy Tim" Batterson was released on March 2, 2021 on YouTube titled Ninjas Meet Twitchy. On May 16, 2021, lead writer Bragi Schut confirmed on Twitter that Seabound is the fourteenth season of the series, but on June 10 of the same year, he clarified that he considers the fourteenth season to be both The Island and Seabound. However, co-creator Tommy Andreasen previously stated on May 18, 2021 that he considers The Island and Seabound to be two different installments.

== Plot ==
An expedition led by Sensei Wu, Misako, Clutch Powers and his assistants goes missing while exploring an uncharted island in the storm belt. The ninja must pick up their trail with the help of Twitchy Tim. Having journeyed to the island years ago, Tim is still scared to go back due to being struck by lightning twelve times on the island. Reluctantly, he agrees to help. After surviving their journey to the island, the ninja begin to explore it, discovering the abandoned expedition camp. (Note: Ninjago, The Island Episode 1 "Uncharted")

While making their way across the island, the ninja unexpectedly befriend a dragon and name it Zippy. They are later ambushed by living stone statues that can channel the ninja's elemental powers. While trying to escape the stone guardians, Nya, Zane, Kai and Cole are captured by hostile islanders named the Keepers and encounter Wu, Misako, and Clutch Powers in captivity. Luckily, Lloyd and Tim manage to escape. When the ninja are taken to meet the Keepers' leader, Chief Mammatus, he accuses them of trying to steal an artefact called the Storm Amulet, which was pried from the head of a giant sea serpent named Wojira, placing the beast into a deep sleep. For thousands of years, the Keepers have upheld a vow to the First Spinjitzu Master to protect the amulet from Wojira. (Note: Ninjago, The Island, Episode 2 "The Keepers of the Amulet")

The ninja are imprisoned, while Jay is taken to an unknown location by the Keepers, who refer to him as "The Gift of Jay". Lloyd finds the Keepers' village and frees the ninja with the help of Zippy. Meanwhile, Clutch Powers tries to steal the amulet, but he and the ninja are recaptured. They have to watch Jay being sacrificed by the Keepers to appease the reawakened spirit of Wojira. (Note: Ninjago, The Island, Episode 3 "The Gift of Jay")

However, when Lloyd finds a wooden tooth, he begins to suspect that Wojira is fake. He informs Chief Mammatus, who tells him that since Wojira returned, the Keepers have been giving away their treasure to appease her. When Jay reaches a hidden cave along the coast, he discovers that it is a secret hideout for thugs who have escaped from Kryptarium Prison and that Ronin came up with the scheme to trick the Keepers into giving him their treasure. While the ninja are battling Ronin's henchmen, Ronin tries to escape but is stopped by Tim, who conquers his fear and crashes into his fake Wojira boat. In the aftermath, Clutch Powers tries to steal the Storm Amulet again, but is stopped by Nya, and the ninja befriend the Keepers. In the final scene, the real Wojira is shown sleeping in a temple at the bottom of the ocean with another amulet on her forehead. (Note: Ninjago, The Island, Episode 4 "The Tooth of Wojira")

== Episodes ==
The episodes have also been alternatively released cut together as a 44-minute special.

No. overall	No. in season	Title	Directed by	Written by	Original release date
161	1	"Uncharted"	Daniel Ife	Bragi Schut	March 7, 2021 (Canada)
After an expedition led by Wu, Misako, Clutch Powers, and his assistants that went missing while exploring an uncharted island in the storm belt, the ninja must pick up their trail with the help of Timothy “Twitchy Tim” Batterson, who ventured to the island once before.
162	2	"The Keepers of the Amulet"	Shane Poettcker	Kevin Burke & Chris "Doc" Wyatt	March 7, 2021 (Canada)
The ninja explore the island where they unexpectedly befriend a dragon and are ambushed by living statues.
163	3	"The Gift of Jay"	Wade Cross	Bragi Schut	March 14, 2021 (Canada)
Nya, Zane, Kai, and Cole are captured by the Keepers and encounter Misako, Wu, and Clutch Powers in captivity. Lloyd and Tim try to rescue them, only to also end up captured. Meanwhile, Jay is taken to an unknown location by Chief Mammatus.
164	4	"The Tooth of Wojira"	Daniel Ife	Kevin Burke & Chris "Doc" Wyatt	March 14, 2021 (Canada)
Jay is sacrificed by the Keepers to the reawakened storm spirit Wojira in order to appease her. The ninja begin to suspect things on the island are not as they seem to be, and uncover the truth behind Wojira's apparent return.
