= Ninjago: Crystalized =

Danish-Canadian animated television season

- Season 15
- Crystalized poster, which spoofs the poster of Avengers: Endgame
- Starring: Sam Vincent; Vincent Tong; Michael Adamthwaite; Brent Miller; Andrew Francis; Kelly Metzger; Paul Dobson; Jennifer Hayward; Mark Oliver; Scott McNeil
- No. of episodes: 30

Release
- Original network: Netflix
- Original release: May 20 – October 1, 2022

Season chronology
- ← Previous; Seabound

Crystalized is the fifteenth and final season of the animated Ninjago television series (titled Ninjago: Masters of Spinjitzu before the eleventh season). The series was created by Michael Hegner and Tommy Andreasen. The season aired in two parts: the first in May 2022, and the other from September to October 2022. Following the passing of Kirby Morrow, Andrew Francis is cast as the new voice actor of Cole.

The storyline of the fifteenth season directly follows on from the preceding season, Seabound. The first part of Crystalized focuses on the ninja attempting to restore Nya to her human form, becoming fugitives in the process. The rest of the season centers around the return of the Overlord as the season main antagonist, under an alias called the Crystal King, as he assembles some of the greatest adversaries from the ninja's past to conquer Ninjago.

A sequel series to support the continuation of the Lego Ninjago brand titled Ninjago: Dragons Rising premiered in June 2023 exclusively on Netflix.

== Voice cast ==
=== Main ===
- Sam Vincent as Lloyd Garmadon, the Green Ninja
- Vincent Tong as Kai, the red ninja and Elemental Master of Fire and Nya's brother
- Michael Adamthwaite as Jay, the blue ninja, Elemental Master of Lightning and Nya's yang/boyfriend
- Brent Miller as Zane, the white/titanium ninja and Elemental Master of Ice
- Andrew Francis as Cole, the black ninja and Elemental Master of Earth
- Kelly Metzger as Nya, the Elemental Master of Water, Kai's sister and Jay's yin/girlfriend
- Paul Dobson as Sensei Wu, the wise teacher of the ninja
- Jennifer Hayward as P.I.X.A.L. a female nindroid, and Zane's love interest
- Mark Oliver as Garmadon
- Scott McNeil as the Overlord/the Crystal King

=== Supporting ===
- Erin Mathews as Miss Demeanor
- Kelly Sheridan as Gayle Gossip
- Michael Donovan as Police Commissioner
- Alan Marriott as Dareth
- Michael Dobson as Pythor P. Chumsworth
- Heather Doerksen as Skylor
- Paul Dobson as Warden Noble
- Adrian Petriw as Fugi-Dove
- Michael Antonakos as The Mechanic
- Brian Drummond as Twitchy Tim
- Deven Mack as King Vangelis
- Britt McKillip as Harumi
- Lee Tockar as Cyrus Borg
- David Raynolds as Nelson
- Shannon Chan Kent as Racer Seven
- Gavin Langelo as Vinny
- Sharon Alexander as Ultra Violet
- Nicholas Holmes as Jake
- Tabitha St. Germain as Sammy
- Brynna Drummond as Antonia
- Brian Dobson as Ronin

== Casting ==
The season features the return of the main cast, who have voiced the ninja characters across the series, excluding Kirby Morrow as the character Cole. Crystalized was the first season to feature Andrew Francis as the character's voice actor. Francis was cast in the role following the loss of Morrow, who had previously voiced the character since the beginning of the series. Series co-creator Tommy Andreasen released an open letter to fans explaining the decision to recast the part of Cole. He stated that several options had been considered regarding the character's future, including retiring the character, using existing dialogue from previous seasons to retain Morrow's voice in the series, creating a story where Cole does not speak, or recasting. The Ninjago team made the ultimate decision to recast the part. Andreasen explained, "We must remain true to the character Kirby shaped. Cole is crucial in the 2022 story and the World and Ninjago need Cole. So, recasting it was! And a very hard and emotional one at that."

Andreasen revealed on Twitter that a new actor voicing a new character would be introduced in the season, which he described as, "one of the weirdest and wonderful ones [the writers] have ever come up with." He also revealed that the character Jake would return in the season, voiced by Nicholas Holmes, and that the character Kai would have, "much love and romance in the year to come."

== Release ==
In January 2021, Tommy Andreasen mentioned the script for the season on Twitter and said that fans would have to wait until 2022 for the season to be released. The Lego Group released several preview clips on its official YouTube channel leading up to the season's premiere, including an official teaser on April 29, 2022, and an official trailer on May 20, 2022. In a France TV Pro press release for the season, which was released in May 2022, an official season poster was revealed that drew comparisons to the design of the theatrical release poster for Avengers: Endgame. The season was scheduled to premiere in France on June 6, 2022. The first twelve English episodes were released online on The Lego Group's YouTube channel on May 20, 2022, with viewing restricted by region but were removed three days later with no explanation, but were made public again on June 1, 2022. On the same day, they were also released on Netflix. It also debuted on CITV in the United Kingdom on June 6, 2022.

A trailer for the second half of the season was revealed during the Lego Con 2022 live show on June 18, 2022. At Comic Con 2022, it was announced that the second half of the season will be released in early October on Netflix. The 13th and 14th episodes, titled A Sinister Shadow and The Spider's Design, respectively, were released earlier on Sky Go in New Zealand on September 18, 2022. Netflix Australia later confirmed the second half of the season would be released on October 1, 2022.

== Plot ==
A group called the New Ninja appear in Ninjago City, fighting vengestone smugglers. The ninja team has lost faith and broken up. (Note: Ninjago, Season 15, Episode 1 "Farewell to Sea") Nya roams the Endless Sea as a water dragon but then begins to recover her memories. She meets a water elemental named Nyad, who helps her to find her way back home. (Note: Ninjago, Season 15, Episode 2 "The Call of Home") The ninja reunite and uncover a secret shipment of vengestone in a subway tunnel. They are forced to fight Miss Demeanor and her thugs, but are shamed when the New Ninja defeat the villains. (Note: Ninjago, Season 15, Episode 3 "The Shape of Nya")

Nya returns to the monastery in her aqueous form and Zane freezes her to maintain her shape. The team decide to break Aspheera out of Kryptarium prison to steal her staff so that Aspheera can drain Nya's elemental power and return her back to human form. Skylor helps to keep Nya frozen while they retrieve Aspheera and the staff. (Note: Ninjago, Season 15, Episode 4 "A Mayor Problem") During their mission, the ninja are forced to fight the New Ninja and Kai accidentally reveals their identities, making them fugitives. (Note: Ninjago, Season 15, Episode 5 "Public Enemies 1, 2, 3, 4 and 5!") Aspheera agrees to help them in exchange for her freedom and returns Nya to her human form. The New Ninja arrive at the monastery and arrest the entire ninja team except for Nya. Aspheera escapes and is recruited by a stranger known as the Crystal King. (Note: Ninjago, Season 15, Episode 6 "A Painful Promise!")

The ninja are sentenced to five years in Kryptarium prison. They find themselves surrounded by their old enemies, including Pythor. Lloyd is visited by the Crystal King's messenger, who warns him that the Crystal King is gathering Lloyd's enemies against him. (Note: Ninjago, Season 15, Episode 7 "Ninjago City vs. Ninja!") When Pythor is recruited by the messenger and broken out of prison, the ninja try to stop him, but fail. (Note: Ninjago, Season 15, Episode 8 "Kryptarium Prison Blues") The ninja eventually escape with the help of Nya, disguised as Samurai X, and Dareth, but find themselves wandering the desert while pursued by sheriff HoundDog McBrag. (Note: Ninjago, Season 15, Episode 9 "Hounddog McBrag") On the road they are picked up by a young singer who is making her way to Ninjago City and Zane learns the benefits of emotions. (Note: Ninjago, Season 15, Episode 10 "The Benefit of Grief") The ninja reunite at Twitchy Tim's gas station, where Fugi-Dove helps them escape from McBrag. They confront The Mechanic in his lair and subdue him, allowing Lloyd to impersonate him at the Council of the Crystal King. (Note: Ninjago, Season 15, Episode 11 "The Fifth Villain") There he meets the other members, who are Aspheera, Pythor, King Vangelis, and Mr. F, but his identity is discovered and he is captured. The Crystal King's messenger reveals herself to be Harumi, whom Lloyd believed to be dead. (Note: Ninjago, Season 15. Episode 12 "The Council of the Crystal King")

Harumi explains that, after her death, (Note: As depicted in Ninjago: Hunted) she was resurrected by the Crystal King and agreed to serve him, even after learning his true identity as the Overlord. Using vengestone bought from Vangelis prior to his defeat by the ninja, (Note: As depicted in Ninjago: Master of the Mountain) Harumi built an army that can negate the ninja's elemental powers. Harumi reveals her plan to steal the Golden Weapons from the monastery and Lloyd vows to stop her. (Note: Ninjago, Season 15. Episode 13 "A Sinister Shadow") Kai, Jay, Zane, and Cole are attacked by explosive Crystal Spiders, trapping them underground. This enrages Lloyd, who believes his friends to be dead, and awakens his previously dormant Oni powers. (Note: Ninjago, Season 15. Episode 14 "The Spider's Design") The Crystal Council (now joined by the Mechanic) attack the monastery, destroying it and taking the Golden Weapons. Wu, Skylor, and P.I.X.A.L. are saved by MiniPix 7, one of P.I.X.A.L.'s miniature robot assistants, while Nya escapes in her Samurai X armour. (Note: Ninjago, Season 15, Episode 15 "The Fall of the Monastery") As Nya rescues the trapped ninja, Aspheera performs a ritual that corrupts the Golden Weapons and allows the Overlord to take physical form once again. (Note: Ninjago, Season 15, Episode 16 "Darkness Within")

The Overlord uses his powers to grant the Crystal Council new abilities, bring the Crystal Army to life, and make the Oni Temple airborne. Lloyd refuses to join and escapes, taking Harumi with him, and they both fall off the temple into the jungle. (Note: Ninjago, Season 15, Episode 17 "The Coming of the King") The ninja head to Primeval's Eye to rescue Lloyd, just as he and Harumi are found by the Crystal Council. Lloyd is forced to abandon Harumi and escape with his friends, informing them of the Overlord's return. (Note: Ninjago, Season 15, Episode 18 "Return to Primeval's Eye") The Crystal Army begins marching towards Ninjago City, corrupting everyone in their path. The ninja try to stop them, but find that their vehicles are being drained by the vengestone . Wu and Lloyd track down Garmadon living in an apartment in Ninjago City. (Note: Ninjago, Season 15, Episode 19 "Crystastrophe") Garmadon reveals that since his departure, (Note: As depicted in Ninjago: March of the Oni) he has started a journey of self-improvement, by caring for a potted plant he called Christofern. He agrees to help the ninja after the Crystal Army destroys his apartment and damages Christofern. (Note: Ninjago, Season 15, Episode 20 "Christofern")

Wu theorizes that the powers of Creation and Destruction are the only things that can harm the Overlord, and reaches out to Misako for research on a powerful Dragon form. Meanwhile, Garmadon tries to teach Lloyd how to master his Oni powers, but he is reluctant to give into his negative emotions. (Note: Ninjago, Season 15, Episode 21 "A Lesson in Anger") After P.I.X.A.L. upgrades the ninja's vehicles to be powered by the crystals instead, they again fight the Crystal Army while Wu confronts the Overlord. The Overlord defeats Wu and unleashes a powerful weapon that crystalizes all of Ninjago City, destroying the ninja's vehicles. (Note: Ninjago, Season 15, Episode 22 "Brave But Foolish") Wu takes shelter with a group of paperkids and he broadcasts a message to inspire others. Nya reawakens her elemental powers to save herself and Jay, and they set out to find help. (Note: Ninjago, Season 15, Episode 23 "Quittin' Time!") HoundDog McBrag finds Garmadon and Lloyd and tries to arrest the latter, but is left speechless after Lloyd saves him from a crystalized Serpentine. P.I.X.A.L. finds a broken Zane (who has returned to his Ice Emperor persona) (Note: As depicted in Ninjago: Secrets of the Forbidden Spinjitzu) and brings him to Borg Tower. (Note: Ninjago, Season 15, Episode 24 "Return of the Ice Emperor") Kai and Cole are rescued by Skylor and join Wu and other refugees at the newspaper warehouse, while Lloyd and Garmadon search for the missing Serpentine. (Note: Ninjago, Season 15, Episode 25 "Safe Haven") Wu re-establishes a communication link with the ninja and they decide to reach out to all their allies for help. Cyrus Borg provides Ronin and his fugitives with mechs and fixes Zane before P.I.X.A.L. restores his memory with an emotional outreach. (Note: Ninjago, Season 15, Episode 26 "Compatible") Nya uses her powers to contact the Merlopians, while Racer 7 escorts Cole across Ninjago City to broadcast a distress call to Shintaro. (Note: Ninjago, Season 15, Episode 27 "Distress Calls")

The ninja regroup at the warehouse and make their final stand against the Crystal Army, while Lloyd and Garmadon confront the Overlord. (Note: Ninjago, Season 15, Episode 28 "An Issue of Trust") Kai, Jay, Zane, and Cole unlock their Dragon forms, defeat the Crystal Council, and restore the Golden Weapons to their original form. The Overlord reveals that he corrupted the Great Devourer in order to make Garmadon evil, (Note: As depicted in Ninjago: Rise of the Snakes) causing Harumi to switch sides to help Lloyd and Garmadon. (Note: Ninjago, Season 15, Episode 29 "Dragon Form") Garmadon is seemingly dead in the process, triggering Lloyd's Oni form, but he resists using his rage to win and reverts back to normal. The ninja combine the Golden Weapons, releasing their elemental powers to form a four-headed golden dragon to prevent the Overlord from stealing, corrupting and absorbing the powers of creation while corrupting the ninja. Lloyd rides the golden dragon and defeats the Overlord for good before escaping the crumbling Oni Temple with Harumi and Garmadon, who faked his death in an effort to unlock Lloyd's Oni form. In the aftermath, the ninja's elemental powers return to their source of origin, Garmadon plants Christofern atop a mountain and the ninja rebuild the monastery alongside their friends and allies. (Note: Ninjago, Season 15, Episode 30 "Roots")

== Episodes ==
No. overall	No. in season	Title	Directed by	Written by	Original release date
181	1	"Farewell the Sea"	Wade Cross	Bragi Schut	May 20, 2022
A year after Nya's sacrifice, the ninja reunite to investigate a vengestone smuggling operation.
182	2	"The Call of Home"	Daniel Ife	Lauren Bradley	May 20, 2022
After saving a sailor from drowning, Nya meets another water elemental Nyad and hatches a plan to regain her humanity.
183	3	"The Shape of Nya"	Shane Poettcker	Kevin Burke & Chris "Doc" Wyatt	May 20, 2022
The ninja investigate the vengestone smuggling ring, but end up fighting among themselves, following a humiliating rescue by the New Ninja.
184	4	"A Mayor Problem"	Wade Cross	Liz Hara	May 20, 2022
When the new mayor refuses to free Aspheera from Kryptarium Prison so that she can save Nya's life, the ninja decide to take matters into their own hands.
185	5	"Public Enemies 1, 2, 3, 4, and 5!"	Daniel Ife	Lizzi Oyebode	May 20, 2022
The ninja go on a chase to retrieve the staff, but a new encounter with the New Ninja betrays their identity.
186	6	"A Painful Promise"	Shane Poettcker	Kevin Burke & Chris "Doc" Wyatt	May 20, 2022
The ninja fight the Mayor's New Ninja while Aspheera helps Nya regain her human form. A new villain recruits Aspheera to their cause.
187	7	"Ninjago City vs. Ninja"	Wade Cross	Bragi Schut	May 20, 2022
The ninja are sent to prison for their crimes, where Lloyd is visited by a mysterious masked messenger who warns him of the Crystal King.
188	8	"Kryptarium Prison Blues"	Daniel Ife	Kevin Burke & Chris "Doc" Wyatt	May 20, 2022
The ninja stumble upon an old enemy in prison and try to prevent his escape while Nya finds reason for hope.
189	9	"Hounddog McBrag"	Shane Poettcker	Bragi Schut	May 20, 2022
Dareth and Nya, as Samurai X, free the ninja. Ninjago's toughest marshal, HoundDog McBrag, is hired by Ninjago City's mad mayor Ulysses Trustable to re-capture the ninja.
190	10	"The Benefit of Grief"	Wade Cross	Bragi Schut	May 20, 2022
A singer, named Sally, is on her way to Ninjago City to help Kai, Zane, and Dareth escape HoundDog McBrag. Zane understands that all emotions matter.
191	11	"The Fifth Villain"	Daniel Ife	Liz Hara	May 20, 2022
The ninja reunite at Twitchy Tim's gas station, escape HoundDog McBrag, and decide to infiltrate the Council of the Crystal King.
192	12	"The Council of the Crystal King"	Shane Poettcker	Bragi Schut	May 20, 2022
Lloyd, in disguise, infiltrates the council of the Crystal King, where he discovers who is hiding behind the kabuki mask.
193	13	"A Sinister Shadow"	Wade Cross	Kevin Burke & Chris "Doc" Wyatt	September 10, 2022
Harumi tells Lloyd her story of how she came to serve the Crystal King and Lloyd learns that the Crystal King's true identity is the resurrected Overlord.
194	14	"The Spider's Design"	Daniel Ife	Lauren Bradley	September 11, 2022
HoundDog McBrag impounds the Destiny's Bounty while the ninja are ambushed by Crystal Spiders which blow up the subway tunnel. Lloyd shows hints of his Oni side.
195	15	"The Fall of the Monastery"	Shane Poettcker	Bragi Schut; Story by : Lauren Bradley & Lizzi Oyebode	September 17, 2022
The Crystal Council attack the monastery to steal the Weapons of Spinjitzu and fight Wu, Nya, Skylor, and P.I.X.A.L. Meanwhile, the trapped ninja search for a way out of the tunnel.
196	16	"Darkness Within"	Wade Cross	Lizzi Oyebode	September 18, 2022
The Crystal Council performs a ritual to crystalize the Weapons of Spinjitzu and awaken the Overlord, while Nya frees the ninja from the subway tunnel.
197	17	"The Coming of the King"	Daniel Ife	Kevin Burke & Chris "Doc" Wyatt	September 24, 2022
The Overlord gives the Crystal Council new powers and makes his temple airborne. He gives Lloyd a chance to join his side, but Lloyd declines and escapes with Harumi.
198	18	"Return to Primeval's Eye"	Shane Poettcker	Bragi Schut	September 25, 2022
Lloyd and Harumi make their way through Primeval's Eye while the Crystal Council searches for them. The ninja retrieve their vehicles from the impound and manage to find and rescue Lloyd.
199	19	"Crystastrophe"	Wade Cross	Kevin Burke & Chris "Doc" Wyatt	October 1, 2022
The ninja clash with the Vengestone army only to have their vehicles drained by the crystals. Lloyd and Wu track down warnings of this event, which lead them to Garmadon.
200	20	"Christofern"	Daniel Ife	Bragi Schut	October 1, 2022
Garmadon returns and tells Lloyd and Wu about his recent journey of self-improvement, having learned compassion by caring for a plant he named Christofern.
201	21	"A Lesson in Anger"	Shane Poettcker	Kevin Burke & Chris "Doc" Wyatt	October 1, 2022
As Garmadon tries to teach Lloyd how to master his Oni form, Master Wu theorizes there is an opposite Dragon form and reaches out to Misako for research. Meanwhile, P.I.X.A.L. upgrades the ninja's vehicles to withstand the power of the crystals.
202	22	"Brave But Foolish"	Wade Cross	Kevin Burke & Chris "Doc" Wyatt	October 1, 2022
The ninja drive through Ninjago City in their new vehicles and clash with the Crystal Warriors. Meanwhile, Wu faces the Crystal King but is unable to prevent him from unleashing a powerful weapon that crystalizes Ninjago City.
203	23	"Quittin' Time!"	Daniel Ife	Bragi Schut	October 1, 2022
Master Wu parachutes after being blown away from the Crystal Temple and is rescued by Nelson and Antonia. Jay and Nya escape the wreckage of the Destiny's Bounty.
204	24	"Return of the Ice Emperor"	Shane Poettcker	Kevin Burke & Chris "Doc" Wyatt	October 1, 2022
Lloyd and Garmadon escape HoundDog McBrag by going into the sewers where Lloyd saves McBrag from a crystal-infected Serpentine. Misako confirms that the Dragon Form exists. P.I.X.A.L. finds a broken Zane, who has returned to his Ice Emperor persona due to his damaged memory, and takes him to Borg Tower with the help of Ronin and his fugitives.
205	25	"Safe Haven"	Wade Cross	Bragi Schut	October 1, 2022
Skylor saves Kai and Cole from Pythor and they take shelter in an arcade where they run into Jake. Meanwhile, Lloyd and Garmadon search for their potential Serpentine allies.
206	26	"Compatible"	Daniel Ife	Kevin Burke & Chris "Doc" Wyatt	October 1, 2022
Kai and Skylor bond over cooking for refugees. The ninja re-establish communications and decide to reach out to all their allies for help. Cyrus Borg provides Ronin's fugitives with mechs and fixes Zane before P.I.X.A.L. restores his memory with an emotional outreach.
207	27	"Distress Calls"	Shane Poettcker	Kevin Burke & Chris "Doc" Wyatt	October 1, 2022
Racer 7 drives Cole and Vinny across Ninjago City to help the civilians and broadcast a distress signal to Shintaro. Meanwhile, Lloyd gives Garmadon a chance to prove he has changed.
208	28	"An Issue of Trust"	Wade Cross	Bragi Schut	October 1, 2022
The ninja prepare to make their last stand against the Crystal Army as Lloyd and Garmadon plan to ambush the Overlord. However, Garmadon fears that his son does not trust him.
209	29	"Dragon Form"	Daniel Ife	Bragi Schut	October 1, 2022
Lloyd and Garmadon fight the Overlord while the ninja strike back at the Crystal Army with old allies and new powers.
210	30	"Roots"	Shane Poettcker	Bragi Schut	October 1, 2022
The ninja show their true potential and perform a selfless act to defeat the Overlord and save Ninjago once and for all.

== See also ==
- Lego Ninjago
