= Ninjago: Prime Empire =

Danish-Canadian animated television season

- Season 12
- Prime Empire poster
- Starring: Sam Vincent; Vincent Tong; Michael Adamthwaite; Brent Miller; Kirby Morrow; Kelly Metzger; Paul Dobson; Jennifer Hayward; Dean Redman
- No. of episodes: 16

Release
- Original network: Cartoon Network
- Original release: July 19 – August 30, 2020

Season chronology
- ← Previous; Secrets of the Forbidden Spinjitzu Next → Master of the Mountain

Prime Empire is the twelfth season of the animated Ninjago television series (titled Ninjago: Masters of Spinjitzu before the eleventh season). The series was created by Michael Hegner and Tommy Andreasen. The season aired from July 19 to August 30, 2020, following the eleventh season titled Secrets of the Forbidden Spinjitzu. It is succeeded by the thirteenth season titled Master of the Mountain.

The theme of the twelfth season is video games, with the introduction of a fictional video game world in the Ninjago universe named "Prime Empire". The plot follows the main ninja characters as they search for the video game's creator following its re-emergence in Ninjago City. When players begin getting trapped inside the game, including the main character Jay, the ninja must enter the game to find their friend. The storyline involves the ninja characters having to compete in various games within Prime Empire before facing the main game boss named Unagami.

== Voice cast ==
=== Main ===
- Sam Vincent as Lloyd Garmadon, the Green Ninja
- Vincent Tong as Kai, the red ninja and Elemental Master of Fire
- Michael Adamthwaite as Jay, the blue ninja and Elemental Master of Lightning, and Nya's Yang.
- Brent Miller as Zane, the white/titanium ninja and Elemental Master of Ice a male nindroid
- Kirby Morrow as Cole, the black ninja and Elemental Master of Earth
- Kelly Metzger as Nya, the Elemental Master of Water and Kai's sister, and Jay's Yin.
- Paul Dobson as Sensei Wu, the wise teacher of the ninja
- Jennifer Hayward as P.I.X.A.L., a female nindroid
- Dean Redman as Unagami

=== Supporting ===
- Mark Hildreth as Milton Dyer/Game Voice
- Michael Antonakos as the Mechanic
- Adrian Petriw as Scott/Fugi-Dove
- Alessandro Juliani as Okino/Shifty
- Shannon Chan-Kent as Racer Seven/Hostess
- Michael Donovan as Police Commissioner
- Sharon Alexander as Ultra Violet
- Paul Dobson as Warden Noble
- Bill Newton as Fred Finely
- Lee Tockar as Cyrus Borg
- Alan Marriott as Dareth
- Colin Murdock as Bob the Intern
- Sam Vincent as Ritchie
- Mary Black as Mrs Dyer
- Vincent Tong as Sushi Chef
- Michael Daingerfield as Tony the Bartender
- Zion Simpson as Child Unagami

== Development ==
Co-creator Tommy Andreasen stated on Twitter that Prime Empire was inspired by the urban legend Polybius, a fictitious 1980s arcade game.

== Release ==
A 30-second teaser trailer was released on February 5, 2020 on the Lego YouTube channel to promote the season. This was followed by the release of an official trailer on 10 March 2020. The season premiered on Cartoon Network on July 19, 2020 with the first episode titled Would You Like to Enter Prime Empire? The subsequent episodes were released throughout July and August 2020 until the release of the season finale titled Game Over on August 30 of the same year.

== Plot ==
When the old, legendary video game Prime Empire resurfaces, players begin to disappear into the game, including Jay (who loves playing video games). (Note: Ninjago, Season 12, Episode 1 "Would You Like to Enter Prime Empire?") The ninja discover that the game's creator, Milton Dyer, has also disappeared and nobody has seen him for years. (Note: Ninjago, Season 12, Episode 2 "Dyer Island") With the suspicion that Dyer is a villain named Unagami, Lloyd, Cole, Kai and Nya enter the virtual world of Prime Empire to stop Dyer's avatar, while Zane and P.I.X.A.L. remain outside to find Dyer in the real world. (Note: Ninjago, Season 12, Episode 3 "Level Thirteen") They meet "The League of Jay", a group of Jay fans who lead them to a player named Scott. He explains that players only get four lives in the game and after losing their last life, they are turned into digital cubes and disappear. (Note: Ninjago, Season 12, Episode 4 "Superstar Rockin' Jay") Inside one of the game zones, a Samurai named Okino faces a crisis of faith when he repeatedly fails to lead a series of Masters to victory, causing him to lose all hope - until some familiar ninja arrive. (Note: Ninjago, Season 12, Episode 5 "I am Okino") In order to stop Unagami, the ninja must obtain three Key-tanas, the first of which is hidden in the game zone Terra Karana - one of Prime Empire's most dangerous game environments. (Note: Ninjago, Season 12, Episode 6 "The Glitch") While being chased by Unagami's dreaded Red Visors the ninja must climb the 'Cliffs of Hysteria', however, they make a startling discovery: Unagami is converting players into energy cubes in order to build a portal into the real world! (Note: Ninjago, Season 12, Episode 7 "The Cliffs of Hysteria") Once reunited with Jay, the ninja travel across three game zones to obtain three Key-Tanas, which unlock the final challenge at the Temple of Madness. On the journey, they are hunted by Unagami's digital troops, the Red Visors. In the first game zone, Terra Karana, the ninja meet a non-player character (NPC) called Okino, who helps them through many deadly challenges. In the boss battle, the ninja win the fight against the Red Dragon to obtain the purple Key-Tana. (Note: Ninjago, Season 12, Episode 8 "The Maze of the Red Dragon") The ninja learn that the only way to acquire the 2nd Key-tana is by winning a race in Terra Technica and have to find racing cars in unexpected ways. (Note: Ninjago, Season 12, Episode 9 "One Step Forward, Two Steps Back") The yellow Key-Tana is obtained by winning the Speedway Five-Billion, a dangerous race in the second game zone, Terra Technica. Lloyd recruits Racer Seven, another NPC, but she is followed by the Red Visors. (Note: Ninjago, Season 12, Episode 10 "Racer Seven") Scott sacrifices himself to help the ninja escape and is transformed into a digital cube. The ninja manage to win the Speedway Five-Billion, but Kai and Cole are both cubed during the race. (Note: Ninjago, Season 12, Episode 11 "The Speedway Five-Billion") Lloyd, Jay and Nya continue their journey to obtain the final Key-tana in the third game zone, Terra Domina. There Lloyd is forced to battle an avatar of Harumi. He defeats her and obtains the orange Key-Tana, but is cubed in the process. (Note: Ninjago, Season 12, Episode 12 "Stop, Drop and Side Scroll")

In the real world, Zane discovers the location of Dyer, only to get captured by the Mechanic. (Note: Ninjago, Season 12, Episode 13 "Ninjago Confidential") When P.I.X.A.L. finds Dyer, he reveals that Scott was a test player who became trapped inside the game (which was named Unagami), when Dyer requested that Scott receive an intense gaming experience. Dyer shut the game down, but Unagami survived. Zane is forced to give the Prime Empire motherboard to the Mechanic, who uses it to create a portal from the game into the real world. (Note: Ninjago, Season 12, Episode 14 "The Prodigal Father")

In Prime Empire, Jay and Nya reach a digital sushi restaurant in the Temple of Madness, but Nya is cubed after being defeated by an NPC called Sushimi. After reaching the final level, Jay confronts Unagami, who transforms himself into the Empire Dragon. Jay follows him through the portal into the real world by riding on his Cyber Dragon. (Note: Ninjago, Season 12, Episode 15 "The Temple of Madness") Back in the real world, Jay lures Unagami to the top of Borg Tower. Dyer apologises to Unagami, who forgives him. He agrees to release all the players and NPCs who are trapped inside the game. Unagami, who is now a child, and Dyer are finally reunited. (Note: Ninjago, Season 12, Episode 16 "Game Over")

== Episodes ==
| No. overall | No. in season | Title | Directed by | Written by | Original release date | U.S. viewers (millions) |
|---|---|---|---|---|---|---|
| 129 | 1 | "Would You Like to Enter Prime Empire?" | Wade Cross | Alisha Brophy & Scott Miles | July 19, 2020 | 0.28 |
The Mechanic and his henchmen infiltrate an old electronics warehouse in search of a mysterious motherboard. The ninja learn of the heist and arrive to thwart the attack. But they're completely in the dark as to what the Mechanic wants with it, so they head to the Mechanic's headquarters looking for clues. There, the ninja find the legendary, unreleased arcade game called Prime Empire. Realizing the game is missing a motherboard, Jay inserts the motherboard and the game boots up. While Jay plays the game, the other ninja make their way into the Mechanic's private office where they intercept a phone call intended for the Mechanic. It's a mysterious new villain called Unagami, for whom the Mechanic seems to be working. Meanwhile, Jay accidentally triggers an energy pulse that converts all of the arcade games in Ninjago City into Prime Empire arcade games.
| 130 | 2 | "Dyer Island" | Daniel Ife | Alisha Brophy & Scott Miles | July 19, 2020 | 0.23 |
When the ninja discover that Jay has disappeared into the arcade game, they interrogate the Mechanic, hoping to learn who the mysterious Unagami is and how they can get Jay back. But the Mechanic refuses to speak. While they are at the police station, they learn from the Commissioner that something strange has affected all the arcade games in Ninjago City, turning them into Prime Empire ones. Fearing that whoever plays them will disappear like Jay, the ninja urge the Commissioner to pull the cabinets out of the arcade games. As the police rush to comply, the ninja head off to Dyer Island, an island outside Ninjago City, where they hope to find Milton Dyer, the creator of Prime Empire. On Dyer Island, the ninja instead meet Bob the Intern, who used to work for Dyer. Bob explains that Prime Empire was a project that was shut down by the company Dyer worked for because it was too dangerous, and that Milton Dyer vowed to get revenge on the gaming industry afterward. The ninja then conclude that Dyer must be Unagami.
| 131 | 3 | "Level Thirteen" | Shane Poettcker | Alisha Brophy & Scott Miles | July 19, 2020 | 0.22 |
More and more people are disappearing in Ninjago City, while the ninja scramble to unlock the secrets of the Prime Empire arcade game. They decide to take the game to Cyrus Borg, hoping he can help them decode the programming and release all the players who have been taken (including Jay). Meanwhile, the Mechanic and his henchmen are resting in Kryptarium Prison when the jail's security systems begin acting up. Unagami hacks the security system and releases the prisoners, ordering them to get the Prime Empire arcade game back from the ninja. Mechanic, Ultra Violet, and Captain Soto escape, rush to Borg Tower and begin their assault, fighting their way past the building's security systems to reach the 100th floor. Borg tells the ninja that there is only one way to release the trapped players - by stopping Unagami. Cole plays the arcade game and tries to reach Level Thirteen. He does successfully, and the ninja enter the game.
| 132 | 4 | "Superstar Rockin' Jay" | Wade Cross | Kevin Burke & Chris "Doc" Wyatt | July 19, 2020 | 0.23 |
The ninja materialize inside Prime Empire and go immediately on the run when they discover a squadron of Red Visors waiting for them! They are pursued through a marketplace by the Red Visors and are cornered. Luckily, a group of rebels called the League of Jays arrives to save them. The ninja are initially confused but soon discover that during Jay's time in the game, he amassed a following of fans who have devoted themselves to his "teachings". The League of Jays helps the ninja escape from the Red Visors and leads them to Scott, the race car mechanic. As they cross the marketplace, the ninja make several discoveries. They learn that their ninja skills don't work in this digital world. Skills can only be bought or earned by playing the game. They then learn they have four lives, and when they lose those lives, they will be converted into energy cubes and whisked away by flying drones.
| 133 | 5 | "I am Okino" | Daniel Ife | Kevin Burke & Chris "Doc" Wyatt | July 26, 2020 | 0.23 |
Okino is a serious, duty-bound Samurai warrior who is unaware that Prime Empire is a game, since he is part of it. His job is to lead players through the three dangers of Terra Karana - the Forest of Discontent, the Cliffs of Hysteria and the Maze of the Red Dragon where the first Key-tana is located. Unfortunately, the game is rigged to be nearly impossible and Okino quickly fails his masters, who are dematerialized into cubes of energy. As more and more masters are "cubed", Okino begins to lose faith in his abilities. One day, Okino meets another Samurai like himself who is more successful in keeping her master alive. Okino internalizes this as a fault of his own so he trains and pushes himself as never before. Despite all his efforts, he loses more masters. Okino prepares to abandon his responsibilities when a final group of travellers arrive, seeking his help. It is the ninja.
| 134 | 6 | "The Glitch" | Shane Poettcker | Bragi Schut | July 26, 2020 | 0.23 |
The Samurai guide, Okino, leads the ninja into the first of Terra Karana's deadly challenges: The Forest of Discontent, made up of deep, dark woods, filled with booby-traps. As the ninja fight their way through it, they begin losing lives, but with Okino's help, they survive and reach the middle of the forest. There, they are ambushed by the Whack Rats but the ninja are able to fight them off. Lloyd ties up the leader, a rat named Richie. In order to procure his release, Richie tells Lloyd that he knows about a "glitch" in the game, which will allow the ninja to bypass the rest of the booby-traps and reach the other side of the Forest. Okino soon realizes Prime Empire is not a real place, merely a simulation and he is part of it. Lloyd releases Ritchie, who guides the ninja to the glitch and into an ambush by Red Visors. Okino comes to their rescue and helps the ninja escape.
| 135 | 7 | "The Cliffs of Hysteria" | Wade Cross | Bragi Schut | August 2, 2020 | 0.14 |
The ninja arrive at the Cliffs of Hysteria where they meet Shifty, a merchant who runs a table at the base of the cliffs. Shifty sells the ninja some grappling hooks and rope. Unfortunately, the ninja don't have enough money to buy the "Rope of Supreme Durability" and opt instead for the "Rope of Questionable Integrity". Even worse, as they are buying the rope, they are spotted by one of Unagami's aerial drones. A squadron of Red Visors quickly arrives and pursues the ninja up the cliffs. The ninja, who only have ropes, must climb while the Red Visors have jet-boots and are able to catch up quickly. During the ensuing battle, Cole is nearly lost, but is saved at the last moment by Kai, who makes a daring leap onto the back of the flying drone and uses the drone to blast the Red Visors. They learn that Unagami is using the energy cubes to build a portal into Ninjago City.
| 136 | 8 | "The Maze of the Red Dragon" | Daniel Ife | Kevin Burke & Chris "Doc" Wyatt | August 2, 2020 | 0.17 |
As the ninja and Okino approach the Maze of the Red Dragon, Unagami uses his control over Prime Empire to briefly "pause" all the players except Okino. He appears before Okino, urging Okino to betray the ninja and not help them against the fearsome Red Dragon that awaits the ninja at the heart of the maze. If Okino betrays them, Unagami promises to bring him with into the real world. He then disappears and restores the ninja back to normal. The ninja arrive at the heart of the maze and find themselves outmatched by the Red Dragon, and appeal to Okino for help. Okino struggles with his decision but cannot in good conscience betray the ninja. He defies Unagami, his creator, and helps the ninja defeat the Red Dragon by revealing its weakness: a scale on its chest. The ninja defeat the dragon and Jay delivers the final blow. The Red Dragon changes colour and vanishes into an amulet. The ninja then continue their quest.
| 137 | 9 | "One Step Forward, Two Steps Back" | Shane Poettcker | Alisha Brophy & Scott Miles | August 9, 2020 | 0.20 |
Having obtained the first Key-tana, the ninja enter the second of Prime Empire's game zones, Terra Technica, where they learn that the second Key-tana can only be won by winning a dangerous race called the Speedway Five-Billion. The ninja realize that they don't have enough game credits to enter the race but earn credits when Jay and Nya win a dance competition. The dance competition starts to go smoothly, but Jay and Nya begin to realize that the blue haired couple who threaten them earlier begin to cheat their way to victory when they kick their competition out and this makes Nya and Jay aware of their rivals cheating antics. Red visors soon arrive and while the ninja are fighting them off, Jay and Nya use them to gain advantage of this and end up earning them more points and messing up the rivals moves. Jay and Nya perform one more dance move and win the dance competition. The ninja then head to Scott's garage for cars.
| 138 | 10 | "Racer Seven" | Wade Cross | Bragi Schut | August 9, 2020 | 0.21 |
The ninja appeal to Scott for help in obtaining 5 race cars. Scott shows them his junkyard where he has 5 vehicles that may be repairable in time. Lloyd heads off to the racetrack and watches a live race, hoping to learn as much as he can about the brutal Speedway Five-Billion. One driver in particular impresses Lloyd - a race car driver known as 'Racer Seven'. Lloyd recruits her to help them win the race.
| 139 | 11 | "The Speedway Five-Billion" | Daniel Ife | Bragi Schut | August 16, 2020 | 0.25 |
Red Visors discover the location of Scott's garage and Scott sacrifices himself to buy the ninja a chance to escape and they race off. The ninja enter the Speedway Five-Billion in the nick of time, just as the race is starting, and find themselves quickly overwhelmed. Cole and Kai bravely sacrifice themselves to buy their teammates a chance to win. With the help of Racer Seven, however, they successfully win the second Key-tana.
| 140 | 12 | "Stop, Drop and Side Scroll" | Shane Poettcker | Alisha Brophy & Scott Miles | August 16, 2020 | 0.22 |
Devastated by the loss of Cole and Kai, the surviving ninja push on into Prime Empire's third and final game zone - Terra Domina. They ultimately arrive at the upper-most level where Unagami's voice tells them that one of the ninja will now face the form of his own most dreaded challenger. Lloyd is selected and finds himself facing an avatar of Harumi. Lloyd manages to defeat Harumi and wins the third and final Key-tana for the team. Lloyd, however, also loses his final life in the process.
| 141 | 13 | "Ninjago Confidential" | Wade Cross | Kevin Burke & Chris "Doc" Wyatt | August 23, 2020 | 0.27 |
Zane and P.I.X.A.L. visits an old childhood contact of Milton Dyer's who tells them that Dyer used to frequent an old video arcade hall called Buddy's Pizza. They head there to search for Dyer, but run into the Mechanic, who kidnaps Zane. P.I.X.A.L. ultimately finds Milton Dyer, who tells her that Unagami "is the game". He had not realized how dangerous it was, and tried to shut it down.
| 142 | 14 | "The Prodigal Father" | Daniel Ife | Kevin Burke & Chris "Doc" Wyatt | August 23, 2020 | 0.24 |
The Mechanic's henchmen capture Master Wu and bring him to the Mechanic's warehouse. The Mechanic uses him as leverage to coerce Zane into revealing the location of the motherboard which he requires to open the Manifestation Gate, through which Unagami is to enter the real world. Wu manages to activate a GPS location tracker, which reveals his location to P.I.X.A.L. However, she and Dyer arrive too late. Zane is hooked up to the Manifestation Gate as a type of processor, causing him to pass out as a result of the energy surge caused by the gate.
| 143 | 15 | "The Temple of Madness" | Shane Poettcker | Alisha Brophy & Scott Miles | August 30, 2020 | 0.24 |
Jay must stand alone against Unagami in the end-game, after Nya loses all her lives due to being stabbed through the back by an NPC named Sushimi, yet Unagami has a bigger battle in facing the truth about his own identity. Jay discovers that Unagami is actually the AI of the game and not Milton Dyer. Unagami uses the energy cube from Nya to complete the Manifestation Gate, and travels through it. Jay follows after him.
| 144 | 16 | "Game Over" | Wade Cross | Bragi Schut | August 30, 2020 | 0.23 |
Unagami breaks into the real world and terrorizes Ninjago City along with his army. Jay releases Zane from the gate. Zane, P.I.X.A.L., and Master Wu fight off Unagami's forces while Jay chases Unagami himself. Jay leads Unagami to the top of Borg Tower, where he is met by the others along with Milton Dyer himself. Dyer explains to Unagami why he shut him down and that chaos and destruction was not what he was made for. Eventually, Unagami understands. He takes the form of a small child and agrees to set everyone trapped inside Prime Empire free, including the other ninja, the trapped players, Scott, and the NPCs. Jay, Zane, P.I.X.A.L., and Wu reunite with the other ninja while Unagami and Milton Dyer live happily together.

== Accolades ==
In 2021, Prime Empire received three nominations in the Animation Series category of the Leo Awards for Best Art Direction, Sound, and Voice Performance. Kenny Ng was announced as winner for Best Art Direction for the episode Superstar Rockin' Jay.

== Other media ==
The season was preceded by the release of six short films titled Prime Empire Original Shorts, which were released on the Lego YouTube channel. The shorts introduced some of the main characters of the season including Unagami and the Mechanic.
