= Quittin' Time (disambiguation) =

"Quittin' Time" is a 1990 single by Mary Chapin Carpenter.

Quittin' Time may also refer to:

- "Quittin' Time", by Morgan Wallen from the album Dangerous: The Double Album, 2021
- "Quittin' Time!", an episode of Ninjago from Ninjago: Crystalized

== See also ==
- The Quittin Time Tour '24, a Zach Bryan concert tour
