= Ninjago: Seabound =

Danish-Canadian animated television season

- Season 14
- Seabound poster
- Starring: Sam Vincent; Vincent Tong; Michael Adamthwaite; Brent Miller; Kirby Morrow; Kelly Metzger; Paul Dobson; Jennifer Hayward; Jillian Michaels; Giles Panton; Cole Howard
- No. of episodes: 16

Release
- Original network: Netflix
- Original release: April 4 – April 30, 2021

Season chronology
- ← Previous; The Island Next → Crystalized

Seabound is the fourteenth season of the animated Ninjago television series (titled Ninjago: Masters of Spinjitzu before the eleventh season). The series was created by Michael Hegner and Tommy Andreasen. The season aired in April 2021, following The Island, which aired in March of the same year. It is followed by the fifteenth and final season, Crystalized.

The season focuses on the main ninja character Nya. It follows the storyline of her elemental powers being disrupted and how this is connected to an ancient mythical creature. The plot involves the ninja characters Jay, Zane, P.I.X.A.L., and Lloyd journeying deep beneath the sea to explore the mystery behind Nya's elemental powers. The season introduces two antagonists named Miss Demeanor and Prince Kalmaar, with the latter being the season's main antagonist. It is dedicated to Kirby Morrow, the voice actor for the character Cole, who died prior to the season's premiere.

== Voice cast ==
=== Main ===
- Sam Vincent as Lloyd Garmadon, the Green Ninja
- Vincent Tong as Kai, the red ninja and Elemental Master of Fire
- Michael Adamthwaite as Jay, the blue ninja and Elemental Master of Lightning
- Brent Miller as Zane, the white/titanium ninja and Elemental Master of Ice
- Kirby Morrow as Cole, the black ninja and Elemental Master of Earth
- Kelly Metzger as Nya, the Elemental Master of Water and Kai's sister
- Paul Dobson as Master Wu, the wise teacher of the ninja
- Jennifer Hayward as P.I.X.A.L., a female nindroid
- Jillian Michaels as Maya, Kai and Nya's mother
- Giles Panton as Kalmaar, the prince and later king of Merlopia
- Cole Howard as Benthomaar

=== Supporting ===
- Erin Mathews as Miss Demeanor
- Ron Halder as King Trimaar, the former king of Merlopia who is murdered by Kalmaar
- Kathleen Barr as Misako
- Vincent Tong as Ray
- Paul Dobson as Chief Mammatus/Cecil Putnam/
- Michael Adamthwaite as Smythe
- Brian Drummond as Shippleton/Hailmar/Gripe
- Kirby Morrow as Underhill
- Brynna Drummond as Antonia
- David Raynolds as Nelson
- Tabitha St Germain as Sammy
- Sabrina Pitre as Vania
- Michael Donovan as Police Commissioner
- Kelly Sheridan as Gayle Gossip
- Alan Marriott as Dareth
- Cathy Weseluck as Patty Keys
- Sam Vincent as Glutinous
- Jillian Michaels as Sphinx

== Casting ==
Seabound is the last season to feature Kirby Morrow as the voice actor for the main character Cole, which he had voiced for a decade since the beginning of the series. On 25 November 2020, The Lego Group confirmed in a statement on Twitter that the actor had completed his recordings for the season and that it would be dedicated to his memory. The statement also said, "We mourn the tragic loss of Ninjago actor Kirby Morrow who voiced Cole for more than ten years. His dedicated portrayal brought a unique sensibility to the character and gave hours of joy to the countless fans who have enjoyed Ninjago since 2011."

The voice actor for the main antagonist of the season, Kalmaar, was revealed to be Giles Panton by co-creator Tommy Andreasen on Twitter on 7 April 2021.

== Release ==
Anticipation for the season grew in early 2021, prior to its release. This was fuelled by several story hints dropped in the preceding months by co-creator Tommy Andreasen on Twitter, which included the comment that, "one ninja will change dramatically in stories to come". An official poster for the season was released in March 2021 on Lego Life, which depicted the six main ninja characters in mid-dive with Nya in the centre, emphasising her role as the focal character of the season. On May 16, 2021, lead writer Bragi Schut confirmed on Twitter that Seabound is the fourteenth season of the series but on June 10 of the same year, he clarified that he considers the fourteenth season to be both The Island and Seabound. However, co-creator Tommy Andreasen previously stated on May 18, 2021, that he considers The Island and Seabound to be two different installments.

== Plot ==
While trying to stop a criminal named Miss Demeanor from smuggling vengestone, Nya begins to lose control of her powers. Master Wu tells the ninja that the First Spinjitzu Master once controlled the elements but never wind and water because they belonged to Wojira, a storm sea and sky spirit and god. Wojira fell into a deep slumber after a warrior pried both of the amulets off the serpent's forehead. Ray and Maya arrive to help Nya control her powers. (Note: Ninjago, Season 14, Episode 1 "A Big Splash") While P.I.X.A.L. and Zane are out on a mission, they experience an energy pulse from deep in the ocean and conclude that it affected Nya's powers. The ninja decide to investigate on the Hydro Bounty, a submersible vessel. (Note: Ninjago, Season 14, Episode 2 "The Call of the Deep")

Nya, Jay, Lloyd, Zane, and P.I.X.A.L. journey to the depths of the ocean with Maya stowed away on board. Unfortunately, the Hydro Bounty crashes causing them to be stranded. (Note: Ninjago, Season 14, Episode 3 "Unsinkable") Maya and Nya decide to use mechs to reach the energy source and discover an underwater temple. They find Kalmaar, the son of King Trimaar, trying to awaken the serpent Wojira. (Note: Ninjago, Season 14, Episode 4 "Five Thousand Fathoms Down") He takes them prisoner and overhears Nya revealing the location of the Storm Amulet. Meanwhile, Jay decides to risk charging the battery in the Hydro Bounty using his elemental powers. (Note: Ninjago, Season 14, Episode 5 "The Wrath of Kalmaar") Nya and Maya are rescued by Jay and Lloyd but they are captured and taken to King Trimaar who accuses them of trespassing. Kalmaar performs a palace coup by striking his father with his weapon and declaring himself king of the Merlopians. His adopted brother Benthomaar learns the truth from Trimaar. (Note: Ninjago, Season 14, Episode 6 "Long Live the King") Benthomaar helps the ninja to escape Merlopia. They decide to travel to the island to obtain the Storm Amulet before Kalmaar can claim it. (Note: Ninjago, Season 14, Episode 7 "Escape from Merlopia") The tragic tale of Benthomaar is revealed, a tale filled with treachery and betrayal, but also a glimmer of hope. (Note: Ninjago, Season 14, Episode 8 "The Tale of Benthomaar")

On the Island of the Keepers, the ninja warn Chief Mammatus to prepare to defend the Storm Amulet. However, Zane realises it is a fake and that the real amulet was taken by Clutch Powers to the Explorers Club. (Note: Ninjago, Season 14, Episode 9 "The Storm Amulet") Wu, Cole, Misako, Kai and Ray arrive at the Explorers Club and are forced to battle Kalmaar. Meanwhile, Nya uses her powers to call whales to bring the stranded Hydro Bounty back to Ninjago City. (Note: Ninjago, Season 14, Episode 10 "Riddle of the Sphinx") As Kai is pursuing Kalmaar through the streets of Ninjago City, Antonia and Nelson obtain the amulet and are chased by Kalmaar, but he escapes with the amulet. (Note: Ninjago, Season 14, Episode 11 "Papergirl") Benthomaar tells the ninja the tale of Nyad, the first Elemental Master of Water, who defeated Wojira by becoming one with the ocean. When Kalmaar tries to leave the city, Nya steals the amulet and Cole takes it to Shintaro for protection without realising it is fake, allowing Kalmaar to reawaken Wojira. (Note: Ninjago, Season 14, Episode 12 "Master of the Sea")

Rising sea levels mark the invasion of Ninjago City by Kalmaar riding on Wojira, which forces the citizens to evacuate. (Note: Ninjago, Season 14, Episode 13 "The Calm Before the Storm") While the ninja are trying to save civilians, Nya challenges Kalmaar and Wojira. (Note: Ninjago, Season 14, Episode 14 "Assault on Ninjago City") Jay becomes trapped in his submersible vehicle and is saved by Benthomaar, but inhales water in his lungs. To save Jay and Ninjago City, Nya becomes one with the ocean, an act that can never be undone, causing the water to be removed from Jay's lungs. (Note: Ninjago, Season 14, Episode 15 "Nyad") A battle takes place between the ninja and Kalmaar in which Benthomaar breaks Kalmaar's trident causing him to lose control of Wojira. This results in Kalmaar being swallowed whole by Wojira. Nya transforms into a water dragon and defeats Wojira by destroying the Wave Amulet. Having merged with the endless sea, however, Nya can no longer remain on land and feels the ocean calling to her. After a tearful goodbye, she leaves the Ninja and returns to the ocean. Afterwards, the ninja hold a memorial ceremony to honor her and Nya is seen happily swimming with the whales in the final shot of the series. (Note: Ninjago, Season 14, Episode 16 "The Turn of the Tide")

== Episodes ==
No. overall	No. in season	Title	Directed by	Written by	Original release date
165	1	"A Big Splash"	Shane Poettcker	Bragi Schut	April 4, 2021 (Canada)
When Nya loses control of her elemental powers, the ninja search for answers, which may lie with the former master of water, Nya’s mother.
166	2	"The Call of the Deep"	Wade Cross	Bragi Schut	April 4, 2021 (Canada)
Nya's mother, Maya, arrives with help on how to regain control of Nya’s power. Zane and P.I.X.A.L. discover something else that may be behind the disturbances.
167	3	"Unsinkable"	Daniel Ife	Kevin Burke & Chris "Doc" Wyatt	April 11, 2021 (Canada)
The ninja embark on a mission to uncover the source of a mysterious power signal that is disrupting marine life, and Nya’s powers.
168	4	"Five Thousand Fathoms Down"	Shane Poettcker	Bragi Schut	April 11, 2021 (Canada)
They discover the source of the energy pulse that has been affecting Nya’s powers, and come face-to-face with a dangerous new villain, named Prince Kalmaar.
169	5	"The Wrath of Kalmaar"	Wade Cross	Bragi Schut	April 18, 2021 (Canada)
Nya and her mother Maya try to escape the evil Prince Kalmaar, who intends to seize the throne of his father, the benevolent King Trimaar.
170	6	"Long Live the King"	Daniel Ife	Kevin Burke & Chris "Doc" Wyatt	April 18, 2021 (Canada)
Prince Kalmaar deceives the Merlopians and turns the ninja into fugitives after falsely attacking his father King Trimaar.
171	7	"Escape from Merlopia"	Shane Poettcker	Bragi Schut	April 25, 2021 (Canada)
Aided by Benthomaar, Kalmaar's adopted brother, the ninja fight their way through the palace to the Hydro Bounty and must escape Kalmaar's forces.
172	8	"The Tale of Benthomaar"	Wade Cross	Kevin Burke & Chris "Doc" Wyatt	April 25, 2021 (Canada)
The tragic tale of Benthomaar is revealed… a tale filled with treachery, betrayal, but also a glimmer of hope.
173	9	"The Storm Amulet"	Daniel Ife	Bragi Schut	April 27, 2021 (UK)
Nya and the ninja race to obtain the Storm Amulet before Prince Kalmaar can obtain it and use it to awaken the doomsday serpent, Wojira.
174	10	"Riddle of the Sphinx"	Shane Poettcker	Kevin Burke & Chris "Doc" Wyatt	April 27, 2021 (UK)
In Ninjago City, Wu, Cole, Kai, Ray, and Misako must get into the Explorer’s Club and recover the Storm Amulet before King Kalmaar and his troops.
175	11	"Papergirl"	Wade Cross	Bragi Schut	April 28, 2021 (UK)
King Kalmaar attacks Ninjago City to obtain the Storm Amulet but runs into an unexpected obstacle in the form of a determined young papergirl.
176	12	"Master of the Sea"	Daniel Ife	Kevin Burke & Chris "Doc" Wyatt	April 28, 2021 (UK)
Nya learns the history of the Storm Amulet. Wu, Kai, Cole, Ray, and Misako try to prevent King Kalmaar from escaping the city with the Storm Amulet.
177	13	"The Calm Before the Storm"	Shane Poettcker	Bragi Schut	April 29, 2021 (UK)
Kalmaar awakens Wojira and sets his sights on the destruction of Ninjago City.
178	14	"Assault on Ninjago City"	Wade Cross	Kevin Burke & Chris "Doc" Wyatt	April 29, 2021 (UK)
The ninja do all they can to evacuate the city as Kalmaar's assault on the surface-world of Ninjago begins.
179	15	"Nyad"	Daniel Ife	Bragi Schut	April 30, 2021 (UK)
The ninja suffer a defeat at the hands of Wojira and Nya contemplates a decision that may save her friends and her city but could spell her own doom.
180	16	"The Turn of the Tide"	Wade Cross & Shane Poettcker	Bragi Schut	April 30, 2021 (UK)
Nya leads the ninja against King Kalmaar and Wojira in the final battle to save Ninjago City.

== Accolades ==
In 2022, Seabound received 4 nominations in the Animation Series category of the Leo Awards for Best Program (jointly with The Island), Best Direction for the "Turn of the Tide", Best Art Direction for "Nyad" and Best Sound for "Assault on Ninjago City".
