= Ninjago: Master of the Mountain =

Danish-Canadian animated television season

- Season 13
- Master of the Mountain poster
- Starring: Sam Vincent; Vincent Tong; Michael Adamthwaite; Brent Miller; Kirby Morrow; Kelly Metzger; Paul Dobson; Deven Mack; Sabrina Pitre
- No. of episodes: 16

Release
- Original network: Cartoon Network
- Original release: September 13 – October 25, 2020

Season chronology
- ← Previous; Prime Empire Next → The Island

Master of the Mountain is the thirteenth season of the animated Ninjago television series (titled Ninjago: Masters of Spinjitzu before the eleventh season). The series was created by Michael Hegner and Tommy Andreasen. The season aired from September 13 to October 25, 2020, following the twelfth season titled Prime Empire. It is succeeded by The Island.

The thirteenth season follows the ninja as they travel to the fictional kingdom of Shintaro. The focus of the season is the ninja character Cole as he discovers the dungeons that lie beneath Shintaro Mountain. The season introduces two tribes named the Geckles and the Munce who dwell in the mountain and the season's main antagonist named the Skull Sorcerer. The season finale ends with Cole unlocking a new ability that is described as the "Spinjitzu Burst" and defeating the Skull Sorcerer, revealed to be Shintaro's ruler, King Vangelis.

== Voice cast ==
=== Main ===
- Sam Vincent as Lloyd Garmadon, the Green Ninja
- Vincent Tong as Kai, the red ninja, the Elemental Master of Fire, and Nya's brother
- Michael Adamthwaite as Jay, the blue ninja and Elemental Master of Lightning
- Brent Miller as Zane, the white/titanium ninja and Elemental Master of Ice
- Kirby Morrow as Cole, the black ninja and Elemental Master of Earth
- Kelly Metzger as Nya, the Elemental Master of Water and Kai's sister
- Paul Dobson as Sensei Wu, the wise teacher of the ninja
- Deven Mack as King Vangelis/the Skull Sorcerer/Korgran's Axe
- Sabrina Pitre as Princess Vania

=== Supporting ===
- Michael Adamthwaite as the Skull of Hazza D'Ur/Murt
- Brian Drummond as Hailmar/Gleck/Mino
- Tabitha St Germain as Queen Murtessa
- Andrew McNee as Chancellor Gulch
- Ian James Corlett as Fungus
- Paul Dobson as Korgran
- Adam Trask as Plundar
- Kathleen Barr as Misako
- Jennifer Hayward as P.I.X.A.L., a female nindroid
- Bill Newton as Gliff
- Peter New as Groko
- Sabrina Pitre as Garpo
- Tabitha St Germain as Ginkle
- Mark Oliver as Korgran's father
- Erin Mathews as Lilly

== Release ==
The season was first revealed in a 30-second teaser trailer, which was released on the Lego YouTube channel on June 17, 2020. This was followed by an official trailer on June 22, 2020. Master of the Mountain premiered on Cartoon Network on September 13, 2020 with the release of the first episode titled Shintaro. The subsequent episodes were released throughout September and October 2020.

== Plot ==
The Ninja and Master Wu are invited to the Kingdom of Shintaro. (Note: Ninjago, Season 13, Episode 1 "Shintaro") They meet King Vangelis and his daughter Vania, who takes an interest in Cole. That night, a Geckle enters Cole's room, who discovers that the creature has his mother's necklace. Vania takes Cole to a secret entrance that leads into the Dungeons of Shintaro. They discover the Geckles and the Munce, two tribes forced to work in the mines by the evil Skull Sorcerer, but Cole is taken prisoner. (Note: Ninjago, Season 13, Episode 2 "Into the Dark")

Vania leads the ninja to the dungeons, but they are captured by the Awakened Warriors, who can be revived by the sorcerer's Skull of Hazza D'ur. (Note: Ninjago, Season 13, Episode 3 "The Worst Rescue Ever") One of the Geckles tells Cole about the Blades of Deliverance, which were wielded by a warrior named "Gilly" who freed the tribes from a dragon called Grief-Bringer. The theft of the blades caused a rift between the two tribes. The ninja escape and free the tribes. They split up, with Kai and Zane taking a tunnel with the Geckles, and Lloyd, Jay and Nya taking another tunnel with the Munce. Cole is forced to take a different tunnel by the Skull Sorcerer. (Note: Ninjago, Season 13, Episode 4 "The Two Blades")

Nya, Jay, and Lloyd meet the Queen of the Munce, Murtessa, who takes a liking to Jay. Murtessa challenges Nya to a duel, who wins and becomes Queen of the Munce. (Note: Ninjago, Season 13, Episode 5 "Queen of the Munce") Meanwhile, Kai and Zane are accused by Geckle Chancellor Gulch of working for the Skull Sorcerer and are forced to undergo a "Trial by Mino". After winning the trial, Kai and Zane notice Gleck is wearing Cole's necklace. They realise that "Gilly" was Cole's late mother Lilly. Gulch resigns as Chancellor and gives the position to Kai. (Note: Ninjago, Season 13, Episode 6 "Trial By Mino")

Vania decides to go after Cole and saves him from giant spiders. They return to the surface and inform Wu about the ninjas' predicament. They consult King Vangelis, but he reveals that he is the Skull Sorcerer. Vangelis presses a button that opens a trap door and Cole, Wu and Vania fall into the abyss. (Note: Ninjago, Season 13, Episode 7 "The Skull Sorcerer") After a safe landing at Rock-Bottom, Wu, Cole, and Vania are met by Fungus, Korgran and Plundar who call themselves "The Lowly". (Note: Ninjago, Season 13, Episode 8 "The Real Fall") They reveal that they were sent to retrieve the skull but Vangelis banished them to Rock-Bottom. Cole decides to change the team name to "The Upply". (Note: Ninjago, Season 13, Episode 9 "Dungeon Party!") The Upply, Cole, Wu and Vania discover the Heart of the Mountain, a legendary temple of the Masters of Earth. Wu explains to Cole the teaching of the Spinjitzu Burst, who then finds and operates a mech to return the group to the surface. (Note: Ninjago, Season 13, Episode 10 "Dungeon Crawl!")

Nya and Kai lead the tribes to a peace meeting, but are ambushed by the undead dragon, Grief-Bringer, who forces the tribes to flee into a Strong-Cave. (Note: Ninjago, Season 13, Episode 11 "Grief-Bringer!") Pursued by a magma monster, Cole, Princess Vania, Wu & the Lowly arrive at a mysterious temple deep in Shintaro Mountain, a temple which was once a training ground for Earth Elementals including Cole's own mother, Lilly. (Note: Ninjago, Season 13, Episode 12 "Masters Never Quit") The Skull Sorcerer tricks Lloyd into believing that the Munce and Geckles can go free, but he enslaves them and the ninja are captured. (Note: Ninjago, Season 13, Episode 13 "The Darkest Hour") Cole, the Lowly, Princess Vania and Wu discover that the stone-mech is fueled by Elemental Power, and attach it to the mine-carts in an effort to blast their way out of the mountain to confront the evil Skull Sorcerer. (Note: Ninjago, Season 13, Episode 14 "The Ascent") Cole and the Upply arrive at the Skull Sorcerer's Keep and find the ninja locked into cages. The Geckles and Munce have been put back to work in the chain-gang, mining Vengestone. (Note: Ninjago, Season 13, Episode 15 "The Upply Strike Back!") Cole and his crew venture underground to fight the Skull Sorcerer. Cole confronts him with the Blades of Deliverance, but discovers that they are powerless. He has a flashback of his mother Lilly, which unlocks the Spinjitzu Burst and destroys the Skull, awakened warriors and Grief-Bringer. Vania arrives with Wu and the Winged Guards of Shintaro, who arrest Vangelis and crown Vania as Queen of Shintaro. (Note: Ninjago, Season 13, Episode 16 "The Son of Lilly")

== Episodes ==
No. overall	No. in season	Title	Directed by	Written by	Original release date	U.S. viewers (millions)
145	1	"Shintaro"	Daniel Ife	Kevin Burke & Chris "Doc" Wyatt	September 13, 2020	0.18
The ninja are invited to the birthday of Princess Vania of the fabled Kingdom of Shintaro and set sail for Shintaro but are attacked by a pack of Dire Bats, vicious aerial predators who roam the mountains around Shintaro. They are rescued by a regiment of the Winged Guards of Shintaro, led by the brave Hailmar.
146	2	"Into the Dark"	Shane Poettcker	Kevin Burke & Chris "Doc" Wyatt	September 13, 2020	0.16
The ninja are welcomed to Shintaro by King Vangelis and Princess Vania. Cole is accosted by a Geckle named Gleck who is wearing a necklace that belonged to his mother. Princess Vania leads Cole to a mountain tunnel and they stumble upon an underground mining operation where Geckles and Munce are being forced to dig by an army of Skeleton Warriors, controlled by the vicious Skull Sorcerer.
147	3	"The Worst Rescue Ever"	Wade Cross	Chato Hill	September 20, 2020	0.20
Cole is a prisoner of the Skull Sorcerer while Princess Vania races back to the surface where she tells the ninja and her father what she saw below. The ninja quickly gather their things and race to Cole's rescue. Deep underground, Cole toils in darkness alongside the Geckles and Munce, whom he discovers are bitter rivals over a past grievance that each side blames upon the other.
148	4	"The Two Blades"	Daniel Ife	Bragi Schut	September 20, 2020	0.22
The ninja learn that the Geckles' and Munce's mutual hatred stems from the fact that each group thinks the other stole a pair of swords called the Blades of Deliverance, which were given to them by a hero who came to their mountain many years earlier. The hero, whom the Geckles call "Gilly," saved them from a dragon named Grief-Bringer and gave them the swords as a farewell gift.
149	5	"Queen of the Munce"	Shane Poettcker	Bragi Schut	September 27, 2020	0.15
Having become separated from the others, Nya, Jay, and Lloyd are led back to the Munce "Home-Cave" by a Munce named Murt. There, they are introduced to the Munce Queen, Murtessa, who immediately falls for Jay, whom she considers a powerful warrior. Realizing that Nya and Jay are engaged, the queen turns on Nya and challenges her to combat to determine which of them shall wed Jay.
150	6	"Trial By Mino"	Wade Cross	Kevin Burke & Chris "Doc" Wyatt	September 27, 2020	0.18
Kai and Zane stumble into a party of Geckles who think they may be working for the Skull Sorcerer. They are arrested and brought back to the Geckle "Strong-Cave," where they meet the Geckle leader, Chancellor Gulch. Gulch decides to put the matter to a "Trial-By-Mino." Kai and Zane are cast into a pit with a raging Mino to determine their innocence or guilt.
151	7	"The Skull Sorcerer"	Daniel Ife	Kevin Burke & Chris "Doc" Wyatt	October 4, 2020	0.15
Cole runs first into a nest of Dire-Bats, and then into a cave tunnel filled with giant spiders, but Princess Vania and her pet dragon, Chompy, arrive just in time to free Cole and they escape back to the surface where they tell King Vangelis about the evil Skull Sorcerer. In a shocking twist, however, Vangelis reveals that he IS the Skull Sorcerer. After the Skull Sorcerer sends Cole and Master Wu to the bowels of the mountain, Vania follows them but not before Vangelis disowns her as his daughter.
152	8	"The Real Fall"	Shane Poettcker	Bragi Schut	October 4, 2020	0.15
Princess Vania attempts to catch the falling Master Wu and Cole, but their combined weight tears her wings loose. All 3 friends find themselves plunging into the mountain. As they fall, they encounter various bizarre threats and creatures before they are swept over a waterfall and tumble through a sinkhole to wash up on the shores of a cavern called Rock-Bottom, where he meets a group of adventurers down here.
153	9	"Dungeon Party!"	Wade Cross	Kevin Burke & Chris "Doc" Wyatt	October 11, 2020	0.15
Cole awakens from a dream to find himself surrounded by the Lowly, Master Wu, and Princess Vania. The Lowly reveal they were adventurers who, at the request of King Vangelis, went searching for the Skull of Hazza D'ur. They found the skull and delivered it to the King, who - instead of destroying it, as he had promised - betrayed them and cast them into the mountain, taking the skull for himself.: Note: This episode partly uses 2D animated style.
154	10	"Dungeon Crawl!"	Daniel Ife	Kevin Burke & Chris "Doc" Wyatt	October 11, 2020	0.17
Cole leads the Lowly, Princess Vania, and Wu in a series of fruitless efforts to find a way out of Rock-Bottom. Wu tells Cole about a legendary Temple of Earth Elementals known as the Heart of the Mountain. Surmising that the Temple is actually real, Wu guesses that it might be hidden in Shintaro Mountain and urges Cole to try and tap into his elemental powers to find a way out.
155	11	"Grief-Bringer"	Shane Poettcker	Bragi Schut	October 18, 2020	0.16
Nya uses her elemental powers to coerce the Munce into agreeing to a truce meeting with the Geckles. At the same time, in the Geckle camp, Kai and Zane are forced to resort to trickery in order to manipulate the Geckles to attend the truce meeting. The Skull Sorcerer learns of the meeting and uses the skull of Hazza D'Ur to resurrect the fearsome dragon Grief-Bringer!
156	12	"Masters Never Quit"	Wade Cross	Bragi Schut	October 18, 2020	0.12
Cole, Princess Vania, Master Wu, and the Lowly arrive at an ancient abandoned temple. Wu realizes it is The Heart Of the Mountain. The group discover an old abandoned Stone Mech and a mural of Cole's mother, Lilly. In the mural, she is depicted fighting the dragon, Grief-Bringer, using the Spinjitzu Burst. Wu tells Cole about the Burst - a powerful form of Spinjitzu which his mother studied.
157	13	"The Darkest Hour"	Daniel Ife	Kevin Burke & Chris "Doc" Wyatt	October 25, 2020	0.17
The Skull Sorcerer hunts down the ninja who flee to the Geckle "Strong-Cave". The Skull Sorcerer promises to let the Munce and Geckles live if they turn over the ninja. Nya stumbles on a possible way out of the cave and the Munce and Geckles work together to clear a rubble-strewn tunnel. The Munce and Geckles begin to work past their differences. But then Grief-Bringer forces his way into the cave. Left with no other choice, the ninja surrender themselves up but not before the Skull Sorcerer imprisonments all of the Geckles and the Munce.
158	14	"The Ascent"	Shane Poettcker	Bragi Schut	October 25, 2020	0.17
Cole discovers that the stone-mech is powered by Elemental Earth energy and uses his powers to activate the mech. He straps the mech to the mine-carts and uses it, like a crude rocket, to blast the mine-carts back up the track to the top of the mountain. Along the way, however, the Magma Monster arrives and a desperate battle between Cole and the creature ensues. During the aftermath, Hailmar and the Winged Guards of Shintaro arrive and are preparing to arrest Cole and Master Wu on King Vangelis’s orders but not before Vania challenges Hailmar so he’ll listen to her.
159	15	"The Upply Strike Back!"	Wade Cross	Bragi Schut	October 25, 2020	0.20
Cole and the Upply arrive at the Skull Sorcerer's Keep and find the ninja locked into cages. The Geckles and Munce have been put back to work in the chain-gang, mining Vengestone. While Jay is formulating a plan, he sees the Skull Sorcerer draw the two fabled Blades of Deliverance. Hoping to retrieve the blades, Cole sneaks into the Skull Keep while Wu and the Upply set about freeing the ninja.
160	16	"The Son of Lilly"	Daniel Ife	Bragi Schut	October 25, 2020	0.20
As Cole and the Skull Sorcerer face off, the Geckles and Munce storm the Keep. Plundar frees the ninja from their cages and the ninja join the battle. Vania arrives leading the winged Shintaro Guards. The Skull Sorcerer destroys the supposedly "fabled" magical Blades, revealed to be nothing more than ordinary swords. Grief-Bringer awakens and joins the fight, and all looks lost. But at the last minute, Cole manages to uses the Spinjitzu Burst and defeats the Skull Sorcerer. After his defeat Vania has now proclaimed herself the Queen of Shintaro while the ninja leave the Ivory City, seeking a new adventure on their path. Wu states that he would rather continue and go wherever the wind takes them.

== Accolades ==
In 2021, Master of the Mountain was nominated for the Leo Awards for Best Direction of an Animated Series for the episode Son of Lilly.
