= Ninjago: Secrets of the Forbidden Spinjitzu =

Danish-Canadian animated television season

- Season 11
- Secrets of the Forbidden Spinjitzu poster
- Starring: Sam Vincent; Vincent Tong; Michael Adamthwaite; Brent Miller; Kirby Morrow; Kelly Metzger; Paul Dobson; Jennifer Hayward; Pauline Newstone; Tabitha St. Germain
- No. of episodes: 30

Release
- Original network: Cartoon Network
- Original release: June 22, 2019 – February 1, 2020

Season chronology
- ← Previous; March of the Oni Next → Prime Empire

Secrets of the Forbidden Spinjitzu is the eleventh season of the animated Ninjago television series (titled Ninjago: Masters of Spinjitzu before the eleventh season). The series was created by Michael Hegner and Tommy Andreasen. The season aired from June 22, 2019 to February 1, 2020, following the tenth season titled March of the Oni. It is succeeded by the twelfth season titled Prime Empire.

The eleventh season marked a significant change in the format of the show. From the eleventh season onwards, the series was animated by WildBrain Studios in Canada and the "Masters of Spinjitzu" subtitle was dropped. The runtime for each episode also changed from 22 minutes to 11 minutes. The eleventh season also marked the use of new 2D anime-style segments that were included to add new creativity to the show.

Secrets of the Forbidden Spinjitzu is split into two parts titled The Fire Chapter and The Ice Chapter, with each chapter consisting of 15 episodes. Each half follows a separate plot, which combine to form an entire story arc. The Fire Chapter focuses on the threat of a new antagonist named Aspheera and her army of Pyro Vipers. The season introduces a new power called "Forbidden Spinjitzu" which is wielded by both Aspheera and the main ninja characters. Secrets of the Forbidden Spinjitzu also introduces the character Clutch Powers into the Ninjago universe, which was a pre-existing Lego character from the 2010 animated film Lego: The Adventures of Clutch Powers. The first half of the season ends in a cliffhanger, in which the character Zane is lost in another realm and the ninja characters decide to travel across the realms to find him. The Ice Chapter continues the storyline from the first half of the season. It introduces one of the 16 fictional realms in the Ninjago universe, the Never-Realm, and follows the storyline of the ninja and their search for Zane.

== Voice cast ==
=== Main ===
- Sam Vincent as Lloyd Garmadon, the Green Ninja he is Elemental Master of Energy.
- Vincent Tong as Kai, the red ninja, Elemental Master of Fire and Nya's Brother.
- Michael Adamthwaite as Jay, the blue ninja, Elemental Master of Lightning, and Nya's Yang/Boyfriend.
- Brent Miller as Zane, the white/titanium ninja and Elemental Master of Ice
- Kirby Morrow as Cole, the black ninja and Elemental Master of Earth
- Kelly Metzger as Nya, the Elemental Master of Water, Kai's sister, and Jay's Yin/Girlfriend.
- Paul Dobson as Sensei Wu, the wise teacher of the ninja
- Jennifer Hayward as P.I.X.A.L., a female nindroid
- Pauline Newstone as Aspheera
- Tabitha St. Germain as Akita

=== Supporting ===
- Brian Drummond as Char/Shippleton/Grimfax/Krag
- Michael Kopsa as Vex
- Michael Donovan as Police Commissioner
- Kelly Sheridan as Gayle Gossip
- Paul Dobson as Warden Noble/Cecil Putnam/Acidicus
- Ian James Corlett as Clutch Powers
- Gary Chalk as Killow/Director
- Michael Adamthwaite as Smythe
- Sam Vincent as Dwayne
- Brynna Drummond as Antonia
- David Raynolds as Nelson
- Ian Hanlin as Dan Vaapit
- Alan Marriott as Dareth
- Bill Newton as Fred Finely
- Ian James Corlett as Scales
- Jim Conrad as the First Spinjitzu Master
- Madyx Whiteway as Young Wu
- Dean Petriw as Young Garmadon
- Michael Antonakos as the Mechanic
- Adrian Petriw as Fugi-Dove
- Sharon Alexander as Ultra Violet
- Cole Howard as Kataru
- Michael Dobson as King Mambo
- Ashleigh Ball as Young Aspheera
- Patty Drake as Sorla

== Production ==
=== Animation ===
From the eleventh season, the animation for the series was produced in Canada at WildBrain Studios, whereas it had previously been animated by Wil Film ApS in Denmark.

Secrets of the Forbidden Spinjitzu was the first season in the Ninjago series to mix animation styles between a 2D and 3D animation format. The season incorporates non-minifigure 2D animated anime-style segments in the show. These changes were announced at the 2019 San Diego Comic-Con by Jason Cosler and Robert May of The Lego Group. Executive Producer Tommy Andreasen confirmed the changes on Twitter, stating, "to clarify, the Ninjago series will still be 3d mini-fig based…but once in a while, if the story motivates it, we will be doing episodes in different styles. Ninjago is playground for creativity and fun."

=== Format ===
The eleventh season marked significant changes in the format of the show. The Masters of Spinjitzu subtitle was dropped, so that the series would be simply titled Ninjago. The new format also included a change in the long-standing episode runtime from 22 minutes to 11 minutes. The reduction to 11 minutes resulted in a brisker pace to the storyline. Bragi Schut continued as the writer for the series, having replaced the original writers Dan and Kevin Hageman in the tenth season. With the announcement of this change, The Lego Group stated, "The upcoming TV season will have 30 episodes of 11 minutes each, making it the ninjas' biggest adventure yet. The season picks up shortly after 'March of the Oni' and remains true to the story canon and the characters. This is not a reboot, nor a spin-off, but merely a brand-new adventure. A fresh beginning helps new viewers to watch and discover the magic of Ninjago without knowing much about the 100 episodes prior." The announcement further explained, "Whereas the first chapter was heavily tied to a 22 min serialized TV format, this next chapter will not be confined to a specific format. The 11 min episodes allow for new and creative possibilities for the storytelling. Also, with the growth of exciting story formats like comics, in-world books etc. that are extending the Ninjago universe, this new chapter will be more exploratory and creative." The change in the episode runtime was a particular cause of concern with fans of the show. Co-creator Tommy Andreasen explained that the 11 minute format, "was a way for the broadcasters to make it easier to programme". He also commented, "Once you're working with 11 minutes it's not just the same idea stretched over two 11s. Now it's a new idea in every episode, and it really makes you risky and fresh - and able to tell stories very efficiently...If there's something I would like Ninjago TV show to be, it's this creative playground, where you should never know exactly what you can expect".

== Release ==
The first 1-minute teaser trailer for the season was released on May 26, 2019 on the Lego YouTube channel. A trailer for The Ice Chapter was later released on September 6, 2019 on the Lego YouTube channel to promote the second half of the season. The season premiered on Cartoon Network on June 22, 2019 with the release of the first episode titled Wasted True Potential. The Fire Chapter episodes were released throughout June, July and August 2019 and ended on August 10, 2019 with the release of A Cold Goodbye. The Ice Chapter was released on December 14, 2019 with the release of the episode titled The Never-Realm. The Ice Chapter continued throughout December 2019 and January 2020 until the season finale titled Awakenings was released on February 1 of the same year.

== Plot ==
=== The Fire Chapter ===
After defeating the Oni, the ninja have become lazy and out of shape. They decide to search for a new threat to face, but Ninjago is at peace. (Note: Ninjago, Season 11, Episode 1 "Wasted True Potential") They find their next quest when Clutch Powers discovers an ancient pyramid. (Note: Ninjago, Season 11, Episode 2 "Questing for Quests") The tomb is a prison for a snake queen named Aspheera, who is unwittingly released by the ninja. She steals Kai's powers and uses them to revive her army of Pyro Vipers, with the aim of conquering Ninjago and exacting revenge on the "Treacherous Deceiver". (Note: Ninjago, Season 11, Episode 5 "Booby Traps and How to Survive Them") The ninja are trapped in the pyramid, but rescued by P.I.X.A.L. (Note: Ninjago, Season 11, Episode 7 "Ninja vs Lava") They learn about the Scrolls of Forbidden Spinjitzu, which grant the user great powers, but can also corrupt them. (Note: Ninjago, Season 11, Episode 9 "Powerless") Wu eventually admits that he is the "Treacherous Deceiver", and explains that he befriended Aspheera and taught her Spinjitzu, but she used it for evil by taking over the Serpentine. (Note: Ninjago, Season 11, Episode 10 "Ancient History") As a result, Wu and Garmadon were forced to defeat Aspheera using Forbidden Spinjitzu and imprisoned her inside the pyramid. (Note: Ninjago, Season 11, Episode 11 "Never Trust a Human") After Aspheera steals one of the scrolls from the museum, the ninja go after the other at the Explorers Club, while Aspheera attacks the Monastery of Spinjitzu. (Note: Ninjago, Season 11, Episode 13 "The Explorers Club") The ninja defeat Aspheera, but Zane is hit with the scroll's power and is transported to the Never-Realm. (Note: Ninjago, Season 11, Episode 14 "Vengeance is Mine!") Wu volunteers to rescue Zane, but the ninja overpower him and go instead, before Wu can warn them that there is no way to return. (Note: Ninjago, Season 11, Episode 15 "A Cold Goodbye")

=== The Ice Chapter ===
The ninja reach the Never-Realm and arrive at a village, where they meet the elder, Sorla and help the locals fend off the Blizzard Samurai, led by the Ice Emperor and his advisor, Vex. (Note: Ninjago, Season 11, Episode 16 "The Never-Realm") The ninja believe that Zane was captured by the Ice Emperor and decide to stay at the village, where Kai attempts to regain his powers. (Note: Ninjago, Season 11, Episode 17 "Fire Maker") Cole leaves to find the Traveller's Tree to collect some leaves for the Traveller's Tea so that they can return home. He befriends Krag, the last surviving yeti, and Lloyd leaves to find Zane's mech. (Note: Ninjago, Season 11, Episode 18 "An Unlikely Ally") Along the way, Lloyd befriends a Formling named Akita, who can transform into a wolf and wishes to exact revenge on the Ice Emperor for freezing her people. (Note: Ninjago, Season 11, Episode 23 "Secret of the Wolf") Meanwhile, the village is attacked by the Ice Emperor's dragon Boreal, forcing the remaining ninja to flee and continue their journey. Lloyd and Akita are later attacked by Boreal, who kidnaps Lloyd and carries him to the Ice Emperor, who is revealed to be Zane. (Note: Ninjago, Season 11, Episode 25 My Enemy, My Friend") After being transported to the Never-Realm decades into the past, he lost his memory and was manipulated by Vex, a Formling who wished to exact revenge on his people. Zane was led to believe he was the Ice Emperor and the two then dethroned the ruler of the realm, Grimfax. Zane used the Scroll of Forbidden Spinjitzu to corrupt Grimfax's warriors, turning them into the Blizzard Samurai. (Note: Ninjago, Season 11, Episode 27 "Corruption") Lloyd is locked in a cell and meets Akita's brother, Kataru. They form an alliance with Grimfax to dethrone Zane and liberate the Never-Realm. (Note: Ninjago, Season 11, Episode 28 "A Fragile Hope") Kai recovers his powers, destroying Boreal, and Zane recovers his memories after Vex attempts to kill Lloyd. Zane destroys his sceptre, which restores peace to the Never-Realm. Grimfax regains his throne, Vex is banished for his crimes, and the ninja return to Ninjago. (Note: Ninjago, Season 11, Episode 30 "Awakenings")

== Episodes ==
No. overall	No. in season	Title	Directed by	Written by	Original release date	U.S. viewers (millions)
The Fire Chapter
99	1	"Wasted True Potential"	Wade Cross	Bragi Schut	June 22, 2019	0.31
Having grown complacent in the wake of their victory over the Oni, the ninja are enjoying life, playing video-games, sleeping in, and soaking in a hot tub (fashioned from one of the monastery's enormous bells). Unfortunately, this behavior quickly grows tiresome and the ninja are confronted by Master Wu, who accuses them of not taking their duties seriously. The ninja deny this, and Wu decides to put them to the test with a series of booby-traps and pranks intended to test their reflexes and skills. Among the more dangerous challenges, the ninja must catch a dangerous breed of chicken that grows wild in the hills surrounding the monastery. Put to shame by the chicken, the ninja ultimately realize: Wu is right. They have gone soft. They decide to take on a new quest to get back in ninja-shape.
100	2	"Questing for Quests"	Daniel Ife	Bragi Schut	June 22, 2019	0.30
Realizing they have gone soft, the Ninja search for a quest to reignite their Spinjitzu training and try to cooperate with the police in fighting crime; unfortunately, Ninjago City is enjoying a period of rare tranquility. Having given up hope, the Ninja learn of Clutch Powers' recent discovery and decide to go exploring with him.
101	3	"A Rocky Start"	Shane Poettcker	Bragi Schut	June 29, 2019	0.32
The Ninja set off for their quest in the Desert of Doom, but on the way are attacked by an ancient giant scarab beetle. Eventually, they manage to escape it, but are stranded in the middle of the desert.
102	4	"The Belly of the Beast"	Wade Cross	Bragi Schut	June 29, 2019	0.31
To repair the Land-Bounty, the Ninja must retrieve a critical engine component that has been swallowed by the giant beetle. Zane decides to get swallowed himself, and once he has found the component, the Ninja pull him back up with a rope. Then, they fix the Land-Bounty and escape the beetle.
103	5	"Boobytraps and How to Survive Them"	Daniel Ife	Bragi Schut	July 6, 2019	0.22
The Ninja persuade Clutch Powers to enter the Ancient Pyramid with them and they survive many booby traps along the way. However, they accidentally release Aspheera from her tomb, and she brings the Pyro Vipers to life and entombs the Ninja. She then leads her forces towards Ninjago City, looking for a "treacherous deceiver". This episode is a crossover with "Lego: The Adventures of Clutch Powers"
104	6	"The News Never Sleeps!"	Shane Poettcker	Bragi Schut	July 6, 2019	0.19
Nelson teams up with Antonia on his first day as a paperboy. While trying to deliver the papers around a rampaged by the Pyro Vipers Ninjago City, they get a message that the Ninja is in trouble. Nelson persuades Antonia to help him warn Master Wu.: Note: This is the first episode of the show to not feature any of the Ninja in any way.
105	7	"Ninja vs Lava"	Wade Cross	Kevin Burke & Chris "Doc" Wyatt	July 13, 2019	0.41
The Ninja are trapped in the pyramid and try to escape, but encounter encroaching lava and traps along the way. They soon understand that their lack of coordination as a team may prove deadly and work together to escape the pyramid. However, when things get very difficult, the Ninja are saved by P.I.X.A.L., who tells them of the Pyro Vipers' attack in Ninjago City.
106	8	"Snaketastrophy"	Daniel Ife	Kevin Burke & Chris "Doc" Wyatt	July 13, 2019	0.35
While the Pyro Vipers attack Ninjago City, reporters newscast the event which has become known as Snaketastrophy. Meanwhile, Aspheera learns of the Scroll of Forbidden Spinjitzu and sets off for the Ninjago Museum of History, while the Ninja reach the city and battle the Pyro Vipers.
107	9	"Powerless"	Shane Poettcker	Kevin Burke & Chris "Doc" Wyatt	July 20, 2019	0.24
The Ninja rush to the museum to recover the scroll before it falls into the hands of Aspheera, but they arrive at the same time and battle for the scroll. Its power surpasses Lloyd, but Aspheera acquires the scroll and traps the Ninja. A fan named Jake prompts Kai, now powerless, to never give up and save his friends.
108	10	"Ancient History"	Wade Cross	Bragi Schut	July 20, 2019	0.27
While Aspheera pursues revenge on the "Treacherous Deceiver" who betrayed her, the Ninja go underground seeking the Serpentine. There, they make a discovery leading them to believe Lord Garmadon is the "Treacherous Deceiver", but Wu corrects them revealing himself to be the one.
109	11	"Never Trust a Human"	Daniel Ife	Bragi Schut	July 27, 2019	0.24
Wu and Lord Garmadon decide to visit the forbidden Serpentine Valley, breaking a peace, and are captured by the Serpentine, but are released by Aspheera with the promise of teaching her the secrets of Spinjitzu. Wu keeps his promise and teaches her, but she uses the power to take over her Tribe. The two brothers use the Scrolls of Forbidden Spinjitzu to overthrow Aspheera, who is entombed for her actions.
110	12	"Under Siege"	Shane Poettcker	Kevin Burke & Chris "Doc" Wyatt	July 27, 2019	0.23
Having learned Master Wu is the "Treacherous Deceiver", the Ninja find themselves under siege at the Monastery, trying to protect Wu from Aspheera. The Pyro Vipers manage to enter the Monastery, but the Ninja, P.I.X.A.L., and Wu have hidden in the underground base.
111	13	"The Explorers Club"	Wade Cross	Kevin Burke & Chris "Doc" Wyatt	August 3, 2019	0.32
The other Ninja learn of the second Scroll of Forbidden Spinjitzu's location from Clutch Powers and break into the Explorer's Club to obtain it, running afoul of the club's manager and irritate club members. In the end, they obtain the scroll but wreak havoc in the club.
112	14	"Vengeance is Mine!"	Daniel Ife	Bragi Schut	August 3, 2019	0.27
Aspheera breaks into the underground base and confronts Wu, but the Ninja arrive with the second scroll and battle her. Zane eventually defeats her, but she manages to strike him with her scroll. Although the Ninja believe Zane's dead, Wu discovers from Aspheera, who has been imprisoned, that Zane is banished to a distant and remote realm called the Never-Realm.
113	15	"A Cold Goodbye"	Shane Poettcker	Bragi Schut	August 10, 2019	0.29
Having learned Zane is not dead from Aspheera, but has been banished to the Never Realm, Master Wu prepares to go after him, but the Ninja want to come along as well. When he denies, they take matters into their own hands and defy him. However, Wu uses the Scroll of Forbidden Spinjitzu to stop the Ninja from leaving. However, the Ninja defeat him and go themselves to the Never-Realm, before Wu warns them that there is no way back - the reason it is called the Never Realm.
The Ice Chapter
114	16	"The Never-Realm"	Wade Cross	Bragi Schut	December 14, 2019	0.37
The Ninja arrive in the Never-Realm and try to find shelter while wolves attack them, but villagers save them and take them to their village. One of them tells the Ninja about the Ice Emperor and that Zane is in the Emperor's palace. Meanwhile, Vex, the advisor, tells the Emperor that strangers have arrived and prepares to attack the ninja.
115	17	"Fire Maker"	Daniel Ife	Bragi Schut	December 14, 2019	0.37
The ninja and the villagers prepare to fight the Blizzard Samurai. While fighting Lloyd and Cole realize that some of them are made of Ice and some were corrupted people. Grimfax extinguishes the Hearth Fire. However, after they defeat the Blizzard Samurai, Kai tries to make fire, using his elemental powers by believing in himself and succeeds in restoring the Hearth Fire, gaining the title "Fire maker".
116	18	"An Unlikely Ally"	Shane Poettcker	Bragi Schut	December 21, 2019	0.34
The Ninja help the villagers to build weapons in case the Blizzard Samurai return again. Lloyd begins his journey to the Ice castle with the Titan mech tracker that Nya gives him to find it. In his road, he is attacked by wolves, but one of them forces them to retreat. Later, Lloyd gets ambushed by the Blizzard Samurai, but he successfully evades them. He arrives at the Land Bounty, finding it damaged by the freeze.The wolf that forced the others away strangely follows and stays with him. The tracker locates the mech, giving Lloyd hope to find Zane.
117	19	"The Absolute Worst"	Wade Cross	Kevin Burke & Chris "Doc" Wyatt	December 21, 2019	0.34
When Ultra Violet learns that the Ninja have gone missing, she and The Mechanic plan to escape. In the escape route, they begin to discuss about who is the worst ninja. They are soon interrupted by Fugi-Dove, an infamous criminal. They continue talking along the route. Once they have escaped, P.I.X.A.L catches them and they are thrown back into their cells.: Note: This episode partly uses 2D animated style.
118	20	"The Message"	Daniel Ife	Bragi Schut	December 28, 2019	0.46
Back in the Never-Realm, Cole was telling the story of Wu and Zane facing Aspheera. Meanwhile, Lloyd and 'Red' were searching for the Titan Mech. An eagle appears and attacks them. Lloyd and Red enter a cave for safety. They realize that the Titan Mech was held there. Lloyd finds a message from Zane, he repairs the mech, and finally he and Red head out.
119	21	"The Traveler's Tree"	Shane Poettcker	Kevin Burke & Chris "Doc" Wyatt	December 28, 2019	0.46
Cole decides to climb a mountain to find a legendary Traveler's Tree where he encounters a Yeti which he has to fight.
120	22	"Krag's Lament"	Wade Cross	Kevin Burke & Chris "Doc" Wyatt	January 4, 2020	0.42
Jay and Nya were going up the mountain to go find Cole. Cole ends up in a cave where Krag was. He realizes that the Krag didn't want to hurt him. Krag shows Cole where the Traveler's Tree is and they find it. Jay and Nya meet Cole, who tells them that Krag wanted to help him.
121	23	"Secret of the Wolf"	Daniel Ife	Matt "Chato" Hill	January 4, 2020	0.42
Lloyd and Red take on their journey to find Zane. Meanwhile, A lightning bolt strikes, unleashing a robot. Red was hurt so Lloyd took her somewhere safe, but when Lloyd wakes up a girl named Akita comes out of nowhere and tries to tell Lloyd she is only a shapeshifter.
122	24	"The Last of the Formlings"	Daniel Ife	Kevin Burke & Chris "Doc" Wyatt	January 11, 2020	N/A
Akita tells her story to Lloyd. Akita and Kataru go alone to get their shapeshifting powers, and they both find them. Meanwhile, Boreal, Vex, and the Ice Emperor freeze the whole village. When Akita and Kataru arrive, Boreal freezes Kataru.: Note: This episode partly uses 2D animated style.
123	25	"My Enemy, My Friend"	Wade Cross	Bragi Schut	January 11, 2020	N/A
Boreal strikes again and lays waste to the Ice Fisher's village, forcing the Ninja to go after Lloyd. Lloyd and Akita take on their Journey to find Zane. But they get interrupted by Boreal and Lloyd and Akita fight him. Lloyd is hurt, and they take him to the Ice Palace and show the Ice Emperor, who is revealed to be Zane.
124	26	"The Kaiju Protocol"	Daniel Ife	Kevin Burke & Chris "Doc" Wyatt	January 18, 2020	N/A
Back in Ninjago City, Wu and P.I.X.A.L. attempt to locate the Never-Realm and accidentally unleash The Preeminent. Now P.I.X.A.L. has to send her back to the Departed Realm. This episode includes a crossover with Legends of Chima.
125	27	"Corruption"	Shane Poettcker	Bragi Schut	January 18, 2020	N/A
Vex, bitter and seeking revenge from his enemies, meets Zane, who has arrived in the Never-Realm and has lost all of his memories. He tricks Zane into believing he is the Ice Emperor, ruler of the realm with Vex being his trusty advisor. Prompted by Vex, Zane uses the Scroll of Forbidden Spinjitzu to brutally punish Vex's enemies and takes over the Never-Realm, placing it under an eternal winter.
126	28	"A Fragile Hope"	Wade Cross	Matt "Chato" Hill	January 25, 2020	N/A
Having discovered the terrible truth of Zane's fate, Lloyd tries to help him remember his true identity, but Vex persuades him into believing Lloyd is a liar. Lloyd is locked up in the dungeons, where he meets Kataru, Akita's brother who has been kept captive for a long time. When all hope seems lost, Grimfax frees them, having believed Lloyd's story and offering to team up with them. Meanwhile, the other Ninja are attacked by wolves, but prevail when they find the Land Bounty and repair it.
127	29	"Once and for All"	Shane Poettcker	Bragi Schut	January 25, 2020	N/A
Nya, Jay, Cole, and Kai face off against Boreal, while Lloyd confronts the Ice Emperor himself. Meanwhile, Kataru and Grimfax try to stop the ice army from getting to Lloyd. As Akita wanted revenge, she went to find the ice emperor and tried to kill him.
128	30	"Awakenings"	Shane Poettcker	Bragi Schut	February 1, 2020	N/A
Lloyd helps Zane regain his memories. Akita is reunited with Kataru, and the ninja are all reunited. They return to Ninjago city.

== Reception ==
Dan Bradley for TheHDRoom commented on the duality of the season, specifically in terms of the split structure that presents the Pyro Vipers (or fire serpents) and the Blizzard Samurai (or ice warriors) as the two groups of antagonists. This split theme of fire and ice was compared to Game of Thrones and A Song of Ice and Fire.

== Accolades ==
In 2020, Secrets of the Forbidden Spinjitzu was nominated for two awards in the Animation Series category of the Leo Awards for Art Direction and Sound.
