= Lego: The Adventures of Clutch Powers =

2010 animated film

- DVD Cover
- Directed by: Howard E. Baker
- Written by: Tom Rogers
- Produced by: Lawrence Kasanoff; Jimmy Ienner; Kristy Scanlan; Joshua R. Wexler
- Starring: Ryan McPartlin; Yvonne Strahovski; Jeff Bennett; Roger Rose; Paul Michael Glaser; Christopher Emerson; Gregg Berger; Chris Hardwick; Alex Desert; Stephan Cox
- Edited by: Michael D. Black
- Music by: David and Eric Wurst
- Production companies: Threshold Animation Studios; Tinseltown Toons; The LEGO Group
- Distributed by: Universal Studios Home Entertainment
- Release date: February 23, 2010
- Running time: 82 minutes
- Countries: United States; Denmark
- Language: English
- Box office: $69,988

Lego: The Adventures of Clutch Powers is a 2010 animated epic action comedy film. The film is based on the concept of the Lego toy series and is the first feature-length film based on the property. It stars the voices of Ryan McPartlin, Yvonne Strahovski, Roger Rose, Jeff Bennett, Paul Michael Glaser, Gregg Berger, Christopher Emerson and Alex Désert.

The film received positive reviews for the action and humor, although its animation and product placement were criticized.

== Plot ==
The film opens with Clutch Powers tunneling underground to find a Power Crystal, which awakens the Crystal King, a rock monster. After a chase, Clutch realizes the crystal he was carrying is actually the king's baby, and returns it. As a reward, the Crystal King gives him a Power Crystal. Clutch then returns to Lego City and hands the crystal to his boss, Kjeld Playwell, who assigns him a team: Brick Masterson, a firefighter; Peg Mooring, a biologist; and Bernie von Beam, an engineer. Playwell informs them about an incident on the Space Police prison planet.

Clutch and his team arrive at the prison planet and investigate, despite Clutch's preference for working alone. They are attacked by an unseen wizard, Mallock the Malign, who escapes with two criminals. The team frees the Watch Commander, who explains that all ships' spark plugs have been removed to prevent escapes. The criminals steal their ship and destroy the others. The team struggles to cooperate, leading Clutch to build a new ship on his own.

Clutch later claims responsibility for the failure, admitting he was distracted by a symbol referring to one of the criminals, Omega. Playwell tells them that Mallock terrorized the medieval planet Ashlar before being imprisoned. Ashlar's former king, Revet, sacrificed himself to protect the kingdom and his son, Prince Varen, who is now expected to rule, despite his lack of battle skills. Playwell orders Clutch's team to capture Mallock on Ashlar.

Arriving on Ashlar, the team accidentally destroys Lego-Henge and seeks refuge in an abandoned mine. They discover Mallock controls the planet with an army of skeletons and goblins. Clutch leaves to find Prince Varen and convince him to help fight Mallock. Meanwhile, Peg, Brick, and Bernie build a battle chariot. Clutch encounters Hogar, a troll, who demands answers to three riddles before allowing him to cross a bridge. Skelly and Bones, Mallock's skeletons, catch up with Clutch, but Hogar helps him escape. He shares the history of Prince Varen's father and his golden sword, which is key to defeating Mallock.

At the castle, Clutch finds Varen, but the prince is reluctant to fight Mallock, admitting he feels unqualified. Disappointed, Clutch returns to the camp, where a dwarf named Lofar offers help. Eventually, Varen and his knights agree to join the fight.

Clutch and Varen sneak into Mallock's castle disguised as Peg, but Mallock traps them in a bone cage. Meanwhile, Brick, Peg, Bernie, and Hogar fight off the skeletons. Hogar brings the chest containing the golden sword, but it's empty. After receiving a message from Clutch, Bernie rallies the team to rebuild the chariot. They regroup with the knights and battle the skeletons. Peg summons the dragon she befriended earlier to destroy the bone cage, freeing Clutch and Varen. Varen retrieves the golden sword and gains the courage to face Mallock, realizing he must protect his kingdom.

Mallock tries to trick Clutch into giving him the sword by promising to reveal his father's location, but Clutch refuses, declaring he's already found him. Varen uses the sword to defeat Mallock, trapping him with a glowing chain. Skelly and Bones fight Brick, but Bernie helps him defeat them. Varen overpowers Mallock with the sword's power, trapping him and declaring himself King of Ashlar.

After Mallock's defeat, Hogar is freed, and the skeleton army dissolves. The team celebrates, and Varen is officially crowned king. Clutch's team transports Mallock back to Lego City, where Playwell praises their efforts. However, the team's mission is still not over, as the other two criminals are still on the loose. Playwell informs of the next criminal Squidman and they prepare for their next adventure.

== Cast ==
- Ryan McPartlin as Clutch Powers
- Yvonne Strahovski as Peg Mooring
- Roger Rose as Brick Masterson
- Jeff Bennett as Bernie von Beam / Artie Fol
- Paul Michael Glaser as Kjeld Playwell
- Christopher Emerson as Prince Varen
- Stephan Cox as Mallock the Malign
- Alex Desert as Skelly
- Chris Hardwick as Bones
- Gregg Berger as Watch Commander / Rock Powers
- Richard Doyle as Hogar the Troll
- John Di Crosta as Lofar the Dwarf

== Release ==
LEGO: The Adventures of Clutch Powers was released direct-to-video on DVD on February 23, 2010. It was released on Blu-ray for the first time in Europe in June 2015, followed by a U.S. Blu-ray release in June 2019. A three-minute short film titled Clutch Powers: Bad Hair Day was included as a bonus feature on all releases.

While the DVD includes the moniker "The first LEGO movie on DVD," this is technically incorrect, as four movies based on the Bionicle theme had been released before it. However, it is the first LEGO film to feature the traditional minifigure character designs.

== Music ==
Songs included "I Work Alone" and "Nothing's Gonna Stop Us" by Micheal Lloyd and Greg O'Connor.

== Reception ==
=== Commercial performance ===
The film grossed $69,988 in South Korea. In its opening weekend, the film grossed $38,668 in 63 theatres, with an average of $613 per theatre.

=== Critical reception ===
Common Sense Media gave it 3 out of 5 stars, saying it was a "clever, witty adventure--but also one big Lego ad".

== Legacy ==
In April 2010, a 4D attraction based on the film titled A Clutch Powers 4D Adventure premiered at LEGOLAND Windsor and LEGOLAND California. In 2012, it opened at additional locations, including LEGOLAND Billund and LEGOLAND Malaysia. The attraction was replaced with The LEGO Movie 4D: A New Adventure in 2016.

Clutch Powers has appeared as a recurring character in the animated series Ninjago. He was first mentioned by Cole as a collector of priceless artifacts and as the maker of the Blade Cup, a trophy for performing artists and entertainers, in episode 9 of season 1, "The Royal Blacksmiths". He made his first appearance in the eleventh season, and reappeared in the miniseries and fourteenth season. The name is a tribute to the term the LEGO Group uses in quality control tests to describe characteristics of the ABS plastic: "clutch power" describes the force with which studs and anti-studs adhere.
