= Lloyd Garmadon =

Fictional character in Ninjago TV series

- Ninjago character
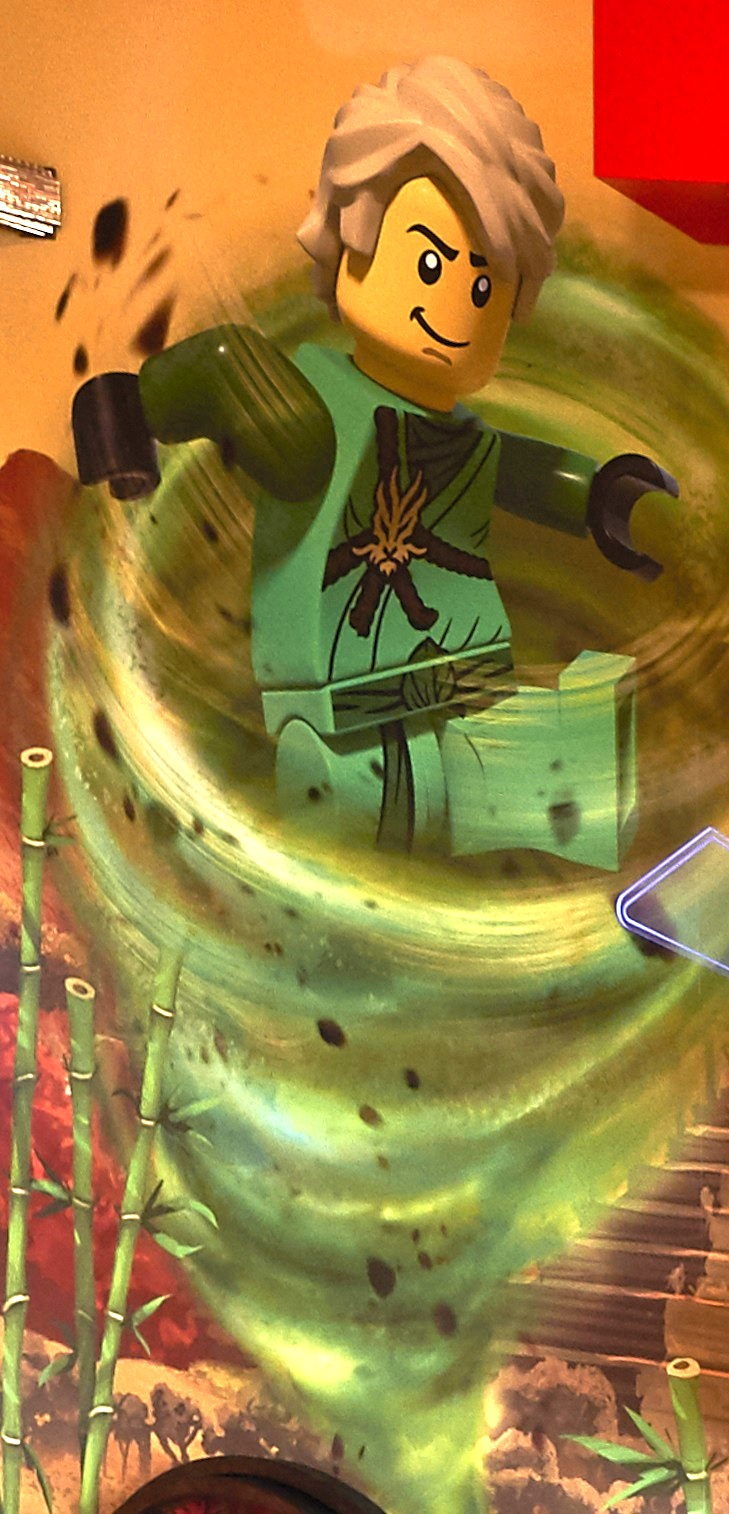
- The character depicted in the Ninjago room in Hotel Legoland at the Legoland Billund Resort in Denmark
- First appearance: Ninjago: Rise of the Snakes (2011)
- Created by: Dan and Kevin Hageman
- Voiced by: Jillian Michaels (2011–2017; 2026); Sam Vincent (2018–present); Dave Franco (The Lego Ninjago Movie)

In-universe information
- Full name: Lloyd Montgomery Garmadon
- Aliases: The Green Ninja; Elemental Master of Life; The Ultimate Spinjitzu Master; The Golden Ninja (briefly)
- Species: Human with Oni and Dragon blood
- Gender: Male
- Occupation: Leader of the Ninja Team
- Affiliation: Ninja Team; Elemental Masters
- Weapon: Dao; Katana
- Family: Garmadon (father); Misako (mother); The First Spinjitzu Master (paternal grandfather); Wu (paternal uncle)
- Home: Ninjago Island

Lloyd Montgomery Garmadon is a fictional character in the animated television series Ninjago (previously known as Ninjago: Masters of Spinjitzu) and its sequel series Ninjago: Dragons Rising, produced by The Lego Group. He was created by the original Ninjago screenwriters, Dan and Kevin Hageman, and first appeared in the first season of Ninjago, titled Rise of the Snakes, released in December 2011. A different incarnation of Lloyd also served as the main protagonist of The Lego Ninjago Movie, released in September 2017. Jillian Michaels voiced Lloyd in the first seven seasons of the television series before being replaced by Sam Vincent from the eighth season onward. Dave Franco voiced the character in the film.

In the series, Lloyd develops from a young boy aspiring to become a powerful villain like his father, Lord Garmadon, to his main role as the legendary Green Ninja, a prophesied hero within the lore of the series, who is destined to protect the land of Ninjago from the forces of evil. He is also the Elemental Master of Life, which gives him a range of elemental powers, such as shooting green energy beams at enemies and passively shielding his body.

Lloyd is portrayed as the strongest member and eventual leader of a team of six teenage ninja, which is formed in the pilot episodes of Ninjago. The original team consists of just four members, and Lloyd joins their team in the first season. In both the series and film, the storyline repeatedly places him in opposition to Lord Garmadon, his father and prophesied enemy. Although many other villains appear in the series, this complicated relationship between father and son is an overarching storyline in the show's portrayal of the battle between good and evil.

From its launch, the Ninjago series achieved continued popularity amongst its target audience, with Lloyd being a consistently popular character. He is depicted in numerous short films, children's books, graphic novels and other media, and has also been repeatedly released in Lego minifigure form as part of the Lego Ninjago sets that coincide with each Ninjago season.

== Concept and creation ==
=== Development ===
Tommy Andreasen's original 2010 concept drawing for Lloyd Garmadon. His shirt says "Evil rocks!"

In 2009, The Lego Group proposed to make a series about ninja, planning for four ninja to be Elemental Masters. The Lego Ninjago theme concept originated from the Lego Ninja theme, which was released by Lego in 1998. In 2011, Ninjago: Masters of Spinjitzu was launched, which included concepts from the Lego Ninja theme, such as dragons and fortresses inspired by ancient Japan. These concepts were also combined with a modern setting. The series was created by Michael Hegner and Tommy Andreasen, two Danish film producers. The character of Lloyd Garmadon was conceived by two screenwriters, Dan and Kevin Hageman, following the pilot season. The first sketch depicting Lloyd Garmadon was created in 2010 by co-creator Tommy Andreasen. The Hageman Brothers have stated that "Lloyd" Garmadon was created as a pun on "Lord" Garmadon.

The Ninjago: Masters of Spinjitzu series was animated in Copenhagen, Denmark, by Wil Film ApS for its first ten seasons. The production was relocated to WildBrain Studios in Canada with the release of the eleventh season, Secrets of the Forbidden Spinjitzu, and the show's title was shortened to Ninjago. This marked the use of new animation styles, including anime-style 2D animation, as a way to experiment with the storyline and add new aspects to the show. The run-time for the show was also revised from 22 minutes to 11 minutes.

The eighth season, Sons of Garmadon, implemented a new phase for the ninjas' designs, which were inspired by their movie counterparts in The Lego Ninjago Movie. Lloyd was noticeably older in appearance, which was further illustrated by the introduction of a new voice actor. The design changes aimed to help new fans introduced to the franchise through the movie transition into watching the television series.

=== Voice actors ===
For seasons one to seven of the Ninjago series, Lloyd was voiced by Jillian Michaels. However, after the release of The Lego Ninjago Movie and the subsequent changes in character designs in season eight, Lloyd was voiced by Sam Vincent. In the 2017 film, titled The Lego Ninjago Movie, Lloyd was voiced by Dave Franco.

== Description ==
Lloyd is recognisable by his green gi, the ninja outfit that he typically wears in the Ninjago series and across the Lego Ninjago franchise. The design of his gi changes multiple times in the series, but he is usually depicted wearing a hood and mask when in combat. He is typically portrayed using a katana as his signature weapon, but switches to a dao after season eight.

In his first appearance, Lloyd is portrayed as a minor antagonist who makes childish attempts to perform evil deeds, such as robbing villagers of candy and pulling pranks. (Note: Ninjago, Season 1, Episode 1: "Rise of the Snakes") He is also depicted attempting to conquer Ninjago, but failing due to his immaturity. (Note: Ninjago, Season 1, Episode 2: "Home") As the story develops, he is taken into the care of his uncle, Master Wu, and redeemed from the path of evil. Throughout subsequent seasons, Lloyd's character is developed from a mischievous child into a wise and skilled ninja. By the seventh season, Hands of Time, he is portrayed as a fully developed character, ready to take on the role of leader of the team. (Note: Ninjago, Season 7, Episode 8: "Pause and Effect") At the beginning of the eighth season, Sons of Garmadon, Lloyd is further developed into a late teen and appears visibly older, most notably through a deeper voice provided by a new voice actor. (Note: Ninjago, Season 8, Episode 1: "The Mask of Deception") His character is also presented as more mature, often shown displaying wisdom beyond his years. From the eleventh season onward, Lloyd's character is consistently portrayed as a calm and confident team leader, able to make quick decisions when facing adversity. (Note: Ninjago, Season 11, Episode 1: "Wasted True Potential")

Chronologically, Lloyd is the youngest member of the ninja team (although his age is not clearly defined). He and the other ninja have been described as "grown-up teenagers". (Note: Ninjago, Season 9, Episode 5: "The Guilded Path") In The Lego Ninjago Movie, Lloyd's age is stated to be 16.

== Abilities ==
In the Ninjago series, Lloyd is described as an "Elemental Master", one of several characters who can manipulate an "element". In Lloyd's case, he is the Elemental Master of Life, which draws its power from his connection and gives him the ability to manipulate energy in various ways, such as shooting green energy blasts at his enemies, creating explosions of energy, and creating an energy shield to protect his body from attack. (Note: Ninjago, Season 3, Episode 7: "The Void") These powers first begin to develop in the second season, Legacy of the Green Ninja. (Note: Ninjago, Season 2, Episode 3: "Double Trouble") Lloyd's powers are shown to become progressively stronger, as he develops the ability to form balls of energy and shoot energy blasts. (Note: Ninjago, Season 2, Episode 5: "Child's Play") Towards the end of the second season, Lloyd's powers are depicted at their greatest strength when he reaches his true potential, becoming the Golden Ninja. He uses this "Golden Power" to destroy the Overlord, the main antagonist of the season, in an explosion of light. (Note: Ninjago, Season 2, Episode 13: "Rise of the Spinjitzu Master") However, in the third season, titled Rebooted, Lloyd voluntarily gives up his Golden Power, leaving just his elemental energy powers remaining. (Note: Ninjago, Season 3, Episode 6: "Codename: Arcturus")

In early seasons, Lloyd's powers are shown to be connected to the elemental powers of the original four ninja. He is consistently portrayed as the strongest Elemental Master, which is explained by the fact that he can harness all of other ninja's elemental powers. (Note: Ninjago, Season 2, Episode 2: :Pirates vs. Ninja:) Over the course of the series, Lloyd's elemental power is sometimes temporarily lost. This is particularly evident in the eighth season, Sons of Garmadon, in which Lloyd is shown to completely lose his elemental powers after losing a brutal fight with Lord Garmadon. (Note: Ninjago, Season 8, Episode 9: "True Potential") Like the other ninja, Lloyd also has the ability to use his elemental powers to summon an elemental vehicle or energy dragon at will. (Note: Ninjago, Season 3, Episode 4: "The Curse of the Golden Master") (Note: Ninjago, Season 4, Episode 6: "Spellbound")

In the first season, Lloyd is shown to have no experience in combat, but is subsequently trained by the ninja in the second season. As part of this combat training, Lloyd is shown to develop his skills in the art of "Spinjitzu", a fictional martial arts technique, in which the characters rotate rapidly to create a tornado of their elemental power. (Note: Ninjago, Season 2, Episode 2: "Pirates vs. Ninja") When Lloyd is developed into a young teenager, he is shown to have acquired the physical skill and focus to become a confident and skilled warrior. (Note: Ninjago, Season 2, Episode 6: "Wrong Place, Wrong Time") In addition to these skills, the writers also depict Lloyd and the ninja repeatedly using Spinjitzu to form a "Tornado of Creation" to defeat enemies, which involves the characters combining their individual Spinjitzu tornadoes. (Note: Ninjago, Season 10, Episode 4: "Endings") In the fifth season, titled Possession, a new skill called "Airjitzu" is introduced, which is similar to Spinjitzu, but allows the characters to levitate off the ground. (Note: Ninjago, Season 5, Episode 5: "Peak-a-Boo")

== Appearances ==
=== Ninjago TV series ===
From his first appearance in the television series in 2011, Lloyd's fictional family history is placed at the center of both the main storyline and the lore of the show. Significantly, he is positioned as the grandson of the First Spinjitzu Master, who is described as the legendary inventor of the show's fictional martial art of "Spinjitzu" and the creator of Ninjago. (Note: Ninjago, Season 8, Episode 3: "The Oni and the Dragon") He is also the son of Lord Garmadon, the elder son of the First Spinjitzu Master, and Misako, an archaeologist. The series incorporates a backstory relating how Lloyd's father was consumed by darkness and cast into another realm called the Underworld by Lloyd's uncle, Wu. These events are shown to have a major impact on Lloyd's character, who is presented growing up without knowing his father, but desiring to follow in his footsteps. (Note: Ninjago, Season 1, Episode 4: "Never Trust a Snake") In the first season, the prophecy of the Green Ninja is revealed, who is destined to rise above the other ninja and save Ninjago from a dark lord. (Note: Ninjago, Season 1, Episode 1: "Rise of the Snakes")

Lloyd makes his debut in the first season, Rise of the Snakes, as a mischievous child desiring to be an evil warlord like his father. The story portrays him attempting to prove himself by conquering Ninjago, but failing. This then leads to him being taken into the care of Master Wu. It is later revealed that Lloyd is destined to become the prophesied Green Ninja, which consequently results in an inevitable confrontation with his father. (Note: Ninjago, Season 1, Episode 10: "The Green Ninja") In the second season, titled Legacy of the Green Ninja, the story centers on the ninja training Lloyd to develop his fighting skills and learn the fictional martial art of Spinjitzu. Meanwhile, his father is shown plotting to conquer Ninjago. In the episode "Child's Play", Lloyd is magically aged up to an adolescent. The show illustrates his powers developing in strength until the season finale, which culminates in Lloyd unlocking his "Golden Power" and defeating the Overlord, an entity of pure evil.

In the third season, Rebooted, the Overlord returns as a digital entity without physical form. The story depicts him capturing Lloyd and draining him of most of his Golden Power. After escaping the Overlord, Lloyd gives up what is left of his Golden Power to his teammates, and returns to the title of Green Ninja. In the season finale, the Digital Overlord is ultimately defeated by a member of the ninja team named Zane, who is seemingly destroyed. In the final episode, the story shows how this loss results in the dissolution of the ninja team. However, in the following season, Lloyd is shown attempting to rebuild it. The fourth season, titled Tournament of Elements, involves the ninja travelling to an island in search of Zane, whom they believe is alive on the island, where they compete in Master Chen's Tournament of Elements. After discovering Chen's true plan to conquer Ninjago, Lloyd and the ninja are shown making an alliance with several other Elemental Masters to fight against Chen and his army. The plot is resolved with Garmadon making the decision to sacrifice himself in order to save Ninjago, which is shown to leave Lloyd with feelings of loss for his father.

In the fifth season, titled Possession, events in the story show Lloyd being possessed by the spirit of an Elemental Master named Morro. In subsequent seasons, the ninja are pitted against other villains, including a djinn named Nadakhan in the sixth season, Skybound, and Krux and Acronix, the Elemental Masters of Time, in the seventh season, Hands of Time. Although he initially struggles to gain the respect of the ninja, Lloyd eventually develops the confidence and maturity to become the permanent leader of the team.

In the eighth season, Sons of Garmadon, Lloyd is portrayed developing romantic feelings for a character named Princess Harumi, who is eventually revealed to be "The Quiet One", the leader of a criminal biker gang called the Sons of Garmadon. She resurrects Lord Garmadon in a ritual that only brings back his evil characteristics. This event is shown to have enormous impact on Lloyd, who decides to confront his father alone. He is nearly killed and loses his elemental powers, and believes the rest of his team to be dead, not knowing they escaped to another realm. In the ninth season titled Hunted, Garmadon conquers Ninjago with a giant stone monster, which forces Lloyd and his allies to go into hiding. He finds his voice and strength to encourage the citizens of Ninjago, his team, and himself to keep fighting. The story culminates in Lloyd facing Garmadon once more and defeating him, as well as the rest of the ninja team returning to Ninjago. (Note: Ninjago, Season 9, Episode 10: "Green Destiny")

In the following seasons, Lloyd is portrayed leading the ninja to successfully defeat several other villains and their armies, including a demonic race called the Oni in the tenth season, March of the Oni, a snake queen named Aspheera in the eleventh season, Secrets of the Forbidden Spinjitzu, a sentient video game named Unagami in the twelfth season, Prime Empire, an evil Skull Sorcerer in the thirteenth season, Master of the Mountain, an underwater tyrant named Prince Kalmaar in the fourteenth season, Seabound, and a council made up of their previous adversaries led by the Overlord in the final season, Crystalized.

=== Ninjago: Dragons Rising ===
Several years after a coalescence that merged all the realms (known as the Merge), Lloyd begins to train Arin, a fan whom he saved during the coalescence, and Sora, a prodigy inventor and Elemental Master of Technology, to become ninja. Together, they protect Riyu, a baby dragon with connections to Sora's power, from a faction of dragon hunters called the Claws of Imperium. All the while, Lloyd attempts to relocate the rest of his team, who were separated due in the Merge. He reunites with Kai, Zane, Cole, and Nya, as well as recruiting Wyldfyre, a teen raised by a dragon.

A year after the fall of the Claws of Imperium, its leader, Ras had discover an ancient tribe called the Wolf Clan, and recruits Imperium scientist Jordana and Cinder, the new Master of Smoke. Discovering they possess an ancient forbidden art called Shatterspin, Lloyd and the ninja approach two ancient dragons to teach them an art that'll counteract Shatterspin. Lloyd, plagued with nightmares, discovers Ras intends to free a tribe called the Forbidden Five and was successful with only one after Kai was banished in the process. When three matriarch dragons were murdered, Lloyd and the ninja participate in a tournament to find the culprits, as well as discovering an amnesiac Jay was working for Ras. Eventually, it was discovered that the freed member of the Forbidden Five and Jordana, who had been possessed by another member. Upon freeing Kai, the ninja attempt to fight back, only for the freed Forbidden Five to retreat with Ras and Arin by his side after being deceived by the former.

Many weeks after the Tournament, Lloyd took up Arin's old friend Frak as a new student before they, Zane, and Sora attempt to search for Arin, effectively learning the Forbidden Five want to revive Thunderfang, a dragon obsessed to become a Source Dragon by gathering five swords called Prismatic Blades. Offering a temporary alliance with Arin, the Ninja attempt to stop the Five, who succeed in freeing Thunderfang, who absorbs Lloyd's soul, until Arin revived him by killing Thunderfang before leaving with Ras, joined by Sora. Upon learning from Jay, who became a bounty hunter, that Arin's parents were alive, Lloyd heads to the Land of Lee alongside Nya, Wyldfyre, and Jay before eventually finding them, and Arin and Sora return after Ras attempted to kill Sora for a new weapon. Learning Thunderfang is gathering souls, the Ninja learn from Bleckt, Roby's treacherous uncle, that a dragon called the Arc Dragon of Focus can defeat him, they split in three ways to get the necessary components while Lloyd and Arin confront Thunderfang and defeat him, once and for all, at the cost of his Elemental Powers, due to using the Arc Dragon without the Source Dragons' consent before he and Arin end up in a distant realm after Ras tampered with the portal gate.

Discovering he must go through a ritual, Lloyd enters the portal, encountering his young, tween, and opposite selves in tests. Although he fails the trial, the remaining Source Dragons assist him and he gains the ability to stabilize the Elemental Powers, as well as a dragon form. He and the original ninja later journey to the Never Kingdoms to destroy a dangerous weapon known as the Weapon of Desolation, which ultimately cost him his mortal body, reducing him to a ghost-like state.

=== The Lego Ninjago Movie ===
Lloyd is the protagonist of The Lego Ninjago Movie, released in 2017. Although the plot is not directly related to the Ninjago television series, Lloyd retains his role as the Green Ninja and leader of the secret ninja force. The film focuses on Lloyd defending Ninjago City from his evil father, Lord Garmadon, who makes regular attempts to conquer Ninjago City with the help of his Shark Army. Lloyd is universally despised for being the son of an evil warlord, but the citizens of Ninjago City are unaware that he is the Green Ninja. Lloyd and the ninja fight Garmadon and his minions using their mechs, until Lloyd uses the "Ultimate Weapon" (a laser pointer) on Garmadon, which attracts a live-action cat named Meowthra, who starts to destroy the city. To put an end to the destruction, Lloyd and the ninja must go on a perilous journey to find the "Ultimate, Ultimate Weapon" with Garmadon in tow. On the journey, Lloyd spends time with his father and bonds with him in the process. At the end of the film, Lloyd reveals that he is the Green Ninja, having saved Ninjago City from Meowthra, and is reconciled with his father. He also learns that his green energy power means life and connects all living things in the way that he is connected to his family and the ninja.

== Merchandise ==
Lloyd and the ninja have been released numerous times in Lego minifigure form, as part of the Lego Ninjago playsets developed alongside the series. Since 2011, the Lego Ninjago themed sets have been released in waves each year to correspond with the Ninjago seasons. The playsets in each wave feature some of the main locations, vehicles, mechs, weapons and characters from the corresponding season, including Lloyd and the ninja dressed in their current designs.

== Other media ==
Lloyd appears alongside the other ninja characters in magazines, short films, video games, coloring books, graphic novels, children's books, and a theme park ride.

=== Theme park attractions ===
A 4D short animated film titled Lego Ninjago: Master of the 4th Dimension, was released in Legoland on 12 January 2018, featuring Lloyd and the ninja. The plot focuses on Master Wu teaching the ninja a lesson about the Scroll of the 4th Dimension, which affects gravity and organized matter. Lloyd and the ninja also appear in an interactive theme park ride called Lego Ninjago: The Ride at Legoland.

Mascots of the character appeared at various events and at shopping centers across the UK in 2016 and 2017.

=== Publications ===
Various accompanying books to the Ninjago series have been produced featuring Lloyd and the ninja. A total of 12 graphic novels have been published, written by Greg Farshtey. Since the beginning of 2012, a Lego Ninjago magazine has been released in the UK and the Netherlands every month, containing a comic strip, facts, puzzles, posters, competitions and other activities.

=== Movies and mini-movies ===
In 2014, he also makes a cameo appearance in The Lego Movie. Lloyd along with the other ninja appeared in a short teaser for the film, titled "Enter the Ninjago". Several mini-movies have been produced alongside the Ninjago television series, which include appearances from Lloyd and the ninja:
Wu's Teas - A collection of 20 shorts that focus on Master Wu's tea shop, released in 2017.
Ninjago: Decoded - A mini-series of ten episodes which takes place between Hands of Time and Sons of Garmadon, released on 27 November 2017.
Tales from the Monastery of Spinjitzu - Six short films from the Lego website, released on 19 December 2018.
Prime Empire Original Shorts - Six shorts that provide additional background information about Prime Empire, released in 2020.
Ninjago: Reimagined - Five shorts in different animations styles released in 2021 to celebrate the series' 10th anniversary.
The Virtues of Spinjitzu - Six shorts in which Master Wu teaches the six virtues of Spinjitzu, released in 2022.
Ninjago - Dream Team - A twenty-minute short in collaboration with the Lego Dreamzzz franchise.

=== Video games and apps ===
Lloyd appears as a playable character in a variety of video games and mobile games, including: Lego Ninjago: Nindroids (2014), The Lego Movie Videogame (2014), Lego Ninjago: Shadow of Ronin (2015), Lego Dimensions (2015), Lego Worlds (2017), The Lego Ninjago Movie Video Game (2017), Lego Brawls (2019) and Lego Legacy: Heroes Unboxed (2020).

== Reception ==
Lloyd's turbulent relationship with his father, Lord Garmadon, received some positive comments among film critics following his appearance in The Lego Ninjago Movie. Movieguide noted that the movie has a "strong pro-family worldview", and that "the reconciliation between Lloyd and his father leads to the father's redemption" and that "the movie promotes family reconciliation". Julian Roman of Movieweb also commented that "The Lego Ninjago Movie is essentially about a father and son reconnecting". On 13 August 2021, Graeme Virtue of The Guardian included Lloyd Garmadon on a list of "ten of the best ninjas in pop culture".

== Influence and legacy ==
Lloyd has become a widely recognizable character among the show's target audience, who are mainly primary-aged children and teenagers. His appearance as the protagonist in The Lego Ninjago Movie in 2017 introduced the character to a wider mainstream audience. Lloyd's popularity as a character has been maintained for over a decade, since his first appearance in 2011. This resulted in many primary-aged children growing up watching the character and taking their appreciation into adulthood.

The popularity of the character has been partly attributed to his relatability as a typical teenager with everyday problems. Christopher Stamp, Senior Designer at Lego, stated, "None of the characters are perfect, they are all flawed and I think that is something everyone can relate to". This relatability was also demonstrated in The Lego Ninjago Movie. Dave Franco, voice actor of Lloyd in the movie, commented "It's particularly hard for Lloyd because, during the day, he's a tortured high school kid and everyone hates him because of the fact his dad is so awful. But then, at night, he becomes the Green Ninja and he protects everyone from Garmadon, yet he doesn't get any of the glory because no one knows he's the Green Ninja".

Lloyd's role as the protagonist has been influential in terms of the messaging that has come out of the show and the movie. Plugged In noted that Lloyd's story is an exploration of familial bonds and focuses on the character's longing for a deeper father-son connection. "As the story unfolds, we witness the transforming power of a loving relationship as well as the difference forgiveness and communication can make in a broken one". The Ninjago series intentionally tried to teach children messages about the importance of inclusivity, friendship, confidence, and staying true to oneself, in which Lloyd embodies a positive role model to children. Michael Svane Knap remarked that "Some have grown up with Lego Ninjago and are now expressing their gratitude and telling us how they have learned lifelong skills".

== See also ==
- Lego Ninjago
- List of Ninjago characters
- Ninjago (TV series)
