= Kirby Morrow =

Canadian actor (1973–2020)

- Morrow in 2008
- Born: Kirby Robert Morrow; August 28, 1973; Jasper, Alberta, Canada
- Died: November 18, 2020 (aged 47); Vancouver, British Columbia, Canada
- Resting place: Cremated; ashes scattered into the ocean near Stanley Park, Vancouver, British Columbia
- Occupations: Actor; comedian; writer
- Years active: 1994–2020

Kirby Robert Morrow (August 28, 1973 – November 18, 2020) was a Canadian actor, comedian and writer. In animation, he was known as the voice of Miroku from Inuyasha, its four movies, and Inuyasha: The Final Act, Van Fanel from the Ocean dub of Escaflowne, Cyclops from X-Men: Evolution, Jay from Class of the Titans, Teru Mikami from Death Note, Trowa Barton from Mobile Suit Gundam Wing, Rey Za Burrel from Mobile Suit Gundam SEED Destiny, Ryo Takatsuki from Project ARMS, Goku from Ocean Productions' dub of Dragon Ball Z (from Episode 160 onwards), Hot Shot from Transformers: Cybertron and his main role as Cole from LEGO Ninjago: Masters of Spinjitzu. On camera, he was known for the recurring role of Captain Dave Kleinman from Stargate Atlantis.

== Life and career ==
Morrow was born in Jasper, Alberta on August 28, 1973, to Dawn and Thomas Morrow, and graduated with a degree in theatre at Mount Royal University in Calgary. He worked in Vancouver, British Columbia, for most of his acting career. Morrow's grandfather, Robert Morrow, was born in Poyntzpass, Ireland in 1902, to Robert Morrow and Susan Davison. He married Alice McTague, from County Antrim.

== Death ==
Morrow died at the age of 47 on November 18, 2020. His death was announced on Facebook by his brother, Casey Morrow, and linked to a long history of alcohol abuse.

On December 4, 2020, Casey established the Kirby Morrow Memorial Scholarship Fund to help others pursue education in the performing arts.

Morrow was cremated and his ashes scattered into the ocean near Stanley Park.

== Filmography ==
=== Live-action ===
List of acting performances in film and television
Year	Title	Role	Notes
1996	Stand Against Fear	Nelson Doyle	Television film
1997	Sombrio	Drive	
1997	Moment of Truth: Into the Arms of Danger	Man At Truck Stop	Television film
1997	Viper	Tim Vernon	
1997	Breaker High	Philippe	
1997–1998	Ninja Turtles: The Next Mutation	Michelangelo	Voice
1997–1998	The Outer Limits	Kirby	
1998	Playing to Win: A Moment of Truth Movie	Ryan	Television film
1998	Silencing Mary	Head Cheerleader	Television film
1998	Storm Chasers: Revenge of the Twister	Storm Chaser	
1998	Someone to Love Me	Ryan	
1998	Highlander: The Raven	Marco Becker	Episode: "Passion Play"
1998-2002	Stargate SG-1	Militia Man / Tara'c	2 episodes
1999	Total Recall 2070	Beta Class Android	Episode: "Baby Lottery"
1999	The Hunt for the Unicorn Killer	John Maddux	Television film
1999	First Wave	Quentin Billup	Episode: "Ohio Players"
1999	Jerry's Day	Jerry	
2000	MVP: Most Valuable Primate	Tiger #1	
2001	Seven Days	Rick Hedstrom	Episode: "The First Freshman"
2001	Avalanche Alley	Jake	Television film
2001	Bones	Palmer	
2001	Special Unit 2	Scott Caputo	Episode: "The Wall"
2002	Slap Shot 2: Breaking the Ice	Ash	Direct-to-video
2002	L.A. Law: The Movie	Young Man	Television film
2002	Jeremiah	Angus Deveraux	Episode: "The Touch"
2003	Out of Order	Brad	Miniseries
2004	Behind the Camera: The Unauthorized Story of 'Charlie's Angels'		Uncredited; Television film
2005–2006	Stargate Atlantis	Captain Dave Kleinman	8 episodes
2006	Deadly Skies	Guard Carmichael	Television film
2007	Blood Ties	Brady	Episode: "Deadly Departed"
2007	Glimpse	Troy	
2008	The Triple Eight	Catty Platter Guy	
2009	The L Word	Randy Griff	Episode: "Least Likely"
2009	Something Evil Comes	Edwin Vaster	Television film
2010	The Bridge	Mac	Episode: "The Blame Game"
2010	Stargate Universe	Captain Dave Kleinman	Episode: "Incursion: Part 1"
2010	Supernatural	Ex-Husband	Episode: "Two and a Half Men"
2010	Life Unexpected	Tasha's Lawyer	Episode: "Stand Taken"
2011	Human Target	Eddie	Episode: "Cool Hand Guerrero"
2011	Mortal Kombat: Legacy	King Jerrod	Web series
2011	The Pastor's Wife	Walt Freeland	Television film
2012	Fringe	Maddox & Maddox (Canaan)	Episode: "Everything in Its Right Place"
2012	Arrow	Matt Istook	Episode: "An Innocent Man"
2012	Maximum Conviction	MP #2	
2014	Spooksville	Coach MacGillis	Episode: "Phone Fear"
2014	A Ring by Spring	Tom Halsey	Television film
2015	Olympus	General Dion	Episode: "The Temple of Gaia"
2015	Cedar Cove	Doug Lambert	Episode: "Something's Gotta Give"
2015	12 Rounds 3: Lockdown	Saul	
2015	The Flash	Coach	Episode: "The Fury of Firestorm"
2016	Van Helsing	Gary	2 episodes
2016	Travelers	Hickman	Episode: "Donner"
2017	Legion	Benny	Recurring
2017	Drone	Dave Wistin	
2017	The Good Doctor	Ethan	Episode: "Burnt Food"
2018	Supergirl	Dean Petrocelli	3 episodes

=== Anime ===
List of English dubbing performances in animation
Year	Title	Role	Notes
1999	Brain Powerd	Jonathan Glenn	
1999	Z-Mind	Akira	
2000	Mobile Suit Gundam	Woody Malden	
2000–2001	Mobile Suit Gundam Wing	Trowa Barton	
2000–2001	The Vision of Escaflowne	Van Fanel	Ocean/Bandai dub
2000–2003	Dragon Ball Z	Goku	Ocean dub
2002–2006	Inuyasha	Miroku/Son Goku's descendant (2 episodes)	
2002–2004	Project ARMS series	Ryo Takatsuki	
2002	Hamtaro	Noel	
2002–2003	Transformers: Armada	Rad White	
2003–2004	MegaMan NT Warrior	ElecMan.EXE/Speedy Dave	Also Axess
2003	Infinite Ryvius	Yuki Aiba	
2003	Meltylancer: The Animation	Defiant A	
2004	Popotan	Daichi (Adult)	Ep7
2004	The Family's Defensive Alliance	Hayakawa / Alpha #1 / Yashiro's Underling	
2004–2005	Transformers: Energon	Rad White	
2005	Star Ocean EX	Allen	
2005	Tokyo Underground	Sui	
2005–2006	Transformers: Cybertron	Hot Shot	
2005	Hikaru no Go	Ito	
2005	Starship Operators	Takai Kiryu	
2006–2007	Mobile Suit Gundam SEED Destiny	Rey Za Burrel	
2006	Ōban Star-Racers	Prince Aikka	
2006	.hack//Roots	Gord	
2007	Ayakashi: Samurai Horror Tales	Zushonosuke Himekawa	
2008–2009	Mobile Suit Gundam 00	Billy Katagiri	
2008	Death Note	Teru Mikami	
2012–2013	Inuyasha: The Final Act	Miroku	
2012	Kurozuka	Hasegawa	
2016	Kingdom series	Ze Gui / Lord Changping / Li Bai	
2017	Gintama°	Tsukuyo (Genderbend)	
2020	Yashahime: Princess Half-Demon	Miroku	Premiere: "InuYasha: Since Then" (last role before his death)

=== Animation ===
List of voice performances in animation
Year	Title	Role	Notes
1998–1999	Brats of the Lost Nebula	Zadam	
1999–2001	NASCAR Racers	Redline	
2000–2004	Yvon of the Yukon	Tommy Tukyuk, additional voices	
2000–2001	Kong: The Animated Series	Jason Jenkins	
2000–2003	X-Men: Evolution	Cyclops / Scott Summers	
2000	Action Man	Jimmy Woo	
2000–2002	What About Mimi?	Trevor / Additional Voices	Episode: "Outta Sync"
2001–2002	Ultimate Book of Spells		
2001–2002	Alienators: Evolution Continues	Dr. Ira Kane	
2002	Mary-Kate and Ashley in Action!	Additional Voices	
2003	Broken Saints	Raimi / Boat Thug #2	
2003	Hot Wheels: World Race	Chuvo	
2005	Kong: King of Atlantis	Jason Jenkins	
2005	Hot Wheels: AcceleRacers	Shirako Takamoto	
2005–2008	Class of the Titans	Jay	Main cast
2006–2007	Team Galaxy	Josh	
2007–2010	Care Bears: Adventures in Care-a-lot	Champ Bear	
2011–2021	Ninjago	Cole, additional voices	Main cast
2011–2020	Superbook	Adam, additional voices	
2012	Action Dad	Rico / Taxi Driver	
2013	Slugterra	Game Master	Episode: "The Thrill of the Game"
2013	Lego Star Wars: The Yoda Chronicles	Anakin Skywalker, General Grievous	
2013	Ultimate Wolverine vs. Hulk	Tony Stark	Motion comic
2014	Eternals	Ajak, Iron Man, Orlando, Hospital Supervisor	Motion comic
2015	Lego Star Wars: Droid Tales	Anakin Skywalker, General Grievous, additional voices	
2017	Nexo Knights	Slab Rockowski	1 episode
2019	Lego Jurassic World: Legend of Isla Nublar	Larson Mitchell	

=== Film ===
List of voice and English dubbing performances in films
Year	Title	Role	Notes
2001	Gundam Wing: Endless Waltz	Trowa Barton	
2001	Barbie in the Nutcracker	Nutcracker / Prince Eric	Direct-to-video
2002	Escaflowne	Van Fanel	Ocean / Bandai dub
2004	My Scene: Jammin' in Jamaica	Hudson	
2004	Inuyasha the Movie: Affections Touching Across Time	Miroku	
2004	Inuyasha the Movie: The Castle Beyond the Looking Glass	Miroku	
2005	Inuyasha the Movie: Swords of an Honorable Ruler	Miroku	
2005	Dragons II: The Metal Ages	Gorhagar	Television film
2005	Ark	Rogan	
2005	My Scene Goes Hollywood: The Movie	Hudson	Direct-to-video
2005	Hot Wheels: AcceleRacers	Shirako Takamoto	Direct-to-video
2005	Hot Wheels AcceleRacers: The Speed of Silence	Shirako Takamoto	
2005	Hot Wheels AcceleRacers: Breaking Point	Shirako Takamoto	
2005	Hot Wheels AcceleRacers: The Ultimate Race	Shirako Takamoto	
2006	Inuyasha the Movie: Fire on the Mystic Island	Miroku	
2006	Kong: Return to the Jungle	Jason Jenkins	Direct-to-video
2007	Mosaic	Mosaic	
2008	At Jesus Side	Jesus, Vendor	
2009	Hulk Versus	Additional Voices	Uncredited; Direct-to-video
2011	Mobile Suit Gundam 00 the Movie: A Wakening of the Trailblazer	Billy Katagiri	
2013	Escape from Planet Earth	Hazmats / Baabian Citizens	

=== Video games ===
List of voice and English dubbing performances in video games
Year	Title	Role	Notes
2000	Kessen	Hideyori Toyotomi / Hiroie Kikkawa / Hideie Ukita / Tadaoki Hosokawa	English dub
2002	Gundam Battle Assault 2	Trowa Barton	English dub
2003	Mobile Suit Gundam: Encounters in Space	Dimitri	English dub
2004	CSI: Dark Motives	Clayton Regis	
2004	Inuyasha: The Secret of the Cursed Mask	Miroku	English dub
2005	Ys: The Ark of Napishtim	Ur, Seblo, Lolo, Camara	English dub
2005	Inuyasha: Feudal Combat	Miroku	English dub
2005	Marvel Nemesis: Rise of the Imperfects	Human Torch / Johnny Storm	
2005	Devil Kings	Azure Dragon	English dub
2009	Dynasty Warriors: Gundam 2	Gyunei Guss	English dub
2011	Trinity: Souls of Zill O’ll	Xenetes	English dub
2011	Dynasty Warriors: Gundam 3	Trowa Barton	English dub
2017	Thimbleweed Park	Dave Miller, Chet Lockdown	
