= Michael Adamthwaite =

Canadian voice actor

- Occupation: Actor
- Years active: 1995–present
- Website: Official website

Michael Adamthwaite is a Canadian actor. He is credited with providing the voice for many characters in various anime series. He is also known for portraying the Jaffa Herak in the science fiction television series Stargate SG-1. He is best known as the voice of Jay in the Cartoon Network show Lego Ninjago: Masters of Spinjitzu.

== Filmography ==
=== Animation ===
- Dinotrux — Downdraft the Dozeratops
- Dragons II: The Metal Ages — Prince Dev
- Fantastic Four: World's Greatest Heroes — Namor
- Firehouse Tales — Petrol
- Hulk Versus — Balder
- Realms of Creation - Lord Xander
- Mega Man: Fully Charged — Sergeant Breaker Night/Lord Obsidian, Duane, Mary Flair
- Iron Man: Armored Adventures — Justin Hammer/Titanium Man, J.A.R.V.I.S.
- Nerds and Monsters — Durn
- Next Avengers: Heroes of Tomorrow — Thor
- Ninjago — Jay, Mezmo, Fang-Suei, Mailman, Raggmunk
- Superbook — Pearce, Esau
- Supernoobs — Jock Jockerson, Zenblock, Mr. Wertz, Radio Announcer
- X-Men: Evolution — Colossus

=== Live action roles ===
- The Sandlot: Heading Home — Dodger Pitcher
- Final Destination 5 — Line Cook
- Big Time Movie — Rikard
- Horns (2013) — Eric Hannity
- Psych — Rory
- Smallville — Ricky (episode: "Crossfire")
- Stargate SG-1 — Herak
- Timeless — Wes Gilliam
- The Twilight Saga: New Moon — Chet
- Warcraft — Magni Bronzebeard
- Walking Tall (2004) — Burke
- The Hollow (2015) — Eddy
- The BFG (2016) — Butcher Boy (voice and motion-capture)
- War for the Planet of the Apes (2017) — Luca (motion-capture)
- In the Name of the King: Two Worlds — Thane
- Maximum Conviction (2012) — Collins
- Fast Layne — Clint Riggins
- Supernatural — Security Guard Bill
- Dirk Gently's Holistic Detective Agency — Zed
- Resident Alien — Howard Wright

== Dubbing roles ==
=== Animation ===
- Black Lagoon: The Second Barrage — Ginji Matsuzaki
- Boys Over Flowers — Tsukasa Domyoji
- Death Note — Raye Penber, Anthony Rester
- Dinosaur Train — Jess the Hesperornis, Reggie the Raptorex
- Dragon Drive — Hikaru Himuro
- Dynasty Warriors: Gundam 2 — Seabook Arno, Kyoji Kasshu
- Dynasty Warriors: Gundam 3 — Seabook Arno, Kyoji Kasshu, Ribbons Almark
- Future Boy Conan — Dongoro
- Ghost in the Shell: Stand Alone Complex The Laughing Man OVA — The Laughing Man
- Gintama° — Toshiro Hijikata
- Hikaru no Go — Seiji Ogata
- Infinite Ryvius — Fu Namuchai
- Inuyasha: The Final Act — Byakuya, Ginka, Naohi, Wolf demon graveyard protector
- Kingdom series — Chang Wen Jun
- Kiznaiver — Kazunao Yamada
- Kurozuka — Arashiyama
- Master Keaton — Heinrich
- MegaMan NT Warrior — Mr. Hikari
- Mobile Suit Gundam SEED — Yzak Joule
- Mobile Suit Gundam SEED Special Edition — Yzak Joule
- Mobile Suit Gundam SEED Destiny — Yzak Joule
- Mobile Suit Gundam 00 — Narrator, Ribbons Almark, Emilio
- Nana — Kyosuke Takakura
- Project ARMS — Cliff Gilbert
- Ronin Warriors — Mukala
- Sinbad - Captain Razzak
- Star Ocean EX — Chin
- Sword of the Stranger — No Name
- The Little Prince — Muche-Muche (The Planet of the Grelon) Antoine, the astronomer (The Star Snatcher's Planet)
- The Story of Saiunkoku — Shuei Ran, Courtier 1, High Government Official 1
- Tokyo Underground — Seki
- Transformers: Cybertron — Lugnutz
- Trouble Chocolate — Truffle
- Zoids Wild — Quade
- Zeke's Pad — Ezekial "Zeke" Palmer

=== Live-action ===
- Death Note — Raye Iwamatsu (Raye Penber)

=== Video games ===
- Dynasty Warriors Gundam 2 — Kyoji Kasshu, Seabook Arno
- Dynasty Warriors Gundam 3 — Kyoji Kasshu, Ribbons Almark, Seabook Arno
- Mobile Suit Gundam: Encounters in Space — Yuu Kajima
- Mobile Suit Gundam SEED: Never Ending Tomorrow — Yzak Joule
- Lost Judgment — High Court Judge
- Zoids Wild: Blast Unleashed — Quade, Deleters
- Resident Evil 4 Remake — The Merchant
