= List of Ninjago characters =

The following is a list of fictional characters from the Danish-Canadian animated television series Ninjago and its sequel, which were produced by The Lego Group. The series features a large ensemble cast of recurring characters. The list includes the main protagonists, major and minor villains and other supporting characters that have appeared within the Ninjago universe. The list is mainly organised into groups of fictional beings based on the chronological order of season release.

Ninjago focuses on a group of six teenage ninja, named Lloyd Garmadon, Kai, Cole, Jay, Zane and Nya, and their wise sensei, Master Wu. The ninja team's purpose is to battle against the forces of evil, including Wu's older brother and Lloyd's father, Lord Garmadon. The series is mainly set on Ninjago Island, centred around the large metropolis of Ninjago City, which is inhabited by a large cast of supporting characters and villains, such as Nindroid armies and ghosts. The series was created to coincide with the Lego Ninjago line of construction toys, which is based on the characters and events of the series. It was created by Michael Hegner and Tommy Andreasen, two Danish film producers.

== Main ==
Clockwise from far-left: Kai, Cole, Nya, Lloyd, Jay, Wu and Zane

=== Lloyd Garmadon ===
Lloyd Montgomery Garmadon (voiced by Jillian Michaels in Seasons 1–7 and Sam Vincent from Season 8 onward) is the Green/Golden Ninja and Elemental Master of Energy (later known as Life), which grants him the ability to manipulate The Four Elements of Creation. He is the current leader of the Ninja Team, son of Lord Garmadon and Misako, nephew of Master Wu and grandson of the First Spinjitzu Master. He frequently wields either a katana or dual katanas. Lloyd made his debut in the first season as a mischievous child wanting to be an evil warlord like his father, which results in childish schemes that are foiled by the original four ninjas. Lloyd is reformed by the ninjas and his uncle Master Wu, before discovering his destiny as the prophesied Green Ninja. While initially mischievous and naive, Lloyd is tempered by experience over the course of the series to become a mature, wise and skilled ninja. Although he is depicted as the youngest member of the team, Lloyd's character has been developed to be its natural leader. His love interest is Harumi and Akita as shown in dragons rising season 4.

=== Kai ===
Kai (voiced by Vincent Tong) is the Red Ninja and Elemental Master of Fire. Like Lloyd, he frequently wields either a katana or dual katanas. His elemental power grants him limited pyrokinesis and extreme heat resistance. Kai is fiercely loyal to his friends and family, often willing to do anything to ensure their safety. He often acts on emotion instead of reason, causing him to be hotheaded, cocky, and rash, but he has a strong sense of responsibility towards his friends. Kai is the older brother of Nya and son of Ray and Maya. His love interest is Skylor Chen. Kai is one of the original series' main protogonists, alongside Lloyd.

=== Jay Walker ===
Jay Walker (né Gordon) (voiced by Michael Adamthwaite) is the Blue Ninja and Elemental Master of Lightning. He frequently wields nunchucks and more recently, a kusarigama. His elemental power grants him limited electricity manipulation. He is also a skilled mechanic and is technologically savvy. Jay is inventive and quick-witted, often using comedy to alleviate stressful situations. He is easily excitable and prone to freaking out when in crises but like the other ninja is intensely loyal to his friends, especially his Yang/girlfriend Nya. He is the son of Cliff Gordon and his wife Libber, the previous Elemental Master of Lightning, but was adopted and raised by Ed and Edna Walker. After the Merge, Jay found himself in the Administration, where he became the manager of realm reassignment. The Merge also caused him to lose his memories of who he was and his travels with the other ninja. A year after Imperium was liberated, Jay left the Administration and was recruited by Ras, only to be cast away following his loss to Nya in the Tournament of Sources. After this loss, he became a bounty hunter known as 'Rogue', taking a deal from Zeatrix to hunt Ras down. Though he left them later on, he eventually returned and rejoined the team. He ultimately regained his memories over time, allowing him to fully rejoin the ninja.

=== Zane ===
Zane (voiced by Brent Miller) is the White/Titanium Ninja and Elemental Master of Ice. He frequently wields three-pointed shurikens and, for the eight, ninth and tenth season, a bow and arrow. His elemental power of Ice grants him limited cryokinesis. Zane is intelligent and calculating, often providing intel to the ninja when required. Initially, he lacks normal social skills, such as a sense of humor, but it is later revealed that Zane is secretly an android (or "Nindroid"), a fact unknown to both the ninja and Zane himself. Though he is still logical and matter-of-fact by nature, his brotherhood with the other ninja has enabled him to develop more human characteristics. He is the son/creation of Dr. Julien. His love interest is P.I.X.A.L.

=== Cole ===
Cole (voiced by Kirby Morrow from the pilot episodes–Season 14, Andrew Francis from Season 15 onward) is the grounded and solid Black Ninja and Elemental Master of Earth. He frequently wields a scythe and, in recent seasons, a war hammer. His elemental power grants him limited earth manipulation and super strength. The original leader of the Ninja Team before Lloyd, he is loyal to his friends and family and has a special love for food, especially cake. He is the son of Lou, a member of a barbershop quartet, and Lilly, the previous Elemental Master of Earth, who was a brave warrior and later died due to an illness when Cole was still a child.

=== Nya ===
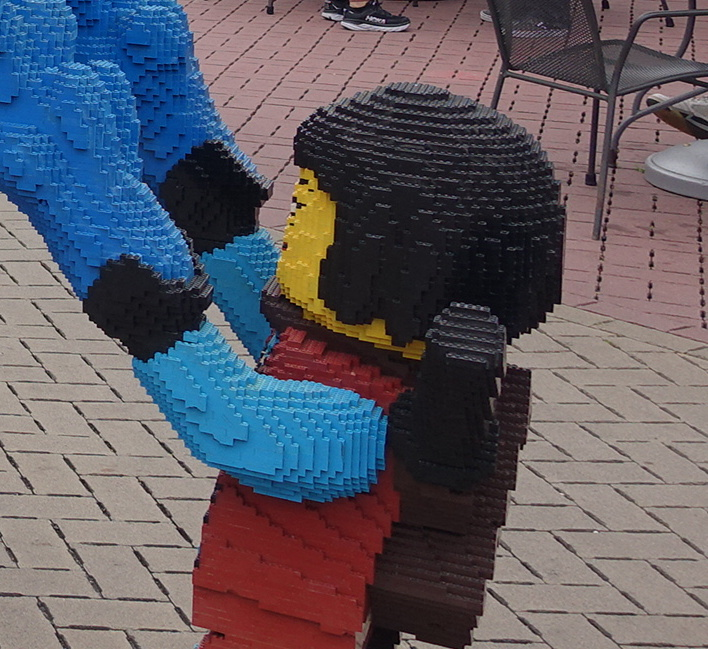
Sculpture of Nya at Legoland California displaying her hydrokinetic powers.

Nya (voiced by Kelly Metzger) is the Light Blue Ninja, Elemental Master of Water and the original Samurai X. She frequently wields a spear. In early seasons she wears red as Samurai X. Since the release of The Lego Ninjago Movie, she has primarily been depicted in gunmetal grey. Her elemental power grants her limited hydrokinesis. Although she is not an original member of the ninja team, Nya joins when her skills as the Light Blue Ninja and Elemental Master of Water are needed to defeat the ghosts and the Preeminent in Season 5. Tough and determined, she refuses to let anyone tell her what to do. Though she can sometimes be stubborn, Nya cares about her friends and family, often making the mature decisions in the group and serving as emotional support. As a skilled mechanic, she often constructs vehicles for the other ninja. Nya is Kai's younger sister, girlfriend/Yang of Jay and the daughter of Ray and Maya.

=== Arin Nived ===
Arin Nived (voiced by Deven Mack) is a ninja and one of Lloyd's protégés. As a kid, he idolized the Ninja with desire to become one. He lost his parents after The Merge and somehow managed to teach himself Spinjitzu, an ability thought impossible, which eventually became a technique inadvertently invented called Object Spinjitzu when he discovered he can transfer Spinjitzu to inanimate objects. During the Tournament of the Sources, he began to fall out with the Ninja, eventually leaving them and joining Lord Ras to find his parents.later after Lord Ras tries to kill Sora to create a source dragon icon he leaves him and returns to the ninja.

=== Sora ===
Sora (born Ana) (voiced by Sabrina Pitre) is the Elemental Master of Technology, one of Lloyd's protégés, and a technopathic engineer, originally from Imperium. She gained recognition for creating a hard light hologram projection device called Photac. She defected from Imperium when she found out how cruelly they treated dragons, leading to her parents and classmates shunning her. After the Merge, she changed her name after the dragon that was powering Imperium, befriended Arin and lived in the Crossroads, becoming a mech racer. Her powers were originally enhanced by baby dragon Riyu, until she achieved her True Potential, declaring the Ninja her true family and disowning her parents. She later won the Tournament of Sources.

=== Wyldfyre ===
Wyldfyre (voiced by Kazumi Evans) is the wild Elemental Master of Heat who was raised by a dragon named Heatwave and an unnamed Caregiver Bot. She joins with the Ninjas after Lloyd rescued her and her 'family' from Imperium. While helping the Ninja find the Dragon Cores, Wyldfyre, despite some heated differences, eventually became Kai's protégé. During the Tournament of the Sources, Wyldfyre falls in love with Roby.

=== P.I.X.A.L. ===
P.I.X.A.L. (Primary Interactive X-ternal Assistant Life-form) (voiced by Jennifer Hayward) is a female nindroid who was originally an assistant to her creator/father Cyrus Borg. She joins the ninja team after being influenced by her fellow nindroid Zane. She is disassembled in Season 4, but is then uploaded into Zane's system as an artificial intelligence. In Season 7, she secretly rebuilds herself and becomes the new Samurai X. She often provides technical support to the ninja while serving as Zane's love interest.

=== Sensei Wu ===
Sensei/Master Wu (voiced by Paul Dobson, Caleb Skeris as a baby, Madyx Whiteway as a child) is the wise and ancient master of the ninjas who frequently wields his father's staff. He is Lloyd's uncle, younger son of the First Spinjitzu Master and brother to Garmadon. Because of his Oni heritage, Wu has lived for thousands of years. Wu was one of the many allies of the ninja that went missing after the Merge, having taken form of a spirit named Sprite, and claiming to have caused the Merge.

=== Lord Garmadon ===
Lord/Sensei/Emperor Garmadon (voiced by Mark Oliver, Kai Emmett as a child in season 9, Dean Petriw as a child in season 11) is Lloyd's father, Wu's older brother, Misako's husband, and the older son of the First Spinjitzu Master. Due to his Oni heritage, he has lived for thousands of years. Garmadon is the main antagonist for the pilot episodes, secondary antagonist of Season 1, and main antagonist of Season 2. He is cleansed of evil after the Overlord's defeat at the end of the second season, and in Season 3 he becomes a sensei to the ninja. In Season 4, he is sacrificed to the Cursed Realm, and dies in Season 5 when the Cursed Realm is destroyed. He is resurrected as Emperor Garmadon in Season 8, becoming a main antagonist for Season 9 before being defeated by Lloyd and imprisoned in Kryptarium Prison. In Season 10, he is released to help the Ninja defeat the Oni, after which he walks free. In Season 15, it is revealed he went into hiding at Vinny Folson's apartment before coming out to help the Ninja fight the resurrected Overlord. He attempts to help Lloyd to unlock his Oni powers, but ultimately fails. See Ninjago: March of the Oni for his appearance.

== Family members ==
- Misako (voiced by Kathleen Barr) is Garmadon's wife and Lloyd's mother who works as an archaeologist. She was introduced in Season 2 and since then has been a recurring character and one of the most loyal allies of the ninja.
- The First Spinjitzu Master (voiced by Jim Conrad) is the legendary creator of Spinjitzu, father of Wu and Garmadon, and grandfather of Lloyd. Originally from the Realm of Oni and Dragons, he created the realm of Ninjago and fought the Overlord, trapping him on the Dark Island. He died long before the start of the series.
- Dr. Julien (voiced by Mark Oliver) is an inventor and the creator/father of Zane. Dr. Julien is presumed dead until Season 2 when he reveals that Samukai had revitalized and imprisoned him. He briefly travels with the Ninja after they find him at the Lighthouse Prison, he dies sometime between Seasons 2 and 3.
- Ed Walker (voiced by Colin Murdock) is the adoptive father of Jay and the husband of Edna Walker, as well as the co-owner of Ed & Edna's Scrap N Junk.
- Edna Walker (voiced by Jillian Michaels) is the adoptive mother of Jay and the wife of Ed Walker, as well as the co-owner of Ed & Edna's Scrap N Junk.
- Lou (voiced by Kirby Morrow) is Cole's father, Lilly's husband, and notable member of the Royal Blacksmiths, a famous song and dance troupe.
- Lilly (voiced by Erin Mathews) is Cole's mother and the former Elemental Master of Earth. She died before the start of the series, but in Season 13 is revealed to have been a great warrior who freed Shintaro Mountain from evil by defeating Grief-Bringer. In doing so, she became a legend to the Geckles and Munce, who call her Gilly and Milly respectively.
- Ray (voiced by Vincent Tong) is Kai and Nya's father, Maya's husband and the former Elemental Master of Fire. He previously fought alongside his wife with Masters Wu and Garmadon as part of the First Elemental Alliance during the First Serpentine War. He is a skilled blacksmith. He and his wife returned in Seabound, where he stayed at the monastery to assist Wu in studying the difference between current and former Masters of Fire, alongside Kai.
- Maya (voiced by Jillian Michaels) is Kai and Nya's mother, Ray's wife and the former Elemental Master of Water. She previously fought alongside her husband with Masters Wu and Garmadon as part of the First Elemental Alliance during the First Serpentine War. She and her husband returned in Seabound to help Nya regain control of her powers, until it was discovered Kalmaar was responsible for disrupting them while trying to resurrect Wojira.

== Recurring allies ==
- Dareth (voiced by Alan Marriott) is the self-proclaimed "Brown Ninja", and Grand Sensei of Dareth's Mojo Dojo. Introduced in Season 2, he is a frequent ally of the Ninja both by choice and coincidence. In "Ninjago Legacy of the Green Ninja" he plays a vital role in the defeat of the Overlord (Second only to Lloyd, and The First Spinjitzu Master). In Season 15, he becomes the Ninjas' lawyer.
- Mystake (voiced by Mackenzie Gray Seasons 1–2, Mark Oliver Season 4, Tabitha St. Germain Seasons 8–9) is a grouchy but wise old lady who owns a tea shop that sells rare tea with magical properties. In Season 9, she is revealed to be a shapeshifter and an Oni in disguise. In the same season, it is implied that she was killed by Garmadon.
- Cyrus Borg (voiced by Lee Tockar) is a tech genius, inventor and head of Borg Industries. He is the creator/father of P.I.X.A.L. and has invented many cutting-edge electronic tools and gadgets. He first sought out the Ninja in Season 3 after the Digital Overlord overtook his computer systems. Throughout the series he has built a variety of tools, security systems, machines, and vehicles to assist the Ninja.
- Ronin Kognito (voiced by Brian Dobson) is a thief, mercenary and bounty hunter, motivated by self-interest who will sometimes assist the Ninja if it suits his needs. However, he will easily double cross them if he is paid well. He makes his first appearance in the show in Season 5. In The Island, he serves as the true main antagonist, using a fake Wojira boat to trick the Keeper into giving them their gold. He and his henchmen are defeated by the Ninja and sentenced to imprisonment on the Keepers' island. In Season 15, Ronin breaks out of Kryptarium Prison to help the Ninja defeat the Overlord, effectively redeeming himself.
- Police Commissioner (voiced by Michael Donovan) is the head of the Ninjago Police. He was originally introduced in Season 6 as an antagonist who pursued the Ninja when they were framed for committing various crimes by Nadakhan. Since then, he has assisted them both personally and with the full backing of the police force.
- Nelson (voiced by David Reynolds) is the honorary "Purple Ninja". In Season 6, he uses a wheelchair due to breaking his legs and is made a ninja for a day for the Grant-a-Wish Foundation. In Season 11, he becomes a paperboy and warns Wu and P.I.X.A.L. of the Ninja's predicament in the flaming pyramid. In Season 15, he joins a resistance made of paperboys to help the Ninja fight the Overlord.
- Antonia (voiced by Brynna Drummond) is a papergirl who mentors Nelson. In Season 14, she initially decides to quit being a papergirl and work at a place called "Dairy Dragon" but after she saves Kai from drowning in a canal in Ninjago City, she decides to stay in her job as a papergirl. In Season 15, she joins a resistance of paperboys to help the Ninja fight the Overlord.
- Clutch Powers (voiced by Ian James Corlett) is an adventurer and a suspended member of the Explorers Club. In Season 11, he helps the ninja to explore the pyramid that entombs Aspheera. He appears again in Season 12, The Island, Season 14 and Season 15. The character originally appeared in Lego: The Adventures of Clutch Powers.
- Alfonzo Frohicky (voiced by Andrew McNee) is an anthropomorphic frog from the Crossroads. He was in charge of registering racers for the Mech Master 5000 and hosted a pie contest in the Crossroads Carnival. Lloyd brings him in on Arin and Sora's insistence as Assistant Keeper of the Monastery.

== Skulkin ==
The Skulkin are an army of skeletons that inhabit the Underworld and are the main antagonists of the pilot episodes. After becoming their leader, Garmadon sends Samukai and the Skulkin to Ninjago to find the Four Golden Weapons of Spinjitzu. In Rise of the Snakes, Garmadon again leads the Skulkin to help the ninja to obtain the Fang Blades from the Serpentine and save Lloyd.

- Samukai (voiced by Michael Kopsa) is a secondary antagonist of the Pilot Episodes and the four-armed Skulkin ruler of the Underworld until Lord Garmadon defeats him in single combat and takes command. He leads the attacks on Ninjago to retrieve the four Golden Weapons but attempts to betray Lord Garmadon by keeping the weapons for himself and is destroyed. He makes recurring appearances in later seasons.
- Kruncha (voiced by Brian Drummond) is a brutish Skulkin general who serves under Samukai and takes part in the raids to retrieve the Golden Weapons. After the Skulkin's defeat, he finds himself roaming Ninjago and taking odd jobs with Nuckal.
- Nuckal (voiced by Brian Drummond) is an unhinged Skulkin general. He serves under Samukai and takes part in the raids to retrieve the Golden Weapons. After the Skulkin's defeat, he finds himself roaming Ninjago and taking odd jobs with Kruncha.
- Wyplash (voiced by Michael Dobson) is a paranoid Skulkin general. Unlike Samukai, Kruncha and Nuckal, he does not take part in the Golden Weapon raids. After the Skulkin are defeated, he attempts to ambush Nya but is soundly beaten.

== Serpentine ==
The Serpentine are an ancient race of humanoid serpents who were once at war with humanity. They serve as the main antagonists of the first season Rise of the Snakes. They consist of five tribes, the Anacondrai, Hypnobrai, Fangpyre, Constrictai and Venomari. Released from their tombs by Lloyd Garmadon, the Serpentine attempt to conquer Ninjago several times under the leadership of Pythor, Lord Garmadon, and Skales. They reappear in subsequent seasons.

- The Great Devourer is a giant snake and the overarching antagonist of Season 1. It has the ability to increase its size by consuming anything in its path and was responsible for turning Garmadon evil when he was bitten as a child and corrupted by its venom. The snake is released by Pythor to exact revenge on the people of Ninjago but is destroyed by Garmadon using the Golden Weapons. It is later revealed the Great Devourer is female, having lain eggs that would give birth to the Vermillion race and in Dragon Form it is revealed the Great Devourer was possessed and corrupted by the Overlord.
- Pythor P. Chumsworth (voiced by Michael Dobson) is a recurring antagonist who first appears as the main antagonist of Season 1 and is the general and last remaining member of the Anacondrai Tribe. He pretends to befriend Lloyd, becomes the Snake King and releases the Great Devourer. He reappears in Season 3 as one of two secondary antagonists and an ally of the Overlord, but is shrunk with a pill intended for the Overlord. In Season 4 he helps the ninja to defeat Master Chen. As a reward for his helpfulness, he is increased back to normal size. He appears in Ninjago: Day of the Departed, and finally in Crystallized, he is recruited by Harumi to join the Council of the Crystal King only to be shocked unconscious by Jay after the latter reclaims his weapons.
- General Arcturus (voiced by Scott McNeil) is a general and leader of the Anacondrai Tribe and supreme leader of the Serpentine during the First Serpentine War. He and the other Anacondrai generals are banished to the Cursed Realm after being defeated by the Elemental Alliance. The ghosts of the Anacondrai generals are freed in Season 4 in order to defeat Chen's Anacondrai Army.
- Skales (voiced by Ian James Corlett) is a recurring antagonist, leader of the Hypnobrai Tribe and current Snake King of the Serpentine who first appeared in Season 1. After being repeatedly defeated by the ninja, he and the Serpentine find themselves trapped underground by the Stone Army in Season 2 but then take an oath of pacifism and began to live peacefully alongside the other inhabitants of Ninjago. Skales is often seen helping the Ninja.
- Slithraa (voiced by John Novak) is the former leader and general of the Hypnobrai Tribe. After accidentally hypnotizing himself, he becomes a servant to Lloyd Garmadon and leads his tribe in accomplishing the childish schemes of the young boy. Frustrated by being ordered around, Skales sees an opportunity to rise in power. After another failed scheme, Slithraa is challenged by Skales to a match in the Slither Pit for the right to lead the Hypnobrai. Slithraa is subsequently defeated by Skales and is demoted to a warrior.
- Fangtom (voiced by Mackenzie Gray) is the two-headed leader and general of the Fangpyre Tribe. He is an old friend of Skales and, like all the Fangpyre, has a red and white coloration with the ability to turn anyone or anything into a snake by injecting them with his poisonous venom.
- Skalidor (voiced by Michael Dobson) is the powerful leader and general of the Constrictai Tribe. Like all Constrictai, Skalidor has black and orange coloration and the ability to burrow underground while also possessing abundant strength.
- Acidicus (voiced by Paul Dobson) is the intelligent leader and general of the Venomari Tribe. Like all Venomari, Acidicus has green coloration and the ability to spit venom at his foes which causes fear inducing hallucinations. It is also shown in Season 11 that he is the Serpentine's librarian, aiding the ninja in telling the story (even if the story was wrong) of Aspheera and the Treacherous Deceiver

== Stone Army ==
The Overlord and his armies are the main antagonists of Seasons 2, 3, and 15. In the second season Legacy of the Green Ninja the Overlord possesses Garmadon with the aim of conquering Ninjago. He uses Garmadon to raise a Stone Army, led by General Kozu.

- The Overlord (voiced by Scott McNeil) is an entity of pure evil and the manifestation of darkness in Ninjago. Before the start of the series he fights the First Spinjitzu Master, but is defeated and trapped on the Dark Island. In Season 2, he possesses Garmadon and transforms into a huge dragon. Lloyd defeats the Overlord in the Season 2 finale by unlocking his Golden Power. The Overlord returns in Season 3 as the Digital Overlord, a computer virus that takes over the technology of New Ninjago City. He steals Lloyd's Golden Power, allowing him to become the Golden Master. After attacking New Ninjago City, he is defeated by Zane's sacrifice in the Season 3 finale. He appears resurrected in Crystalized as the Crystal King where he plans to corrupt Ninjago with crystals to destroy the balance between good and evil, corrupt the ninja and elements of creation. He is finally eventually defeated for good by Lloyd with the help of a four-headed golden dragon formed by the Ninja by combining the Golden Weapons to unleash their elemental powers to prevent the Overlord from corrupting the ninja and elements of creation.
- General Kozu (voiced by Paul Dobson) is a secondary antagonist of Season 2 and the four-armed general of the Overlord's Stone Army. He reappears in Day of the Departed.

== Nindroids ==
In the third season Rebooted the Overlord returns as the Digital Overlord, a computer virus that creates an army of Nindroids (androids), led by General Cryptor.

- General Cryptor (voiced by Richard Newman) is a secondary antagonist of Season 3 and the general of the Overlord's Nindroid army who aims to stop the ninja from defeating the Overlord. He reappears in Day of the Departed. He then appears once again in Ninjago Dragons Rising season 4 part 2.
- Min-Droid (voiced by Michael Adamthwaite) is a member of the Nindroid army who is shorter than the other nindroids due to the production line he was on running out of metal before he was fully completed, as he was the last off the line. He was given his name, which was meant to be an insult against his size, by Cryptor.

== Elemental Masters ==
The Elemental Masters are the guardians of the First Spinjitzu Master who have mastered the elements in Ninjago. Their descendants appear in the fourth season Tournament of Elements and help the ninja to fight against Master Chen's Anacondrai army. They reappear in the ninth season to form a resistance and help Lloyd save Ninjago City from Emperor Garmadon. A new generation of Elemental Masters appear in the second season of Ninjago: Dragons Rising.

- Skylor Chen (voiced by Heather Doerksen) is the Elemental Master of Amber and Master Chen's daughter. She has the ability to temporarily absorb and use other elemental powers. In Season 4 she operates as a spy for her father in the Tournament of Elements and is tasked with disrupting the Ninja and their alliance. Though she initially helps her father to steal the elemental powers of the other masters, Kai convinces her to switch sides and she ultimately betrays Chen and helps to return the stolen elemental powers. It is revealed by Chen that Skylor inherited the power of Amber from her mother. She has reappeared as an ally of the Ninja in subsequent seasons and is Kai's girlfriend.
- Karlof (voiced by Scott McNeil) is the Elemental Master of Metal and engineer from Metalonia. He has the ability to turn his entire body into metal and grow slightly in size.
- Griffin Turner (voiced by Doron Bell) is the Elemental Master of Speed. He has the ability to move at super speed.
- Shade (voiced by Andrew Francis) is the previous Elemental Master of Shadow. He has the ability to disappear and move in shadows.
- Neuro (voiced by Paul Dobson) is the Elemental Master of Mind. He has the ability to read minds and manipulate thoughts.
- Paleman (voiced by Kirby Morrow in Ninjago, Ian Hanlin in Dragons Rising) (also known as Mr. Pale) is the Elemental Master of Light. He has the ability to generate light and turn invisible.
- Tox (voiced by Ian James Corlett in Season 4, Maggie Blue O'Hara in Season 9, Tabitha St. Germain in Dragons Rising Season 2) is the Elemental Master of Poison who is capable of producing toxic clouds.
- Jacob Pevsner (voiced by Paul Dobson) is the blind Elemental Master of Sound who wields a guitar in combat and has the ability to manipulate sounds.
- Bolobo (voiced by Michael Adamthwaite) is the previous Elemental Master of Nature. He has the ability to control plants.
- Chamille (voiced by Maryke Hendrikse) is the Elemental Master of Form. She has the ability to shapeshift.
- Ash (voiced by Brent Miller) is the previous Elemental Master of Smoke. He has the ability to create smokescreens and transform into smoke.
- Gravis (voiced by Kirby Morrow in episode 37, Mark Oliver in all other appearances) is the Elemental Master of Gravity. He has the ability to levitate and alter gravity.
- Frak (voiced by David A. Kaye) is a Serpentine who is Arin's childhood best friend and the Elemental Master of Quake. He has the ability to cause vibrations.
- Obscuria is the current Elemental Master of Shadow.
- Kizzy is the Elemental Master of Balance and a Water-Tide from the Azure Reef. She has the ability to balance herself on parkours.
- Zur (voiced by Paul Dobson) is the Elemental Master of Reflex and a Devonian. He has the ability to react quickly to attacks and avoid them.

== Anacondrai Cultists ==
Master Chen and his Anacondrai cultists serve as the main antagonists of the fourth season Tournament of Elements. When the ninja are invited to the Tournament of Elements they are forced to compete against the other Elemental Masters. Chen secretly uses the tournament to steal their powers in order to transform his followers into Anacondrai warriors.

- Master Chen (voiced by Ian James Corlett) is the main antagonist of Season 4, leader of the Anacondrai cultists, Treacherous Deceiver and the father of Skylor. Before the series, he was exiled to an island after allying himself with the Serpentine and betraying humanity during the first Serpentine War although he is the one who is responsible for deceiving manipulating and tricking both sides. He attempts to steal the powers of the Elemental Masters to transform him and his followers into Anacondrai warriors to conquer Ninjago but is defeated and banished to the Cursed Realm. He makes a cameo appearance in the fifth season Possession as a prisoner in the Cursed Realm, and reappears in Day of the Departed.
- Clouse (voiced by Scott McNeil) is a recurring secondary antagonist who appears in Seasons 4, 5 and 6. He is a dark sorcerer and Chen's second-in-command. In the lore of the show, he trained with Lord Garmadon under Master Chen before the First Serpentine War. He is sent to the Cursed Realm after being defeated by Garmadon in Season 4, but escapes the Preeminent before its destruction in Season 5. After the reversal of Jay's wish in the finale of Season 6, he fails to release Nadakhan, ensuring that the events never take place In the Dark Island Trilogy graphic novels, he is banished to the Underworld after trying to corrupt the Temple of Light.
- Eyezor (voiced by Michael Donovan) is a smug one-eyed general of Chen's Anacondrai warriors. He oversees the transportation of goods from the noodle factory to Chen's noodle house.
- Zugu (voiced by Brian Dobson) is a clumsy general of Chen's Anacondrai Cultists. He oversees the production of goods in Chen's noodle factory as well as the prisoners who were forced to make them.
- Kapau(voiced by Alessandro Juliani) is a comical Anacondrai warrior who is never seen without Chope.
- Chope (voiced by Ian Hanlin) is a comical Anacondrai warrior who is never seen without Kapow

== Ghosts ==
The ghosts are a faction of cursed spirits that are the main antagonists of the fifth season Possession. They are summoned by Morro from the Cursed Realm. Ghosts have the ability to transform and possess objects and organisms. They are immune to most forms of physical attack, but are vulnerable to water.

- The Preeminent is the overarching antagonist of Season 5 and the embodiment of the Cursed Realm who resembles a massive eyeball with tentacles. She is the master of Morro and his ghost warriors. In Season 5, she successfully crosses into Ninjago but is defeated when Nya unlocks her True Potential and drowns her with a huge wave. In Season 11, she reappears from the Departed Realm after Wu tries to open a portal to the Never-Realm, but is defeated by P.I.X.A.L and sent back.
- Morro (voiced by Michael Dobson in episode 44, Andrew Francis from 45 onward) is the main antagonist of Season 5, the Elemental Master of Wind, and leader of the Ghost Army. In the lore of the series, he was a former student of Master Wu who was led to believe that he would become the legendary Green Ninja. When the Golden Weapons proved otherwise, he left in a rage. He was eventually banished to the Cursed Realm and returned as a ghost. In Season 5, Morro possesses Lloyd and plans to release the Preeminent but is killed in the season finale while being dragged into water by the Preeminent. He reappears in Day of the Departed and helps the ninja by informing them of Master Yang's plan before returning to the Departed Realm.
- Bansha (voiced by Kathleen Barr) is a ghost and dark sorceress who wields a double-bladed dagger. She has telepathic powers, the ability to create sonic screams, and can possess targets from a distance.
- Soul Archer (voiced by Brian Dobson) is a ghost warrior who wields a bow and arrows that can turn its targets into ghosts.
- Wrayth (voiced by Michael Adamthwaite) is a ghost warrior who wields a chained whip that can turn its targets into ghosts. He rides a possessed bike.
- Ghoultar (voiced by Paul Dobson) is a ghost warrior who wields a scythe. He is often distracted by food.
- Sensei/Master Kodokuna Yang (voiced by Michael Donovan) is a recurring antagonist of Season 5 and the main antagonist of Day of the Departed. He is the creator of Airjitzu and the guardian of the Temple of Airjitzu. Before the series, he accidentally turned himself and his students into ghosts after arrogantly attempting to use the Yin Blade to gain immortality. In Season 5 he attempts to trap the Ninja inside the Temple of Airjitzu. He also makes a cameo appearance in the sixth season Skybound. In Day of the Departed he fights Cole to reach the Rift of Return in order to become human again.

== Cloud Kingdom inhabitants ==
The Cloud Kingdom is a realm where the monks write people's destinies.

- Fenwick (voiced by Paul Dobson) is the former Master Writer who double-crosses the Ninja and helps Morro find the Sword of Sanctuary.
- Nobu (voiced by Michael Adamthwaite) is a monk in charge of the Ninja's destiny. He alters Fenwick's to make the realm's pet, Nimbus, turn against him to protect the Ninja.
- Suetonius (voiced by Ian Hanlin) is the current Master Writer.
- Euphrasia (voiced by Bethany Brown) is a monk and the current Elemental Master of Wind. When she exposed her powers to save the Cloud Kingdom, her fear of banishment was reprieved when it was discovered the Merge defied destiny.
- Marcus (voiced by Aidan Drummond) is a monk.

== Sky Pirates ==
The Sky Pirates' Jolly Roger flag

The Sky Pirates are a motley crew of renegades who are the main antagonists of the sixth season Skybound. Before the series the Sky Pirates were scattered across the Sixteen Realms but are freed by Nadakhan in Season 6 using the Realm Crystal.

- Nadakhan (voiced by Scott McNeil) is the main antagonist of Season 6, the Djinn leader of the Sky Pirates and captain of Misfortune's Keep. He has the ability to grant three wishes to anyone within earshot and is the prince of the Kingdom of Djinjago and son of Khanjikhan. In Season 6, he plots to marry Nya in order to become all powerful with the ability of infinite wishes, but is defeated when Jay makes his final wish which reverses all of the events.
- Flintlocke (voiced by Paul Dobson) is Nadakhan's second-in-command who dresses like an old-time aviator and is known for never missing a shot.
- Dogshank (voiced by Nicole Oliver) is a massive female pirate who wears a helmet that conceals most of her head. According to Clancee, Dogshank used to be a regular girl, but she wished to Nadakhan that she could "stand out in a crowd," and thus was given this monstrous form.
- Doubloon (voiced by Vincent Tong) is a sinister looking general who resembles a Japanese demon in samurai armour. According to Clancee, he used to be a regular person, but Nadakhan tricked him into wishing for two faces.
- Monkey Wretch (voiced by Ian James Corlett) is a fierce mechanical monkey. Like Doubloon, he used to be a normal star mechanic, but got tricked into wishing for four arms, according to Clancee.
- Clancee (voiced by Ian James Corlett) a green Serpentine with a right peg leg who is constantly stuttering. He has never made even one wish in his entire life, until Nadakhan forced him to do so in Season 6.
- Squiffy (voiced by Michael Adamthwaite) is a human who wears a patch over his right eye. His real name is Landon.
- Bucko (voiced by Brian Dobson) is a human who wears a patch over his left eye. His real name is Colin.
- Cyren (voiced by Nicole Oliver) is the second female crew member of Nadakhan's crew after wishing to become a beautiful singer, only for the trickster djinn to make her voice mesmerizing to put anyone in a trance, she doesn't have a speaking role within the series.
- Khanjikhan (voiced by Michael Antonakos) is the King of the Kingdom of Djinjago and Nadakhan's father.

== Vermillion ==
The Hands of Time (Krux and Acronix) and their Vermillion Warriors are the main antagonists of the seventh season Hands of Time. Forty years before the beginning of Season 7, the Hands of Time are supposedly lost in the time vortex, but reappear at the start of the season. They breed an army of Vermillion to control time and conquer Ninjago. The Vermillion are the progeny of the Great Devourer and appear as humanoids formed from numerous snakes. They have the ability to reform immediately after being defeated in battle.

- Krux (voiced by Michael Daingerfield) is one of the two main antagonists (alongside his twin brother, Acronix) of Season 7 and one of the Elemental Masters of Time. He originally disguised himself as the museum curator Dr. Sander Saunders until his true identity was revealed in Season 7. He once had the ability to pause and reverse time.
- Acronix (voiced by Ian Hanlin) is one of the two main antagonists (alongside his twin brother, Krux) of Season 7 and one of the Elemental Masters of Time. He was trapped in a time vortex for 40 years until Season 7. He once had the ability to speed up and slow down time.
- Machia (voiced by Kathleen Barr) is the intelligent supreme commander of the Vermillion with Gorgon-like hair. Like all Vermillion, she is bred by Krux from the eggs of the Great Devourer. Like the other two commanders, Machia is able to control the Vermillion by communicating with their hive mind.
- Raggmunk (voiced by Michael Adamthwaite) is a commander of the Vermillion.
- Blunck (voiced by Brian Dobson) is a commander of the Vermillion.

== Sons of Garmadon ==
The Sons of Garmadon are a criminal biker gang in Ninjago City that are the antagonists of the eighth season Sons of Garmadon and the ninth season Hunted. Led by a mysterious leader known as “The Quiet One”, their aim is to resurrect Lord Garmadon in a purely evil form. In Season 8, they successfully acquire three Oni masks which are the keys to performing the ritual that can resurrect Garmadon from the Departed Realm. In Season 9, they terrorise and hunt down the citizens of Ninjago City under the rule of the newly resurrected Emperor Garmadon.

- Princess Harumi (voiced by Britt McKillip) (also known as the Jade Princess, "The Quiet One" and her nickname Rumi) is the main antagonist of Season 8 and a secondary antagonist of Season 9. She is the adopted daughter of the Emperor and Empress of Ninjago, after her parents died during the destruction of the Great Devourer in Season 1. This tragic event results in her swearing revenge on the Ninja and idolising Lord Garmadon for defeating the Great Devourer. In Season 8, she leads the Sons of Garmadon to resurrect Lord Garmadon, but is eventually revealed to be "The Quiet One". After Lord Garmadon conquers Ninjago in the finale, she reappears in Season 9 as his second-in-command. She perished in a collapsing building after helping a family to escape. She reappears as an avatar pitted against Lloyd in Season 12, but is destroyed. In Crystallized, Harumi is shown to have been revived by the Overlord, who has resurrected and returned as the Crystal King, and is revealed to be the Vengestone buyer mentioned in previous seasons. Upon learning the Overlord was indirectly responsible for the Great Devourer, she defects to help Lloyd defeat him.
- Killow (voiced by Garry Chalk) is a secondary antagonist of Seasons 8 and 9 and the hulking first general of the Sons of Garmadon (also known as "The Big Man"). He frequently wears the Oni Mask of Deception, which grants him the power of levitating objects close to him. He makes a cameo appearance in Season 11. In Crystallized, he breaks out of prison to help the Ninja fight the Overlord.
- Ultra Violet (voiced by Maggie Blue O'Hara in Seasons 8-9 and Sharon Alexander from Season 11-present) is a recurring secondary antagonist of Seasons 8 and 9 and the unhinged second general of the Sons of Garmadon. She frequently wears the Oni Mask of Hatred, sharing it with Harumi, which makes them both indestructible. She reappears in Season 11, where it is revealed that she despises Zane the most out of all of the Ninja. In Season 12, she escapes prison and joins forces with the Mechanic in helping Unagami. In Season 15, she breaks out of prison to help the Ninja fight the Overlord.
- Mr. E (voiced by Brent Miller) is a secondary antagonist of Seasons 8 and 9 and the silent and robotic third general of the Sons of Garmadon. He is revealed to be a nindroid like Zane and frequently wears the Oni Mask of Vengeance which grants him four arms. He is later destroyed by Emperor Garmadon for failing to capture Lloyd. He was later replaced by Mister F in Crystallized as a member of the Council of the Crystal King.
- Luke Cunningham (voiced by Michael Adamthwaite) is an avid biker, also known as the Man in the White Mask. In the first episode of Season 8, Luke and four other Sons of Garmadon members accompany Mr. E in the theft of the Oni Mask of Vengeance. He is arrested and later interrogated by Cole and Zane, where he accidentally reveals the location of the Sons of Garmadon.

== Dragon Hunters ==
The Dragon Hunters are the antagonists of the ninth season Hunted in the Realm of Oni and Dragons (the First Realm). Led by their authoritarian leader Iron Baron, they hunt dragons to exploit their elemental powers. They capture Wu and the ninja in Season 9, but eventually turn against Iron Baron and befriend the ninja.

- The Iron Baron (voiced by Brian Drummond) is one of the two main antagonists of Season 9 and the authoritarian leader of the Dragon Hunters in the Realm of Oni and Dragons. He seeks revenge on Firstbourne but is ultimately killed by her after attempting to wear the Dragon Armor.
- Faith (voiced by Kathleen Barr) (also known as Heavy Metal) is Iron Baron's second-in-command and original wielder of the Dragonbone Blade. She is the first Dragon Hunter to defect upon discovering Wu is the son of the First Spinjitzu Master, destined to find the Dragon Armor. Following Iron Baron's death, she takes over as the leader of the Dragon Hunters.
- Daddy No Legs (voiced by Ian James Corlett) is a Dragon Hunter who has no legs and uses a spider-leg apparatus to get around.
- Muzzle (voiced by Brent Miller) is the right-hand man to Daddy No Legs. He speaks in a language only the Dragon Hunters can understand.
- Jet Jack (voiced by Rhona Rees) is the former rival and current second-in-command of Heavy Metal. She is never without a jetpack.
- Chew Toy (voiced by Scott McNeil) is an overweight and mentally unstable Dragon Hunter.

== Oni ==
The Oni are a demonic race and the first evil to come into existence. Known as the "Bringers of Doom", they serve as the antagonists of tenth season March of the Oni. Thousands of years before the series they waged a never-ending war against the Dragons. While the Dragons had the power of creation, the Oni had the power of destruction. They once inhabited Oni land in the First Realm (the Realm of Oni and Dragons) but mysteriously disappear in order to conquer the Sixteen Realms. In Season 10 they enter Ninjago through the Realm Crystal and cover Ninjago City in darkness.

- The Omega (voiced by Zach LeBlanc) is the main antagonist of Season 10 and the leader of the Oni. He aims to engulf Ninjago in darkness, so that the power of creation is forever destroyed. The Omega and the Oni are presumably killed when the ninja combine their powers to perform the Tornado of Creation in the season finale.

== Pyro Vipers ==
Led by Aspheera, the Pyro Vipers are the main antagonists of the eleventh season Secrets of the Forbidden Spinjtzu: The Fire Chapter. Long before the series, Aspheera was magically entombed for attempting to overthrow the King of the Serpentine. In Season 11: The Fire Chapter she is accidentally released by the ninja. Upon her release, she steals Kai's fire power and uses it to revive the mummified Serpentine to exact revenge on her "Treacherous Deceiver" and burn Ninjago City.

- Aspheera (voiced by Pauline Newstone in Season 11 and Kathleen Barr in Crystallized) is the main antagonist of Season 11: The Fire Chapter and a sorceress of the Serpentine who desired to learn Spinjitzu when Wu and Garmadon were children. In exchange for learning the art, she released young Garmadon and Wu from the dungeons after they trespassed on Serpentine land. Wu taught her the art of Spinjitzu but she betrayed her promise to never use Spinjitzu for evil and overthrew King Mambo V. She was eventually defeated and sentenced to magical entombment. In Season 11, she is unwittingly freed by the ninja while exploring a pyramid in the Desert of Doom. She steals Kai's fire power and attempts to conquer Ninjago City and seeks revenge on Wu but is defeated by Zane and locked in Kryptarium Prison. In Season 15, she is broken out by the Ninja to remove Nya's mergence with the Endless Sea from her before being recruited by Harumi to join the Council of the Crystal King. Aspheera is eventually defeated yet again when Zane freezes her once more.
- Char (voiced by Brian Drummond) is a Pyro Viper and Aspheera's servant.
- King Mambo V (voiced by Michael Dobson) is the King of the Serpentine during the days of the First Spinjitzu Master. The character's name is derived from the song Mambo No. 5.

== Never-Realm inhabitants ==
The Ice Emperor and his Blizzard Samurai rule the Never-Realm and serve as the main antagonists of the eleventh season Season 11: The Ice Chapter. Before the series begins, the Ice Emperor attacks the village of the Formlings, turning them all into blocks of ice, except for Akita and Kataru. The Formlings are shapeshifters who can take the form of various animals.

- The Ice Emperor (voiced by Brent Miller under the pseudonym Graeme Pailsade) is the overarching antagonist of Season 11: The Ice Chapter and rules the Never-Realm with his army of Blizzard Samurai. He is eventually revealed to be Zane, who arrived in the Never-Realm long before the ninja. Zane had his memory erased by Vex, who pulled the plug while he attempted a system diagnostic. Vex manipulates Zane into conquering the Never-Realm and becoming the Ice Emperor. In the finale, Zane regains his memories and transforms the Never-Realm back to its normal state by destroying his sceptre.
- General Vex (voiced by Michael Kopsa) is the main antagonist of Season 11: The Ice Chapter and the Ice Emperor's general of the Blizzard Samurai. He was originally a Formling but was excluded and mocked for being unable to find his animal form. He manipulates Zane into becoming the Ice Emperor but is banished in the Never-Realm when Zane regains his memory.
- Grimfax (voiced by Brian Drummond) is the leader of the Blizzard Samurai army. He was the ruler of the Never-Realm before Zane and Vex usurped him. He becomes an ally of Lloyd and Kataru later in the season. Once Zane regains his memories and destroys his sceptre, Grimfax reclaims his throne and aligns with the Formlings to banish Vex once and for all.
- Akita (voiced by Tabitha St. Germain) is a Formling with the ability to change into a vulpine wolf. She accompanies Lloyd with the aim of exacting revenge on the Ice Emperor for attacking and freezing the Formlings. She reunites with her brother, Kataru when Zane destroys the Scroll of Forbidden Spinjitzu.
- Kataru (voiced by Cole Howard) is Akita's twin brother, and a Formling with the ability to change into a bear. He was thought to be dead when Boreal freezes him but is later revealed to be a prisoner held in the Ice Emperor's dungeon. He helps Lloyd and Grimfax to bring Zane back to his normal self.
- Sorla (voiced by Patty Drake) is a village elder and the leader of Great Lake. Sorla helps and mentors the ninja during their time in the Never-Realm. She helps Kai to regain his fire power and Nya to begin mastering ice.
- Krag (voiced by Brian Drummond) is the last surviving yeti in the Never-Realm who Cole befriends when his kind are wiped out by the Blizzard Samurai.

== Prime Empire inhabitants ==
Unagami and his Red Visors serve as the main antagonists of the twelfth season Prime Empire and inhabit the video game called Prime Empire. Unagami is aided by the Mechanic in the real world of Ninjago City to open a portal between Prime Empire and the real world. To stop him, the Ninja are forced to battle through the many levels of the game, while avoiding the Red Visors.

- Unagami (Unfinished Adventure Game I) (voiced by Dean Redman (AI) and Zion Simpson (child form)) is the main antagonist of Season 12 and an artificial intelligence (AI) that develops into the video game Prime Empire (created with the working title of Unfinished Adventure Game I). With the help of the Mechanic, he constructs a portal from Prime Empire into Ninjago, but agrees to undo his evil deeds after reuniting with his creator, Milton Dyer in the season finale.
- Milton Dyer (voiced by Mark Hildreth) is the creator of Prime Empire who went missing after people began disappearing inside the video game. In Season 12, he is found by P.I.X.A.L. and helps to stop Unagami by apologising for abandoning him.
- The Mechanic (voiced by Michael Antonakos (Season 6, Season 11-onwards), Alan Marriott (Season 8) is a recurring secondary antagonist and former noodle truck repairman. In Season 6, he intimidates the ninja while in prison, hoping to steal robotic parts from Zane. He reappears in Season 8 as a minor character, fighting Kai and Zane. In Season 11, he reappears and reveals that he despises Nya the most of all the ninja. In Season 12, he allies himself with Unagami and assists with opening the portal from Prime Empire into the real world. In Season 15, he was the last villain to be recruited by Harumi to join the Council of the Crystal King. He later fought Nya during the final battle, only to be defeated by the combined forces of her and Okino.
- Scott (voiced by Adrian Petriw) is a beta-tester of Prime Empire who has been trapped in the game for over 30 years. After sacrificing himself to aid the ninja, he is able to escape Prime Empire and return to Ninjago City.
- Okino (voiced by Alessandro Juliani) is a samurai that guides players to the purple Key-Tana in Terra Karana. He decides to go his own way after learning that he can make his own decisions. He is seen protecting the citizens of Ninjago from Unagami's forces. Okino is often seen in Ninjago city protecting the citizens whenever disaster strikes.
- Racer Seven (voiced by Shannon Chan-Kent) is a non-player character (NPC) in Prime Empire and a racer in the Speedway Five-Billion race who is programmed to lose. She is recruited by Lloyd and helps the ninja to win the second Key-Tana. After being freed from Prime Empire, Seven changes her name to Blazey H. Speed.
- Sushimi (voiced by Vincent Tong) is a sushi chef and non-player character (NPC) in Prime Empire. He is the final boss battle of Prime Empire when players reach the Temple of Madness.
- Richie is a Whack Rat from Prime Empire and a racer in the Speedway Five-Billion race. After Jay consults with Unagami, Richie decides to stay in Ninjago and help the citizens along with his creator.
- Ritchie (voiced by Sam Vincent) is a Whack Rat from Prime Empire and a racer in the Speedway Five-Billion race. He tricked the ninja into a room full of Red Visors in the Forest of Discontent. After Jay consults with Unagami, Ritchie decides to stay in Ninjago and help the citizens along with his creator.
- Targle is a Whack Rat from Prime Empire. After Jay consults with Unagami, Targle decides to stay in Ninjago and help the citizens along with his creator. After the Merge, Targle formed a close bond with Kreel, but was soon captured by Dorama for his shows. He was saved by Lloyd, Arin, and Sora.

== Kingdom of Shintaro inhabitants ==
The Dungeons of Shintaro are hidden beneath the Kingdom of Shintaro and ruled by an evil Skull Sorcerer and his Awakened Warriors, who serve as the main antagonists of the thirteenth season Master of the Mountain. The Skull Sorcerer acquires his power from an ancient skull called the Skull of Hazza D’ur, which can resurrect the Awakened Warriors. The Skull Sorcerer uses his power to enslave the Geckles and the Munce to mine Vengestone from the mountain for Harumi and the Crystal King.

- King Vangelis/The Skull Sorcerer (voiced by Deven Mack under the pseudonym Ervin M Jordan) is the main antagonist of Season 13, the ruler of the Kingdom of Shintaro and father of Princess Vania. Vangelis reveals himself to be the Skull Sorcerer, who uses the Skull of Hazza D'ur to enslave the Munce and Geckles to mine vengestone to sell to an unknown buyer. He is eventually defeated by Cole by using the Spinjitzu Burst and is later arrested and overthrown by Princess Vania. In Season 15, he is recruited by Harumi to join the Council of the Crystal King only to be defeated by Cole yet again.
- Princess Vania (voiced by Sabrina Pitre) is the princess of the Kingdom of Shintaro and daughter to King Vangelis. In Season 13, Vania takes an instant liking to Cole and aids the Ninja upon the discovery of mines beneath Shintaro. She becomes the queen of Shintaro following her father's defeat and pledges her alliance to Cole and the Ninja.
- Hailmar (voiced by Brian Drummond) is the right-hand man of King Vangelis and leader of the Winged Guards of Shintaro.
- Engelbert (voiced by Brian Drummond) is an old Sky Folk who lives in the Kingdom of Shintaro.
- Hazza D'ur (voiced by Michael Adamthwaite) is the previous sorcerer of the Dungeons of Shintaro, who is now a green skull allied with the Skull Sorcerer. The skull is destroyed when Cole uses the Spinjitzu Burst to defeat King Vangelis.
- Murtessa (voiced by Tabitha St. Germain) is the queen of the Munce who takes an instant liking to Jay and challenges Nya to a duel for his hand in marriage. When she loses the duel, Nya is made the new queen of the Munce. Murtessa is eventually restored to her former position as queen in the season finale.
- Murt (voiced by Michael Adamthwaite) is a member of the Munce who possesses low intelligence.
- Gulch (voiced by Andrew McNee) is the leader/chancellor of the Geckles. He forces Kai and Zane to undergo a “trial by mino”. After they survive the trial, Gulch reassigns his position as chancellor to Kai. Gulch eventually restored to his former position as chancellor in the season finale. Gulch came to the Crossroads to judge a contest based on Zane, but failed to recognize Zane himself when he participated and came dead last.
- Gleck (voiced by Brian Drummond) is a member of the Geckles who possesses a locket that belonged to Cole's mother, Lilly. He is the only Geckle who believes that the Munce didn't steal the Blades of Deliverance.
- Fungus (voiced by Ian James Corlett) is a member of the Upply and a skilled alchemist magician, who was betrayed by King Vangelis and cast into Rock-Bottom of Shintaro Mountain. He and the Upply team up with Cole, Wu, and Vania to return to the surface.
- Korgran (voiced by Paul Dobson) is a member of the Upply and a skilled warrior from Metalonia, who wields a sentient axe that only he can hear. He was betrayed by King Vangelis and cast into Rock-Bottom of Shintaro Mountain. He and the Upply team up with Cole, Wu, and Vania to return to the surface.
- Plundar (voiced by Adam Trask) is a member of the Upply and an expert thief who determines all of his decisions through a set of dice. He was betrayed by King Vangelis and cast into Rock-Bottom of Shintaro Mountain. He and the Upply team up with Cole, Wu, and Vania to return to the surface. He also has a pet spider named Adam who joins the group on their quest.

== Island of the Keepers inhabitants ==
Chief Mammatus and the Keepers are the false antagonists of The Island. The Keepers are a group of native islanders who worship a mythical sea creature named Wojira.

- Chief Mammatus (voiced by Paul Dobson) is the false main antagonist of The Island and the leader of the Keepers, a native tribe who worship Wojira. He instructs the Keepers to capture the Ninja when they arrive on the island. When he finds out about Ronin's trickery, he helps and apologizes to the ninja for his acts, and they forgive him.
- Timothy "Twitchy Tim" Batterson (voiced by Brian Drummond) is an explorer who once ventured to the island and was hit by lightning twelve times. He helps the ninja on their expedition to explore the island, and briefly reappears in Season 15.

== Merlopians ==
The Merlopians are aquatic beings that live deep under the Endless Sea in the Kingdom of Merlopia and are the antagonists of Seabound. They attack Ninjago City under the rule of Kalmaar to avenge the death of his father, King Trimaar although Kalmaar killed his father to awaken Wojira to destroy the surface world.

- Prince Kalmaar (voiced by Giles Panton) is the main antagonist of Seabound and prince of the Merlopians. He performs a palace coup by killing his father King Trimaar with his trident and declaring himself as king. In the season finale, he is devoured by Wojira after his trident is destroyed by Benthomaar.
- King Trimaar (voiced by Ron Halder) is the benevolent king of the Merlopians who is killed and overthrown by Kalmaar, his son.
- Benthomaar (voiced by Cole Howard) is the adopted son of King Trimaar, who helps the ninja escape from Merlopia. In Season 15, it is mentioned that he is the new King of Merlopia.
- Gripe (voiced by Brian Drummond) is Kalmaar's merservant.
- Glutinous (voiced by Sam Vincent) is a Merlopian scientist who helps Kalmaar awaken Wojira.

== New Ninja ==
The New Ninja are a group of vigilantes hired by the New Mayor Mayor Trustable to replace the Ninja, whom they idolize before the Ninja break Aspheera out of Kryptarium Prison to take her staff to save Nya.

- The Teal Ninja (voiced by Ryan Beil) is the leader of the New Ninja.
- The Fuchsia Ninja (voiced by Travis Turner) is a member of the New Ninja.
- The Orange Ninja (voiced by Kelly Sheridan) is a member of the New Ninja.
- The Pink Ninja (voiced by Michael Adamthwaite) is a member of the New Ninja.
- The Yellow Ninja is a member of the New Ninja.

== Council of the Crystal King ==
The Council of the Crystal King is a council brought together by Harumi to serve the Overlord, who is now known as the Crystal King.

- Mister F is the first recruit in the Council of the Crystal King. He is a new model of Mr. E. He faces Zane in the final battle, only to be crushed by a billboard.

== Claws of Imperium ==
A militaristic army commanded by Beatrix, their goal was to colonize the Merged Realms by taking control every Source Dragons from every world, until Beatrix's efforts were exposed. They have plans to form a council. After Imperium was reformed, Rapton went back to hunting dragons and formed the Freebooters, which consisted of him and a few rogue Claw members.

- Beatrix Vespasian-Orus (voiced by Nicole Oliver) was the power hungry empress of Imperium who took the throne after arranging her father's murder and framing her older twin sister, and orders the capture of as many dragons as possible in an effort to colonize the Merged Realms, until the Ninja broke them out, leaving her to spread false rumors and plan her revenge against the Ninja. In the season finale, her efforts were exposed to the citizens and was kicked into a MergeQuake by Arin.
- Rapton (voiced by Giles Panton) is the field leader of the Claws of Imperium who traps many dragons. He eventually joins Percival's resistance in liberating Imperium. After Imperium was reformed, Rapton turns back to his old ways of hunting dragons, now only to sell money.
- Lord Ras (voiced by Brian Drummond) is a black and purple colored tiger warrior who served on Imperium's military, aiding the Claws in capturing Source Dragons until he was stripped of his position. He managed to escape and recruits Jordana on behalf of his master. He's physically strong and wields a hammer.
- Dr. LaRow (voiced by Ashleigh Ball) is the chief scientist in Imperium who turned its citizens against Sora for opposing dragon energy.
- Jordana (voiced by Diana Kaarina) is Dr. LaRow's former assistant who took the position meant for self-proclaimed rival Sora before she opposed dragon energy. Jordana led the project to extract dragon energy from the Source Dragon to create a Dragon Core and was recruited by Ras for her efforts on behalf of his master. From the ritual of the Blood Moon to the end of the Tournament of Sources, she was possessed by Rox, one of the members of the Forbidden Five.
- Dorama (voiced by Mackenzie Gray) is a former pyro-technician who was exposed by Lloyd, Arin, and Sora for using Whack Rats to power his fireworks. He was brought to Imperium to assist Dr. LaRow. After Imperium's demise, he went solo and kidnapped random people to try and use them as acts, but was stopped by Cole, Zane, and Bonzle and arrested.

== Wolf Clan ==
The Wolf Clan was formed by the Forbidden Five millennia ago and wreaked havoc on their home realm of the Wyldness. They were reformed by Ras millennia later, but were dissolved once again following their defeat at the hands of the Elemental Masters after the Tournament of the Sources.

- Cinder (voiced by Ian Hanlin) is the current Master of Smoke who knows Shatterspin.

== Forbidden Five ==
The Forbidden Five are a group of evil elemental masters who once conquered their home realm of the Wyldness and wanted to conquer all of the sixteen realms (now Merged Realms); however before they could continue with their plans, Egalt and Rontu managed to banish the Five to the Nether-Space. They were released by Nokt after the Tournament of the Sources.

- Nokt (voiced by Deven Mack) is one of the members of the Forbidden Five who alongside other the Forbidden Five wanted to conquer Sixteen realms (now Merged Realms) but was banished to the Nether-Space alongside the other members of the Forbidden Five for his crimes. During the Ritual of the Blood Moon, he was the only one who managed to escape from the Nether-Space as Bonzle later succeeded in closing the portal. After the Wolf Clan's defeat, Nokt reprimanded Ras for not freeing all of the members of the Forbidden Five only to be subjected to an electrical control device, forcing him to be loyal to Ras. He later participates in the Tournament of the Sources where he beats the Elemental Masters and succeeds in releasing the rest of the Five, which in turn weakens them.
- Rox (voiced by Emily Tennant) is one of the members of the Forbidden Five. During the Ritual of the Blood Moon, Rox attempts to escape the Nether-Space, but only her soul was able to escape, which possessed Jordana until the end of the Tournament of the Sources, when her physical body was freed from the Nether-Space, although weakened.
- Zarkt (voiced by Michael Adamthwaite) is one of the members of the Forbidden Five. He was able to communicate with the other trapped two using Rox's body while in the Nether-Space. After the Tournament of the Sources, Zarkt was freed from the Nether-Space alongside the other four, although weakened.
- Drix (voiced by Lee Tockar) is one of the members of the Forbidden Five. He was able to communicate with the other trapped two using Rox's body while in the Nether-Space. After the Tournament of the Sources, Drix was freed from the Nether-Space alongside the other four, although weakened.
- Kur (voiced by Ashleigh Ball) is one of the members of the Forbidden Five. She was able to communicate with the other trapped two using Rox's body while in the Nether-Space. After the Tournament of the Sources, Kur was freed from the Nether-Space alongside the other four, although weakened.

== Citizens of Ninjago City ==
- Captain Soto (voiced by Alan Marriott) is a secondary recurring antagonist, leader of a band of pirates and the original captain of the Destiny's Bounty. He makes his first appearance when he was resurrected by Lord Garmadon in Season 2 and has served as both a minor antagonist and an ally to the ninja in subsequent seasons.
- No-Eyed Pete (voiced by Paul Dobson) is a recurring character and visually impaired member of Captain Soto's crew.
- The Postman (voiced by Michael Adamthwaite) is a recurring character who tirelessly delivers the mail around Ninjago.
- Warden Noble (voiced by Paul Dobson) is the warden of Kryptarium Prison.
- Gayle Gossip (voiced by Kelly Sheridan) is an anchorwoman for NGTV (Ninjago Television).
- Fred Finely (voiced by Bill Newton) is a reporter for Ninjago City News.
- Dan Vaapit (voiced by Ian Hanlin) is an anchor for NGTV news.
- Vinny Folson (voiced by Gavin Langelo) is Gayle Gossip's cameraman, who helps to change Garmadon.
- Fugi-Dove (voiced by Adrian Petriw) is a Kryptarium Prison inmate who claims he is the ninja's "frequent and well-known archenemy." Introduced in Season 11, he despises Jay the most of all the ninja. Despite his claims of being a famous criminal, he has no criminal record for unknown reasons, implying he may suffer from delusions of grandeur. He makes cameo appearances in later seasons. In Season 15, he escapes with the Ninja before selflessly getting himself caught to help them escape. Later, he escapes again to help them battle the Overlord.
- Miss Demeanor (voiced by Erin Mathews) is a criminal pyromaniac who acts as a henchman for hire so she'll get paid.
- Rufus McCallister (voiced by Paul Dobson) (also known as Mother Doomsday) is a worker at the Ninjago Doomsday Comix store.
- Patty Keys (voiced by Cathy Weseluck) is a real estate agent and tour guide in Ninjago City.
- Cecil Putnam (voiced by Paul Dobson) is an archaeologist and the manager of the Explorers Club.
- Smythe (voiced by Michael Adamthwaite) is an archaeologist and a member of the Explorers Club.
- Percy Shippelton (voiced by Brian Drummond) is an archaeologist and a member of the Explorers Club.
- Dwayne (voiced by Sam Vincent) is a former intern working for Clutch Powers, who currently works as assistant to Mayor Trustable.
- Sammy (voiced by Tabitha St. Germain) is a paperboy in Ninjago City. In Season 15, he leads the paperboys as a resistance group.
- Jake (voiced by Nicholas Holmes) is a fan of Kai, who reminds him of what it means to be a hero in the Fire Chapter of Season 11. He later meets up with Kai, Cole and Skylor in Season 15, while hiding from the Crystal Army before helping him reunite with his parents.
- Ulysses Trustable (voiced by Charles Demers) is the incumbent and neglectful new mayor of Ninjago City, who despises hates and blames the Ninja for destruction ruination and devastation of ninjago and ninjago city and their destructive actions. He has a pet cat called Mr. Fussly Fussly. He runs away from town after the Crystal army invasion after his New Ninja were turned into crystal zombies by Overlord's Crystal Army.
- William Toughbutt (voiced by Garry Chalk) is a federal judge, who sentences the Ninja to five years in Kryptarium Prison for breaking Aspheera out to save Nya.
- Hounddog McBrag (voiced by Michael Dobson) is the Marshal of the Ninjago City Police, who was sent by Mayor Trustable to relentlessly pursue the Ninja in Season 15, until Lloyd saves him from some Serpentine.

== Citizens of the Crossroads ==
The Crossroads was created for the people who lost their families in the Merge.

- Kreel (voiced by Kelly Sheridan) is a mech racer in charge of a gang consisting of Whack Rats and a junkyard owner.
- Lobbo (voiced by Brian Drummond) is a robot mech racer who won the Mech Master 5000 due to Riyu's interference. He seems to have had conflicts with his mother and his girlfriend prior to the Merge.

== Citizens of Imperium ==
Also known as Imperians, who live in the city of Imperium that runs entirely on dragon power by order of Empress Beatrix, until her efforts were exposed. They now have plans of forming a council.

- Levo Vespasian-Orus (voiced by Ron Halder) was Beatrix's father, the previous Elemental Master of Shockwave, and former Emperor of Imperium. He intended the pass the throne onto his oldest daughter, Zeatrix, only to be killed by Beatrix, with Ras' help.
- Zeatrix Vespasian-Orus (voiced by Nicole Oliver) is Beatrix's older twin sister and the current Elemental Master of Shockwave, who was next-in-line for the throne of Imperium until Beatrix and Ras killed her father and then framed and exiled her. Zeatrix participates in the Tournament of the Sources years later, but attacks Lloyd during one of the games, resulting in her exile from the tournament.
- Percival Tartigrade (voiced by Aidan Drummond) is a young boy whom tried to befriend Arin, until he discovered the latter was harboring Riyu before personally turning the latter in to Empress Beatrix. After hearing her claim that dragons that escaped were recaptured, Percival discovered the truth as well as learning she arranged for her father's death and led a resistance against her.

== Mucoids ==
The Mucoids are a species of snail people.

- Zant-Tanz (voiced by Garry Chalk) is acting general of the Mucoid Warriors and supreme leader of the Mother Garden. He later finds out that he is the current Elemental Master of Nature. He was framed before the Tournament of the Sources to have attacked the ninja and Zur, and was exiled back to the Mother Garden as a result.
- Grab-Barg (voiced by Deven Mack) is a Mucoid chef who has a rivalry with Arin over who makes the best pies. He also judged a contest based on Zane. He currently lives in the Crossroads.
- Tope-Epot (voiced by Brian Drummond) is a Mucoid who participated in the Zane-alike contest. He currently lives in the Crossroads.

== The Finders ==
The Finders are a group of exiles who lived in the Land of Lost Things.

- Geo (voiced by Peter Kelamis) is a Munce with the coloring of a Geckle, who was shunned upon by both tribes before eventually being exiled. He is the Elemental Master of Fusion.
- Bonzle (voiced by Michelle Creber) is a spell in the form of a skeleton. She was formed by the High Sorceress as a spell to eradicate the Forbidden Five. After that, she traveled across the realms until meeting Master Wu. Upon her meeting with the sensei, the spell changed her form into a skeleton and named herself Bonzle.
- Fritz (voiced by Vincent Tong) is a Formling.
- Spitz (voiced by Sabrina Pitre) is a Hypnobrai.

== Administration Agents ==
Administration Agents are amnesiac agents who hail from the Administration, which is located in the Realm of Madness.

- Agent Roderick Allen (voiced by Michael Adamthwaite) is a human agent who detained Zane, and questioned Lloyd and Arin before discovering they had false permits. He is normally paired with Agent Underwood.
- Agent Underwood (voiced by Rhona Rees) is a Hypnobrai agent who detained Zane, and question Lloyd and Arin before discovering they had false permits. She is normally paired with Agent Allen.
- Sub-Agent Prentis (voiced by Ian Hanlin) is a human agent in charge of returning misled citizens to their original realms.
- Agent Denholt (voiced by Kazumi Evans) is a human agent that was responsible for taking the Mother Garden's Dragon Core, alongside Agent Karit.
- Agent Karit (voiced by Mark Hildreth) is a human agent that was responsible for taking the Mother Garden's Dragon Core, alongside Agent Denholt.

== Citizens of the City of Temples ==
The City of Temples was where the Tournament of Sources is held annually.

- Roby (voiced by Ryan Beil) is the current Games Master for the Tournament of the Sources. During the ninja's time at the tournament, he and Wyldfyre fall in love.
- Bleckt (voiced by Vincent Tong) is Roby's uncle and the former Minister of Ledgering for the Tournament of the Sources. He secretly allied with Ras to get rid of the ninja from the tournament but was later defeated by the Elemental Masters and imprisoned with the Wolf Clan.

== See also ==
- List of Ninjago episodes
- Lego Ninjago (video game franchise)
