= Samurai X =

Samurai X may refer to:

- Rurouni Kenshin (1996 TV series), sometimes called Samurai X, a Japanese anime television series
- Samurai X, the alias of two characters in the television series Ninjago, namely Nya and P.I.X.A.L.
