= Wishmaster =

Wishmaster may refer to:

- Wishmaster (film), a 1997 American film
- Wishmaster (album), an album by Nightwish, and a song on that album

== See also ==
- Wishmasters, an episode of Ninjago: Masters of Spinjitzu
