= Ninjago: Possession =

Danish animated television season in 2015

- Season 5
- Possession poster
- Starring: Jillian Michaels; Vincent Tong; Michael Adamthwaite; Brent Miller; Kirby Morrow; Kelly Metzger; Paul Dobson; Kathleen Barr; Jennifer Hayward; Andrew Francis; Brian Dobson
- No. of episodes: 10

Release
- Original network: Cartoon Network
- Original release: June 29 – July 10, 2015

Season chronology
- ← Previous; Tournament of Elements Next → Skybound

Possession is the fifth season of the animated television series Ninjago: Masters of Spinjitzu (titled Ninjago from the eleventh season onward). The series was created by Michael Hegner and Tommy Andreasen. The season aired from June 29 to July 10, 2015, following the fourth season titled Tournament of Elements. It is succeeded by the sixth season, titled Skybound.

The season introduces the ghost of Morro as the main season antagonist, who possesses the central character Lloyd Garmadon. Possession is the first season to include the character of Nya in the ninja team as the Light Blue Ninja and Elemental Master of Water. It also introduces Airjitzu, a new ability that is shown to be similar to the show's fictional martial art of Spinjitzu, but allows the ninja characters to levitate off the ground.

== Voice cast ==
=== Main ===
- Jillian Michaels as Lloyd Garmadon, the Green Ninja and Elemental Master of Energy
- Vincent Tong as Kai, the Red Ninja and Elemental Master of Fire
- Michael Adamthwaite as Jay, the Blue Ninja and Elemental Master of Lightning
- Brent Miller as Zane, the Titanium Ninja and Elemental Master of Ice
- Kirby Morrow as Cole, the Black Ninja and Elemental Master of Earth
- Kelly Metzger as Nya, the Light Blue Ninja, Elemental Master of Water and Kai's sister
- Paul Dobson as Sensei Wu, the wise teacher of the ninja
- Kathleen Barr as Misako
- Jennifer Hayward as P.I.X.A.L., a female nindroid
- Andrew Francis as Morro
- Brian Dobson as Ronin

=== Supporting ===
- Alan Marriott as Dareth
- Mark Oliver as Sensei Garmadon
- Brian Dobson as Soul Archer
- Kathleen Barr as Bansha
- Michael Adamthwaite as Wrayth
- Paul Dobson as Ghoultar/Fenwick
- Michael Donovan as Sensei Yang
- Cathy Weseluck as Patty Keys
- Lee Tockar as Cyrus Borg
- Heather Doerksen as Skylor
- Ian James Corlett as Master Chen
- Scott McNeil as Clouse

== Marketing and release ==
The season trailer was released on June 8, 2015 on YouTube. The season premiered on June 29, 2015 on Cartoon Network. The episodes were released throughout June and July 2015 until the season finale, which was released in two parts. Curseworld Part 1 was released on July 9, 2015 and Curseworld Part 2 was released on July 10 of the same year.

== Synopsis ==
A ghost from the Cursed Realm named Morro escaped and possessed the body of Lloyd, because of jealousy being unworthy as the Legendary Green Ninja; Morro is the elemental master of wind and Sensei Wu's first student, he wanted to take control of the Preeminent and become the Green Ninja. The ninja had to find the Realm Crystal and learn special "Airjitzu", Nya is learnt to be the successor of her mother as the Elemental Master of Water, as water is a weakness to ghosts.

== Episodes ==
No. overall	No. in season	Title	Directed by	Written by	Original release date	U.S. viewers (millions)
45	1	"Winds of Change"	Michael Helmuth Hansen	The Hageman Brothers	June 29, 2015	2.05
Lloyd is ambushed in the Ninjago City Museum by Morro, a ghost who escaped the Cursed Realm, and ends up getting possessed. Morro steals the Allied Armor, that lets him summon other ghosts from the Cursed Realm, and goes to Sensei Wu's tea shop ( Steep Wisdom )to get the staff that was given to him by the First Spinjitzu Master. Without Lloyd powering them, the other Ninja lose their elemental powers and have no choice but to escape with Wu on the Destiny's Bounty, with Morro in pursuit, riding Lloyd's elemental dragon. Wu reveals that Morro was his first student and the Elemental Master of Wind.
46	2	"Ghost Story"	Jens Møller	The Hageman Brothers	June 30, 2015	1.83
Morro boards the Destiny's Bounty and tries to get Sensei Wu's staff, but Wu throws it overboard. Morro goes after the staff while the ship crashes. The Ninja learn that the staff had three engravings on it: clues to locating the tomb of the First Spinjitzu Master. The first clue is the Scroll of Airjitsu, which is in the possession of a thief named Ronin. They travel to Ronin's home in Stiix, a city built on water, but are intercepted by one of Morro's ghost allies. The Ninja defeat the ghost, discovering that their weakness is water. Wu reveals that Kai and Nya's mother Maya was the Elemental Master of Water, just as their father Ray was the Elemental Master of Fire and that Nya has the potential to succeed her, so she must train to become the Light Blue Ninja and Elemental Master of Water.
47	3	"Stiix and Stones"	Peter Hausner	The Hageman Brothers	July 1, 2015	2.13
The Ninja try to purchase the Scroll Of Airjitzu from Ronin, but the price is too high, and they fail to earn the money for it. Morro ends up taking the scroll with the help of his ally, Soul Archer, whom Ronin is indebted to, and uses the scroll to learn Airjitzu. Ronin instead gives the Ninja weapons that can kill ghosts. Meanwhile, Sensei Wu trains Nya to control water, and discovers that her weakness is fear of being weak and helpless.
48	4	"The Temple on Haunted Hill"	Trylle Vilstrup	The Hageman Brothers	July 2, 2015	1.93
Nya and Ronin go to the Samurai X cave where they encounter Morro and his ghosts who are after Nya's samurai Mech. Nya accepts that she is the Elemental Master of Water and conjures a rain in the desert to keep the pursuing ghosts at bay. Meanwhile, the Ninja seek to learn Airjitzu by other means and travel to the haunted temple of Sensei Yang. Their fears are tested by Yang's ghost but they eventually receive a second Scroll Of Airjitzu. As they try to escape before sunrise, Cole drops the scroll and quickly goes back to retrieve it. Unfortunately, he fails to get out in time and the curse of the temple turns him into a ghost.
49	5	"Peak-a-Boo"	Michael Helmuth Hansen	The Hageman Brothers	July 3, 2015	1.82
The Ninja must travel to the Cloud Kingdom to recover the Sword of Sanctuary, the second clue on Wu's staff. To get there, they must climb the tallest mountain in Ninjago and use Airjitzu to jump into a cyclone above. While climbing, they're caught in an avalanche, but they are able to escape thanks to Cole's new ghost abilities. They successfully use Airjitzu to reach the Cloud Kingdom before Morro. Back on the Bounty, Wu and Nya capture one of Morro's allies, Ghoultar, and begin to interrogate him.
50	6	"Kingdom Come"	Jens Møller	The Hageman Brothers	July 6, 2015	1.71
The Ninja search for the Sword of Sanctuary in the Cloud Kingdom, but are betrayed by Fenwick, one of the Kingdom's high ranking inhabitants, who struck a deal with Morro. Morro obtains the sword, and returns to Ninjago with the Ninja in pursuit. Kai takes the Sword from Morro as Lloyd temporarily regains control of his body and the Ninja fly off on board the Bounty, planning their next move.
51	7	"The Crooked Path"	Peter Hausner	The Hageman Brothers	July 7, 2015	1.91
Ronin steals the Sword of Sanctuary and gives it to Morro to pay off his debt to Soul Archer. Morro takes possession of Ronin to trick the Ninja into travelling to his own resting place in the Caves of Despair, where he intends to bury them alive. The Ninja escape and Ronin tries to repay them by entrusting them with the real location of the tomb, which is under the ocean.
52	8	"Grave Danger"	Trylle Vilstrup	The Hageman Brothers	July 8, 2015	1.78
The Ninja reach the underwater tomb with Ronin's vehicle and manage to pass two trials, before encountering Morro. Morro is trapped and the Ninja find the Realm Crystal in the tomb of the First Spinjitzu Master. Morro demands the Realm Crystal in exchange for Lloyd. Kai tricks him, but when the Ninja rush off to save Lloyd, Morro manages to obtain the Realm Crystal, which he uses to open a portal to the Cursed Realm and escape.
53	9	"Curseworld"	Michael Helmuth Hansen	The Hageman Brothers	July 9, 2015	1.52
54	10	"Curseworld"	Jens Møller	The Hageman Brothers	July 10, 2015	1.62
Part I: The Ninja go to Stiix to stop Morro from unleashing his master, the Preeminent, who is the embodiment of the Cursed Realm. They manage to fend off many ghosts, while Lloyd reaches Morro. Morro tries to tempt Lloyd with the promise of releasing his father from the Cursed Realm. Lloyd hesitates, giving time for the Preeminent to be unleashed, while he himself is banished. Part II: In the Cursed Realm, Lloyd meets his father Garmadon, who helps him escape, and he fights Morro across multiple realms, including a realm called "Chima". The Ninja try to stop the preeminent, but it proves to be too powerful. The ghost army is also infinite, since any ghost they kill just reemerges from the Cursed Realm through the Preeminent. The Ninja evacuate Stiix, while Nya unlocks her true potential and drowning the Preeminent. Wu tries to save Morro, but the ghost chooses to drown instead, and passes on to the departed realm with the other ghosts. Using the Realm Crystal, the Ninja bring back Lloyd, who follows in his father's footsteps and becomes a master. This episode includes a crossover with Legends of Chima.

== Reception ==
=== Ratings ===
The season premier of Possession achieved rank 22 in the top 100 Monday cable originals on June 29, 2015 with 2.05 million viewers.

=== Critical reception ===
Reviewer Melissa Camacho for Common Sense Media gave Possession a 3 out of 5 star rating and noted that the season features cartoon violence but also includes themes of "loyalty, teamwork, and sacrifice". The reviewer also commented, "this a solid choice for action lovers. The loss of a loved one also is a central theme in this series installment."

== Other media ==
An associated action-adventure game titled Lego Ninjago: Shadow of Ronin was released on March 24, 2015, to accompany the season. It was developed by TT Fusion and published by Warner Bros. Interactive Entertainment. The game is available on PlayStation Vita, Nintendo 3DS and IOS.

== See also ==
- List of Ninjago characters
- Lego Ninjago (video game franchise)
