= Ninjago (TV series) =

Animated television series (2011–2022)

- Original logo of the series until 2019
- Also known as: Ninjago: Masters of Spinjitzu (2011–2019)
- Genre: Action; Adventure; Science fantasy; Martial arts; Superhero; Drama
- Based on: Lego Ninjago
- Developed by: Thomas Sørensen; Tommy Andreasen; Thomas Kristensen; Simon Lucas; Nelson LaMonica; Menelaos Florides; William Stahl; Scott Godon-Decoteau; Maarten Simons; Michael Svane Knap; Toby Dutkiewicz; Brian Nielsen; Lars Danielsen; Tommy Kalmar; Cerim Manovi; Robert May; Heidi Rathschau Nielsen; Kevin Burke; Chris "Doc" Wyatt
- Voices of: Jillian Michaels; Sam Vincent; Vincent Tong; Michael Adamthwaite; Brent Miller; Kirby Morrow; Andrew Francis; Kelly Metzger; Paul Dobson; Mark Oliver
- Theme music composer: The Fold
- Opening theme: "The Weekend Whip" by The Fold (seasons 1–7, 11–13, and 15) "Ninjago Overture" by Jay Vincent and Michael Kramer (seasons 8–10 and The Island–season 14)
- Ending theme: "The Weekend Whip" by The Fold (pilot episodes–episode 41, bar episodes 12 & 34); Various music by Jay Vincent and Michael Kramer (episodes 42–209) "Inner Steel" by Ashleigh Ball (episode 210)
- Composers: Jay Vincent; Michael Kramer
- Countries of origin: Denmark; Canada (seasons 11–15)
- Original languages: English; Danish
- No. of seasons: 15
- No. of episodes: 210 (+4 pilot episodes, 1 special and several shorts) (list of episodes)

Production
- Executive producers: Torsten Jacobsen (pilot episodes–season 9); Erik Wilstrup (seasons 1–10); The Hageman Brothers (seasons 4–6, 8–10); Irene Sparre (Day of the Departed–season 10); Keith Malone (seasons 10–15); Bragi Schut (seasons 10–15); Jill Wilfert (seasons 10–15); Robert May (seasons 11–15); Tommy Andreasen (seasons 11–15); Josh Scherba (seasons 11–15); Kirsten Newlands (season 11); Amir Nasdarabi (seasons 12–13); Asa Tait (The Island–season 15)
- Producers: Erik Wilstrup (pilot episodes); Irene Sparre (seasons 1–6); Louise Barkholt (Day of the Departed–season 10); Tommy Andreasen (Day of the Departed–season 10); Nelson LaMonica (Day of the Departed–season 9); Simon Lucas (Day of the Departed–season 9); Cerim Manovi (seasons 8–9); Robert May (season 10); Vicky Kjaer Jensen (seasons 10–13); Ryan Pears (seasons 11–15); Pamela J. Keller (seasons 13–15)
- Running time: 22 minutes (seasons 1–10); 11 minutes (seasons 11–15)
- Production companies: Wil Film ApS (pilot episodes–season 10); WildBrain Studios (seasons 11–15); The Lego Group

Original release
- Network: Cartoon Network (Scandinavia) (Denmark); Teletoon and YTV (Canada); Cartoon Network (United States)
- Release: January 14, 2011 – October 1, 2022

Related
- Legends of Chima; Nexo Knights; Ninjago: Dragons Rising; Lego Dreamzzz

Ninjago (previously known as Ninjago: Masters of Spinjitzu until 2019) is an animated epic-fantasy superhero television series produced by The Lego Group. It was created to coincide with the Lego Ninjago line of construction toys, which is based on the characters and events of the series. It centers on the fictional world of Ninjago, telling the story of a group of six ninja, and their battles against the forces of evil. The series was created by Michael Hegner and Tommy Andreasen, two Danish film producers. The storyline was written by the Hageman Brothers until the ninth season; their successor as the head writer was Bragi Schut. The series features the voices of Jillian Michaels, Sam Vincent, Vincent Tong, Brent Miller, Michael Adamthwaite, Kirby Morrow, Andrew Francis, Kelly Metzger, Paul Dobson, and Mark Oliver. The voice cast was recorded in Canada for its entire run. The music was scored by composers Jay Vincent and Michael Kramer.

The series was in continuous production for over a decade and celebrated its tenth anniversary on January 14, 2021. It began with two pilot episodes in January 2011, which were followed by two 13-episode seasons that aired from December 2011 to November 2012. Both the Lego theme and the series had an intended shelf life of three years with the second season planned as the original ending. However, the success of the series and its product line led to the show continuing production, with thirteen more seasons, a special, a feature film adaptation, and a four-episode miniseries being released. Ninjago: Masters of Spinjitzu was produced in Copenhagen, Denmark, by Wil Film ApS for its first ten seasons. The production was relocated to WildBrain Studios in Canada for the eleventh season, and the series was retitled Ninjago. The series concluded on October 1, 2022, with the second part of the fifteenth season being released on Netflix in Australia and New Zealand.

In Denmark, where the series' original production companies are located, it premiered on Cartoon Network. In Canada, the series was broadcast on Teletoon and YTV.

A sequel series titled Ninjago: Dragons Rising, set in the same continuity, debuted on June 1, 2023.

== Synopsis ==
The show is largely set in the fictional realm of Ninjago. While featuring historically designed buildings and traditional clothing, Ninjago exists in a modern setting centered around the large metropolis of Ninjago City, which features skyscrapers, current-age and futuristic vehicles, modern electronics, mechas and other futuristic technology. The plot focuses on a group of six ninja fighting against the forces of evil, who are also defined as "Elemental Masters", characters who have elemental powers such as fire, water, ice, earth, life, lightning and even technology.

The series began with the ninja team being formed and trained by their ancient master Sensei Wu in the fictional martial art of "Spinjitzu", which is the main fighting method depicted in the show. The ninjas' base originally was an ancient monastery but was later burned down. Then they relocated to their flying junk ship named "Destiny's Bounty", which has varied in design over the course of the series. The pilot episodes introduced the four original ninja characters named Kai, Cole, Jay and Zane and Kai's sister Nya who becomes a ninja later. The character Lloyd Garmadon was introduced in the first season, titled Rise of the Snakes.

The series incorporates a detailed fictional lore, which is woven into the storyline using character dialogue and flashbacks. The lore mainly focuses on the history of the First Spinjitzu Master and his creation of the island of Ninjago:

Long before time had a name, there was the Realm of the Oni and the Dragon...The Dragon had the power to create. The Oni had the power to destroy. Their war was never-ending. But a child arrived, born of both worlds. The child understood the power of both. Without one, you could not have the other. But when the Oni and the Dragon fought over which side the child should choose, the child abandoned their world to start a new one called Ninjago.

— Season 8, Episode 3, The Oni and the Dragon

== Cast and characters ==
Clockwise from far-left: Kai, Cole, Nya, Lloyd, Jay, Wu and Zane

- Lloyd Garmadon (voiced by Jillian Michaels in Seasons 1–7 and Sam Vincent in Seasons 8–15) is the Green Ninja and Elemental Master of Energy (later known as Life). His weapon is a katana. His dragon is Energy Elemental Dragon. His elemental power grants him the ability to manipulate energy. He is the current leader of the ninja, son of Garmadon and Misako, nephew of Master Wu and the grandson of the First Spinjitzu Master. Lloyd makes his debut in the first season following the pilot episodes as a mischievous child wanting to be an evil warlord like his father, which results in childish schemes that are foiled by the original four ninja. Lloyd is reformed by the ninja and Master Wu, before discovering his destiny as the prophesied Green Ninja. While initially mischievous and naive, Lloyd is tempered by experience over the course of the series to become a mature, wise and skilled ninja. Although he is depicted as the youngest member of the team, Lloyd's character has been developed to be its natural leader.
- Kai (voiced by Vincent Tong) is the Red Ninja and Elemental Master of Fire. His weapon is Sword of Fire. His dragon is Fire Elemental Dragon. His elemental power grants him limited pyrokinesis and heat resistance. Kai is fiercely loyal to his friends and family, often willing to do anything to ensure their safety. He often acts on emotion instead of reason, causing him to be hotheaded, cocky, and rash. He also has a strong sense of responsibility towards his friends. Kai is the older brother of Nya and son of Ray and Maya. His love interest is Skylor Chen.
- Cole (voiced by Kirby Morrow from the pilot episodes–Season 14 and Andrew Francis in Season 15) is the Black Ninja and Elemental Master of Earth. His weapon is Scythe of Quakes. His dragon is Earth Elemental Dragon. His elemental power grants him limited earth manipulation and super strength. Described as the original leader of the ninja, he is loyal to his friends and family and has a special love for food, especially cake. He is the son of Lou, a member of a barbershop quartet, and Lilly, the previous Elemental Master of Earth.
- Jay Walker (born Jay Gordon) (voiced by Michael Adamthwaite) is the Blue Ninja and Elemental Master of Lightning. His weapon is Nunchucks of Lightning. His dragon is Lightning Elemental Dragon. His elemental power grants him limited electricity manipulation. He is also a skilled mechanic and is technologically savvy. Jay is inventive and quick-witted, often using comedy to alleviate stressful situations. He is easily excitable and prone to freaking out when in crises but, like the other ninja, is intensely loyal to his friends, especially his girlfriend Nya. He is the son of Cliff Gordon and Libber, the previous Elemental Master of Lightning, but was adopted and raised by Ed and Edna Walker.
- Nya (voiced by Kelly Metzger) is the Light Blue ninja and Elemental Master of Water. Her weapon is a trident. Her dragon is Water Elemental Dragon. She is the original Samurai X. In early seasons she wears red as Samurai X and later, dark red. Since the release of The Lego Ninjago Movie, she has primarily been depicted in gunmetal grey. Her elemental power grants her limited hydrokinesis. Although she is not an original member of the ninja team, Nya joins when her skills as the Elemental Master of Water are needed to defeat the ghosts and the Preeminent in Season 5. Tough and determined, she refuses to let anyone tell her what to do. Though she can sometimes be stubborn, Nya cares about her friends and family, often making the most mature decisions of the group and serving as emotional support. As a skilled mechanic, she often constructs vehicles for the other ninja. Nya is Kai's younger sister, the daughter of Ray and Maya and the girlfriend of Jay Walker.
- Zane Julien (voiced by Brent Miller) is the White Ninja and Elemental Master of Ice. His weapon is the Shurikens of Ice. His dragon is Ice Elemental Dragon. His elemental power grants him limited cryokinesis. Zane is intelligent and calculating, often providing intel to the ninja when required. Initially, he lacks normal social skills, such as a sense of humour, but it is later revealed that Zane is secretly an android (or "Nindroid"), a fact unknown to both the ninja and Zane himself. Though he is still logical and matter-of-fact by nature, his brotherhood with the other ninja has enabled him to develop more human characteristics. He is the son/creation of Dr. Julien.
- Sensei/Master Wu (voiced by Paul Dobson, Caleb Skeris as a baby, Madyx Whiteway as a child) is Elemental Master of Creation, ancient master of the ninja who frequently wields his father's staff. His dragon is Creation Elemental Dragon. He is Lloyd's uncle, younger son of the First Spinjitzu Master and brother to Garmadon. Because of his Oni heritage, Wu has lived for thousands of years.
- Lord/Sensei Garmadon (voiced by Mark Oliver, Kai Emmett as a child) is Elemental Master of Destruction, Lloyd's father, Wu's older brother, Misako's estranged husband, and older son of the First Spinjitzu Master. Garmadon is the main antagonist of the pilot episodes and an overarching antagonist of the first two seasons. In Season 2, he is cleansed of evil and becomes a sensei to the ninja in Season 3. In Season 4, he is sacrificed to the Cursed Realm and resurrected in Season 8 as a being of pure evil. After conquering Ninjago, his reign of terror is finally brought to an end by Lloyd and he is imprisoned in Kryptarium Prison. In Season 10, he is released to help the ninja defeat the Oni, after which he walks free. In Season 15, he reappears to help the Ninja fight the Overlord. Because of his Oni heritage, Garmadon has lived for thousands of years.
- P.I.X.A.L. (Primary Interactive X-ternal Assistant Life-form) (voiced by Jennifer Hayward) is a Samurai X and a female nindroid who makes her debut as an assistant to her creator/father Cyrus Borg in the third season. She joins the ninja team after being influenced by her fellow nindroid Zane. She is disassembled in Season 4, but is then uploaded into Zane's system as an artificial intelligence. In Season 7, she secretly rebuilds herself and becomes the new Samurai X. She often provides technical support to the ninja while serving as Zane's love interest.

== Episodes ==
Season	Subtitle	Episodes	Originally released	
Season	Subtitle	Episodes	First released	Last released
Pilots	Masters of Spinjitzu or Way of the Ninja (Note: No official subtitle has been given to the pilots, though LEGO.com has referred to it as Masters of Spinjitzu, while co-creator Tommy Andreasen has said "[they] have referred to it as Way of the Ninja.")	4	January 14, 2011	
1	Rise of the Snakes	13	December 2, 2011	April 11, 2012
2	Legacy of the Green Ninja	13	July 18, 2012	November 21, 2012
3	Rebooted	8	January 29, 2014	November 26, 2014
4	Tournament of Elements	10	February 23, 2015	April 3, 2015
5	Possession	10	June 29, 2015	July 10, 2015
6	Skybound	10	March 24, 2016	July 15, 2016
Special	Day of the Departed	1	October 29, 2016	
7	Hands of Time	10	May 15, 2017	May 26, 2017
8	Sons of Garmadon	10	April 16, 2018	May 25, 2018
9	Hunted	10	August 11, 2018	August 25, 2018
10	March of the Oni	4	April 19, 2019	
11	Secrets of the Forbidden Spinjitzu	30	June 22, 2019	February 1, 2020
12	Prime Empire	16	July 19, 2020	August 30, 2020
13	Master of the Mountain	16	September 13, 2020	October 25, 2020
Miniseries (Note: In some countries, it was broadcast as a 4-part miniseries and in others as a special.)	The Island	4	March 7, 2021	March 14, 2021
14	Seabound	16	April 4, 2021	April 30, 2021
15	Crystalized	30	May 20, 2022	October 1, 2022

== Production and development ==
=== Concept ===
In 2009, The Lego Group proposed to make an original intellectual property about ninja, which focused four ninja with elemental powers. The Lego Ninjago theme concept originated in the Lego Ninja theme, which was released by The Lego Group in 1998. This theme was then replaced by Lego Knights in 2000. In 2011, Lego Ninjago was launched and included some of the concepts from the Lego Ninja theme, such as dragons and fortresses, but also combined this with a modern setting. The Ninjago: Masters of Spinjitzu television series was created by Michael Hegner and Tommy Andreasen, two Danish film producers.

During the early development of the concept, The Lego Group conducted ethnographic research with children to determine their interests. Cerim Manovi, Senior Design Manager for the theme recalled, "Ninjas crystallised themselves because we were, like: 'What's the greatest hero entry point?' We showed them superheroes, everything – but ninjas just grabbed kids right there". The Lego Group had been attempting to develop a toy line based on ninjas for several years but a product range had never been successfully developed due to the limitations of the concept. This changed once the idea was developed into a high concept fantasy theme. Researchers at The Lego Group began testing ideas for enemies and eventually skeletons were chosen as the main antagonists in the storyline, following research conducted with six-year-old boys. The skeletons were considered to be the perfect adversaries for the ninjas because they looked inherently evil and fantastical. Other initial concepts for the enemies, such as snakes and robots were rejected, but then used later in subsequent seasons of the series. The ninja characters were given different coloured suits and unique elemental powers to make them more interesting and give them individual personalities. The motivation for the ninja characters was initially presented as a fight about obtaining four golden weapons.

The first concept drawing was created by Tommy Andreasen in late 2009, which depicted five elemental ninjas with their elemental tornadoes and included the word "Spinjago". This would later become the fictional martial art of "Spinjitzu", a combination of the words "spin" and "ninjitsu". Andreasen recalled being called into a meeting on a Friday evening where he created the rough concept sketch of the characters. He then contacted an artist in Canada named Craig Sellars, who painted an internal concept image of the characters over the weekend and sent it back on the following Monday. Andreasen recalled that this was a "linchpin moment" that was the beginning of the concept and the television series. The Ninjago brand name was a combination of the words "ninja" and "go", which was split from the end of "Lego". The series title was also used as the main ninja battle cry.

=== Writing ===
Kevin and Dan Hageman were the screenwriters for the Ninjago television series from the initial development phase until the ninth season. They became involved in the project after being invited to pitch an early story concept for a Lego-based movie that would eventually be titled The Lego Movie. After making a successful pitch to The Lego Group for the film, the Hageman Brothers were asked to write the story for a 44-minute animated television special based on an original Lego property about ninjas. Initially it was intended to be a one-hour special, but the Hageman Brothers decided that they wanted to make it into a saga similar to a high-end blockbuster movie, "like Star Wars with ninjas". They took their inspiration from movies and television shows of the time, including films produced by Marvel and Steven Spielberg. Dan Hageman recalled, "We're looking at Star Wars. We're creating a land and there's magic in this land, there's weapons in this land, there's vehicles in this land...we wanted to make something not necessarily that would appeal to children, but that would appeal to us". Kevin Hageman noted that there was a lot of disposable entertainment for children at that time. He explained, "We wanted something that treats the kids intelligently, also emotionally intelligently. They understand drama. Let's give them a story that's going to continue because it's serialised...we thought of it more as one giant movie or a miniseries. I think that really added a lot of depth, a lot of heart, to Ninjago that you don't see on other shows".

The Hageman Brothers were presented with the basic concepts and characters for the show, such as the ninja, dragons and spinjitzu, but developed the characters' motivations and personalities. They decided that the characters were imperfect and were motivated by their relationships. They also decided that Kai needed to be the main character of the Pilot Episodes because the special was limited to 44 minutes, so they agreed to centre the story around one character, rather than a large ensemble cast, and to give Kai a specific motivation. For this reason, the Hageman Brothers came up with the character of Nya, the main female character in the story. Kevin Hageman explained, "We wanted this to be a show that boys and girls like, and I wanted strong, young female characters in it - so we created Nya". Tommy Andreasen explained that the character of Nya was employed as an emotional reason for Kai to get involved because, "he didn't want to be a ninja, but his sister was kidnapped by this evil Lord from the underworld".

The character of Lloyd Garmadon was conceived by Dan and Kevin Hageman. Andreasen stated, "The Hagemans came up with the idea of Lloyd, the son of Garmadon. As soon as they introduced that idea, we knew Lloyd was going to be the Green Ninja and we were going to build that mystery up over 10 episodes".

The Hageman Brothers eventually left the show after nine seasons when Bragi Schut took over as writer. Kevin Hageman asked Bragi Schut to become involved in the series due to his background of working in film. Despite not having any prior knowledge of Ninjago, Schut became familiar with the story and continued it with the same approach as the Hageman Brothers, ensuring that it included "a combination of humour, heart and adventure".

=== Animation and format ===
The first ten seasons were produced in Copenhagen, Denmark, by the animation studio Wil Film ApS. Erik Wilstrup, the CEO of Wil Film, first became aware of the project in October 2009 when The Lego Group was exploring ways to create branded entertainment using animation. Wilstrup and his team proposed a variety of animation styles before agreeing that computer-generated imagery (CGI) was the best option. Wilstrup elaborated further on the production of the series by describing Wil Film as "a spider in the middle of a wide web and a responsible driver of it all". He explained, "Specifically we have a team of designers in Berlin, while the voice recordings sit with BLT in Canada. The score is produced by Jam Hollywood in Los Angeles, the animation is done at GDC in China and all preproduction, storyboarding, blocking, post-sound, on-line and grading is done in our studio in Copenhagen." Due to quality concerns with their vendor Global Digital Creations during the making of season 7, Wil Film ApS contracted Xentrix Studios for animation from seasons 8 through 10.

The production was relocated to WildBrain Studios in Canada for the last five seasons. This marked the use of new animation styles, including anime-style 2D animation, as a way to experiment with the storyline and add new creativity to the show. With the release of Secrets of the Forbidden Spinjitzu, the run-time for the show was revised from 22 minutes to 11 minutes. This was a particular cause of concern with fans of the show. Tommy Andreasen commented on the 11-minute format by stating, "it was a way for the broadcasters to make it easier to programme". He has also remarked on the positive nature of the new runtime, stating, "Once you're working with 11 minutes it's not just the same idea stretched over two 11s. Now it's a new idea in every episode, and it really makes you risky and fresh - and able to tell stories very efficiently...If there's something I would like Ninjago TV show to be, it's this creative playground, where you should never know exactly what you can expect".

=== Character design ===
Following the initial concept sketch created by Tommy Andreasen in late 2009, concept artwork depicting the main ninja characters was created in 2010, with a character drawing of Lloyd and sketches to summarise the first two Ninjago seasons. In addition, sketches of Nya were first produced by Tim Ainley, depicting the character as a samurai, followed by character, model and part designs.

In the eighth season, the appearances of Lloyd and the ninja were noticeably different from their appearances in previous seasons. Sons of Garmadon implemented a new phase for the ninjas' designs, which were now based on the designs of their movie counterparts in The Lego Ninjago Movie. The design change aimed to help new fans of the movie transition to the television series. The start of the season marked updated appearances for each of the main characters, including changes to their hair and faces, and these new appearances have continued to be used throughout subsequent seasons. Although Lloyd looks almost identical to his movie design, he was given a new voice actor Sam Vincent, who took over the role from Jillian Michaels, while the other ninja retained their original voice actors. Design Manager, Michael Svane Knap explained that these changes were inspired by the movie in terms of the detail level. He commented, "We pulled in some of the character designs from the movie into the TV show afterwards. That was born of wanting to get more uniqueness to the characters. Something that added a lot of character to these ninja that we didn't have before were the hairstyles for them, so we managed to create something that was completely unique for Ninjago with how the characters looked".

=== Music ===
The title sequences for seasons 1–7, 11–13, and 15 feature The Weekend Whip, a song performed by The Fold, which is the show's official theme song. The Weekend Whip was remixed each season to reflect the theme. Seasons 8–10 and The Island–season 14 feature music by composers Michael Kramer and Jay Vincent, with Ninjago Overture as the main theme.

Jay Vincent and Michael Kramer scored the soundtrack for the series since the beginning of the show. Michael Kramer had previously created a martial arts track that Vincent and Kramer decided was perfect for the show and this music piece Ninjago Overture was chosen as the main theme for the show. Although they were initially hired to write some original music for the characters, they decided to score the entire pilot special. The music plays a significant role in the storytelling, particularly in terms of helping viewers to distinguish between the heroes and villains. Kramer explained that there were ground rules that were established from the beginning of the show, stating, "One thing that we try to stick to, not always but generally speaking, is that bad guys usually have more bowed instruments and good guys usually have more wind instruments. The idea of friction being more bowed or struck instruments". The music is also used to underpin the drama in the show. Kramer remarked on this stating, "These characters are real for us. That allows us as composers to really dive deep into that drama. And I mean, it gets really heavy - especially in Season 10 with the Oni - it got really dark, really dramatic". The soundtrack incorporates a wide variety of traditional musical instruments from around the world, which were carefully chosen to illustrate each character or land in which the season is set. Jay Vincent commented that, "because Ninjago is set in this vast universe, we get to respectfully but enjoyably explore other cultures of the world that we might not be familiar with".

The Fold became involved in the show through Jam, a music production company in Copenhagen. The producers wanted to include modern concepts within the show, so they were looking for a catchy pop song. After being initially approached by Michael Kramer, The Fold came up with The Weekend Whip, which was designed to be listened to outside the context of the show and was described as "the dance that the ninja do on the weekend when they are off". The demo was included in the pilot season and recorded in studio a year later.

In January 2021, The Lego Group released a soundtrack video on YouTube titled Ninjago: A Musical Journey, which celebrates the music of the show in four parts. The complete Ninjago: A Musical Journey (2011–2020) video was released on the Lego YouTube channel on 6 June 2021, comprising 2.5 hours of music and images.

== Release ==
=== Launch ===
The Lego Group launched Ninjago: Masters of Spinjitzu in January 2011 with the release of two 22-minute animated specials that aired on Cartoon Network in January and March. These pilots introduced the main characters and the Ninjago universe to its target audience. Following the success of the pilots, The Lego Group announced the release of the first season on 23 March 2011, titled Rise of the Snakes, which aired at the end of 2011 and consists of 13 episodes. The series continued to be written by Dan and Kevin Hageman. Jill Wilfert, Vice President of licensing & entertainment at The Lego Group commented, "We're thrilled to be working with Wil Film and Kevin and Dan Hageman to add yet another dimension of story and engagement to our newest original property".

=== Suspension and continuation ===
The Ninjago: Masters of Spinjitzu series and accompanying product line had originally been planned as a three-year project. The conclusion of the second season titled Legacy of the Green Ninja emphasized the end of the show in its season finale, with the character of Lloyd becoming the "Golden Ninja" and defeating the main antagonist, the Overlord, in an epic battle of light and darkness. However, due to the incredible sales performance of the Lego Ninjago product line, the series was continued. Senior Creative Director Simon Lucas recalled the company's decision to extend the series, stating, "we had six weeks to say what we would do with Ninjago. How do you bring it back? We had the final battle in the story. Immediately I connected with Kevin and Dan Hageman, and we just agreed that this world we'd created, the characters and the story had so much more to give. We actually struggled to filter ideas, because we had so many". The continuation of the series allowed the writers to open up their ideas about what the theme could be. It also pushed them to change the Ninjago series each year, which contributed to the success of the show. Kevin Hageman opined, "If we just kept doing the original theme and just had different adventures... Ninjago would not still be here today. I think it's truly here because the restrictions forced us and Lego to keep redesigning and rethinking Ninjago and it kept becoming this beautiful big universe where anything is possible".

=== Broadcast ===
In the United States, the two pilot episodes of Ninjago: Masters of Spinjitzu, later split into four episodes total, were shown on Cartoon Network on January 14, 2011. They were released in Europe on January 24, 2011. The pilot episodes follow the four original ninja as Sensei Wu brings them together to defeat the evil Lord Garmadon. Due to the popularity of the pilot episodes, the first season was launched from 2 December 2011 to April 2012 alongside a new line of sets marketed as "Rise of the Snakes". The pilot episodes were released on DVD in March 2011, and the first season became available on DVD in Region 1 on June 26, 2012. The series as a whole has an estimated budget of kr 37 million (approximately £4.6 million or US$6.7 million).

It aired on various Cartoon Network feeds internationally. In the United States, it aired on Cartoon Network until 2020, when premieres moved to Netflix. In Australia, it airs on ABC3 and ABC Me.

Season 1, Rise of the Snakes follows the four original ninja as they battle the Serpentine, unlock their "true potential", and attempt to discover the identity of the fabled Green Ninja. The first five episodes of season 1 aired in Canada on November 25 and the first two in the United States on December 2. The season once again aired in Canada and the United States from January 11, 2012, to April 11, 2012.

Season 2, Legacy of the Green Ninja premiered on July 18, 2012, to an audience of 2.8 million. Season 2 focuses on Lloyd, as he trains to become the Green Ninja in preparation for the final battle, where he will have to face and defeat his father.

Season 3, Rebooted premiered on January 29, 2014. Season 3 focuses on Zane as he and the other Ninja fight to defeat an ancient evil reborn as a new, technological threat. In the United Kingdom, the series premiered on 21 July 2014 on Cartoon Network.

Season 4, Tournament of Elements premiered on February 23, 2015, in North America and Great Britain on Cartoon Network. Season 4 follows the ninja as they travel to a mysterious island to fight in the Tournament of Elements and search for a missing Zane. Season 4 also mainly focuses on Kai and introduces Skylor.

Season 5, Possession premiered on June 27, 2015, in the United States. The Lego Group released the trailer for the fifth season on June 8, 2015 . Season 5 focuses on Nya training to become the Master of Water while the other ninja battle Wu's first student, Morro, a vengeful ghost who has possessed Lloyd.

Season 6, Skybound was released on June 8, 2016. It focuses on Jay as he and the ninja try to prevent Nadakhan the Djinn and his Sky Pirates from terraforming Ninjago into a new Kingdom of Djinjago.

A Halloween special titled Day of the Departed was released on October 29, 2016, featuring the return of many of the series' past villains. The special focuses on Cole, who is slowing fading from existence.

Season 7, Hands of Time was released in May 2017. The plot focuses on Kai, Nya and their parents, with the main villains being the Elemental Masters of Time (Acronix and Krux) and their army of Vermillion Warriors, who are trying to rewrite history.

Season 8, Sons of Garmadon was released April 16, 2018 in the United States. It follows the ninja as they try to prevent a criminal organization called the Sons of Garmadon (SoG) from resurrecting Garmadon using the three Oni Masks. The season introduced character redesigns to make the main characters resemble their The Lego Ninjago Movie counterparts.

Season 9, Hunted premiered on June 30, 2018, in Australia. The season follows Lloyd and the Resistance fighting to take back New Ninjago City, while the other ninja try to escape from the First Realm.

Season 10, March of the Oni premiered on April 19, 2019. It follows Garmadon and the ninja as they try to stop a demonic force of darkness called the Oni from destroying Ninjago and the sixteen realms. It featured only four episodes and is the shortest season to date.

Season 11, Secrets of the Forbidden Spinjitzu, premiered on June 22, 2019. It follows the ninja as they come face to face with an enemy from Wu's past, then try to rescue Zane from a dark and mysterious Ice Emperor. The season saw the introduction of an 11-minute episode format and a new, more stylized animation style. It was split into two fifteen-episode parts, The Fire Chapter and The Ice Chapter.

Season 12, Prime Empire premiered on July 19, 2020, in the United States. It focuses on Jay as he and the ninja enter the video game Prime Empire to face the misunderstood Unagami.

Season 13, Master of the Mountain premiered on September 16, 2020, in the United States. It focuses on Cole as he and the ninja journey to the distant mountains of Shintaro, unaware of the sinister secrets that lie in the cavernous dungeons below.

A four-episode miniseries titled The Island premiered on February 27, 2021, in France, and on March 7 in Canada of the same year. It follows the ninja as they embark on a rescue mission to a mysterious and uncharted island.

Season 14, Seabound premiered on April 4, 2021, in Canada on Teletoon. In the United States, the episodes have not yet aired on Cartoon Network, however the LEGO channel on YouTube currently has the episodes. Seabound was also released on Netflix on November 19 of the same year. Its plot centres around the water ninja, Nya, after she loses control over her elemental powers and journeys into the oceans surrounding the island of Ninjago.

Season 15, Crystalized premiered on the official Lego YouTube channel on May 20, 2022 in North America. The season involves the ninja encountering a new group of ninja and being locked up in Kryptarium Prison alongside their old enemies.

== Home media ==
Name	Ninjago: Masters of Spinjitzu Release Date			
Name	US		UK	
Pilot episodes	27 March 2012		2 June 2014	
Rise of the Snakes	26 June 2012	23 June 2015	16 February 2015	2 November 2015
Legacy of the Green Ninja	5 March 2013	23 June 2015	31 August 2015	2 November 2015
Rebooted	5 August 2014		15 August 2016	
Tournament of Elements	21 July 2015		7 November 2016	
Possession	16 February 2016		27 March 2017	
Skybound	14 March 2017		17 July 2017	
Day of the Departed	7 February 2017		22 January 2018	
Hands of Time	3 October 2017		2 October 2017	
Sons of Garmadon	8 January 2019		1 January 2019	
Hunted	N/A		N/A	
March of the Oni	N/A		N/A	

== Reception ==
=== Critical reception ===
Ninjago has received largely favourable reviews from critics. Reviewer Lien Murakami for Common Sense Media gave the Pilot season a three out of five star rating, describing it as "exciting and funny" and noting that "the ninja characters learn lessons of patience and teamwork from their wise sensei". However, the review also opined that the show "is essentially an extended advertisement for the Lego Ninjago toy line". Melissa Camacho for Common Sense Media gave Tournament of Elements a three-star rating and commented on the "positive messages" and "character strengths" in the series stating, "Lessons about loyalty, loss, sacrifice, and teamwork are emphasized throughout." Possession also received a three-star rating from Common Sense Media, and reviewer Melissa Camacho commented, "loyalty, teamwork and sacrifice are common themes, making this a solid choice for action lovers. The loss of a loved one also is a central theme in this series installment." Dave Trumbore for Collider commented on Skybound, giving the show a four-star rating and stating that it is "a fun romp through the mythology in the modern era that emphasizes teamwork, cooperation, and loyalty throughout, all while providing a highly entertaining and action-packed series". Skybound also received a three-star rating from Common Sense Media, which noted that the season, "contains some positive messages about friendship, patience, loyalty, and gender equality." Common Sense Media gave Hands of Time a three-star rating, with Melissa Camacho commenting that the season had good messages, fantasy violence and, "some fun moments, especially when the teens banter with one another. But central to the show is their effort to help Ninjago, a well as their master, by using their powers accordingly." Camacho also gave Hunted a three-star rating and commented, "they're a loyal team and do what they believe is right in order to ensure that good triumphs over evil. If you're a Lego Ninjago fan, Hunted won't disappoint." Barry Hertz for The Globe and Mail commented, "Ninjago is a 10-season-long commercial for one of the world's most expensive toy-lines. Yet, its crass existence is consistently and miraculously outweighed by the imagination of and creative powers behind the long-running series. Ninjago: Masters of Spinjitzu should be terrible, but it is instead one of the more enjoyably complex and mythology-heavy series out there - no matter whether you're the babysitter or the babysat."

In The Encyclopedia of Science Fiction, the show is described as occupying an intermediate position between animated children SF TV and long-form franchise-driven speculative fiction. SFE notes that the shows complex narrative mythology unusual for toy-linked children's animation, and that the show functions as a Western CGI analogue to the shōnen-Wuxia battle format, adapting its structures for a younger audience while maintaining serialized narrative development across multiple seasons.

=== Ratings ===
The Ninjago series achieved immediate success with its target audience and maintained strong ratings from its initial launch. The Pilot Episodes, which were released on Cartoon Network, were the highest rated program with boys in their time slot across multiple airings. The first season of Ninjago: Masters of Spinjitzu achieved the top position on Wednesday nights from 7 to 9 pm with children aged 2–11 and 9–14. The Season 2 premiere scored the top telecast of the day with children aged 2–11, boys aged 2–11, boys aged 6–11 and boys aged 9–14 and ranked the highest in its time period among children aged 6–11 and children aged 9–14. It also increased average ratings from between 124% and 184% compared to the same time period for the first-season premiere in the previous year. The total number of viewers increased by 30%. The third season averaged a triple digit viewer increase with children and boys, with the January 2014 release ranking as the top telecast of the year with boys aged 2–11 and boys aged 6–11. In 2015, the fourth season titled Tournament of Elements maintained its popularity by achieving the top position for telecast of the day among boys aged 2–11 and aged 6–11, and the top position in its time period among children aged 2–11, children aged 6–11 and all boys. With the release of Season 5: Possession, the show achieved rank 22 in the top 100 Monday cable originals on 29 June 2015 with 2.05 million viewers. The release of Season 6: Skybound achieved the rank of 28 in the top 150 original cable telecast for 24 March 2016 with 0.98 million viewers. The release of Season 7: The Hands of Time achieved the rank of 77 in the top 150 Monday cable originals on 15 May 2017 with 0.73 million viewers. The release of Season 8: Sons of Garmadon achieved the rank of 109 in the top 150 Monday cable originals on 16 April 2018 with 0.50 million viewers. On 11 August 2018, Season 9: Hunted Part 1 was ranked at 84 in the top 150 original cable telecasts with 0.45 million viewers. Season 9: Hunted Part 2 achieved a rank of 67 on 18 August 2018 with 0.50 million viewers. On 19 April 2019, Season 10: March of the Oni ranked at position 86 with 0.44 million viewers. Ninjago:Secrets of the Forbidden Spinjitzu ranked at position 81 on 22 June 2019 with 0.31 million viewers. Prime Empire ranked at 83 on 19 July 2020 with 0.28 million viewers. On 13 September 2020, the release of Master of the Mountain achieved a rank of 89 in the top 150 original cable telecasts with 0.18 million viewers.

=== Awards and nominations ===
Award	Date of ceremony	Category	Nominee(s)	Result	Ref.
Annie Awards	February 4, 2012	Outstanding Achievement for Directing in an Animated TV/Broadcast Production	Peter Hausner	Nominated	
Annie Awards	January 31, 2015	Outstanding Achievement for Music in an Animated TV/Broadcast Production	Jay Vincent, Michael Kramer, Jeppe Riddervold, and Erin Chapman	Nominated	
BMI Film & TV Awards	May 17, 2012	Cable Music Award	Michael Kramer and Jay Vincent	Won	
BMI Film & TV Awards	May 12, 2016	Cable Television Music Awards	Michael Kramer, Jeppe Riddervold, and Jay Vincent	Won	
Cannes Lions International Festival of Creativity	June 25, 2012	Branded Entertainment – Best Fictional Program, Series or Film	Ninjago: Masters of Spinjitzu	Nominated	
Daytime Creative Arts Emmy Awards	July 26, 2020	Outstanding Music Direction and Composition	Michael Kramer, Jay Vincent, and Jeppe Riddervold	Nominated	
Leo Awards	July 29, 2020	Best Art Direction – Animation Program or Series	Kenny Ng (Episode: "A Rocky Start")	Nominated	
Leo Awards	July 29, 2020	Best Sound – Animation Program or Series	Jeff Davis, Stefan Seslija, Melanie Eng, and Fanny Riguidel (Episode: "A Rocky Start")	Nominated	
Leo Awards	July 8, 2021	Best Art Direction – Animation Series	Kenny Ng (Episode: "Superstar Rockin' Jay"	Won	
Leo Awards	July 8, 2021	Best Direction – Animation Series	Richard Johnson and Daniel Ife (Episode: "The Son of Lilly")	Nominated	
Leo Awards	July 8, 2021	Best Sound – Animation Series	Jeff Davis, Stefan Seslija, and Fanny Riguidel (Episode: "The Speedway Five-Billion")	Nominated	
Leo Awards	July 8, 2021	Best Voice Performance – Animation Series	Brent Miller (Episode: "Ninjago Confidential")	Nominated	
Leo Awards	July 6, 2022	Best Animation Series	Ryan Pears, Pamela Keller, Jill Wilfert, Keith Malone, Tommy Andreasen, Bragi Schut, Asa Tait, Robert May, and Josh Scherba	Nominated	
Leo Awards	July 6, 2022	Best Art Direction – Animation Series	Kenny Ng (Episode: "Nyad")	Won	
Leo Awards	July 6, 2022	Best Direction – Animation Series	Richard Johnson and Shane Poettcker (Episode: "The Turn of the Tide")	Nominated	
Leo Awards	July 6, 2022	Best Sound – Animation Series	Jeff Davis, Stefan Seslija, and Fanny Riguidel (Episode: "Assault on Ninjago City")	Nominated	
Music + Sound Awards	July 12, 2018	Best Sound Design – Television Programme	Sound Design and Foley: Stefan Leissner, Tobias Hellkvist, and Troels Jørgensen; Re-Recording Mix: Reda El-Kheloufi	Nominated	
Nickelodeon Kids' Choice Awards	March 12, 2016	Favorite Cartoon	Ninjago: Masters of Spinjitzu	Nominated	

== Themes and analysis ==
=== Light and dark ===
One of the most dominant aspects of the Ninjago series is the theme of duality, or light and dark (with reference to the yin and yang). In the fictional realm of Ninjago, the two main elements are creation and destruction, which are the definition of good and evil, and are shown to either create life or destroy it. The main characters that have been depicted wielding this power are Master Wu, who represents creation and Lord Garmadon who represents destruction, being the direct descendants of the First Spinjitzu Master, the legendary fictional creator of Ninjago. Many villains throughout the series have been defined by darkness and destruction, most prominently the Oni, while the main character Lloyd Garmadon has been associated with light, particularly when he was shown to have achieved his "Golden Power" in the second season.

=== Teamwork ===
The importance of teamwork has also been a fundamental aspect that runs through the series. Senior Designer Christopher Stamp commented, "The characters are flawed and individually they are not complete, but as a team they complete each other. You follow the characters' development, it allows a form of natural evolution so as you go through the stories. The example I always come back to is when Cole questions if he is really important to the team, would the team still exist if he wasn't there? That led us to introduce ghosts to the world of Ninjago, what if he's a ghost? Then we realize when he actually becomes invisible, the team doesn't function the same way without him."

=== True potential ===
The series presents recurring moral lessons beneath the story that are intended to be absorbed by the viewers. In particular, the main character Master Wu has been depicted repeatedly placing emphasis on overcoming the internal obstacles that can hold a person back from achieving greatness. This theme was also illustrated by the main ninja characters conquering their personal obstacles and achieving their "true potential". Tommy Kalmar, Story and Entertainment Manager commented, "Beneath the icons of dragons and ninjas there's this compelling full narrative around kids gaining confidence, finding their inner voice, learning something new about themselves, realizing something, and suddenly they can do more."

== Influence and legacy ==
From its launch in 2011, the Ninjago series achieved continued popularity amongst its target audience, who are mainly primary aged children and teenagers, but it also gained a dedicated fan community. The Ninjago writers ensured that children are able to relate to the main characters by making them teenage heroes, and this made them consistently popular characters. In 2017, Christopher Stamp, Senior Designer at The Lego Group, noted that Lloyd and the ninja are relatable to children due to their inherent flaws, stating, "What is the main thing that has caught kids' attention? Why is it so relatable? I have thought about it a lot. For me personally, it has got to be the characters. None of the characters are perfect, they are all flawed and I think that is something everyone can relate to."

From 2011 to 2022, the Ninjago series included storylines that aimed to teach about the importance of friendship, inclusivity and confidence. In 2017, Lego design manager, Michael Svane Knap commented, "It's always important to develop good characters that engage with the kids and encourage them to watch. The story that we have been telling from the beginning has been focused on family, collaboration and emotions and these are the keystone for telling a good Ninjago story". The Ninjago series was in continuous production for over a decade, resulting in many children having grown up following the series and developing into adult fans. Knap remarked, "Some have grown up with Lego Ninjago and are now expressing their gratitude and telling us how they have learned lifelong skills".

On 5 February 2019, Ernie Estrella for Syfy Wire remarked that, "Ninjago is one of Lego's long running, home-grown franchises, and is arguably its most successful one."

=== Tenth anniversary ===
On 14 January 2021, the Ninjago series celebrated its tenth anniversary. This milestone reflected the continued popularity of the show amongst its audience. Tommy Andreasen, Senior Manager and co-creator explained, "Originally, the Ninjago theme was supposed to end after season 2 in 2012. It just shows an incredible commitment from our fans that we are still going strong 10 years later". In April 2021 a three-hour documentary produced by four Ninjago fans was released on YouTube, titled Ninjago - Ten Years of Spinjitzu: A Documentary. It recounts ten years of the series and features interviews with Tommy Andreasen, the Hageman Brothers and various voice actors from the show. In June 2021, The Fold released a song titled Ten for Ninjago to celebrate the ten-year anniversary of the show.

== Merchandise ==
The Ninjago TV series was launched to coincide with the release of its product line, Lego Ninjago in January 2011. In its first year, 17 Lego construction toy sets from the product line were released. After that, Ninjago-themed playsets were released each year to correspond with each season of the TV series.

== Mini-movies ==
Several mini-movies have been produced alongside the Ninjago television series, which provide additional information about the characters.

- Pilot season mini-movies – Six short films that take place immediately after the pilot season, released in 2011. Flashbacks also detail Garmadon's banishment and Underworld userpation.
- Chen mini-movies – Five mini-movies that focus on Master Chen and his chair from Season 4, released in 2015
- Tall Tales – Six mini-movies that focus on the origins of the Sky Pirates from Season 6, released in 2016. They're confirmed loosely canon due to lore contradictions, particularly set in the modern century instead of 200 years prior, with only the tales of Flintlock and Doubloon being faithful to the season. Due to technological advancements, the tales of Dogshank and Clancee may be canon.
- Wu's Teas – A collection of 20 Ninjago shorts that focus on Master Wu's tea shop, released in 2017. They're set between Day Of The Departed and Season 7, but are confirmed loosely canon due to some slapstick humor and lore/character inconsistencies.
- Operation: Heavy Metal – Four shorts released in May 2017 on LEGO's YouTube channel, in Chinese. From 2022 to 2023, Tommy Andreasen would release these shorts on Twitter
- Samurai X Rising – A short released on the official Ninjago website in 2017, set between episodes 7 and 8 of season 7
- Happy Birthday To You! – A one-minute Ninjago short, released on Netflix on 14 September 2017. In it, the Ninja deliver a cake to the viewer while fighting the departed supervillains.
- Ninjago: Decoded – A mini-series of ten episodes which takes place between Season 7 and Season 8, released on 27 November 2017. They feature clipshows of flashbacks to past seasons.
- Tales from the Monastery of Spinjitzu – Six Ninjago: Legacy films from the Lego website that take place between Season 9 and Season 10, released 19 December 2018. They flash back to past seasons.
- Prime Empire Original Shorts: Inside the Game – Six Ninjago shorts that provide additional background information about Season 12, released in 2020
- Ninjago: Reimagined – Five Ninjago Legacy shorts in different animation styles, released in 2021 alongside the series' 10th anniversary. Some shorts take place in alternate universes or the future.
- The Virtues of Spinjitzu – Six Ninjago shorts in which Master Wu teaches the ninja about the six fundamental virtues of Spinjitzu by trapping them in a hallucination, released in 2022.
- Will You Enter the Dream World? – Four short films featuring the ninja to promote the Lego Dreamzzz theme, released in 2023

== Film adaptations ==
=== The Lego Ninjago Movie ===
Lloyd Garmadon and the main ninja characters are the protagonists of The Lego Ninjago Movie, which was released in 2017. Although the plot is not directly related to the Ninjago television series, Lloyd retains his role as the Green Ninja and leader of the secret ninja force, battling against the evil Lord Garmadon. Warner Bros. had announced the development of the film in 2013. The film was directed by Charlie Bean, Paul Fisher and Bob Logan, and produced by Dan Lin, Roy Lee, Phil Lord and Christopher Miller. The original writers for the Ninjago television series, Dan and Kevin Hageman, were also writers for the film. The cast included Dave Franco as Lloyd, Jackie Chan as Master Wu and Justin Theroux as Lord Garmadon. The plot involves the main ninja characters battling against the main antagonist of the film, the evil warlord Lord Garmadon.

=== Live action film ===
In October 2024, it was announced that a live action Ninjago film from Universal Pictures is in development, with Dan and Kevin Hageman attached to pen the script. At the L.A. Comic Con 2026, the Hageman brothers confirmed that they had finished a script for the film but that it had yet to be greenlit.

== Other media ==
In addition to the Ninjago television series and The Lego Ninjago Movie, the ninja characters have appeared in magazines, video games, colouring books, graphic novels, children's books and theme park attractions.

=== Theme park attractions ===
The ninja and Master Wu appear in an interactive theme park ride called Lego Ninjago The Ride at Legoland.

Lloyd, the ninja and Master Wu appear in a 4D short animated film entitled Lego Ninjago: Master of the 4th Dimension, released in Legoland on 18 January 2018. The film can be experienced by visitors in all Legoland theme parks except Legoland New York. The plot focuses on Master Wu teaching the ninja a lesson about the Scroll of the 4th Dimension, which affects gravity and organised matter.

=== Publications ===
Since the beginning of 2012, a 36-page Lego Ninjago Magazine has been released in the UK and the Netherlands every month. It contains a comic strip as well as various facts, puzzles, posters, competitions and other activities. Each edition also includes a free Lego gift which is often a minifigure of Lloyd, one of the ninja, or a villain from the series.

Various accompanying books to the series have been produced that feature Lloyd and the ninja. A total of 12 graphic novels have been published, written by Greg Farshtey.

=== Video games and apps ===
The ninja appear as playable characters in a wide variety of video games and mobile games, including Lego Battles: Ninjago (2011), Lego Universe (2011), Lego Ninjago: Nindroids (2014), Lego Ninjago: Shadow of Ronin (2015), Lego Ninjago: Tournament (2015), Lego Dimensions (2015), Lego Worlds (2017), The Lego Ninjago Movie Video Game (2017), Lego Brawls (2019), Lego Legacy: Heroes Unboxed (2020), and Lego Party (2025).

=== Online media ===
On 24 August 2020, The Lego Group released a short film on the Lego YouTube channel titled Lego Ninjago Explained - Everything You Need to Know about Lego Ninjago. The film offers a humorous account of the series in the style of Honest Trailers.

On 28 May 2021, Lego Life launched the first episode of Ninja Vlogs, a video series aimed at children aged six to 12 years old. The vlog was hosted by the Ninjago characters Jay and Nya and was the first time that The Lego Group used motion capture and real-time rendering in media content.

== See also ==
- The Lego Ninjago Movie
- Lego Ninjago (video game franchise)
- The Fold
