= Ninjago: Day of the Departed =

Danish animated television special

- Day of the Departed poster
- Starring: Jillian Michaels; Vincent Tong; Michael Adamthwaite; Brent Miller; Kirby Morrow; Kelly Metzger; Paul Dobson; Jennifer Hayward; Kathleen Barr
- No. of episodes: 1

Release
- Original network: Cartoon Network
- Original release: October 29, 2016

Season chronology
- ← Previous; Skybound Next → Hands of Time

Day of the Departed is a television special of the animated television series Ninjago: Masters of Spinjitzu (titled Ninjago from the eleventh season onward). The series was created by Michael Hegner and Tommy Andreasen. The special aired on October 29, 2016 to coincide with Halloween and follows the sixth season titled Skybound. It is succeeded by the seventh season, titled Hands of Time.

The 44-minute Halloween special replaced the release of a second season for 2016, due to the ongoing development of The Lego Ninjago Movie, which was released in 2017. The special focuses on the events of the Day of the Departed, a national holiday celebrated in Ninjago in which loved ones are remembered. The storyline focuses on the ninja character Cole, who becomes concerned about fading away in his ghostly form, and his battle with the main antagonist Master Yang. While Cole is trapped in Yang's temple, the ninja must battle several spirits of villains from their past that he has accidentally released.

== Voice cast ==
=== Main ===
- Jillian Michaels as Lloyd Garmadon, the Green Ninja and Elemental Master of Energy
- Vincent Tong as Kai, the Red Ninja and Elemental Master of Fire
- Michael Adamthwaite as Jay, the Blue Ninja and Elemental Master of Lightning
- Brent Miller as Zane, the Titanium Ninja and Elemental Master of Ice
- Kirby Morrow as Cole, the Black Ninja and Elemental Master of Earth
- Kelly Metzger as Nya, the Light Blue Ninja, Elemental Master of Water and Kai's younger sister
- Paul Dobson as Sensei Wu, the wise teacher of the ninja
- Jennifer Hayward as P.I.X.A.L., a female nindroid
- Kathleen Barr as Misako

=== Recurring ===
- Ian James Corlett as Master Chen
- Michael Daingerfield as Dr. Saunders
- Brian Dobson as Ronin
- Michael Dobson as Pythor
- Paul Dobson as General Kozu
- Michael Donovan as Sensei Yang
- Andrew Francis as Morro
- Michael Kopsa as Samukai
- Richard Newman as General Cryptor
- Alan Marriott as Dareth
- Jillian Michaels as Edna
- Colin Murdock as Ed
- Kirby Morrow as Lou

== Release ==
A trailer for Day of the Departed made its debut at the Lego Ninjago panel at San Diego Comic-Con in July 2016. The trailer was later released on the Lego YouTube channel in August 2016. Day of the Departed premiered on Cartoon Network on October 29, 2016.

== Plot ==
Day of the Departed was a Halloween TV special that takes place between Season 6 and Season 7. The Day of the Departed is a sacred holiday that is celebrated by the people of Ninjago to commemorate their fallen ancestors and friends. On this day, the ninja split up to remember their ancestors and spend time with family members. During a visit to Ninjago History Museum, Cole (who is still a ghost) realizes that he is starting to fade away and after discovering the Yin Blade, decides to visit the floating Temple of Airjitzu to confront the ghost of Master Yang.

At the temple, Cole accidentally uses the Yin Blade to open a portal to the Departed Realm, thereby releasing the spirits of the ninjas' old enemies, which include Samukai, Kozu, Cryptor, Chen and Morro, who are also joined by Pythor. The spirits possess their mannequins in Ninjago History Museum, which brings them to life. Cole is detained at the temple by Yang's ghost students. Yang then tells the villains that they can stay in Ninjago if they defeat each of the ninja that defeated them. Yang seizes the Yin Blade from Cole and explains that he intends to use the blade to tear open the Rift of Return, so that he can be revived. The ninja are under attack from their old revived enemies, but successfully defeat them one by one. In the meantime, Cole is forced to fight Yang's students as he follows Yang up to the temple roof. Yang uses Airjitzu in an attempt to reach the Rift, but Cole stops him and they fight.

When the ninja are reunited, they realize that they had almost forgotten about Cole. They return to the Temple of Airjitzu as Cole is battling Yang. Cole's spirit is bolstered at the sight of his friends and he shatters the Yin Blade. This frees Yang's students, who are able to cross through the Rift and become human again. Yang tells Cole that he wanted to be remembered, but Cole replies that he will be remembered as the creator of Airjitzu. They agree to cross through the Rift together, but during the ascent, Yang decides to stay at the temple to settle his debts and launches Cole into the Rift. The ninja soon discover that Cole has returned, now become human. They celebrate the return of their friend and decide to use the Temple of Airjitzu as their new base.

== Episodes ==
An alternate version of the episode was released on January 31, 2017, for China. While it mostly focuses on the same plot, there are some differences that set it apart from the English version.

Title	Directed by	Written by	Original release date
"Day of the Departed"	Peter Hausner	David Shayne	October 29, 2016
On the Day of the Departed, Cole realizes his ghostly form is fading away, so he goes to Yang's Temple, but accidentally opens a passage to the Departed Realm, reviving the Ninja's old enemies (Samukai, Kozu, Cryptor, Chen, and Morro) via mannequins in the Hall of Villainy, who are joined by Pythor. Yang orders the villains to go after the Ninja and curse them to take their place in the Departed Realm. Cole finds that Yang is trying to resurrect himself using the Rift of Return. Morro, instead of fighting Wu, warns him of Yang's plan. The Ninja defeat their adversaries, reunite and set off to Yang's temple. Yang tells Cole he wanted to be immortal so he wouldn't be forgotten, but Cole assures Yang he'll be remembered as the creator of Airjitzu. Cole crosses through the rift and becomes human, but the rift almost closes the moment he crosses through it, giving him a ghostly green scar on his face.

== Critical reception ==
Netflix gave Day of the Departed a 7.7 out of 10 rating.
