= Ninjago: Skybound =

Danish animated television season

- Season 6
- Skybound poster
- Starring: Jillian Michaels; Vincent Tong; Michael Adamthwaite; Brent Miller; Kirby Morrow; Kelly Metzger; Paul Dobson; Kathleen Barr; Scott McNeil
- No. of episodes: 10

Release
- Original network: Cartoon Network
- Original release: March 24 – July 15, 2016

Season chronology
- ← Previous; Possession Next → Day of the Departed

Skybound is the sixth season of the animated television series Ninjago: Masters of Spinjitzu (titled Ninjago from the eleventh season onward). The series was created by Michael Hegner and Tommy Andreasen. The season aired from March 24 to July 15, 2016, following the fifth season titled Possession. It is succeeded by the television special Day of the Departed.

The sixth season introduces the Djinn pirate Nadakhan and his crew of sky pirates as the main antagonists of the season. It follows the storyline of Nadakhan tricking each of the ninja characters by granting them three wishes and trapping their souls until only Jay and Nya are remaining.

== Voice cast ==
=== Main ===
- Jillian Michaels as Lloyd Garmadon, the Green Ninja and the Elemental Master of Energy
- Vincent Tong as Kai, the Red Ninja and Elemental Master of Fire
- Michael Adamthwaite as Jay, the Blue Ninja and Elemental Master of Lightning
- Brent Miller as Zane, the Titanium Ninja and Elemental Master of Ice
- Kirby Morrow as Cole, the Black Ninja and Elemental Master of Earth
- Kelly Metzger as Nya, the Light Blue Ninja, Elemental Master of Water and Kai's sister
- Paul Dobson as Sensei Wu, the wise teacher of the ninja
- Kathleen Barr as Misako
- Scott McNeil as Nadakhan

=== Supporting ===
- Jennifer Hayward as P.I.X.A.L., a female nindroid
- Paul Dobson as Flintlocke
- Vincent Tong as Doubloon
- Nicole Oliver as Dogshank
- Ian James Corlett as Clancee
- Michael Adamthwaite as Squiffy
- Brian Dobson as Bucko
- Ian James Corlett as Monkey Wretch
- Scott McNeil as Clouse
- Brent Miller as Squiffy
- Heather Doerksen as Skylor
- Alan Marriott as Captain Soto

== Production ==
=== Animation ===
The animation for the sixth season was produced at Wil Film ApS in Denmark.

=== Direction ===
The episodes for the sixth season were directed by Peter Hausner, Michael Helmuth Hansen and Jens Møller.

=== Music ===
The season was accompanied by the release of a remixed version of The Weekend Whip, the show's official theme song, which is performed by The Fold. The remixed song is titled The Pirate Whip.

== Release ==
A video clip providing a first look at the season was shown at the Lego Ninjago panel at San Diego Comic-Con in 2015, which was later released online on the Lego YouTube channel. The Lego Group teased the storyline for the season on November 5, 2015 with the release of the first official poster that depicted the character Jay battling against the season's antagonists, Nadakhan and his crew of sky pirates. An official trailer for the season was released on the Lego YouTube channel on January 7, 2016. The season premiered on Cartoon Network on March 24, 2016. The rest of the season was released throughout June and July 2016, with the season finale titled The Way Back being released on July 15 of the same year.

== Plot ==
Clouse (who is now a ghost escaped from the Cursed Realm) finds the Teapot of Tyrahn and frees the evil Djinn or Genie Nadakhan. He grants Clouse three wishes, traps him inside the teapot, and then searches for the Realm Crystal to reunite his crew of sky pirates. When he discovers that the ninja are protecting it, he frames them for various crimes, which results in them becoming wanted criminals. The ninja split up to escape but Nadakhan imprisons Wu and Misako in the teapot. (Note: Ninjago, Season 6, Episode 1 "Infamous") Nadakhan finds the Realm Crystal in the Hiroshi Labyrinth Stronghold. In Kryptarium Prison, the ninja meet Captain Soto, who explains that they must use a drop of Tiger Widow venom to weaken Nadakhan, so they head for the location of the last Tiger Widow spider. Nadakhan frees his crew from across the Sixteen Realms and they repair the Misfortune's Keep. They visit his home realm and kingdom, Djinjago and discover that it is deteriorating, caused by the ninja destroying the Cursed Realm. Khanjkhan gives Nadakhan the Djinn Blade, which Nadakhan uses to slash the Teapot of Tyrahn, causing the souls of Clouse, Wu and Misako to transfer into the sword. He returns to Ninjago and swears revenge on the ninja. (Note: Ninjago, Season 6, Episode 3 "Enkrypted")

Nadakhan tricks Jay into making his first wish. To impress Nya, Jay wishes he was rich and was never born in a junkyard and, as a result, discovers that he was adopted and that his real father is Cliff Gordon, a famous actor. Nadakhan then traps Kai and Zane in his sword. He begins his plan to create New Djinjago by raising pieces of Ninjago into the sky. (Note: Ninjago, Season 6, Episode 4 "Misfortune Rising") The ninja reach Tiger Widow Island and Jay extracts the venom. He is imprisoned on Misfortune's Keep. (Note: Ninjago, Season 6, Episode 5 "On a Wish and a Prayer") Nadakhan reveals his plan to wed Nya (who resembles his lost love Delara), which will give him the power of infinite wishes. Lloyd, Jay, Cole and Nya are captured by the sky pirates and they waste their remaining wishes in combat, aside from Jay, who still has one wish remaining. Nadakhan traps Lloyd and Cole inside the sword, leaving only Jay and Nya, who escape by creating a fusion dragon of water and lightning. (Note: Ninjago, Season 6, Episode 7 "Wishmasters") In their last stand against the sky pirates, Nya pushes Jay into a portal and is captured. (Note: Ninjago, Season 6, Episode 8 "The Last Resort")

Jay gathers allies and they reach New Djinjago on a rising piece of land. He obtains the Djinn Blade and is struck with it to be transported into the blade to release the Ninja, Wu and Misako. (Note: Ninjago, Season 6, Episode 9 "Operation Land Ho!") Meanwhile, the wedding ceremony is completed and Nadakhan becomes all powerful with the ability of infinite wishes. In the ensuing battle, Flintlocke shoots Nadakhan with the venom, but Nya is also hit and dies in Jay's arms. Heartbroken, Jay makes a final wish that the Teapot of Tyrahn had never been found. As a result, Nadakhan is forced to grant Jay his final wish before he dies, which causes the entire season's events to be reversed. Only Jay and Nya remember these events and they embrace. In this timeline, Clouse still finds the teapot, but is chased away by locals, ensuring that Nadakhan is never released again. (Note: Ninjago, Season 6, Episode 10 "The Way Back")

== Episodes ==
No. overall	No. in season	Title	Directed by	Written by	Original release date	U.S. viewers (millions)
55	1	"Infamous"	Peter Hausner	The Hageman Brothers	March 24, 2016	0.98
The Ninja become celebrities following the destruction of the Cursed Realm. Yet, amid their newfound popularity, a new threat arises when a survivor of the Cursed Realm's destruction, Clouse, reapears. The Ninja attempt to stop him, but they are held up and arrive too late to stop him. In Stiix, Clouse finds the ancient Teapot of Tyrahn and releases Nadakhan the Djinn, who manipulates him into wishing for himself to be trapped in the teapot. Upon arriving to Stiix, the Ninja discover that they have been framed for a series of crimes and are pursued by the city's inhabitants. Nadakhan learns of the fate of his crew of Sky Pirates and captures Sensei Wu using the same tricks he used on Clouse.
56	2	"Public Enemy Number One"	Michael Helmuth Hansen	The Hageman Brothers	June 16, 2016	1.01
Ronin offers to capture the Ninja in exchange for a 'clean slate', while Misako is captured by Nadakhan. The Ninja separate into pairs so that they can't all be arrested. At the library, Ronin hacks into Zane's system, shutting him down, and also captures Lloyd. Kai and Nya end up being captured by Ronin as well, followed by Jay and Cole. The Ninja are taken to Kryptarium prison. Meanwhile, Nadakhan steals the Realm Crystal from Cyrus Borg's vault located in Hiroshi's labyrinth.
57	3	"Enkrypted"	Jens Møller	The Hageman Brothers	June 23, 2016	1.17
Nadakhan uses the Realm Crystal to bring back five members of his crew from other realms: Flintlocke, Clancee, Doubloon, Monkey Wretch, and Dogshank. They travel to Djinnjago, Nadakhan's home realm, only to learn that the realm is collapsing as a result of the Ninjas' destruction of the Cursed Realm. Nadakhan takes the Djinn Blade from his father and swears to avenge his people. In Kryptarium, the Ninja encounter some old enemies like Captain Soto and hardened criminals like the Mechanic, who wants to use Zane for spare parts. Soto reveals that he was the one who trapped Nadakhan inside the Teapot of Tyrahn, after first using Tiger Widow venom to weaken him. The Ninja break out of prison with Soto's help.
58	4	"Misfortune Rising"	Peter Hausner	The Hageman Brothers	June 30, 2016	1.31
Nadakhan visits Jay and manipulates him into using one of his three wishes. Jay who wants to rekindle his relationship with Nya, wishes to be richer. Nadakhan reveals to Jay that he was adopted and helps him access his inheritance from his late biological father Cliff Gordon, who turns out to be a famous actor. The Sky Pirates attack the city to steal bits of land, which Nadakhan intends to use to build a new Djinn kingdom. The Ninja try to stop them, but Kai gets captured by Nadakhan. The Ninja recover a lantern from Nadakhan's ship, the Misfortune's Keep, which contains a map to the lair of the Tiger Widow.
59	5	"On a Wish and a Prayer"	Michael Helmuth Hansen	The Hageman Brothers	July 11, 2016	1.15
As the Ninja are sailing to the island on the map, Nadakhan confronts Zane below deck. Zane attempts to use his wishes against Nadakhan, by first wishing for him to be unable to exploit loopholes in his wishes, but still gets tricked into getting caught. On the island, the Ninja learn that Jay used two of his wishes without telling them. Nya, angry with Jay, forces him to retrieve the Tiger Widow Venom alone. Nadakhan and his sky pirates ambush the Ninja, and the djinn takes the canister of venom from Jay, emptying out its contents. Jay is taken to the Misfortune's Keep, but Nya reveals that Nadakhan emptied out the wrong canister.
60	6	"My Dinner With Nadakhan"	Jens Møller	The Hageman Brothers	July 12, 2016	1.17
Nadakhan tries to break Jay's will to make him wish himself away like the Djinn's previous victims. He also reveals to Jay if Djinn royalty get married on Djinn Land, the Djinn Law will allow them to grant their own wishes, without restrictions. Jay tries to convince Flintlocke that Nadakhan is only using him and the other pirates and at first, the pirates appear to believe him and help him escape and steal the Djinn Blade, but this turns out to be yet another one of Nadakhan's mind-games. Meanwhile, Ronin and the Police Commissioner rescue the Ninjas from Tiger Widow Island, the latter apologizing for distrusting them earlier.
61	7	"Wishmasters"	Peter Hausner	The Hageman Brothers	July 13, 2016	1.11
Jay managed to smuggle out a message to the other Ninja, who come up with a plan to infiltrate the Sky Pirates in an attempt to save Jay and defeat Nadakhan. They build a Raid Zeppelin, using a blueprint that Jay wrote his message on, and learn to talk like pirates. The plan fails and the Ninja are captured. Nadakhan invites Nya to a feast and tries to convince her to marry him. The Ninja begin making wishes to turn Nadakhan's powers to their own advantage as the djinn must grant any wish he hears only having the freedom to exploit loopholes in their wording. Cole and Lloyd are trapped in the Djinn Blade, but not before Lloyd, who previously wished to be as wise as his uncle Wu, sends Jay and Nya off into the clouds, telling Jay that he can fix everything with a wish coming from the heart.
62	8	"The Last Resort"	Michael Helmuth Hansen	The Hageman Brothers	July 14, 2016	1.05
Nya and Jay set off to the lighthouse, where they meet Echo Zane, a second Nindroid built by Zane's late father. Nadakhan forces Clancee to wish for Nya's location to be revealed to him, and the Sky Pirates set out to capture them. Nya tells Jay that he needs to wish for Nadakhan to not be a Djinn. The Sky Pirates arrive, and Jay and Nya attempt to use Travellers' Tea, but they only have enough for one of them. Nya tells Jay that since he has the last wish, he needs to remain safe, and pushes him through the portal, while she herself is taken prisoner.
63	9	"Operation Land Ho!"	Jens Møller	The Hageman Brothers	July 15, 2016	1.20
Back in Ninjago City, Jay assembles a team of allies, consisting of Captain Soto, Skylor, the Police Commissioner, Ronin, Echo Zane and Dareth. They head to Nadakhan's floating island, but the Djinn's scouts have warned him of their coming. Nya convinces Nadakhan to drop the Djinn Blade, allowing Jay to grab it and rescue Sensei Wu, Misako, and the other Ninja.
64	10	"The Way Back"	Peter Hausner	The Hageman Brothers	July 15, 2016	1.15
The marriage takes place and Nadakhan has been given the power of infinite wishes. The crew realizes that Nadakhan wants the power all for himself and join forces with the Ninja. Clancee tells Jay where to find the Tiger Widow Venom, which they left on the Misfortune's Keep during their failed infiltration but gets banished along with Doubloon and Monkey Wretch. Jay gives the venom dart to Flintlocke while the Ninja confront Nadakhan and Nya, whom Nadakhan turned into a reincarnation of his true love, Dilara. The Ninja manage to get Nadakhan out in the open, allowing Flintlocke to shoot him. The dart hits Nadakhan but a drop of the venom spills on Nya, killing her. A grieving Jay wishes that the Teapot of Tyrahn was never found in the first place. As it is a wish coming from the heart, the paralyzed Nadakhan grants it in good faith and dies, reversing the events of Skybound, but leaving Jay's and Nya's memories intact. The season ends with Jay and Nya embracing, while Clouse is discovered by the people of Stiix and is prevented from recovering the Teapot.

== Reception ==
=== Ratings ===
On March 24, 2016, the season premier for Skybound aired and achieved rank 28 in the Top 50 Original Cable Telecasts, with 0.98 million viewers.

=== Critical reception ===
Reviewer Melissa Camacho for Common Sense Media gave Skybound a 3 out of 5 star rating and noted that the season "offers lots of adventure and some positive messages." The reviewer also commented, "This entertaining series offers a fun, action-packed story while staying true to the Spinjitzu saga. The teen ninja do what most teenagers do, including engaging in competitive behavior and struggling through (largely innocent) romantic entanglements. But they continue to fight for good while recognizing the importance of honor, teamwork, loyalty, and treating everyone in the group equally, regardless of gender." Dave Trumbore for Collider gave the season a four star rating and opined that it is "a fun romp through the mythology in the modern era that emphasizes teamwork, cooperation, and loyalty throughout, all while providing a highly entertaining and action-packed series". RJ Carter for Critical Blast gave the season a 4 out of 5 rating and commented, "This sixth season of Ninjago has quite a bit of action and high drama in it. Yes, there's still a lot of humor that's at a kid level, but I was surprised by how much more there was to it than that. This was a compelling story that grabs the viewer. If you're a grown-up watching this through - because you've simply got to find out how it ends!"

== Other media ==
An app game titled Lego Ninjago: Skybound was released to accompany the season. It is a side-scrolling platform game for Android devices and web browsers. The plot involves playing as the main ninja character Jay to stop Nadakhan and his Sky Pirates from stealing parts of Ninjago and rebuilding his realm.

Six mini-movies titled Tall Tales that focus on the Sky Pirates were released in February, March and April 2016 on the Lego YouTube channel to accompany the season. The titles of the mini-movies were Tall Tale of Monkey Wretch, The Tall Tale of Flintlocke, The Tall Tale of Clancee, Tall Tale of Dogshank, The Tall Tale of Doubloon and The Tall Tale of Sqiffy & Bucko.

== See also ==
- Lloyd Garmadon
- Lego Ninjago (video game franchise)
