= Brent Miller (actor) =

Canadian actor (born 1974)

- Born: Brent Graeme Miller; October 28, 1974 (age 51); Vancouver, British Columbia, Canada
- Occupation: Actor
- Years active: 1999-present
- Spouse: Nicole Bouma
- Children: 2
- Website: https://www.brentmillervoice.com/

Brent Graeme Miller (born October 28, 1974) is a Canadian actor who works for Ocean Studios and various other studios in Vancouver, British Columbia, Canada. He has played several roles in anime, most notably Sting Oakley in Mobile Suit Gundam SEED Destiny and Hot Shot in Transformers: Armada and Transformers: Energon. Miller is best known for his role as Zane in Lego Ninjago: Masters of Spinjitzu. He has a YouTube channel, which focuses on Ninjago and voice acting.

== Personal life ==
Brent Miller is married to Nicole Bouma and together they have two daughters named Chelsea Miller and Jaeda Lily Miller.

== Filmography ==
=== Film ===
List of voice performances in feature films
| Year | Title | Role | Notes |
|---|---|---|---|
| 2001 | Rudolph the Red-Nosed Reindeer & the Island of Misfit Toys | Hank | Video |
| 2002 | MVP 2: Most Vertical Primate-Behind The Scenes | Jack | Video Documentary Short |
| 2002 | Sabrina: Friends Forever | Hockey Player | |
| 2004 | MXP: Most Xtreme Primate | | Video |
| 2005 | Inspector Gadget's Biggest Caper Ever | Giant Lizard | |
| 2005 | Ark | Cevean Prisoner | |
| 2006 | Spymate | Minkey Walla | |
| 2010 | Mobile Suit Gundam 00: A Wakening of the Trailblazer | Andrei Smirnov | English dub |
| 2011 | Lego Ninjago The New Masters of Spinjitzu | Zane | Short |
| 2011 | Lego Flight of the Dragon Ninja | Zane | Short |
| 2011 | Lego Battle Between Brothers | Zane | Short |
| 2018 | Ninjago: Age of the Golden Master | Brent | Fan Film |

=== Television ===
List of voice performances in television shows
| Year | Title | Role | Notes |
|---|---|---|---|
| 1995 | Mobile Suit Gundam Wing | Additional voices | 10 episodes; English dub |
| 1997 | Mobile Suit Gundam Wing: Endless Waltz | Additional voices | 3 episodes; English dub |
| 1998 | Mobile Suit Gundam Wing: Endless Waltz | Additional voices | Television movie |
| 1998–99 | RoboCop: Alpha Commando | Additional voices | 40 episodes |
| 1999 | Z-Mind | Koji | Unknown |
| 2001 | Super Duper Sumos | Additional voices | Unknown |
| 2001 | Star Ocean EX | Dias Flac | 11 episodes |
| 2001 | Prince Shotoku | Kume | Television movie |
| 2002 | Sabrina the Teenage Witch in Friends Forever | Hockey Player | Television movie |
| 2002–03 | Transformers: Armada | Hot Shot | 50 episodes; English dub |
| 2004 | Transformers: Energon | Hot Shot | 34 episodes; English dub |
| 2004 | Dragon Booster | Racer Goon | 2 episodes |
| 2004 | Mobile Suit Gundam SEED Destiny | Sting Oakley | 6 episodes; English dub |
| 2005 | Starship Operators | Connery | 4 episodes |
| 2007 | GeoTrax Rail and Road Systems | Opie | 3 episodes |
| 2008 | Bratz | Evan / Hunky Guy / Pedestrian #1 | 1 episode |
| 2008–09 | Mobile Suit Gundam 00 | Andrei Smirnov / Katharon Leader | 22 episodes; English dub |
| 2011–22 | Ninjago | Zane / Echo Zane / Additional voices | Main cast role |
| 2015–16 | Gintama | Hattori Zenzo | 8 episodes; English dub |
| 2016 | Lego Ninjago Masters of Spinjitzu - Day of the Departed | Zane | Television movie |
| 2017 | World Trigger | Various voices | |
| 2019–present | Tobot Athlon | Ambulan, Agent A-1, Zenzo Hattori | |
| 2021 | Hello Carbot | Thunder and Phaser | |
| 2023–present | Ninjago: Dragons Rising | Zane, additional voices | Main cast role |

=== Video games ===
List of voice performances in video games
| Year | Title | Voice role | Notes |
|---|---|---|---|
| 1998 | Ehrgeiz | Hal | |
| 2001 | Triple Play Baseball | Additional Voices | |
| 2002 | Need for Speed: Hot Pursuit 2 | Sergeant 9 | |
| 2002 | Mobile Suit Gundam: Federation vs. Zeon | Mash | English dub |
| 2003 | Mobile Suit Gundam: Encounters in Space | Mash | English dub |
| 2004 | CSI: Dark Motives | Suspicious Thug | |
| 2007 | Dynasty Warriors: Gundam | Mash | English dub |
| 2008 | Dynasty Warriors: Gundam 2 | Mash | English dub |
| 2016 | Homeworld: Deserts of Kharak | Coalition Battlecruiser / Assault Commander | |

=== Staff credits ===
| Year | Title | Staff | Notes |
|---|---|---|---|
| 1998 | Fat Dog Mendoza | Production Co-Ordinator | 2 Episodes |
| 1998-99 | RoboCop: Alpha Commando | Director Assistant & Production Co-Ordinator | 40 Episodes |
| 2000 | Adventures from the Book of Virtues | Production Co-Ordinator | 13 Episodes |
| 2000 | Milo's Bug Quest | Production Co-Ordinator | 1 Episode |
| 2000 | Generation O! | Production Co-Ordinator | 1 Episode |
| 2001 | The Cramp Twins | Production Manager | 1 Episode |
| 2004 | Stellaluna | Assistant Voice Director | Video Short |
