= Lego Ninjago (disambiguation) =

Lego Ninjago (IPA: /nɪnˈdʒɑːɡoʊ/, nin-JAH-goh) is a Lego theme introduced in 2011.

Lego Ninjago may refer to:

== Media ==
=== Entertainment ===
- Ninjago (TV series), a TV series based on the Lego theme with the same name, introduced in 2011
  - Ninjago: Masters of Spinjitzu pilot episodes, the pilot episodes for the series
  - Ninjago: Rise of the Snakes, the first season in the series
  - Ninjago: Legacy of the Green Ninja, the second season in the series
  - Ninjago: Rebooted, the third season in the series
  - Ninjago: Tournament of Elements, the fourth season in the series
  - Ninjago: Possession, the fifth season in the series
  - Ninjago: Skybound, the sixth season in the series
  - Ninjago: Day of the Departed, a special set between the sixth and seventh seasons in the series
  - Ninjago: Hands of Time, the seventh season in the series
  - Ninjago: Sons of Garmadon, the eighth season in the series
  - Ninjago: Hunted, the ninth season in the series
  - Ninjago: March of the Oni, the tenth season in the series
  - Ninjago: Secrets of the Forbidden Spinjitzu, the eleventh season in the series
  - Ninjago: Prime Empire, the twelfth season in the series
  - Ninjago: Master of the Mountain, the thirteenth season in the series
  - Ninjago: The Island, a miniseries set between the thirteenth and fourteenth seasons; also the first part of Seabound
  - Ninjago: Seabound, the fourteenth season in the series
  - Ninjago: Crystalized, the fifteenth season in the series
- The Lego Ninjago Movie, a standalone movie based on the Lego theme
- Ninjago: Dragons Rising, a TV series serving as a sequel to Ninjago, introduced in 2023

=== Video games ===
Lego Ninjago (video game franchise), the video game franchise that coincides with the Lego theme

- Lego Battles: Ninjago, a video game known as Lego Ninjago: The Videogame in a few regions
- Lego Ninjago: Nindroids, a video game based on the third season of the Ninjago TV series
- Lego Ninjago: Shadow of Ronin, a video game based on an original story
- The Lego Ninjago Movie Video Game, a video game based on the movie with the same name

== Other uses ==
- The Lego Ninjago Movie (Lego theme), the Lego theme coinciding with the movie with the same name
- The Lego Ninjago Movie (soundtrack), the soundtrack for the movie with the same name
- List of Ninjago episodes, an episode list for both TV series
- List of Ninjago characters, a character list for both TV series

== See also ==
- Lego (disambiguation)
- Lego Ninja, a discontinued Lego theme also related to ninja
