= The Lego Ninjago Movie (Lego theme) =

Lego theme based on The Lego Ninjago Movie

- Subject: The Lego Ninjago Movie
- Licensed from: Warner Bros. Pictures and Warner Animation Group
- Availability: 1 August 2017–31 December 2019
- Total sets: 28
- Characters: Lloyd Garmadon, Kai, Cole, Zane, Jay, Nya, Master Wu, Lord Garmadon and Misako "Koko"
- Official website

The Lego Ninjago Movie is a discontinued product line based on The Lego Ninjago Movie, the third film of The Lego Movie franchise. It was licensed from the Lego Group, Warner Bros. Pictures, and Warner Animation Group. The theme was introduced on 1 August 2017 as part of a licensing and merchandising programme associated with the film. Alongside the release of the Lego sets, the programme included the release of several promotional short films and The Lego Ninjago Movie Video Game. The product line was discontinued by 31 December 2019.

== Overview ==
The Lego Ninjago Movie theme was based on the characters and events of the 2017 film titled The Lego Ninjago Movie. The main focus of the line is Lloyd Garmadon, the leader of a group of six teenage ninja and the son of Lord Garmadon, the villainous warlord who is intent on conquering Ninjago City. The film and toy line were based on the long running Lego Ninjago theme and its associated animated television series, Ninjago, which were launched in 2011.

== Development ==
Following the success of The Lego Movie and The Lego Batman Movie, The Lego Group aimed to make a third success with The Lego Ninjago Movie. The development of the theme was the result of a collaboration between the film makers and Lego designers. The Lego Ninjago Movie was developed to reach a wider audience than the Ninjago television series, which meant that it diverged from the television series storyline. The development of both the film and its associated product line was predominantly influenced by the writers and directors of the film, however the Lego design team ensured that the characters remained true to the series. Designer Christopher Stamp commented, "We also emphasised the importance of specialised vehicles for each of the ninja, not only because they look great on screen but also because they are a lot of fun to build and play with as a physical toy. For instance, Warner Bros. actually suggested that Kai should pilot a mech in the movie and gave some indication of how it might look before a Lego designer was able to create a set to be released in conjunction with the film." Senior Creative Director, Simon Lucas commented, "We invited the director and production designer to Denmark and spent a week doing what we call a design boost. We got several Lego designers together and asked them: 'We know that Kai needs a fire-mech in the scene - what does that look like? What's the functionality?' And then we sketched in the Lego bricks."

== Characters ==
The main characters of the theme are based on the principal characters in The Lego Ninjago Movie.

- Lloyd Garmadon - The Green Ninja, leader of the Secret Ninja Force, Lord Garmadon and Misako's son and Master Wu's nephew.
- Kai - The hotheaded, red Ninja of Fire and Nya's brother.
- Jay - The quiet and cautious, blue Ninja of Lightning.
- Nya - The strong, silver Ninja of Water, Kai's sister, and Jay's crush.
- Zane - The robotic, white Ninja of Ice.
- Cole - The laid-back, music-loving black Ninja of Earth.
- Master Wu - The wisecracking leader of the group, Lord Garmadon's brother and Lloyd's uncle.
- Lord Garmadon - The Lord of Evil, an evil warlord, the father of Lloyd, the ex-husband of Misako and the brother of Master Wu.
- Misako "Koko" - Lord Garmadon's ex-wife and Lloyd's mother. She was formerly known as the legendary "Lady Iron Dragon" when she worked as a warrior-queen.

== Toy line ==
=== Construction sets ===
According to BrickLink, The Lego Group released a total of 28 Lego sets and promotional polybags as part of The Lego Ninjago Movie theme. It was discontinued by 31 December 2019.

In August 2017, The Lego Group announced a partnership with Warner Bros. Consumer Products to create a licensing and merchandising programme based on The Lego Ninjago Movie, which was released on 22 September 2017. The partnership included the release of more than 15 sets based on The Lego Ninjago Movie. The Lego sets released included Spinjitzu Training Dojo, Ninjago City Chase, Master Falls, Manta Ray Bomber, Flying Jelly Sub, Water Strider, Green Ninja Mech Dragon, Garma Mecha Man, Lightning Jet, Fire Mech, Ice Tank, Temple of the Ultimate Ultimate Weapon, Destiny's Bounty and Ninjago City.

The largest set was Ninjago City (set number: 70620) a 4867-piece set, which was released in late August to coincide with the release of The Lego Ninjago Movie film. Although not advertised as a modular building, it featured the same structure as the regular modulars with a 32 × 32 stud baseplate, building connectors and a river matching the same dimensions as the sidewalk. It was a huge multi-level model with themed levels. The bottom level contained the "old world" with an old fashioned fish market; the middle level contained "the street" with a modern comic store, crab restaurant and a retail store; and the top level, named "high rise", contained a sushi restaurant topped with a "Dragon Gate" and communications assembly, as well as a small living apartment for the Green Ninja character Lloyd Garmadon and his mother. The set included sixteen different minifigures.

The second wave of Lego sets was released on 2 December 2017. The five sets were Lloyd - Spinjitzu Master, Piranha Attack, Garmadon's Volcano Lair, Quake Mech and garmadon, Garmadon, GARMADON! In addition, five polybag sets were released as promotions, which were Quake Mech, Ice Tank, Green Ninja Mech Dragon, Kendo Lloyd and Lloyd. These included nine key chains with a key chain attached to the minifigures of the Kai, Zane, Jay, Cole, Lloyd, Nya, Lady Iron Dragon, Lord Garmadon, and Master Wu. Additional sets were released as a sub-brand of the Lego Brickheadz theme. The Lego Ninjago Movie Video Game was released on 22 September 2017 and included a Kendo Lloyd minifigure as a free gift.

In 2018, Ninjago City Docks, a large set with 3553 pieces, was released on 1 August 2018 as a third wave set. It connected to the regular modulars and the Ninjago City, with which it shared the basic layout of river, bottom-levelled "old-world", and middle-levelled "street". Unlike its predecessor, it did not feature the "high-rise"-levels, but extended over an enlarged baseplate of 48 x 32 studs. The bottom levels contained the "old world" with a harbour, a grocer, and a sculptor's workshop, as well as a dojo, a map room, and a small home. The "street" levels hosted a tea room and an arcade. The set included fourteen different minifigures.

=== Collectible minifigures ===
In August 2017, a series of collectible Lego minifigures based on The Lego Ninjago Movie was revealed as a sub-brand of the Lego Minifigures theme. The collection consisted of twenty characters instead of the usual sixteen.

=== Lego Juniors sets ===
The set Shark Attack was released as part of the Lego Juniors theme in August 2017. The set consists of 108 pieces with 3 minifigures. The set included a training area with a weapon stand, breakable blocks, a spinning training dummy, a motorbike with a detachable flame and flag, and a shark car with movable fins and dual flick missiles. It also included Lego minifigures of Kai, Lloyd, and Great White. These set were specifically designed to be simpler to build with fewer pieces and slightly larger building elements.

=== Lego BrickHeadz sets ===
Several The Lego Ninjago Movie characters have also been released as part of the Lego BrickHeadz theme. A range of The Lego Ninjago Movie BrickHeadz was released in September 2017, which included Lloyd and Master Wu as buildable characters.

== Film ==
=== The Lego Ninjago Movie ===
Brothers Dan and Kevin Hageman, who wrote the Ninjago: Masters of Spinjitzu animated television series and co-wrote the story of The Lego Movie, also co-wrote The Lego Ninjago Movie, the film adaptation of Lego Ninjago, which featured a new take that diverges from the TV series. Charlie Bean, who produced Disney's Tron: Uprising, directed the film, produced by The Lego Movie team of Dan Lin, Roy Lee, Phil Lord and Christopher Miller. The spin-off movie was scheduled to be released on September 23, 2016. On April 20, 2015, the film was delayed until September 22, 2017, as Storks took over the original release date of the movie. In June 2016, the cast was announced to include Jackie Chan, Dave Franco, Michael Peña, Abbi Jacobson, Kumail Nanjiani, Zach Woods and Fred Armisen.

== Short films ==
Several short films set within the franchise were produced, most of which were released on the home media releases of the films. In addition, various other shorts made to promote the films were released on YouTube.

=== Enter the Ninjago (2014) ===
Enter the Ninjago is a short film included on the home media release of The Lego Movie. The president of Hollywood sits down with Emmet and changes up the plot of The Lego Movie to prominently feature ninjas for marketing purposes. They eventually decide to create a new ninja based film, titled "The super-crunchy ninja skateboard party movie with pratfalls slash physical comedy and cute furry animals for the international audience" which the short jokingly states became the biggest box-office bomb in the history of cinema. The film is reference to Lego Ninjago.

=== The Master (2016) ===
The Master is a 2016 animated short film written and directed by Jon Saunders, co-written by Ross Evans, Carey Yost and Remington D. Donovan and produced by Ryan Halprin. The short film was released on 23 September 2016, with Warner Animation Group's Storks, as well as early showings of The Lego Batman Movie in the United Kingdom. It stars Jackie Chan as Master Wu, Abbi Jacobson as The Chicken, and Justin Theroux as Narrator. The short follows Wu and an annoying chicken. This was the first Lego short film to be released in theaters, and was also the first theatrical short film from The Lego Movie franchise.

=== Shark E. Shark in "Which Way To The Ocean?" (2017) ===
Shark E. Shark in "Which Way To The Ocean?" is a short film included on the home media release of The Lego Ninjago Movie. The short follows a baby shark who tries to make its way back to the ocean after getting shot out of Garmadon's shark cannon. The short is animated in the style of the artwork seen in Lego instruction booklets.

=== Zane's Stand Up Promo (2017) ===
Zane's Stand Up Promo is a short film included on the home media release of The Lego Ninjago Movie. The short itself is a humorous promo for a stand-up comedy DVD starring Zane.

== Video games ==
=== The Lego Ninjago Movie Video Game ===
To accompany the release of The Lego Ninjago Movie, a video game titled The Lego Ninjago Movie Video Game was released in North America on 22 September 2017 and worldwide on 20 October 2017. It is an action-adventure video game developed by TT Fusion and published by Warner Bros. Interactive Entertainment. The game features eight locations based on the story in the film. It was released for Microsoft Windows, Nintendo Switch, PlayStation 4, and Xbox One.

=== Lego Worlds ===
The Lego-themed sandbox game titled Lego Worlds also features the characters and locations from the film in the form of downloadable content and was released on 7 March 2017.

== Publications ==
Various books were published to coincide with the release of The Lego Ninjago Movie. A series of DK Reader Level 1, 2, 3 and 4 reading books was published, which was aimed at young readers. An accompanying publication aimed at older children was published, titled The Ninjago Movie Essential Guide. The DK series also included a sticker book featuring scenes from the film.

== Reception ==
In 2020, Ninjago City (set number: 70620) was voted as the "Best Lego Set of the Millennium" by Lego fansite Brickset.

In 2021, Blocks magazine Issue 75 listed the Ninjago City set in fourth place in its "Hall of Fame" list of top 20 Lego sets commenting that, "There are few sets that can compare to Ninjago City's size, scope and almost overwhelming level of detail and technique." It also listed the Destiny's Bounty (set number: 70618) in eighth place, commenting that it was "A highly detailed and exquisitely-designed vessel".

== Awards and nominations ==
In 2017, Destiny's Bounty (set number: 70618) and Green Ninja Mech Dragon (set number: 70612) were awarded "DreamToys" in the Licensed To Thrill category by the Toy Retailers Association.

== See also ==
- The Lego Movie
- The Lego Movie (Lego theme)
- The Lego Batman Movie
- The Lego Batman Movie (Lego theme)
- The Lego Movie 2: The Second Part
- Lego Unikitty!
- Lego Ninjago
- Ninjago (TV series)
- Ninjago: Dragons Rising
- Lego Battles: Ninjago
- Lego Ninjago: Nindroids
- Lego Ninjago: Shadow of Ronin
- Lego Ninjago: Master of the 4th Dimension
- Lego Brawls
- Lego Dimensions
- Lego Legacy: Heroes Unboxed
- Nexo Knights
- Lego Legends of Chima
