= List of Ninjago episodes =

Ninjago (previously known as Ninjago: Masters of Spinjitzu until 2019) is an animated television series. The show was produced by Wil Film ApS from the pilot episodes until the tenth season and by WildBrain Studios for the last five seasons. It is distributed by The Lego Group. It was created to coincide with the Lego Ninjago construction toys, and centres on the fictional world of Ninjago, telling the story of a group of teenage ninja and their battles against the forces of evil.

The commissioning of the first two full seasons (Rise of the Snakes and Legacy of the Green Ninja), which each consisted of 13 episodes. The first season aired on 2 December 2011. Both the Lego theme and the TV series had an intended shelf life of three years, so it was expected that the second season would be the last. However, after feedback from fans, it was soon revived and it continued for ten more years. In 2017, a film adaptation of the series, The Lego Ninjago Movie, was released. In the eighth season of the show in 2018, the animation software of the show was updated and new character designs and aesthetics were adopted from the film. Despite these aesthetic changes, the eighth season continued the story of the previous seasons instead of the film's rebooted storyline. With the release of the eleventh season in 2019, the show was sold to WildBrain Studios who dropped the "Masters of Spinjitzu" subtitle and switched from a 22-minute format to an 11-minute running time. In total, 15 seasons were produced, along with two pilot episodes, several mini movies, a special, a four-episode miniseries, and a theme park movie.

== Series overview ==
Season	Subtitle	Episodes	Originally released	
Season	Subtitle	Episodes	First released	Last released
Pilots	Masters of Spinjitzu or Way of the Ninja (Note: No official subtitle has been given to the pilots, though LEGO.com has referred to it as Masters of Spinjitzu, while co-creator Tommy Andreasen has said "[they] have referred to it as Way of the Ninja.")	4	January 14, 2011	
1	Rise of the Snakes	13	December 2, 2011	April 11, 2012
2	Legacy of the Green Ninja	13	July 18, 2012	November 21, 2012
3	Rebooted	8	January 29, 2014	November 26, 2014
4	Tournament of Elements	10	February 23, 2015	April 3, 2015
5	Possession	10	June 29, 2015	July 10, 2015
6	Skybound	10	March 24, 2016	July 15, 2016
Special	Day of the Departed	1	October 29, 2016	
7	Hands of Time	10	May 15, 2017	May 26, 2017
8	Sons of Garmadon	10	April 16, 2018	May 25, 2018
9	Hunted	10	August 11, 2018	August 25, 2018
10	March of the Oni	4	April 19, 2019	
11	Secrets of the Forbidden Spinjitzu	30	June 22, 2019	February 1, 2020
12	Prime Empire	16	July 19, 2020	August 30, 2020
13	Master of the Mountain	16	September 13, 2020	October 25, 2020
Miniseries (Note: In some countries, it was broadcast as a 4-part miniseries and in others as a special.)	The Island	4	March 7, 2021	March 14, 2021
14	Seabound	16	April 4, 2021	April 30, 2021
15	Crystalized	30	May 20, 2022	October 1, 2022

== Episodes ==
=== Pilot episodes (2011) ===
The pilot episodes exist in 2 versions, a two-episode version, titled "Way of the Ninja" (which combines "Way of the Ninja" and "The Golden Weapon") and "King of Shadows" (which combines "King of Shadows" and "Weapons of Destiny"), respectively, each about 22 minutes long, as well as a four-episode version, each about 11 minutes long, which is listed here. Each region has a different version.

No. overall	No. in season	Title	Directed by	Written by	Original release date
P1	P1	"Way of the Ninja"	Michael Hegner & Justin Murphy	The Hageman Brothers	January 14, 2011
P2	P2	"The Golden Weapon"	Justin Murphy	The Hageman Brothers	January 14, 2011
P3	P3	"King of Shadows"	Justin Murphy	The Hageman Brothers	January 14, 2011
P4	P4	"Weapons of Destiny"	Justin Murphy	The Hageman Brothers	January 14, 2011

=== Season 1: Rise of the Snakes (2011–12) ===
No. overall	No. in season	Title	Directed by	Written by	Original release date	U.S. viewers (millions)
1	1	"Rise of the Snakes"	Peter Hausner	The Hageman Brothers	December 2, 2011	N/A
2	2	"Home"	Justin Murphy	The Hageman Brothers	December 2, 2011	N/A
3	3	"Snakebit"	Martin Skov	The Hageman Brothers	January 25, 2012	1.77
4	4	"Never Trust a Snake"	Peter Hausner	The Hageman Brothers	February 1, 2012	2.47
5	5	"Can of Worms"	Justin Murphy	The Hageman Brothers	February 8, 2012	1.99
6	6	"The Snake King"	Martin Skov	The Hageman Brothers	February 15, 2012	2.18
7	7	"Tick Tock"	Peter Hausner	The Hageman Brothers	February 22, 2012	2.44
8	8	"Once Bitten, Twice Shy"	Justin Murphy	The Hageman Brothers	March 7, 2012	2.21
9	9	"The Royal Blacksmiths"	Martin Skov	The Hageman Brothers	March 14, 2012	1.76
10	10	"The Green Ninja"	Peter Hausner	The Hageman Brothers	March 21, 2012	2.62
11	11	"All of Nothing"	Justin Murphy	The Hageman Brothers	March 28, 2012	2.02
12	12	"The Rise of the Great Devourer"	Martin Skov	The Hageman Brothers	April 4, 2012	1.90
13	13	"Day of the Great Devourer"	Peter Hausner	The Hageman Brothers	April 11, 2012	3.34

=== Season 2: Legacy of the Green Ninja (2012) ===
No. overall	No. in season	Title	Directed by	Written by	Original release date	U.S. viewers (millions)
14	1	"Darkness Shall Rise"	Michael Helmuth Hansen	The Hageman Brothers	July 18, 2012	2.85
15	2	"Pirates vs. Ninjas"	Trylle Vilstrup	The Hageman Brothers	July 25, 2012	2.30
16	3	"Double Trouble"	Martin Skov	The Hageman Brothers & Joel Thomas	August 1, 2012	2.08
17	4	"Ninjaball Run"	Thomas Østergaard Poulsen	The Hageman Brothers & Joel Thomas	August 8, 2012	2.38
18	5	"Child's Play"	Michael Helmuth Hansen	The Hageman Brothers	August 15, 2012	2.79
19	6	"Wrong Place, Wrong Time"	Trylle Vilstrup	The Hageman Brothers	August 22, 2012	2.31
20	7	"The Stone Army"	Martin Skov	The Hageman Brothers	October 3, 2012	2.17
21	8	"The Day Ninjago Stood Still"	Peter Hausner	The Hageman Brothers & Joel Thomas	October 10, 2012	1.98
22	9	"The Last Voyage"	Michael Helmuth Hansen	The Hageman Brothers & Joel Thomas	October 17, 2012	1.84
23	10	"Island of Darkness"	Trylle Vilstrup	The Hageman Brothers	October 24, 2012	1.74
24	11	"The Last Hope"	Martin Skov	The Hageman Brothers & Joel Thomas	November 7, 2012	1.87
25	12	"Return of the Overlord"	Peter Hausner	The Hageman Brothers	November 14, 2012	1.82
26	13	"Rise of the Spinjitzu Master"	Michael Helmuth Hansen	The Hageman Brothers	November 21, 2012	3.11

=== Season 3: Rebooted (2014) ===
No. overall	No. in season	Title	Directed by	Written by	Original release date	U.S. viewers (millions)
27	1	"The Surge"	Peter Hausner	The Hageman Brothers	January 29, 2014	2.04
28	2	"The Art of the Silent Fist"	Martin Skov	The Hageman Brothers	January 29, 2014	2.08
29	3	"Blackout"	Michael Helmuth Hansen	The Hageman Brothers	April 16, 2014	2.04
30	4	"The Curse of the Golden Master"	Trylle Vilstrup	The Hageman Brothers	April 16, 2014	1.85
31	5	"Enter the Digiverse"	Peter Hausner	The Hageman Brothers	July 13, 2014	N/A
32	6	"Codename: Arcturus"	Michael Helmuth Hansen	The Hageman Brothers	July 13, 2014	N/A
33	7	"The Void"	Jens Møller	The Hageman Brothers	November 26, 2014	2.34
34	8	"The Titanium Ninja"	Peter Hausner	The Hageman Brothers	November 26, 2014	2.38

=== Season 4: Tournament of Elements (2015) ===
No. overall	No. in season	Title	Directed by	Written by	Original release date	U.S. viewers (millions)
35	1	"The Invitation"	Trylle Vilstrup	The Hageman Brothers	February 23, 2015	N/A
36	2	"Only One Can Remain"	Michael Helmuth Hansen	The Hageman Brothers	March 2, 2015	1.43
37	3	"Versus"	Jens Møller	The Hageman Brothers	March 9, 2015	N/A
38	4	"Ninja Roll"	Peter Hausner	The Hageman Brothers	March 16, 2015	N/A
39	5	"Spy for a Spy"	Trylle Vilstrup	The Hageman Brothers	March 23, 2015	N/A
40	6	"Spellbound"	Michael Helmuth Hansen	The Hageman Brothers	March 30, 2015	N/A
41	7	"The Forgotten Element"	Jens Møller	The Hageman Brothers	March 31, 2015	N/A
42	8	"The Day of the Dragon"	Peter Hausner	The Hageman Brothers	April 1, 2015	N/A
43	9	"The Greatest Fear of All"	Per Düring Risager	The Hageman Brothers	April 2, 2015	N/A
44	10	"The Corridor of Elders"	Trylle Vilstrup	The Hageman Brothers	April 3, 2015	N/A

=== Season 5: Possession (2015) ===
No. overall	No. in season	Title	Directed by	Written by	Original release date	U.S. viewers (millions)
45	1	"Winds of Change"	Michael Helmuth Hansen	The Hageman Brothers	June 29, 2015	2.05
46	2	"Ghost Story"	Jens Møller	The Hageman Brothers	June 30, 2015	1.83
47	3	"Stiix and Stones"	Peter Hausner	The Hageman Brothers	July 1, 2015	2.13
48	4	"The Temple on Haunted Hill"	Trylle Vilstrup	The Hageman Brothers	July 2, 2015	1.93
49	5	"Peak-a-Boo"	Michael Helmuth Hansen	The Hageman Brothers	July 3, 2015	1.82
50	6	"Kingdom Come"	Jens Møller	The Hageman Brothers	July 6, 2015	1.71
51	7	"The Crooked Path"	Peter Hausner	The Hageman Brothers	July 7, 2015	1.91
52	8	"Grave Danger"	Trylle Vilstrup	The Hageman Brothers	July 8, 2015	1.78
53	9	"Curseworld"	Michael Helmuth Hansen	The Hageman Brothers	July 9, 2015	1.52
54	10	"Curseworld"	Jens Møller	The Hageman Brothers	July 10, 2015	1.62

=== Season 6: Skybound (2016) ===
No. overall	No. in season	Title	Directed by	Written by	Original release date	U.S. viewers (millions)
55	1	"Infamous"	Peter Hausner	The Hageman Brothers	March 24, 2016	0.98
56	2	"Public Enemy Number One"	Michael Helmuth Hansen	The Hageman Brothers	June 16, 2016	1.01
57	3	"Enkrypted"	Jens Møller	The Hageman Brothers	June 23, 2016	1.17
58	4	"Misfortune Rising"	Peter Hausner	The Hageman Brothers	June 30, 2016	1.31
59	5	"On a Wish and a Prayer"	Michael Helmuth Hansen	The Hageman Brothers	July 11, 2016	1.15
60	6	"My Dinner With Nadakhan"	Jens Møller	The Hageman Brothers	July 12, 2016	1.17
61	7	"Wishmasters"	Peter Hausner	The Hageman Brothers	July 13, 2016	1.11
62	8	"The Last Resort"	Michael Helmuth Hansen	The Hageman Brothers	July 14, 2016	1.05
63	9	"Operation Land Ho!"	Jens Møller	The Hageman Brothers	July 15, 2016	1.20
64	10	"The Way Back"	Peter Hausner	The Hageman Brothers	July 15, 2016	1.15

=== Special: Day of the Departed (2016) ===
Title	Directed by	Written by	Original release date
"Day of the Departed"	Peter Hausner	David Shayne	October 29, 2016

=== Season 7: Hands of Time (2017) ===
No. overall	No. in season	Title	Directed by	Written by	Original release date	U.S. viewers (millions)
65	1	"The Hands of Time"	Michael Helmuth Hansen	David Shayne	May 15, 2017	0.73
66	2	"The Hatching"	Trylle Vilstrup	David Shayne	May 16, 2017	0.71
67	3	"A Time of Traitors"	Peter Hausner	John Behnke	May 17, 2017	0.77
68	4	"Scavengers"	Michael Helmuth Hansen	Jack Thomas	May 18, 2017	0.77
69	5	"A Line in the Sand"	Trylle Vilstrup	Adam Beechen	May 19, 2017	0.77
70	6	"The Attack"	Peter Hausner	Ryan Levin	May 22, 2017	0.71
71	7	"Secrets Discovered"	Michael Helmuth Hansen	Jack Thomas	May 23, 2017	0.93
72	8	"Pause and Effect"	Trylle Vilstrup	John Behnke	May 24, 2017	0.84
73	9	"Out of the Fire and Into the Boiling Sea"	Peter Hausner	David Shayne	May 25, 2017	0.85
74	10	"Lost in Time"	Michael Helmuth Hansen	David Shayne	May 26, 2017	0.75

=== Season 8: Sons of Garmadon (2018) ===
No. overall	No. in season	Title	Directed by	Written by	Story by	Original release date	U.S. viewers (millions)
75	1	"The Mask of Deception"	Peter Hausner	The Hageman Brothers & Bragi Schut	The Hageman Brothers	April 16, 2018	0.50
76	2	"The Jade Princess"	Jens Møller	The Hageman Brothers & Bragi Schut	The Hageman Brothers	April 23, 2018	0.46
77	3	"The Oni and the Dragon"	Trylle Vilstrup	The Hageman Brothers & Bragi Schut	The Hageman Brothers	April 30, 2018	0.53
78	4	"Snake Jaguar"	Michael Helmuth Hansen	The Hageman Brothers	The Hageman Brothers	May 7, 2018	0.58
79	5	"Dead Man's Squall"	Frederik Budolph	Bragi Schut	The Hageman Brothers	May 14, 2018	0.48
80	6	"The Quiet One"	Jens Møller	Bragi Schut	The Hageman Brothers	May 21, 2018	0.45
81	7	"Game of Masks"	Trylle Vilstrup	The Hageman Brothers	The Hageman Brothers	May 22, 2018	0.58
82	8	"Dread on Arrival"	Michael Helmuth Hansen	The Hageman Brothers & Bragi Schut	The Hageman Brothers	May 23, 2018	0.39
83	9	"True Potential"	Jens Møller	The Hageman Brothers & Bragi Schut	The Hageman Brothers	May 24, 2018	0.57
84	10	"Big Trouble, Little Ninjago"	Trylle Vilstrup	The Hageman Brothers	The Hageman Brothers	May 25, 2018	0.55

=== Season 9: Hunted (2018) ===
No. overall	No. in season	Title	Directed by	Written by	Story by	Original release date	U.S. viewers (millions)
85	1	"Firstbourne"	Peter Hausner	The Hageman Brothers	The Hageman Brothers	August 11, 2018	0.45
86	2	"Iron & Stone"	Michael Helmuth Hansen	Bragi Schut	The Hageman Brothers	August 11, 2018	0.45
87	3	"Radio Free Ninjago"	Jens Møller	The Hageman Brothers	The Hageman Brothers	August 11, 2018	0.45
88	4	"How to Build a Dragon"	Trylle Vilstrup	Bragi Schut	The Hageman Brothers	August 11, 2018	0.45
89	5	"The Gilded Path"	Michael Helmuth Hansen	Bragi Schut	The Hageman Brothers	August 18, 2018	0.50
90	6	"Two Lies, One Truth"	Jens Møller	The Hageman Brothers	The Hageman Brothers	August 18, 2018	0.50
91	7	"The Weakest Link"	Trylle Vilstrup	The Hageman Brothers	The Hageman Brothers	August 18, 2018	0.50
92	8	"Saving Faith"	Michael Helmuth Hansen & Peter Egeberg	The Hageman Brothers	The Hageman Brothers	August 25, 2018	0.34
93	9	"Lessons for a Master"	Jens Møller	Bragi Schut	The Hageman Brothers	August 25, 2018	0.34
94	10	"Green Destiny"	Peter Hausner	The Hageman Brothers	The Hageman Brothers	August 25, 2018	0.34

=== Season 10: March of the Oni (2019) ===
No. overall	No. in season	Title	Directed by	Written by	Original release date	U.S. viewers (millions)
95	1	"The Darkness Comes"	Per Risager	Bragi Schut	April 19, 2019	0.44
96	2	"Into the Breach"	Peter Hausner	Bragi Schut	April 19, 2019	0.44
97	3	"The Fall"	Frederik Budolph	Bragi Schut	April 19, 2019	0.44
98	4	"Endings"	Peter Hausner	Bragi Schut	April 19, 2019	0.44

=== Season 11: Secrets of the Forbidden Spinjitzu (2019–20) ===
No. overall	No. in season	Title	Directed by	Written by	Original release date	U.S. viewers (millions)
The Fire Chapter
99	1	"Wasted True Potential"	Wade Cross	Bragi Schut	June 22, 2019	0.31
100	2	"Questing for Quests"	Daniel Ife	Bragi Schut	June 22, 2019	0.30
101	3	"A Rocky Start"	Shane Poettcker	Bragi Schut	June 29, 2019	0.32
102	4	"The Belly of the Beast"	Wade Cross	Bragi Schut	June 29, 2019	0.31
103	5	"Boobytraps and How to Survive Them"	Daniel Ife	Bragi Schut	July 6, 2019	0.22
104	6	"The News Never Sleeps!"	Shane Poettcker	Bragi Schut	July 6, 2019	0.19
105	7	"Ninja vs Lava"	Wade Cross	Kevin Burke & Chris "Doc" Wyatt	July 13, 2019	0.41
106	8	"Snaketastrophy"	Daniel Ife	Kevin Burke & Chris "Doc" Wyatt	July 13, 2019	0.35
107	9	"Powerless"	Shane Poettcker	Kevin Burke & Chris "Doc" Wyatt	July 20, 2019	0.24
108	10	"Ancient History"	Wade Cross	Bragi Schut	July 20, 2019	0.27
109	11	"Never Trust a Human"	Daniel Ife	Bragi Schut	July 27, 2019	0.24
110	12	"Under Siege"	Shane Poettcker	Kevin Burke & Chris "Doc" Wyatt	July 27, 2019	0.23
111	13	"The Explorers Club"	Wade Cross	Kevin Burke & Chris "Doc" Wyatt	August 3, 2019	0.32
112	14	"Vengeance is Mine!"	Daniel Ife	Bragi Schut	August 3, 2019	0.27
113	15	"A Cold Goodbye"	Shane Poettcker	Bragi Schut	August 10, 2019	0.29
The Ice Chapter
114	16	"The Never-Realm"	Wade Cross	Bragi Schut	December 14, 2019	0.37
115	17	"Fire Maker"	Daniel Ife	Bragi Schut	December 14, 2019	0.37
116	18	"An Unlikely Ally"	Shane Poettcker	Bragi Schut	December 21, 2019	0.34
117	19	"The Absolute Worst"	Wade Cross	Kevin Burke & Chris "Doc" Wyatt	December 21, 2019	0.34
118	20	"The Message"	Daniel Ife	Bragi Schut	December 28, 2019	0.46
119	21	"The Traveler's Tree"	Shane Poettcker	Kevin Burke & Chris "Doc" Wyatt	December 28, 2019	0.46
120	22	"Krag's Lament"	Wade Cross	Kevin Burke & Chris "Doc" Wyatt	January 4, 2020	0.42
121	23	"Secret of the Wolf"	Daniel Ife	Matt "Chato" Hill	January 4, 2020	0.42
122	24	"The Last of the Formlings"	Daniel Ife	Kevin Burke & Chris "Doc" Wyatt	January 11, 2020	N/A
123	25	"My Enemy, My Friend"	Wade Cross	Bragi Schut	January 11, 2020	N/A
124	26	"The Kaiju Protocol"	Daniel Ife	Kevin Burke & Chris "Doc" Wyatt	January 18, 2020	N/A
125	27	"Corruption"	Shane Poettcker	Bragi Schut	January 18, 2020	N/A
126	28	"A Fragile Hope"	Wade Cross	Matt "Chato" Hill	January 25, 2020	N/A
127	29	"Once and for All"	Shane Poettcker	Bragi Schut	January 25, 2020	N/A
128	30	"Awakenings"	Shane Poettcker	Bragi Schut	February 1, 2020	N/A

=== Season 12: Prime Empire (2020) ===
No. overall	No. in season	Title	Directed by	Written by	Original release date	U.S. viewers (millions)
129	1	"Would You Like to Enter Prime Empire?"	Wade Cross	Alisha Brophy & Scott Miles	July 19, 2020	0.28
130	2	"Dyer Island"	Daniel Ife	Alisha Brophy & Scott Miles	July 19, 2020	0.23
131	3	"Level Thirteen"	Shane Poettcker	Alisha Brophy & Scott Miles	July 19, 2020	0.22
132	4	"Superstar Rockin' Jay"	Wade Cross	Kevin Burke & Chris "Doc" Wyatt	July 19, 2020	0.23
133	5	"I am Okino"	Daniel Ife	Kevin Burke & Chris "Doc" Wyatt	July 26, 2020	0.23
134	6	"The Glitch"	Shane Poettcker	Bragi Schut	July 26, 2020	0.23
135	7	"The Cliffs of Hysteria"	Wade Cross	Bragi Schut	August 2, 2020	0.14
136	8	"The Maze of the Red Dragon"	Daniel Ife	Kevin Burke & Chris "Doc" Wyatt	August 2, 2020	0.17
137	9	"One Step Forward, Two Steps Back"	Shane Poettcker	Alisha Brophy & Scott Miles	August 9, 2020	0.20
138	10	"Racer Seven"	Wade Cross	Bragi Schut	August 9, 2020	0.21
139	11	"The Speedway Five-Billion"	Daniel Ife	Bragi Schut	August 16, 2020	0.25
140	12	"Stop, Drop and Side Scroll"	Shane Poettcker	Alisha Brophy & Scott Miles	August 16, 2020	0.22
141	13	"Ninjago Confidential"	Wade Cross	Kevin Burke & Chris "Doc" Wyatt	August 23, 2020	0.27
142	14	"The Prodigal Father"	Daniel Ife	Kevin Burke & Chris "Doc" Wyatt	August 23, 2020	0.24
143	15	"The Temple of Madness"	Shane Poettcker	Alisha Brophy & Scott Miles	August 30, 2020	0.24
144	16	"Game Over"	Wade Cross	Bragi Schut	August 30, 2020	0.23

=== Season 13: Master of the Mountain (2020) ===
No. overall	No. in season	Title	Directed by	Written by	Original release date	U.S. viewers (millions)
145	1	"Shintaro"	Daniel Ife	Kevin Burke & Chris "Doc" Wyatt	September 13, 2020	0.18
146	2	"Into the Dark"	Shane Poettcker	Kevin Burke & Chris "Doc" Wyatt	September 13, 2020	0.16
147	3	"The Worst Rescue Ever"	Wade Cross	Chato Hill	September 20, 2020	0.20
148	4	"The Two Blades"	Daniel Ife	Bragi Schut	September 20, 2020	0.22
149	5	"Queen of the Munce"	Shane Poettcker	Bragi Schut	September 27, 2020	0.15
150	6	"Trial By Mino"	Wade Cross	Kevin Burke & Chris "Doc" Wyatt	September 27, 2020	0.18
151	7	"The Skull Sorcerer"	Daniel Ife	Kevin Burke & Chris "Doc" Wyatt	October 4, 2020	0.15
152	8	"The Real Fall"	Shane Poettcker	Bragi Schut	October 4, 2020	0.15
153	9	"Dungeon Party!"	Wade Cross	Kevin Burke & Chris "Doc" Wyatt	October 11, 2020	0.15
154	10	"Dungeon Crawl!"	Daniel Ife	Kevin Burke & Chris "Doc" Wyatt	October 11, 2020	0.17
155	11	"Grief-Bringer"	Shane Poettcker	Bragi Schut	October 18, 2020	0.16
156	12	"Masters Never Quit"	Wade Cross	Bragi Schut	October 18, 2020	0.12
157	13	"The Darkest Hour"	Daniel Ife	Kevin Burke & Chris "Doc" Wyatt	October 25, 2020	0.17
158	14	"The Ascent"	Shane Poettcker	Bragi Schut	October 25, 2020	0.17
159	15	"The Upply Strike Back!"	Wade Cross	Bragi Schut	October 25, 2020	0.20
160	16	"The Son of Lilly"	Daniel Ife	Bragi Schut	October 25, 2020	0.20

=== Miniseries: The Island (2021) ===
No. overall	No. in season	Title	Directed by	Written by	Original release date
161	1	"Uncharted"	Daniel Ife	Bragi Schut	March 7, 2021 (Canada)
162	2	"The Keepers of the Amulet"	Shane Poettcker	Kevin Burke & Chris "Doc" Wyatt	March 7, 2021 (Canada)
163	3	"The Gift of Jay"	Wade Cross	Bragi Schut	March 14, 2021 (Canada)
164	4	"The Tooth of Wojira"	Daniel Ife	Kevin Burke & Chris "Doc" Wyatt	March 14, 2021 (Canada)

=== Season 14: Seabound (2021) ===
No. overall	No. in season	Title	Directed by	Written by	Original release date
165	1	"A Big Splash"	Shane Poettcker	Bragi Schut	April 4, 2021 (Canada)
166	2	"The Call of the Deep"	Wade Cross	Bragi Schut	April 4, 2021 (Canada)
167	3	"Unsinkable"	Daniel Ife	Kevin Burke & Chris "Doc" Wyatt	April 11, 2021 (Canada)
168	4	"Five Thousand Fathoms Down"	Shane Poettcker	Bragi Schut	April 11, 2021 (Canada)
169	5	"The Wrath of Kalmaar"	Wade Cross	Bragi Schut	April 18, 2021 (Canada)
170	6	"Long Live the King"	Daniel Ife	Kevin Burke & Chris "Doc" Wyatt	April 18, 2021 (Canada)
171	7	"Escape from Merlopia"	Shane Poettcker	Bragi Schut	April 25, 2021 (Canada)
172	8	"The Tale of Benthomaar"	Wade Cross	Kevin Burke & Chris "Doc" Wyatt	April 25, 2021 (Canada)
173	9	"The Storm Amulet"	Daniel Ife	Bragi Schut	April 27, 2021 (UK)
174	10	"Riddle of the Sphinx"	Shane Poettcker	Kevin Burke & Chris "Doc" Wyatt	April 27, 2021 (UK)
175	11	"Papergirl"	Wade Cross	Bragi Schut	April 28, 2021 (UK)
176	12	"Master of the Sea"	Daniel Ife	Kevin Burke & Chris "Doc" Wyatt	April 28, 2021 (UK)
177	13	"The Calm Before the Storm"	Shane Poettcker	Bragi Schut	April 29, 2021 (UK)
178	14	"Assault on Ninjago City"	Wade Cross	Kevin Burke & Chris "Doc" Wyatt	April 29, 2021 (UK)
179	15	"Nyad"	Daniel Ife	Bragi Schut	April 30, 2021 (UK)
180	16	"The Turn of the Tide"	Wade Cross & Shane Poettcker	Bragi Schut	April 30, 2021 (UK)

=== Season 15: Crystalized (2022) ===
No. overall	No. in season	Title	Directed by	Written by	Original release date
181	1	"Farewell the Sea"	Wade Cross	Bragi Schut	May 20, 2022
182	2	"The Call of Home"	Daniel Ife	Lauren Bradley	May 20, 2022
183	3	"The Shape of Nya"	Shane Poettcker	Kevin Burke & Chris "Doc" Wyatt	May 20, 2022
184	4	"A Mayor Problem"	Wade Cross	Liz Hara	May 20, 2022
185	5	"Public Enemies 1, 2, 3, 4, and 5!"	Daniel Ife	Lizzi Oyebode	May 20, 2022
186	6	"A Painful Promise"	Shane Poettcker	Kevin Burke & Chris "Doc" Wyatt	May 20, 2022
187	7	"Ninjago City vs. Ninja"	Wade Cross	Bragi Schut	May 20, 2022
188	8	"Kryptarium Prison Blues"	Daniel Ife	Kevin Burke & Chris "Doc" Wyatt	May 20, 2022
189	9	"Hounddog McBrag"	Shane Poettcker	Bragi Schut	May 20, 2022
190	10	"The Benefit of Grief"	Wade Cross	Bragi Schut	May 20, 2022
191	11	"The Fifth Villain"	Daniel Ife	Liz Hara	May 20, 2022
192	12	"The Council of the Crystal King"	Shane Poettcker	Bragi Schut	May 20, 2022
193	13	"A Sinister Shadow"	Wade Cross	Kevin Burke & Chris "Doc" Wyatt	September 10, 2022
194	14	"The Spider's Design"	Daniel Ife	Lauren Bradley	September 11, 2022
195	15	"The Fall of the Monastery"	Shane Poettcker	Bragi Schut; Story by : Lauren Bradley & Lizzi Oyebode	September 17, 2022
196	16	"Darkness Within"	Wade Cross	Lizzi Oyebode	September 18, 2022
197	17	"The Coming of the King"	Daniel Ife	Kevin Burke & Chris "Doc" Wyatt	September 24, 2022
198	18	"Return to Primeval's Eye"	Shane Poettcker	Bragi Schut	September 25, 2022
199	19	"Crystastrophe"	Wade Cross	Kevin Burke & Chris "Doc" Wyatt	October 1, 2022
200	20	"Christofern"	Daniel Ife	Bragi Schut	October 1, 2022
201	21	"A Lesson in Anger"	Shane Poettcker	Kevin Burke & Chris "Doc" Wyatt	October 1, 2022
202	22	"Brave But Foolish"	Wade Cross	Kevin Burke & Chris "Doc" Wyatt	October 1, 2022
203	23	"Quittin' Time!"	Daniel Ife	Bragi Schut	October 1, 2022
204	24	"Return of the Ice Emperor"	Shane Poettcker	Kevin Burke & Chris "Doc" Wyatt	October 1, 2022
205	25	"Safe Haven"	Wade Cross	Bragi Schut	October 1, 2022
206	26	"Compatible"	Daniel Ife	Kevin Burke & Chris "Doc" Wyatt	October 1, 2022
207	27	"Distress Calls"	Shane Poettcker	Kevin Burke & Chris "Doc" Wyatt	October 1, 2022
208	28	"An Issue of Trust"	Wade Cross	Bragi Schut	October 1, 2022
209	29	"Dragon Form"	Daniel Ife	Bragi Schut	October 1, 2022
210	30	"Roots"	Shane Poettcker	Bragi Schut	October 1, 2022

== Mini movies ==
Title	Episodes	Originally released	
Title	Episodes	First released	Last released
Webisodes	6	September 21, 2011	
Chen's Chair	5	July 14, 2015	August 1, 2015
Tall Tales	6	February 17, 2016	April 25, 2016
Samurai X Rising	1	February 3, 2017	
Operation Heavy Metal	4	May 23, 2017	
Wu's Teas	20	July 13, 2017	
Decoded	10	November 27, 2017	January 29, 2018
Tales from the Monastery of Spinjitzu	6	December 19, 2018	
Prime Empire Original Shorts	6	January 7, 2020	April 21, 2020
Ninjago: Reimagined	5	April 23, 2021	May 21, 2021
The Virtues of Spinjitzu	6	January 11, 2022	February 15, 2022

=== Webisodes (2011) ===
These mini movies were released in 2011 and show the lives of the ninja between the pilot episodes and the first season. They also show how Lord Garmadon was banished to the Underworld and then managed to take over.

No.	Title	Directed by	Written by	Original release date
1	"Secrets of the Blacksmith"	Peter Dodd	Tommy Andreasen	September 21, 2011
Nya gets ambushed by four Skulkin, but she fights back and defeats them.
2	"Flight of the Dragon Ninja"	Peter Dodd	Tommy Andreasen	September 21, 2011
The ninja race their dragons for the title of Dragon Master.
3	"The New Masters of Spinjitzu"	Peter Dodd	Tommy Andreasen	September 21, 2011
Kruncha and Nuckal decided to steal the ninja's Golden Weapons while they are sleeping. However, they quickly get overwhelmed by the power of the weapons, and decide to return the weapons.
4	"An Underworldly Takeover"	Michael Helmuth	Tommy Andreasen	September 21, 2011
After being defeated by Wu, Garmadon falls into the Underworld. There, he beats Samukai, the leader of the Skulkin, and takes over the Underworld.
5	"Return to the Fire Temple"	Michael Helmuth	William Thorogood	September 21, 2011
Flame takes Kai and Nya to the Fire Temple, to show them a secret path into the Underworld. The three fight a group of Skulkin and seal off the entrance.
6	"Battle Between Brothers"	Michael Helmuth	Brian Ellis	September 21, 2011
Wu and Garmadon's first duel, culminating in Garmadon's fall into the Underworld.

=== Chen's Chair (2015) ===
No.	Title	Directed by	Written by	Original release date
1	"Chen's New Chair"	Sanne Dirckinck-Holmfeld	Jeppe Sandholt	July 14, 2015
Chen received a new chair and refrained from the instructions for the buttons.
2	"Chair Play Chen"	Claus Darholt	Jeppe Sandholt	July 25, 2015
Chen plays Table Tennis against Clouse but getting frustrated for unfairly losing.
3	"Chair Up Chen"	Rolf Krarup	Jeppe Sandholt	July 25, 2015
A bored Chen faces technical difficulties with his chair.
4	"Chairful What You Wish For"	Sanne Dirckinck-Holmfeld	Jeppe Sandholt	August 1, 2015
A thirsty Chen accidentally steamed and froze himself from his chair's buttons.
5	"Bad Chair Day"	Jeppe Sandholt	Jeppe Sandholt	August 1, 2015
An excited Chen was goofing around with his chair until him and Clouse got teleported to a jungle.

=== Tall Tales (2016) ===
The Tall Tales series of shorts cover the "backstories" of the different members of Nadakhan's crew on Misfortune's Keep. However, according to Tommy Andreasen, these shorts aren't canon.

No.	Title	Directed by	Written by	Original release date
1	"The Tall Tale of Flintlocke"	Unknown	Unknown	February 17, 2016
2	"The Tall Tale of Clancee"	Unknown	Unknown	February 28, 2016
3	"The Tall Tale of Doubloon"	Unknown	Unknown	March 14, 2016
4	"The Tall Tale of Dogshank"	Unknown	Unknown	April 2, 2016
5	"The Tall Tale of Monkey Wretch"	Unknown	Unknown	April 20, 2016
6	"The Tall Tale of Squiffy and Bucko"	Unknown	Unknown	April 25, 2016

=== Samurai X Rising (2017) ===
Samurai X Rising is a short released and set during episodes 8 and 9 of season 7. It's focused on the new Samurai X.

Title	Directed by	Written by	Original release date
"Samurai X Rising"	Unknown	Unknown	February 3, 2017

=== Operation Heavy Metal (2017) ===
Operation Heavy Metal is a series of four shorts focusing on the generals of the Vermillion army. The shorts are canon to the show, taking place during season 7. They were originally released in Chinese on May 23, 2017, but Tommy Andreasen would eventually release them in English on Twitter.

No.	Title	Directed by	Written by	Original release date
1	"Operation Heavy Metal: Machia"	Unknown	Unknown	May 23, 2017
Commander Machia forces Cyrus Borg to build which became a failure.
2	"Operation Heavy Metal: Buffmillion"	Unknown	Unknown	May 23, 2017
When dancing and terrorizing Ninjago City, Buffmillion was given orders to collect metal. He failed to steal the memorial for Zane, the Titanium Ninja.
3	"Operation Heavy Metal: Blunck"	Unknown	Unknown	May 23, 2017
Blunk fails from robbing the junkyard of Jay's parents for metal.
4	"Operation Heavy Metal: Raggmunk"	Unknown	Unknown	May 23, 2017
Raggmunk tries to control his army whilst near the Megamonster park.

=== Wu's Teas (2017) ===
Wu's Teas is a series of twenty Ninjago shorts. It focuses on Wu's new tea shop, "Steeper Wisdom", and their rivalry with the coffee shop. The series can be watched as a single 20 minute "episode" or as 20 individual shorts. These shorts are not canon. The shorts were released as one episode on July 13, 2017.

No.	Title	Directed by	Written by	Original release date
1	"Secret Teas"	Anne-Marie Solling Kristensen	Jordan Dunn	July 13, 2017
The Ninja find and mess with Wu's collection of magic teas.
2	"Spinny Sign"	Benjamin Brokop	Jordan Dunn	July 13, 2017
To draw attention to Steeper Wisdom, Kai gets into a spinny-sign-off with the Robot Manager.
3	"Music Night"	Emma Hjulmand Nielsen	Jordan Dunn	July 13, 2017
4	"Music Night"	Kenneth Bonde	Jordan Dunn	July 13, 2017
Part 1: When Dareth's clarinet threatens to ruin Steeper Wisdom's music night, the Ninja try to save the night by drinking some of Wu’s Musicali-tea. Part 2: With the power of Musicali-tea, the Ninja rock the house...maybe too much. Wu sees this and realizes he hasn’t tested the tea and needs Dareth to spoil their jam with his clarinet.
5	"Names"	Kristian Haskjold	Jordan Dunn	July 13, 2017
In an attempt to one-up the coffee shop, Lloyd suggests Steeper Wisdom do the one thing no coffee shop can: get their customers' names right, or Cole gets dunked in a giant teapot. At first it goes smoothly but Lloyd somehow gets Dareth's name wrong, meaning that Dareth gets to dunk Cole.
6	"Funny Guys"	Mads Buch	Michael Kvamme	July 13, 2017
Jay gets jealous when an attractive customer starts to flirt with Nya, and turns to Wu's magic teas to make himself more interesting and attractive.
7	"Inspection Day"	Michael Helmuth Hansen	Michael Kvamme	July 13, 2017
Steeper Wisdom prepares for a visit from the Health Inspector, but things don’t go well when Kai tries to hide a full garbage bag under a loose floorboard.
8	"Panda-Monium"	Per Düring Risager	Michael Kvamme	July 13, 2017
Nya brings a baby panda into the tea shop. At first it attracts customers, but things get troublesome when it gets into one of Wu's special teas, attacking the shop and scaring the customers away.
9	"Remote Control Zane"	Per Düring Risager	Michael Kvamme	July 13, 2017
Jay, being lazy, asks Zane to do their chores. He then learns that he can use the TV remote to manipulate Zane into doing all the chores, making Zane less than thrilled about this. But when Jay drops the remote and the batteries fall out, Zane gets his revenge by freezing Jay into a block of ice.
10	"Trojan Tea Kettle"	Per Düring Risager	Michael Kvamme	July 13, 2017
Lloyd sneaks Kai into the coffee shop in a large tea kettle to infiltrate the vault and gather intel on their rival to see what is making her coffee so good. Kai eventually gets thrown into a dumpster and finds banana peels, making him realize that this was the coffee's ingredient that was making people go crazy for it.
11	"Mystery Dust"	Peter Egeberg	Mark Lester	July 13, 2017
Cole attempts to sweep the shop, but some strange moving dust is not cooperating, forcing Cole to catch the dust.
12	"Cool-Headed Kai"	Peter Hausner	Mark Lester	July 13, 2017
The stove in Steeper Wisdom is broken and Jay needs Kai's fire power to get it up and running again. But Kai, after a cup of SereniTea, is busy meditating and impossible to get in contact with. Jay attempts to make Kai angry to use his fire, but none of his plans work, until he asks Kai if he can ask Nya out on a date. This makes Kai wake up and become furious, unleashing his fire.
13	"Undercover Zane"	Peter Hausner	Mark Lester	July 13, 2017
Disguised as a coffee maintenance bot, Zane infiltrates the coffee shop in an attempt to sabotage their operations. He freezes the coffee machine to get it to stop working, but it only makes delicious iced coffee for the customers.
14	"Lloyd's Late"	Peter Hausner	Mark Lester	July 13, 2017
Lloyd tries to get to work on time to avoid getting toilet duty again, but the world seems bent on making it difficult. When he arrives, he pretends to be at the counter the whole time, but Wu isn’t convinced when he finds him.
15	"Steep Surveillance"	Rene Madsen	Mark Lester	July 13, 2017
When someone steals Wu's favorite tea, the Ninja are determined to find the culprit. Jay uses some traps and cameras to figure it out, but the enemy may be closer than they think...
16	"The Coin Toss"	Rene Madsen	Steven Wilson	July 13, 2017
Cole challenges Jay to a bet using a coin. Heads, Jay has to do both their chores. Tails, Cole leaves and doesn't have to do anything. Jay takes the bet and the coin lands on tails. As Cole leaves, Jay complains but realizes that Cole outsmarted him.
17	"Nya's Mural"	Rolf Krarup	Steven Wilson	July 13, 2017
Nya attempts to paint an advertisement on the side of the shop, but the weather keeps ruining it.
18	"Zaney Chess Game"	Trylle Vilstrup	Steven Wilson	July 13, 2017
Steeper Wisdom has a competition where whoever beats Zane in chess gets free tea. Things get intense when the Robot Manager challenges him. Eventually, the Robot Manager beats Zane, but before she can get her tea, Zane's queen slips out of her sleeve, making Zane realize that she cheated.
19	"The Taste Test"	Trylle Vilstrup	Steven Wilson	July 13, 2017
Ronin sets up a competition between the Coffee Shop and Steeper Wisdom for the prestigious Golden Mug award. The Coffee Shop wins and Ronin cheers, revealing that he owns both shops and had them compete due to publicity.
20	"A Beautiful Friendship"	Trylle Vilstrup	Steven Wilson	July 13, 2017
Wu makes peace with the Robot Manager, proving the old adage, "The best way to defeat an enemy is to make them your friend".

=== Decoded (2017–18) ===
Ninjago: Decoded is a short series that was released from November 27, 2017, to January 29, 2018. It takes place chronologically before season 8. These shorts recycle scenes from the seventh season with different voice acting, as well as clips from previous episodes. These shorts could be considered canon, according to Tommy Andreasen.

No.	Title	Directed by	Written by	Original release date
1	"Legacy"	Asa Tait & J. Rick Castañeda	Psychic Bunny Writing Team	November 27, 2017
Nya helps Zane backup memories of their adventures to the Samurai X Cave computer, but Zane encounters a mysterious puzzle buried deep within his code.
2	"Vehicles and Mechs"	Asa Tait & J. Rick Castañeda	Psychic Bunny Writing Team & Joey Clift	December 4, 2017
Nya digitizes Jay and uploads him into Zane's mind. Jay reviews memories of the Ninja's various motorcycles, mechs and planes in order to solve the vehicle-themed puzzle.
3	"Legendary Places"	Asa Tait & J. Rick Castañeda	Psychic Bunny Writing Team	December 11, 2017
Cole joins Jay and Zane inside the Nindroid to solve a mysterious puzzle by revisiting some of Ninjago's distinctive destinations.
4	"Ninjago's Most Wanted"	Asa Tait & J. Rick Castañeda	Psychic Bunny Writing Team	December 18, 2017
Kai enters Zane's mind and suggests the Ninja take a break from puzzle-solving to figure out which villain is trying to hack their friend.
5	"The Digiverse And Beyond"	Asa Tait & J. Rick Castañeda	Psychic Bunny Writing Team & Joey Clift	December 25, 2017
The team tackles a puzzle about technology in Ninjago while the threat to Zane grows graver by the minute.
6	"The Elemental Masters"	Asa Tait & J. Rick Castañeda	Psychic Bunny Writing Team	January 1, 2018
A riddle requires the Ninja to consider the powers and history of the Elemental Masters. Meanwhile, Nya struggles to keep the power on in the Samurai X Cave.
7	"Beasts and Dragons"	Asa Tait & J. Rick Castañeda	Psychic Bunny Writing Team & Joey Clift	January 8, 2018
Jay, Kai and Zane remember some of Ninjago's most fearsome creatures in order to help Cole defend the cave from an unidentified monster.
8	"Rise of Garmadon"	Asa Tait & J. Rick Castañeda	Psychic Bunny Writing Team	January 15, 2018
The Ninja confront memories of their greatest villain and ally, Garmadon, before the threat to Zane controls him completely.
9	"Prophecy of the Green Ninja"	Asa Tait & J. Rick Castañeda	Psychic Bunny Writing Team & J. Rick Castaneda	January 22, 2018
The final puzzle forces each ninja to question the true meaning of the Green Ninja Prophecy, but success is not what in seems.
10	"Greatest Battles"	Asa Tait & J. Rick Castañeda	Psychic Bunny Writing Team	January 29, 2018
Solving the puzzles releases a new peril for the Ninja to face. Will memories of their greatest victories be enough to defeat it?

=== Tales from the Monastery of Spinjitzu (2018) ===
Tales from the Monastery of Spinjitzu is a series of six canon shorts from the Lego website released on December 19, 2018, made to promote the Ninjago Legacy sets. Some are made-up flashbacks while others take place between seasons 9 and 10.

No.	Title	Directed by	Written by	Original release date
1	"Master Class"	Rolf Rolf	Tommy Andreasen	December 19, 2018
Master Wu gives the Ninja a review in Spinjitzu and they all end up being covered in gold paint. Note: This short takes place between seasons 9 and 10.
2	"Green and Gold"	Benjamin Brokop	Tommy Andreasen	December 19, 2018
Lloyd dreams of what happened to the Ultra Dragon, and finds that he returned to the First Realm. Note: The flashback takes place between seasons 2 and 3.
3	"The Weekend Drill"	Jeppe Sandholt	Tommy Andreasen	December 19, 2018
Cole, driving his newly rebuilt Earth Driller, gets called to fight the Giant Stone Warrior in Kryptarium Prison. Note: The short takes place between seasons 9 and 10.: The Fold Band appear in Prison.
4	"Elemental Rider"	Sanne Dirckinck-Holmfeld	Tommy Andreasen	December 19, 2018
Zane and Kai recall a time when they fought off some Venomari using their Golden Weapons in vehicle form. Note: The flashback takes place in season 1.
5	"Blue Lightning"	Peter Egeberg	Tommy Andreasen	December 19, 2018
Jay remembers beating Pythor off of some noodle trucks using his jet. Note: The flashback takes place sometime during season 1.
6	"Samurai X-Treme"	Peter Egeberg	Tommy Andreasen	December 19, 2018
Jay and Nya are reminded of a time when Nya fought an epic battle against skulkin in her Samurai X Mech. Note: The flashback takes place sometime during or between seasons 1 and 2.

=== Prime Empire Original Shorts (2020) ===
Prime Empire Original Shorts is a series of six canon shorts that were released on the Lego YouTube channel as a prequel to the release of the twelfth season titled Prime Empire.

No.	Title	Directed by	Written by	Original release date
1	"Let's Dance"	Jennifer Gugliemucci	Alisha Brophy & Scott Miles	January 7, 2020
Nya and Jay take a dance lesson together and then go to the arcade to play Jay's favourite game, Dancy Pants.
2	"Upgrade"	Joel Salasay	Alisha Brophy & Scott Miles	January 13, 2020
The Mechanic is robbing a bank with his noodle truck of crime and talks to a computer voice named Unagami.
3	"The Meaning of Victory"	Clint Gamble	Chato Hill	February 28, 2020
An announcer introduces the contestants of a race named the Speedway Five Billion and interviews each one before the start of the race.
4	"The Stowaway"	Juan Franzius	Chato Hill	March 2, 2020
Jay is being pursued by the Red Visors, a race that ends with him meeting a man named Scott.
5	"Manhunt"	Ashley Lynch	Chato Hill	March 3, 2020
Jay and Scott introduce themselves, but are forced to escape from the Red Visors.
6	"Gayle Gossip: A Closer Look"	Daniel Ife	Alisha Brophy & Scott Miles	April 21, 2020
Gayle Gossip is reporting on the appearance of the video game Prime Empire and interviews a line of people who are waiting to play it.

=== Ninjago: Reimagined (2021) ===
Ninjago: Reimagined is a series of five short films released on the Lego YouTube channel to celebrate the ten-year anniversary of Ninjago using a variety of animation styles. The final short, Golden Hour, is considered to be the only one canon to the show, according to both Kevin Burke and Chris "Doc" Wyatt.

No.	Title	Directed by	Written by	Original release date
1	"Golden Legend"	Ben Marsaud	Mikkel Okholm, Ben Marsaud, Kevin Burke & Chris "Doc" Wyatt	April 23, 2021
A Ninjago Legacy short film about a samurai warrior fighting a dragon. This short is animated by Sun Creature Studio.
2	"Gold Rush"	Shaofu Zhang	Andrew Chesworth, Frank Gibson, Noelle Raffaele, Shaofu Zhang, Kevin Burke & Chris "Doc" Wyatt	April 30, 2021
A Ninjago Legacy short film about Kai and Nya as they race through Ninjago City. This short is animated by Taiko Studios.
3	"A Day in the Life of a Golden Ninja"	Ridd Sorensen	Ridd Sorensen, Kevin Burke & Chris "Doc" Wyatt	May 7, 2021
A Ninjago Legacy short film about a day in the life of a Golden Ninja and a dragon. This short is animated by WildBrain Studios.
4	"Sweatin' to the Goldies"	Rich Johnson	Kevin Burke & Chris "Doc" Wyatt	May 14, 2021
A Ninjago Legacy short film about Jay and Zane as they attend the premiere of Clutch Powers' new film. This short is animated by WildBrain Studios.
5	"Golden Hour"	CC Pixels	Ryan Estabrooks, Kevin Burke & Chris "Doc" Wyatt	May 21, 2021
A Ninjago Legacy short film about the Hands of Time and their battle with Master Wu on board the Iron Doom. This short is animated by CC Pixels.

=== The Virtues of Spinjitzu (2022) ===
Master Wu teaches the ninja about the six fundamental virtues of Spinjitzu.

No.	Title	Directed by	Written by	Original release date
1	"Curiosity"	Shane Poettcker	Kevin Burke & Chris "Doc" Wyatt	January 11, 2022
Master Wu is kidnapped by a dragon and taken through a portal, so the ninja must give chase.
2	"Balance"	Juan Franzius	Kevin Burke & Chris "Doc" Wyatt	January 18, 2022
The ninja must try to rescue Master Wu by crossing a crypt guarded by a lava monster.
3	"Wisdom"	Wade Cross	Kevin Burke & Chris "Doc" Wyatt	January 25, 2022
The ninja find themselves in Prime Empire racing against the Whack Rats in the Speedway Five-Billion race while continuing to search for Master Wu.
4	"Honesty"	Wade Cross	Kevin Burke & Chris "Doc" Wyatt	February 1, 2022
The honesty of the ninja is tested in the Palace of the Ice Emperor when Jay and Kai are forced to take part in a jousting competition.
5	"Generosity"	Shane Poettcker	Kevin Burke & Chris "Doc" Wyatt	February 8, 2022
Zane must demonstrate the virtue of generosity and make a sacrifice when the ninja return to Shintaro.
6	"Courage"	Juan Franzius	Kevin Burke & Chris "Doc" Wyatt	February 15, 2022
When Master Wu is taken captive by four dragons, Kai must demonstrate the virtue of courage.

== Theatrical film ==
=== The Lego Ninjago Movie (2017) ===
Title	Directed by	Written by	Original release date
The Lego Ninjago Movie	Charlie Bean, Paul Fisher & Bob Logan	Bob Logan, Paul Fisher, William Wheeler, Tom Wheeler, Jared Stern & John Whittington; Story by : Hilary Winston, Bob Logan, Paul Fisher, William Wheeler, Tom Wheeler & The Hageman Brothers	September 22, 2017
The young teenage Green Ninja Lloyd Garmadon attempts to accept the truth about his villainous father Lord Garmadon and learn to become a true ninja warrior while a new threat emerges to endanger his homeland.

== Attraction ==
=== Master of the 4th Dimension ===
Lego Ninjago: Master of the 4th Dimension is a 12-minute 3D/4D animated short film first released on 12 January 2018 in Legoland theme parks. The short follows Wu trying to teach the ninja a lesson in perspective. The short marks the last time the ninjas' original designs prior to season 8 were used, as well as the first time where Sam Vincent voices Lloyd, replacing Jillian Michaels after seven seasons.

== See also ==
- Lloyd Garmadon
- Lego Ninjago
- Ninjago (TV series)
- The Lego Ninjago Movie
- The Lego Ninjago Movie (theme)
- The Lego Ninjago Movie Video Game
