= Lego Ninjago (video game franchise) =

Action-adventure video game franchise

- Logo for The Lego Ninjago Movie Video Game (2017)
- Genres: Action-adventure; Fighting; Beat 'em up
- Developers: The Lego Group; Hellbent Games; TT Fusion
- Publishers: TT Games; The Lego Group; Warner Bros. Interactive Entertainment
- Platforms: Android; iOS; Nintendo DS; Nintendo 3DS; Nintendo Switch; OS X (Note: Only in a few appearances.); PlayStation Vita; PlayStation 3; PlayStation 4; Wii U; Windows; Xbox 360; Xbox One; Xbox Series X/S
- First release: Lego Ninjago: Scavenger Hunt; April 1, 2011
- Latest release: Lego Legacy: Heroes Unboxed; February 27, 2020
- Parent series: Lego Ninjago

Lego Ninjago is an action-adventure video game franchise that coincides with the Ninjago line of toys. The games are usually similar to the storyline of the Ninjago television series and film, but are usually released parallel to the Ninjago media franchise.

The first game was Lego Ninjago: Scavenger Hunt which was released on April 1, 2011, worldwide for iOS and the latest game from the main series is Lego Ninjago: Ride Ninja which was released on April 26, 2018, worldwide for Android.

Lego Ninjago in total has twelve games from the main franchise. The first being Lego Ninjago: Spinjitzu Scavenger Hunt. The others include Lego Battles: Ninjago, Lego Ninjago: Rise of the Snakes, Lego Ninjago: The Final Battle, Lego Ninjago: Rebooted, Lego Ninjago: Nindroids, Lego Ninjago: Tournament, Lego Ninjago: Shadow of Ronin, Lego Ninjago: Skybound, Lego Ninjago: Wu-Cru, The Lego Ninjago Movie Video Game, and Lego Ninjago: Ride Ninja.

Lego Ninjago also has playable characters in many other video games other than the ones from the main franchise. These include Lego Universe, The Lego Movie Videogame, Lego Dimensions, Lego Worlds, Lego Brawls, and Lego Legacy: Heroes Unboxed. Lego Legacy: Heroes Unboxed is also the latest game with a Lego Ninjago appearance.

All of the games are single-player except for The Lego Ninjago Movie Video Game, and the appearances.

== Release history ==
Release timeline
2011	Lego Ninjago: Spinjitzu Scavenger Hunt
2011	Lego Battles: Ninjago
2012	Lego Ninjago: Rise of the Snakes
2013	Lego Ninjago: The Final Battle
2014	Lego Ninjago: Rebooted
2014	Lego Ninjago: Nindroids
2015	Lego Ninjago: Tournament
2015	Lego Ninjago: Shadow of Ronin
2016	Lego Ninjago: Skybound
2016	Lego Ninjago: Wu-Cru
2017	The Lego Ninjago Movie Video Game
2018	Lego Ninjago: Ride Ninja

Title	Released	Platform	Based on
Lego Ninjago: Spinjitzu Scavenger Hunt	2011	iOS	Pilot season
Lego Battles: Ninjago	2011	Nintendo DS	Pilot season
Lego Ninjago: Rise of the Snakes	2012	iOS	First season
Lego Ninjago: The Final Battle	2013	iOS	Second season
Lego Ninjago: Rebooted	2014	Android, iOS	Third season
Lego Ninjago: Nindroids	2014	Nintendo 3DS, PlayStation Vita	Third season
Lego Ninjago: Tournament	2015	Android, iOS	Fourth season
Lego Ninjago: Shadow of Ronin	2015	Android, iOS, Nintendo 3DS, PlayStation Vita	Original story; set between fourth and fifth seasons
Lego Ninjago: Skybound	2016	Android, iOS	Sixth season
Lego Ninjago: Wu-Cru	2016	Android, iOS	Original story; set between sixth season and special
Lego Ninjago: Wu-Cru	2016	Android, iOS	Updates: seventh season and movie
The Lego Ninjago Movie Video Game	2017	Nintendo Switch, PlayStation 4, Windows, Xbox One, Xbox Series X/S	Movie
Lego Ninjago: Ride Ninja	2018	Android, iOS	Eighth season

== Lego Ninjago: Spinjitzu Scavenger Hunt ==
Lego Ninjago: Spinjitzu Scavenger Hunt, the first game in the series, is an arcade fighting action video game that is both developed and published by The Lego Group, that released on April 1, 2011, worldwide for iOS. In the game, players use augmented reality to explore and collect virtual Ninjago characters and items in their surroundings. The gameplay involves completing tasks, solving puzzles, and engaging in battles within the Ninjago universe, providing an interactive experience for players. The game is based on the pilot season of the series.

Alongside the game, Lego had released a line of Ninjago Spinners, which when the player scanned the barcode of, would unlock the spinner in the game. This was similar to what was incorporated into Lego Dimensions but instead of there being a bar code to scan, there was a toy pad that came with the Starter Pack for the game, on which the player would have to but the minifigure onto the pad to unlock it in the game.

== Lego Battles: Ninjago ==
Lego Battles: Ninjago is a real-time strategy video game produced by TT Games, developed by Hellbent Games, published by Warner Bros. Interactive Entertainment and is the first Ninjago game released for a console. Like Lego Ninjago: Spinjitzu Scavenger Hunt, Lego Battles: Ninjago is also based on the pilot season of the series.

In Lego Battles: Ninjago, players command six builders and seven heroes with three unlockable versions each. They construct key buildings like the keep, brick bank, mine, barracks, and tower, the latter featuring elemental upgrades. The game's storyline revolves around ninja training and the quest for the four golden weapons, while an opposing narrative follows the skeleton army, led by Samukai, in their pursuit of the same artifacts.

== Lego Ninjago: Rise of the Snakes ==
Lego Ninjago: Rise of the Snakes is an arcade fighting beat 'em up video game both developed and published by The Lego Group, that released on March 22, 2012, worldwide for the iOS. The game serves as a sequel to Lego Ninjago: Spinjitzu Scavenger Hunt. The game is based on the first season of the series.

The story involves players teaming up to face the Serpentine. The player can play daily challenges, collect spinners and weaponry, and challenge other players to duels. The game consists of six battle maps and 75 challenges.

The Ninjago Spinners have the same connection as with Lego Ninjago: Spinjitzu Scavenger Hunt as both the games are extremely similar.

AppSafari rated the game 3/5, stating that "Rise of the Snakes is clearly an app meant for children; while some kids who are Ninjago fans will enjoy it, it's unfortunate more care wasn't put into making it fun."

== Lego Ninjago: The Final Battle ==
Transforming from Lloyd into the Golden Ninja on the mobile version of the game

Lego Ninjago: The Final Battle is a side-scrolling action-adventure video game developed by Amuzo Games and published by The Lego Group, that released on March 18, 2013, worldwide as a web game and as an app for the iOS. The game is based on the second season of the series.

The gameplay of Lego Ninjago: The Final Battle revolves around players taking on the role of characters like Lloyd, Jay, Cole, Zane, or Kai to restore peace to the Ninjago world. Across six levels set in the Ninjago universe, players engage in actions such as spinning, slashing, stomping, and smashing to combat waves of enemies.

The game allows for the development and optimization of ninja skills and weapons throughout the journey. Players can activate all four elemental weapons, transforming into the Golden Ninja. Ultimately, successful gameplay leads to achieving the status of Spinjitzu Master Sensei Wu.

Alberto Gonzalez on Vandal rated the game 5.8/10, stating that "LEGO Ninjago: The Final Battle is a simple game that serves as a complement to a toy franchise, and that fans of the franchise it represents may come to like. It is a simple, repetitive app, although also nice. It won't go down in history, but it will have us really hooked and glued to our iPhone, iPad and iPod Touch for a few minutes. For many, that is more than enough."

== Lego Ninjago: Rebooted ==
Lego Ninjago: Rebooted is a side-scrolling arcade-action video game developed by QB9 Entertainment and published by The Lego Group, that released on January 21, 2014, for iOS, and on January 23, 2014, for Android. The game also released as a web game. The game is based on the third season of the series.

In the game, the ninjas' companion, Cyrus Borg, becomes subject to possession by the Overlord, prompting a mission to ascend Borg Tower and retrieve the Technoblades. The gameplay unfolds through two distinct phases. Players have the option to either climb directly to the summit of the tower or navigate through corridors on each floor. The first approach involves the evasion of traps, precise weapon usage, and accurate jumping.

The alternative path introduces additional challenges in the form of armored supporters of the possessed Overlord. The ninja control encompasses a variety of actions, including weapon usage, jumping, rolling, climbing, and running. Achieving a checkpoint provides an extra power-up for subsequent stages.

== Lego Ninjago: Nindroids ==
Lego Ninjago: Nindroids is an action-adventure video game developed by Hellbent Games and published by TT Games and Warner Bros. Interactive Entertainment, that released on July 29, 2014, in North America and on August 1, 2014, in Europe for the Nintendo 3DS and PlayStation Vita. The game is based on the first five episodes of the third season of the series.

The main weapon in the game is the Technoblades, which were shown in the season. The game is set in New Ninjago City, where the player fights opponents in various attire throughout each level. Techno Wu and the Nindroids are among the bosses, with the Overlord being the final boss.

== Lego Ninjago: Tournament ==
Lego Ninjago: Tournament (also known as Lego Ninjago: Tournament of Elements) was an action video game developed by TT Games and Hellbent Games and published by The Lego Group. It was released on January 29, 2015, for iOS and on May 20, 2015, for Android, worldwide. The game was no longer available to play after 2018. The game revolves around the fourth season of the series.

In the game, Master Chen lures Elemental Masters to his island for the Tournament of Elements. The player's objective is to defeat the other Elemental Masters. The game consisted of 3 levels: the Dojo, Chen's Arena and the Temple Gallery.

- The Dojo: In this section of the game, Sensei Wu instructs the player on how to maneuver, strike, leap, slam, dodge, grab, punch, and use Spinjitzu. A practice test is conducted after finishing.
- Chen's Arena: The major part of the game is played here. Enemy groups use bombs, bows and arrows, and melee weapons to attack the players. The player must eliminate more opponents before the following wave begins the more waves they have finished.
- The Temple Gallery: The player can view all of the Ninjago 2015 Wave 1 Lego sets in this area. Some of the sets include 70735 and 70756.

== Lego Ninjago: Shadow of Ronin ==
Lego Ninjago: Shadow of Ronin is an action-adventure video game developed by TT Games and published by Warner Bros. Interactive Entertainment. It was released on March 24, 2015, in North America, March 25, 2015, in Australia, and on March 27, 2015, in Europe. The game takes place between the fourth and fifth seasons of the series, as the game's main antagonist is a part of fifth season of the series.

The story unfolds as Ronin, the main antagonist of the game, robs the memories of the ninjas, compelling them to embark on a journey of smashing, building, and exploration to thwart Ronin's sinister schemes. The Dark Samurai act as the antagonistic faction throughout the game. Players assume control of one of the main characters from a third-person perspective, engaging in combat with enemies and collecting Lego studs. The game boasts a roster of 68 playable characters, each offering unique variations.

== Lego Ninjago: Skybound ==
The start of the first level of the game, featuring Jay

Lego Ninjago: Skybound is a side-scrolling arcade-action video game both developed and published by The Lego Group. The game was released on January 22, 2016, for Android, and on January 25, 2016, for iOS. The game also released as a web game in the same month. The game revolves around the sixth season of the series.

The gameplay of Lego Ninjago: Skybound centers on an immersive experience within the Ninjago universe, with the central storyline revolving around Nadakhan the Djinn ensnaring the souls of ninjas in magical Djinn blades. Across a range of levels featuring floating islands and ancient temples, players endeavor to free their fellow ninjas and thwart the plans of Nadakhan.

The plot involves playing as the main protagonist, Jay, to stop Nadakhan and his Sky Pirates from stealing parts of Ninjago and rebuilding his realm, Djinjago.

== Lego Ninjago: Wu-Cru ==
Lego Ninjago: Wu-Cru is an action-adventure video game developed by Cape Copenhagen and The Lego Group, and also published by the latter. The game was released on July 27, 2016, for Android, and on September 2, 2016, for iOS.

The game's plot involves Dark Matter Crystals erupting from the ground around a tea farm, and the disappearance of the other ninja who set out to investigate the case. Which leaves a new ninja (the player) to investigate the case, who is also guided by Sensei Wu, players navigate through challenges, battles, and puzzles to defeat enemies and restore harmony to the world. The game had two updates, both being major.

The game (at least before any major update) takes place between the sixth season of the series, and Day of the Departed, a special short-film.

=== Hands of Time update ===
Lego Ninjago: Hands of Time is the first major update to Lego Ninjago: Wu-Cru. The update was released alongside the seventh season of the series. There are not many major changes to the game. One of the few major changes being the logo change, which changed from the Wu-Cru art to a cover with Kai and Nya with their masks on, both being the main protagonists of the season. This version is said to take place within the season.

=== Lego Ninjago: Movie ===
Lego Ninjago: Movie is the second update to Lego Ninjago: Wu-Cru. The gameplay is similar to that of its predecessor, but with new levels, villains, hub, and characters. The game released on 25 September 2017, for Android, shortly after the release of The Lego Ninjago Movie and The Lego Ninjago Movie Video Game. The update later released for iOS on November 3, 2017. The game also brought a new title, which is also the update name. The game also brought a new logo, featuring Lloyd and Garmadon from the film.

== The Lego Ninjago Movie Video Game ==
The Lego Ninjago Movie Video Game is an action-adventure video game developed by TT Fusion and published by Warner Bros. Interactive Entertainment. The game is based on The Lego Ninjago Movie. It was released for the Nintendo Switch, PlayStation 4, Windows, and Xbox One, alongside the film, in North America on 22 September 2017, and worldwide on 20 October 2017. The game was later available for the Xbox Series X/S via backward compatibility.

The game features eight locations from The Lego Ninjago Movie. Each location contains a unique Challenge Dojo where players can test combat skills while battling increasingly tougher enemies and a single boss. The player controls one of the main characters from a third-person perspective, primarily fighting enemies, solving puzzles, and collecting Lego 'studs', the game's form of currency.

== Lego Ninjago: Ride Ninja ==
Lego Ninjago: Ride Ninja is an action-racing video game developed by Amuzo Games and published by The Lego Group. It was released on April 26, 2018, for Android, and on May 4, 2018, for iOS. The game revolves around the eighth season of the series.

The gameplay introduces players to a new narrative within the Ninjago universe, where ninja warriors face a fresh threat, prompting a journey through diverse environments to confront adversaries. The central storyline revolves around the ninjas utilizing their distinctive skills and vehicles to navigate challenges, defeat enemies, and uphold peace in Ninjago.

Throughout the gameplay, users partake in a series of challenges, battles, and exploration, drawing inspiration from the eighth season of the series. The unfolding narrative mirrors the efforts of the ninja to counter the emerging threat, providing players with an immersive experience that seamlessly combines elements of action, strategy, and adventure within the Ninjago universe.

== Appearances ==
Ninjago makes appearances in eight games other than the ones from the main franchise. Those being Lego Universe, The Lego Movie Videogame, Lego Dimensions, Lego Worlds, Lego Brawls, Lego Legacy: Heroes Unboxed, and Fortnite.

=== Lego Universe ===
The Ninjago Monastery, as shown in Lego Universe, with Jay, Kai, Zane, and Cole

On 20 September 2011, the Ninjago Monastery add-on pack was introduced to Lego Universe. In the game, Kai, Jay, Zane, Cole, and Sensei Wu are playable, along with a new Elemental Master known as Neido, the Elemental Master of Imagination. Lloyd does not make an appearance in this game as the Ninjago theme in the game is only based on the pilot season of the series.

The main playable character being Neido, with the most missions. The Skulkin play the part of the antagonists of the Ninjago theme in Lego Universe. A battle against Lord Garmadon in the fire temple was planned (and advertised) to be added into the game, but was not rolled out as a result of the server shutdown in January 2012.

=== The Lego Movie Videogame ===
In The Lego Movie Videogame, Lloyd appears as a playable character who can use the game's pink and blue agility marks to get through the game. He is the only male character in the game to be able to use the pink and blue agility marks.

In the game, Lloyd is referred to as the 'Green Ninja' with two twin golden katanas as weapons.

=== Lego Dimensions ===
In Lego Dimensions, Ninjago appears as one of the Year 1 franchises in the game. The Ninjago part of the game takes place during the fourth season of the series. In the game, Kai, Jay, Zane, Cole, Lloyd, Sensei Wu, Nya, Sensei Garmadon, P.I.X.A.L., and Dareth are playable. Skylor was going to playable, but was scrapped during the development of the game.

Unplayable characters include the villains, Chen, Clouse, etc., the other Elemental Masters, including Griffin Turner, Jacob Pevsner and Gravis. There are many Ninjago-based locations, including Ed & Edna's Scrap N Junk, Chen's Noodle House, etc., and many Ninjago-based vehicles. There are also three Ninjago levels.

=== Lego Worlds ===
Lego Worlds is a sandbox video game which allows players to build a world made up of Lego bricks. Ninjago characters are playable in Lego Worlds. Some of the playable characters are Kai, Zane, Lloyd, Jay, Cole Master Wu, Nya, an Anacondrai Cultist, Chen, and a Nindroid. There are also 11 Ninjago builds in the game. There are also weapons, dragons, and vehicles.

=== Lego Brawls ===
In Lego Brawls, Ninjago plays an important role. There were four major updates for Ninjago, the first being the one for the twelfth season, Prime Empire. The second was for the Ninjago special, Ninjago Legacy, which was divided into two mini-series, Tales from the Monastery of Spinjitzu, and Ninjago: Reimagined. The third was for the fourteenth season, Seabound. The latest update being for the new Ninjago series, Dragons Rising. There are many Ninjago characters from all of the seasons listed above.

=== Lego Legacy: Heroes Unboxed ===
Lego Legacy: Heroes Unboxed is a turn-based strategy video game which has Ninjago characters playable in it. The game has Jay, having his suit from Prime Empire, Kai and Zane having their Stone Armor suits which were used in the last episode of Rebooted, but the style is post Hands of Time. Lloyd and Nya having their suits from Possession, Cole having the suit he used from Prime Empire to Crystalized, which leaves Lord Garmadon, Master Wu, and Misako having their suits from The Lego Ninjago Movie.

There is also a character named 'Great White' who was one of Garmadon's henchmen in the movie. The game also has three sets and three character categories for Ninjago.

=== Fortnite ===
In December 2025, characters Kai, Jay, Cole, and Zane made appearances in the videogame Fortnite. It was also confirmed that a second part of this collaboration would be released in 2026.
