= The Lego Ninjago Movie Video Game =

2017 action-adventure game

- Developer: TT Fusion
- Publisher: Warner Bros. Interactive Entertainment
- Series: Lego Ninjago
- Platforms: Nintendo Switch; PlayStation 4; Windows; Xbox One
- Release: NA: 22 September 2017; EU: 6 October 2017 (PS4, XBO); EU: 13 October 2017 (PC); EU: 20 October 2017 (NS); WW: 20 October 2017
- Genre: Action-adventure
- Modes: Single-player, multiplayer

The Lego Ninjago Movie Video Game is a Lego-themed action-adventure video game developed by TT Fusion and published by Warner Bros. Interactive Entertainment. Based on The Lego Ninjago Movie, it was released for Nintendo Switch, PlayStation 4, Windows, and Xbox One, alongside the film, in North America on 22 September 2017, and worldwide on 20 October 2017. It serves as the second spin-off video game and the third game in The Lego Movie franchise.

During the COVID-19 pandemic, TT Games announced the game would be available to redeem for free from 15 to 21 May 2020 on PlayStation 4, Xbox One and PC.

== Gameplay ==
The Lego Ninjago Movie Video Game's gameplay is very similar to that of other TT Games-developed Lego games, as well as its two predecessors: Nindroids and Shadow of Ronin. As with The Lego Movie Videogame, environments are made out of Lego bricks. The player controls one of the main characters from a third-person perspective, primarily fighting enemies, solving puzzles, and collecting Lego 'studs', the game's form of currency. Using attack combinations in combat will multiply the number of studs earned. Unlike other Lego video games, which have two player cooperative modes, this game allows up four players to play in "Battle Maps" mode. 102 playable characters are featured from both the film and the original series.

The game features eight locations from The Lego Ninjago Movie. Each location contains a unique Challenge Dojo where players can test combat skills while battling increasingly tougher enemies and a single boss.

== Reception ==
Reception

Aggregate score
Aggregator	Score		
Aggregator	NS	PS4	Xbox One
Metacritic	66/100	67/100	76/100

Review scores
Publication	Score		
Publication	NS	PS4	Xbox One
4Players	N/A	79%	79%
Computer Games Magazine	N/A	6/10	N/A
Eurogamer	5/10	5/10	5/10
Game Informer	N/A	N/A	8.25/10
IGN	7.8/10	7.8/10	7.8/10
Nintendo Life	5/10	N/A	N/A
Nintendo World Report	6.5/10	N/A	N/A
PlayStation Official Magazine – UK	N/A	7/10	N/A
Push Square	N/A	7/10	N/A
Gamereactor	8/10	8/10	8/10
PS4 Source	N/A	7.4/10	N/A

The game received generally mixed reviews upon release according to review aggregator website Metacritic, with only the Xbox One version receiving "generally positive" reviews.

German online video game magazine PS4 Source gave the game 7.4 out of 10 points, praising its multiplayer mode and sound, while criticizing the noticeable screen tearing and the low graphical improvements of the PlayStation 4 Pro version.

Steve Bowling for Nintendo Life gave the game a five out of 10 points for the Nintendo Switch version and commented, "Lego games are typically quite good. Movie franchise games are typically quite bad. The Lego Ninjago Movie Video Game is, both, but ultimately it feels more like a movie game than a Lego game. Poor level design, long load times and bugs make for a game that doesn't realise its full potential; funny dialogue and entertaining movie clips can't elevate this one to greatness. If you're looking for a great Lego game for your Switch, stick to Undercover for now."

Andrew Reiner for Game Informer gave the game a 8.25/10 for Xbox One version and commented, "The Lego Ninjago Movie Video Game ends up being a relatively small step forward for Lego games, but is an excellent use of the Ninjago license, making its high-flying ninjas feel powerful and unique."

Brandon Marlow for Push Square gave the game a 7/10 for the PlayStation 4 version and commented, "The Lego Ninjago Movie Video Game is another good entry in the Lego series of games. The increased focus on combat pays off with a fleshed out system that makes each character feel unique, while the free-running provides enough safety nets to keep you from getting frustrated. Despite a couple of technical hiccups and a poorly thought out ending, Lego Ninjago has so much going for it that the overall experience isn't dampened."

Adam Abou-Nasr for Nintendo World Report gave the game a 6.5 out of 10 points for the Nintendo Switch version and commented, "Story missions seem pretty darn linear, but the results screen always taunted me with an impossible number of missed collectibles."

David Chapman for Common Sense Media gave the game a three out of five star rating and commented, "While The Lego Ninjago Movie Video Game follows the general formula of the rest of the Lego games, there are a few tweaks and additions meant to make it stand out. For starters, this game is a lot more combat-focused than others. Players zip back and forth between enemies, building up combos in fluid motions, and taking out enemies in fight scenes that would do a martial arts movie proud. The Battle Maps are a fun way to duke it out with friends and family, and the Challenge Dojo helps players perfect their ninja reflexes. Still, even with the new modes, the game feels small in comparison to other Lego games. The cast of characters, though diverse, feels light, and the story mode can be completed start-to-finish in a day. It's not that the game is bad, it's just that it doesn't feel like there's enough of it."

== See also ==
- Lego Ninjago (video game franchise)
- The Lego Movie Videogame
- The Lego Movie 2 Videogame
- Lego Battles: Ninjago
- Lego Ninjago: Nindroids
- Lego Ninjago: Shadow of Ronin
- Lego Dimensions
- Lego Brawls
- Lego Legacy: Heroes Unboxed
