= Lego (disambiguation) =

Lego is a brand of plastic construction toys.

Lego may also refer to:

== Arts and entertainment ==
- "Lego" (James May's Toy Stories), a 2009 television episode
- Lego, 2000, by death metal band Sadist
- "Lego", on The Maccabees' 2007 indie album Colour It In
- "Lego", 2011, by rapper Lady Leshurr

== Places ==
- Leego, Somalia
- Lego, West Virginia, United States

== Other uses ==
- LEGO (proof assistant), a software tool
- Lego (musician), a Sakalava musician

== See also ==
- Legoland (disambiguation)
- Lego House (disambiguation)
- Lego Ninjago (disambiguation)
- Legco, or legislative council
- List of Lego films and TV series
- List of Lego video games
- List of Lego themes
- Leggo (disambiguation)
