= Leggo (disambiguation) =

Leggo is an Italian newspaper.

Leggo may also refer to:

== Surname ==
- Carl Leggo (1953–2019), Canadian poet and scholar
- Mike Leggo (born 1964), National Hockey League referee
- Tom Leggo (1892–1958), Australian rugby player
- William Leggo (1830–1915), Canadian inventor

== Other uses ==
- "Leggo" (song), the debut single of B. Smyth
- Leggo, Mississippi, a ghost town

== See also ==
- Lego (disambiguation)
  - Lego, Danish toys
