= Ninjago: Masters of Spinjitzu pilot episodes =

Danish animated television season

Ninjago: Masters of Spinjitzu
- Season Pilot
- Pilot Episodes DVD cover art
- Starring: Vincent Tong; Michael Adamthwaite; Brent Miller; Kirby Morrow; Kelly Metzger; Paul Dobson; Mark Oliver
- No. of episodes: 2 (later split into 4)

Release
- Original network: Cartoon Network
- Original release: January 14, 2011

Season chronology
- Next → Rise of the Snakes

The pilot episodes (also known as the pilot season) are the first installments of the Ninjago: Masters of Spinjitzu animated television series (titled Ninjago from the eleventh season onward). The series was co-created by Tommy Andreasen. It focuses on the adventures of four teenage ninja who live in the fictional world of Ninjago and fight against the forces of evil.

In the United States, the two pilot episodes of Ninjago: Masters of Spinjitzu, later split into four episodes in total, were shown on Cartoon Network on January 14, 2011. They were released in Europe on January 24, 2011. Following the popularity of the pilot episodes, the first season titled Rise of the Snakes was launched from December 2011 to April 2012. The pilot episodes were released on DVD in March 2011, and the first season became available on DVD in Region 1 on June 26, 2012. Each pilot episode has a runtime of 11 minutes, totalling 22 minutes when combined into two episodes. The 22-minute format remained consistent throughout the series until the release of the eleventh season titled Secrets of the Forbidden Spinjitzu, when it was reduced to 11 minutes.

The pilot episodes introduce five of the show's six main teenage ninja characters named Kai, Cole, Jay, Zane and Nya and their wise master, Sensei Wu that would remain the central characters of the series. The storyline focuses on main ninja character Kai trying to save his sister Nya from the Skulkin and his efforts to stop the villainous Lord Garmadon from obtaining the four Golden Weapons of Spinjitzu.

== Voice cast ==
=== Main ===
- Vincent Tong as Kai, the Red Ninja and Elemental Master of Fire, the main protagonist of the pilot episodes
- Michael Adamthwaite as Jay, the Blue Ninja and Elemental Master of Lightning
- Brent Miller as Zane, the White Ninja and Elemental Master of Ice
- Kirby Morrow as Cole, the Black Ninja and Elemental Master of Earth
- Kelly Metzger as Nya, Kai's sister
- Paul Dobson as Sensei Wu, the wise teacher of the ninja
- Mark Oliver as Lord Garmadon, the main antagonist of the pilot episodes

=== Recurring ===
- Michael Kopsa as Samukai, the Skulkin leader
- Brian Drummond as Nuckal and Kruncha

== Production ==
=== Development ===
The pilot episodes were released after two years of planning following a concept drawing by co-creator Tommy Andreasen that featured five elemental ninjas. Within the first year of development, further concept art was created that depicted the Skulkin and Lord Garmadon as the main antagonists. The concept work also included the idea of a fictional martial art that was initially called "Spinjago" and later renamed as "Spinjitzu". The Hageman Brothers developed the storyline as a serialised drama set within a fantasy world that would be similar to "one giant movie or a miniseries". The pilot episodes introduce skeletons as the main antagonists, which was the result of extensive research with children conducted by The Lego Group during the development of the Lego Ninjago brand. Skeletons were chosen as the preferred option, as the children considered them to be "real" fantasy villains.

=== Animation ===
The series was animated from the pilot episodes until the tenth season by Wil Film ApS in Denmark.

=== Launch ===
The television series was designed to launch the Lego Ninjago product line, which runs alongside the series. It was originally planned as a three-year project that was intended to end after the second season. However, due to its popularity and success in the first year, the Lego Ninjago brand was continued indefinitely and has been in production ever since. The series was eventually replaced in 2023 by a new series titled Dragons Rising.

== Synopsis ==
"Long before time had a name", the First Spinjitzu Master created the realm of Ninjago using the four Golden Weapons of Spinjitzu. Before he passed, his two sons swore to protect the weapons from evil, but the older brother, Garmadon, was consumed by darkness and aimed to wield all four weapons so that he could recreate Ninjago in his own image. In the ensuing battle between brothers, the younger brother Wu cast Garmadon down to the Underworld and hid the weapons across Ninjago, placing a dragon to guard each hiding spot. Sensei Wu found four teenage ninja to find the Golden Weapons to save Ninjago from Garmadon and his Skulkin army.

== Episodes ==
No. overall	No. in season	Title	Directed by	Written by	Original release date
P1	P1	"Way of the Ninja"	Michael Hegner & Justin Murphy	The Hageman Brothers	January 14, 2011
Sibling blacksmiths, Kai and Nya, meet a mysterious old man, Master Wu, who seeks their help against the threat of his brother Garmadon and his new army of Skulkin who dominate the Underworld. After Nya is abducted by the skulkin and their leader, Samukai, Kai joins Wu's three other students, Jay, Zane, and Cole, in the hopes of rescuing her. Note: This episode was released in some regions as a 22-minute episode along with "The Golden Weapon".
P2	P2	"The Golden Weapon"	Justin Murphy	The Hageman Brothers	January 14, 2011
On their quest to find and protect the Golden Weapons of Spinjitzu, the ninja travel to the Caves of Despair to obtain the first Golden Weapon, the Scythe of Quakes, but the Skulkin are already there. The Scythe is also protected by an earth dragon. Note: This episode was released in some regions as a 22-minute episode along with "Way of the Ninja".
P3	P3	"King of Shadows"	Justin Murphy	The Hageman Brothers	January 14, 2011
The ninja successfully recover three of the four Golden Weapons from their guardian dragons, leaving only the Sword of Fire. Garmadon uses Nya to lure Kai into an ambush at the Fire Temple, while Samukai steals the golden weapons from the other ninja. Wu saves Kai and Nya from Garmadon's shadow, then takes the Sword of Fire into the Underworld to keep it separated from the other Golden Weapons. Note: This episode was released in some regions as a 22-minute episode along with "Weapons of Destiny".
P4	P4	"Weapons of Destiny"	Justin Murphy	The Hageman Brothers	January 14, 2011
Samukai and the Skulkin army return to the Underworld with the Golden Weapons, and the ninja follow them, by riding on the backs of the guardian dragons. In the Underworld, they defeat the Skulkin using the Tornado of Creation. Samukai fights Wu and takes the Sword of Fire, but the combined power of the golden weapons proves to be too much for him. A portal to an unknown realm is created in the process, which Garmadon uses to escape the Underworld. Note: This episode was released in some regions as a 22-minute episode along with "King of Shadows".

== Reception ==
=== Accolades ===
In 2012, the composers Michael Kramer and Jay Vincent won the BMI Film & TV Music Awards.

=== Critical reception ===
Lien Murakami for Common Sense Media gave the show a 3 out of 5 star rating, commenting that it, "is packed with lots of cartoon martial arts battles involving ninjas, skeletons, and guardian monsters, but the action is completely bloodless and at times humorous." The review also noted that the show, "mainly focuses on the red "fire" ninja Kai and his hero's journey from hot-headed teen to focused team member. Older viewers will be familiar with this well-worn story." The review also remarked, "The animation is smooth and colorful, and the exciting martial arts sequences make the most of the blocky little characters and their "clip" hands. The plot moves along at a decent pace; if anything, it's sometimes a bit too fast. And characters learn lessons of teamwork and patience thanks to the wise and respectable Sensei Wu. Better still, it's full of silly, winking humor, thereby making the peril seem less intense."

=== Ratings ===
The pilot episodes were the highest rated program with boys in their time slot across multiple airings.

== Legacy ==
Since the launch and success of the pilot episodes, the series has spawned a media franchise that includes video games, publications and theme park attractions and the production of the 2017 film The Lego Ninjago Movie, which was the third film of The Lego Movie franchise.

== Mini-movies ==
The pilot episodes were followed by six 3 minute mini-movies that were released in 2011. The titles of the mini-movies were Flight of the Dragon Ninja, Secrets of the Blacksmith, The New Masters of Spinjitzu, Battle Between Brothers, Return to the Fire Temple and An Underworldly Takeover.

== Video game adaptations ==
A mobile game titled Lego Ninjago: Spinjitzu Scavenger Hunt was released on April 1, 2011, for the iOS.

A video game based on the pilot special titled Lego Battles: Ninjago was released on April 12, 2011, exclusively for the Nintendo DS. It was also a spin-off sequel to Lego Battles.

== See also ==
- List of Ninjago characters
- Lego Ninjago (video game franchise)
