= Lego House (disambiguation) =

"Lego House" is a 2011 song by Ed Sheeran.

Lego House may also refer to:

- Lego House (Billund), opened in 2017
- The Lego House, another name for the Lilla Bommen building in Sweden, also known as "The Lipstick"

== See also ==
- James May's Lego House, 2010 book about the house built for Toy Stories
