= Ninjago: Rise of the Snakes =

Danish animated television season

- Season 1
- Rise of the Snakes poster
- Starring: Jillian Michaels; Vincent Tong; Michael Adamthwaite; Brent Miller; Kirby Morrow; Kelly Metzger; Paul Dobson; Mark Oliver
- No. of episodes: 13

Release
- Original network: Cartoon Network
- Original release: December 2, 2011 – April 11, 2012

Season chronology
- ← Previous; Pilot episodes Next → Legacy of the Green Ninja

Rise of the Snakes (also titled Rise of the Serpentine on the DVD release) is the first season of the animated television series Ninjago: Masters of Spinjitzu (titled Ninjago from the eleventh season onward). Michael Hegner and Tommy Andreasen created the series. It revolves around the adventures of four teenage ninja who live in the fictional world of Ninjago and fight against the forces of evil. The season aired from December 2, 2011 to April 11, 2012 following the pilot episodes. It was succeeded by the second season, titled Legacy of the Green Ninja.

Rise of the Snakes introduces the central character Lloyd Garmadon (voiced by Jillian Michaels). It follows the story arc of the character's development to becoming the prophesied Green Ninja. In this season, Lloyd is depicted as a young boy who serves as a minor antagonist to the ninja team. The storyline focuses on his attempts to become an evil warlord by taking control of five Serpentine tribes before turning from the path of evil. Lord Garmadon returns as an unlikely ally of the Ninja Team, Pythor P. Chumsworth is introduced as the season's main antagonist and a legendary snake named the Great Devourer is introduced as the season's overarching antagonist. The season also develops the character of Nya as she maintains a secret identity as the mysterious Samurai X.

== Voice cast ==
=== Main ===
- Jillian Michaels as Lloyd Garmadon, the Green Ninja and Elemental Master of Energy
- Vincent Tong as Kai, the Red Ninja and Elemental Master of Fire
- Michael Adamthwaite as Jay, the Blue Ninja and Elemental Master of Lightning
- Brent Miller as Zane, the White Ninja and Elemental Master of Ice
- Kirby Morrow as Cole, the Black Ninja and Elemental Master of Earth
- Kelly Metzger as Nya, Kai's sister
- Paul Dobson as Sensei Wu, the wise teacher of the ninja
- Mark Oliver as Lord Garmadon

=== Recurring ===
- Ian James Corlett as Skales
- Michael Dobson as Pythor P. Chumsworth
- Paul Dobson as Acidicus
- Mark Oliver as Dr. Julien
- Colin Murdock as Ed
- Jillian Michaels as Edna
- Brian Drummond as Kruncha and Nuckal
- Kirby Morrow as Lou
- Mackenzie Gray as Mistaké
- Mackenzie Gray as Fangtom
- John Novak as Slithraa

== Production ==
=== Development ===
The Hageman Brothers, who were the writers for the series from its initial launch until the tenth season, developed the idea for the character of Lloyd. Series co-creator Tommy Andreasen stated that Lloyd's story arc as the Green Ninja was conceived immediately after the character was created, although the mystery of the identity of the Green Ninja was built up over the course of ten episodes and finally revealed in the episode titled The Green Ninja.

=== Animation ===
The animation for the first season was produced at Wil Film ApS in Denmark. The season was created with a 22-minute format that would continue until the release of the eleventh season.

=== Direction ===
The episodes for Rise of the Snakes were directed by Peter Hausner, Justin Murphy and Martin Skov.

== Release ==
The first and second episode of the season titled Rise of the Snakes was released on December 2, 2011 on Cartoon Network as a sneak peek until January 18, 2011. The subsequent episodes were released throughout the following months until the season finale Day of the Great Devourer, which was released on April 11, 2012.

== Synopsis ==
The mischievous son of Lord Garmadon named Lloyd mistakenly opened many of the five serpentine tribes and got tricked by an Anacondrai named Pythor. The Ninja team Kai, Jay, Zane and Cole tried to discover the true identity of the Green Ninja; and to stop Pythor and the five serpentine tribes from finding the four Fang Blades to unleash the Great Devourer that originally bit Garmadon with its venom as a child.

== Episodes ==
No. overall	No. in season	Title	Directed by	Written by	Original release date	U.S. viewers (millions)
1	1	"Rise of the Snakes"	Peter Hausner	The Hageman Brothers	December 2, 2011	N/A
Peace has returned to Ninjago and the Ninja have grown complacent. Rumours of Lord Garmadon's return prompt them to investigate, but they only find Garmadon's son, Lloyd Montgomery Garmadon, who escaped boarding school, causing mischief. Driven by a desire to become the evil warlord like his father, Lloyd fortuitously uncovers the Tomb of the Hypnobrai Tribe of the Serpentine and releases them. The Ninja come across the prophecy of the legendary ‘’Green Ninja’’ and, believing one of them is destined to become him, begin fighting amongst themselves, while the Serpentine attack Jamanakai Village.
2	2	"Home"	Justin Murphy	The Hageman Brothers	December 2, 2011	N/A
The Ninja resume their training preparing for the looming threat of the Serpentine. A mysterious Falcon leads Zane to a treehouse, built for Lloyd by the Hypnobrai. The Ninja confront Lloyd and the snakes, leaving the Monastery unguarded. Upon returning, they find the Monastery had been burned by the Hypnobrai, but Zane and the Falcon again, find them a new home – a ship called the ‘’Destiny’s Bounty’’.
3	3	"Snakebit"	Martin Skov	The Hageman Brothers	January 25, 2012	1.77
Cast out by the Hypnobrai's new General, Skales, Lloyd releases the Fangpyre Tribe from their tomb and leads them against the hypnobrai. While settling in the Destiny's Bounty and preparing it to be their new headquarters, the Ninja are visited by Jay’s parents – Ed and Edna. When the Fangpyre Raid Ed and Edna's junkyard, looking for vehicles to convert into weapons, Jay must rush to save his parents from their transforming venom.
4	4	"Never Trust a Snake"	Peter Hausner	The Hageman Brothers	February 1, 2012	2.47
After a meeting with Skales, the Fangpyre refuse to fight the Hypnobrai and the two tribes join forces. Looking for new allies, Lloyd releases Pythor – the last of the Anacondrai Tribe. Pythor initially pretends to be his friend, but eventually betrays him too, stealing his map that shows the locations of the two remaining snakes tribes. Sensei Wu takes Lloyd under his wing.
5	5	"Can of Worms"	Justin Murphy	The Hageman Brothers	February 8, 2012	1.99
Lloyd moves in and plays pranks on the Ninja (including turning Zane's ninja suit pink) to trick them into fighting amongst themselves. Wu encourages him, hoping to teach the Ninja a lesson about unity. Meanwhile, Pythor releases the Venomari and Constrictai Tribes from their tombs and plans to unite them under his leadership. The Ninja infiltrate their meeting and, inspired by Lloyd's pranks, manipulate the tribes into fighting each other. Pythor discovers them and they are nearly captured, but Zane's pink suit enables them to hide and escape.
6	6	"The Snake King"	Martin Skov	The Hageman Brothers	February 15, 2012	2.18
Pythor finds the ancient Serpentine city of Ouroboros and declares himself to be the Snake King, the destined leader who will reawaken The Great Devourer – an ancient, seemingly immortal beast who will consume all of Ninjago. Lloyd, who witnesses all this, is discovered and imprisoned. The Ninja, now wearing new ZX suits, attempt to rescue him, but are nearly captured themselves, only to be saved by the mysterious Samurai X, who Kai discovers to be his younger sister Nya.
7	7	"Tick Tock"	Peter Hausner	The Hageman Brothers	February 22, 2012	2.44
When the four Ninja follow the mysterious Falcon into the woods, they stumble on a hidden workshop where Zane learns the secret about his past; he is a nindroid designed to 'protect those who cannot protect themselves', as said by his deceased father and creator. The discovery of his past allows Zane to become the first Ninja to unlock his True Potential to defeat a giant deer monster known as the Treehorn Queen. Meanwhile, Master Wu travels to the Realm of Madness to find his older brother Lord Garmadon.
8	8	"Once Bitten, Twice Shy"	Justin Murphy	The Hageman Brothers	March 7, 2012	2.21
Jay and Nya have to cut their first date in the Mega-Monster Amusement Park short as the Serpentine arrive to retrieve the first of the four Fang Blades needed to awaken the Great Devourer. To make matters worse, Jay pricks his hand on the fang of a skeletal Fangpyre, triggering a transformation. The other three ninja fail to stop Pythor and the Serpentine from retrieving the first Fangblade. Jay unlocks his True Potential to save Nya and overcoming the transformation, while Nya reveals her Samurai X identity. In the Realm of Madness, Wu finds Lord Garmadon, now with four arms, and tells him that Lloyd has been captured, much to Garmadon's worried for his son.
9	9	"The Royal Blacksmiths"	Martin Skov	The Hageman Brothers	March 14, 2012	1.76
The four Ninja go undercover as a dance troupe, and enter a talent contest in their quest to win the "Blade Cup", in which one of the Fangblades is hidden, taken from its tomb by Clutch Powers. They ask Cole's father to train them, the leader of one particularly famous dance troupe, the “Royal Blacksmiths”, who turns out to be more demanding than Sensei Wu. Lacking confidence in their chances, Cole contemplates stealing the cup, but is berated by his father and decides to make him proud by winning the cup. Pythor collapses the stage and steals the cup, while Cole unlocks his True Potential and saves his father. Garmadon returns to Ninjago with Sensei Wu.
10	10	"The Green Ninja"	Peter Hausner	The Hageman Brothers	March 21, 2012	2.62
The Ninja are suspicious when Lord Garmadon moves in to help search for his missing son, but realize they have to work together in their attempt to rescue Lloyd from the Serpentine while they dig for the third Fangblade in the heart of the Fire Temple. Kai, after being held back by his ambition to become the Green Ninja, unlocks his True Potential and rescues Lloyd. It is also revealed, through Kai's own realization, that Lloyd is the true destined Green Ninja. This causes grief to both Wu and Garmadon, since their family has now been further divided, because one day Lloyd will have to fight his father to save Ninjago.
11	11	"All of Nothing"	Justin Murphy	The Hageman Brothers	March 28, 2012	2.02
At a suggestion from Lloyd to steal back the three Fangblades as Pythor goes for the fourth and lasted, the Ninja and Sensei Wu try to infiltrate the inner sanctum of the Serpentine and walk right into a trap. When Lloyd's rescue mission does not go as planned, it is up to Lord Garmadon to save them. Garmadon and the Skulkin Army battle against Pythor and the Serpentine, allowing Lloyd to release the Ninja and get the Fangblades. Garmadon leaves Lloyd to follow his own path and the Ninja celebrates his victory as they plans to destroy the Fangblades, but whihout learning that Pythor follows them in secret.
12	12	"The Rise of the Great Devourer"	Martin Skov	The Hageman Brothers	April 4, 2012	1.90
Upon arriving at Torchfire Mountain, the only place where the Fangblades can be destroyed, Pythor reveals himself and steals the blades back, leaving the Ninja to die. Nya saves them, as Samurai X, and they head to the lost City of Ouroboros to try to stop Pythor. After a battle on a Serpentine Truck-fortress, all arrive in the city. Pythor finally awakens the Great Devourer, but Sensei Wu pins him in place and forces him to watch what he unleashed. Unable to escape, they are both swallowed by the Great Devourer.
13	13	"Day of the Great Devourer"	Peter Hausner	The Hageman Brothers	April 11, 2012	3.34
The Ninja must fight to save Ninjago. In the end, only Lord Garmadon, using the four Golden Weapons, can destroy the Great Devourer. He manages to kill the giant snake and Wu is shown to have survived, but Lord Garmadon vanishes with the Golden Weapons and Lloyd must accept the fact that he must face him one day.

== Ratings ==
The first season of Ninjago: Masters of Spinjitzu, which was released on Cartoon Network, achieved the top position on Wednesday nights from 7 to 9 pm with children aged 2–11 and 9–14.

== Accolades ==
Director Peter Hausner was nominated in the category of "Directing in a Television Production" at the Annie Awards in 2012.

== Other media ==
The season was accompanied by a related app titled Rise of the Snakes, which was released for iOS on March 22, 2012. The game involves fighting as one of the main ninja characters against the Serpentine and includes six battle arenas.

== See also ==
- List of Ninjago characters
- Lego Ninjago
- Lego Ninjago (video game franchise)
