= Lego Ninjago: Shadow of Ronin =

2015 video game

- Developers: TT Games; TT Fusion
- Publisher: Warner Bros. Interactive Entertainment
- Director: Jon Burton
- Producer: Paul Johnson
- Designers: Mike Taylor; Rob Shepherd
- Artists: John Lomax; Rory Payton
- Series: Lego Ninjago
- Platforms: Nintendo 3DS; PlayStation Vita; iOS; Android
- Release: PlayStation Vita, Nintendo 3DS: NA: March 24, 2015; AU: March 25, 2015; EU: March 27, 2015; Android: WW: December 2, 2015; iOS: WW: January 20, 2016
- Genre: Action-adventure
- Mode: Single-player

Lego Ninjago: Shadow of Ronin is an action-adventure handheld video game developed by TT Games and published by Warner Bros. Interactive Entertainment. It was released on March 24, 2015, in North America, March 25, 2015, in Australia, March 27, 2015, in Europe, and September 3, 2015, in Japan for the Nintendo 3DS and PlayStation Vita. The game is the sequel to Lego Ninjago: Nindroids which was released in 2014. It was released for iOS and Android in late 2015–early 2016.

== Gameplay ==
The story starts off with Ronin stealing the ninjas' memories. The ninjas have to smash, build and explore their way to stop Ronin's evil plans. The Dark Samurai serve as the evil clique of the game.

The player controls one of the main characters from a third-person perspective, usually fighting enemies, and collecting Lego studs. There are a total of 68 playable characters in the game (excluding multiple variants/outfits of all characters).

The game features locales from the TV series, including the Ice Temple, the Toxic Bogs, and a mysterious new island. Players will also visit the mountain village of Spinjago, where the Ninjas are currently training under 'Grand Sensei' Dareth and Sensei Wu.

The game is divided into levels, which are typically completed by defeating all of the enemies in the area. Players can use a variety of attacks and combos to defeat their enemies, and they can also use the environment to their advantage. For example, players can throw objects at enemies or knock them into traps.

In addition to combat, players will also need to solve puzzles in order to progress through the game. These puzzles can range from simple to complex, and they often require players to use the special abilities of different characters. For example, Lloyd can phase through walls, while Zane can freeze enemies.

== Reception ==
Reception

Aggregate score
Aggregator	Score		
Aggregator	3DS	iOS	PS Vita
Metacritic	60/100	60/100	70/100

Review scores
Publication	Score		
Publication	3DS	iOS	PS Vita
Nintendo Life	4/10	N/A	N/A
Pocket Gamer	N/A	3/5	N/A

Lego Ninjago: Shadow of Ronin received "mixed or average" reviews, according to review aggregator Metacritic.

Ron DelVillano for Nintendo Life rated the game 4/10, stating that the gameplay is "inexcusably stale".

Common Sense Media on the other hand, rated it a 4/5, stating that "Lego Ninjago: Shadow of Ronin takes everything that kids love about the cartoon and packs it nicely into a handheld game."

Chris James for Pocket Gamer states that the game's controls were "a frustrating, fumbling mess" and Lego Ninjago: Shadow of Ronin is categorically not for everyone and will appeal to youngsters most of all."

== See also ==
- Lego Ninjago (video game franchise)
