= Ninjago: Legacy of the Green Ninja =

Danish animated television season

- Season 2
- Legacy of the Green Ninja poster
- Starring: Jillian Michaels; Vincent Tong; Michael Adamthwaite; Brent Miller; Kirby Morrow; Kelly Metzger; Paul Dobson; Mark Oliver; Kathleen Barr; Scott McNeil
- No. of episodes: 13

Release
- Original network: Cartoon Network
- Original release: July 18 – November 21, 2012

Season chronology
- ← Previous; Rise of the Snakes Next → Rebooted

Legacy of the Green Ninja is the second season of the animated television series Ninjago: Masters of Spinjitzu (titled Ninjago from the eleventh season onward). The series was created by Michael Hegner and Tommy Andreasen. The season aired from July 18 to November 21, 2012, following the first season titled Rise of the Snakes. It is succeeded by the third season, titled Rebooted.

The second season was originally intended as the final season of the series. The show and its associated Lego Ninjago product line had been planned as a three-year project. However, due to the strong performance of the television series and the product line combined with positive feedback from online forums, the series was continued past the end of 2013.

Legacy of the Green Ninja follows the storyline of the Ninja Team training their new member Lloyd Garmadon in order to prepare for a prophesied final battle. Lord Garmadon returns as the season's main antagonist whose devious plans result in Lloyd being magically aged up to a teenager. The season also introduces Lloyd's long-lost mother Misako for the first time. It also reveals the Overlord as the season's overarching antagonist and culminates in the Final Battle between Lloyd and the Overlord.

== Voice cast ==
=== Main ===
- Jillian Michaels as Lloyd Garmadon, the Green/Golden Ninja and Elemental Master of Energy
- Vincent Tong as Kai, the Red Ninja and Elemental Master of Fire
- Michael Adamthwaite as Jay, the Blue Ninja and Elemental Master of Lightning
- Brent Miller as Zane, the White Ninja and Elemental Master of Ice
- Kirby Morrow as Cole, the Black Ninja and Elemental Master of Earth
- Kelly Metzger as Nya, Kai's sister
- Paul Dobson as Sensei Wu, the wise teacher of the ninja
- Mark Oliver as Lord Garmadon
- Kathleen Barr as Misako
- Scott McNeil as the Overlord/Dragon Overlord

=== Supporting ===
- Alan Marriott as Captain Soto
- Alan Marriott as Dareth/General Kozu
- Colin Murdock as Ed
- Jillian Michaels as Edna
- Kirby Morrow as Lou
- Mark Oliver as Dr. Julien
- Ian James Corlett as Skales
- Brian Drummond as Nuckal/Kruncha
- Michael Kopsa as Samukai
- Kelly Sheridan as Gayle Gossip
- Mackenzie Gray as Fangpyre General/Museum Curator/Mystake
- John Novak as Constrictai General
- Paul Dobson as Venomari General/Mother Doomsday/Garmatron
- Cathy Weseluck as Patty Keys
- Kathleen Barr as Brad

== Production ==
=== Direction ===
The Legacy of the Green Ninja episodes were directed by Michael Helmuth Hansen, Trylle Vilstrup, Martin Skov, Thomas Østergaard Poulsen and Peter Hausner.

=== Animation ===
The animation for the second season was produced at Wil Film ApS in Denmark.

== Release ==
The first episode of the season titled Darkness Shall Rise was released on July 18, 2012 on Cartoon Network. The subsequent episodes were released in July, August, October and November 2012. The season finale titled Rise of the Spinjitzu Master was released on November 21, 2012.

== Synopsis ==
After Lord Garmadon destroyed the Great Devourer, the Ninja begun to train Lloyd the chosen Green Ninja to be ready for the final battle against his own father. Garmadon tried to sabotage Lloyd using the Mega Weapon from being more powerful to finally win. As he arrived to the Dark Island, a half of Ninjago, Garmadon teams up with the Overlord; Who had fought against the First Spinjitzu Master once. The Ninja made the now teenaged Lloyd ready to fight against his father and the Overlord, the final battle against good and evil.

== Episodes ==
No. overall	No. in season	Title	Directed by	Written by	Original release date	U.S. viewers (millions)
14	1	"Darkness Shall Rise"	Michael Helmuth Hansen	The Hageman Brothers	July 18, 2012	2.85
Without the Golden Weapons, the Ninja have lost their elemental powers. They decide to get jobs to rent an apartment but working overtime to afford the rent leaves them with no time to train Lloyd. Meanwhile, Lord Garmadon rebuilds the Destiny's Bounty, and persuades the Serpentine to follow him. The Serpentine Generals refuse to join and plot to kidnap Lloyd instead. They distract the Ninjas who are busy with their work, while Skales sneaks into the Ninjas' apartment, but he is captured and arrested. Lord Garmadon and the Serpentine fly to the Golden Peaks and he fuses the Golden Weapons together into a Mega Weapon.
15	2	"Pirates vs. Ninjas"	Trylle Vilstrup	The Hageman Brothers	July 25, 2012	2.30
After settling for a smaller apartment, the Ninja go to "Grand Sensei Dareth's Mojo Dojo" and ask Dareth to let them use it to train Lloyd. Lord Garmadon discovers Captain Soto's journal in the Bounty's cabin and accidentally resurrects the ship's original pirate-crew, realizing that the Mega Weapon only has the power to create. The pirates lock up Garmadon and the Serpentine and attack Ninjago City. Dareth, dressed as the Brown Ninja, jumps on board and is captured. The Ninja go to rescue him and Lloyd does Spinjitzu and elemental power of energy for the first time. The pirates are defeated and arrested, but Lord Garmadon escapes and takes back the Bounty.
16	3	"Double Trouble"	Martin Skov	The Hageman Brothers & Joel Thomas	August 1, 2012	2.08
The Ninja receive an invitation for an awarding ceremony from Lloyd's old school, Darkley Boarding School, but it turns out to be a trap: the students lock them up along with the teachers and take Lloyd. Evil replicas of the Ninjas created by Lord Garmadon's Mega Weapon learn of the Ninjas' location from Nya and go after them. At the school, the Ninjas escape only to come face to face with the Evil Ninjas. Lloyd persuades his former classmates to admit to their inner goodness and, together, they discover a way for the Ninjas to defeat their evil counterparts.
17	4	"Ninjaball Run"	Thomas Østergaard Poulsen	The Hageman Brothers & Joel Thomas	August 8, 2012	2.38
Dareth has fallen behind on his payments and a company named Darnagom (an anagram of Garmadon) intends to buy the land the Dojo is built on. The Ninjas enter the Ninjaball Run, the most dangerous race in Ninjago, hoping to cover Dareth's debts with the prize money. Garmadon also enters the race with the Bounty to prevent them from winning, but the Ninja manage to cross the finish line first in a close race and Lloyd takes the Bounty back from Garmadon.
18	5	"Child's Play"	Michael Helmuth Hansen	The Hageman Brothers	August 15, 2012	2.79
Lord Garmadon breaks into the museum to revive the extinct Grundle using the Mega Weapon. The Ninjas interrupt him but are also affected. Reverted to children, the Ninjas are powerless against the resurrected Grundle. Just as the Ninjas are about to be eaten, Master Wu and Nya arrive with some Tomorrow's Tea, that could age them back. Lloyd uses the tea to defeat the Grundle and return the Ninja to normal, but Lloyd is aged up in the process.
19	6	"Wrong Place, Wrong Time"	Trylle Vilstrup	The Hageman Brothers	August 22, 2012	2.31
Lord Garmadon uses his Mega Weapon to create a time portal, hoping to prevent the formation of the Ninja team and meeting Lloyd. The Ninja follow him as he goes back in time to the day Kai met Sensei Wu. After failing to alter the timeline by stopping Nya's kidnapping, Garmadon teams up with his past self and ambushes the past Kai in the Fire Temple. The present Ninja arrive and fight back and destroy the Mega Weapon using the past Golden Weapons. The destruction of the Mega Weapon restores the timeline to normal.
20	7	"The Stone Army"	Martin Skov	The Hageman Brothers	October 3, 2012	2.17
The Ninja meet Misako, Lloyd's long-lost mother, who tells them of the Overlord and his indestructible Stone Army. The venom of the Great Devourer brings a huge Stone Warrior to life, but the Ninja trick him into toppling down a bottomless pit. Meanwhile, a now powerless Garmadon returns to the City of Ouroboros to plan his next move to the Dark Island, but the Serpentine betrays him and toss him into the sea. He washes up on the shores of the Dark Island, where he meets the Overlord for first time and the two join forces.
21	8	"The Day Ninjago Stood Still"	Peter Hausner	The Hageman Brothers & Joel Thomas	October 10, 2012	1.98
Having been crowned the new Snake King, Skales plans to undermine the foundations of Ninjago City, bringing it down into chaos. Underneath the city the Serpentine uncover an ancient vault, where the Stone Army rests. The Great Devourer's venom melts through the ceiling, animating the statues, who defeat the Serpentine and trap them inside for good. On the Dark Island, Garmadon is guided by the Overlord to the Celestial Clock, where he dons the Helmet of Shadows, starting the clock's countdown to the Final Battle.
22	9	"The Last Voyage"	Michael Helmuth Hansen	The Hageman Brothers & Joel Thomas	October 17, 2012	1.84
On the Dark Island, the Overlord and his Stone Army begin the construction of a Super-Weapon, that would harness the island's Dark Matter. The Ninja set sail for the Dark Island on the Bounty, in a quest to find the Temple of Light, where they can obtain the power to defeat the Stone Army. The ship is caught in a storm and eventually runs aground on an uncharted island with a lighthouse. In the Lighthouse, they discover Zane's father and creator, Dr. Julien who was brought back to life by Samukai and forced to build war machines for the Skulkin. He repairs the Bounty, allowing them to continue their journey to the Dark Island.
23	10	"Island of Darkness"	Trylle Vilstrup	The Hageman Brothers	October 24, 2012	1.74
The Ninja finally arrive on the Dark Island and begin their search for the Temple of Light, while Dr. Julien and Nya build them new vehicles. They eventually locate the Temple and are given Elemental Swords, that restore their elemental powers and Lloyd obtains the great power of the First Spinjitzu Master.
24	11	"The Last Hope"	Martin Skov	The Hageman Brothers & Joel Thomas	November 7, 2012	1.87
Misako speculates that returning the Helmet of Shadows to its pedestal could stop the countdown and prevent the Final Battle. Dressed as Stone Warriors, the Ninjas escort her to Garmadon's camp, where she manages to steal the helmet. The Ninja reach the Celestial Clock but are one second too late to stop the countdown. The Celestial Clock powers-up the Overlord's completed Super-Weapon, the "Garmatron", and Nya is captured by the Stone Army.
25	12	"Return of the Overlord"	Peter Hausner	The Hageman Brothers	November 14, 2012	1.82
On the coast of the Dark Island, the Stone Army deploys the Garmatron to corrupt Ninjago's inhabitants with Dark Matter, upseting the balance between good and evil. Nya, also corrupted, attempts to stop the Ninja from following, but is subdued. The Overlord betrays Garmadon, possessing him and attacking Lloyd, who tries and fails to bring his father to his senses. The Overlord defeats Lloyd, breaking his leg and wrecking the Bounty, before opening a portal to Ninjago City and leading the Stone Army through it. The Ninja are left stranded with no hope on the Dark Island.
26	13	"Rise of the Spinjitzu Master"	Michael Helmuth Hansen	The Hageman Brothers	November 21, 2012	3.11
The Ninja return to the Temple of Light where they find the First Spinjitzu Master's golden battle mech. With the help of the golden mech and the Ultra-Dragon, the group flies back to Ninjago City. The Overlord, now morphed into a Dragon Overlord, has conquered all Ninjago completely. The Ninja are outnumbered by the Stone Army, but Dareth saves them by recovering the discarded Helmet of Shadows and forcing the Stone Warriors to stand down. The Ninja climb the Overlord's tower, with only Lloyd reaching the top. Lloyd unlocks his True Potential and becomes the Golden Ninja, obtaining the ultimate power of the First Spinjitzu Master and summoning the power of golden dragon. He begins to fight the Dragon Overlord and after Lloyd unleashes an gigantic explosion of light, he defeats Dragon Overlord and all Ninjago is freed from the control, and also freeing his father from Overlord's possession and vanishing the evil inside him to return to human form.

== Ratings ==
The Season 2 premiere was listed as the top telecast of the day with children aged 2–11 and all boys on Wednesday 18 July 2012 and secured more than 2.8 million total viewers aged 2+. It was the top telecast in its Wednesday, 8 p.m. time period with children aged 6–11 and 9-14 and all boys. The series led Cartoon Network to the number one television network position on Wednesday nights with children aged 2–11 and all boys. The season premiere increased average ratings by double and triple digits compared to its original Season 1 premiere for the same time period (ranging between 124% and 184%), the previous four weeks (between 114% and 154%) and all competitive programming including Disney Channel and Nickelodeon in the same time period (between 14% and 506%) The total number of viewers aged 2+ increased by 30%.

== Other media ==
Alongside the season, Lego also released a side-scrolling action-adventure game titled Lego Ninjago: The Final Battle that released on March 18, 2013.

== See also ==
- List of Ninjago characters
- Lego Ninjago (video game franchise)
