= Lego Battles: Ninjago =

2011 video game

- North American cover art
- Developer: Hellbent Games
- Publishers: Warner Bros. Interactive Entertainment; TT Games Publishing
- Series: Lego Ninjago
- Platform: Nintendo DS
- Release: NA: 12 April 2011; EU: 15 April 2011; AU: 20 April 2011
- Genre: Real-time strategy
- Modes: Single-player, multiplayer

Lego Battles: Ninjago (also known as Lego Ninjago: The Videogame in Europe and Australia) is a real-time strategy game developed by Hellbent Games and published by Warner Bros. Interactive Entertainment. It was released on 12 April 2011 in North America, 15 April 2011 in Europe, and 20 April 2011 in Australia for the Nintendo DS. It is a follow-up to Lego Battles. Unlike the previous game, Lego Battles: Ninjago is loosely based on the pilot season of the Ninjago: Masters of Spinjitzu animated television series.

== Gameplay ==
In Lego Battles: Ninjago, players control six builders and seven heroes. Each hero has three versions, two of which must be researched. Two special abilities ("spells") can be used in these modes. Teams can also build five different buildings: the keep, the headquarters of the team; the brick bank, where builders can drop off bricks; the mine, which automatically produces bricks; the barracks, which produces heroes; and the tower, which fires projectiles. In addition, towers can have upgrades based on elements. The Ninjago story is based on ninja training and their quest to find the four golden weapons in the underworld. The skeleton story is based on the skeleton army (led by Samukai) searching for golden weapons.

The story is based on the Ninjago: Masters of Spinjitzu pilot episode (but with some minor differences). Some characters in the game are from different Lego themes; Agents, Mars Mission, etc.

== Reception ==
Reception

Aggregate score
| Aggregator | Score |
|---|---|
| Metacritic | 59/100 |

Review scores
| Publication | Score |
|---|---|
| GamesRadar+ | 2.5/5 |
| Nintendo Life | 5/10 |
| Nintendo World Report | 5/10 |

Lego Battles: Ninjago received "mixed or average" reviews, according to review aggregator Metacritic.

GamesRadar+'s Jason Kramer said "The real-time strategy component is great for beginners, but may come off as a bore for seasoned players and anyone who prefers fast-paced action over strategic planning."

Andrew Brown at Nintendo World Report stated that "While the game can be quite enjoyable with patience and perseverance, the story premise is overdone and ridiculous, and Lego fans would be better off to play with the actual toy bricks."

== See also ==
- Lego Ninjago (video game franchise)
