= Lego Legacy: Heroes Unboxed =

2020 video game

- Developer: Gameloft
- Publishers: Gameloft; Netflix
- Platforms: Android; Facebook Gaming; iOS
- Release: 27 February 2020
- Genre: Turn-based strategy
- Mode: Single-player

Lego Legacy: Heroes Unboxed was a Lego-themed turn-based strategy game developed and published by Gameloft. It was released on Apple's App Store and Google Play as a free downloadable game. The game centers on a fictional location named Piptown, which serves as the central game hub for accessing the challenges, campaigns, events, shop, guilds, and arena.

It was designed for players of all ages and aimed to bring to life 40 years of minifigure history, while also featuring classic Lego sets from the past. Although it was free to play, there are some shortcuts that can be made with in-game purchases.

== Gameplay ==
Lego Legacy: Heroes Unboxed was a turn-based strategic battle role-playing game, which incorporates characters from the Lego range of collectible minifigures. The characters are described as Piptown residents. The game allows the player to create a team of five minifigure characters, which are used to battle in campaigns, events and against other players in the arena.

Players progress through the game by travelling through maps and completing battles against other teams of non-player characters. Minifigure characters can be unlocked along the way, by looting campaigns and finding character tiles. Characters can also be levelled up and improved by unlocking new abilities and gear. Several characters can only be unlocked during special events or by purchasing tiles from the game shop.

Each minifigure has its own unique set of abilities and is designed to perform as part of a team. Players therefore have the ability to customise their team using a choice of minifigure characters to optimise their battle performance.

The game also involves unlocking and building Lego sets, which can enhance the abilities of certain characters. The sets were designed to be accurate representations of classic Lego sets. Each set includes the original box art and can be built digitally by the player to recreate the construction of the real-life set. Like the minifigure characters, the sets are unlocked by looting and finding tiles and can be levelled up to unlock abilities, with some sets only becoming available during special events.

The arena offers players the opportunity to battle against other players, in order to test their team's performance and rise up the ranks of the leaderboard.

== Minifigures ==
The collection of playable minifigure characters is based on recognisable Lego minifigures that have been released throughout Lego history either as part of Lego construction sets, as collectible minifigures or as part of one of the Lego themes. Minifigures are grouped into different types and include classic space, pirates, town and city, castle, collectibles, Ninjago and Ghostbusters.

== Development and release ==
In order to recreate the Lego minifigures and sets in digital form with great accuracy, Gameloft Toronto spent time studying the full range of Lego minifigures with the Lego archive team in Billund, Denmark. The range of minifigures involved in the study included every minifigure released, from the first minifigure created in 1978. The purpose was to reintroduce the nostalgia of Lego minifigures and sets that players may have experienced in their youth, whilst also celebrating the multiple generations of minifigures of past and present.

The game was developed and released by Gameloft on 27 February 2020.

The game server was closed on 28 February 2023. Players could continue playing by transferring to Facebook Cloud Gaming, where the game was maintained until the end of 2023.

In June 2023, Netflix announced players can continue playing Lego Legacy: Heroes Unboxed in the Netflix Gaming app will be coming soon and for Netflix subscribers only. On 14 July 2025, 2 years after the Netflix relaunch of the game, Netflix took the game back offline.

== Reception ==
Reception

Review scores
Publication	Score
Common Sense Media	4/5
Multiplayer.it	70/100

David Chapman for Common Sense Media gave the game a four out of five-star rating and commented, "While Lego Legacy: Heroes Unboxed is a solid strategy game on its own, its real appeal is how the game never takes itself seriously. There's just something fun about watching a guy in [a] hot dog suit build an exploding Lego microwave to kick over to the opposing team. It's that tongue-in-cheek humor more so than anything else that'll keep players coming back. Which is a good thing for sure, because the game can start to get a bit repetitive after a while."
