= Lego Ninjago: Nindroids =

2014 Lego video game

- Developer: Hellbent Games
- Publishers: TT Games; Warner Bros. Interactive Entertainment
- Director: Christopher Mair
- Programmer: Stephen Spanner
- Artist: David Reddick
- Series: Lego Ninjago
- Platforms: PlayStation Vita; Nintendo 3DS
- Release: NA: July 29, 2014; AU: July 30, 2014; EU: August 1, 2014
- Genre: Action-adventure
- Mode: Single-player

Lego Ninjago: Nindroids is a Lego-themed action-adventure handheld video game developed by Hellbent Games and published by TT Games and Warner Bros. Interactive Entertainment. It was released on July 29, 2014 in North America and on August 1, 2014 in Europe for the Nintendo 3DS and PlayStation Vita. The game is based on the first five episodes of the third season of the Ninjago TV series.

== Gameplay ==
The game's main weapon is the Technoblades, which was showcased in the show. The game takes place in New Ninjago City where the player fights enemies throughout the city in different outfits in each level. The bosses include Techno Wu, the Nindroids, and the final boss is the Overlord.

== Development ==
The game was developed by Hellbent Games and published by TT Games and Warner Bros. Interactive Entertainment. The game was developed exclusively as a portable entry, so the cinematics were not simply ripped and compressed from a higher definition home console version, resulting in improved visuals during the story elements.

== Reception ==
Reception

Aggregate score
Aggregator	Score	
Aggregator	3DS	PS Vita
Metacritic	41/100	58/100

Review scores
Publication	Score	
Publication	3DS	PS Vita
Nintendo Life	6/10 stars	N/A
Push Square	N/A	7/10 stars
The Digital Fix	N/A	6/10
Digitally Downloaded	N/A	3/5 stars
Gamereactor	N/A	3/5
Nintendojo	D+	N/A

Lego Ninjago: Nindroids received "mixed or average" reviews, according to review aggregator Metacritic.

Nintendo Life rated the game 6 out of 10 stars, stating "LEGO Ninjago: Nindroids feels like just another addition to the ever-expanding brick-based universe." Gamereactor rated the game 3/5, stating that it lacks "entertainment value while there are some positive bits."

Ron DelVillano for Push Square rated the game 7 out of 10 stars, stating that "Fans of the Ninjago construction sets and television series are sure to love being able to take control of their favorite heroes, but anyone simply looking for a new action adventure to play through may not be overly enchanted with this one."

Lewis Brown for The Digital Fix rated the game 6/10, stating that "Throw in other common Lego issues, such as an extremely boring hub side-game based on combat and you have to count Lego Ninjago: Nindroids very much as a missed opportunity."

Brad L. for Digitally Downloaded stated that "With its short but sweet levels, it makes sense for handheld gaming too, just don't expect anything ground-breaking from this LEGO game." Nintendojo rated the game D+, stating that "LEGO Ninjago: Nindroids isn't the worst LEGO game ever made, but it certainly could have used a lot of improvements to make the experience more enjoyable."

== See also ==
- Lego Ninjago (video game franchise)
