= The Lego Ninjago Movie =

2017 animated film

- Theatrical release poster
- Directed by: Charlie Bean; Paul Fisher; Bob Logan
- Screenplay by: Bob Logan; Paul Fisher; William Wheeler; Tom Wheeler; Jared Stern; John Whittington
- Story by: Hilary Winston; Bob Logan; Paul Fisher; William Wheeler; Tom Wheeler; Dan Hageman Kevin Hageman
- Based on: Lego Ninjago
- Produced by: Dan Lin; Phil Lord; Christopher Miller; Chris McKay; Maryann Garger; Roy Lee
- Starring: Dave Franco; Michael Peña; Kumail Nanjiani; Abbi Jacobson; Zach Woods; Fred Armisen; Jackie Chan; Justin Theroux; Olivia Munn
- Cinematography: Simon Duggan (live-action sequences)
- Edited by: Julie Rogers; Garret Elkins; Ryan Folsey; John Venzon; David Burrows
- Music by: Mark Mothersbaugh
- Production companies: Warner Animation Group; RatPac Entertainment; Lego System A/S; Lin Pictures; Lord Miller Productions; Vertigo Entertainment; Animal Logic
- Distributed by: Warner Bros. Pictures
- Release dates: 16 September 2017 (Regency Village Theater); 21 September 2017 (Denmark); 22 September 2017 (United States)
- Running time: 101 minutes
- Countries: Denmark; United States; Australia
- Language: English
- Budget: $70 million
- Box office: $123.8 million

The Lego Ninjago Movie is a 2017 animated martial arts comedy film, based on the toy/kit line of the same name and the TV show starring the same characters. Directed by Charlie Bean, Paul Fisher, and Bob Logan (in their feature directorial debuts) from a screenplay by Logan, Fisher, William Wheeler, Tom Wheeler, Jared Stern, and John Whittington, it is the first theatrical film to be based on an original Lego property and the third installment in The Lego Movie franchise as well as its second spin-off. The film stars the voices of Dave Franco, Michael Peña, Kumail Nanjiani, Abbi Jacobson, Zach Woods, Fred Armisen, Justin Theroux and Olivia Munn and as well as a live-action role by Jackie Chan (who also voiced Wu in the film). The film focuses on a teenage ninja Lloyd Garmadon, as he attempts to accept the truth about his sinister father and learn what it truly means to be a ninja warrior as a new threat emerges to endanger his homeland.

An animated feature film based on Ninjago was announced in September 2013 by Warner Bros., with The Hageman Brothers writing the adaptation while Bean was hired to direct the film with Phil Lord and Christopher Miller, Dan Lin and Roy Lee producing. By May 2014, following the success of The Lego Movie, Warner Bros. announced that the film would be originally released in September 2016, which later changed to September 2017 in April 2015. The cast were signed in to voice the characters in 2016, from June to August. As with The Lego Movie and The Lego Batman Movie, the animation was provided by Animal Logic. Mark Mothersbaugh, who composed The Lego Movie, composed the film's musical score, with several artists performing new original songs for the film.

A collaboration between production houses from the United States and Denmark, The Lego Ninjago Movie was released by Warner Bros. Pictures in the United States on 22 September 2017. The film received mixed reviews from critics and was the franchise's first box-office disappointment, grossing only $123.8 million worldwide against its $70 million budget. A live-action reboot from Universal Pictures is in development.

== Plot ==
While avoiding some bullies, a young boy walks into a relic shop, where he meets the mysterious owner, Mr. Liu, who tells him the story of Ninjago, a city within the LEGO universe. It is frequently terrorized by the evil warlord, Lord Garmadon, and his army of sea life-themed henchmen. Garmadon's constant attacks on the city resulted in his son, Lloyd, being despised by nearly everyone in Ninjago City for his relation to Garmadon, putting him under emotional stress. Unbeknownst to everyone, Lloyd is the Green Ninja, the leader of a ninja team comprising Kai, Cole, Jay, Zane, Nya, and their master Wu (Garmadon's brother and Lloyd's uncle), who always stop Garmadon from taking over Ninjago by fighting with mechs. When Garmadon is once again unsuccessful at conquering Ninjago, his tech division shows him a giant new mech.

Following their victory, Wu tells the ninja that only their "unique element" will permanently vanquish Garmadon. Lloyd is frustrated to learn his element is "green" while Kai has fire, Cole has earth, Jay has lightning, Zane has ice, and Nya has water. Wu also mentions the "Ultimate Weapon", giving Lloyd new hope of stopping Garmadon, despite Wu warning them that nobody can ever use the device. That next day, Garmadon attacks Ninjago with his new mech and this time defeats Lloyd. As Garmadon gloats, Lloyd returns with the Ultimate Weapon and fires it, only to discover it is actually a laser pointer that attracts a live-action cat, Meowthra. Garmadon points the laser at the ninja's mechs, which the cat destroys, but Lloyd breaks it. As Garmadon celebrates his victory, Lloyd unmasks himself and denounces his father, leaving Garmadon confused.

Lloyd meets up with his friends and Wu, who tells them they must use the "Ultimate, Ultimate Weapon" to stop Meowthra from destroying Ninjago, which can be found on the other side of the island. Garmadon overhears the conversation, follows close behind, and intercepts the ninja. Wu and Garmadon fight, and although the former manages to trap the latter in a cage, he falls off a bridge into the river below. Before being swept away, Wu tells the ninja they must find "inner peace". The ninja continues with Garmadon leading them, much to Lloyd's annoyance. Despite this, the two bond throughout their journey, while the ninja learn not to rely solely on their mechs to fight. The group survives an encounter with Garmadon's fired generals, and Garmadon teaches Lloyd to throw.

They eventually crash down onto the Temple of Fragile Foundations, Garmadon and Wu's childhood home. He tells Lloyd that his mother, Koko, was once a warrior named "Lady Iron Dragon" and that he wishes he had stayed with them after deciding to conquer Ninjago, but couldn't change his ways, which is why they had to stay apart. The ninja finds the Ultimate, Ultimate Weapon, a chest consisting of a set of LEGO pieces that resemble their elemental powers, only to have it stolen by Garmadon, who remains resolute in taking over the city after Lloyd refuses his offer to replace a mutinous general. In an unexpected turnaround, Garmadon locks the ninja inside the temple as it begins to collapse. Lloyd realizes that "inner peace" means they must unleash their elemental power and escape from the collapsing temple. As they fall off a cliff, Wu saves them with the ninja's flying ship, the Destiny's Bounty, and they head back to Ninjago City.

Garmadon tries to defeat Meowthra with the Ultimate, Ultimate Weapon, only to end up eaten. Lloyd and the others arrive and begin fighting Garmadon's army. As Lloyd approaches Meowthra, he reveals to everyone that he is the Green Ninja and realizes that "green" means life and that his element is what connects the ninja and his family. He comforts and tames Meowthra and apologizes to Garmadon profusely, saying that he forgives him. Realizing the error of his ways, Garmadon cries tears of fire, causing Meowthra to regurgitate him back out. After Lloyd and Garmadon reconcile, Meowthra becomes the mascot of Ninjago and Lloyd is hailed as a hero.

As Mr. Liu finishes his story about Ninjago, he informs the boy that he has the potential to be a great ninja warrior and tells him that they will start training at dawn.

== Cast ==
- Dave Franco as Lloyd Garmadon / Green Ninja, the leader of the Secret Ninja Force, Lord Garmadon and Koko's son, and Master Wu's nephew.
- Michael Peña as Kai / Fire Ninja, a hotheaded, energetic part of the Secret Ninja Force, and Nya's brother.
- Kumail Nanjiani as Jay / Lightning Ninja, a quiet and cautious part of the Secret Ninja Force.
- Abbi Jacobson as Nya / Water Ninja, a strong part of the Secret Ninja Force, Kai's sister, and Jay's crush.
- Zach Woods as Zane / Ice Ninja, a robotic part of the Secret Ninja Force.
- Fred Armisen as Cole / Earth Ninja, a laid-back music-loving part of the Secret Ninja Force.
- Jackie Chan as Master Wu, the Secret Ninja Force's wisecracking kung-fu master, Lord Garmadon's brother, and Lloyd's uncle.
  - Chan also plays Mr. Liu, an elderly shopkeeper who appears in the live-action part of the film.
- Justin Theroux as Lord Garmadon, the Lord of Evil, Master Wu's brother, Koko's ex-husband, and Lloyd's father.
- Olivia Munn as Koko, Lord Garmadon's ex-wife, and Lloyd's mother. She was formerly known as the legendary "Lady Iron Dragon" when she worked as a warrior-queen.
- Randall Park and Retta as Chad and Maggie, the cheerleaders at Ninjago High School who bully Lloyd.
- Constance Wu as the Mayor of Ninjago.
- Lo Mutuc (Note: Credited as Charlyne Yi) and Vanara Taing as Terri and Asimov, the IT Nerds working for Lord Garmadon.
- Chris Hardwick as a radio DJ working in Ninjago City.
- Robin Roberts as herself, a Lego caricature of the newscaster. In the UK version, she is replaced by Kate Garraway.
- Michael Strahan as himself, a Lego caricature of the known media personality and former New York Giants defensive end. In the UK version, he is replaced by Ben Shephard.
- David Burrows as a fuchsia ninja who has the "element of surprise."
- Alex Kauffman as Ninja Computer.
- Ali Wong as General Olivia, the fish-themed general of Garmadon's Shark Army.
- Todd Hansen as General Omar, the shark-themed general of Garmadon's Shark Army.
- Doug Nicholas as General Jollty, the jellyfish-themed general of Garmadon's Shark Army.
- Bobby Lee as the owner of a pilates studio in Ninjago City.
- Laura Kightlinger as Mrs. Laudita, a teacher at Ninjago High School.
- Pearl and Ruby as Meowthra, a live-action cat that terrorizes Ninjago.
- Kaan Guldur as a young boy who appears at the live-action part of the film, where he is told the story of Ninjago by Mr. Liu.

== Production ==
On 17 September 2013, Warner Bros. announced that it was developing an animated Ninjago film based on the Lego toy line Lego Ninjago. The Hageman Brothers, who wrote the Ninjago: Masters of Spinjitzu show and co-wrote the story of The Lego Movie, would write the adaptation. Charlie Bean was announced as director, and The Lego Movie team of Dan Lin, Roy Lee, and Phil Lord and Chris Miller as producers. On 27 June 2016, the film's voice cast was announced, including Dave Franco, Michael Peña, Kumail Nanjiani, Zach Woods, Fred Armisen, Jackie Chan, and Abbi Jacobson. Additional voice cast included Justin Theroux as Lord Garmadon and Olivia Munn as Koko.

=== Filming ===
In order to give the film a more believable father-son atmosphere, Dave Franco and Justin Theroux recorded most of their lines where their characters interact with each other together in a single recording studio. During the process, Franco openly admitted he found himself uncontrollably crying while recording some of his lines. Franco stated "I found myself getting caught up in the moment and basically crying harder than I have in any live-action movie I've ever been in".

Jackie Chan choreographed all of Master Wu's fight scenes in live action before they were recreated in animation for the film. Chan found the experience new to him as well as interesting. "Everything the stunt team does, the ninja do also", Chan commented.

== Music ==
Mark Mothersbaugh, who composed the score for The Lego Movie, returned to score The Lego Ninjago Movie. The soundtrack was released through WaterTower Music on 15 September 2017.

== Release ==
The Lego Ninjago Movie premiered at the Regency Village Theater on 16 September 2017, before it was widely released in the United States by Warner Bros. Pictures on 22 September, in 3D, RealD 3D, and Dolby Cinema. It was originally scheduled for a 23 September 2016 release. This release date was given to Storks instead. The film was released in Denmark on 21 September 2017. It was released in the Philippines on 27 September 2017.

A short film, The Master, that promoted the feature film was shown with screenings of Storks, which took the original 23 September release date. On 8 February 2017, the first trailer was released. This trailer was shown in front of screenings of The Lego Batman Movie. On 22 July 2017, a second trailer for the film was shown as part of San Diego Comic-Con and released on YouTube later in the day. Both trailers feature the song "Bad Blood" by Taylor Swift, with the second trailer also featuring "It Must Have Been Love" by Roxette, "Ain't Gonna Die Tonight" by Macklemore and "I Wanna Go Out" by American Authors.

=== Marketing ===
Over twenty Lego sets inspired by scenes from the film were released for the film including a set of Collectible Minifigures. A video game by TT Fusion based on the film, The Lego Ninjago Movie Video Game, was released on 22 September 2017, for Windows PC, Nintendo Switch, PlayStation 4 and Xbox One. The game is similar to previous Lego games, with some new features such as multiplayer battle modes and new combo based combat techniques.

=== Home media ===
The Lego Ninjago Movie was released on Digital HD on 12 December 2017, and DVD, Blu-ray, Blu-ray 3D, and 4K Blu-ray on 19 December 2017, by Warner Bros. Home Entertainment.

=== Video game ===
Based on The Lego Ninjago Movie, it was released for Microsoft Windows, Nintendo Switch, PlayStation 4, and Xbox One, alongside the film, in North America on 22 September 2017, and worldwide on 20 October 2017. It serves as the second spin-off video game and the third game in The Lego Movie franchise.

== Reception ==
=== Box office ===
The Lego Ninjago Movie grossed $59.4 million in the United States and Canada, and $64.4 million in other territories, for a worldwide total of $123.8 million against a $70 million budget.

In North America, the film was released alongside Kingsman: The Golden Circle and Friend Request. Various tracking services had the film projected to gross anywhere from $27–44 million from 4,047 theaters in its opening weekend. After making $5.8 million on its first day, weekend projections were lowered to $21 million. It ended up debuting to $21.2 million, finishing third at the box office below It and Kingsman: The Golden Circle, and ranking as the lowest opening of the Lego franchise by over 50%.

=== Critical response ===
On review aggregation website Rotten Tomatoes, the film holds an approval rating of 56% based on 132 reviews, with an average rating of 5.8/10. The site's critical consensus reads, "Despite ample charm and a few solid gags, The Lego Ninjago Movie suggests this franchise's formula isn't clicking like it used to." On Metacritic, the film has a weighted average score of 55 out of 100 based on 33 critics, indicating "mixed or average reviews". Audiences polled by CinemaScore gave the film an average grade of "B+" on an A+ to F scale.

Andrew Barker of Variety wrote: "Plenty entertaining and occasionally very funny, Ninjago nonetheless displays symptoms of diminishing returns, and Lego might want to shuffle its pieces a bit before building yet another film with this same model." Ed Potton of The Times gave the film a rating of 4 out of 5, saying, "Just as Toy Story did by featuring an owner of the toys, it reminds us that these films are about play and imagination. Yes, they're also effectively feature-length adverts for Lego, but this is rampant capitalism at its most arch and entertaining." Robbie Collin of Daily Telegraph gave it a 2 out of 5 rating, describing it as "a sad turn-up for a franchise which has already proven dazzlingly adept at staging Michael Bay-style madcap spectacle on a toy-box scale." Peter Travers of Rolling Stone gave the film a 2 out of 4 scoring, saying, "Despite comically inspired vocal performances from Justin Theroux and Dave Franco as nutjob Lego versions of Darth Vader and Luke Skywalker, the action and jokes pile up with exhausting repetitiveness."

=== Accolades ===
Award / Film Festival	Category	Recipient(s)	Result
16th Visual Effects Society Awards	Outstanding Visual Effects in an Animated Feature	Gregory Jowle, Fiona Childton, Miles Green, Kim Taylor	Nominated
16th Visual Effects Society Awards	Outstanding Animated Character in an Animated Feature	Arthur Terzis, Wei Hei, Jean-Marc Ariu, Gibson Radsavanh for "Garma Mecha Man"	Nominated
16th Visual Effects Society Awards	Outstanding Animated Character in an Animated Feature	Matthew Everitt, Christian So, Loic Miermont, Fiona Darwin for "Garmadon"	Nominated
16th Visual Effects Society Awards	Outstanding Created Environment in an Animated Feature	Kim Taylor, Angela Ensele, Felicity Coonan, Jean Pascal leBlanc for "Ninjago City"	Nominated

== Future ==
On 31 October 2024, Deadline Hollywood reported that a live-action Ninjago film from Universal Pictures is in development, with Dan and Kevin Hageman attached to pen the script. By the time the film was announced, Warner Bros. had terminated their film rights to the Lego brand by the fall of 2019 following The Lego Movie 2: The Second Part's disappointing box office returns, which led Universal to enter early negotiations with Lego for a new first-look deal in December of that year, eventually acquiring the rights to the brand in April 2020, which was set for a five-year deal.

At the L.A. Comic Con 2026, the Hageman brothers confirmed that they had finished a script for the live-action Ninjago film but that the movie still has to be greenlit.
