= Lego BrickHeadz =

Lego theme

- Sub‑themes: Avatar, Back to the Future, DC Super Heroes, Disney, Fortnite, Ghostbusters, Go Brick Me, Harry Poter, Jurassic World, Looney Tunes, Marvel Super Heroes, Minecraft, Minions: The Rise of Gru, Miscellaneous, Monkie Kid, Pets, Seasonal, The Lord of the Rings, Star Wars, The Lego Movie 2: The Second Part, The Lego Batman Movie, The Lego Ninjago Movie, Lego Ninjago, Looney Tunes, Sonic the Hedgehog, Stranger Things, The Simpsons, Transformers, Universal Monsters, and Wedding
- Subject: Buildable characters
- Availability: 2016–present
- Total sets: 168; 263 (numbered figures)
- Official website

Lego BrickHeadz is a Lego theme of buildable figurines that can be recognized by their oversized, cube-like heads. Many, but not all, are reimaginings of existing characters from properties like DC, Marvel Comics, Star Wars, and Disney. The theme was first introduced in 2016.

== Overview ==
The BrickHeadz line focuses on buildable characters. Each set measures over 2 inches (5.1 cm) tall. The legs are 4 Lego plates tall and are usually constructed from four 1-stud-by-2-stud plates. The torso is usually constructed on a square 4-stud plate, and is two Lego bricks and one plate high. The arms are usually formed around a square two-stud plate, and use 1-by-2-stud plates with a clip (part 11476) for the hands. Though the head is the most distinctive part, the core of it is the simplest (and common to all models). Twelve 2-brick-tall pieces with studs on one side (part 22885) are mounted on a 4-stud square plate or equivalent. The included baseplates, on which the characters stand, measure over 4 cm square and under 1 cm high.

BrickHeadz sets were designed primarily for children with an age rating of 10+ or above.

In 2020, Lego Masters USA judge and Lego design lead Amy Corbett recreated her outfits from the show using BrickHeadz models.

== Development ==
Upon launch, Lego BrickHeadz was a new line of collectible figures. BrickHeadz is designed for kids interested in Lego but without the time to spend building: each collectible figure takes approximately 10 to 15 minutes to create. Michael McNally, senior director of brand relations for Lego, explained, "This sort of one-size-fits-all approach is not as appealing as it used to be," and continued, "The onus then is really on brands to diversify their offerings so that there is something for everyone. We'll always have free-form, open-ended building opportunities, but we're always looking for surgical ways we can manipulate the Lego system in a way that might grab the attention of a completely different kid who needs a different solution."

Marcos Bessa discussed the development process of BrickHeadz and explained, "First and foremost we explore what characters we want to do. For series 1, we started with some safe bets but also some strong line ups to attract attention and create a culture around what we believe will be strong long lasting series. We have a very important mission at Lego with this product line which is that we want to engage kids that are not into roleplaying any more because they feel that Lego is a 'toy' and that they are too old for it. We want to offer something that allows them to create something interesting with characters they can relate to and also give them a nice classic building experience. The purpose of the line is to reach out to those who are not so much into Lego because they don't know Lego beyond that of a toy. This offers that extra layer of collectibility which they could easily put on their computer or next to their television."

BrickHeadz designer Austin Carlson discussed designing a BrickHeadz model and explained, "The start is a lot like a Lego Minifigure where I note the most important icons of the character and start from there. So for example, the startup for the Comic Con Joker BrickHead was intended to be more 'classic' Joker so we wanted a tuxedo suit feel and a more slick back pointy hair for him. And the Joker is always known for his smile so we knew we needed that and Nic Groves added his big flower to him to capture his tricky clown nature. The same could be said with Superman's traditional curly-Q hair and how we captured that through a Unikitty tail".

During the Lego Fan Media Days in 2017, Carlson and Bessa discussed how they came about and what the future held for the series. Austin Carlson explained, "In the earliest stages things did change around. If you look at the original elephant [prototype that inspired the BrickHeadz line], you can see there is a lack of real hands, and the base was slightly different. Then we needed them to be able to hold accessories; we needed printed eyes, decoration, things like that. So there was an evolution of the design, and as it became more defined we developed a set style guide." and continued, "Specifically, it defined the height of the body, the legs, the arms. Where we start to play around a little bit is usually with accessories and the hair, what's iconic to the character. The one that I keep referencing is Black Widow, because of the amount of detail in the hair. But it makes a silhouette of the character that’s easily recognisable; it's the same thing with Batman and the pointy ears. So when it comes to head accessories and items, stuff like that, we need to make sure it's included, but at the same time we still have to meet our own style guide, much like how every minifigure is designed." Bessa explained, "The more characters we create and bring to the family, the more questions it raises [about the core design]. There are characters that make an exception to what we created as a core, and then we have to figure out how we represent this thing, this detail. So it's always interesting to have these challenges".

Carlson discussed his role as graphic designer and his input to the collectable minifigure series, saying, "My involvement on BrickHeadz has been completely handed over to Marcos now. I was originally hired as a graphic designer, that's my job title, so for the first series of BrickHeadz I was juggling building and doing graphic design at the same time. It was a difficult task because I had to balance them, but now all the responsibility for BrickHeadz has been handed over, I can go back to focusing completely on the collectable minifigure series, and other graphic design related work."

Bessa discussed ideas for characters that end up not fitting the BrickHeadz style: "We've had a couple that turned out to be a bit more challenging in execution, that we have paused and might then revisit to see if we find new solutions. Maybe in the future a new part gets developed that suddenly triggers that solution that we haven't come up with. But there are also certain characters that just completely challenge the form, because BrickHeadz is primarily a small little square body with a huge head, and if you look at something like Blue, the raptor from Jurassic World, it challenges the whole form. That was a particularly hard one to execute. But we feel that we still managed to get a pretty recognisable and cool model that stays true to what the reference is, but also stays true to what BrickHeadz are.

Bessa also discussed the two new types of glasses from the Go Brick Me set (41957) — a set which allows builders to create their own custom BrickHeadz figures — and explained, "The brief for the BrickHeadz line actually came with a request to do something like this. The idea for the Go Brick Me set came very early, in early 2017, so the brand was just about to come out officially on the market. We were already planning what to do for 2018 and so the importance of customisation, allowing people to represent their features was of key importance for this. So we immediately started looking into what that would mean in terms of new elements – how to make glasses, do we need something new? I started exploring and came up with a whole lot of variations of new elements that we could make, trying to come up with something that would work and fulfil the brief for this purpose, but become a versatile enough element that it could become interesting for other uses. And I think we ended up finding something that is pretty cool for what we do in the set, but also offers a lot of other opportunities, and I'm really looking forward to seeing what comes out of it."

== Launch ==
The Lego BrickHeadz theme was officially launched at San Diego Comic-Con in 2017. Convention-exclusive two-packs were only available at the Lego booth, with characters based on DC and Marvel properties including Captain America, Wonder Woman, and The Joker.

In 2019, Lego design manager Marcos Bessa announced the BrickHeadz theme would continue into 2020 and expand with more licensed characters.

== Sub-themes ==
According to BrickLink, the Lego Group has released 168 playsets as part of the BrickHeadz theme as of March 2025. These sets contain a total of 263 numbered figures.

=== IP-based ===
==== Avatar ====
In 2022, the Lego Group revealed at San Diego Comic-Con a brand new set named Jake Sully & his Avatar (set 40554), based on James Cameron's Avatar film series. The set went on sale on 1 October 2022 and consists of 246 pieces and a baseplate. The set includes two versions of Jake Sully, one in his human form with a wheelchair and the other in his Avatar form with a spear.

==== Back to the Future ====
Marty McFly & Doc Brown (set 41611) was released on 18 April 2018 and is based on the film Back to the Future (1985). The set consists of 240 pieces and two baseplates, and includes a detachable accessories: a DeLorean time machine controller for Brown and a camcorder for McFly.

==== DC ====
In 2016, several exclusive BrickHeadz sets were only available at San Diego Comic-Con: Superman & Wonder Woman (set 41490); Batman & The Joker (set 41491); and Supergirl & Martian Manhunter (set 41496).

Several Lego DC characters based on the movie Justice League (2017) were released as BrickHeadz sets. A range of DC BrickHeadz was announced in January 2018, which included The Flash (set 41598), Wonder Woman (set 41599), Aquaman (set 41600), Cyborg (set 41601), and Tactical Batman & Superman (set 41610).

==== Disney ====
In 2017, two sets based on the animated film Beauty and the Beast (1991) — Belle (set 41595) and Beast (set 41596) — were released on 1 March. Later, Captain Jack Sparrow (set 41593) and Captain Armando Salazar (set 41594) were released on 2 April 2017, based on the movie Pirates of the Caribbean: Dead Men Tell No Tales.

Mr. Incredible & Frozone (set 41613; 160 pieces) was released in April 2018, based on Incredibles 2. Elsa (set 41617) and Anna & Olaf (set 41618) from Frozen were released in July 2018. Ariel & Ursula (set 41623; 361 pieces) was released in July 2018 and is based on The Little Mermaid (1989). From The Nightmare Before Christmas, Jack Skellington & Sally (set 41630; 193 pieces) was released in October 2018.

Disney characters Donald Duck (set 40377) and Goofy & Pluto (set 40378) were released in February 2020. Mickey Mouse (set 41624) and Minnie Mouse (set 41625) were released as separate sets in August 2020.

Daisy Duck (set 40476) and Scrooge McDuck, Huey, Dewey & Louie (set 40477) were released in June 2021. In December 2021, the Lego Group revealed two new sets: Buzz Lightyear (set 40552; 114 pieces) and Woody & Bo Peep (set 40553; 296 pieces), released in February 2022 and based on Toy Story.

A kit of the animated characters Chip & Dale (set 40550; 226 pieces) was released on 1 March 2022, based on the show Chip 'n Dale: Rescue Rangers.

Disney 100th Celebration (set 40622; 501 pieces) was released on 1 February 2023 and includes the characters Oswald the Lucky Rabbit, Mickey Mouse (as seen in Steamboat Willie), Snow White, and Tinker Bell. In addition, EVE & WALL•E (set 40619), Cruella & Maleficent (set 40620), and Moana & Merida (set 40621) were released on 1 March 2023.

==== Ghostbusters ====
Based on the film Ghostbusters, Peter Venkman & Slimer (set 41622; 228 pieces) was released on 1 July 2018. The set includes Venkman's proton pack and Slimer's hot dogs.

==== Harry Potter ====
Several Lego Wizarding World based on Harry Potter series have been released as part of the Lego BrickHeadz theme. A range of Wizarding World BrickHeadz was announced in October 2018, which included Newt Scamander & Gellert Grindelwald (set number: 41631), Ron Weasley & Albus Dumbledore (set number: 41621), Hermione Granger (set number: 41616) and Harry Potter & Hedwig (set number: 41615).

In 2020, Hagrid & Buckbeak (set number: 40412) was a free gift with qualifying purchases in Lego store.

In 2021, Harry, Hermione, Ron & Hagrid (set number: 40495) and Voldemort, Nagini & Bellatrix (set number: 40496) was released in June 2021.

In 2022, Professors of Hogwarts (set number: 40560) was released in June 2022. The set consists of 601 pieces with 4 baseplates. The set included Professors Severus Snape, Minerva McGonagall, Alastor 'Mad-Eye' Moody and Sybill Trelawney.

In 2023, Harry Potter & Cho Chang (set number: 40616), Draco Malfoy & Cedric Diggory (set number: 40617) and Kingsley Shacklebolt & Nymphadora Tonks (set number: 40618) were released on 1 June 2023.

==== Jurassic World: Fallen Kingdom ====
Owen & Blue (set 41614; 234 pieces) was released on 17 April 2018, based on the film Jurassic World: Fallen Kingdom (2018). The set includes Owen's tranquilizer gun and the Velociraptor Blue's white teeth.

==== Looney Tunes ====
Wile E. Coyote and the Road Runner (set 40559; 205 pieces), based on the Looney Tunes characters, was released on 1 February 2022.

==== Marvel ====
In 2016, three exclusive sets were only available at San Diego Comic-Con: Iron Man & Captain America (set 41492), Black Panther & Doctor Strange (set 41493), and Spider-Man & Venom (set 41497).

Captain America (set 41589), Iron Man (set 41590), Black Widow (set 41591), and The Hulk (set 41592) were released in March 2017.

Iron Man MK50 (set 41604), Thanos (set 41605), Star-Lord (set 41606), and Gamora (set 41607) were released on 2 April 2018 and are based on the film Avengers: Endgame. Later, Groot & Rocket (set 41626) was released on 2 October 2018.

==== Minecraft ====
Based on the video game Minecraft, Steve & Creeper (set 41612; 160 pieces) was released in August 2018. Three more Minecraft sets — Alex (set 40624), Llama (set 40625), and Zombie (set 40626) — were released on 1 April 2023.

==== Minions: The Rise of Gru ====
Two sets based on the animated film Minions: The Rise of Gru — Gru, Stuart and Otto (set 40420) and Belle Bottom, Kevin and Bob (set 40421) — were released in April 2021.

==== One Piece ====
Two sets based on the television series One Piece — Monkey D. Luffy (set 40799) and Buggy the Clown (set 40800) — were released in June 2025.

==== Sonic the Hedgehog ====
Sonic the Hedgehog (set 40627; 139 pieces) and Miles "Tails" Prower (set 40628; 131 pieces) were released on 1 September 2023, based on the Sonic the Hedgehog video game series.

==== Star Wars ====
Several Lego Star Wars characters have also been released as part of the Lego BrickHeadz theme. A range of Lego Star Wars BrickHeadz was announced in 2017, which included Finn (set number: 41485), Captain Phasma (set number: 41486), Rey (set number: 41602), Kylo Ren (set number: 41603), Han Solo (set number: 41608), Chewbacca (set number: 41609), Darth Vader (set number: 41619), Stormtrooper (set number: 41620), Luke Skywalker & Yoda (set number: 41627), Leia Organa (set number: 41628), Boba Fett (set number: 41629), Boba Fett and Han Solo in Carbonite (set number: 41498) and Kylo Ren & Sith Trooper (set number: 75232) as buildable characters.

The Mandalorian & The Child (set number: 75317) was released on 20 February 2020 and based on The Mandalorian TV series. The set consists of 295 pieces and 2 baseplates. The set included Mandalorian's a blaster rifle clipped on the back and a blaster pistol in hand and The Child's a hoverpram.

Ahsoka Tano (set number: 40539) was released in January 2022 and based on Star Wars: The Clone Wars TV series. The set consists of 164 pieces and a baseplate. The set included Ahsoka Tano's two lightsabers. Ahsoka Tano (set number: 40539) has come full circle as Lego Ideas hosts a model showcase to mark the revealed of the 150th BrickHeadz.

Obi-Wan Kenobi & Darth Vader (set number: 40547) was released in August 2022 and based on Obi-Wan Kenobi TV series. The set consists of 260 pieces and two baseplates. The set included Obi-Wan Kenobi's lightsaber and Darth Vader's lightsaber.

Tusken Raider (set number: 40615) was released in January 2023 and based on Star Wars: Episode IV – A New Hope film. The set consists of 152 pieces and a baseplate.

Battle of Endor Heroes (set number: 40623) will be released in May 2023 and based on Star Wars: Episode VI – Return of the Jedi film. The set consists of 549 pieces and five baseplates. The set included Luke Skywalker, R2-D2, Lando Calrissian, Wicket and Princess Leia.

==== Stranger Things ====
Demogorgon & Eleven (set number: 40549) was released on 1 February 2022 and based on the Stranger Things Netflix sci-fi horror series. The set consists of 192 pieces and 2 baseplates.

==== The Lego Batman Movie ====
Several The Lego Batman Movie characters have also been released as part of the Lego BrickHeadz theme. A range of The Lego Batman Movie BrickHeadz was announced on 1 March 2017, which included Batman (set number: 41585), Batgirl (set number: 41586), Robin (set number: 41587) and The Joker (set number: 41588) as buildable characters.

==== The Lego Movie 2: The Second Part ====
Several The Lego Movie 2: The Second Part characters have also been released as part of the Lego BrickHeadz theme. A range of The Lego Movie 2: The Second Part BrickHeadz was announced in 2019, which included Emmet (set number: 41634), Wyldstyle (set number: 41635), Benny (set number: 41636) and Sweet Mayhem (set number: 41637) as buildable characters.

==== The Lego Ninjago Movie ====
Several The Lego Ninjago Movie characters have also been released as part of the Lego BrickHeadz theme. A range of The Lego Ninjago Movie BrickHeadz was announced in September 2017, which included Lloyd (set number: 41487) and Master Wu (set number: 41488) as buildable characters.

==== The Lord of the Rings ====
Frodo & Gollum (set number: 40630), Gandalf the Grey & Balrog (set number: 40631) and Aragorn & Arwen (set number: 40632) were released on 1 January 2023 and based on The Lord of the Rings film trilogy.

==== The Simpsons ====
Homer Simpson & Krusty the Clown (set number: 41632) was released on 2 October 2018 and based on The Simpsons television series. The set consists of 215 pieces and 2 baseplates.

==== Transformers ====
Optimus Prime (set number: 40803) was released on

==== Universal Monsters ====
"Frankenstein" (set 40422) was released on 17 September 2020 and is based on the Universal Monsters character of Frankenstein's monster. The set consists of 108 pieces and a baseplate.

=== Original themes ===
Geoffrey (set number: 40316) was an exclusive set only available at Toys "R" Us.

Lady Liberty (set number: 40367) was released on 4 July 2019. The set consists of 153 pieces and baseplate.

Spice Girls Tribute (set number: 40548) was released on 1 March 2018 and based on Spice Girls are a British girl group from England. The set consists of 578 pieces and 5 baceplates. Lego Designer Daniel Squirrell discussed the process behind Spice Girls Tribute (set number: 40548) and how important it was to get the fine details just right to pay homage to the band. Lego Designer Daniel Squirrell explained, “The band members have famous outfits and iconic looks, like Geri’s Union Jack dress, Mel B’s trademark leopard print, Emma’s baby-pink dresses and pigtails, Melanie C’s tracksuits and of course Victoria’s little black dress,” and continued, “They have a meaningful history in British music and the youth of many of my peers, so it was important to reference these moments for the fans.”

Wedding Bride (set number: 40383) and Wedding Groom (set number: 40384) were released in January 2020. The Wedding Bride set consists of 306 pieces and Wedding Groom set consists of 255 pieces.

==== Go Brick Me ====
A set featuring a range of 708 pieces allowing the creation of two custom BrickHeadz, called Go Brick Me (set 41597), was released on 2 April 2018.

In 2022, the Lego Group revealed at LEGO CON 2022 a brand new set named FC Barcelona Go Brick Me (set 40542), released on 1 August 2022. The set consists of 530 pieces and 1 baseplate and includes 3 different skin tones, 4 different hair colors, and a variety of hair styles. Manchester United Go Brick Me (set 40541) was released on 1 August 2022.

==== Monkie Kid ====
Monkey King (set 40381; 175 pieces) was released on 1 August 2020 and is based on the Lego Monkie Kid theme; the set includes a Golden Staff.

==== Ninjago ====
Several Lego Ninjago characters have also been released as part of the Lego BrickHeadz theme. A range of 10th anniversary BrickHeadz was announced in May 2021, which included Golden Lloyd, Nya Samurai X, and Firstbourne Dragon as buildable characters.

==== Pets ====
Several Lego Pets characters have also been released as part of the Lego BrickHeadz theme. A range of Lego Pets BrickHeadz was announced in 2021, which included German Shepherd (set number: 40440), Shorthair Cats (set number: 40441), Goldfish (set number: 40442), Budgie, Dalmatian (set number: 40479), Ginger Tabby (set number: 40480), Cockatiel (set number: 40481) and Hamster (set number: 40482).

St. Bernard (set number: 40543) and French Bulldog (set number: 40544) was released in January 2022.

Koi Fish (set number: 40545) and Poodles (set number: 40546) were released in August 2022.

==== Promotional ====
Nonnie - Inside Tour 2017 Edition, Amsterdam BrickHeadz, Beijing BrickHeadz, Cologne BrickHeadz and Hangzhou Brickheadz was released as promotion.

==== Seasonal ====
Several seasonal characters have also been released as part of the Lego BrickHeadz theme. A range of seasonal BrickHeadz was announced in 2018, which included Valentine's Bee (set 40270), Easter Bunny (set 40271), Halloween Witch (set 40272), Thanksgiving Turkey (set 40273) and Mr. & Mrs. Claus (set 40274).

Seasonal BrickHeadz released in 2019 include Birthday Clown (set 40348), Valentine's Puppy (set 40349), Easter Chick (set 40350), Halloween Ghost (set 40351), Thanksgiving Scarecrow (set 40352), Reindeer, Elf & Elfie (set 40353), and Dragon Dance Guy (set 40354).

In 2020, seasonal BrickHeadz included Valentine's Bear (set 40379), Easter Sheep (set 40380), Nutcracker (set 40425), and Lucky Cat (set 40436).

Sets released in 2021 include Chinese New Year Pandas (set 40466; 249 pieces), which came with a lantern and a buildable mandarin orange tree, and La Catrina (set 40492; 141 pieces).

Lion Dance Guy (set 40540; 239 pieces) was released in January 2022.

== App ==
An app titled Lego BrickHeadz Builder was developed by The Lego Group for Android and released on 12 July 2018.

== Reception ==
In 2019, Harry Potter and Hedwig (set 41615) was listed as one of the top ten best-selling Harry Potter toys in the UK for the 12 months ending May 2019.

== See also ==
- Lego Avatar
- Lego Super Heroes
- The Lego Movie (Lego theme)
- The Lego Ninjago Movie (Lego theme)
- Lego Ninjago
- Lego Ghostbusters
- Lego Harry Potter
- Lego Disney
- Lego Star Wars
- LEGO Jurassic World
- Lego Stranger Things
- Lego Minions: The Rise of Gru
- Lego Minecraft
- Lego Monkie Kid
- Lego The Lord of the Rings
- Lego The Simpsons
