= Penguin in other media =

Appearances of the DC villain outside comics

Adaptations of Penguin in other media
- Danny DeVito as the Penguin in Batman Returns (1992)
- Original source: Comics published by DC Comics
- First appearance: Detective Comics #58 (December 1941)

Films and television
- Film(s): See below
- Television show(s): See below

The supervillain The Penguin, created by Bob Kane and Bill Finger, made his first appearance in Detective Comics #58 (December 1941). Since then, he has been adapted into other forms of media, including feature films, television series, and video games.

== Television ==
=== Live-action ===
Burgess Meredith as the Penguin in Batman

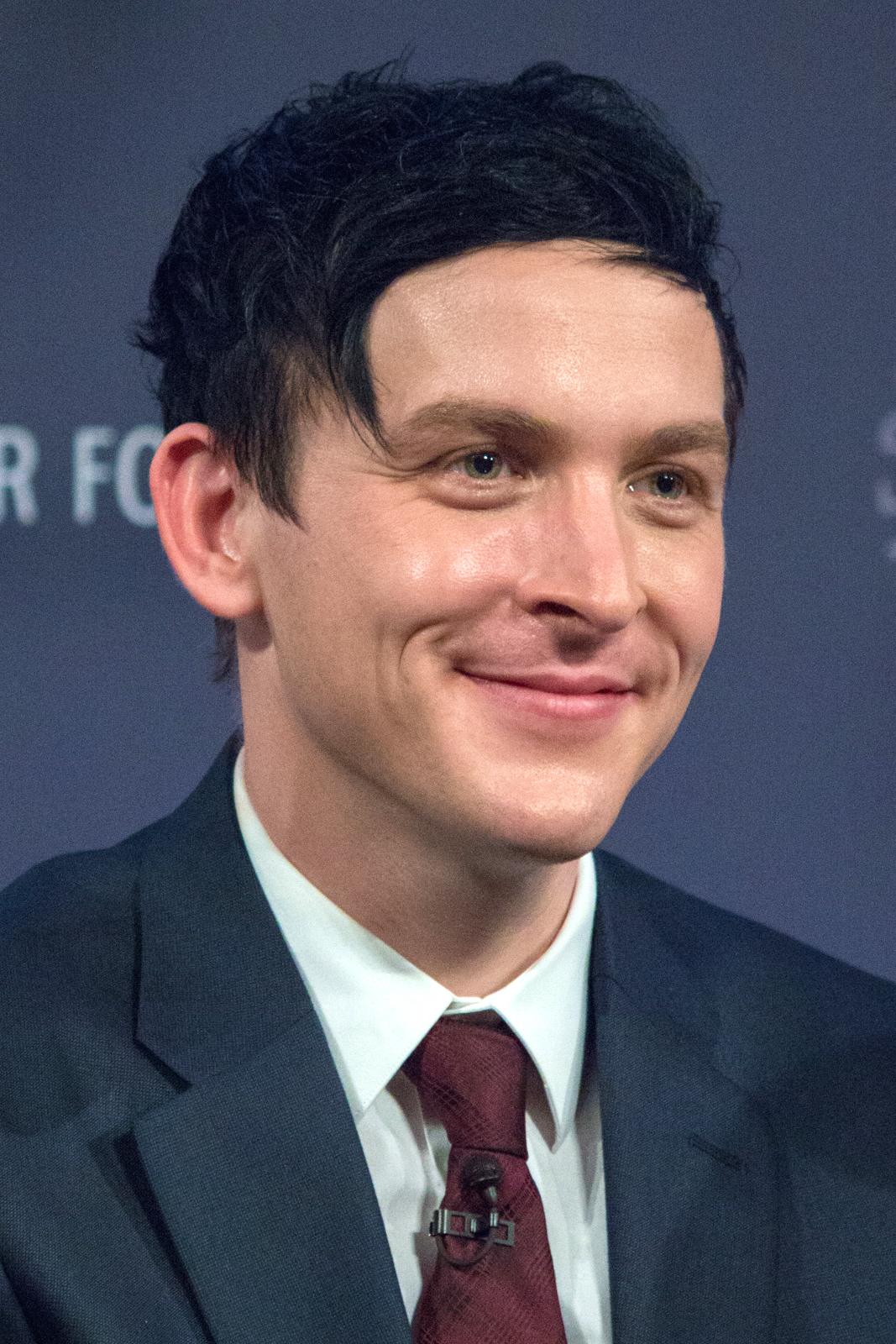
Robin Lord Taylor, who portrays a young Oswald Cobblepot in Gotham

- The Penguin appears in Batman (1966), portrayed by Burgess Meredith. This version possesses a "quacking" laugh, which covered a cough caused by cigarette usage.
- A Warner Bros. licensed 1991 Filipino parody film Alyas Batman en Robin features Panchito as Tio Paenguin, the film's version of Penguin.
- A young Oswald Cobblepot appears in Gotham, portrayed by Robin Lord Taylor. The series follows his journey to power, starting as a ruthless small-time criminal working for mobster Fish Mooney and his love–hate relationship with fellow criminal Edward Nygma.
- The Batman (2022) incarnation of Oswald Cobb / Penguin appears in a self-titled spin-off series, portrayed again by Colin Farrell. This series expands on his portrayal, depicting him as suffering from a clubfoot, displaying an Oedipal dynamic with his senile mother Francis, and having history with the Falcone crime family and Rex Calabrese.

=== Animation ===
Penguin, as he appears in Batman: The Animated Series (left) and The New Batman Adventures (right)

- The Penguin appears in The Adventures of Batman, voiced by Ted Knight.
- The Penguin appears in The New Scooby-Doo Movies, voiced again by Ted Knight.
- The Penguin was set to appear in Challenge of the Superfriends as a member of the Legion of Doom. However, due to the development of The New Adventures of Batman, the Penguin was removed.
- The Penguin appears in The New Adventures of Batman, voiced by Lennie Weinrib.
- The Penguin appears in The Super Powers Team: Galactic Guardians episode "The Case of the Stolen Powers", voiced by Robert Morse.
- The Penguin appears in television series set in the DC Animated Universe (DCAU), voiced by Paul Williams. This version's initial design is visually inspired by the Batman Returns incarnation before he was redesigned to more resemble his comic counterpart.
  - The Penguin first appears in Batman: The Animated Series (1992), where he is served by several henchmen - Jay, Raven, Eagleton, Falcone, and Sheldrake - as well as trained birds.
  - The Penguin appears in The New Batman Adventures, in which he has founded the Iceberg Lounge and seemingly reformed while secretly continuing his criminal activities.
  - The Penguin appears in the Superman: The Animated Series episode "Knight Time".
- The Penguin appears in The Batman (2004), voiced by Tom Kenny. This version turned to crime to rebuild his wealth and re-establish his family name. Additionally, he is aided by two silent henchmen, the Kabuki Twins, whom he recruited during a trip to China, and has history with Alfred Pennyworth's family.
- The Penguin appears in Batman: The Brave and the Bold, voiced by Stephen Root.
- The Penguin appears in the Robot Chicken DC Comics Special, Robot Chicken DC Comics Special 2: Villains in Paradise, and Robot Chicken DC Comics Special III: Magical Friendship, voiced by Seth Green. This version is a member of the Legion of Doom.
- The Penguin makes a cameo appearance in the Beware the Batman episode "Animal" via a wanted poster.
- The Penguin appears in DC Super Friends, voiced by Dana Snyder.
- The Penguin appears in Justice League Action, voiced again by Dana Snyder.
- The Penguin appears in the first two seasons of Harley Quinn, voiced by Wayne Knight. This version is Jewish, has a nephew named Joshua (voiced by Sean Giambrone), and appears as a member of the Legion of Doom in the first season and the Injustice League in the second season. In the latter season, he and the League take over Gotham City after the Joker destroys it before Harley Quinn kills him in retaliation for being excluded from the League.
  - A young Penguin appears in the Kite Man: Hell Yeah! episode "Portal Potty, Hell Yeah!", voiced by James Adomian.
- The Penguin appears in the DC Super Hero Girls episode "#EmperorPenguin", voiced by Alexander Polinsky.
- The Penguin appears in Batwheels, voiced by Jess Harnell.
- A female version of the Penguin named Oswalda Cobblepot appears in the Batman: Caped Crusader episode "In Treacherous Waters", voiced by Minnie Driver. She is the mother of Aaron and Ronald Cobblepot (both voiced by Paul Scheer) and a rival of Rupert Thorne.

== Film ==
=== Live-action ===
Colin Farrell as the Penguin, as depicted in The Batman (2022)

- The Batman (1966) incarnation of the Penguin appears in the series' film adaptation, portrayed again by Burgess Meredith.
- Oswald Cobblepot / The Penguin appears in Batman Returns, portrayed by Danny DeVito. As an infant, this version was left for dead by his family due to birth defects before he is found by penguins from a condemned Gotham City zoo. As a child, he joined the Red Triangle Circus Gang as part of their freak show before eventually taking over. DeVito's portrayal as the Penguin was largely praised. Additionally, DeVito was suggested for the role by his friend Nicholson following Batman (1989)'s success. According to DeVito, "It was four-and-a-half hours of makeup and getting into the costume. We got it down to three hours by the end of the shoot". Uncredited script doctor, Wesley Strick, recalled, "When I was hired to write [Batman Returns], the big problem of the script was the Penguin's lack of a 'master plan'." He took inspiration from a Moses parallel that had the Penguin killing the firstborn sons of Gotham. A similar notion was used when the Penguin's parents threw him into a river as a baby. While this Penguin retained many trademarks, such as his top hat, a variety of trick umbrellas and the use of a monocle, he was given a dramatic visual makeover. Where the comic version varies between having a balding head of short cropped hair and varying degrees of thinning, this Penguin is still bald at the top but with his remaining length of hair long and stringy. His hands are flippers with a thumb and index finger, and the remaining three fingers fused together. An unidentified thick, dark green bile-like liquid sometimes trickles from his nose and mouth. Instead of a tuxedo, he wears a more gothic, Victorian-style outfit with a jabot as opposed to a bow tie. In certain scenes, he also wears black boots, a dickey, and a union suit. He also has a penguin-like appetite, as shown in a scene where he devours a raw fish, and uses a vehicle shaped like a giant rubber duck to move around the sewers and the city. Janet Maslin in The New York Times described DeVito as "conveying verve". Peter Travers in Rolling Stone wrote that "DeVito's mutant Penguin — a balloon-bellied Richard III with a kingdom of sewer freaks — is as hilariously warped as Jack Nicholson's Joker and even quicker with the quips." Desson Howe in The Washington Post wrote that the Penguin holds court in a penguin-crowded, Phantom of the Opera-like sewer home. He also described DeVito as "exquisite". Roger Ebert of the Chicago Sun-Times compared the Penguin negatively with the Joker of the first film, writing that "the Penguin is a curiously meager and depressing creature; I pitied him, but did not fear him or find him funny. The genius of Danny DeVito is all but swallowed up in the paraphernalia of the role." Jonathan Rosenbaum called DeVito "a pale substitute for Jack Nicholson from the first film" and felt that "there's no suspense in Batman Returns whatsoever".
- Oswald "Oz" Cobb / The Penguin appears in The Batman (2022), portrayed by Colin Farrell, who received DeVito's blessing for the role. This version acts as the right-hand man of crime lord Carmine Falcone and resents his "Penguin" nickname, given to him in mockery of his clubfoot.

=== Animation ===
- The DCAU incarnation of the Penguin appears in Batman: Mystery of the Batwoman, voiced by David Ogden Stiers.
- The Batman (2004) incarnation of the Penguin appears in The Batman vs. Dracula, voiced again by Tom Kenny.
- The Penguin appears in Lego Batman: The Movie – DC Super Heroes Unite, voiced by Steve Blum.
- The Penguin appears in Batman: Assault on Arkham, voiced by Nolan North.
- The Penguins appears in Lego DC Comics: Batman Be-Leaguered, voiced again by Tom Kenny.
- The Penguin appears in Lego DC Comics Super Heroes: Justice League vs. Bizarro League, voiced again by Tom Kenny.
- The Penguin appears in the Batman Unlimited series of films, voiced again by Dana Snyder. This version is the leader of the Animilitia who possesses a robotic monocle.
- The Penguin appears in Lego DC Comics Super Heroes: Justice League: Attack of the Legion of Doom, voiced again by Tom Kenny. This version is a member of the Legion of Doom.
- The Penguin makes a cameo appearance in Batman: Bad Blood.
- The Penguin appears in Lego DC Comics Super Heroes: Justice League: Gotham City Breakout, voiced again by Tom Kenny.
- The Batman (1966) incarnation of the Penguin appears in Batman: Return of the Caped Crusaders and Batman vs. Two-Face, voiced by William Salyers.
- The Penguin appears in The Lego Batman Movie, voiced by an uncredited John Venzon.
- The Penguin appears in DC Super Heroes vs. Eagle Talon, voiced by Mitsuo Iwata.
- The Penguin appears in Scooby-Doo! & Batman: The Brave and the Bold, voiced again by Tom Kenny.
- The Penguin appears in Lego DC Comics Super Heroes: The Flash, voiced again by Tom Kenny.
- A Feudal Japan-inspired incarnation of the Penguin appears in Batman Ninja, voiced by Chō in the Japanese dub and again by Tom Kenny in the English dub.
- The Penguin appears in Batman vs. Teenage Mutant Ninja Turtles, voiced again by Tom Kenny.
- The Penguin appears in Lego DC Batman: Family Matters, voiced again by Tom Kenny.
- The Penguin appears in Lego DC Shazam! Magic and Monsters, voiced again by Tom Kenny.
- The Penguin appears in Batman: The Long Halloween, voiced by David Dastmalchian.
- The Penguin appears in Batman and Superman: Battle of the Super Sons, voiced again by Tom Kenny.
- The Penguin appears in Batman: The Doom That Came to Gotham, voiced again by William Salyers. This version is a professor and explorer who helped found Gotham City in the 1600s and gained longevity through dark magic. In the 1920s, he embarks on an expedition to Antarctica, coming to live with its penguin population after the deaths of his crewmates and his mutation caused by Iog-Sotha.
- The Penguin appears in Merry Little Batman, voiced by Brian George. This version is elderly and confined to a mobility scooter.
- The Penguin appears in Aztec Batman: Clash of Empires. This version is a plague doctor.

== Video games ==
- The Penguin appears as a boss in Batman: The Caped Crusader.
- The Penguin, based on Danny DeVito's portrayal, appears as a boss in the Batman Returns tie-in game,
- The Penguin appears as a boss in Batman: The Animated Series (1993).
- The Penguin was set to appear in The Adventures of Batman & Robin before he was cut.
- The Penguin appears in DC Universe Online, voiced by David Jennison. This version runs a smuggling operation in Gotham City's old subway tunnels.
- The Penguin appears as a character summon in Scribblenauts Unmasked: A DC Comics Adventure.
- The Penguin appears in Batman (2013), voiced by Brian Silva.
- The Penguin makes a non-speaking cameo appearance in Injustice: Gods Among Us via the Arkham Asylum stage.
- The Penguin appears in Batman: The Telltale Series, voiced by Jason Spisak as an adult and by Cole Sand as a child. This version is a childhood friend of Bruce Wayne and a member of the Children of Arkham terrorist group whose name is derived from a beak-shaped gas mask he wears during his crimes. Additionally, he seeks revenge on the Wayne family after Bruce's father Thomas Wayne had the Penguin's mother Esther drugged, rendered psychotic, and forcibly committed to Arkham Asylum for refusing to sell land she owned to him. Due to his friendship with Bruce, the Penguin attempts to warn him about the Children of Arkham's plans before helping them attack Gotham City, during which he may scar Harvey Dent depending on the player's choices, before he is eventually defeated by Batman.
- The Penguin was set to appear as a playable character in Injustice 2, but was cut for unknown reasons.
- The Penguin appears in Gotham Knights, voiced by Elias Toufexis. This version retired from supervillainy to operate the Iceberg Lounge. Additionally, his mother is secretly a member of the Court of Owls.

=== Lego Batman ===
- The Penguin appears as a boss in Lego Batman: The Videogame, voiced again by Tom Kenny.
- The Penguin appears as a boss in Lego Batman 2: DC Super Heroes, voiced by Steve Blum.
- The Penguin appears as a playable character in Lego Batman 3: Beyond Gotham, voiced by JB Blanc.
- The Penguin appears in Lego DC Super-Villains, voiced again by JB Blanc. This version is a member of the Legion of Doom.
- The Penguin, based on his appearance in Batman Returns and The Batman, appears in Lego Batman: Legacy of the Dark Knight, voiced by Ian Conningham.

=== Batman: Arkham ===
The Penguin appears in the Batman: Arkham franchise, voiced primarily by Nolan North and by Ian Redford in Batman: Arkham VR. This version's monocle is part of a broken glass bottle that was shoved into his face and became lodged too deeply to safely remove. He also speaks with an East London dialect, which is heavily implied to be an attempt at making himself more intimidating to his followers.

- The Penguin first appears in Batman: Arkham City as a criminal kingpin of the titular city prison until he is defeated by Batman and imprisoned by Mr. Freeze.
- A young Penguin appears in Batman: Arkham Origins as a weapons dealer based in a refitted cruise liner called the Final Offer until he is arrested in the Cold, Cold Heart DLC following a failed alliance with Mr. Freeze.
- A young Penguin appears in Batman: Arkham Origins Blackgate, having taken over part of the eponymous prison amidst a breakout.
- The Penguin appears in Batman: Arkham Knight as a gunrunner until he is defeated, captured, and incarcerated by Batman and Nightwing. He would attempt to escape captivity in the GCPD Lockdown DLC, only to be thwarted by Nightwing once again.
- The Penguin appears in Batman: Arkham VR.
- The Penguin appears in Suicide Squad: Kill the Justice League. He is forcibly recruited into the Suicide Squad to provide anti-metahuman weaponry.
- The Penguin appears in Batman: Arkham Shadow.

== Merchandise ==
- The Penguin received an 8" figure from the Mego Corporation via their "World's Greatest Super-Heroes" line in 1974.
- The Penguin received a 3 3/4" figure from the Mego Corporation via their Comic Action Heroes line in the 1970s.
- The Penguin received a minifigure in the Lego Batman set The Batcave: The Penguin and Mr. Freeze's Invasion.
- The Penguin received a figure in the Super Powers Collection toy line in the 1980s.
- The Batman Returns incarnation of the Penguin received a figure in the film's tie-in toy line.
- The DCAU incarnation of the Penguin, based on his Batman: The Animated Series design, received a figure in the series' tie-in toy line.
- The Batman (2004) incarnation of the Penguin received a figure in the series' tie-in toy line.
- Several incarnations of the Penguin received several plush dolls and vinyl figures from Funko.
- The Batman Returns incarnation of the Penguin served as inspiration for Madame Alexander's DC Fashion Squad line.
- The Batman Returns incarnation of the Penguin received a 6-inch action figure as part of Mattel's DC Multiverse Signature Collection.
