= Lego Monster Fighters =

Lego theme

- Subject: Monsters, Ghosts, Vampires, and Zombies
- Availability: 22 May 2012–31 December 2014
- Total sets: 13 (or 14)
- Characters: Dr. Rodney Rathbone, Frank Rock, Ann Lee, Major Quinton Steele and Jack McHammer
- Official website

Lego Monster Fighters is a discontinued Lego theme from the horror fiction genre. The Monster Fighters fight against the Lord Vampyre's monsters while collecting the moonstones. The story takes place in the Monster Realm. The theme was first introduced in May 2012. It was eventually discontinued by the end of December 2014. The theme also produced a range of associated media, including theme park attractions, several shorts, video game, app and publications.

== Overview ==
The product line focuses on the Dr. Rodney Rathbone finds out that Lord Vampyre, the ruler of the Monster Realm, wants to turn day into night forever and unleash his army of monsters into the world of mortal minifigures. To accomplish his plan, Lord Vampyre must gather six magic moonstones and use them in a machine of his own creation, which can direct the magic of the gems and begin an eternal eclipse of the Sun. He and his team of Monster Fighters embark on a mission to prevent the monsters from completing their evil plot.

In October 2012, The Lego Group build a 10-foot model of Lord Vampyre near Jackson Square and St. Louis Cathedral in New Orleans.

== Development ==
In 2017, The Lego Group Vice President of Design Matthew Ashton discussed the concept of the Lego Monster Fighters theme and explained, "Younger kids look up to older kids and want to be part of what they are engaging in," and continued, "We have dabbled with a few monster-based products in the past, but we really wanted to dedicate a whole line to this theme so kids could play out multiple adventures with a deeper story." The Lego Group found that Lego Monster Fighters and its characters were quite similar to the instantly recognizable Universal Studios Monsters from classic cinematic horrors, which appealed to both kids and adults alike.

== Characters ==
=== Monster Fighters ===
- Dr. Rodney Rathbone: The leader of the Monster Fighters, an aristocrat from London, explorer and the great-great-great-grandfig of the first minifigure to ever walk into the Monster Realm. Has a prosthetic leg.
- Major Quinton Steele: An old-fashioned hunter for exotic prey who uses valuable rare weapons such as a blunderbuss. He was born in Safaraway, Africa. First met Dr. Rodney Rathbone when he was searching for a new hunting challenge. Has a prosthetic telescopic eye.
- Frank Rock (Franklin Rhodes): A motorcyclist rebel who wanted to find his missing dog that he believed to be abducted by swamp ghouls. He wears a mirror sunglasses.
- Jack McHammer: A burly lumberjack from Scotland or Canada, he never leaves home without his hammer. He has a prosthetic arm because his own one was cut off by the Crazy Scientist who needed parts for creating a monster.
- Ann Lee: A brave pilot, proficient in the art of broomstickajitzu and archery, who uses ammo as accessories and household items as weapons. She has a scar from the Witch Nail on the left side of her face.

=== Monsters ===
- Lord Vampyre: A vampire who is the ruler of the Monster Realm. He planned to present the precious moonstone to his wife, but discovered its magical powers and decided to keep the gem for himself. Lord Vampyre built a machine which can create an eclipse using the power of six of the moonstones and turn day into night forever, so monsters could roam freely. Like regular vampires, he sleeps during the day in a coffin or upside down, can transform into a bat, and fears sunlight and garlic. He likes to play the organ for his wife. His red moonstone gives power to control minions. He made a cameo in The Lego Batman Movie film as an inmate of the Phantom Zone. On the preliminary box art, his name was Dracula as he is based on Count Dracula.
- Vampyre's bride: A master of hexes and poisons who is Lord Vampyre's wife. She wanted to get a gem from her husband. But after Lord Vampyre acquired it, he became more inattentive to her remorse. She is based on the Brides of Dracula.
- The Swamp Creature: A fig-fish with gills, scales, fins, and hypnotic gaze who is a strong swimmer. He inhabits swamps of the Monster Realm. His yellowy-green moonstone gives power to control water.
- The Mummy: An ancient mummy who roams desert roads of the Monster Realm at night on his chariot with fire-eyed skeleton horse. He searches for anyone to take revenge on. Possesses super strength and ancient magic. The Mummy's purple moonstone gives power to magnify the curses.
- The Werewolf: A hairy camper and fan of the band Grateful Undead by day and a werewolf from Drachwald Forest by night. He likes outdoor concerts and playing fetch or frisbee. His orange moonstone gives superhuman strength and speed.
- The Crazy Scientist: A mad scientist who cut off Jack McHammer's arm and used it in making the Monster in his underground laboratory. He is in possession of the green moonstone, which gives him power to create life through the lightning and enormous strength to his Monster. The Crazy Scientist is a parody of Victor Frankenstein.
- The Crazy Scientist's Monster: The creation of the Crazy Scientist, made from the bricks of minifigures and high-voltage electricity. Though he possesses super-human strength, he's not too smart and is easily puzzled or distracted. He is a parody of Frankenstein's monster.
- The Manbats: Two man-sized humanoid vampire bats who protect the castle of Lord Vampyre where he built his eclipse machine.
- The Ghosts: Three ghosts who inhabit the Moor of Woe and Wailing and the Haunted House. They like shopping at Boobash and Beyond store. They do not like bright light. Their blue moonstone gives power to pass through solid objects. It is kept in the Ghost Train which the ghosts guard.
- The Zombies: Different zombies living in the Monster Realm. The Zombies' pink moonstone gives power to re-create life. Among them are:
  - The Zombie Butler: The Zombie Butler is a Frankenstein's monster-like creature that works as Lord Vampyre's butler. He has previously been fired from the previous haunted house gigs for his clumsiness. The Zombie Butler is a parody of Lurch.
  - The Zombie Bride and Groom: The Zombie Bride and Groom are always together. They live in the Monster Realm graveyard where they were brought back to life by the Voodoo Doctor.
  - The Zombie Chef: The Zombie Chef is a chef that works in Lord Vampyre's haunted house.
  - The Zombie Driver: The Zombie Driver works as a valet and chauffeur for Lord Vampyre, he is loyal and hard-working servant who is known to do as his master wishes, putting himself in the most perilous of situations, doing the most horrible jobs, and protecting the Vampyre family.

== Construction sets ==
According to BrickLink, The Lego Group released 13 playsets with some promotional polybags as part of the Lego Monster Fighters theme. The product line was eventually discontinued by the end of December 2014.

In 2012, The Lego Group announced that the seven sets was released on 22 May 2012. The seven sets were The Swamp Creature (set number: 9461), The Mummy (set number: 9462), The Werewolf (set number: 9463), The Vampyre Hearse (set number: 9464), The Crazy Scientist & His Monster (set number: 9466), The Ghost Train (set number: 9467) and Vampyre Castle (set number: 9468). Later, The Zombies (set number: 9465) was released on 23 July 2012. Another set, namely Haunted House (set number: 10228) was released on 4 September 2012. In addition, four polybag sets were released as promotions, which were Zombie Chauffeur Coffin Car (set number: 30200), Ghost (set number: 30201), Zombie Car (set number: 40076) and Monster Fighter promotional pack (set number: 5000644). These included three key chains with a key chain attached to the minifigures of Lord Vampyre, Ghost and The Monster. The two giant minifigure Lego Alarm Clocks of Zombie and Lord Vampyre was released October 2012. The sets were designed primarily for children aged 7–14.

=== The Swamp Creature ===
The Swamp Creature (set number: 9461) was released on 22 May 2012. The set consists of 70 pieces with 2 minifigures. The set included Lego minifigures of Frank Rock and Swamp Creature with green moonstone. It also included small speed boat for Frank Rock with some guns and missiles, as well as a small seaweed area in the swamp for the yellowy-green Moonstone.

=== The Mummy ===
The Mummy (set number: 9462) was released on 22 May 2012. The set consists of 90 pieces with 2 minifigures. The set included Lego minifigures of Ann Lee and Mummy with purple moonstone. It had a small helicopter for Ann Lee, and also, the Mummy's chariot with a glow in the Dark Skeleton Ghost Horse.

=== The Werewolf ===
The Werewolf (set number: 9463) was released on 22 May 2012. The set consists of 243 pieces with 2 minifigures. The set included Lego minifigures of Major Quinton Steele and Werewolf with orange moonstone. It also included a small vehicle for Quinton and a large tree, which could launch the werewolf as a play feature.

=== The Vampyre Hearse ===
The Vampyre Hearse (set number: 9464) was released on 22 May 2012. The set consists of 314 pieces with 3 minifigures. The set included Lego minifigures of Dr. Rodney Rathbone, Vampyre with red moonstone and the Zombie Driver. The hearse could lift the coffin as a play feature.

=== The Zombies ===
The Zombies (set number: 9465) was released on 23 July 2012. The set consists of 447 pieces with 4 minifigures. The set included Lego minifigures of Jack McHammer, Zombie Bride, Zombie Driver and Zombie Groom. Jack's large truck could smash the zombies with heavy hammers, and shoot missiles. The mausoleum could rotate the pink zombie moonstone to awaken the zombies and shoot a boiling bowl of bones.

=== The Crazy Scientist & His Monster ===
The Crazy Scientist & His Monster (set number: 9466) was released on 22 May 2012. The set consists of 422 pieces with 4 minifigures. The set included Lego minifigures of Rodney Rathbone, Quinton Steele, the Crazy Scientist with green moonstone and Monster. It included the lab of the scientist with jail cell, monster spot with moonstone play feature, and glow in the dark parts.

=== The Ghost Train ===
The Ghost Train (set number: 9467) was released on 22 May 2012. The set consists of 740 pieces with 5 minifigures. The set included Lego minifigures of Frank Rock, Ann Lee and 3 ghosts with blue moonstone. It included a plane with missiles and a massive ghost train with jail, machine, small cars, and tons of glow in the dark parts.

=== Vampyre Castle ===
Vampyre Castle (set number: 9468) was released on 22 May 2012. The (second) biggest set consists of 949 pieces with 7 minifigures. It included Lego minifigures of Lord Vampyre, Vampyre's Bride, 2 Manbats, Dr. Rodney Rathbone, Jack McHammer, and a Skeleton. The set also had all the moonstones except for the Zombie one. It has the second most parts, but it's bigger than the Haunted House (and most Modular Buildings). The set includes a car with a net launcher and a massive castle which measures over 18" (45 cm) high, 11" (28 cm) wide and 10" (26 cm) deep. The castle included a gate with spikes, shooting spider, glow in the dark parts, jail cell, skeleton, trap door, shooting rock and exit for the jail, stairs, map, living quarters, spots for the man-bats, moonstone device, piano, treasure, wall that turns into spinning stairs, coffin, spike pit, bowl with elements and very large walls with 4 towers. 3 small decoration towers also exist above the gate and next to the tallest of them all. The castle also features curtains and a room for the coffin of Lord Vampyre. It also has many play features like spikes in the gate, shooting glow in the dark spider, shooting rock in the jail cell and a pit with spikes and a trap door in the right tower, as traps. Other play features include a wall that turns into a staircase (as mentioned above), the Moonstone device in the tallest tower and torturing the dead skeleton in the jail cell.

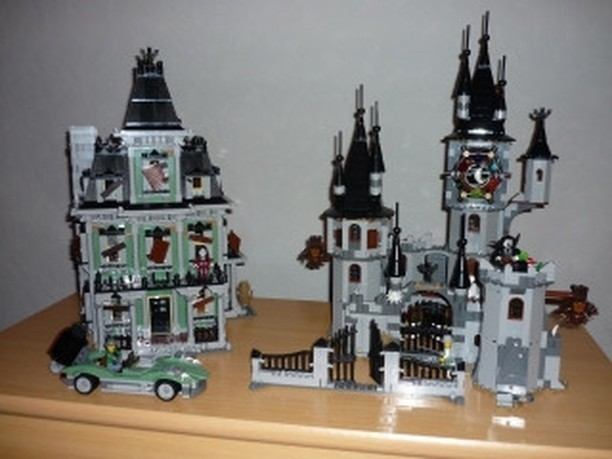
Haunted House and Vampyre Castle. Τhe first could be the Phantom Manor and maybe the castle is based on the Newbury Town Hall, where the Monster realm of Monster Fighters is located, according to Lego employee Adam White.

=== Haunted House ===
Haunted House (set number: 10228) was released on 4 September 2012. This set (the largest in the series) consists of 2064 pieces with 6 minifigures. The set included Lego minifigures of 2 ghosts, Lord Vampyre, Vampyre's Bride, Zombie chef and Zombie butler. Although more parts, not as big as the Vampyre Castle in dimensions. It's also probably similar to the Phantom Manor (Disneyland Paris's version of The Haunted Mansion). It has a gate, and the big mansion which measures 15.4" (39 cm) high, 9.4" (24 cm) wide and 7.5" (19 cm) deep. The first and second floor are the kitchen, an empty living room (possibly previous furniture was removed due to hauntings), writing area, and a bedroom with paintings, lamps and a skull of a deer on the walls, a human heart and a closet. The kitchen had ovens, stoves, and a very large table with bottles, jars and a large bowl cooking a snake. Also had a large grey old spider web, maybe there was a refrigerator where the spider web is. The third floor was the attic, which included many details like knight's helmet, gun, chest with top hat, music player, CDs, newspapers and more bottles and jars. Also included a crate for the cds and newspapers and a staircase leading from the second floor to the attic. The set also included a small gate as a sub-build. Also even though it's a little bit smaller than Vampyre Castle, its box is larger because of the higher piece count.

== Web shorts ==
The product line was accompanied by a series of animated short films that was released on YouTube.

#	Title	Release date	Notes
1	Quest for the Moonstones Part 1	October 30, 2012	LEGO Monster Fighters stop motion series.
2	Quest for the Moonstones Part 2	October 30, 2012	LEGO Monster Fighters stop motion series.
3	There's Monsters In the Room	October 30, 2012	LEGO Monster Fighters stop motion series.
4	Monster Fighters Tryouts	October 30, 2012	LEGO Monster Fighters stop motion series.
5	Villainy or Just Plain Viral	October 30, 2012	LEGO Monster Fighters stop motion series.
6	A Place to Call His Own	October 30, 2012	LEGO Monster Fighters stop motion series.
7	Ghost Mischief	October 30, 2012	LEGO Monster Fighters stop motion series.
8	Flashlights & Shaky Cameras	October 30, 2012	LEGO Monster Fighters stop motion series.

== Video game and app ==
=== Lego Monster Fighters Race ===
An app titled Lego Monster Fighters Race was developed by The Lego Group for iPad, iPhone and iPod Touch and released on 30 September 2012. It includes the Monster Fighters and Lord Vampyre's monsters as playable characters.

=== Lego Worlds ===
The crossover Lego-themed sandbox game Lego Worlds developed by Traveller's Tales and published by Warner Bros. Interactive Entertainment. Lego Worlds was released on 7 March 2017 for Microsoft Windows, PlayStation 4 and Xbox One. A version for Nintendo Switch was released on 5 September 2017 in North America and 8 September 2017 in Europe. It includes the Monster Fighters and Lord Vampyre's monsters as playable characters.

== Theme park attractions ==
In 2014, Ghost - The Haunted House was introduced to Legoland Billund. The attraction was located in the area between the Heartlake Express railway track and the footpath from the Coastguard HQ to Atlantis - Submarine Voyage.

In 2019, Haunted House Monster Party was launched at Legoland Windsor Resort on 13 April 2019. The attraction was located in Adventure Land along the path between Lego City and Atlantis Submarine Voyage. In addition, a huge haunted building based on Haunted House (set number: 10228) included oversized recreations of spider webs, wooden tiles, balloons and more adorning the outside. All around the exterior, fantastically frightful large scale brick built animals and monsters including a giant gargoyle and spider add to the supernatural setting.

== Publications ==
In August 2012, two books based on the Lego Monster Fighters theme were released. Lego Monster Fighters: Watch Out, Monsters About! and Lego Monster Fighters: Meet the Monsters were released on 20 August 2012 by DK.

== Reception ==
In July 2012, The Ghost Train (set number: 9467) was listed as one of the Top Ten Toys for Christmas 2012 by the Argos. In September 2012, Lego Monster Fighters theme was listed as one of the Top 10 toys list by John Lewis. In November 2012, Vampyre Castle (set number: 9468) was listed as one of the Top 20 Toys for Christmas by Play.com.

== Awards and nominations ==
In 2012, The Ghost Train (set number: 9467) was awarded "DreamToys" in the Construction category by the Toy Retailers Association.

== See also ==
- Lego Ghostbusters
- Lego Scooby-Doo
- The Lego Batman Movie
- Lego Stranger Things
- Lego Hidden Side
- Lego Gabby's Dollhouse
