= Lego Scooby-Doo =

Lego theme

- Subject: Scooby-Doo
- Licensed from: Warner Bros. Animation and Hanna-Barbera
- Availability: 2015–2017
- Total sets: 6 (including promotional set)
- Characters: Scooby-Doo, Shaggy Rogers, Fred Jones, Daphne Blake and Velma Dinkley
- Official website

Lego Scooby-Doo is a discontinued Lego theme based on the Scooby-Doo franchise created by Joe Ruby and Ken Spears. It is licensed from Warner Bros. Animation and Hanna-Barbera. The theme was first introduced in August 2015. The toy line was accompanied by several shorts, a television special and films based on Lego Scooby-Doo. The theme was discontinued by the end of 2017.

== Overview ==
Lego Scooby-Doo was based on the Scooby-Doo franchise. The product line focuses on Scooby-Doo and the four teenage members of Mystery, Inc. — Fred Jones, Shaggy Rogers, Daphne Blake and Velma Dinkley — arriving at a location in the Mystery Machine, a van painted with psychedelic colors and flower power imagery. Encountering a ghost, monster, or other ostensibly supernatural creature terrorizing the local populace, they decide to investigate. The kids split up to look for clues and suspects while being chased at turns by the monster. Eventually, the kids come to realize the ghost and other paranormal activity is actually an elaborate hoax, and—often with the help of a Rube Goldberg-like trap designed by Fred—they capture the villain and unmask him. Revealed as a flesh and blood crook trying to cover up crimes by using the ghost story and costume, the criminal is arrested and taken to jail, often with the catchphrase "if it weren't for those pesky kids". Lego Scooby-Doo aimed to recreate the main characters in Lego form, including Scooby-Doo, Shaggy, Fred, Daphne and Velma.

== Development ==
Lego Scooby-Doo was another license acquisition following other Lego product lines such as Lego Star Wars, Lego Super Heroes and Lego Ghostbusters. The theme aimed to bring the animated franchise to life in Lego form. Jill Wilfert, Vice President for global licensing and entertainment stated that the Scooby-Doo franchise had "global reach, great characters and stories and inherent building and role play opportunities". The deal with Warner Bros. Animation aimed to appeal to collectors and parents with strong childhood nostalgia. The deal included a toy line and a 22-minute animated special.

== Launch ==
In 2015, Lego Scooby-Doo theme was launched at the British Toy and Hobby Association Toy Fair in August 2015. As part of the marketing campaign, The Lego Group released five toy sets based on the Scooby-Doo franchise. Each set featured different haunted buildings and vehicles. Minifigures were released as well, including Scooby-Doo, Shaggy Rogers, Fred Jones, Daphne Blake and Velma Dinkley. Several villains, including Black Knight / Mr. Wickles, Mummy / Dr. Najib, Ghost / Bluestone the Great, Headless Horseman / Elwood Crane, Lighthouse Keeper / Verona Dempsey, Swamp Creature / Mr. Brown and Vampire / Big Bob Oakley to revealed the culprits in the back of its heads except the Zombie / Zeke. (Note: The Zombie is the only monster minifigure without a revealed culprit in the back of his head. The Zombie also make a cameo in Lego Scooby-Doo! Haunted Hollywood as an actor and voiced by Dee Bradley Baker.)

In addition, Lego Scooby-Doo Mystery Tour, a multi-city mall tour was launched on 19 September until 31 October 2017 to celebrate the released of Lego Scooby-Doo toy sets. It also included life-size Lego models of Scooby-Doo, Shaggy, Velma, Daphne, Fred and the Mystery Machine in each city.

== Characters ==
- Scooby-Doo: He is a male Great Dane and lifelong companion of amateur detective Shaggy Rogers, with whom he shares many personality traits. He features a mix of both canine and human behaviors (reminiscent of other talking animals in Hanna-Barbera's series), and is treated by his friends more or less as an equal. He speaks in a slurred, dog-like voice. His catchphrase is "Scooby-Dooby-Doo!". Voiced by Frank Welker.
- Shaggy Rogers: He is a cowardly slacker and the long-time best friend of his equally cowardly Great Dane, Scooby-Doo. Like Scooby-Doo, Shaggy is more interested in eating than solving mysteries. Voiced by Matthew Lillard.
- Fred Jones: He is about a quartet of teenage mystery solvers and their Great Dane companion, Scooby-Doo. Voiced by Frank Welker.
- Daphne Blake: She is depicted as coming from a wealthy family, is noted for her orange hair, lavender heels, fashion sense, and her knack for getting into danger, hence the nickname "Danger Prone Daphne". Voiced by Grey Griffin.
- Velma Dinkley: She is the brains of the team Mystery Incorporated. (Note: Velma also make a cameo in The Lego Movie 2: The Second Part and voiced by Trisha Gum.) Voiced by Kate Micucci.

== Construction sets ==
According to BrickLink, The Lego Group released a total of 5 Lego sets and promotional polybag as part of Lego Scooby-Doo theme. It was discontinued by the end of 2017.

In 2015, The Lego Group announced a partnership with Warner Bros. Consumer Products to create a licensing and merchandising programme based on Scooby-Doo franchise, which was released on 1 August 2015. The partnership included the release of the five sets based on the Scooby-Doo franchise. The five Lego sets being released were Mummy Museum Mystery (set number: 75900), Mystery Plane Adventures (set number: 75901), The Mystery Machine (set number: 75902), Haunted Lighthouse (set number: 75903) and Mystery Mansion (set number: 75904). Each of the sets featured the main characters, named Scooby-Doo, Shaggy, Fred, Daphne and Velma. The sets were designed primarily for children aged 5 to 12 years old.

In 2016, Lego Scooby-Doo! Haunted Hollywood was released on DVD and also included Lego minifigure of Scooby-Doo as a free gift on 10 May 2016.

=== Mummy Museum Mystery ===
Mummy Museum Mystery (set number: 75900) was released on 1 August 2015. The set consists of 110 pieces with 3 minifigures. Mummy Museum included an opening golden sarcophagus and variety of accessories. The set included Lego minifigures of Scooby-Doo, Shaggy and Mummy / Dr. Najib.

=== Mystery Plane Adventures ===
Mystery Plane Adventures (set number: 75901) was released on 1 August 2015. The set consists of 128 pieces with 3 minifigures. The Mystery Plane included a cockpit for Shaggy and Scooby-Doo. It also included Headless Horseman's sword, a horse and variety of accessories. The set included Lego minifigures of Scooby-Doo, Shaggy and Headless Horseman / Elwood Crane.

=== The Mystery Machine ===
The Mystery Machine (set number: 75902) was released on 1 August 2015. The set consists of 301 pieces with 4 minifigures. The Mystery Machine included a driver's cabin with steering wheel, a removable roof and 2 sits for Shaggy and Fred. The Mystery Machine can store all the variety of accessories. Spooky tree included adjustable branches and a hidden gem. The set included Lego minifigures of Fred, Shaggy, Zombie / Zeke and Scooby-Doo.

=== Haunted Lighthouse ===
Haunted Lighthouse (set number: 75903) was released on 1 August 2015. The set consists of 437 pieces with 5 minifigures. Haunted Lighthouse included a balcony, secret skull compartment and underwater rock caves, prison, kitchen with stove and pan and speedboat. The set included Lego minifigures of Shaggy, Daphne, Lighthouse Keeper / Verona Dempsey, Swamp Monster / Mr Brown and Scooby-Doo.

=== Mystery Mansion ===
Mystery Mansion (set number: 75904) was released on 1 August 2015. The largest set consists of 860 pieces with 7 minifigures. Mystery Mansion included a clock tower, a greenhouse with a man-eating plant (Venus flytrap), pumpkins, and a kitchen with variety of accessories. Motorbike included a sidecar. The set included Lego minifigures of Shaggy, Velma, Daphne, Vampire / Bob Oakley, Ghost / Bluestone the Great, Black Knight / Mr. Wickles and Scooby-Doo.

=== Scooby-Doo ===
Scooby-Doo (set number: 30601) was released on 10 May 2016 as a free gift for qualify purchase of Lego Scooby-Doo! Haunted Hollywood DVD. The polybag set consists of 2 pieces, an exclusive Scooby-Doo minifigure. The polybag set was released after the 5 main sets of 2015.

== Web shorts ==
The 16 web shorts have been released on YouTube for the Lego Scooby-Doo theme.

#	Title	Release date	Notes
1	Scooby-Doo and the Tag-Sale Clue	July 30, 2015	Lego Scooby-Doo stop motion series
2	Donuts Save the Day	August 11, 2015	Lego Scooby-Doo stop motion series
3	Doorway Debacle	August 19, 2015	Lego Scooby-Doo stop motion series
4	Ghoul on Wheels	August 26, 2015	Lego Scooby-Doo stop motion series
5	The Getaway	September 2, 2015	Lego Scooby-Doo stop motion series
6	Creaky Creep Out	September 9, 2015	Lego Scooby-Doo stop motion series
7	Impossible Imposters	September 15, 2015	Lego Scooby-Doo stop motion series
8	Trick and Treat	October 21, 2015	Lego Scooby-Doo stop motion series
9	Mystery Machine Mash-Up	March 8, 2016	Lego Scooby-Doo stop motion series
10	Lighthouse Lunch Break	March 15, 2016	Lego Scooby-Doo stop motion series
11	Scary Sleepover	March 22, 2016	Lego Scooby-Doo stop motion series
12	Nice Ride (Note: Nice Ride was first uploaded on September 18, 2015, but was quickly removed. It was put back online on March 29, 2016.)	March 29, 2016	Lego Scooby-Doo stop motion series
13	If You Build It, Pizza Will Come	April 5, 2016	Lego Scooby-Doo stop motion series
14	Mummy Museum Mystery	April 12, 2016	Lego Scooby-Doo stop motion series
15	Danger Prone Daphne	April 19, 2016	Lego Scooby-Doo stop motion series
16	Wicked Warehouse Pursuit	April 26, 2016	Lego Scooby-Doo stop motion series

== TV specials and films ==
=== Lego Scooby-Doo! Knight Time Terror (2015) ===
Lego Scooby-Doo: Knight Time Terror (also known as Scooby-Doo! Knight Time Terror) is a 2015 direct-to-video animated comedy film and television movie special in Lego animation. It is the twenty-fifth entry in the direct-to-video series of Scooby-Doo films, the first based on the Scooby-Doo brand of LEGO, and based upon the Scooby-Doo Saturday morning cartoons. It was created to promote the new Scooby-Doo Lego sets, which aired on Cartoon Network on November 25, 2015. Also made its global debut on Teletoon in Canada on October 2, 2015. The special premiered on Boomerang channels in the United Kingdom and Ireland in late October 2015 and debuted in Australia and New Zealand on January 26, 2016.

=== Lego Scooby-Doo! Haunted Hollywood (2016) ===
Lego Scooby-Doo! Haunted Hollywood is a 2016 direct-to-DVD animated comedy film. It is the twenty-sixth entry in the direct-to-video series of Scooby-Doo films, and the second based on the Scooby-Doo brand of Lego. The first trailer was released on February 23. The film was released on DVD, Blu-ray and digitally on May 10. This is the first non-TV Scooby-Doo themed production to feature Kate Micucci as the voice of Velma Dinkley, following Mindy Cohn's retirement from the role in 2015, with Micucci having assumed the role in Be Cool, Scooby-Doo! the same year.

=== Lego Scooby-Doo! Blowout Beach Bash (2017) ===
Lego Scooby-Doo! Blowout Beach Bash is a 2017 direct-to-DVD animated comedy film, and the twenty-ninth entry in the direct-to-video series of Scooby-Doo films, as well as the third in the series to be based on the Scooby-Doo brand of Lego. It was released digitally on July 11, 2017, and on DVD and Blu-ray on July 25, 2017.

== Video game and app ==
=== Lego Dimensions ===
The crossover toys-to-life game Lego Dimensions developed by Traveller's Tales features content based on the original Scooby-Doo. A "team pack" includes an additional level that recreates the events of the original film and adds Scooby-Doo and Shaggy as a playable characters.

=== Lego Scooby-Doo: Escape from Haunted Isle ===
An app titled Lego Scooby-Doo: Escape from Haunted Isle was based on Scooby-Doo!, Warner Bros. Interactive Entertainment released the side-scrolling action platformers on 3 October 2015. It was released for Android and iOS.

== Other media ==
=== Lego Ideas ===
A project based on the Mystery Machine from the Scooby-Doo franchise was uploaded to the Lego Ideas site on December 23, 2020. The project was created by Let Them Fly. The project reached 10,000 supporters in around seven months, but Lego did not approve it.

== See also ==
- Scooby-Doo (franchise)
- Lego Monster Fighters
- Lego Ghostbusters
- Lego Stranger Things
- Lego Hidden Side
- Mixels
- Lego DC Super Hero Girls
- Lego Unikitty!
- The Lego Movie 2: The Second Part
