= Lego Ghostbusters =

Lego theme

- Subject: Ghostbusters
- Licensed from: Columbia Pictures and Ghost Corps (Sony Pictures)
- Availability: 2014–2020
- Total sets: 3
- Characters: Peter Venkman, Raymond Stantz, Egon Spengler, Winston Zeddemore, Janine Melnitz, Dana Barrett, Louis Tully, Zombie Driver, Library Ghost, Slimer, Pink Ghost, Blue Ghost, Abby Yates, Erin Gilbert, Jillian Holtzmann, Patty Tolan, Kevin Beckman, Mayhem and Stay Puft
- Official website

Lego Ghostbusters is a discontinued Lego theme based on the Ghostbusters franchise created by Dan Aykroyd and Harold Ramis. It is licensed from Columbia Pictures and Ghost Corps (Sony Pictures). The Lego Ghostbusters theme was first introduced in 2014. The first set was released in June 2014 as part of the Lego Ideas theme (formerly known as Lego Cuusoo). Later, a set based on the Ghostbusters' firehouse was released and one set based on the Ghostbusters: Answer the Call. The Lego Group also used this license for character and level packs in the Lego Dimensions toys-to-life video game. In 2018, a set was released as part of the Lego BrickHeadz theme. In 2020, another set was released in November 2020 and based on Ghostbusters: Afterlife film. (Note: This film delayed to November 11, 2021, due to the impact of the COVID-19 pandemic in the film industry.)

== Overview ==
Lego Ghostbusters is based on the Ghostbusters franchise. The product line focuses on the Ghostbusters characters who start a ghost-catching business in New York City. Lego Ghostbusters aimed to recreate the main characters in Lego form, including Peter Venkman, Ray Stantz, Egon Spengler and Winston Zeddemore.

== Development ==
Lego Ghostbusters began with the release of a user-designed construction set based on the Ectomobile (or Ecto-1), the vehicle that features in the films. The design was submitted to Lego Ideas by Australian video game artist Brent Waller. The design achieved 10,000 votes, after which it was selected for production. It was chosen for having "broad worldwide appeal and the fact that the model lends itself to challenging and creative building for both children and adult fans". The set was produced to celebrate the 30th anniversary of the original 1984 film.

Lego Ghostbusters was inspired by the Ghostbusters film franchise. The Lego construction toy range is based on the film franchise and developed in collaboration with Sony Pictures Consumer Products. The construction sets were designed to recreate the story and characters of the film series in Lego form.

== Toy line ==
=== Construction sets ===
According to BrickLink, The Lego Group released a total of 3 Lego sets as part of Lego Ghostbusters theme.

The Lego Ghostbusters theme was launched at the New York Toy Fair in 2014. Following the successful campaign by Brent Waller for the Lego Cuusoo idea, The Lego Group released the first construction toy set based on the film. Ghostbusters Ecto-1 (set number: 21108) was based on the Ectomobile from the Ghostbusters franchise and was released in June 2014. The release of the set coincided with the 30th anniversary of the original 1984 Ghostbusters film on 7 June 2014. The set included Lego minifigures of Dr. Peter Venkman, Dr. Egon Spengler and Winston Zeddemore. It also included paranormal detection equipment, a removable roof and a tracking computer. The Lego Group announced the Ghostbusters Ecto-1 (set number: 21108) was retired by the end of 2016.

In 2016, Firehouse Headquarters (set number: 75827) a second set based on the Ghostbusters' firehouse was released in January 2016. Firehouse Headquarters (set number: 75827) was the largest set. The set contained 4634 pieces with nine minifigures and was recommended for builders with an age rating of 16+. The Firehouse Headquarters had nine rooms including a laboratory, containment unit, darkroom, garage bay, office area, kitchen, sleeping quarters, bathroom and recreation room. The set featured opening walls for easy play access. The doors of the Firehouse Headquarters could open to fit the Ghostbusters Ecto-1(set number: 21108) inside. The set included three ghost figures of Slimer, Pink Ghost and Blue Ghost. The Lego Group announced the Firehouse Headquarters (set number: 75827) was retired by the end of 2018.

Later, Ecto-1 & 2 (set number: 75828) based on Ghostbusters: Answer the Call film was released in July 2016. Ecto-1 & 2 (set number: 75828) was the third set. The set featured the Ecto-1 vehicle, Ecto-2 motorbike and five minifigures with a ghost figure. The set contained 556 pieces and was recommended for builders with an age rating of 8–14. The set included Lego minifigures of Abby Yates, Erin Gilbert, Jillian Holtzmann, Patty Tolan, Kevin and along with Mayhem ghost figure. It also included removable roof with paranormal detection equipment, 4 proton packs, proton sidearm, an ion shield gun, PKE Meter, 2 traps and a toolbox. The Lego Group announced the Ecto-1 & 2 (set number: 75828) was retired by the end of 2017.

In 2020, it was announced that the ECTO-1 (set number: 10274) based on the Ghostbusters: Afterlife film was released on 15 November 2020. The set contains 2352 pieces and is recommended for builders with an age rating of 18+. It also included working steering, trapdoor with ghost trap, an extending gunner seat, a moving ghost sniffer and paranormal detection equipment. In addition, a Ghostbusters Afterlife poster was included as a free gift. Lego designer Michael Psiaki explained, "I love creating LEGO vehicles, and having previously designed the LEGO James Bond Aston Martin DB5, I loved the challenge of working on the ECTO-1. This is the largest and most detailed version of this car that we have ever created. It is crammed full of authentic features and easter eggs that I'm excited for builders to discover as they put this model together."

=== Lego BrickHeadz sets ===
Peter Venkman & Slimer (set number: 41622) was released on 1 July 2018 as part of the Lego BrickHeadz theme and based on the original 1984 Ghostbusters film. The set consists of 228 pieces and 2 baseplates. The set included Peter Venkman's Proton pack and Slimer's hot dogs.

== Video games ==
=== Lego Dimensions ===
The crossover toys-to-life game Lego Dimensions (2015) developed by Traveller's Tales features content based on both the original Ghostbusters and its 2016 remake. A "level pack" includes an additional level that recreates the events of the original film and adds Peter Venkman (Note: Upon completing the included level, players can use the Peter Venkman figure to also control the other three Ghostbusters (Ray Stantz, Egon Spengler, and Winston Zeddemore) in the game.) as a playable character, with the unlockable ability to play as the other three Ghostbusters. A "story pack" offers an extended six-level story campaign retelling the events of the 2016 film, and includes a playable Abby Yates, (Note: Upon completing the included levels, players can use the Abby Yates figure to also control the other three Ghostbusters (Erin Gilbert, Jillian Holtzmann and Patty Tolan) in the game.) who can also be used to play as the other three Ghostbusters. Additional "fun packs" add Slimer and Stay Puft as playable characters.

=== Lego Legacy: Heroes Unboxed ===
The crossover online game Lego Legacy: Heroes Unboxed (2020), developed by Gameloft and released exclusively for Microsoft Windows, Android and iOS devices on 27 February 2020, includes Peter Venkman, Ray Stanz, Egon Spengler, Winston Zeddemore and Slimer as playable characters. They are the first licensed characters in the game.

== Reception ==
The Ghostbusters Ecto-1 (set number: 10274) was well received by David Cartlidge for Blocks magazine, who rated it 95/100 and opined that, "the finished vehicle is a perfect rendition of the source material and the complex curves, lines and fins of this classic vehicle are recreated masterfully."

== See also ==
- Lego BrickHeadz
- Lego Monster Fighters
- Lego Scooby-Doo
- Lego Stranger Things
- Lego Hidden Side
