= Lego Stranger Things =

Lego theme

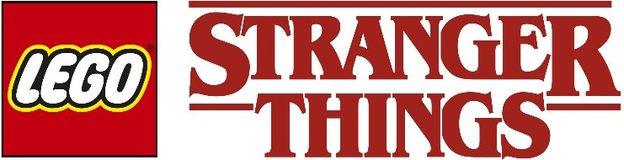
- Subject: Stranger Things
- Licensed from: Netflix
- Availability: 2019–present
- Total sets: 2
- Characters: Barbara "Barb" Holland, Eleven / Jane Hopper, Mike Wheeler, Lucas Sinclair, Dustin Henderson, Will Byers, Joyce Byers, Chief Jim Hopper and the Demogorgon
- Official website

Lego Stranger Things is a Lego theme based on the Netflix sci-fi horror series of the same name created by the Duffer Brothers. It is licensed from Netflix. The theme was first introduced in May 2019 with the latest set released in January 2026.

== Overview ==
Lego Stranger Things was based on the Stranger Things 2016 Netflix sci-fi horror series, which focuses on the investigation into the disappearance of a young boy (Will Byers) amid supernatural events occurring around the town, including the appearance of a girl with psychokinetic abilities (Eleven). Lego Stranger Things aimed to recreate the main characters in Lego form, including Barbara "Barb" Holland, Eleven / Jane Hopper, Mike Wheeler, Lucas Sinclair, Dustin Henderson, Will Byers, Joyce Byers, Chief Jim Hopper, and the Demogorgon.

== Development ==
Lego senior model designer Justin Ramsden worked closely with Netflix to design The Upside Down set: "they gave us loads of behind the scenes images and plans." He said, "We also got the chance to create three new elements for the set as well, they are headgear for the Demogorgon, a hair piece for Dustin and also the hair for Will." He further explained, "With the Stranger Things set, we started off with a concept sketch. There was an elite team of LEGO designers that joined together to discuss what this model could be. From those meetings, one of the concept designers drew a quick sketch, and that became the basis for what the model could look like. We followed the sketch and had a close dialogue with Netflix. There was some back and forth with them, and we did iterations that made the set more stable, more playable, and with more functions."

== Launch ==
In 2019, Lego Stranger Things theme was launched at The LEGO Store in Flatiron District, New York. Later, it also launched in the UK at Lego Store Leicester Square, London. As part of the marketing campaign, The Lego Group released The Upside Down (set number: 75810) based on a version of the Byers' home.

== Characters ==
- Eleven / Jane Hopper: A young girl with telepathic and psychokinetic abilities and a limited vocabulary. Her real name is Jane, and she is the biological daughter of Terry Ives.
- Mike Wheeler: A middle child of Karen and Ted Wheeler, brother of Nancy and Holly, and one of three friends of Will Byers. He is an intelligent and conscientious student and is committed to his friends. He develops romantic feelings for Eleven.
- Lucas Sinclair: One of Will's friends. He is wary of Eleven but later becomes friends with her.
- Dustin Henderson: One of Will Byers' friends. His cleidocranial dysplasia causes him to lisp.
- Will Byers: The son of Joyce Byers and younger brother of Jonathan Byers. He is captured by a monster from the "Upside Down", an alternate dimension discovered by Hawkins Laboratory scientists.
- Joyce Byers: The mother of Will and Jonathan Byers. She is divorced from Lonnie Byers.
- Chief Jim Hopper: Chief of Hawkins Police Department. After his young daughter Sara died of cancer, Hopper divorced and lapsed into alcoholism. Eventually, he grows to be more responsible, saving Joyce's son and taking Eleven as his adopted daughter. It is revealed that he and Joyce have feelings for each other.
- Barbara "Barb" Holland: An introvert and best friend of Nancy Wheeler. She is concerned that her friendship with Nancy may be threatened by Nancy's relationship with Steve. Barb is one of the first victims of the Demogorgon.
- Demogorgon: Predatory creatures from the Upside Down that serve as the Mind Flayer's initial invasion force, murderous and violent with limited intelligence. Demogorgons start off as slug-like creatures that are incubated in a victim's body, growing into a tadpole-like creature and gradually molting into an adolescent form called a "Demodog" before fully maturing.

== Toy line ==
=== Construction sets ===
According to BrickLink, The Lego Group released two Lego sets as part of the Lego Stranger Things theme. The product line was eventually discontinued by the end of December 2022.

In 2019, The Lego Group had a partnership with Netflix. The Lego Group introduced a Stranger Things set called The Upside Down (set number: 75810), based on a version of the Byers' home, and its replica of the Upside Down was released in May 2019. The most extensive set consists of 2287 pieces with 8 minifigures. The Byers' house had four rooms: a front porch with furniture, a living room, a dining room, and Will's bedroom. It also included Chief Jim Hopper's police truck and a variety of accessories. The set included Lego minifigures of Eleven, Mike Wheeler, Lucas Sinclair, Dustin Henderson, Will Byers, Joyce Byers, Chief Jim Hopper, and the Demogorgon. The sets were designed primarily for adults with an age rating of 16+ or above. The set was designed by Lego Senior Model Designer Justin Ramsden. In 2021, The Lego Group announced The Upside Down (set number: 75810) was retired on 31 December 2021.

In July 2019, San Diego Comic-Con announced that an exclusive Barb minifigure would be given away to the winners.

In February 2022, a Demogorgon minifigure Keyring was released and was retired in August 2022.

On January 1st, 2026, Lego released a new Stranger Things set called The Creel House (set number 11370) which contains 2593 pieces and represents the family house of Henry Creel, aka Vecna in the Netflix series. 13 exclusive minifigures are included in the set: Vecna, Eleven, Max, Mike, Lucas, Will, Dustin, Robin, Steve, Jonathan, Nancy, Holly and Mr. Whatsit, along with two vehicles: Steve Harrington's BMW and the WSQK radio van. The house itself is articulated and can be transformed using a hidden mechanism that splits the build to reveal Vecna's interdimensional mind world. On the first days of release, Lego did offer a gift with purchase for customers buying the Creel House. This GWP, called WSQK Radio Station, recreates the interior of the radio station featuring a DJ booth with a mixer board, tape machine, record player and microphone, plus a laid-back lounge space with a couch and TV. Two extra minifigures were included: Joyce Byers and Jim Hopper.

=== Lego BrickHeadz sets ===
On 1 February 2022, a set named Demogorgon and Eleven (set number: 40549) was released as part of the Lego BrickHeadz theme. The set consists of 192 pieces and 2 baseplates. The set was retired in December 2022.

Two more sets of 4 BrickHeadz characters were released in the Stranger Things theme: set 40801 (542 pieces, released in November 2025) contains Mike, Dustin, Lucas and Will while set 40879 (584 pieces, released in January 2026) contains Eleven, Max, Holly and a Demogorgon.

== Web shorts ==
The product line was accompanied by a series of animated short films released on YouTube.

- Welcome to The Upside Down was an official web short was released on YouTube on 15 May 2019 that inspired by both The Upside Down (set number: 75810) as well as the Stranger Things 2016 Netflix sci-fi horror series.
- The Upside Down 75810 Collector's Item was an official web short was released on YouTube on 1 June 2019 that inspired by both The Upside Down (set number: 75810) as well as the Stranger Things 2016 Netflix sci-fi horror series. It features Lucas Sinclair, Dustin Henderson, Mike Wheeler, Eleven, Joyce Byers and Chief Hopper are ready to banish the Demogorgon from the Byers' home.

== Awards and nominations ==
In 2020, The Upside Down (set number: 75810) was awarded "Toy of the Year" and also "Specialty Toy of the Year" by the Toy Association.

== See also ==
- Lego Monster Fighters
- Lego Ghostbusters
- Lego Scooby-Doo
- Lego Hidden Side
- Lego BrickHeadz
