= John Venzon =

American film editor

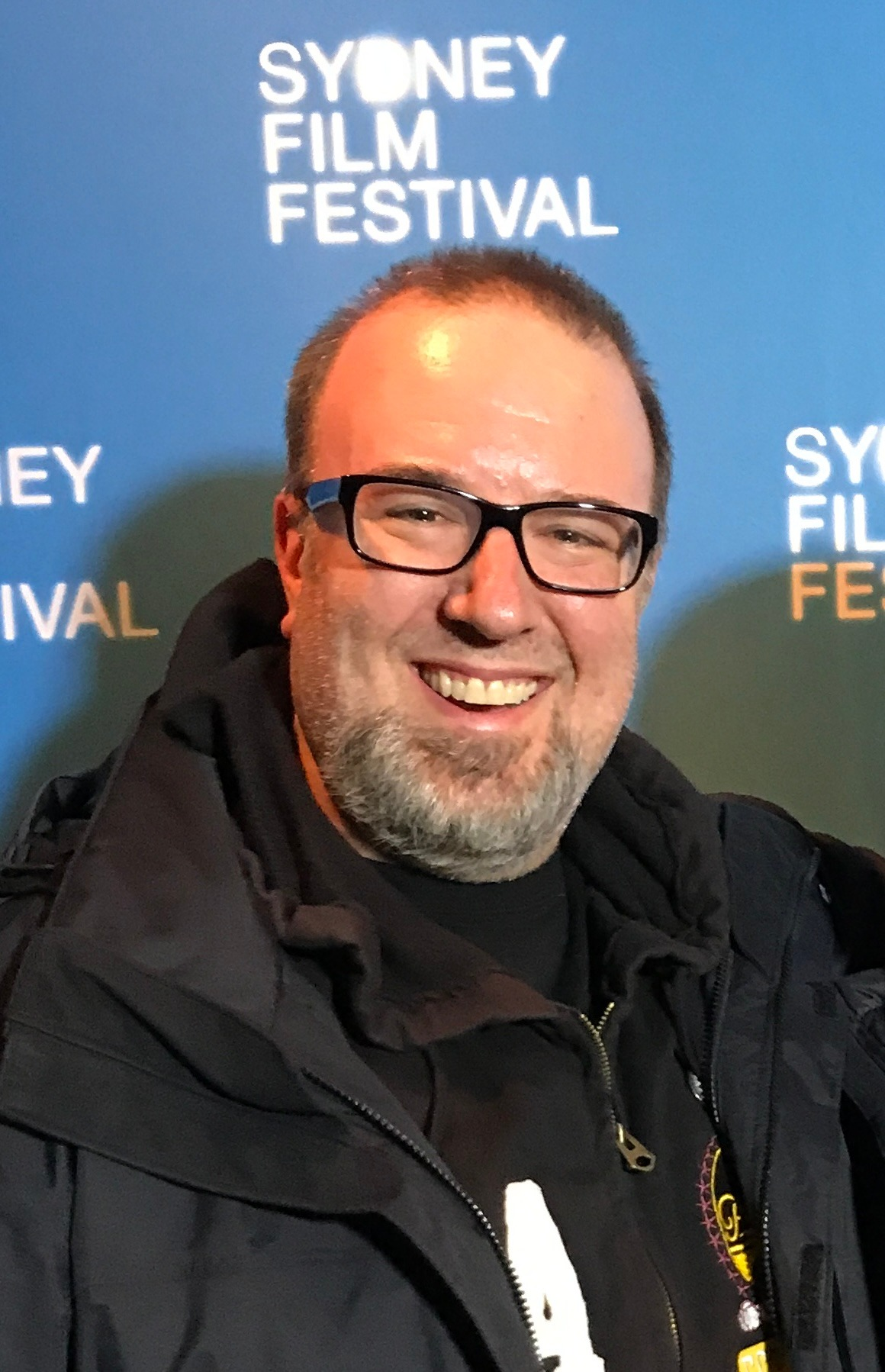
- Venzon in 2017
- Born: U.S.
- Occupation: Film editor
- Years active: 1992–present

John Venzon, ACE, is an American film editor. He is known for his work on The Bad Guys, The Lego Batman Movie, Storks, Flushed Away, and South Park: Bigger, Longer & Uncut.

== Career ==
Venzon graduated with a BFA in film studies from the University of Colorado Boulder. He is a member of American Cinema Editors (ACE), and the Academy of Motion Picture Arts and Sciences.

== Filmography ==
Year	Title	Contribution	Note
1992	Double Obsession	Editor	Feature film
1996	Almost Blue	Editor	Feature film
1999	South Park: Bigger, Longer & Uncut	Editor	Animated feature film
2004	Shark Tale	Editor	Animated feature film
2006	Flushed Away	Editor	Animated feature film
2008	Kung Fu Panda: Secrets of the Furious Five	Editor	Animated short film
2010	Astro Boy vs. The Junkyard Pirates	Editor	Video short
2010	The RRF in New Recruit	Editor	Video short
2016	Storks	Editor	Animated feature film
2017	The Lego Ninjago Movie	Editor	Animated feature film
2017	The Lego Batman Movie	Editor, voice of Penguin	Animated feature film
2022	The Bad Guys	Editor	Animated feature film
2025	Dog Man	Additional editor	Animated feature film

== Awards and nominations ==
Year	Result	Award	Category	Work	Ref.
2017	Nominated	American Cinema Editors	Best Edited Animated Feature Film	The Lego Batman Movie	
2017	Nominated	Annie Awards	Outstanding Achievement for Editorial in a Feature Production	The Lego Batman Movie	
