= The Lego Batman Movie =

2017 film by Chris McKay

- Theatrical release poster
- Directed by: Chris McKay
- Screenplay by: Seth Grahame-Smith; Chris McKenna; Erik Sommers; Jared Stern; John Whittington
- Story by: Seth Grahame-Smith
- Based on: Lego Construction Toys; Characters from DC
- Produced by: Dan Lin; Phil Lord Christopher Miller; Roy Lee
- Starring: Will Arnett; Zach Galifianakis; Michael Cera; Rosario Dawson; Ralph Fiennes
- Edited by: David Burrows; Matt Villa; John Venzon
- Music by: Lorne Balfe
- Production companies: Warner Animation Group; DC Entertainment; RatPac Entertainment; Lin Pictures; Lord Miller Productions; Vertigo Entertainment; The Lego Group
- Distributed by: Warner Bros. Pictures
- Release dates: January 29, 2017 (Dublin); February 9, 2017 (Denmark); February 10, 2017 (United States); March 30, 2017 (Australia)
- Running time: 104 minutes
- Countries: United States; Australia; Denmark
- Language: English
- Budget: $80 million
- Box office: $312 million

The Lego Batman Movie is a 2017 animated superhero comedy film based on characters created by DC Comics and the Lego Batman toy line. It was directed by Chris McKay from a screenplay that is based on a Seth Grahame-Smith story. The film is a collaboration between production houses from the United States, Australia and Denmark, the first spin-off in The Lego Movie franchise and the second installment overall. The film features Will Arnett reprising his role as Batman from The Lego Movie alongside Zach Galifianakis, Michael Cera, Rosario Dawson and Ralph Fiennes. The story follows Batman as he attempts to overcome his greatest fear while saving Gotham City from the Joker's latest scheme.

Development of The Lego Batman Movie started in October 2014, after Warner Bros. announced several Lego films, following the critical and commercial success of The Lego Movie. Chris McKay was hired to direct after being replaced by Rob Schrab as director of the sequel to The Lego Movie, who then cited both The Naked Gun and Airplane! film series as his main inspirations while casting calls began in July to November 2015. The film pays homage to previous Batman media and additionally features characters from other notable franchises and film series with them. Like The Lego Movie, the animation was provided by Animal Logic, while Lorne Balfe composed the musical score.

The Lego Batman Movie had its world premiere in Dublin, Ireland on January 29, 2017 and was released by Warner Bros. Pictures in U.S. theaters on February 10. The film received positive reviews from critics for its animation, voice acting, music, visual style and humor and was also commercially successful, having grossed $312 million worldwide against a budget of $80 million. The film later gained a cult following over the years and is widely considered to be one of the best Batman adaptations. A sequel, Lego Superfriends, was announced in 2018, but was cancelled after Universal Pictures acquired the film rights to the Lego brand in 2020.

== Plot ==
Within the DC-centric portion of the Lego universe, Batman protects Gotham City and fights crime. During his latest mission to stop the Joker and his cronies from destroying the city, Batman succeeds, but additionally hurts Joker's feelings when he deems him a perfunctory presence in his life, leading the villain to develop a plot for revenge.

The following day, Bruce Wayne attends a gala celebrating both the retirement of Commissioner Gordon and the ascension of his daughter, Barbara Gordon, to replace him. While smitten by Barbara, Bruce absent-mindedly agrees to adopt enthusiastic orphan Dick Grayson. He is then infuriated by Barbara's plans to restructure the police to function without Batman. Joker crashes the party with his cronies, but with the exception of Harley Quinn, they abruptly surrender to the police. With so many villains incarcerated, Batman becomes despondent as Gotham no longer requires his crime-fighting skills.

Believing Joker is up to something, Batman plans to steal Superman's Phantom Zone projector, a device that can banish anyone to the Phantom Zone, which houses some of the most dangerous villains in the Lego universe, only for Alfred Pennyworth to intervene and advise him to care for Dick. Batman initially refuses, so Alfred allows Dick to enter the Batcave. Appearing as Batman before Dick, Bruce states that he is additionally adopting him and christens him as Robin. Batman and Robin recover the projector from the Atomic Cauldron in the Fortress of Solitude, break into Arkham Asylum and successfully send Joker to the Phantom Zone. Suspecting that Joker wanted to be sent there, Barbara detains the duo.

While the projector is being seized as evidence, Harley steals it back as part of Joker's plan and frees him, allowing him to return to Gotham with all the villains he had recruited in the Phantom Zone as they ravage the city and conquer Wayne Manor. Realizing that Gotham does need Batman after all, Barbara releases him and Robin and teams up with them and Alfred to stop the new threat. Although his teammates achieve some success in fighting the villains, Batman forcibly sends them away and confronts Joker alone, fearing that he might lose them just like his parents.

Believing that Batman is incapable of changing his ways, Joker sends him to the Phantom Zone before stealing the Batcave's stash of confiscated bombs to destroy Gotham. Meanwhile, Phyllis, the Phantom Zone's prison warden, shows Batman his constant mistreatment of those closest to him; he finally accepts his greatest fear of being part of a family and vows to better himself. Batman's teammates return to the fight to help him, but are endangered themselves. Batman makes a deal with Phyllis to temporarily return to Gotham to retrieve the Zone's escaped villains and arrives in time to save his teammates, apologizing to them for leaving them and requesting their help to defeat Joker. They agree, with Barbara taking on the mantle of Batgirl.

With help from Joker's former team, Batman and his team defeat the escaped villains and send them back to the Phantom Zone. Unfortunately, Joker's bombs detonate, causing the plates below Gotham to divide in half and tear apart. Batman convinces Joker to help him by telling him he gives him purpose to be the hero he is. With the help of every civilian and villain, they manage to save Gotham, chain-linking themselves to reattach the plates.

Batman reveals to Robin that he is Bruce, then goes to return to the Phantom Zone to face the consequences of his earlier behavior. However, Phyllis allows him to stay after realizing he is a hero and seeing how he changed to save everyone. Afterward, Batman gives their adversaries a head start, knowing they will be no match for his team.

== Voice cast ==
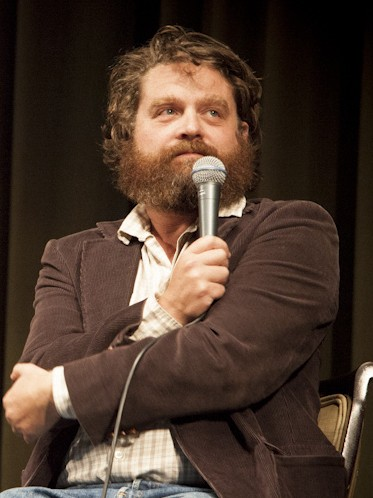
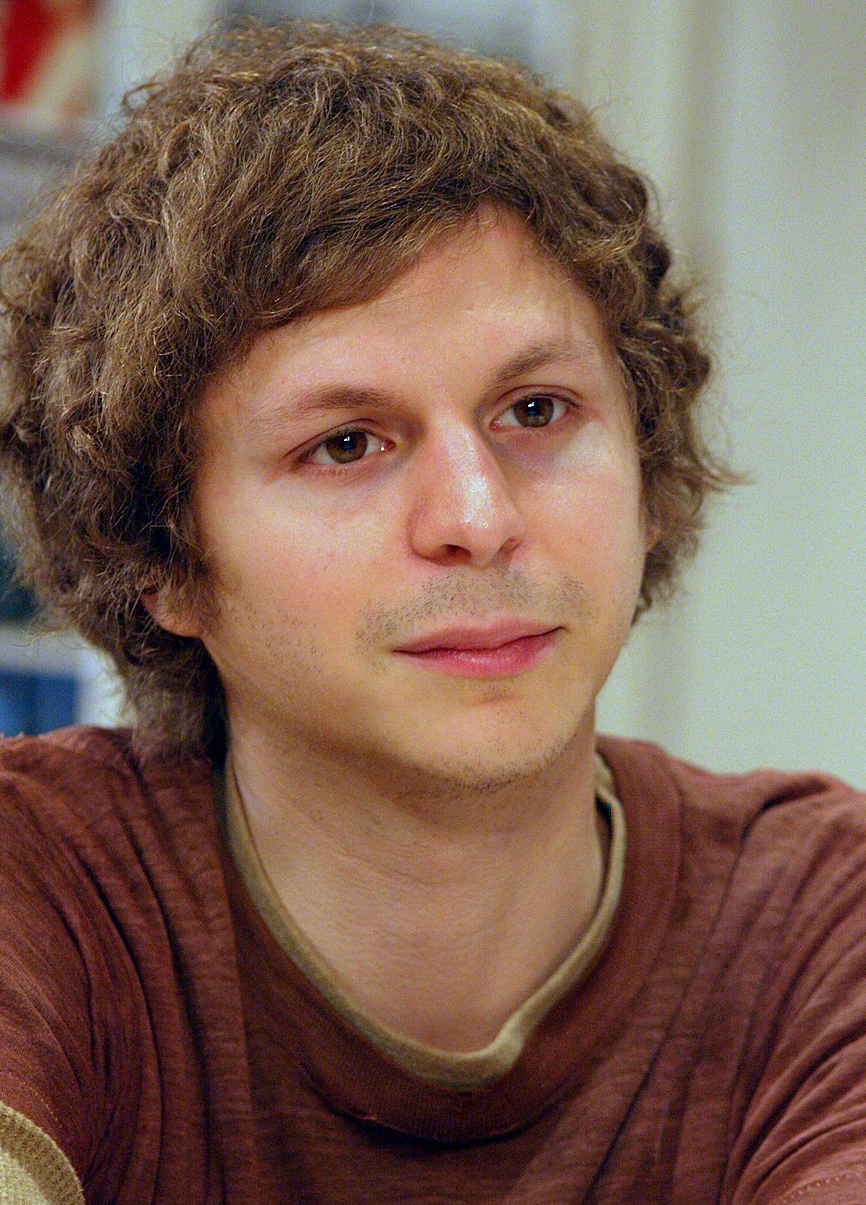
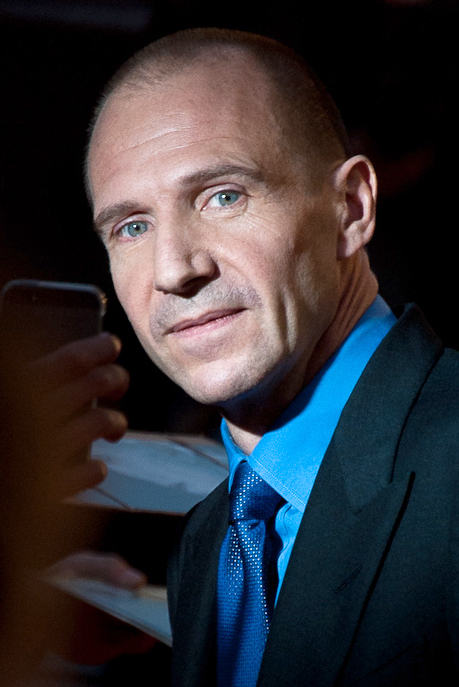
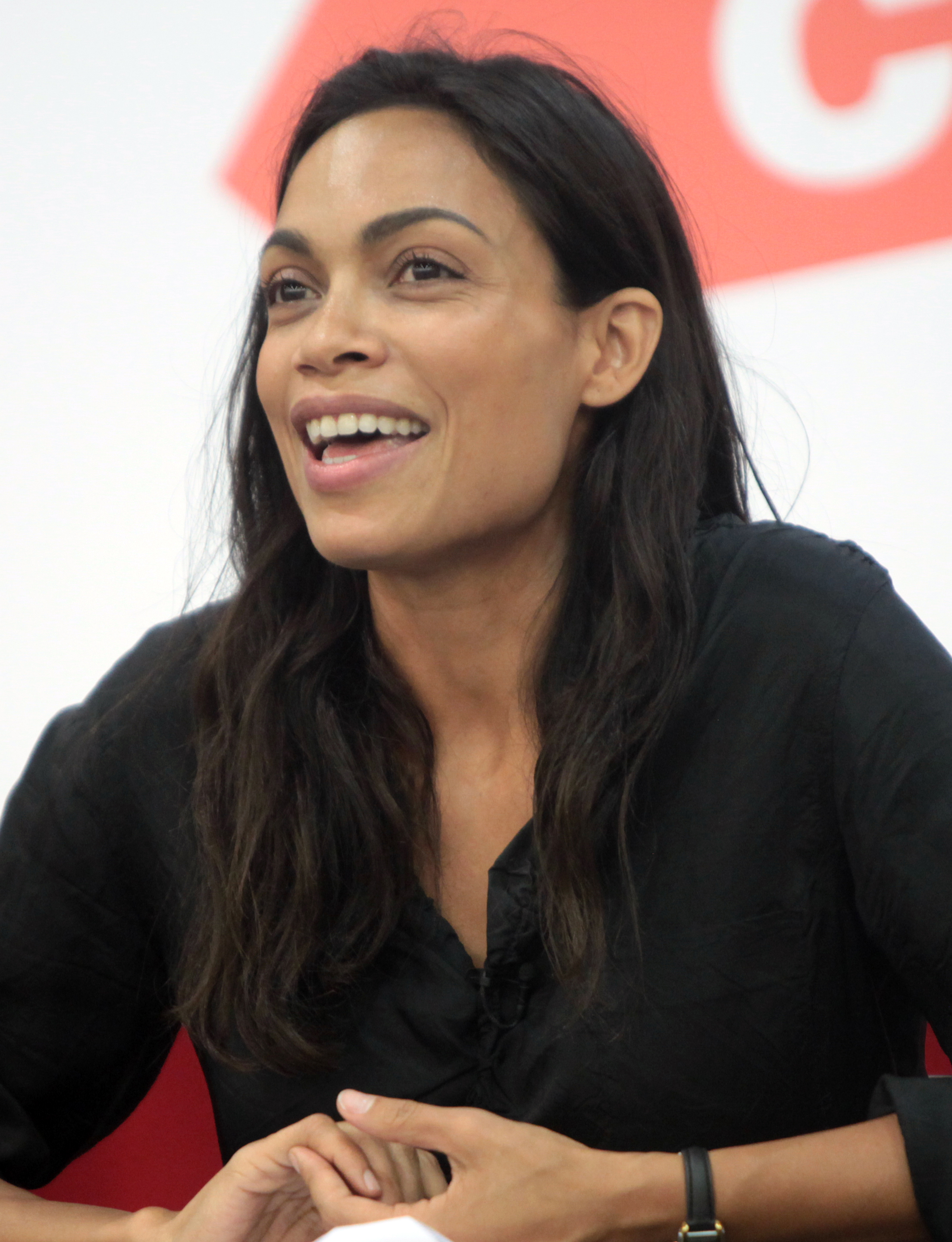
Zach Galifianakis, Michael Cera, Rosario Dawson and Ralph Fiennes (clockwise from top left) voiced Joker, Dick Grayson, Barbara Gordon and Alfred Pennyworth respectively.
- Will Arnett as Bruce Wayne / Batman: A billionaire by day and superhero by night, who defends Gotham City from crime. Arnett previously portrayed the character in The Lego Movie and later reprised his role in its sequel.
- Zach Galifianakis as The Joker: A clown-themed villain in Gotham City and Batman's archenemy, who defines himself by his conflict with him.
- Michael Cera as Dick Grayson / Robin: An orphan and Batman's adopted son and sidekick.
- Rosario Dawson as Barbara Gordon / Batgirl: The newly elected police commissioner of Gotham, who hopes to restructure the Gotham City Police Department so that the city could defend itself without Batman. She eventually comes to trust Batman and becomes Batgirl.
- Ralph Fiennes as Alfred Pennyworth: The Wayne family's butler, and Bruce's father figure and only confidant. Fiennes later reprised his role in The Lego Movie 2.
- Jenny Slate as Harley Quinn, Joker's partner in crime.
- Héctor Elizondo as James Gordon, the retired police commissioner of Gotham and Barbara's father.
- Ellie Kemper as Phyllis, the Phantom Zone's warden.
- Mariah Carey as Mayor McCaskill, the mayor of Gotham.
- Lauren White as Chief O'Hara, the police chief of Gotham.
- Todd Hansen and Chris McKay respectively as Captain Dale and Pilot Bill, the two pilots of the airplane hijacked by Joker at the beginning of the film.
- Brent Musburger, Ralph Garman and Chris Hardwick make cameo appearances as a trio of unnamed reporters.
- Mark Jonathan Davis as a fictionalized version of himself (his character Richard Cheese also appears through the use of archival recordings).
- Channing Tatum and Jonah Hill as Superman and Green Lantern, both reprising their respective roles from The Lego Movie.
- Adam DeVine as The Flash.
- Adam West as Batman (stock footage from the 1966-1968 television series)

Several actors voice the various villains from Batman's rogues gallery, including Billy Dee Williams as Two-Face (as a nod to his role as Harvey Dent, Two-Face's former identity, in the 1989 Batman film), Riki Lindhome as Poison Ivy, Conan O'Brien as the Riddler, Jason Mantzoukas as the Scarecrow, Zoë Kravitz as Catwoman (she would later portray Catwoman in The Batman), Matt Villa as Killer Croc, Kate Micucci as Clayface, Doug Benson as Bane (Benson's performance is a nod to Tom Hardy's portrayal of the character in The Dark Knight Rises), John Venzon as the Penguin (the character's appearance is a nod to Danny DeVito's portrayal of the character in Batman Returns), David Burrows as Mr. Freeze (Burrows additionally voices an anchorman) and Laura Kightlinger as Orca (Kightlinger also voices a reporter). The film also features villains from other franchises, including Sauron from the Middle-earth mythos (voiced by Jemaine Clement), the Wicked Witch of the West from The Wizard of Oz (also voiced by Riki Lindhome), Lord Voldemort from Harry Potter (voiced by Eddie Izzard; Fiennes did not reprise his role despite starring in the films), King Kong from the franchise of the same name, Agent Smith and his bodyguard agents from the Matrix movie franchise, the Swamp Creature from Lego Monster Fighters (both voiced by Seth Green), Medusa from Lego Minifigures (also voiced by Lauren White) and the Daleks from the Doctor Who franchise (voiced by Nicholas Briggs, reprising his role from said franchise).

The voice of the Batcomputer (credited as 'Puter), depicted here as an artificial intelligence controlling all of Batman's gadgets and vehicles, is courtesy of Siri, the digital assistant service from Apple Inc.

== Production ==
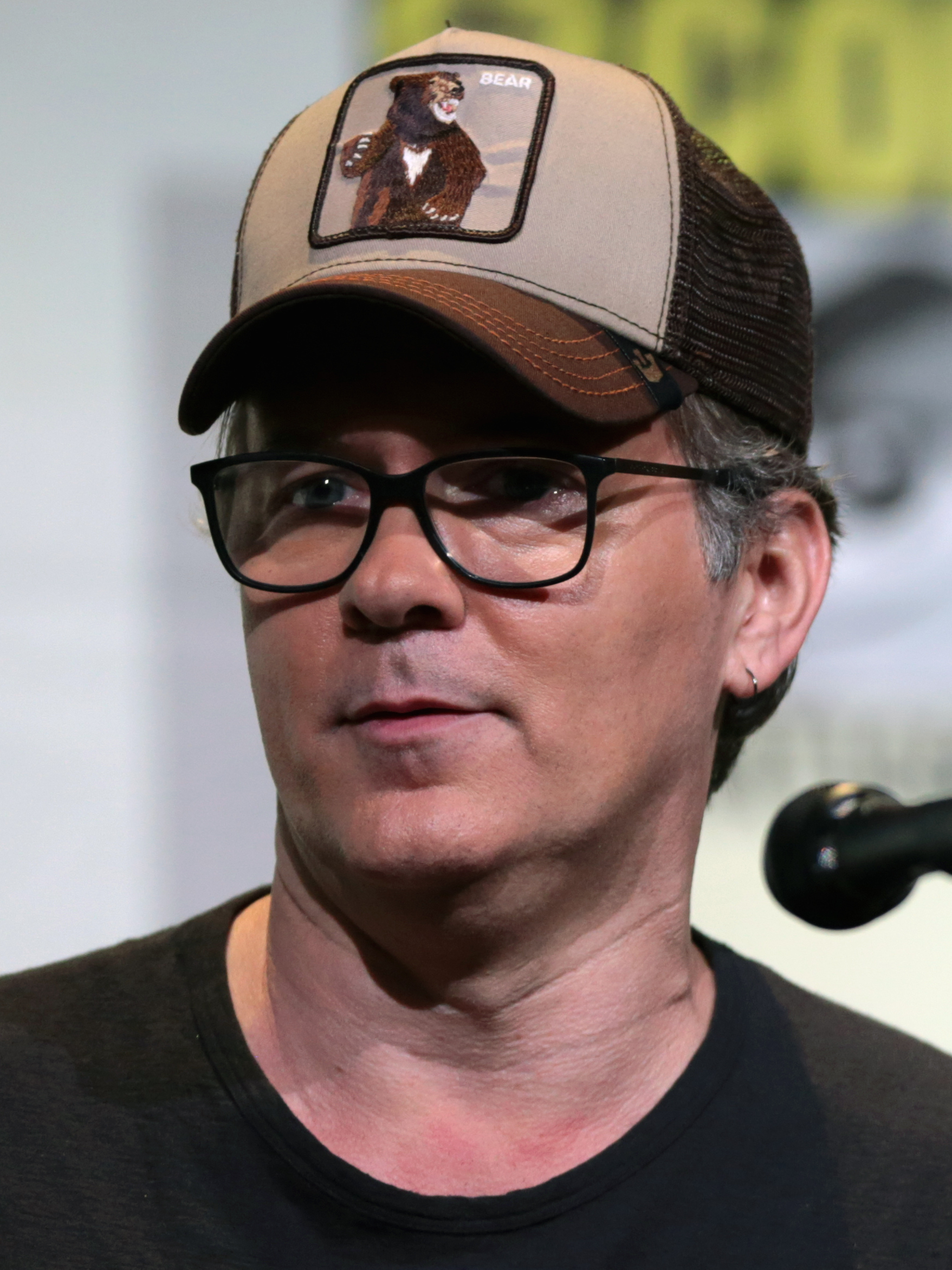
Chris McKay, the animation supervisor on The Lego Movie, director of The Lego Batman Movie

=== Development ===
In October 2014, following the success of The Lego Movie, Warner Bros. greenlit multiple Lego films, including The Lego Batman Movie, a spin-off starring Batman. Warner Bros. Pictures scheduled the release of The Lego Batman Movie for May 26, 2017, moving the release date for The Lego Movie 2 (later titled as The Lego Movie 2: The Second Part) to May 25, 2018. Chris McKay, who co-directed The Lego Movie, was brought on board to direct the film, making it his solo directorial debut. Will Arnett returned to voice Batman, with the story written by Seth Grahame-Smith, and the film produced by Dan Lin, Roy Lee, Phil Lord and Christopher Miller. On April 20, 2015, Warner Bros. moved up The Lego Batman Movie to a February 10, 2017, release.

According to Lin, he conceived The Lego Batman Movie to be a family-friendly version of Deadpool, although he described The Lego Movie as The Matrix for children. In an interview about his work on the film, McKay stated that working on the film was "a very mixed blessing" owing partly to the film's hectic time schedule for its production, remarking that the two-and-a-half years allocated to the film made it difficult to fit in everything that he wanted for the movie, considering his earlier work on The Lego Movie. His work on The Lego Batman Movie was influenced by the comedy portrayed in both The Naked Gun and Airplane! film series, with his pitch for the film to the studios being described as like "Jerry Maguire as directed by Michael Mann". His proposal to combine all the Batman eras featured in the comic book series and various media formats, including movies and comic series, despite a couple of issues—the total inconsistency inherent to such a task, and Lego rejecting some of the characters he proposed to include in the film—was based on his desire of how to portray Robin within the film's setting. In an interview regarding his version of the superhero duo, McKay stated:

I was thinking that we were basically taking the Burt Ward Robin and sticking him in the Batmobile with the Zack Snyder/Ben Affleck Batman, or the Frank Miller Batman. And putting these two different energies together. Somebody who's like the grumpiest, dark grittiest, broodiest Batman with the most positive, indefatigable kid.

In 2019, prior to the release of The Lego Movie 2: The Second Part, Chris Miller stated that all of the Lego movies are based on the imagination of a child character, with The Lego Movie events happening in young Finn's mind. Miller affirmed that The Lego Batman Movie was also from the imagination of Finn and Bianca, though the characters did not appear within the film.

=== Casting ===
In July 2015, Arnett's Arrested Development co-star Michael Cera was cast to voice Robin. In August 2015, Zach Galifianakis entered final negotiations to voice the Joker, with his role being confirmed shortly afterwards. In October 2015, Rosario Dawson was cast to voice Barbara Gordon, the daughter of police commissioner James Gordon who later becomes the crime-fighting heroine Batgirl. The following month, Ralph Fiennes was cast as Alfred Pennyworth, Bruce Wayne's butler. Initial reports indicated that Mariah Carey was playing Commissioner Gordon. However, she was actually cast as Mayor McCaskill.

=== Animation ===
Animation was done by Animal Logic, Autodesk Maya and Softimage was used to animate the film. Lego Digital Designer was used for LEGO model design.

=== Batman and pop culture references ===
As part of its production, the film was designed to make numerous references to previous Batman media. In two distinct scenes where Barbara Gordon depicts Batman's long history of services for the police and Alfred quotes Batman's previous films (as previous moments of emotional crisis), they mention: the 1940s Batman serials, the films Batman (1966), Batman (1989), Batman Returns (1992), Batman Forever (1995), Batman & Robin (1997), Batman Begins (2005), The Dark Knight (2008), The Dark Knight Rises (2012), Batman v Superman: Dawn of Justice (2016) and Suicide Squad (2016); the television shows Batman (1960s), Batman: The Animated Series (1990s), Batman Beyond (2000s) and The Batman (2000s); and the comics Detective Comics #27 (Batman's introductory story), The Dark Knight Returns (1986) and Gotham by Gaslight (1989). Other references include previous costumes worn by Batman and Robin and the various Batmobiles used. In most cases, their appearances in the film are done in a Lego style, with the exception being footage from a live-action shot of Adam West's depiction of Batman in the 1960s Batman series and a picture of Batman's suit from Batman & Robin. Climactic events from past Batman films involving the Joker have been mentioned, including "that time with the parade and the Prince music" (1989's Batman) and "the two boats" (The Dark Knight).

Alongside Joker, the main antagonist of the film's story, and Superman, who features heavily and has notable links to the Christopher Reeve films Superman (1978) and its sequel Superman II (1980), many other DC characters, both villains associated with Batman and other DC superheroes, feature in the film. The film's villains who have been featured in Batman comics, films and cartoons include: Man-Bat; Captain Boomerang; Egghead; Crazy Quilt; Eraser; Polka-Dot Man; Mime; Tarantula; King Tut from the 1960s series; Killer Moth; March Harriet; Zodiac Master; the Mutant Leader from The Dark Knight Returns; Doctor Phosphorus; Magpie; Calculator; Hugo Strange; an unidentified version of Red Hood; the Kabuki Twins from The Batman; Orca; Gentleman Ghost; Clock King; Calendar Man; Kite Man; Catman; Zebra-Man; and a variation of Condiment King from Batman: The Animated Series. The other DC heroes who feature, both from the Justice League and Super Friends, include: Wonder Woman; Aquaman; The Flash; Cyborg; Green Arrow; Black Canary; Hawkman; Hawkgirl; Martian Manhunter; Apache Chief; Black Vulcan; El Dorado; Samurai; Wonder Dog; the Wonder Twins; and Gleek. Although not part of the DC franchise, Iron Man from Marvel Comics is referenced in the film as part of a small joke about Batman's password for entering the Batcave, referencing the famous rivalry between DC and Marvel.

The film additionally features characters from other notable media franchises with them following the same narrative of The Lego Movie in that they came from worlds that co-exist alongside other aspects of the Lego universe, which are made up of Lego playsets of the various franchises. These additional characters include: Medusa from Lego Minifigures; the Swamp Creature, Mummy and Lord Vampyre from Lego Monster Fighters; King Kong; the Daleks from the Doctor Who franchise; The Wizard of Oz's Wicked Witch of the West and her flying monkeys; Clash of the Titans' Kraken; Agent Smith and his clones from The Matrix franchise; Jaws' shark; Harry Potter's Lord Voldemort; Sauron from the Middle-earth mythos; Jurassic Park's Tyrannosaurus and Velociraptors; Jason and the Argonauts' Skeleton Warriors; and the titular monsters from the Gremlins franchise. The scene where the gremlins attack the Batwing is a homage to The Twilight Zone episode, "Nightmare at 20,000 Feet", which in turn is a nod to their origins as fictional creatures of the same name infamous for causing malfunctions. There are additionally two more references in this scene, one being the origins of the term when 1920s Royal Air Force pilots introduced a superstition that "gremlins" were sabotaging doomed planes, a popular achievement during World War II, and the other being the Looney Tunes cartoon, Falling Hare, in which Bugs Bunny battles a mischievous gremlin as it terrorizes him at an airfield and in a plane. Originally, the film was going to include more villains such as the eponymous main antagonist from the Kill Bill duology, Darth Vader from the Star Wars franchise, Gangs of New York's interpretation of William Poole and Misery's Annie Wilkes, but those ideas never came into fruition.

The film also includes Batman watching the scene from Jerry Maguire where Tom Cruise says "You complete me" (which makes Batman laugh out loud); this line had been previously quoted by the Joker's counterpart from The Dark Knight. In the scene where Batman discusses possible team names he mentions Fox Force Five, which is the name of Mia Wallace's failed television pilot mentioned in Pulp Fiction. The Winged Avenger suit also pays homage to an episode of the same name from The Avengers. The airplane in the film's opening scene, known as McGuffin 1138 has a pair of references, one being The Maltese Falcon and the other being George Lucas's THX 1138. The X-ray security machine found in Arkham Asylum largely resembles the one used in Total Recall. The scene involving Alfred losing his grip and falling off the edge of a plane is a reference to Die Hard. Additionally regarding the character, he mentions the Marvel superhero Union Jack as he fights off one of the villains. The film's use of Cutting Crew's "(I Just) Died in Your Arms" is a nod to Never Been Kissed. Other references in the film include Bad Boys, Gleaming the Cube and Gymkata.

The casting of Billy Dee Williams as Two-Face references 1989's Batman, in which Williams played District Attorney Harvey Dent, before his transition to Two-Face. This was the second Lego film that Williams had a role in, after The Lego Movie, in which he voiced the Star Wars character Lando Calrissian from The Empire Strikes Back and Return of the Jedi. Director Chris McKay said the film's depiction of Gotham City was inspired by Chicago partly due to Christopher Nolan having filmed The Dark Knight Trilogy in Chicago.

The film also references Arrested Development, which Arnett and Cera starred in together as an uncle and nephew.

== Music ==
The Lego Batman Movie is the first in the franchise not to be composed by Mark Mothersbaugh; the film score is composed by Lorne Balfe. The soundtrack album was released by WaterTower Music on February 3, 2017, through two-disc CD and for digital download, while the vinyl version was released on May 19, 2017.

== Marketing ==
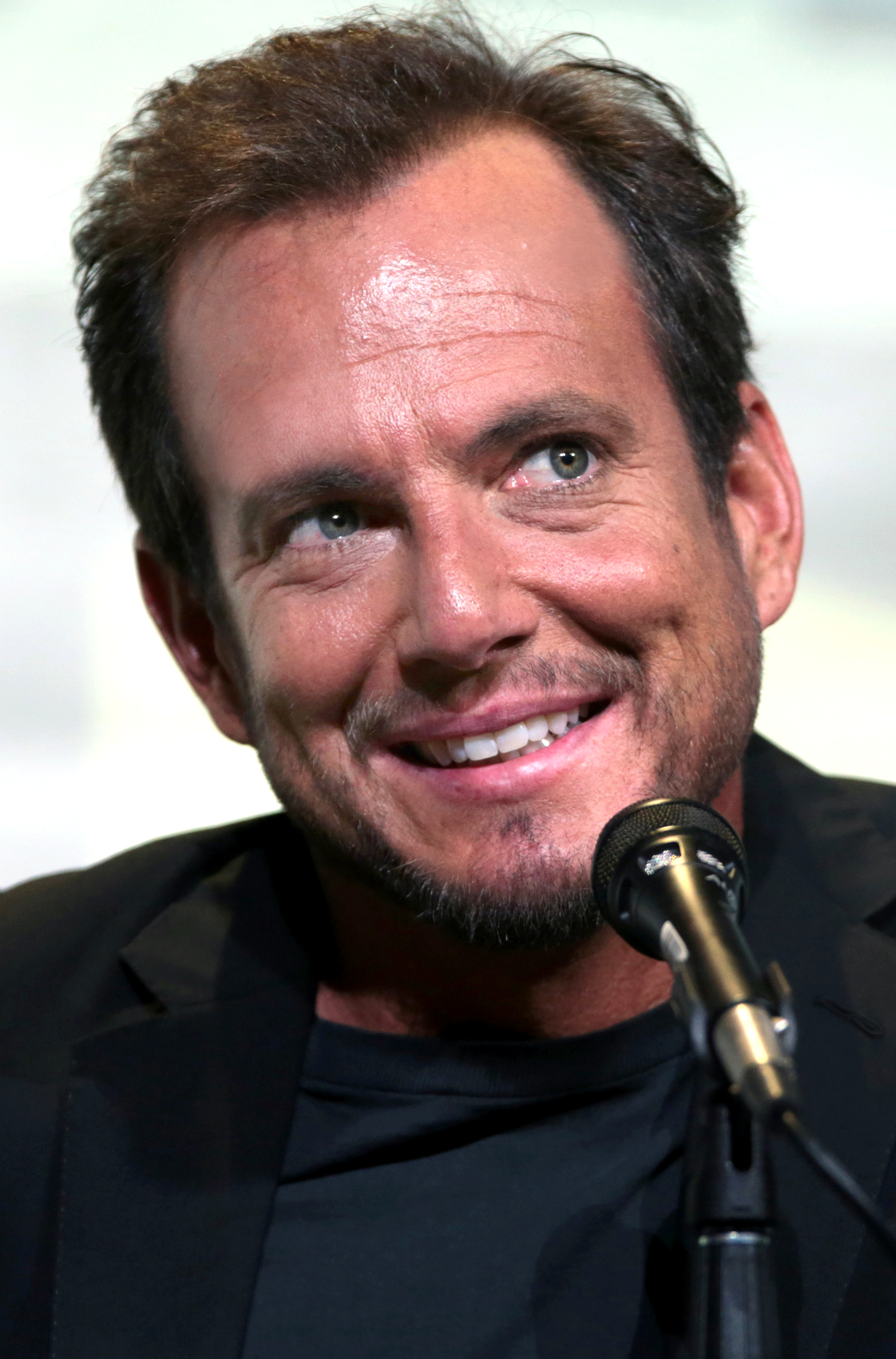
Will Arnett, voice actor of Batman, promoting the film at the 2016 San Diego Comic-Con

The first teaser trailer for The Lego Batman Movie was released on March 24, 2016, and features the song "Black and Yellow" by Wiz Khalifa. It was attached to showings of Batman v Superman: Dawn of Justice in theatres. A second teaser trailer was released on March 28, 2016, and features references to all live-action iterations of Batman, from the 1960s Batman TV series to Batman v Superman. A third trailer was released on July 23, 2016. A fourth trailer was released on November 4, 2016. Over twenty Lego sets inspired by scenes from the film were released for the film including two sets of Collectible Minifigures. A Story Pack for the toys-to-life video game Lego Dimensions based on The Lego Batman Movie was released on February 10, 2017, alongside the film. The pack adds a six-level story campaign adapting the events of the film, and includes playable figures of Robin and Batgirl, a driveable Batwing, and a constructible gateway model based on the Batcomputer. A Fun Pack including Excalibur Batman and his Bionic Steed was also released the same day.

On January 14, 2017, at the North American International Auto Show in Detroit, Chevrolet unveiled a life-sized Lego Batmobile inspired by the design featured in the film, constructed from around 350,000 Lego pieces. As a related promotion, a Bat-Signal (alternating between Batman's emblem and the Chevrolet logo) was projected on the Renaissance Center over the weekend, and Chevrolet released a new television commercial tying into the film, featuring the Batmobile as a crossover with its ongoing "Real People, Not Actors" campaign.

Warner Bros. released several promotional tie-ins on the week of the movie's release. LEGO billboard versions of several TV shows were shown outside of the studio lot, that took 300 hours to make out of 10,000 bricks. At this time, McDonald's began selling Happy Meal toys based on the movie itself. The Big Bang Theory included a LEGO version of the opening sequence in the episode "The Locomotion Reverberation" that first aired on CBS. In addition, the network aired two LEGO commercials featuring Batman and the cast.

The CW featured LEGO end cards for Supergirl, The Flash, Legends of Tomorrow, and Arrow, respectively, on the week of the movie's release. All four DC shows also include a special variant of the Berlanti Productions logo that featured Batman's cameo and a new recording from Greg Berlanti's real-life father who says "Batman, move your head." instead of the usual "Greg, move your head." In addition, the network aired two commercials where Batman interacts with the characters from each show.

== Release ==
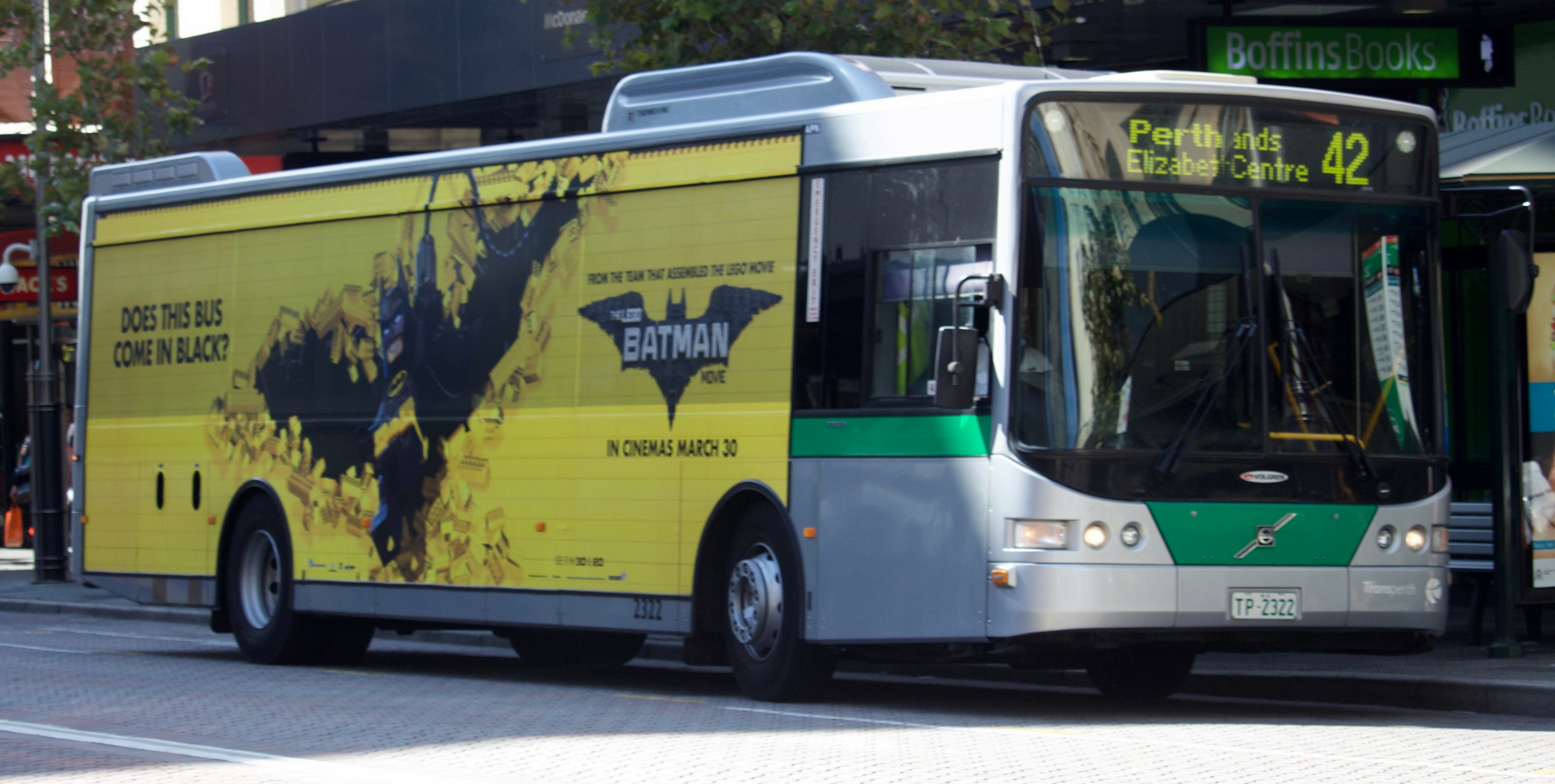
A bus advertising the film in Perth

=== Theatrical ===
The film's world premiere was conducted in Dublin, Ireland on January 29, 2017, whereupon it went into general release from February 8; it was released in Denmark on February 9, and in the United States and the United Kingdom on February 10. Its overall release saw movie theatres displaying the film in 3D, RealD 3D, Dolby Cinema, IMAX 3D and 4DX. though the latter format was restricted to 3D for North America, while international countries were able to view it in IMAX.

=== Home media ===
The Lego Batman Movie was released on Digital HD on May 19, 2017. The release included the theatrical short film The Master: A LEGO Ninjago Short, as well as four new short films: Dark Hoser, Batman is Just Not That Into You, Cooking with Alfred and Movie Sound Effects: How Do They Do That?. There is also an audio commentary, along with behind-the-scenes featurettes and deleted scenes. The Lego Batman Movie was released on DVD, Blu-ray (2D and 3D), and Ultra HD Blu-ray by Warner Bros. Home Entertainment on June 13, 2017. The film debuted at No. 3 on the NPD VideoScan overall disc sales chart behind Beauty and the Beast and John Wick: Chapter 2. Selling 1.9 million units and generating a revenue of $41 million, it was the sixth-highest-selling animated title of 2017, after Moana, Trolls, Sing, Despicable Me 3 and Cars 3, as well as the fourteenth-highest-selling title of that year overall.

== Reception ==
=== Box office ===
The Lego Batman Movie grossed $175.8 million in the United States and Canada and $136.2 million in other territories for a worldwide gross of $312 million, against a production budget of $80 million.

In the United States and Canada, The Lego Batman Movie opened alongside two other sequels, Fifty Shades Darker and John Wick: Chapter 2, and was projected to gross around $60 million from 4,088 theaters in its opening weekend. It earned $2.2 million from Thursday-night previews and $14.5 million on Friday. It went on to open with $53 million, finishing first at the box office. In its second weekend, the film grossed $32.7 million (a small drop of 38.4%), again topping the box office; with the additional President's Day holiday on Monday, it made a total of $42.7 million for the weekend. In its third weekend of release, the film dropped to second at the box office, behind newcomer Get Out, grossing $19.2 million (a drop of 41.2%).

Outside North America, the film was simultaneously released in 61 countries, and was expected to gross around $40 million over its first three days. It ended up grossing $37 million in its opening weekend, including $9.3 million in the United Kingdom, $2.6 million in Mexico, $2.3 million in Germany and $2.2 million in Russia. In the United Kingdom, the film topped the box office for three weeks until it was dethroned by Logan in its fourth weekend. Meanwhile, The Lego Batman Movie opened in China with $3.7 million and ranked in fourth place behind the latter film, A Dog's Purpose and Resident Evil: The Final Chapter.

=== Critical response ===
On review aggregation website Rotten Tomatoes, the film has an approval rating of 89% based on 313 reviews, with an average rating of 7.5/10. The website's critical consensus reads, "The Lego Batman Movie continues its block-buster franchise's winning streak with another round of dizzyingly funny—and beautifully animated—family-friendly mayhem." It was ranked the 23rd best superhero movie of all time on the site. As of January 2025, it has fallen to 30th. On Metacritic, the film has a score of 75 out of 100, based on 48 critics, indicating "generally favorable reviews". Audiences polled by CinemaScore gave the film an average grade of "A−" on an A+ to F scale.

Mike Ryan of Uproxx gave the film a positive review, praising its comedy, and saying: "The Lego Batman Movie isn't the same experience as watching The LEGO Movie, but I also don't think it's trying to be. It's trying to be a fun superhero movie with clever callbacks to previous Batman films (every single Batman movie all the way back to the 1940s serials are referenced) that can, at least, provide DC superhero fans with a taste of fun amidst all the doom and gloom. (That can either be a reference to 'the real world' or the current DC Cinematic Universe films, you can choose either one you want or both.) And at that, The Lego Batman Movie succeeds." Chris Nashawaty of Entertainment Weekly gave the film a "B+" and wrote, "Lego Batman revs so fast and moves so frenetically that it becomes a little exhausting by the end. It flirts with being too much of a good thing. But rarely has corporate brainwashing been so much fun and gone down with such a delightful aftertaste." Tara Brady of The Irish Times earned a 4 out of 5 rating, saying, "Under the direction of Robot Chicken's Chris McKay, Arnett relentlessly prods at Batman with a welcome helping of BoJack Horseman-brand misery and narcissism." In a 3 out of 4 review, Moira MacDonald of The Seattle Times said, "Kids will enjoy the vivid colors and clever use of Lego shapes (the characters shake hands by interlocking their pieces), as well as the dialogue, which has the cheery, slapdash feel of having been written by extremely clever 12-year-olds."

Tom Huddleston of Time Out earned a 4 out of 5 score and wrote, "The inept egomaniac is a time-honoured comedy archetype - think Jack Sparrow, Daffy Duck or Donald Trump - but thanks to razor-sharp writing and Will Arnett's snarling, impossible-to-hate vocal performance, this Batman is fresh and fun." Owen Gleiberman of Variety said, "Your average Pixar comedy thumbs its nose at a great many things, but The Lego Batman Movie is a helter-skelter lampoon in the daftly exhilarating spirit of Mad magazine and the Naked Gun films." David Ehrlich of IndieWire gave it a "B+", describing it as "2017's only good story about a self-obsessed cartoon billionaire who gets money from Steve Mnuchin." Robbie Collin of The Daily Telegraph earned a 4 out of 5 scoring and said, "While it never achieves, or even reaches for, The Lego Movie's unexpected profundity and emotional bite, in purely logistical terms, The Lego Batman Movie is a thing of wonder. There are around four (great) films' worth of action and jokes here, crammed into a story so streamlined it might have been assembled in the Lockheed wind tunnel."

Justin Chang of the Los Angeles Times was positive in his review, saying, "In its best moments, this gag-a-minute Bat-roast serves as a reminder that, in the right hands, a sharp comic scalpel can be an instrument of revelation as well as ridicule." J. R. Jones of the Chicago Reader wrote, "A movie of endlessly hurtling momentum, this is Mad Max: Fury Road for five-year-olds, and not nearly as much fun as snapping those bricks together." Peter Howell of The Toronto Star gave the film 2.5 out of 4 stars, saying, "First-time director Chris McKay, late of the Cartoon Network's Robot Chicken, throws at the screen seemingly everything his committee of screenwriters scripted." Michael O'Sullivan of The Washington Post praised the film for its heart, humor, and action which "snap together, with a satisfying click."

== Accolades ==
Award	Date of ceremony	Category	Recipient(s)	Result	Ref.
AACTA Awards	December 6, 2017	Best Sound	Gregg Landaker, Rick Lisle, Wayne Pashley, Fabian Sanjurgo and Michael Semanick	Nominated	
AACTA Awards	December 6, 2017	Best Visual Effects or Animation	Rob Coleman, Damien Gray, Miles Green, Amber Naismith and Craig Welsh	Nominated	
Annie Awards	February 3, 2018	Directing in a Feature Production	Chris McKay	Nominated	
Annie Awards	February 3, 2018	Voice Acting in an Animated Feature Production	Zach Galifianakis	Nominated	
Annie Awards	February 3, 2018	Editorial in an Animated Feature Production	David Burrows, Matt Villa and John Venzon	Nominated	
American Cinema Editors	January 26, 2018	Best Edited Animated Feature Film	David Burrows, Matt Villa and John Venzon	Nominated	
Art Directors Guild	January 27, 2018	Excellence in Production Design for an Animated Film	Grant Freckelton	Nominated	
Cinema Audio Society Awards	February 24, 2018	Outstanding Achievement in Sound Mixing for a Motion Picture – Animated	Jason Oliver, Michael Semanick, Gregg Landaker, Wayne Pashley, Stephen Lipson and Lisa Simpson	Nominated	
Critics' Choice Movie Awards	January 11, 2018	Best Animated Film	Chris McKay	Nominated	
Detroit Film Critics Society	December 7, 2017	Best Animated Film	The Lego Batman Movie	Won	
Empire Awards	March 18, 2018	Best Animated Film	The Lego Batman Movie	Nominated	
Florida Film Critics Circle	December 23, 2017	Best Animated Film	The Lego Batman Movie	Nominated	
Georgia Film Critics Association	January 12, 2018	Best Animated Film	The Lego Batman Movie	Nominated	
Golden Tomato Awards	January 3, 2018	Best Animated Film	The Lego Batman Movie	2nd Place	
Golden Trailer Awards	June 6, 2017	Best Animation/Family	The Lego Batman Movie	Won	
Golden Trailer Awards	June 6, 2017	Most Original Trailer	The Lego Batman Movie	Nominated	
Golden Reel Awards	February 18, 2018	Outstanding Achievement in Sound Editing – Feature Animation	Wayne Pashley, Rick Lisle, Fabian Sanjurjo, Andrew Miller, Mario Gabrieli, Jared Dwyer, Emma Mitchell, Nigel Christensen, Terry Rodman, Christopher S. Aud, F. Hudson Miller, Beth Bezzina, Sonal Joshi, Derryn Pasquill, Linda Yeaney, John Simpson and Will Kaplan	Nominated	
Hollywood Music in Media Awards	November 16, 2017	Best Original Score – Animated Film	Lorne Balfe	Nominated	
Houston Film Critics Society	January 6, 2018	Best Animated Film	The Lego Batman Movie	Nominated	
Heartland Film Festival	October 22, 2017	Truly Moving Picture Award	Chris McKay	Won	
IGN Awards	December 19, 2017	Best Animated Movie	The Lego Batman Movie	Runner-up	
Kids' Choice Awards	March 24, 2018	Favorite Animated Film	The Lego Batman Movie	Nominated	
Movieguide Awards	March 2018	Best Movie for Families	The Lego Batman Movie	Nominated	
MTV Movie & TV Awards	May 7, 2017	Best Comedic Performance	Will Arnett	Nominated	
Online Film Critics Society	December 28, 2017	Best Animated Film	The Lego Batman Movie	Nominated	
Producers Guild of America Award	January 20, 2018	Outstanding Producer of Animated Theatrical Motion Picture	Dan Lin, Phil Lord and Christopher Miller	Nominated	
Satellite Awards	February 10, 2018	Best Animated or Mixed Media Feature	The Lego Batman Movie	Nominated	
St. Louis Film Critics Association	December 17, 2017	Best Animated Feature	Chris McKay	Nominated	
Teen Choice Awards	August 13, 2017	Choice Movie Actor: Comedy	Will Arnett	Nominated	
Visual Effects Society	February 13, 2018	Outstanding Visual Effects in an Animated Feature	Rob Coleman, Amber Naismith, Grant Freckelton and Damien Gray	Nominated	
Washington D.C. Area Film Critics Association	December 8, 2017	Best Animated Feature	The Lego Batman Movie	Nominated	
Washington D.C. Area Film Critics Association	December 8, 2017	Best Animated Voice Performance	Will Arnett	Nominated	
Washington D.C. Area Film Critics Association	December 8, 2017	Best Animated Voice Performance	Michael Cera	Nominated	

== Other media ==
=== Video games ===
Based on The Lego Batman Movie, Warner Bros. Interactive Entertainment released the endless-runner game coinciding with the release of the film. It was released for Android and iOS. A Story Pack and Fun Pack based on the film were released for Lego Dimensions.

== Cancelled sequel ==
On December 5, 2018, McKay announced a sequel to The Lego Batman Movie was in the works, with him returning to direct. The film was set to be released in 2022. However, following the disappointing box office returns of The Lego Movie 2: The Second Part in 2019, Universal Pictures acquired the film rights to the Lego brand in April 2020, effectively cancelling the sequel due to Warner Bros. owning the rights to DC Comics.

In June 2021, McKay revealed that the script was being written by Michael Waldron and Dan Harmon. It would have focused on Batman's relationship with the Justice League, particularly Superman, and the main villains would have been Lex Luthor and OMAC. Waldron revealed that the film was tentatively titled Lego Superfriends.
