= List of films based on toys =

This article lists feature length animated and live action theatrical, television and direct-to-video films based on toys, tabletop games and trading cards. Many of these films are based on dolls and action figures made by American toy companies Hasbro and Mattel.

== History of films based on toys ==
Prior to 1977, toys were released together with films as merchandising tie-ins. Films that were suitably toyetic spawned numerous licensed properties, often marketed heavily to children. Beginning in the late 1970s, this approach was flipped as films began to appear that were based on popular toys. In 1977, Raggedy Ann & Andy: A Musical Adventure debuted as the first theatrical motion picture in which a consumer toy was the star. During the 1980s, action figures got their own films, such as Masters of the Universe (The Secret of the Sword) and Transformers (The Transformers: The Movie), as did dolls, such as Pound Puppies (Pound Puppies and the Legend of Big Paw) and My Little Pony (My Little Pony: The Movie). Also in the 1980s, the greeting card companies American Greetings and Hallmark Cards created popular characters that were made into toys and subsequently adapted into films, such as The Care Bears (The Care Bears Movie), Rainbow Brite (Rainbow Brite and the Star Stealer), and Strawberry Shortcake (Strawberry Shortcake: The Sweet Dreams Movie).

A resurgence of live action film adaptations of toy properties began in 2007 with the release of Transformers, the first film in what would become the Transformers film franchise. The first film in the G.I. Joe film series, G.I. Joe: The Rise of Cobra, was released two years later. In 2008, Hasbro entered into a deal with Universal Pictures to make at least four films based on its brands and products. In 2012, the poor performance of the first film from this partnership, Battleship, caused other projects in development to be shelved or sold off to other studios. The success of The Lego Movie in 2014 showed that even intellectual properties without an existing narrative, or even familiar characters, could be profitable and its success renewed the interest of toy companies and film studios in producing toy-related projects stuck in development hell.

In 2017, Hasbro Studios entered into a five-year production and distribution deal with Paramount Pictures to develop additional productions based on Hasbro brands. In 2021, Mattel Films announced plans to release 13 films based on Mattel toys and games, such as Hot Wheels, Magic 8 Ball, Masters of the Universe, Rock 'Em Sock 'Em Robots, Polly Pocket, View-Master, American Girl and Uno, as well as an original intellectual property in Christmas Balloon. After being in development for over a decade, a live-action film adaptation of Barbie by Warner Bros. Pictures, simply titled Barbie, with Margot Robbie cast in the titular role and directed by Greta Gerwig, was released in 2023, and was the first live action Barbie film after numerous computer-animated films and specials. The film received critical acclaim and grossed more than $1 billion in worldwide box office sales, becoming the second highest-grossing film of 2023, the highest-grossing film of all time solely directed by a woman and from Warner Bros. in their centennial anniversary and the 25th highest-grossing film of all-time.

== Live-action films based on toys ==
Film title	Year	Source toy	Manufacturer	Release type
Samantha: An American Girl Holiday	2004	American Girl	Mattel	Television film
Felicity: An American Girl Adventure	2005	American Girl	Mattel	Television film
Molly: An American Girl on the Home Front	2006	American Girl	Mattel	Television film
Kit Kittredge: An American Girl	2008	American Girl	Mattel	Theatrical release
An American Girl: Chrissa Stands Strong	2009	American Girl	Mattel	Direct-to-video
An American Girl: McKenna Shoots for the Stars	2012	American Girl	Mattel	Direct-to-video
An American Girl: Saige Paints the Sky	2013	American Girl	Mattel	Direct-to-video
An American Girl: Isabelle Dances Into the Spotlight	2014	American Girl	Mattel	Direct-to-video
An American Girl: Grace Stirs Up Success	2015	American Girl	Mattel	Direct-to-video
An American Girl: Lea to the Rescue	2016	American Girl	Mattel	Direct-to-video
Battleship	2012	Battleship	Hasbro	Theatrical release
Bratz: The Movie	2007	Bratz	MGA Entertainment	Theatrical release
Barbie	2023	Barbie	Mattel	Theatrical release
Clue	1985	Cluedo	Waddingtons/Parker Brothers	Theatrical release
Dungeons & Dragons	2000	Dungeons & Dragons	TSR/Wizards of the Coast	Theatrical release
Dungeons & Dragons: Wrath of the Dragon God	2005	Dungeons & Dragons	TSR/Wizards of the Coast	Television film
Dungeons & Dragons: The Book of Vile Darkness	2012	Dungeons & Dragons	TSR/Wizards of the Coast	Direct-to-video
Dungeons & Dragons: Honor Among Thieves	2023	Dungeons & Dragons	TSR/Wizards of the Coast	Theatrical release
The Garbage Pail Kids Movie	1987	Garbage Pail Kids	Topps	Theatrical release
G.I. Joe: The Rise of Cobra	2009	G.I. Joe	Hasbro	Theatrical release
G.I. Joe: Retaliation	2013	G.I. Joe	Hasbro	Theatrical release
Snake Eyes	2021	G.I. Joe	Hasbro	Theatrical release
The Hugga Bunch	1985	The Hugga Bunch	Hallmark Cards/Kenner Products	Television film
Mars Attacks!	1996	Mars Attacks	Topps	Theatrical release
Masters of the Universe	1987	Masters of the Universe	Mattel	Theatrical release
Masters of the Universe	2026	Masters of the Universe	Mattel	Theatrical release
Matchbox: The Movie	2026	Matchbox	Mattel	Streaming service release
Monster High: The Movie	2022	Monster High	Mattel	Television film
Monster High 2	2023	Monster High	Mattel	Television film
My Pet Monster	1986	My Pet Monster	American Greetings	Direct-to-video
Ouija	2014	Ouija	Hasbro	Theatrical release
Ouija: Origin of Evil	2016	Ouija	Hasbro	Theatrical release
Robosapien: Rebooted	2013	RoboSapien	WowWee	Theatrical release
Transformers	2007	Transformers	Hasbro/Tomy	Theatrical release
Transformers: Revenge of the Fallen	2009	Transformers	Hasbro/Tomy	Theatrical release
Transformers: Dark of the Moon	2011	Transformers	Hasbro/Tomy	Theatrical release
Transformers: Age of Extinction	2014	Transformers	Hasbro/Tomy	Theatrical release
Transformers: The Last Knight	2017	Transformers	Hasbro/Tomy	Theatrical release
Bumblebee	2018	Transformers	Hasbro/Tomy	Theatrical release
Transformers: Rise of the Beasts	2023	Transformers	Hasbro/Tomy	Theatrical release

== Animated films based on toys ==
Film title	Year	Source toy	Manufacturer	Release type
Action Man: Robot Atak	2004	Action Man	Palitoy/Hasbro	Direct-to-video
Action Man: X Missions - The Movie	2005	Action Man	Palitoy/Hasbro	Direct-to-video
Action Man: The Gangrene Code	2006	Action Man	Palitoy/Hasbro	Direct-to-video (Mexico only)
Barbie and the Rockers: Out of This World	1987	Barbie	Mattel	Television film
Barbie and the Sensations: Rockin' Back to Earth	1987	Barbie	Mattel	Television film
Barbie in the Nutcracker	2001	Barbie	Mattel	Direct-to-video
Barbie as Rapunzel	2002	Barbie	Mattel	Direct-to-video
Barbie of Swan Lake	2003	Barbie	Mattel	Direct-to-video
Barbie as the Princess and the Pauper	2004	Barbie	Mattel	Direct-to-video
Barbie: Fairytopia	2005	Barbie	Mattel	Direct-to-video
Barbie and the Magic of Pegasus	2005	Barbie	Mattel	Direct-to-video
Barbie Fairytopia: Mermaidia	2006	Barbie	Mattel	Direct-to-video
The Barbie Diaries	2006	Barbie	Mattel	Direct-to-video
Barbie in the 12 Dancing Princesses	2006	Barbie	Mattel	Direct-to-video
Barbie Fairytopia: Magic of the Rainbow	2007	Barbie	Mattel	Direct-to-video
Barbie as the Island Princess	2007	Barbie	Mattel	Direct-to-video
Barbie: Mariposa and Her Butterfly Fairy Friends	2008	Barbie	Mattel	Direct-to-video
Barbie & the Diamond Castle	2008	Barbie	Mattel	Direct-to-video
Barbie in a Christmas Carol	2008	Barbie	Mattel	Direct-to-video
Barbie: Thumbelina	2009	Barbie	Mattel	Direct-to-video
Barbie and the Three Musketeers	2009	Barbie	Mattel	Direct-to-video
Barbie in a Mermaid Tale	2010	Barbie	Mattel	Direct-to-video
Barbie: A Fashion Fairytale	2010	Barbie	Mattel	Direct-to-video
Barbie: A Fairy Secret	2011	Barbie	Mattel	Direct-to-video
Barbie: Princess Charm School	2011	Barbie	Mattel	Direct-to-video
Barbie: A Perfect Christmas	2011	Barbie	Mattel	Direct-to-video
Barbie in a Mermaid Tale 2	2012	Barbie	Mattel	Direct-to-video
Barbie: The Princess & the Popstar	2012	Barbie	Mattel	Direct-to-video
Barbie in the Pink Shoes	2013	Barbie	Mattel	Direct-to-video
Barbie: Mariposa & the Fairy Princess	2013	Barbie	Mattel	Direct-to-video
Barbie & Her Sisters in A Pony Tale	2013	Barbie	Mattel	Direct-to-video
Barbie: The Pearl Princess	2014	Barbie	Mattel	Direct-to-video
Barbie and the Secret Door	2014	Barbie	Mattel	Direct-to-video
Barbie in Princess Power	2015	Barbie	Mattel	Direct-to-video
Barbie in Rock 'N Royals	2015	Barbie	Mattel	Direct-to-video
Barbie & Her Sisters in The Great Puppy Adventure	2015	Barbie	Mattel	Direct-to-video
Barbie: Spy Squad	2016	Barbie	Mattel	Direct-to-video
Barbie: Star Light Adventure	2016	Barbie	Mattel	Direct-to-video
Barbie & Her Sisters in A Puppy Chase	2016	Barbie	Mattel	Direct-to-video
Barbie: Video Game Hero	2017	Barbie	Mattel	Direct-to-video
Barbie Dolphin Magic	2017	Barbie	Mattel	Television film
Barbie: Princess Adventure	2020	Barbie	Mattel	Television film
Barbie & Chelsea: The Lost Birthday	2021	Barbie	Mattel	Television film
Barbie: Big City, Big Dreams	2021	Barbie	Mattel	Television film
Barbie: Mermaid Power	2022	Barbie	Mattel	Television film
Barbie: Epic Road Trip	2022	Barbie	Mattel	Streaming service interactive special
Barbie: Skipper and the Big Babysitting Adventure	2023	Barbie	Mattel	Television film
Barbie and Stacie to the Rescue	2024	Barbie	Mattel	Television film
Barbie & Teresa: Recipe for Friendship	2025	Barbie	Mattel	Television film
Bayala: A Magical Adventure	2019	Bayala	Schleich	Theatrical release
Bionicle: Mask of Light	2003	Bionicle	The Lego Group	Direct-to-video
Bionicle 2: Legends of Metru Nui	2004	Bionicle	The Lego Group	Direct-to-video
Bionicle 3: Web of Shadows	2005	Bionicle	The Lego Group	Direct-to-video
Bionicle: The Legend Reborn	2009	Bionicle	The Lego Group	Direct-to-video
BraveStarr: The Movie	1988	BraveStarr	Mattel	Direct-to-video
Bratz: Starrin' & Stylin'	2004	Bratz	MGA Entertainment	Direct-to-video
Bratz: Rock Angelz	2005	Bratz	MGA Entertainment	Direct-to-video
Bratz: Genie Magic	2006	Bratz	MGA Entertainment	Direct-to-video
Bratz: Passion 4 Fashion Diamondz	2006	Bratz	MGA Entertainment	Direct-to-video
Bratz: Fashion Pixiez	2007	Bratz	MGA Entertainment	Direct-to-video
Bratz: Girlz Really Rock	2008	Bratz	MGA Entertainment	Direct-to-video
Bratz: Pampered Petz	2010	Bratz	MGA Entertainment	Direct-to-video
Bratz: Desert Jewelz - Genie Magic 2	2012	Bratz	MGA Entertainment	Direct-to-video
Bratz Go to Paris: The Movie	2013	Bratz	MGA Entertainment	Direct-to-video
Bratz Babyz: The Movie	2006	Bratz Babyz	MGA Entertainment	Direct-to-video
Bratz Super Babyz	2007	Bratz Babyz	MGA Entertainment	Direct-to-video
Bratz Babyz Save Christmas	2008	Bratz Babyz	MGA Entertainment	Direct-to-video
Bratz Kidz: Sleep-Over Adventure	2007	Bratz Kidz	MGA Entertainment	Direct-to-video
Bratz Kidz: Fairy Talez	2008	Bratz Kidz	MGA Entertainment	Direct-to-video
The Cabbage Patch Kids' First Christmas	1984	Cabbage Patch Kids	Coleco/Hasbro/Mattel/Toys "R" Us/Play Along Toys/Jakks Pacific/Wicked Cool Toys	TV special
Cabbage Patch Kids: The New Kid	1995	Cabbage Patch Kids	Coleco/Hasbro/Mattel/Toys "R" Us/Play Along Toys/Jakks Pacific/Wicked Cool Toys	Direct-to-video
Cabbage Patch Kids: The Clubhouse	1996	Cabbage Patch Kids	Coleco/Hasbro/Mattel/Toys "R" Us/Play Along Toys/Jakks Pacific/Wicked Cool Toys	Direct-to-video
Cabbage Patch Kids: The Screen Test	1997	Cabbage Patch Kids	Coleco/Hasbro/Mattel/Toys "R" Us/Play Along Toys/Jakks Pacific/Wicked Cool Toys	Direct-to-video
Cabbage Patch Kids: Saturday Night	1998	Cabbage Patch Kids	Coleco/Hasbro/Mattel/Toys "R" Us/Play Along Toys/Jakks Pacific/Wicked Cool Toys	Direct-to-video
Cabbage Patch Kids: Vernon's Christmas	1999	Cabbage Patch Kids	Coleco/Hasbro/Mattel/Toys "R" Us/Play Along Toys/Jakks Pacific/Wicked Cool Toys	Direct-to-video
Candy Land: The Great Lollipop Adventure	2005	Candy Land	Milton Bradley/Hasbro	Direct-to-video
The Care Bears Movie	1985	Care Bears	American Greetings/Kenner	Theatrical release
Care Bears Movie II: A New Generation	1986	Care Bears	American Greetings/Kenner	Theatrical release
The Care Bears Adventure in Wonderland	1987	Care Bears	American Greetings/Kenner	Theatrical release
Care Bears Nutcracker Suite	1988	Care Bears	American Greetings/Kenner	Television film
Care Bears: Journey to Joke-a-lot	2004	Care Bears	American Greetings/Kenner	Direct-to-video
The Care Bears' Big Wish Movie	2005	Care Bears	American Greetings/Kenner	Direct-to-video
Care Bears: Oopsy Does It!	2007	Care Bears	American Greetings/Kenner	Theatrical release
Care Bears: Share Bear Shines	2010	Care Bears	American Greetings/Kenner	Direct-to-video
Care Bears: The Giving Festival	2010	Care Bears	American Greetings/Kenner	Direct-to-video
Care Bears: To the Rescue	2010	Care Bears	American Greetings/Kenner	Theatrical release
Care Bears: A Belly Badge for Wonderheart	2013	Care Bears	American Greetings/Kenner	Direct-to-video
Enchantimals: Finding Home	2017	Enchantimals	Mattel	Television film
Ever After High: Spring Unsprung	2015	Ever After High	Mattel	Streaming service release
G.I. Joe: The Movie	1987	G.I. Joe	Hasbro	Direct-to-video
G.I. Joe: Spy Troops	2003	G.I. Joe	Hasbro	Direct-to-video
G.I. Joe: Valor vs. Venom	2004	G.I. Joe	Hasbro	Direct-to-video
G.I. Joe: Ninja Battles	2004	G.I. Joe	Hasbro	Direct-to-video
GoBots: Battle of the Rock Lords	1986	GoBots	Tonka/Hasbro	Theatrical release
Hero Factory: Rise of the Rookies	2010	Hero Factory	The Lego Group	Video release of Hero Factory episodes as a single film.
Hero Factory: Savage Planet	2011	Hero Factory	The Lego Group	Video release of Hero Factory episodes as a single film.
The Magic of Herself the Elf	1983	Herself the Elf	American Greetings/Mattel	Television film
Holly Hobbie and Friends: Surprise Party	2005	Holly Hobbie	Tomy/Knickerbocker Toys/American Greetings	Direct-to-video
Holly Hobbie and Friends: Christmas Wishes	2006	Holly Hobbie	Tomy/Knickerbocker Toys/American Greetings	Direct-to-video
Holly Hobbie and Friends: Secret Adventures	2007	Holly Hobbie	Tomy/Knickerbocker Toys/American Greetings	Direct-to-video
Holly Hobbie and Friends: Best Friends Forever	2007	Holly Hobbie	Tomy/Knickerbocker Toys/American Greetings	Direct-to-video
Holly Hobbie and Friends: Fabulous Fashion Show	2008	Holly Hobbie	Tomy/Knickerbocker Toys/American Greetings	Direct-to-video
Holly Hobbie and Friends: Marvelous Makeover	2009	Holly Hobbie	Tomy/Knickerbocker Toys/American Greetings	Direct-to-video
Hot Wheels: World Race	2003	Hot Wheels	Mattel	Direct-to-video
Hot Wheels AcceleRacers: Ignition	2005	Hot Wheels	Mattel	Direct-to-video
Hot Wheels AcceleRacers: Speed of Silence	2005	Hot Wheels	Mattel	Direct-to-video
Hot Wheels AcceleRacers: Breaking Point	2005	Hot Wheels	Mattel	Direct-to-video
Hot Wheels AcceleRacers: The Ultimate Race	2005	Hot Wheels	Mattel	Direct-to-video
Team Hot Wheels: The Origin of Awesome!	2014	Hot Wheels	Mattel	Direct-to-video
Team Hot Wheels: The Skills to Thrill!	2014	Hot Wheels	Mattel	Direct-to-video
Team Hot Wheels: Build the Epic Race!	2014	Hot Wheels	Mattel	Direct-to-video
Team Hot Wheels: Search for the 5th Driver!	2014	Hot Wheels	Mattel	Direct-to-video
Lego: The Adventures of Clutch Powers	2010	Lego	The Lego Group	Direct-to-video
Lego Batman: The Movie - DC Super Heroes Unite	2013	Lego	The Lego Group	Direct-to-video
The Lego Movie	2014	Lego	The Lego Group	Theatrical release
Lego Friends: Girlz 4 Life	2015	Lego	The Lego Group	Direct-to-video
Lego DC Comics Super Heroes: Justice League vs. Bizarro League	2015	Lego	The Lego Group	Direct-to-video
Lego DC Comics Super Heroes: Justice League – Attack of the Legion of Doom	2015	Lego	The Lego Group	Direct-to-video
Lego DC Comics Super Heroes: Justice League – Cosmic Clash	2016	Lego	The Lego Group	Direct-to-video
Lego Scooby-Doo! Haunted Hollywood	2016	Lego	The Lego Group	Direct-to-video
Lego DC Comics Super Heroes: Justice League – Gotham City Breakout	2016	Lego	The Lego Group	Direct-to-video
Lego Scooby-Doo! Blowout Beach Bash	2017	Lego	The Lego Group	Direct-to-video
Lego DC Super Hero Girls: Brain Drain	2017	Lego	The Lego Group	Direct-to-video
The Lego Batman Movie	2017	Lego	The Lego Group	Theatrical release
The Lego Ninjago Movie	2017	Lego	The Lego Group	Theatrical release
Lego DC Comics Super Heroes: The Flash	2018	Lego	The Lego Group	Direct-to-video
Lego DC Super Hero Girls: Super-Villain High	2018	Lego	The Lego Group	Direct-to-video
Lego DC Comics Super Heroes: Aquaman – Rage of Atlantis	2018	Lego	The Lego Group	Direct-to-video
The Lego Movie 2: The Second Part	2019	Lego	The Lego Group	Theatrical release
Lego DC Batman: Family Matters	2019	Lego	The Lego Group	Direct-to-video
Lego DC Shazam! Magic and Monsters	2020	Lego	The Lego Group	Direct-to-video
Piece by Piece	2024	Lego	The Lego Group	Theatrical release
Lionel Lionelville Destination: Adventure	2009	Lionel Trains	Lionel	Direct-to-video
The Secret of the Sword	1985	Masters of the Universe	Mattel	Theatrical release
Max Steel: Endangered Species	2004	Max Steel	Mattel	Direct-to-video
Max Steel: Forces of Nature	2005	Max Steel	Mattel	Direct-to-video
Max Steel: Countdown	2006	Max Steel	Mattel	Direct-to-video
Max Steel: Dark Rival	2007	Max Steel	Mattel	Direct-to-video
Max Steel: Bio Crisis	2008	Max Steel	Mattel	Direct-to-video
Max Steel vs. The Mutant Menance	2009	Max Steel	Mattel	Direct-to-video
Max Steel vs. The Toxic Legion	2010	Max Steel	Mattel	Direct-to-video
Dragons: Fire and Ice	2004	Mega Bloks	Mega Brands	Direct-to-video
Dragons II: The Metal Ages	2005	Mega Bloks	Mega Brands	Television film
Bakusō Kyōdai Let's & Go!! WGP: Bousou Mini 4WD Dai Tsuiseki	1997	Mini4WD	Tamiya	Theatrical release
Monster High: New Ghoul at School	2010	Monster High	Mattel	Television special
Monster High: Fright On!	2011	Monster High	Mattel	Television film
Monster High: Why Do Ghouls Fall in Love?	2012	Monster High	Mattel	Television film
Monster High: Ghouls Rule	2012	Monster High	Mattel	Television film
Monster High: Escape from Skull Shores	2013	Monster High	Mattel	Television film
Monster High: Friday Night Frights	2013	Monster High	Mattel	Television film
Monster High: 13 Wishes	2013	Monster High	Mattel	Television film
Monster High: Scaris: City of Frights	2013	Monster High	Mattel	Television film
Monster High: Frights, Camera, Action!	2014	Monster High	Mattel	Television film
Monster High: Freaky Fusion	2014	Monster High	Mattel	Television film
Monster High: Haunted	2015	Monster High	Mattel	Television film
Monster High: Boo York, Boo York	2015	Monster High	Mattel	Television film
Monster High: Great Scarrier Reef	2016	Monster High	Mattel	Television film
Welcome to Monster High	2016	Monster High	Mattel	Television film
Monster High: Electrified	2017	Monster High	Mattel	Television film
Monster High: Happy Howlidays, Ghouls	2017	Monster High	Mattel	Television film
My Little Pony: The Movie	1986	My Little Pony	Hasbro	Theatrical release
My Little Pony: A Very Minty Christmas	2005	My Little Pony	Hasbro	Direct-to-video
My Little Pony: The Princess Promenade	2006	My Little Pony	Hasbro	Direct-to-video
My Little Pony Crystal Princess: The Runaway Rainbow	2006	My Little Pony	Hasbro	Direct-to-video
My Little Pony: A Very Pony Place	2007	My Little Pony	Hasbro	Direct-to-video
My Little Pony: Twinkle Wish Adventure	2009	My Little Pony	Hasbro	Direct-to-video
My Little Pony: Equestria Girls	2013	My Little Pony	Hasbro	Limited theatrical release
My Little Pony: Equestria Girls – Rainbow Rocks	2014	My Little Pony	Hasbro	Limited theatrical release
My Little Pony: Equestria Girls – Friendship Games	2015	My Little Pony	Hasbro	Limited theatrical release (outside of United States and Canada) / Television film
My Little Pony: Equestria Girls – Legend of Everfree	2016	My Little Pony	Hasbro	Television film
My Little Pony: The Movie	2017	My Little Pony	Hasbro	Theatrical release
My Little Pony: A New Generation	2021	My Little Pony	Hasbro	Streaming service release
My Scene: Jammin' in Jamaica	2004	My Scene	Mattel	Direct-to-video
My Scene: Masquerade Madness	2004	My Scene	Mattel	Direct-to-video
My Scene Goes Hollywood: The Movie	2005	My Scene	Mattel	Direct-to-video
Playmobil: The Secret of Pirate Island	2009	Playmobil	Brandstätter Group	Direct-to-video
Playmobil: The Movie	2019	Playmobil	Brandstätter Group	Theatrical release
Polly Pocket: Lunar Eclipse	2004	Polly Pocket	Bluebird Toys/Mattel	Direct-to-video
Polly Pocket: 2 Cool at the Pocket Plaza	2005	Polly Pocket	Bluebird Toys/Mattel	Direct-to-video
PollyWorld	2006	Polly Pocket	Bluebird Toys/Mattel	Direct-to-video
Pound Puppies	1985	Pound Puppies	Tonka/Hasbro	Television film
Pound Puppies and the Legend of Big Paw	1988	Pound Puppies	Tonka/Hasbro	Theatrical release
The Secret of the Sword	1985	Princess of Power	Mattel	Theatrical release
Raggedy Ann & Andy: A Musical Adventure	1977	Raggedy Ann	Hasbro	Theatrical release
Rainbow Brite and the Star Stealer	1985	Rainbow Brite	Hallmark Cards/Mattel	Theatrical release
Rescue Heroes: The Movie	2003	Rescue Heroes	Fisher-Price	Direct-to-video
Robotix: The Movie	1987	Robotix	Milton Bradley/Hasbro	Televised shorts compiled into a film.
Shopkins: Chef Club	2016	Shopkins	Moose Toys	Direct-to-video
Shopkins: World Vacation	2017	Shopkins	Moose Toys	Direct-to-video
Shopkins: Wild	2018	Shopkins	Moose Toys	Direct-to-video
Star Fairies	1985	Star Fairies	Tonka/Hasbro	Television film
Strawberry Shortcake: The Sweet Dreams Movie	2006	Strawberry Shortcake	American Greetings/Kenner/Playmates Toys/Hasbro	Theatrical release
Strawberry Shortcake: Berry Blossom Festival	2007	Strawberry Shortcake	American Greetings/Kenner/Playmates Toys/Hasbro	Theatrical release
Strawberry Shortcake: Let's Dance	2007	Strawberry Shortcake	American Greetings/Kenner/Playmates Toys/Hasbro	Theatrical release
Strawberry Shortcake: Rockaberry Roll	2008	Strawberry Shortcake	American Greetings/Kenner/Playmates Toys/Hasbro	Direct-to-video
The Strawberry Shortcake Movie: Sky's the Limit	2009	Strawberry Shortcake	American Greetings/Kenner/Playmates Toys/Hasbro	Direct-to-video
Strawberry Shortcake: The Glimmerberry Ball Movie	2010	Strawberry Shortcake	American Greetings/Kenner/Playmates Toys/Hasbro	Direct-to-video
Tonka Tough Truck Adventures: The Biggest Show on Wheels	2004	Tonka Trucks	Tonka/Hasbro	Direct-to-video
The Transformers: The Movie	1986	Transformers	Hasbro/Tomy	Theatrical release
Beast Wars II: Lio Convoy's Close Call!	1998	Transformers	Hasbro/Tomy	Television film (Japan only)
Transformers Prime Beast Hunters: Predacons Rising	2013	Transformers	Hasbro/Tomy	Television film
Transformers One	2024	Transformers	Hasbro/Tomy	Theatrical release
Trolls	2016	Troll Doll	Dam Things/DreamWorks Animation	Theatrical release
Trolls World Tour	2020	Troll Doll	Dam Things/DreamWorks Animation	Theatrical release
Trolls Band Together	2023	Troll Doll	Dam Things/DreamWorks Animation	Theatrical release
UglyDolls	2019	Uglydoll	Pretty Ugly/STX Entertainment	Theatrical release
Quest for Zhu	2011	ZhuZhu Pets	Cepia LLC	Direct-to-video
The Power of Zhu	2024	ZhuZhu Pets	Cepia LLC	Direct-to-video
Secret of Zhu	2024	ZhuZhu Pets	Cepia LLC	Direct-to-video
Journey to Glo-E	2024	GloE	Cepia LLC	Direct-to-video

== See also ==
- American Girl (film series)
- List of Barbie films
- G.I. Joe (film series)
- List of Lego films and TV series
- My Little Pony: Equestria Girls
- Transformers (film series)
- List of films based on Hasbro properties
- List of television programs based on Hasbro properties
- List of films based on comics
- List of films based on comic strips
- List of films based on video games
