= Max Steel (disambiguation) =

Max Steel is a Mattel toy line.

Max Steel may also refer to:

- Max Steel (2000 TV series), an animated TV series
- Max Steel (2013 TV series), an animated TV series
- Max Steel (film), a 2016 live-action superhero film
- Max Steel: Covert Missions, a video game
- Max Steel: Endangered Species, a 2004 direct-to-DVD film
- Max Steel: Forces of Nature, a 2005 direct-to-DVD film
- Max Steel: Dark Rival, a 2007 direct-to-DVD film
- Stelvio Massi (1929–2004), an Italian director sometimes credited "Max Steel"

== See also ==
- Maxx Steele, a character from the unrelated Robo Force toy line
