= Max Steel (2000 TV series) =

2000 TV series

- Genre: Action; Science fiction Superhero
- Based on: Max Steel by Mattel
- Developed by: Greg Weisman; Jeff Kline
- Starring: Christian Campbell; Ed Asner; Martin Jarvis; Chi McBride; Keith Szarabajka; Jacob Vargas; Debi Mae West
- Composers: Jim Latham; Nathan Furst
- Countries of origin: United States; Canada (S3)
- No. of seasons: 3
- No. of episodes: 35 (+ 9 films) (list of episodes)

Production
- Executive producers: Richard Raynis; Jeff Kline
- Producers: Bob Richardson; Greg Weisman; Marsha F. Griffin
- Running time: 21 minutes
- Production companies: Adelaide Productions; Columbia TriStar Television (S1–S2); Netter Digital (S1–S2); Foundation Imaging (S1–S2); Mainframe Entertainment (S3)

Original release
- Network: Kids' WB
- Release: February 26, 2000 – June 23, 2001
- Network: Cartoon Network
- Release: November 12, 2001 – December 13, 2002

Related
- Max Steel (2013); Max Steel (2016)

Max Steel is an animated television series which originally aired from February 26, 2000, to December 13, 2002, based on the Mattel action-figure of the same name. Max Steel ran for three seasons, totaling thirty-five episodes.

From 2004 to 2012, direct-to-DVD movies kept the presence of the main character alive. However, the first movie, Max Steel: Endangered Species, was the only one to keep the continuity of the series. After Endangered Species, the continuity was altered. Endangered Species was the only movie to be made available in the United States of America, while later releases were in Latin America.

The voice-acting cast for the series included Chi McBride and Christian Campbell, as well as well-known sports stars such as Tony Hawk.

After the bankruptcy of Netter Digital and Foundation Imaging, Mainframe Entertainment took over the productions of the third season and the movies. The last episode, "Truth Be Told", aired January 15, 2002. Max Steel was the first computer-generated series to air on Kids' WB.

A reboot series premiered on Disney XD in 2013.

== Premise ==
Protagonist Josh McGrath is a 19-year-old fictional extreme sports teen star, whose parents died some time ago. He was later adopted by his father's best friend and partner, Jefferson Smith, who works in an extreme sports equipment manufacturing company which is in reality a façade for a secret counter-intelligence agency known as N-Tek.

One night, while Josh was visiting his adoptive father at work, a villain known as Psycho broke into the facility. The young McGrath faced him and a brief battle ensued, interrupted when Psycho shot a nearby containment unit of semi-liquid, microscopic Nano-Tech machines called "Max Probes". The nanomachines covered Josh, entering his body, integrating with his organic system, and (as they ran out of energy) started dying, siphoning Josh's life-critical energy as well. In an attempt to save his foster son, Jefferson Smith agrees to submit Josh to a high proportion of the transphasic energy, which the machines need to survive. This saved his life and also gave him superhuman abilities. As a result, Josh took on the identity of Max Steel and fights super-powered villains, mainly Mr. Dread, Psycho's evil boss, and the members of DREAD, his spy organization. Later, in the movies, they fight off mutants, robots, mad scientists, and monsters.

== Episodes ==
Season	Episodes	Originally released		
Season	Episodes	First released	Last released	Network
1	13	February 26, 2000	October 14, 2000	Kids' WB
2	13	October 28, 2000	June 23, 2001	Kids' WB
3	9	November 12, 2001	December 13, 2002	Cartoon Network

Max Steel debuted on Kids' WB with the episode "Strangers" on February 26, 2000, and ended with episode "Truth Be Told" on December 13, 2002. The show ran for three seasons, totaling 35 episodes.

The series can be found on DVD: Volume one contains episodes 1–6, Volume 2 contains episodes 7–13, and the final one is a box-set with all of season one. Seasons 2 and 3 were never released. VHS ones were made available with various "Max Steel" action figures: "Strangers," "Snow Blind," "Sphinxes," and "Old Friend, New Enemy" were sold.

As of 2009, episodes of Max Steel can be found on Crackle's YouTube account; however, these are no longer accessible.

== Characters ==
=== N-Tek and civilians ===
- Josh McGrath/Max Steel (voiced by Christian Campbell from 2000–2002, Matthew Kaminsky in two episodes in 2001) – As Josh McGrath, he is a college student and an extreme sports star, working for his adoptive father Jefferson Smith of N-Tek, which supplies such equipment. He later discovers that N-Tek is a front for a secret anti-terrorist organization. In the course of this discovery, he suffered an accident when he was doused with nanoprobes while battling Psycho. These probes give him enhanced physical abilities, including superhuman strength and speed, and the ability to become invisible. However, he requires periodic doses of transphasic energy to survive or the probes will essentially starve to death and kill him. In Max Steel: Countdown, Max would gain new nanoprobes, and a new system, Adrenalink, the more thrill Max did, the more power he would have, when he reached 100%, he enter Maximum Steel mode. Max would gain another upgrade in Max Steel vs the Mutant Menace. When Max went turbo, any N-Tek equipment he has on him would get upgraded, either in power, or allows the gear to have an alternate mode. Max's original Bio-Link acted as a com-link, and monitored his turbo energy. It could also activate different clothes for Max for different environments. In The Mutant Menace, the original Bio-Link is replaced with a smaller, portable version.
- Molly McGrath – Josh's mother died in a shipwreck when he was young. Max is haunted by her death, and, despite being only a toddler when she died, blames himself for her death.
- Jefferson Smith (voiced by Chi McBride from 2000 to 2002, Scott McNeil in Endangered Species) – The CEO of N-Tek, both the sports and spy sides. He inherited this position from Marco Nathanson, the previous and first CEO of N-Tek. Jefferson is the adoptive father of Max after his father died. Being an international counter-terrorism agency, N-Tek answers to the UN and includes a number of other non-US citizens on its staff. When Josh was doused with nanoprobes during Psycho's attack, Jefferson saved his life by putting him through a procedure that involved transphasic energy. He voices his displeasure when Max is put in harm's way, but ultimately lets him go, knowing that Max is stronger than any human, and will be able to defeat enemies more easily than others. His relationship with Max is strained, but the two ultimately make amends.
- Dr. Roberto Martinez (voiced by Jacob Vargas from 2000 to 2002, Alessandro Juliani in Endangered Species) – A technical genius in his late teen years. Best known as 'Berto (a diminutive of his name), he is the main expert on Nano-Tek Max, the microscopic machines which gave Max Steel his superhuman abilities. Berto is usually based at the HQ of the secret intelligence service N-Tek where he monitors Max's missions via a computer screen, but he also often takes a more active part in the missions himself.
- Rachel Leeds (voiced by Shannon Kenny) – Max's first partner at N-Tek. Much of season 1 focused on her relationship with Max: from one of constant squabbling to increasing attraction on his part, which affected Josh's relationship with his girlfriend Laura Chen. She can normally handle herself in a fight even against multiple opponents bare handed, hence the reason why she was assigned to train and tutor Max as a new N-Tek Agent.
- Kat Ryan (voiced by Debi Mae West from 2000 to 2002, Meghan Black in Endangered Species) – After Rachel's promotion in season two, Kat, another of her protégés, became Max's new partner. At first they did not get along, but, after Jefferson Smith forced them to work together, they developed a little mutual respect. About the same age as Josh and Roberto, her relationship with the two boys is like that of a sister, much like how Josh and 'Berto see each other as brothers. Late in the series, it is revealed that Kat was once part of a street gang and served time in a juvenile detention center.
- Laura Chen and Pete Costas (respectively voiced by Lauren Tom and Thomas F. Wilson) – Two of Josh's college friends, Pete referring to themselves as the "Three Musketeers" given that they used to be very close, until Josh's life as Max Steel started to interfere. Laura Chen was Josh's girlfriend but she soon broke up with him due in part to his increasingly close relationship with Rachel Leeds. He also kept his activities as Max Steel a secret from her and this would affect dates and other commitments which made him somewhat unreliable. Pete, in the season two premiere, found out about Josh's dual identity after being captured by John Dread and agreed to keep it secret. Yet he hitchhiked with him on one mission in Alaska once. He was not seen in season 3.
- Jean Mairot (voiced by Keith Szarabajka) – Smith's second-in-command at N-Tek in season one and head of operations, briefing agents on their missions and coordinating their progress. A soft-spoken man, he is cool and calculating and a good judge of character — putting Max in charge of a major rescue operation even though the boy himself did not feel up to it. At the end of season one, Mairot was revealed to be a spy working for John Dread.
- Charles "Chuck" Marshak (voiced by Edward Asner) – An N-Tek division chief who's in charge of Behemoth, a flying fortress used as a mobile base.
- Jake Nez (voiced by Gregg Rainwater) – An N-Tek agent and astronaut, formerly from NASA. He was also once a love interest of Rachel's but was dumped by her when she started training Max. He does not come across as the jealous type, ably assisting Max and Rachel on missions.
- Cytro - Cytro was originally an enemy robot created by Doctor Rendal in Max Steel: Bio Crisis, who was designed to kill Max. But over the course of the film Cytro grew to like Max, and sacrificed himself to save Max. Berto was able to rebuild Cytro, as his memory core was still intact, and became the fourth and newest member of Team Steel.
- Forge Ferris - Forge replaced Jefferson as the leader of N-Tek during Max Steel vs The Mutant Menace. While he is strict, he also encourages Max not to give up, and gives him advice. He keeps Max on a need to know basis, but when Max does need to know, he always tells him.
- Jet Ferris - Jet is the daughter of Forge Ferris, who debuted in Max Steel: Monstrous Alliance. Jet was described by Forge as a constant source of disappointment, as Jet keeps getting demerits, and keeps being unable to graduate. Jet originally planned on killing Toxion to try and make her father proud, but after her adventure with Max and Cytro, which she secretly sneaks into, she takes Toxion be to the N-Tek lab in the North Pole, and is able to cure him, finally earning her father's respect.

=== DREAD ===
- John Dread (voiced by Martin Jarvis) – The leader of the DREAD organization and the main antagonist of the first and second seasons (even after his supposed death). He's rarely seen outside of offices and rooms in dark secluded buildings, and only made two known appearances where he was the main or part of a main threat. He was killed in the season 1 finale (S1E13 – "Shattered") when his airship crashes, but he survived in the season 2 premiere (S2E1 – "The Return"). He takes Pete Costas hostage and forces Max to steal valuable N-Tek research. He's later arrested and held in a maximum security prison. During the season 2 finale (S2E13 – "Breakout"), Psycho and Bio-Con break him out while he is being transferred to another prison.
- Psycho (voiced by Keith Szarabajka, Brian Drummond in Endangered Species) – A member of DREAD who has a metallic, skull-like face. His main weapon is his right bionic arm, which can change into a claw or a laser gun.
- L'Etranger (voiced by John de Lancie) – A mercenary terrorist with strength that rivals Max's in turbo-mode and armed with electrical charged gloves which can produce an explosive spark. Being an electrical weapon, one hit is more than enough to stun his enemies for a large period of time.
- Dragonelle (voiced by Mia Korf) – A member of DREAD who sports golden battle armor and can perfectly mimic the actions and appearance of any person she has seen. She's not much of a fighter, as she always runs away from any physical confrontation, since she's more an undercover agent than an active fighter.
- Vitriol – According to Max, Vitriol is "not the sharpest tool in the shed," which explains why he often teams along with Psycho. While they are supposed to be equal members of DREAD, Vitriol usually follows Psycho's orders. His arms are vibrant, translucent green with metallic 'bones' visible, and can shoot green energy beams.

=== Other villains ===
- Woody Barkowski and Annabelle Barkowski/Electrix (voiced by Jeff Bennett and Susan Eisenberg respectively) – Two siblings who are intent on bringing down N-Tek: Woody believes that they gave him a faulty mountain bike to cause him to break his leg and thus retire from the extreme sports world. Annabelle collaborates with her brother in the first season and seeks revenge for her brother in the second season. In season two, Annabelle suffers an accident in her laboratory and her body is never found. It is later revealed that Annabelle's body uses electrical currents and sources as an energy supply, much like how the nanoprobes in Max's body uses transphasic energy.
- Chang – Chang is an expert in martial arts and leader of the Chinese Cyber Dragon Tong.
- Lance Breamer – He considers himself the "King of the sky." Angered by those who feel his ideas are too expensive or too impractical, Breamer creates a massive airplane called, "The Javelin." Breamer uses this to steal aircraft out of the sky, using fog exhibitors to conceal the plane, and knockout gas to wipe out a part of the pilot's short-term memory.
- Hernando Carreras – The leader of the so-called pirates in Baja. He has a mechanical eye under his eyepatch which can shoot lasers.
- Clark Ashworth – Ashworth is an egotistical, megalomaniac who takes his former coworkers hostage after he is fired from his job in Washington, D.C. While holding them hostage, he steals his "prized creation": The Disruptor. The Disruptor has the equivalent of 50 sticks of dynamite each time it is fired, as well as unlimited firing capabilities.
- Bio-Con (voiced by René Auberjonois in most appearances, Scott McNeil in Endangered Species) – His full name is Bio-Constrictor and short for "Biologically Altered Constricting Serpent", having been given this name by 'Berto. Dr. David Klimo was once an N-Tek scientist who was fired for erratic behavior, mainly using venomous animals as weapons. He was involved in an accident where he fell into a vat of electrified snake venom, mutating him into a reptilian form with the ability to fully transform into a snake and transform others into reptilian forms via his venom Towards the end of Endangered Species, Psycho betrays him and kills him with a self-destructing android.
- Bret Grimsley – Grimsley is the sports manager for athletes Brian Durham and Danny Preston. Grimsley uses Brian and Danny to steal high-end computer chips, promising they'll be the best. The computer chips, when attached to the head of a person, can push their body to the extreme.
- Dexter – A scientist. Years ago, Dexter and Dr. Montgomery both worked on a similar structural designs and the government chose Dr. Montgomery's design instead of his. So he kidnapped and brainwashed Scott (Garret) to kill Montgomery and destroy his reputation. Max and Kat manage to stop him and arrest him.
- Serge De La Rouge (voiced by Charles Shaughnessy) – Serge is a car racer who holds a grudge against athlete Jeremy McGrath because he lost to him in the last Sahara Race: a race across the Sahara Desert where any type of vehicle goes. Serge plants a bomb in his own car, kidnaps Jeremy during the race, and attempts to kill Jeremy as well as the judges who overruled his protests that the last part of the race favored super cross bikers. Max, Kat, and 'Berto manage to stop and arrest Serge before anyone is harmed.
- Richard Shine – Shine is a sports park owner and is extremely obsessed with Kat. He attempts to destroy his own sports park to make millions, and later kidnaps Kat after she is injured in an explosion he caused. Max is almost blown up by one of Shine's bombs in an apartment, but Max escapes with the bomb and tosses it into the ocean before it goes off. Max and 'Berto track down one of Shine's mansions, and rescue Kat. Shine attempts to stop them with his henchmen, but they are all taken down and arrested.

=== Movie villains ===
- Elementor (voiced by Scott McNeil) – Elementor is a clone of Bio-Con who first appeared in Max Steel: Forces of Nature, created upon coming in contact with one of the five Elementium Isotopes which gave him the ability to control water sometime after Bio-Con's death. He later found and absorbed 3 that had been scattered around the world, giving him control over earth, fire and air, and the ability to absorb other materials.
- Extroyer (voiced by Brian Drummond) – Originally known as Troy Winters and debuted in Max Steel: Dark Rival, Troy was Max's rival on the Extreme Sports Circuit and the only guy Max could not beat. Troy left to work for Eclipse Industries, as the Circuit could not provide the challenge Troy wanted. He stole three Proton Magnets from N-Tek, and used them to shoot down crystal pieces from a comet called Morphosos. Troy fell into a pool of lava, and merged the Morphosos Crystal he had on him, transforming him into the energy-draining villain Extroyer.
- Dr. Grigor Rendal - A mad scientist who was the main antagonist of Max Steel: Bio Crisis. He was the one who freed and mind-controlled Elementor and created a clone of Exstroyer from Troy Winters' DNA sample.
  - Extroyer II - A clone of Troy Winters who was created by Dr. Rendal from Troy's DNA sample that were on the Exstroyer body fragments. This gave the clone the powers and memories of the original Extroyer.
- Toxzon – Originally an N-Tek agent known as Titus "Tox" Octavius Zander who debuted in Max Steel vs The Mutant Menace. He had a problem with authority and tried to bring an N-Tek waste containment plant, that he created in order to hold the world's most dangerous substances, online before it was ready. The result was an explosion that mutated Tox's body and gave him control over toxins, and other dangerous chemicals. It also mutated Toxion's mind, causing him to go crazy, and blamed N-Tek for what happened to him. Before Toxion grew too powerful however, he was placed in a containment Sphere of ultra purified water, and sent to the North Pole until a cure could be found. Toxion tricked Max into freeing him and proceeded to strengthen himself. He then tried to absorb the substances from the containment plant, and was stopped by Max. In Max Steel: Monstrous Alliance, Toxion tried to take over a new N-Tek ship called the Warden. At the end of the film he was cured by Forge Ferris's daughter Jet.
- Makino – Originally known as a news reporter named Mike Nickelson, he debuted in Makino's Revenge. Nickelson stole Berto's equipment in order to try and record a fight between Max and Lightning Elementor, he was hit by a substance that fused him and Berto's equipment transforming him into Makino. He used his new powers to make Max and N-Tek look like criminals, and promote himself as a hero. But Makino's deception was revealed, and lost his fame and credibility where he was defeated by Max and arrested by the authorities. Makino has the power to control all technology, he can also change his body be absorbing different vehicles such as a tank or jet fighter. In Max Steel: Monstrous Alliance, Makino would later collaborate with Toxzon. He was defeated by Max and Jet.

== Voice cast ==
=== Main voice cast ===
- Edward Asner – Charles "Chuck" Marshak (2000)
- Christian Campbell – Max Steel/Josh McGrath (2000–2001)
- Martin Jarvis – John Dread
- Matthew Kaminsky – Max Steel/Josh McGrath (2001, episodes "Prey" and "Fan Appreciation")
- Shannon Kenny – Rachel Leeds (2000)
- Mia Korf – Dragonelle (2000)
- John de Lancie – L'Etranger
- Chi McBride – Jefferson Smith
- Keith Szarabajka – Jean Mairot, Psycho
- Jacob Vargas – Dr. Roberto Martinez
- Debi Mae West – Kat Ryan (2001 - 2002)

=== Additional voices ===
- Thom Adcox-Hernandez
- Carlos Alazraqui
- Edward Albert
- René Auberjonois - Bio-Con/Dr. David Klimo
- Obba Babatundé
- Jeff Bennett – Woody Barkowski, additional voices
- Susan Eisenberg – Annabelle Barkowski/Electrix
- Earl Boen
- Robert Cait
- Cam Clarke
- Steve Blum
- Jesse Corti
- Jim Cummings
- Candi Milo
- David DeLuise
- Tate Donovan
- Jessica Gee
- Jean Gilpin
- Michael Gough – Grimsley
- Tony Hawk – Himself
- Matt Hoffman – Himself
- Sherman Howard
- Charity James
- Dublin James
- Tony Jay
- Clyde Kusatsu
- Joe Lala
- Jason Marsden – Joseph Guerard
- Jeremy McGrath – Himself
- Candi Milo
- Yuji Okumoto
- August Paro
- Gregg Rainwater – Jake Nez
- Kevin Michael Richardson
- Mark Rolston
- Rino Romano
- Pete Sepenuk
- Charles Shaughnessy - Serge De La Rouge
- James Sie
- Tony Pope
- Cynthia Songé
- Tara Strong
- Michael T. Weiss

== Crew ==
- Susan Blu – Dialogue Director
- Bob Richardson – Producer, Supervising Director

== Series ending and continuity ==
After the official ending of the original series, due to the success of the action figure in Latin America, but the lack of response from United States market, Mattel removed Max Steel from the American market and focused on foreign markets only. As a result, after two years of absence, in partnership with Mattel, Sony Family Pictures Entertainment and Mainframe Entertainment (now Rainmaker Animation) continued with the animated adventures of Max Steel as a series of Direct to DVD movies and a collection of 1 minute video clips. Each movie or clip usually presents Max challenging one of his enemies, and was used initially as a way to keep the presence of Max on TV, but eventually became a way to promote a series of new toys.

After their initial release on TV, the movies were included as bonus gifts in many Max Steel toys or rewards for other activities related to the toy series. Most of the TV ads were grouped under the name of Turbo Missions.

== Reboot ==
In January 2012, it was reported Mattel and Freemantle Media were working on a new television series and reboot of the Max Steel television series, which will still retain the name, but feature different characters, villains, and an entirely new storyline. This time, the show follows a 16-year-old Tachyon-human hybrid named Maxwell "Max" McGrath and his alien "Ultralink" partner, Steel. Maxwell McGrath learns he has the power to generate "TURBO energy", which he struggles to contain until meeting Steel. Steel gives Maxwell the ability to harness his power while merging his own to create one unified super force. The action adventure series was launched on March 1, 2013, to audiences on Cartoon Network channels throughout Latin America, including Mexico, Brazil, Peru and Argentina. On October 5, 2012, it was confirmed that the series will air on Disney XD in the United States. Max Steel premiered Monday, March 25, 2013.
