= Max Steel: Covert Missions =

2000 video game

- Developer: Treyarch
- Publisher: Mattel Interactive
- Platform: Dreamcast
- Release: NA: December 5, 2000
- Genres: Action, First-person shooter
- Mode: Single-player

Max Steel: Covert Missions (also simply known as Max Steel) is a video game developed by Treyarch and published by Mattel Interactive, based on the television series and action figure of the same name. It was released for the Dreamcast exclusively in North America on December 5, 2000. A version planned for the Game Boy Color was cancelled.

As with the TV series, Christian Campbell voiced Max Steel.

== Plot ==
Infused with superhuman powers and nano-technology, Max Steel battles the evil forces of D.R.E.A.D and his evil cyborg nemesis Psycho. Now, armed with a fierce new bio-weapon, D.R.E.A.D plans to ravage and take over the world.

== Reception ==
Reception

Aggregate score
Aggregator	Score
Metacritic	56/100

Review scores
Publication	Score
AllGame	2/5
Electronic Gaming Monthly	6.5/10
IGN	3.7/10
Jeuxvideo.com	9/20
Next Generation	3/5

The game received "mixed" reviews according to the review aggregation website Metacritic. Jeremy Dunham of IGN said, "Max Steel is easily one of the most disappointing games of the year!" and "Max Steel should be at the bottom of everyone's wish lists (or steel-toed boots, whichever you prefer)." Luke Barnes of AllGame said, "Regrettably, Max Steel completely misses the mark when it comes to the simple concept of "enjoyment."" On a positive note, he praised the game's graphics and soundtrack. Kevin Rice of NextGen said of the game, "While it's definitely fun and there's very little to complain about, it's all got a passé feel. It's fast-paced and it looks good, but it's nothing that hasn't been done before."
