= Michael Donovan =

Canadian voice actor and director (1953–2026)

- Born: Michael David Donovan; June 12, 1953; Vancouver, British Columbia, Canada
- Died: March 4, 2026 (aged 72)
- Occupations: Voice actor; voice director; casting director
- Years active: 1983–2023

Michael David Donovan (June 12, 1953 – March 4, 2026) was a Canadian voice actor and director.

== Career ==
Donovan had an extensive voiceover career in both western and Japanese animation. His voice roles include Wes Weasley in Adventures of Sonic the Hedgehog, Guile and Zangief in Street Fighter, Eggplant Wizard in Captain N: The Game Master, and Sabretooth in X-Men: Evolution. His anime roles include Master Roshi in Dragon Ball, Ryoga Hibiki in Ranma ½, and Cye Mouri and Sage Date in Ronin Warriors.

== Death ==
Donovan died on March 4, 2026, at the age of 72.

== Filmography ==
=== Television ===
Year	Title	Role	Notes
1989–1990	Camp Candy	Various voices	16 episodes
1989–1991	Captain N: The Game Master	Eggplant Wizard, various voices	
1990	Heroes on Hot Wheels	Michael Valiant, Quincy, Fox	2 episodes
1991	The New Adventures of He-Man	General Nifel	5 episodes
1992	The Adventures of T-Rex	Professor Edison, Shooter, Big Dinosaur	Episode: "Hijack"
1992–1993	Conan the Adventurer	Conan	Main role (65 episodes)
1992–1993	King Arthur and the Knights of Justice	Darren, Lug	26 episodes
1993	Adventures of Sonic the Hedgehog	Wes Weasely, additional voices	
1993–1994	Exosquad	Wolf Bronski	11 episodes
1993–1994	The Bots Master	GeneSix, Cook	40 episodes
1994	Conan and the Young Warriors	Graak	13 episodes
1994–2001	ReBoot	Phong, Mike the TV, Cecil, Al, various guest characters	47 episodes
1994–1995	Mega Man	Uncle Jet	1 episode
1995	The Adventures of Captain Zoom in Outer Space	Narrator	Television film
1995–1996	Skysurfer Strike Force	Jack Hollister	13 episodes
1995–1997	Street Fighter	Guile, Zangief	26 episodes
1996	Cybill	Burglar Alarm	Episode: "Cybill, Get Your Gun"
1996	The Sylvester & Tweety Mysteries	Alien	Episode: "Spaced Out"
1996	Hey Arnold!	Maria's Dad, Cabby	Episode: "6th Grade Girls"
1996–2001	Billy the Cat	Mr. Hubert, Ali Kazam	
1997	The New Batman Adventures	Gun Runner	Episode: "You Scratch My Back"
1997	The Incredible Hulk	Joe Fixit	5 episodes
1997–1998	Superman: The Animated Series	News Anchor, Male Announcer	3 episodes
1998	Pinky and the Brain	Maitre'D	Episode: "Brain's Night Off"
1998–1999	The Secret Files of the Spy Dogs	Stahl	3 episodes
1999	Rugrats	Evil Scientist, Jim Hashimoto	Episode: "Runaway Reptar"
1999	The Chimp Channel	Bif, additional voices	
1999	The Magician	Ace Cooper	21 episodes
1999–2001	Spider-Man Unlimited	Carnage	7 episodes
1999–2005	Jay Jay the Jet Plane	Narrator, Jake, Oscar	
2000	Adventures from the Book of Virtues	Socrates	13 episodes (season 3)
2000–2003	X-Men: Evolution	Sabretooth	13 episodes
2002–2004	He-Man and the Masters of the Universe	Hordak, Randor, Roboto, additional voices	
2002–2005	¡Mucha Lucha!	El Rey, Megawatt, El Haystack Grande, Old Man	
2004	The Cramp Twins	Manager	Episode: "Slave Mart"
2004–2005	Martin Mystery	Gerard Mystery	2 episodes
2005–2006	Coconut Fred's Fruit Salad Island!	Various voices	13 episodes
2006–2008	Tom and Jerry Tales	Spike, Droopy, additional voices	
2007–2008	3-2-1 Penguins!	Kevin	Main cast (seasons 2-3)
2007–2008	Edgar & Ellen	Various voices	
2008	Class of the Titans	Pirithoüs	Episode: "Recipe for Disaster"
2012	Action Dad	Chuck Ramsey, various voices	Main cast
2012	Handy Manny	Hank	Episode: "Hank's Birthday"
2012	Winx Club	Rick	Episode: "Love & Pet"
2013–2014	Lego Star Wars: The Yoda Chronicles	Count Dooku, Ben Kenobi, additional voices	
2013–2014	Xiaolin Chronicles	Dojo Kanojo Cho, Master Fung, Eon	
2013–2021	Superbook	Various voices	
2014	The Legend of Korra	Mayor	Episode: "Rebirth"
2015	Lego Star Wars: Droid Tales	Count Dooku, Owen Lars, various voices	
2015–2022	Ninjago	Various voices	
2016	Lego Star Wars: The Freemaker Adventures	Obi-Wan Kenobi, various voices	
2017	OK K.O.! Let's Be Heroes	Director	2 episodes

=== Film ===
Year	Title	Role	Notes
1992	The New Adventures of Little Toot	Salty, Charlie	
1994	Leo the Lion: King of the Jungle	Narrator	Direct-to-video
1997	The Fearless Four	Heir, Host, Guard	English dub
2000	A Chinese Ghost Story: The Tsui Hark Animation	Ning	English dub
2003	¡Mucha Lucha!: The Return of El Maléfico	El Rey, Megawatt, Groom, Botas Del Fuego	
2005	Max Steel: Forces of Nature	Agent, Scientist	
2005	Hot Wheels: AcceleRacers	Peter Tezla	
2006	Max Steel: Countdown	Dr. Hershnev	
2006	PollyWorld	John Pocket, Director	Direct-to-video
2013	The Naughty List	Murkle, Elf Dad, Mechanic Elf	
2014	JLA Adventures: Trapped in Time	Bizarro	Direct-to-video
2015	Star Wars: The Force Awakens	Additional voices	

=== Video games ===
Year	Title	Role	Notes
1995	Ripley's Believe It or Not!: The Riddle of Master Lu	Various voices	
1997	Goosebumps: Attack of the Mutant	Molecule Man, Captain Bob, Penguin	
1998	ReBoot	Phong, Mike	
2003	Hulk	Joe Fixit	
2004	World of Warcraft	Xavius, Locus-Walker, various voices	
2005	The Incredible Hulk: Ultimate Destruction	Grey Hulk	
2006	Dungeons & Dragons Online	Dungeon Master	
2009	Damnation	Civilian	
2010	Cabela's Dangerous Hunts 2011	Announcer, Hiker, Scientist	
2011	Captain America: Super Soldier	Iron Cross, Allied Forces, Hydra Forces	
2011	The Elder Scrolls V: Skyrim	Kodlak Whitemane, Malacath	
2012	Guild Wars 2	Malyck	
2012	Resident Evil 6	Adam Benford	
2014	Skylanders: Trap Team	Additional voices	
2015	Final Fantasy Type-0	Provost	English dub
2015	Skylanders: SuperChargers	Additional voices	

=== Anime ===
- Dragon Ball – Master Roshi
- Dragon Ball: Curse of the Blood Rubies – Penny's father, Master Roshi
- Dragon Warrior - Adonis
- Fate/Zero – Zouken Mato, Glen McKenzie
- Harmagedon – Asanshi
- Inuyasha – Suikotsu
- Magic☆Hospital! - Dr. Kory Bodily
- Maison Ikkoku – Zenzaburo Mitsukoshi
- Marvel Anime: Iron Man – Various voices
- Mobile Suit Gundam SEED Destiny – Joachim Ruddle
- Ōban Star-Racers – Aikka's fencing instructor, additional voices
- Ranma ½ – Ryoga Hibiki, Jusenkyo Guide (Seasons 6-7)
- Ronin Warriors – Cye Mouri, Sage Date
- Transformers: Cybertron – Dirt Boss, Crosswise, Primus

== Directing and casting credits ==
- Lego Star Wars: The Freemaker Adventures – Disney / Lucasfilm / WilFilm
- Lego Nexo Knights - Lego / M2
- Lego Elves - Lego / JaFilm
- Lego Star Wars - Lego / WilFilm
- Lego Friends - Lego / M2
- Lego Ninjago: Masters of Spinjitzu – Lego/WilFilm
- Hydee and the Hytops: The Movie – SD Entertainment, Maslen Entertainment
- Ninjago – New Lego Movie – WilFilm/Feelgoodfilm, Denmark
- Superbook – 36 episodes – CBN
- Dreamkix – 26 episodes – Designstorm
- Rollbots – 26 episodes – 4 Kids/Amberwood Animation
- 321 Penguins – 26 episodes – NBC Kubo/Big Idea Productions
- A Kind of Magic – 26 episodes – Xilam Animation
- Care Bears – the Series – 26 episodes – CBS/American Greeting/SD Ent.
- Care Bears: Oopsy Does It! – Feature film – American Greeting/SD Ent.
- Care Bears: Star Glo Adventures – Feature film – American Greeting/SD Ent.
- Care Bears – 6 direct-to-video movies – American Greeting/SD Ent.
- Famous 5: On the Case – 26 episodes – Disney Channel/Marathon/Chorion
- Eon Kid – 26 episodes – Warner Brothers
- Oban Star Racers 26 episodes – Jetix/Disney/Sav Productions
- Monster Buster Club 52 episodes – Jetix/Toon Disney/Marathon
- Tom and Jerry Tales 78 episodes – Warner Brothers
- Tom and Jerry: A Nutcracker Tale – Direct-to-video movie- Warner Brothers/Turner Entertainment
- Coconut Fred's Fruit Salad Island! – 26 episodes – Warner Brothers
- Goodtimes Fairy Tales – Goodtimes Entertainment/Jetlag Productions/Carye Brothers
- Team Galaxy – 52 episodes – Marathon Animation
- Alien Racers – 52 episodes – MGA/SD Entertainment
- He-Man and the Masters of the Universe – 39 episodes – Mattel/Mike Young Productions
- Nilus the Sandman – 26 episodes – Delaney & Friends Cartoon Prod./Cambium Film & Video Productions
- Martin Mystery – 66 episodes – YTV/Marathon Animation
- ReBoot – 47 episodes – ABC/Alliance/Mainframe Entertainment
- Action Man – 26 episodes – Fox/MGM/SD Ent/Mainframe
- Make Way for Noddy – 100 episodes – Chorion Ent./SD Entertainment
- The Book of Virtues – 13 episodes – PBS/Porchlight Entertainment
- Skysurfer Strike Force – 26 episodes – Ruby Spears/Ashi Prod. Co./Bohbot
- War Planets (Shadow Raiders) – 40 episodes – Mainframe Entertainment
- Bratz Babies (The Movie) – MGA/SD Entertainment
- Spiff and Hercules – 52 episode – TFI/Col.Ima.Son/Channel 4 (UK)/Ocean
- Tony Hawk in Boom Boom Sabotage – Direct-to-video – Funimation/Mainframe Ent.
- Dragon Ball – Funimation/Seagull/Trimark (1995 dub)
- Dragon Ball: Curse of the Blood Rubies – Direct-to-video-Funimation/Trimark
- Max Steel – 6 direct-to-video movies – Mattel/Mainframe Ent.
- Candyland – Direct-to-video movie – Hasbro/SD Entertainment
- My Little Pony: A Very Pony PlaceDTV – Hasbro/SD Entertainment
- My Little Pony: Twinkle Wish Adventure – DTV – Hasbro/SD Entertainment
- My Little Pony: LIVE – DTV – Hasbro/SD Entertainment
- Hot Wheels: Highway 35 – World Race – Mattel/Mainframe Entertainment
- Hot Wheels: AcceleRacers – Ignition – Mattel/Mainframe Entertainment
- Hot Wheels: AcceleRacers – The Speed of Silence – Mattel/Mainframe Entertainment
- Hot Wheels: AcceleRacers – Breaking Point – Mattel/Mainframe Entertainment
- Hot Wheels: AcceleRacers – The Ultimate Race – Mattel/Mainframe Entertainment
- Scary Godmother – DTV – Mainframe Entertainment
- Lapitch the Little Shoemaker – Croatia Film/HaffaDiebold/Pro 7
- Billy the Cat – 52 episodes, 2 specials – Ocean Group/EVA Entertainment/NOA/WIC/Siriol Productions
- Sugar and Spice – Fuji Project Ltd/Saban Entertainment
- GeoTrax – "New Train in Town" – DTV – Fisher Price
- GeoTrax – "Legend of Old Rust" – DTV – Fisher Price
- GeoTrax – "Flying Lesson" – DTV – Fisher Price
- GeoTrax – "Steamer & Samuel Save The Day" – DTV – Fisher Price
- The Adventures of T-Rex – 52 episodes – Gunther/Wahl/Jetlag Productions
- King Arthur and the Knights of Justice – 26 episodes – Jetlag Productions
- Heavy Metal 2000 – Feature film – Columbia Tristar/CinéGroupe
- The Fearless Four – Feature film – Warner Brothers/Munich Animation
- Help! I'm a Fish! – Feature film – A Film/Munich Animation
- Jester Till – Feature film – Warner Brothers/Munich Animation
