= Steel (surname) =

Steel is a surname. Notable people with the surname include:

- A. G. Steel (1858–1914), English cricketer
- Ace Steel (born 1973), ring name of Christopher Guy, American professional wrestler
- Alan Steel (1935–2015), stage name of Sergio Ciani, Italian bodybuilder and actor
- Alex Steel (1886–1954), Scottish footballer
- Amy Steel (born 1960), American actress
- Amy Steel (netball) (born 1989), Australian netballer
- Anthony Steel (actor) (1920–2001), British actor
- Anthony Steel (historian) (1900–1973), British historian
- Anthony Steel (arts leader), active in Australia from 1972
- Tony Steel (1941–2018), New Zealand rugby player and politician
- Arthur Steel-Maitland (1876–1935), British politician
- Barbara Steel (1857–1943), Scottish-South African suffragette
- Belle Steel, Irish Presbyterian
- Ben Steel (born 1975), Australian actor
- Bill Steel (born 1939), English broadcaster and actor
- Billy Steel (1923–1982), Scottish footballer
- Bruce Steel (born 1966), American tennis player
- Brynjolf Steel (c. 1205 – c. 1270), Norwegian liegeman
- Brian Steel (born 1965), American attorney
- Bryan Steel (born 1969), English cyclist and multiple Olympic medallist
- Cameron Steel (born 1995), English cricketer
- Carly Steel (born 1987), British television presenter and actress
- Catherine Steel (born 1973), British classical scholar
- Charles Steel (1901−1993), British Army officer and civil servant
- Christine Steel, American actress
- Christopher Steel (composer) (1938–1991), British composer
- Sir Christopher Steel (diplomat) (1903–1973), British diplomat
- Chris Steel (born 1986), Australian politician
- Christopher Steele (born 1964), former British intelligence officer
- Christopher Steele (artist) (1733–1767), English artist
- Cynthia Dianne Steel, American judge
- Danielle Steel (born 1947), American author known for her romance novels
- Danny Steel (1884–1931), Scottish footballer
- David Steel (minister) (1910–2002), father of the politician
- Dave Steel, musician with Weddings Parties Anything and solo
- David Steel (Royal Navy officer) (born 1961), British admiral
- David Steel (businessman) (1916–2004), British businessman, chairman of BP, and of the Wellcome Trust
- David Steel, American voice actor
- Dawn Steel (1946–1997), one of the first women to run a major Hollywood film studio
- Dick Steel (1930–1991), English professional footballer
- Doctor Steel, stage name of Rion Vernon, American musician heading an alternative band
- Dorothy Steel (actress) (1926–2021), American actress
- Dorothy Steel (croquet player) (1884–1965), English croquet player, commonly referred to as D. D. Steel
- Douglas Steel (1856–1933), English cricketer
- Duncan Steel (born 1955), British/Australian astrophysicist
- Duncan G. Steel (born 1951), American experimental physicist
- Elizabeth Steel c. 1766 – 1795), English convict sent to Australia
- Elliot Steel, British comedian
- Eric Steel, American filmmaker and producer
- Flora Annie Steel (1847–1929), English writer
- Fred Steel (1884–bef. 1945), English footballer
- Freda Steel, Manitoba judge
- Gary Steel (born 1954), Australian rules footballer
- Gemma Steel (born 1985), British runner
- Geoff Steel, British auto racing driver and engineer
- George Steel (Manitoba politician) (1858–1940), provincial legislator in Manitoba, Canada
- George Steel (musician), music director and conductor in New York City, U.S.
- George A. Steel (Oregon politician) (1846–1918), politician in Oregon, U.S.
- George A. Steel (Michigan politician) (1862–1935), State Treasurer of Michigan
- George B. Steel (1835–1916), American politician in the Virginia House of Delegates
- Georgia Steel (born 1998), English television personality
- Harold Steel (1862–1911), English cricketer
- Harry Steel (politician) (1879–1962), Canadian politician
- Harry Steel (wrestler) (1899–1971), American wrestler
- Heather Steel (born 1940), British judge
- Hollie Steel (born 1998), English schoolgirl singer
- Ian Steel (1928–2015), Scottish racing cyclist
- J.A. Steel (born 1969), American writer, director, producer, editor, stunt person and actress
- Jack Steel (1898–1941), New Zealand rugby union player
- Sir James Steel (1830–1904), Lord Provost of Edinburgh
- James Steel, a character from the TV series Law & Order: UK
- Jim Steel (director) (1958–2014), American director, writer and producer of adult films
- Jim Steel (footballer) (born 1959), Scottish footballer
- Jody Steel, American artist
- John Steel (tailor), Scottish servant of King James IV
- John Steel (Canadian politician) (1737–1826), politician in Lower Canada
- John Steel (drummer) (born 1941), original drummer of the band The Animals
- John Steel (footballer, born 1895) (1895–1953), Scottish footballer (Queen's Park, Nelson)
- John Steel (footballer, born 1902) (1902–1976), Scottish footballer (Hamilton Academical, Burnley)
- John Steel (MP) (1786–1868), British MP for Cockermouth (1854–1857)
- John Steel (singer) (1895–1971), American tenor
- John Steel (swimmer) (born 1972), New Zealand Olympic swimmer
- John Miles Steel (1877–1965), first Commander-in-Chief of the RAF's Bomber Command
- John R. Steel (born 1948), American mathematician at University of California, Berkeley
- Leslie White, who wrote as "John Steel" for newspaper of Socialist Labor Party of America
- Jon Steel (born 1980), English rugby player
- Karen Steel, British scientist
- Kenneth Steel (1906–1970), British painter and engraver
- Kevin Steel (born 1991), American swimmer
- Liam Steel (born 1991), New Zealand rugby union player
- Louise Steel (archaeologist), Welsh archaeologist
- Louise Steel (broadcaster) (born 1985), Scottish broadcaster
- Mark Steel (born 1960), English socialist columnist, author and comedian
- Melissa Steel (born 1993), English singer
- Mike Steel (mathematician) (born 1960), professor in New Zealand
- Michael Steel, official of English company Hybrid Air Vehicles Ltd
- Miljenko Matijevic (born 1964), Croatian-American rock vocalist for the band Steelheart, also known as Mikey Steel
- Michael von Steel, actor on the gay vampire television series The Lair
- Michelle Steel (born 1955), American politician
- Nate Steel, American attorney and politician
- Paul Steel (born 1970), New Zealand squash player and coach
- Pippa Steel (1948–1992), British actress
- Ric Steel (born 1952), American singer
- Robert Steel (minister) (1827–1893), Scottish/Australian Presbyterian minister
- Robert Steel (chess player) (1839-1903), English chess player and businessman
- Bobby Steel (1888–1972), Scottish footballer
- Robert Walter Steel (1915–1997), professor of geography at Liverpool University and principal of the University College of Swansea
- Robert K. Steel (born 1951), president and CEO of Wachovia Corporation
- Ronald Steel (1931–2023), American writer and historian
- Ronnie Steel (1929–2009), English footballer
- Thomas B. Steel (born 1929), American computer scientist
- Tommy Steel, Scottish-American soccer player
- Trevor Steel (born 1958), English singer-songwriter
- Sam Steel (born 1998) Canadian ice hockey player
- Samuel Strang Steel (1882–1961), British politician
- Scudamore Winde Steel (1789–1865), British army officer of the East India Company
- Shawn Steel (born c. 1946), American politician and husband of Michelle Steel
- Simon Steel (born 1969), English cricketer
- William Gladstone Steel (1854–1934), American conservationist considered by many to be the father of Crater Lake National Park
- William Steel (golfer) (fl. 1860), Scottish golfer
- William Arthur Steel (1890–1968), Canadian Army officer and radio pioneer
- Willie Steel (1908–1990), Scottish footballer
- Bill Steel (born 1939), British actor and television and radio broadcaster
- Billy Steel (1923–1982), Scottish international footballer
- Jim Steel (footballer) (William James Steel, born 1959), Scottish footballer

== See also ==
- Max Steel (disambiguation)
