= Christian Campbell =

Canadian actor (born 1972)

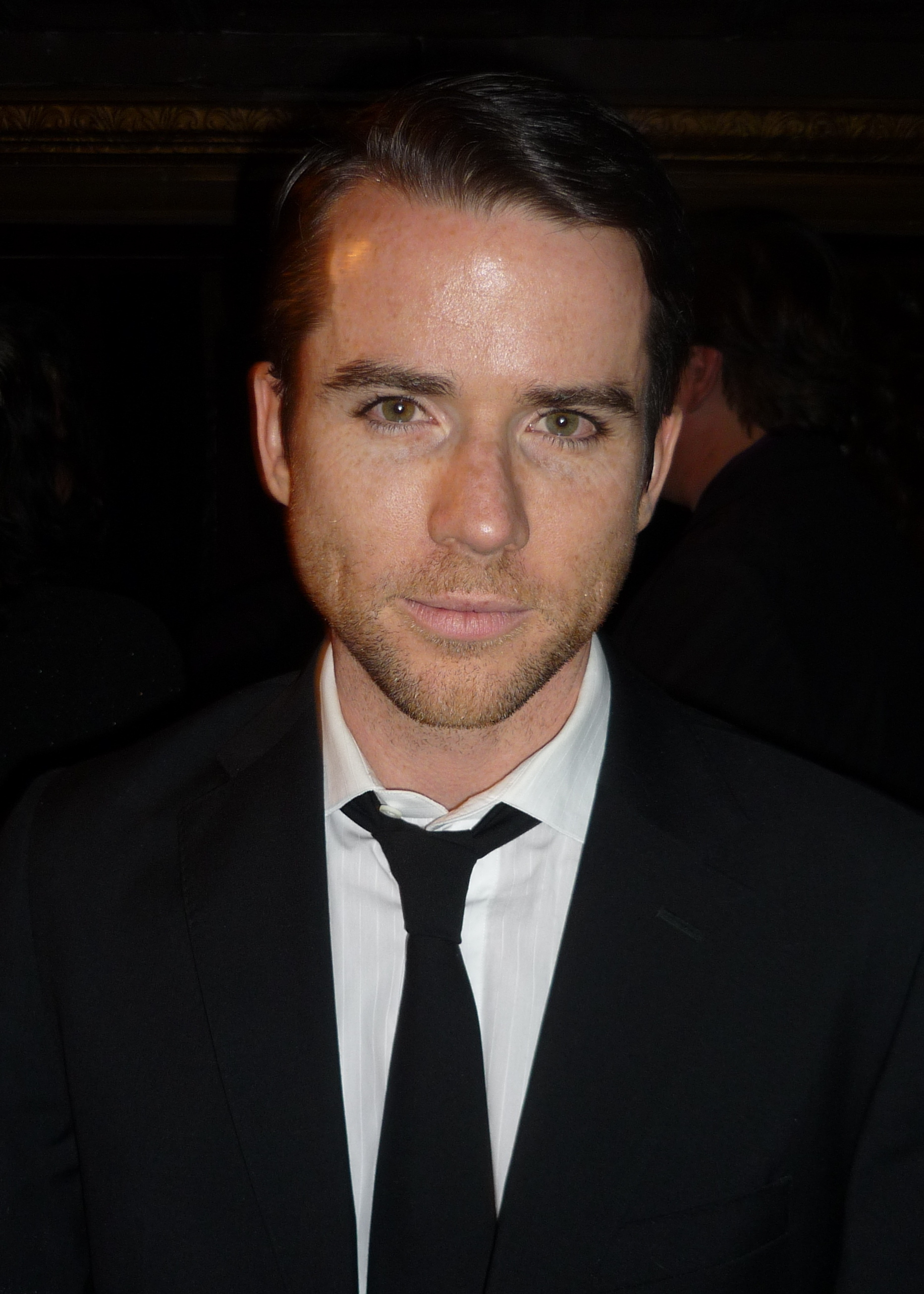
- Campbell in 2009
- Born: May 12, 1972 (age 54); Toronto, Ontario, Canada
- Occupation: Actor
- Years active: 1984–present
- Spouse: America Olivo (m. 2009)
- Children: 2 (Note: Campbell and Olivo's first child died in 2012 a few days after birth.)
- Relatives: Neve Campbell (sister); Nello Olivo (father-in-law); Danica d'Hondt (mother-in-law)

Christian Campbell (born May 12, 1972) is a Canadian actor. He is known for his roles as Gabriel in the film Trick and Greg Ivey in the television series Big Love. On stage, he has performed as Jimmy Harper in the musical Reefer Madness and Jon in the musical Tick, Tick... Boom!.

== Early life ==
Campbell's mother, Marnie (née Neve), is a yoga instructor and psychologist from Amsterdam, Netherlands, who also ran a theatre in Guelph, Ontario. His father, Gerry Campbell, a Scottish immigrant to Canada from the East End of Glasgow, Scotland, taught high school drama classes in Mississauga, Ontario — first at Westwood Secondary School (now Lincoln M. Alexander Secondary School), later at Lorne Park Secondary School, and now at Erindale Secondary School. Campbell's maternal grandparents ran a theatre company in the Netherlands and his paternal grandparents were also performers. On his mother's side, Campbell descends from Sephardi Jews who immigrated to the Netherlands and converted to Catholicism.

Campbell's parents divorced when he was three years old. His siblings are actress Neve Campbell, actor Alex Campbell, and Damian McDonald. He and his sister, Neve, resided largely with their father (who received custody of the two), with regular periods at their mother's home. Born into an acting family (his maternal grandparents having been actors in Amsterdam) and his father an acting teacher, Campbell began training at an early age. He was acting professionally by the age of fourteen. He attended Claude Watson School for the Arts in Toronto, Ontario.

== Film ==
Campbell starred in the gay-themed romantic comedy Trick in 1999. The feature film was a Sundance Grand Jury Prize nominated film. It grossed the most per-screen average for a gay-themed film at the time. In celebration of the fifteenth anniversary of the picture, Campbell spoke of the social climate at the time and how he, a straight actor, had taken on a gay role. "Having been in that movie... opened up a community," he said. "The gay community was incredibly supportive of me."

In 2001, Campbell teamed up with Trick co-star John Paul Pitoc in the feature-film Thank You, Good Night, co-starring with Mark Hamill and Sally Kirkland. He then starred in the 2004 short film Pretty Dead Girl. In 2009, Campbell starred in the feature film Neighbor along with America Olivo, who would later become his wife. He played conservative American political activist Ralph Reed in the 2010 movie Casino Jack.

Campbell starred along with Amy Smart in director Russell Friedenberg's 2014 feature film Among Ravens.

== Television ==
At the age of 16, Campbell made his television debut on the Canadian television series Degrassi High. Campbell's first starring role was in the television movie City Boy, in which he starred alongside James Brolin and Sarah Chalke. Campbell then starred in the 1995 ABC telefilm Picture Perfect. He moved to the United States in 1995 where he was soon cast as Teddy Delacourt in producer Aaron Spelling's primetime teen drama/soap opera Malibu Shores.

Campbell joined the cast of The $treet in 2000 as Tim Sherman. He then starred in the science fiction-action animated series Max Steel from 2000 to 2002, providing the voice of the protagonist, Josh McGrath, a 19-year-old fictional extreme sports star. Campbell joined All My Children as the recast Bobby Warner from 2004 to 2005, replacing Brian Gaskill for the role after a seven-year absence for the character. Along with Shannon Elizabeth, he starred in the 2008 made-for-TV movie You Belong To Me.

Before its abrupt cancellation, he had a starring role in the NBC drama The Book of Daniel.

In May 2010, Campbell had a guest-starring role as victim Ben Rooney in CSI: Miami season 8, episode 21, "Meltdown".

In 2013, Campbell joined the cast of the Lifetime original movie An Amish Murder, in which he played the brother of Kate Burkholder, who was played by his real life younger sister, Neve Campbell.

Campbell has a recurring role in the second season of HBO's True Detective. He can also be seen playing the villain Pierce Peters in the 2015 Disney Channel Original Movie Bad Hair Day.

== Theatre ==
Campbell's theatre training began early and was extensive due to his father being an acting teacher and his mother's acting background. His earliest acting roles were on the stage for his father's panto productions for the Association for Scottish Traditions and Arts in Etobicoke, Ontario. Campbell said of his early work with his father that "Dad was always throwing Neve and me on the stage. The pantos are comedies, sort of fantasies-sometimes fairy tales like Jack and the Beanstalk. In these shows there's a lot of humor, and always a cross-dresser. That's part of the genre." His first starring role on the stage was as the role of Nick in A Thousand Clowns, which was held at his mother's dinner theatre. He then toured Europe in the early 1990s, acting in stage plays such as Der Ritter Von Mirakel and A Clockwork Orange at the Schaulspielhaus, Nürnberg.

Shortly after his move to Los Angeles in 1995, Campbell co-founded the theatre company Blue Sphere Alliance. He began producing stage plays while working as an actor. Campbell made his directorial debut with Reach, a one-act play that starred Matthew Lillard and Sandra Thigpen. In 2000, Campbell produced his first off-Broadway play, Trust, in New York City. Campbell starred in Reefer Madness in 2001.

He performed in Jonathan Larson's tick... tick... BOOM! on a national tour of the United States in 2003 and in London at the Menier Chocolate Factory (July – September 2005). In 2006, he played Pip in Great Expectations at the Lucille Lortel Theatre in New York City. In 2009, he played J.D. in readings of Heathers: The Musical.

In July 2015 it was announced that Campbell would lead the cast of Harold Chapin's The New Morality at the Mint Theater.

== Other work ==
Campbell has been a photographer for the last two decades and showcases his work on his personal website.

He currently sits on the board of directors of the Players Club in New York City.

He served as producer and director of the documentary concert series Live from Gramercy Park and is the producer and director of the Broadway Dreams documentary series. Both series are produced by Campbell and wife America Olivo's production company EsoteriCam Productions.

== Personal life ==
Campbell met his wife, actress America Olivo, in 2009 on the set of the horror film Neighbor. They married in Italy in July 2009. Their first child, a daughter, was born in 2012, but died only days later due to the genetic condition Edwards syndrome.

After facing infertility issues of their own, Campbell and his wife decided to become spokespeople for the BabyQuest Foundation, a 501(c)(3) charitable organization that is "dedicated to helping couples and/or individuals build families through advanced fertility treatments". The couple had a second daughter in 2019.

== Filmography ==
- Degrassi High (1990) – Todd (1 episode)
- Clarence (1990; TV) (as Chris Campbell) – Larry
- 3×3 Eyes (Manga Entertainment Version) (1991–1992; V) – Yakumo Fujii (voice: English version)
- School's Out (1992; TV) – Todd
- Born to Run (1993; TV) – Jamie
- Matrix (1993) – Tony Lusano (1 episode)
- City Boy (1994; TV) – Nick
- TekWar (1995–1996) – Danny Cardigan (4 episodes)
- Picture Perfect (1995; TV) – Alan Walters
- Side Effects (1995) – Drew Armstrong (1 episode)
- 7th Heaven (1996) – Terry Daniels (1 episode)
- Malibu Shores (1996) – Teddy Delacourt (10 episodes)
- Seduced by Madness: The Diane Borchardt Story (1996) – Doug Vest (2 episodes)
- Hairshirt (1998) – Adam Lipton
- I've Been Waiting for You (1998; TV film) – Eric Garrett
- Next Time (1998) – Matt
- Cruel Justice (TV film) (1999) – Dean Joiner
- Trick (1999) – Gabriel
- Cold Hearts (1999) – John Luke
- Max Steel (2000–2002) – Max Steel (voice) (33 episodes)
- Angels! (2000) – Joe Bogsley
- Plead (2001) – Alan
- The Good Things (2001) – Rob Fambrough
- The $treet (2000–2001) – Tim Sherman (12 episodes)
- Thank You, Good Night (2001) – Lee
- Who Is A.B.? (2001)
- Red Faction II (2002; VG) – Alias (voice)
- Jeremiah (2002) – Reece Davenport (1 episode)
- The Piano Man's Daughter (2003; TV) – Charlie Kilworth
- Blue Murder (2003) – Steff Marable (1 episode)
- The Atwood Stories (2003) – Richard (1 episode)
- Chaos Legion (2003; VG) – Sieg Wahrheit (voice: English version)
- All My Children (2004–2005) – Robert 'Bobby' Thorne Warner #4 (9 episodes)
- Pretty Dead Girl (2004) – Mortie
- Max Steel: Endangered Species (2004; V) – Max Steel (voice)
- Reefer Madness: The Movie Musical (2005) – Jimmy Harper
- Max Steel: Forces of Nature (2005; V) – Max Steel
- Max Steel: Countdown (2006; V) – Max Steel (voice)
- Banshee (2006; TV) – Larch
- The Book of Daniel (2006) – Peter Webster (8 episodes)
- Max Steel: Dark Rival (2007; V) – Max Steel (voice)
- One Night (2007) – Gregg
- CSI: NY (2007) – Noah Hubler (1 episode)
- You Belong to Me (2008; TV) – Michael McBride
- Max Steel: Bio Crisis (2008; V) – Max Steel (voice)
- NCIS (2008) – Nick Kingston (1 episode, Heartland 2008)
- Ghost Whisperer (2008) – Lucas Marston (1 episode)
- The Betrayed (2008) – Kevin
- The Verdict (2008; TV) – Rob
- Ibid (2008) – Lionel
- Clear Blue Tuesday (2009) – Obnoxious Co-Worker
- Neighbor (2009) – Don Carpenter
- CSI: Miami (2010) – Ben Rooney (1 episode)
- Casino Jack (2010) – Ralph Reed
- Big Love (2011) – Greg Ivey (8 episodes)
- Immortal Island (2011) – Agent Ron Cecil
- Unkindness of Ravens (2012) – Will
- Scooby-Doo! Music of the Vampire (2012) – Bram (voice)
- Sworn to Silence (2012) – Jacob
- Haven (2013) – Ben Harker Jr. (2 episodes)
- A Family Reunion (2013) - Mitch Banner
- Supernatural (2013) – James Frampton (1 episode)
- Darkroom (2013) – Larry
- Among Ravens (2014) – Will Deville
- True Detective (2015) – Richard Brune (3 episodes)
- Bad Hair Day (2015) – Pierce
- Her Composition (2015) – Client #1
- Drawing Home (2017) – Cliff Whyte
- Law & Order (2022) – Ethan Merritt (Episode: "Severance")
- Kiya & the Kimoja Heroes (2023–2024) – Zane/Acrobrat (voice) (26 episodes)
