= Lisa Ann Beley =

Canadian voice actress

- Other names: Lisa Anne Beley; Lisa Ann Belay
- Education: University of British Columbia
- Occupations: Voice actress; teacher
- Spouse: Jonathan Holmes
- Children: 1

Lisa Ann Beley is a Canadian voice actress who often voices over roles which have either regal, motherly, or older sisterly love and authority within them.

== Early life ==
Beley studied in the University of British Columbia's acting program and received her BFA in 1990. In 1995 she went back to school and received her MFA and Voice Teachers diploma from York University two years later.

=== Personal life ===
Beley now lives in Washington D.C., working in the Corcoran School of the Arts and Design.

Beley is married to fellow voice actor Jonathan Holmes and has one daughter, Bronwen.

== Voice roles ==
=== Anime dubbing ===
- .hack//Roots – Ender, Pi
- Black Lagoon – Eda
- Brain Powered – Dr. Irene Carrier, Kanan's Mother
- The Daichis – Earth's Defense Family – Seiko Daichi
- Death Note – Halle Lidner
- Dragon Ball Z – Chi-Chi (Ocean Group dub) (Movie 1 Dead Zone and Movie 2 The World's Strongest)
- Dragon Drive – Agent L, Mukai's Mother
- Elemental Gelade – Ofrus
- Fatal Fury: The Motion Picture – Mai Shiranui
- Inuyasha – Enju, Additional Voices
- Inuyasha: The Final Act – Sesshomaru's mother (ep. 9), Shishinki's assistant (ep. 13)
- Junkers Come Here – Suzuko Nozawa
- Mix Master – Jamine, Bubri
- Melty Lancer: The Animation – Melvina MACGARLEN
- Mobile Suit Gundam – Kamaria Ray
- Mobile Suit Gundam 00 – Sumeragi Lee Noriega/Leesa Kujo
- Mobile Suit Gundam SEED – Eileen Canaver, Murrue Ramius
- Mobile Suit Gundam SEED Destiny – Murrue Ramius
- Mobile Suit Gundam Wing – Relena Peacecraft/Darlian
- Powerpuff Girls Z – Joey
- Ronin Warriors – Lady Kayura
- Nurse Witch Komugi – Yui Kihara
- Shakugan no Shana – Tiamat (Season 1)
- Silent Möbius – Kiddy Phenil, Rosa Cheyenne (Teenager), Teres Vargie
- The SoulTaker – Yui Kihara
- The Story of Saiunkoku – Shokun Hong, Young Koyu Ri, Lady of the Night 1, Seien's Mother
- Tico of the Seven Seas
- Transformers: Cybertron – Override
- The Vision of Escaflowne – Marlene Ashton
- The New Adventures of Kimba The White Lion – Riya
- Zoids Zero – Mary Champ
- Voltron Force – Onna Cat Kendall Zelda

=== Non-anime ===
- Hot Wheels AcceleRacers – Karma Eiss
- Death Note 2: The Last Name – Kiyomi Takada (English dub)
- Eternals – Thena Elliot, Ludmilla
- Exosquad – Lt. Nara Burns
- G.I. Joe: Spy Troops – Scarlett
- G.I. Joe: Valor vs. Venom – Scarlett
- He-Man and the Masters of the Universe – Teela
- Inhumans – Medusa
- Iron Man: Armored Adventures – Iron Man Onboard Computer
- Max Steel: Countdown – Kat Ryan
- Max Steel: Dark Rival – Kat Ryan
- Planet Hulk – Caiera
- Sherlock Holmes in the 22nd Century – Additional Voices
- Slugterra – Resistance Leader, Tough Kid
- Street Fighter – Cammy
- Hero 108
- Wolverine: Weapon X – Miranda Bayer, Evan Wakowski (Kid), Amy, Agent #5, Nurse, Spider-Woman, Female Scientist, Tech
- X-Men: Evolution – Dr. Deborah Risman/Madame Hydra

=== Video games ===
- Dynasty Warriors Gundam 2 – Rezin Schnyder (English Version)
- Mobile Suit Gundam: Encounters in Space – Kycilia Zabi, Cima Garahau (English Version)
- Mark of the Ninja – Ora
- Warhammer 40,000: Dawn of War: Soulstorm – Additional Voices
- Invisible, Inc. – Nika
