= List of Max Steel (2000 TV series) episodes =

Max Steel was first broadcast on February 26, 2000. The first season has 13 episodes, every episode starting with the letter "S". In the first four episodes, Josh and Max share the same face. In episode 5, Max appears for the first time with his actual face, which is completely different from Josh's, more mature and tough. However, the same old model of his face is reused in episode 9, "Sabres", presumably due to a change in the order of production of the episodes. The original presentation of the show portrayed Max chasing and fighting terrorists around the world. Because of this, after the September 11, 2001 attacks, the word "terrorist" was filtered out from some episodes, but not from the opening.

In season 1, there are some apparently inconsistent broadcast dates. One episode could have been aired in April, while the episode that should have followed it was not broadcast until September. This was fixed in the following two seasons.

== Series overview ==
Season	Episodes	Originally released		
Season	Episodes	First released	Last released	Network
1	13	February 26, 2000	October 14, 2000	Kids' WB
2	13	October 28, 2000	June 23, 2001	Kids' WB
3	9	November 12, 2001	December 13, 2002	Cartoon Network

== Episodes ==
=== Season 1 (2000) ===
No.	Title	Directed by	Written by	Original release date	Prod. code
1	"Strangers"	Andre Clavel	Greg Weisman	February 26, 2000	101
N-TEK has sent Team Steel to Berlin to protect a Peace Conference from a possible terrorist attack. Unfortunately, mysterious Dread operative L'Etranger kidnaps everyone at the conference, including Team Steel's senior agent, Rachel Leeds.
2	"Shadows"	Sam Liu	Greg Weisman	March 11, 2000	102
Max Steel, Jeff Smith and Mari Keita are nearly blown out of the sky by a Dread missile attack. Assuming the missile's target was U.N. Secretary General Keita, Team Steel is assigned to protect her.
3	"Sacrifices"	Sean Song	Lydia Marano	March 4, 2000	103
Josh/Max is still having nightmares about Psycho. And it doesn't help that he's trying to stop Psycho and Dread from blackmailing Paris with a device that generates an Electro-magnetic pulse which can shut Max down like a light switch.
4	"Sportsmen"	Alan Caldwell	Jon Weisman	March 25, 2000	104
Josh McGrath quits the Del-Oro Extreme because he thinks it's unfair for him to compete now that he possesses super-human powers. However, strange occurrences force him to compete as Max Steel.
5	"Seraphim"	Andre Clavel	Michael Reaves	May 13, 2000	105
In Shanghai, Team Steel sets out to retrieve a stolen computer disk called "Seraph," while Josh simultaneously tries not to let Laura down by standing her up for her brother's wedding.
6	"Spear-Carriers"	Sam Liu	Kevin Hopps	September 23, 2000	106
Someone or something is stealing experimental aircraft right out of the sky. Max, 'Berto, Rachel and Chuck Marshak use Behemoth, Team Steel's new mobile base of operations, as bait. Their plan works a bit too well.
7	"Snowblind"	Vincenzo Trippetti	Mike Ryan	May 20, 2000	107
Set up with 'Berto's help over the bio-link, Max tracks Psycho to a Dread lair deep within an ice cave. But John Dread has been intercepting Max's Bio-Link frequency and impersonating 'Berto to lure Max out of Del-Oro Bay and into a trap.
8	"Sharks"	Sean Song	Katherine Fugate	April 8, 2000	108
Crazy Woody Barkowski's hurricane-machine seemingly sinks the freighter Colosso and its dangerous cargo of plutonium, and Team Steel is sent to retrieve it.
9	"Sabres"	Andre Clavel	Cary Bates	April 1, 2000	109
N-TEK's SABRE space station is falling out of orbit. Max Steel and Jake Nez (Rachel Leeds' ex-boyfriend) are sent up to salvage it, but that becomes impossible when Psycho & his new partner Vitriol enter the picture for Dread.
10	"Sphinxes"	Alan Caldwell	Gary Sperling	April 22, 2000	110
Team Steel is sent to Egypt to investigate suspicious energy readings coming from the Great Pyramid. Is the Curse of Khufu bringing Egyptian death-gods and mummies to life?
11	"Swashbucklers"	Sean Song	Jon Weisman	September 16, 2000	111
Spring break! Josh and Laura head down to Baja and stumble on a mystery involving Pirates and the missing sons of his American literature professor Guerard.
12	"Scions"	Alan Caldwell	Cary Bates	September 30, 2000	112
Josh, dumped by Laura and on academic probation, is ready to live as Max Steel full time. Team Steel is sent to Tenerife to investigate a volcano that is erupting without geological cause.
13	"Shattered"	Sam Liu	Kevin Hopps	October 14, 2000	113
Vitriol escapes from N-TEK; Laura will not talk to Josh; the U.N. building and everyone inside are about to be crushed by a mysterious fungus; Mariot turns out to be a spy for Dread.

=== Season 2 (2000–01) ===
No.	Title	Directed by	Written by	Original release date	Prod. code
14	"The Return"	Sam Liu	Tom Pugsley, Greg Klein	October 28, 2000	114
Several near-miss "accidents" on the Del Oro campus have Josh believing that someone knows Max's secret identity and is targeting him.
15	"Fun in the Sun"	Alan Caldwell	Steven Melching	November 4, 2000	202
Josh McGrath goes to Honolulu, Hawaii, bringing 'Berto along in an effort to help him get out from behind the computer screen and enjoy life. They have fun doing various outdoor island activities until a minor tidal wave strikes the city.
16	"Amazon"	Sean Song	Tom Pugsley, Greg Klein	November 11, 2000	203
Deep in the Amazon rain forest, Psycho has come up with a way to create a poison gas from the sap of a rare tree. Max and 'Berto go down to stop him, and in the process team up with a new operative: a tough female agent named Kat.
17	"When Lightning Strikes Twice"	Frank Squillace	Katherine Fugate	November 18, 2000	204
Woody Barkowski's little sister, Annabelle, is back. An accident in her laboratory has transformed her into the villainous Electrix, who feeds off electrical power in the same way Max's nano-probes feed off transphasik power.
18	"Fire and Ice"	Sam Liu	Steven Melching	December 2, 2000	205
Vitriol is up to something in Alaska, and Max is the closest agent. While en route to the site where Vitriol kidnapped a pair of N-TEK scientists, Max discovers that Pete has stowed away aboard the Hawk, hoping to participate in the mission.
19	"Trapped"	Alan Caldwell	Tom Pugsley, Greg Klein	December 9, 2000	206
A high tech research and development company in Washington D.C. has been taken over by a disgruntled former employee, Clark Ashworth, a brilliant Gen X'er who is after a high tech weapon he designed.
20	"Steel Vs. Steel"	Sean Song	Tom Pugsley, Greg Klein	December 16, 2000	207
Max, Kat and 'Berto are sent to a remote island used as an N-Tek training facility to put 'Berto's latest creations: Tek-Bots.
21	"Space Opera (AKA "Shooting Stars")"	Frank Squillace	Steven Melching	January 20, 2001	208
Berto finally gets the chance at the limelight when he is selected to fly aboard the next launch of NASA's new Space Cruiser.
22	"Old Friend, New Enemy"	Sam Liu	Tony Schillaci	February 10, 2001	209
Max and Kat battle former N-Tek research scientist Dr. David Klimo, who is doing genetic research into venomous snakes' DNA in order to produce deadly biological weapons. An accident turns him into the deadly Bio-Con (Bio-Constrictor), a snake-like man.
23	"Extreme"	Sean Song	David Slack	February 17, 2001	210
When Max, 'Berto, and Jefferson track a pair of thieves stealing computer components to the Annual Del Oro Extreme, Max must go undercover as Josh. While competing, Josh meets Skateboarding legend, Tony Hawk voiced by himself.
24	"Best Friend"	Alan Caldwell	Tom Pugsley, Greg Klein	March 3, 2001	211
When Josh meets a new friend, Garrett Stevens, it turns out Garrett is not who he seems to be. He has been brainwashed to kill Dr Mark Montgomery.
25	"The Race"	Frank Squillace	Dan Perry	March 10, 2001	212
After Jefferson unveils a new high tech N-Tek vehicle, Max convinces his father to allow he, Kat and 'Berto to "road test" it in the grueling off road Sahara Run.
26	"Breakout"	Alan Caldwell	Tom Pugsley, Greg Klein	June 23, 2001	213
Max and Kat are about to capture the recently reemerged Bio-Constrictor, when the Snake Man is rescued by none other than Psycho. The two escape Max and Kat. After it, Max and Kat are brought back by Jeff. Jeff wants Max and Kat to let other agents take care of Psycho and Bio-Con, and transport Dread to a maximum security prison. Meanwhile, Psycho, believing that since he saved Bio-Con he owns him, offers Bio-Con a deal: if he helps him break Dread out of a transport, he will help destroy N-Tek and Jefferson Smith.

=== Season 3 (2001–02) ===
No.	Title	Directed by	Written by	Original release date	Prod. code
27	"Deep Cover"	Andre Clavel	Marsha F. Griffin	November 12, 2001	301
N-TEK has finally succeeded in bringing down John Dread's evil empire, but the operation's climax was so explosive that it completely blew N-TEK'S cover.
28	"Survival Instinct"	Dick Sebast	Marsha F. Griffin	November 19, 2001	302
While snowboarding in the Alps, Team Steel has a dangerous run-in with Ethan Raptor, leader of a rival extreme sports team called Team Raptor (which includes athlete Tripp Thompson and manager Carlie Hoffman).
29	"Cold Sweat"	Hank Tucker	Tony Schillaci	December 5, 2001	303
Josh, Kat and ‘Berto attend the worldwide hockey playoffs. As the game begins, Vitriol and his new band of thugs take over the arena and attempt to kidnap 14-year-old Jeremy Latham who is the son of wealthy sports and media mogul.
30	"Fan Appreciation"	Brandon Vietti	Andrew Robinson	December 6, 2001	304
Josh, Kat and 'Berto attend the grand opening of a new Mega-Extreme Sports Park in Del Oro, built by Richard Shine, a 20-something Silicon Valley millionaire, extreme sports fanatic and big fan of Kat's.
31	"Rough Seas"	Andre Clavel	Steven Melching	December 12, 2001	305
Josh, Kat and 'Berto take part in a sports fantasy cruise aboard the cruise ship Oceanus, having a free vacation in exchange for promoting N-TEK products and signing autographs.
32	"Prey"	Dick Sebast	Marsha F. Griffin	December 17, 2001	306
While Josh is out racing the Wave Storm through an inlet that cuts through the South American jungle, the pontoon boat crashes and Josh is stranded. However, something or someone in the jungle is watching him.
33	"Special Delivery"	Hank Tucker	Marsha F. Griffin	December 21, 2001	307
Team Steel helps bike stunt legend Mat Hoffman when someone ransacks his hotel room and then tries to kidnap him.
34	"Turbulence"	Brandon Vietti	Marsha F. Griffin	July 15, 2002	308
When a prison transport plane carrying three dangerous convicts drops off the radar, Team Steel discovers that it has been stolen by Psycho, who plans to rob the Federal Reserve with their help.
35	"Truth Be Told"	Andre Clavel	Marsha F. Griffin	December 13, 2002	309
Josh, Kat, 'Berto and extreme sports star Jeremy McGrath return to the command van after a super-cross event, only to discover the vehicle has been booby-trapped with a tamper-proof bomb. Josh changes to Max-mode, revealing his secret to Jeremy. After they escape, Psycho traps them in a container and sends them to the bottom of the ocean, where the pressure will eventually crush them. While they await their doom, Max, Kat and 'Berto tell Jeremy about past events (which are represented in flashbacks).

== Post-TV series ==
2008-2011 Turbo Missions & Turbo Missions N-Tek Adventures.
