= Max Steel: Endangered Species =

- Directed by: Sean Frewer
- Written by: Ian Richter; Dean Stefan
- Produced by: Ian Richter; Gio Corsi
- Starring: Christian Campbell; Meghan Black; Michael Donovan; Venus Terzo; Alessandro Juliani; Kathleen Barr; Brian Drummond; Scott McNeil
- Music by: Brian Carson
- Production company: Mainframe Entertainment
- Distributed by: Mattel Entertainment
- Release date: 2004
- Running time: 70 minutes
- Country: Canada
- Language: English

Max Steel: Endangered Species is a 2004 animated science fiction action film based on the TV series and action figure line of the same name. It is the only Max Steel movie to share continuity with the TV series.

A sequel, titled Max Steel: Forces of Nature, was released in 2005.

== Plot ==
In this movie, Psycho and Bio-Con join forces to transform humanity into mutants who will be ruled by them. At one point, Psycho betrays Bio-Con, making him be trapped by a Psycho-robot (who looks like a silver-colored Psycho) who later self-destructs so that Psycho can rule the world instead of "sharing" it. Max tracks down Psycho and fights him. After the fight, Psycho attacks Max and 'Berto while they're trying to turn off the machine. Max kicks Psycho into the air, landing him into his own mutating device, which explodes. At the end of the movie, Elementor, a clone of Bio-Con, awakens, later to be the villain of the second movie and the new villain of the toyline.

== Cast ==
- Christian Campbell as Max Steel
- Brian Drummond as Psycho and the Psycho-bots
- Scott McNeil as Bio-Constrictor (Bio-Con)
- Alessandro Juliani as 'Berto
- Meghan Black as Kat
- Nigel Mickelson as Elementor (in developing form)

== Action figures ==
Max Steel: Endangered Species marks the last appearances of Psycho and Bio-Con, along with the last time that figures of them are made (excluding future Psycho-bot figures). The last Psycho figures were a silver repaint of the first Psycho figure that represents the Psycho-robot, and another Psycho with the same mold of the original Psycho, but has a different bionic arm: Instead of the original Psycho which had a claw arm, this one has a poseable arm, like that of the explosion face Psycho figure. He also comes with a gun. The last Bio-Con figures were two copper repaints of the Bio-Con figures (Bio-Con's skin changes to copper color in some scenes of the movie). One copper Bio-Con has a similar build to the original Bio-Con figure, however, his arms are cobras (something that happens in the movie). The other is a repaint of the "Super-Spit" figure, with the same mold, just painted copper.
