= Care Bears: The Giving Festival =

- Directed by: Davis Doi (supervising); Larry Houston
- Written by: Thomas Hart
- Produced by: Robert Winthrop
- Starring: Tracey Moore; Ashleigh Ball; Tabitha St. Germain; Ian James Corlett; Scott McNeil
- Music by: Carl Johnson
- Production companies: SD Entertainment; American Greetings
- Distributed by: Lionsgate Home Entertainment
- Release date: November 2, 2010
- Running time: 67 minutes
- Country: United States
- Language: English

Care Bears: The Giving Festival is a 2010 American animated fantasy film starring the Care Bears characters. Produced by SD Entertainment and released on DVD by Lionsgate on November 2, 2010, the film follows the Care Power Team—which includes Funshine Bear, Cheer Bear, Grumpy Bear and Share Bear—as they organize their annual Giving Festival. The bears must rescue a princess named Starglo from impending weather.

== Release ==
The DVD of The Giving Festival features an episode from the CBS series Adventures in Care-a-lot, containing the stories "Belly Blanked" and "All Give and No Take".

== Reception ==
The film has received mixed reviews. C.S. Strowbridge of The Numbers, a box-office tracking website, said that it "is exactly what you would expect from the Care Bears. It's not exactly a feature-length film, and it feels a little episodic, but it is bright and full of adventure." However, writing for DVD Talk, Paul Mavis gave it one star out of five. Deeming it "Dishonest right from the get-go", he also said, "When I want a Care Bears Christmas movie ... and I do ... I want it to actually be about Christmas, not some wishy-washy P.C. 'Giving Festival' euphemism."

== See also ==
- List of American films of 2010
- List of computer-animated films
