= The Good Things (film) =

2001 American short film

The Good Things is a 2001 short film which received Best Short Film at the 2002 Deauville Film Festival.

== Plot ==
Wil Wheaton portrays Zach Means, a frustrated Kansas tollbooth worker whose friend has invited him to take a round-the-world cruise with him. While desiring to take him up on this offer, Zach is hesitant to leave behind his familiar surroundings to enter the great unknown. The film focuses on a day in Means' life at the Matfield Green tollbooth, an isolated exit miles away from any sizable settlements, where Means spends much of his time hitting golf balls while waiting for the occasional driver to pass through his station. During the course of the day, Zach learns that his childhood sweetheart, Christina, will be marrying another friend of his. One of the drivers passing through the booth (who knows Zach) asks him why he doesn't take his sailor friend up on his offer, and when this man returns later to find Zach gone, he assumes that Zach has finally decided to go for it—until he encounters a road crew a few miles down a desolate stretch of highway, with Zach as the signman.
