= Max Steel: Countdown =

- Directed by: Sean Sullivan
- Written by: Steven Melching
- Produced by: Ian Richter; Steven Wendland
- Starring: Christian Campbell; Alessandro Juliani; Lisa Ann Beley; Scott McNeil; Brian Drummond; Michael Donovan
- Edited by: Michael Dowding
- Music by: Brian Kirk; Greg Burns; Jeff Burns
- Production company: Mainframe Entertainment
- Distributed by: Mattel Entertainment
- Release date: 2006
- Running time: 50 minutes
- Country: Canada
- Language: English

Max Steel: Countdown is a 2006 animated science fiction action film based on the TV series and action figure line of the same name. It is the sequel to Max Steel: Forces of Nature (2005) and the third film overall in the Max Steel direct-to-video film series.

A sequel, titled Max Steel: Dark Rival, was released in October 2007.

== Plot ==
Max Steel and Dr. Roberto "'Berto" Martinez, working for the global anti-terrorist organization N-Tek, have finally managed to locate their former enemy Psycho's base. Once inside, Max finds a device called the "Imploder": A machine that condenses all surrounding matter into a miniature black hole. Before Max can retrieve the machine, he's ambushed by hundreds of androids. A battle ensues, but 'Berto manages to remotely shut the androids down, saving Max's life.

After returning to N-Tek's new base, 'Berto tells Max of his new nano-probes he's working on, which are stronger and more durable. However, he hasn't been able to find a sustainable energy source. Later, Max takes a small leave and goes for some fun sporting with his former partner, Kat Ryan. During this, 'Berto finds a possible way to complete his nano-probe project by using Max's natural adrenaline to power his nano-probes.

Overnight, Elementor, now only able to survive in a gas-like form, invades N-Tek and possesses the body of the base's boss and Max's adoptive father, Jefferson Smith. In an attempt to reconstitute his physical form, he plans to use a transfasik generator. Max and Kat arrive at N-Tek during this, and they, along with 'Berto, head to the transfasik generator and discover what is happening. 'Berto reverses the power, hoping to reverse the process and break up the elements. However, it forces Elementor to copy and divide himself into five bodies: Fire, Earth, Water, Air, and Metal. During this, Max is accidentally hit by some of the negative energy, shorting out his nano-probes, while Kat is hit by a piece of Elementium, leaving her poisoned. The Elementors attack and severely injure Max before escaping. 'Berto uses his new nano-probes in an attempt to save Max's life, which works, leaving Max much stronger than he was before.

The Elementors, each with a mind of their own, begin an attempt to take over the Earth by merging with the planet, which will kill every single living being in hours. Max tricks Elementor into following him, managing to reunite the Elementors in a desert wasteland, where 'Berto has reconstructed the Imploder to only affect Elementium. The process combines the Elementors and nukes the creature, stripping him of all the isotopes in his body, leaving him in his original Bio-Con clone state. The explosion also takes the Elementium out of Kat's body, saving her life. With Elementor weakened, the team manage to capture and imprison him.

== Cast ==
- Christian Campbell as Max Steel
- Scott McNeil as Elementor and Jefferson Smith
- Alessandro Juliani as 'Berto
- Lisa Ann Beley as Kat and the N-Tek computer voice
- Michael Donovan as Dr. Hershnev
- Brian Drummond as Psycho and Psycho-bots
