= Max Steel: Dark Rival =

2007 animated film by William Lau

- Directed by: William Lau
- Written by: Steven Melching
- Produced by: Ian Richer; Steven Wendland
- Starring: Christian Campbell; Alessandro Juliani; Scott McNeil; Lisa Ann Beley; Brian Drummond; David Kaye; Elias Toufexis
- Edited by: Patrick Carroll
- Music by: Greg Burns; Jeff Burns; Brian Kirk
- Production company: Rainmaker Entertainment
- Distributed by: Mattel Entertainment
- Release date: October 2007
- Running time: 50 minutes
- Country: Canada
- Language: English

Max Steel: Dark Rival is a 2007 animated science fiction action film based on the TV series and action figure line of the same name. It is the sequel to Max Steel: Countdown (2006) and the fourth film overall in the Max Steel direct-to-video film series.

A sequel, titled Max Steel: Bio Crisis, was released in October 2008.

== Plot ==
Strange thefts of N-Tek property have Max Steel on the tail of a new super-agent, Troy Winter, who claims to be superior to Max in every sense. The chase is on when Team Steel realize Troy's goal is to obtain a piece of a comet named Morphos using the stolen N-Tek technology and deliver it into enemy hands. During a battle with Max, Troy falls into a volcano with a piece of the comet. The chemical reaction between the extreme heat and the comet's components transforms Troy into a sharped dark mineral crystal-like creature, with the power of "extrude" other living being's life force and abilities. Troy then adopts the name of Extroyer and attacks N-Tek headquarters. In the middle of confusion, Elementor is once again released. Extremely weak, Elementor chases Extroyer seeking the comet fragments as a new source of power, but he is "extruded" and defeated. Troy takes 'Berto, Kat and Jefferson as hostages and forces Max to obey him. Extroyer uses N-Tek's stolen magnets powered by Max to redirect the comet Morphos near earth, so he can take as much crystal fragments as he wants, but too late he realizes it is all a setup, and he's sent into deep space instead, stuck in the comet's surface.

== Cast ==
- Christian Campbell as Max Steel
- Scott McNeil as Elementor, Jefferson Smith and a male tour guide
- Alessandro Juliani as 'Berto
- Lisa Ann Beley as Kat and the N-Tek computer voice
- Brian Drummond as Troy Winter/Extroyer and the nuclear plant computer voice
- David Kaye as Warren Hunter
