= ReBoot (video game) =

1998 video game

- Developer: EA Canada
- Publisher: Electronic Arts
- Directors: Denise Brown; Mark Lutz
- Producer: Jules Burt
- Designer: George Ashcroft
- Programmer: Jan Tian
- Composer: Robert Buckley
- Platform: PlayStation
- Release: NA: March 18, 1998; PAL: April 1998
- Genre: Action
- Mode: Single-player

ReBoot is a 1998 video game developed and published by Electronic Arts for the PlayStation video game console. It is based on the television show of the same name. The story follows Bob stopping Megabyte's plan to take over Mainframe through the use of energy tears. The game's creation began in 1995, when two representatives (one from EA Canada, the other from Mainframe Studios) met and agreed on the idea. EA Canada spent over the next three years going through various technological meetings during the development cycle. ReBoot garnered mixed reviews from critics who were divided over the digital control, gameplay and graphics.

== Gameplay ==
The player controls Bob, who starts with an ordinary pistol. The main goal in each level is to mend the tear and kill enemies. Weapons that are more powerful can be obtained as the player progresses through the game. Bob can use a variety of keytools to either mend a tear or defeat an enemy. Keytool abilities include stealing health from enemies to replenish the player's; scrambling the wires of Megabyte's basic weapon, the turret, to turn it against enemies; and freezing enemies for a limited period of time. Throughout each level is an item that can be used to power up the player's weapon, replenish health or give the player temporary invincibility. Some items are hidden, while others appear after defeating an enemy. In the game, there are cutscenes that play after every level. If the player completes a level in a quick amount of time, close to the time given to mend a tear, a good version of the cutscene will play. If the player fails to finish the level before this hidden timer runs out, a bad version of the cutscene will play. There are no Game Cubes in the game.

== Plot ==
Megabyte has found a way to use the power of energy tears to reach the core of the principal office thanks to Hexadecimal's mirrors and is determined to take over Mainframe. Bob, the game's lead character, must mend tears and destroy deadly adversaries in the six sectors of Mainframe: Baudway, Cit E (also known as Wall Street), Beverly Hills, Kits, Floating Point Park and G-Prime along with the island of Lost Angles.

== Development ==
EA Canada's studio was located close to Mainframe Studios, which produced the ReBoot television series. In 1995, representatives from the two studios met and agreed to make a game based on the show. EA Canada spent a year in design meetings, testing game concepts and prototype technologies. The entire development cycle was roughly two years.

== Reception ==
Reception

Aggregate score
Aggregator	Score
GameRankings	70%

Review scores
Publication	Score
CNET Gamecenter	4/10
Edge	7/10
Electronic Gaming Monthly	5.875/10
Game Informer	7/10
GameRevolution	B
GameSpot	4.1/10
IGN	7/10
Next Generation	3/5
PlayStation Official Magazine – UK	7/10
PlayStation: The Official Magazine	3.5/5

ReBoot held a 70% on the review aggregation website GameRankings based on six reviews.

GameSpot's Josh Smith criticized the game's poor camera views and wrote, "As is no surprise to anyone following the history of video game licenses, the game offers mediocre gameplay whose few innovations are overshadowed by the half-baked quality of the game's control and graphics." He was particularly critical of the control, commenting that learning how to use the Zipboard is difficult, and the cumbersomeness of stopping and changing directions makes it extremely frustrating to simply navigate the game world. IGN wrote, "Although this game doesn't really break any technological or graphical boundaries, Reboot is a fun game." IGN praised the skateboard gameplay elements, while also noting that its environments "look almost identical" to the television series. However, IGN criticized the game's digital control, writing that it plays better with an analog controller.

Kelly Rickards of Electronic Gaming Monthly echoed Smith in saying that the entire experience felt shaded by struggles with the controls, while his three co-reviewers found the controls work well enough and praised the graphics, freely explorable 3D levels, and faithful capturing of the spirit of the TV series, but concluded that the repetitive gameplay objectives make the game an overall disappointment which becomes tedious and dull after a few levels. Next Generation wrote, "The game is technically fine, very playable, but it somehow lacks cohesion as an adventure." They noted that the release ended up being poorly timed, since the show the game is based on had just been cancelled. GamePro praised the graphics and soundtrack, and called it "the rare game that transcends its license to become a great stand-alone experience", while mentioning minor issues such as difficult platform gameplay, the time needed to learn the controls, and the lack of selectable difficulty levels. (Note: GamePro gave the game 4.5/5 for graphics, 4.5/5 for sound, 4.0/5 for control, and 4.05/5 for fun factor.)
