= Scott McNeil =

Canadian actor

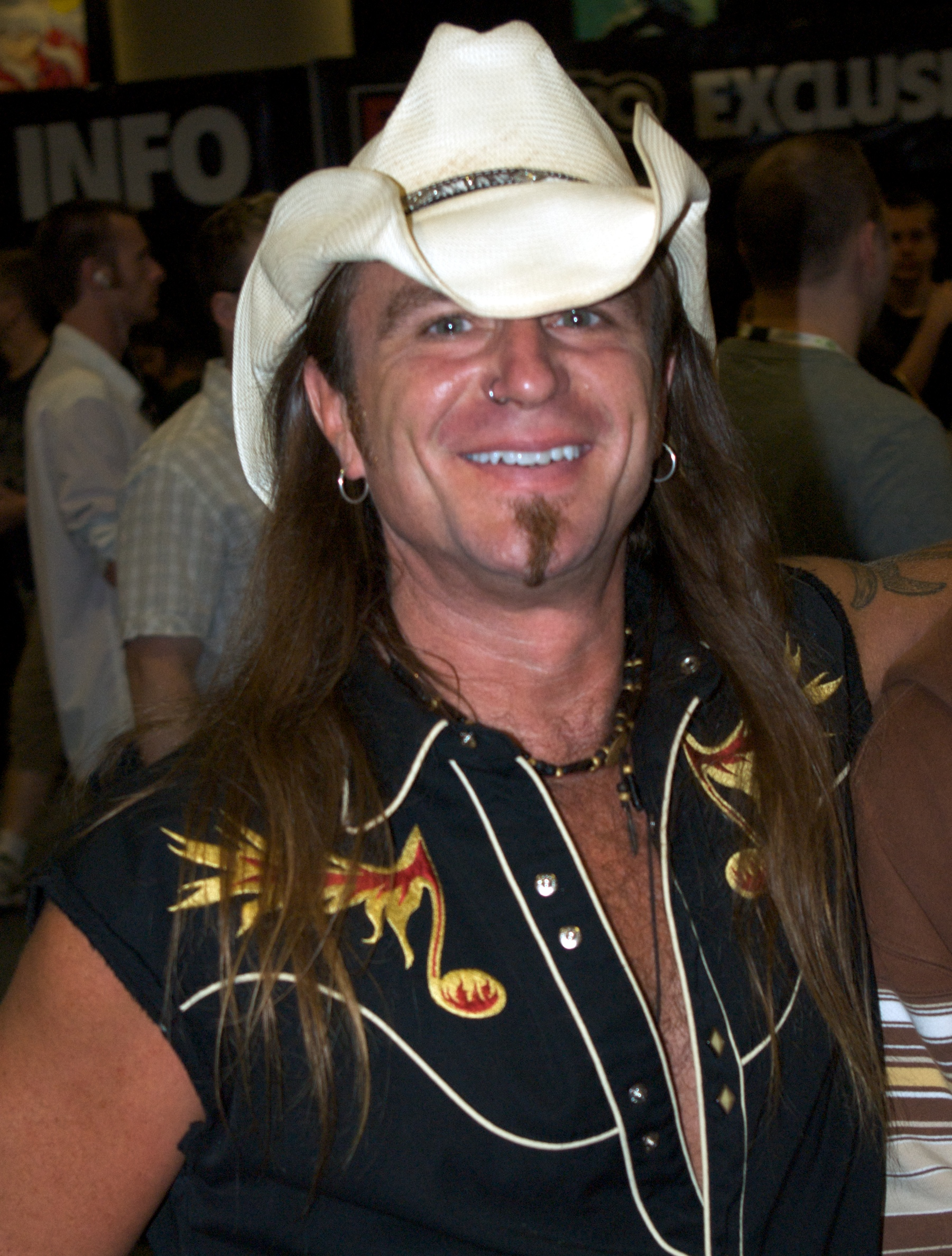
- McNeil at the 2009 Fan Expo Canada
- Born: Vancouver, British Columbia, Canada
- Occupation: Actor
- Years active: 1987–present

Scott McNeil is a Canadian actor, known for his live-action work as well as his roles in animation. His voice roles include: Ace the Bat-Hound in Krypto the Superdog, Voltar in League of Super Evil, Jetfire, Backstop, Strongarm, Snarl and Omega Surpreme in The Unicron Trilogy, Rattrap, Waspinator, Silverbolt and Dinobot in Beast Wars: Transformers and Beast Machines: Transformers, Hack in ReBoot, Wolverine in X-Men: Evolution, Duo Maxwell in Mobile Suit Gundam Wing, Kōga in Inuyasha and the Hohenheim of Light in Fullmetal Alchemist.

== Early life ==
McNeil was born in Vancouver, British Columbia, shortly after being born his parents briefly moved to Brisbane, Australia, before returning to Vancouver when he was four years old. He first appeared on stage at the age of three.

McNeil first learned that people were paid to do different voices after a trip to Disneyland when he was twelve, when he learned that Paul Frees, who provided the voice greeting visitors to the Haunted Mansion, was also the voice of the Pillsbury Doughboy.

McNeil later pursued theatre, studying at Studio 58 before leaving to find acting jobs, working as an Elvis impersonator for some time. He began a career in voice acting in the late 1980s; a casting director at the time told McNeil that he wished he had met him a week before, when he was casting for G.I. Joe: A Real American Hero.

== Professional career ==
McNeil has stated that his first role was providing voices on The New Adventures of He-Man. His first anime role was in Project A-ko, where he provided the voices for three women.

After appearing in several films and two episodes of Highlander: The Series, he provided voices for Beast Wars as Waspinator, Dinobot, Rattrap, and Silverbolt, which he has described as the work he is most proud of. In Dragon Ball Z, he was cast as the original voice of Piccolo and various other characters before providing the voice of Duo Maxwell on Mobile Suit Gundam Wing and Principal Kuno on Ranma ½.

He was later cast as Wolverine in X-Men: Evolution, a role which he voiced for four seasons from 2000 to 2003. McNeil was then cast in Inuyasha as Kōga, also providing the voice of Hohenheim of Light in Fullmetal Alchemist, Foghorn Leghorn in Baby Looney Tunes, Grumpy Bear in Care Bears: Adventures in Care-a-Lot, Ace the Bat-Hound and Ignatius in Krypto the Superdog, Amergan, Gregor, and the lab director in Highlander: The Search for Vengeance, and Stork in Storm Hawks. He also appears in live-action work, appearing in Scooby-Doo 2: Monsters Unleashed and The Green Chain. In October 2007, McNeil estimated that he had voiced 8,500 characters.

He says that he is inspired by Paul Frees, Maurice LaMarche and Mel Blanc, and that he would "fan boy all over him" if he had the opportunity to meet Blanc.

== Filmography ==
=== Japanese and Korean animation dubbing ===
- Adieu Galaxy Express 999 — Captain Harlock
- Beyblade Burst Evolution — Raul Comas (ep. 1-20)
- Black Lagoon — Verrocchio. Chinese Man
- Black Lagoon: The Second Barrage - Verrocchio
- A Chinese Ghost Story: The Tsui Hark Animation — Solid Gold
- Dragon Ball Z — Piccolo, Majin Buu, Old Supreme Kai, Android 16, Dr. Brief, Jeice, Turtle, South Kai, Dabura, Killa, Mercenary Tao, Caroni, Farmer, King Piccolo, Mez (FUNimation-Saban dub and Westwood Media dub produced by Ocean Productions)
- Dragon Ball Z: Dead Zone — Piccolo (FUNimation-Pioneer dub)
- Dragon Ball Z: The Tree of Might — Piccolo, Daiz (1997 FUNimation-Saban TV dub)
- Dragon Ball Z: The Tree of Might — Piccolo, Daiz, Rasin, Oolong (1998 FUNimation-Pioneer video dub)
- Dragon Ball Z: The World's Strongest — Piccolo, Turtle (FUNimation-Pioneer dub)
- Dragon Drive — Saizou Toki, Magna
- Dragon Warrior — General Rudolph
- Elemental Gelade — Beazon
- Fullmetal Alchemist — Hohenheim of Light
- Fullmetal Alchemist the Movie: Conqueror of Shamballa — Hohenheim of Light
- Galaxy Express 999 — Captain Harlock
- Hakkenden: Legend of the Dog Warriors — Hachiro T. Kanamari, Motofuji Hikita
- Hello Carbot — Dandy
- Hamtaro — Ichiro Yamada and Chairman Inatori
- Highlander: The Search for Vengeance — Amergan, Gregor, Lab Director
- Inuyasha — Kōga, additional voices
- Inuyasha: The Final Act — Kōga, Meiōjū
- Jin-Roh: The Wolf Brigade
- Let's Go Quintuplets — Father
- Master Keaton — Colonel Fox, Walter
- Master Keaton (OVA version) — Colonel Fox, Morris
- MegaMan NT Warrior — Guts Man, Cut Man, Tora, King Man
- MegaMan NT Warrior: Axess — Shade Man, Savage Man, Guts Man
- Mega Man: Upon a Star — Dr. Wily, Beat
- Mix Master — Prince Brad, Mayor Charles, Motabi, Pirostar, Ajakdevil, Twistunga
- Mobile Suit Gundam — Teniente Reed
- Mobile Suit Gundam: Char's Counterattack — Londo Bell Technician, Lyle, Shuttle Pilot
- Mobile Suit Gundam 00 — Ali Al-Saachez, Daryl Dodge, Captain, Kinue's Boss, Kinue's Staff, Vice Minister of Foreign Affairs
- Mobile Suit Gundam SEED — Captain Koopman, Gerard Garcia, Kojiro Murdoch
- Mobile Suit Gundam SEED Destiny — Unato Ema Seiran, Glasgow
- Mobile Suit Gundam Wing — Duo Maxwell, Old Man
- Monster Rancher — Suezo, Gali, Gray Wolf, Naga, Captain Black Dino
- Night Warriors: Darkstalkers' Revenge — Lord Raptor
- One Piece — Shiki (Episode 429, Funimation dub)
- One Piece Film: Strong World — Shiki
- Powerpuff Girls Z — Fuzzy Lumpkins, Emo Hendrix, Giant Panda-Mask
- Project A-ko 2: Plot of the Daitokuji Financial Group — Captain Napolipolita, Kei Yuki
- Ranma ½ — Principal Kuno, Daitokuji Kimiyasu, Ushinnosuke Oshamanbe
- Saber Marionette J — Rinzo
- Sanctuary — Tokai
- Samurai 7 — Tanomo
- Shakugan No Shana — Orgon
- Sleeping Beauty
- Sword of the Stranger — Luo Lang
- The Story of Saiunkoku — Official Wa, Seikan Gang Boss
- Tico of the Seven Seas
- Transformers: Armada — Jetfire
- Transformers: Cybertron — Backstop, Snarl
- Transformers: Energon — Jetfire, Strongarm
- Tobot — Tobot W
- Ultimate Teacher — Ganbachai Chabane, Umekichi
- The Vision of Escaflowne — Jajuka, King Aston
- Zoids: Fuzors — Reynard, Vareth, Male TV Announcer
- Zoids: New Century Zero — Stigma Stoeller, Major Polta

=== Film ===
Year	Title	Role	Notes
1994	G.I. Joe: Sgt. Savage and His Screaming Eagles	Sgt. Savage, Cobra Commander	
1996	Super Kid	Judogwi	English dub
1996	Adventures of Mowgli	Shere Khan	English dub
1997	The Fearless Four	Additional voices	English dub
1997	Warriors of Virtue	Yun	
1998	Camelot: The Legend	Lancelot, Bruce	
1998	Once Upon a Tune	Frankie, Beastly	
2000	Robin and the Dreamweavers	Sass, Short Goon, Booth, Black-haired Punk	
2000	Lion of Oz	Gloom	
2000	Grandma Got Run Over by a Reindeer	Policeman	
2000	Casper's Haunted Christmas	Stretch, Noel Jollimore	Direct-to-video
2000	Help! I'm a Fish	Seabass	English dub
2001	Rudolph the Red-Nosed Reindeer and the Island of Misfit Toys	Hermey, Yukon Cornelius, Comet	
2003	G.I. Joe: Spy Troops	Destro	Direct-to-video
2003	Barbie of Swan Lake	Peddler	
2003	Ben Hur	Jesus Christ, Number 59, Art Instructor	
2003	Bionicle: Mask of Light	Toa Tahu, Toa Onua, Graalok	Direct-to-video
2003	Scary Godmother: Halloween Spooktakular	Skully Pettibone, Count Max	Television film
2003	Hot Wheels: World Race	Rekkas	Direct-to-video
2003	Jester Till	Pickelhauber, Baker	
2004	My Scene: Jammin' in Jamaica	Russell Bostick, Fortune Star Guy	
2004	Stellaluna	Horatio	Direct-to-video
2004	G.I. Joe: Valor vs. Venom	Destro, Gung-Ho, B.A.T.	Direct-to-video
2004	¡Mucha Lucha!: The Return of El Maléfico	Vegas Performer, Shoeshine Man, Sr. Hasbeena, Minotoro	Direct-to-video
2004	In Search of Santa	Mortmottimes, Bubkus Bill, Timebomb Tom	
2005	Candy Land: The Great Lollipop Adventure	King Candy	Direct-to-video
2005	Barbie: Fairytopia	Ruby	Direct-to-video
2005	Ark	Quinn	
2005	Dragons II: The Metal Ages	Stendhal, Gryndel	Television film
2005	Scary Godmother: The Revenge of Jimmy	Skully Pettibone, Count Max, Jimmy's Dad	Television film
2005	Bionicle 3: Web of Shadows	Keetongu, Rahaga Bomonga	Direct-to-video
2005	Action Man: X Mission– The Movie	Gangrene, X-Robot 312, Commando 1	Direct-to-video
2005	Kong: King of Atlantis	King Kong, Tan, Minion	
2006	Kong: Return to the Jungle	King Kong, Tan	
2006	Hammer & Tickle	Nikita Khrushchev	
2007	Mosaic	Landlord, Mr. Bullwraith	Direct-to-video
2007	The Condor	Dogg	Direct-to-video
2007	Care Bears: Oopsy Does It!	Grumpy Bear	
2007	The Ten Commandments	Seti	
2008	Barbie and the Diamond Castle	Troll	Direct-to-video
2008	Edison and Leo	Batchelor	
2009	Sing Along with Barbie	Additional voices	
2010	Strawberry Shortcake: The Berryfest Princess Movie	Postmaster Bee	
2010	Barbie in A Mermaid Tale	Syrenka's Pet Fish	Direct-to-video
2010	Care Bears: To the Rescue	Grumpy Bear	
2010	Care Bears: Share Bear Shines	Grumpy Bear	
2013	The Princess Twins of Legendale	Cassi, Lettam, Jibber, Henchman	
2014	Asterix and Obelix: Mansion of the Gods	Goth	
2016	Ghost Patrol	Colonel Geist, Pompous Artiste	Television film
2016	Red Sonja: Queen of Plagues	Bazrat, Tiath	
2016	Howard Lovecraft and the Frozen Kingdom	Barry, Govlins	
2017	Howard Lovecraft and the Undersea Kingdom	Dagon, Barry	
2017	Woody Woodpecker	Nate Grimes	Direct-to-video
2018	Howard Lovecraft and the Kingdom of Madness	Hamish Rice, Govlins	
2021	Panda vs. Aliens	Duke	

=== Western animation roles ===
- 1,001 Nights — Maymoon
- 3 Friends and Jerry — Principal
- Aaagh! It's the Mr. Hell Show! — Carlos, Elf, Jimmy Stewart, Ostrich, Fish Agent, Interviewed Bystander, Dorian Gray
- Action Man — Additional voices
- Adventures of Sonic the Hedgehog — MacHopper
- Animated Classic Showcase — Additional voices
- A Tale of Two Kitties — Chester, Buster
- Baby Looney Tunes — Baby Foghorn
- Beast Machines — Rattrap, Silverbolt, Waspinator
- Beast Wars — Rattrap, Dinobot, Waspinator, Silverbolt, Cicadacon
- Being Ian — Additional voices
- Billy the Cat — Blackie's Henchcat #2
- Bob the Builder (2015)
- Broken Saints — Mars, Osama
- Bucky O'Hare and the Toad Wars! — Dexter, Frax, Sly Leezard, Deadeye Duck, Digger McSquint
- Capertown Cops — Mayor Kickback
- Care Bears: Adventures in Care-a-Lot — Grumpy Bear
- Care Bears: The Giving Festival — Grumpy Bear
- Christopher the Christmas Tree - Additional voices
- Class of the Titans — Atlas, Antaeus
- Coconut Fred's Fruit Salad Island! — Chief Canteloupeibal, Sushimanaut, Mr. Eyeball
- Conan the Adventurer — Wrath-Amon, Zula, Ram-Amon, Misha, Yin Doo
- D'Myna Leagues — Jackie Mungo, Big Tree Powell, Sheriff Hamhock
- Darkstalkers — Anakaris, Lord Raptor, Rikuo
- Dinobabies — Dak, Trip-taking Dinosaur 2
- Dinotrux — Split the Ankylodump
- Dog City — Sherlock Bones
- Donner — Elf DJ, Oiled Elf, Vocal Coach, Tubby, Brock
- Dragon Booster — Cain
- Dragon Tales — Captain Scallywag, Speedy, Sid Sycamore, Arlo, Green Hat Mefirst Wizard Head
- Edgar & Ellen — Grandfather
- Exchange Student Zero — Lionel, Headmaster, King Karuta
- Exosquad — Additional voices
- Extreme Dinosaurs — T-Bone
- Fantastic Four: World's Greatest Heroes — Annihilus
- Fat Dog Mendoza — Additional voices
- Firehouse Tales — Additional voices
- Funky Fables — Various voices
- Generation O! — Nub
- George of the Jungle — Beefy Ape
- Geronimo Stilton — Professor Cheeseweel, William Shortpaws, Franz Ravenrat, Professor Hier O'Glyph
- G.I. Joe: A Real American Hero — Cobra Commander, Freefall, Lt. Falcon, Skymate, Storm Shadow, Headman, Interrogator, Cobra Troopers
- G.I. Joe Extreme — Cobra Commander
- He-Man and the Masters of the Universe — Mer-Man, Beast Man, Stratos, Ram-Man, Clawful, Kobra Khan, Calix
- Hero: 108 - Hurricane Lee, Twin Masters, Stingray King, Commander of Darkness (Season 2), Bartley, Beetle King
- Heroes on Hot Wheels — Steve Warson, Bob Cramer, additional voices
- Hot Wheels Battle Force 5 — Grimian, Master Takeyasu, Tromp, Bruterax
- Hot Wheels Highway 35 World Race — Rekkas, Dan Dresden
- Hulk Vs. — Additional voices
- Hurricanes — Cal Casey, Genghis Khan
- Johnny Test (2005) — Mr. White, additional voices
- Johnny Test (2021) — Zizrar, Construction Drone
- Kid vs. Kat — Agent Fudge Ripple
- King Arthur and the Knights of Justice — Sir Lancelot, Sir Tone, Warlord Blackwing, Warlord Axe
- Kong: The Animated Series — Tan, Omar, Kong
- Krypto the Superdog — Ace, Ignatius
- League of Super Evil — Voltar, additional voices
- Little Red Riding Hood — Wolf
- Littlest Pet Shop — Additional voices
- Madeline — Additional voices
- Martha Speaks — Computer Folder
- Martin Mystery — You do Voodoo
- Max Steel — Klean Kal
- Max Steel: Countdown — Elementor
- Max Steel: Forces of Nature — Elementor
- Mega Man — Dr. Wily, Proto Man, Eddie
- Monkey Magic — Lord Refang, Milesight, Guardian, South General
- Monster Mash — Wolf
- ¡Mucha Lucha! — Heavy Traffic, Sr. Hasbeena, Francisco of The Forest, Minotoro
- Mummies Alive! — Rath, Set, Bob
- My Little Pony (Generation 4):
  - My Little Pony: Friendship Is Magic — Flam, Chief Thunderhooves, Black Stone
  - My Little Pony: Best Gift Ever — Flam
  - My Little Pony: Equestria Girls – Holidays Unwrapped - Flam
  - My Little Pony: Equestria Girls – Rollercoaster of Friendship - Flam
  - My Little Pony: Pony Life — Flam
- NASCAR Racers — Lyle "The Collector" Owens
- Ninjago — Overlord, Nadakhan, Clouse, Karlof
- Pac-Man and the Ghostly Adventures — Additional voices
- Pirate Express — Hades
- Pucca — Lazlo Gazlodivich, Ruby's Dad, Texas Lugie, Yuni, Ice Cream Man, Shaman
- ReBoot — Hack (seasons 2 and 3), additional voices
- ReBoot: Daemon Rising — Hack
- ReBoot: My Two Bobs — Hack
- Ricky Sprocket: Showbiz Boy — Mr. Fischburger
- RoboCop: Alpha Commando — Additional voices
- RollBots — Lance
- Roswell Conspiracies: Aliens, Myths and Legends — Ruck
- Sabrina: The Animated Series — Additional voices
- Santa Mouse and the Ratdeer — Loopy
- Salty's Lighthouse — Zorran, Zak, Zug, Bluenose, Boomer, Fultan Ferry
- Shadow Raiders — Pelvus, Blokk
- Sherlock Holmes in the 22nd Century — Additional voices
- Shezow — Mark Monroe, Wildtiger
- Sitting Ducks — Arnold the Alligator
- Slugterra — Mr. Saturday, Howard, André Geyser
- Spider-Man Unlimited — Vulture, Man-Wolf
- Storm Hawks — Stork, Repton, Leugey, additional voices
- Strawberry Shortcake's Berry Bitty Adventures — Postmaster Bee, Clem Cricket, Berrykin Ed
- Superbook — Samuel, Phicol
- Supernoobs — Mr. Roachmont, General Blorgon, additional voices
- Sushi Pack — Wasabi Pow, Fugu
- The Adventures of Corduroy — Stinky Fungus
- The Adventures of T-Rex — Bubba, Addar
- The Baby Huey Show — Additional voices
- The Christmas Orange — Lenny the Elf Foreman
- The Cramp Twins — Additional voices
- The Deep — Captain Chadwick, Bruce
- The Little Prince — Captain
- The New Adventures of He-Man — Butthead, Captain Zang, Krex, Flipshot
- The Twisted Whiskers Show — Goosers, Von Ripper, Yawp, Dine, Gasper, Ird, Sinister Squirrel
- The Wacky World of Tex Avery — Amanda Banshee
- Timothy Tweedle: The First Christmas Elf — Muffin
- Tom and Jerry Tales — Uncle Pecos, Rocker Shop Owner
- Troll Tales — Flobbergob the troll
- Vor-Tech: Undercover Conversion Squad — Stinger, The Car
- Weird-Ohs — Daddy-O Chassis, Davey, Killer McBash
- Where My Dogs At? — Russell Crowe, Joel Madden (uncredited)
- Wolverine: Weapon X — Deathlok, The Thing
- X-Men: Evolution — Wolverine
- Yakkity Yak — Professor Crazyhair
- The Zula Patrol — Additional voices

=== Live-action roles ===
- The Commish — Jeff Surnac
- Crackerjack — Rex
- Damage — Chip
- The Flash — Julius (Season 1, Episode 12)
- The Green Chain — Ben Holm
- The Guard — Pony
- Highlander: The Series — Dennis, Robert McLeod
- Hope Island — Dee-Dee, Barnabus
- I Was a Teenage Faust — Temptor
- Neon Rider — Photographer
- Ninja Turtles: The Next Mutation — Simon Bonesteel
- Outer Limits — Astronaut, Dino (voice)
- Psych — Rip
- The Ranch — Douglas
- Riverdale — Gerald "Tall Boy" Petite
- Sanctuary — Birot
- Scooby-Doo 2: Monsters Unleashed — Evil Masked Figure
- The Sentinel — Lane Cassidy
- Sleeping Dogs — Harry Maxwell
- Sleeping with Strangers — Todd Warren
- Stargate SG-1 — Kefflin, Townsperson
- Strange Frequency — Robbie Laine
- Street Justice — Crackhouse Junkie
- Supernatural — Benny Sutton
- Tasmanian Devils — Whitfield
- 12 Hours to Live — Victor Kirk
- Viper — Judd

=== Video games ===
- Barbie Horse Adventures: Riding Camp — Jake Lockwood, Fisherman Bob
- Candy Land DVD Game - King Candy
- Crypt of the Necrodancer — Eli
- Def Jam: Fight for NY — Hero (Cocky)
- Dead Rising 2 — Antoine Thomas, Big Earl Flaherty
- Dead Rising 4 — Evos
- Dragon Tales: Learn & Fly With Dragons — Arlo
- Dungeons and Dragons Online — Dungeon Master, Narrator
- Dynasty Warriors: Gundam 2 — Soldier, Gym Gingham (English dub)
- Dynasty Warriors: Gundam 3 — Gym Gingham, Duo Maxwell (English dub)
- Far Cry 5 — Additional voices
- Frogger: Ancient Shadow — Finnius, Lumpy
- Frogger Beyond — Lumpy, Hi-Tech Elder
- Frogger's Adventures: The Rescue — Lumpy, Dr. Frog
- George of the Jungle and the Search for the Secret - Slappy
- The Godfather: The Game — Trojan
- He-Man: Defender of Grayskull — Beast Man
- Inuyasha: A Feudal Fairy Tale — Kōga (English dub)
- Inuyasha: The Secret of the Cursed Mask — Kōga
- Inuyasha: Feudal Combat – Kōga (English dub)
- Mobile Suit Gundam: Encounters in Space — Luce Kassel (English dub)
- Need for Speed Heat — Police Officer
- ReBoot — Hack, Binome 3, Mainframe CPU Officer, Charlton Heston Binome
- Scooby-Doo 2: Monsters Unleashed: The Video Game — Evil Masked Figure
- Tooth and Tail — Archimedes
- Transformers: Beast Wars Transmetals — Rattrap, Silverbolt, Waspinator
- Under the Skin — Carlos Oliveira
- Warhammer 40,000: Dawn of War — Lord Bale, Space Marine Sergeant Mattias, Daemon Prince, Sindri Myr, Matiel, Servitors
- Warhammer 40,000: Dawn of War – Winter Assault — Chaplain Varnus, Imperial Guardsmen, Heavy Weapons Platoons, Kasrkin Squad, Ogryns, Chimeras, Sentinels, Hellhounds, Basilisks, Baneblades
- Warhammer 40,000: Dawn of War – Dark Crusade — Davian Thule, Gregor Vash
- Warhammer 40,000: Dawn of War – Soulstorm
- Warhammer 40,000: Dawn of War II – Chaos Rising — Chaos Sorcerers
- Warhammer 40,000: Dawn of War II – Retribution — Neroth, Sergeant Merrick
- World of Warcraft: Warlords of Draenor — Durotan
- Ys: The Ark of Napishtim — Raba, Mannan, Toksa, Ryug, Cloa, Emilio, Mikhail, Naphishtim

=== Commercials ===
- Kids' WB — Sr. Hasbeena, Wolverine
