= Max Steel: Forces of Nature =

- Directed by: Sean Sullivan
- Written by: Dean Stefan
- Produced by: Ian Richter
- Starring: Christian Campbell; Scott McNeil; Kathleen Barr; Meghan Black; Alessandro Juliani; Michael Donovan
- Production company: Mainframe Entertainment
- Distributed by: Mattel Entertainment
- Release date: 2005
- Running time: 50 minutes
- Country: Canada
- Language: English

Max Steel: Forces of Nature is a 2005 animated science fiction action film based on the TV series and action figure line of the same name. It is the sequel to Max Steel: Endangered Species (2004).

A sequel, titled Max Steel: Countdown, was released in 2006.

== Plot ==
In this movie, Jefferson Smith gets to Bio-Con's base. There he finds several Bio-Con's creations in stasis, most of them failed experiments, with an exception: one of them, codenamed Elementor, wakes up and looks for five different Elementium Isotopes stored in different locations. Each isotope grants hims the power to control and mimic one specific element: Earth, Water, Air, and Fire (Bio-Con used the Water Isotope to mutate his clone with). Once in possession of these 4 Isotopes, the power to control Metal and Ice is granted as an extra bonus. One by one, Elementor absorbs the Isotopes and gains new powers. Then Jefferson puts Max under arrest, but Max is able to break free, while Elementor attacks N-Tek saying he wants Steel or he will destroy the base. Max and Jeff find a way to escape but before they succeed, Jefferson reveals to Max that years ago after he was transformed into Max Steel in order to save his life the 5th Elementium Isotope was placed inside Max's body (when he was given transfasic energy), and that is why he put him under house arrest since no one knows what will happen if the last Isotope is removed or extracted from his body. Max Steel fights Elementor who uses his new abilities to his advantage. After a brief confrontation with Elementor, Berto and Kat discovers that the fifth isotope makes the others go haywire, so Max decides to confront Elementor instead of running away. At the final battle, Max releases all of the power of the 5th Isotope until its overcharge destroys Elementor.

== Cast ==
- Christian Campbell as Max Steel
- Scott McNeil as Elementor, Jefferson Smith and a male tour guide
- Alessandro Juliani as 'Berto
- Meghan Black as Kat
- Kathleen Barr as a female tourist and a radio anchorwoman
- Michael Donovan as various agents and scientists

== Continuity change ==
Is this film, the continuity is altered, as well as the movies. In the TV series, Josh was outside N-Tek when he noticed someone sneaking around, he followed him. Later, Josh is captured and handcuffed by N-Tek agents. The suspect escapes, and Josh does too. Josh follows the man and sees him standing in front of a glass container, full of green goo. Josh sees the thief is stealing some of the substance. After the intruder sees Josh, they fight. Eventually, Josh kicks the man's face, it is revealed to be a metal face (the man is Psycho). Psycho kicks Josh back, then fires his laser at Josh. The blast misses Josh, but hits the container, shattering the glass and the green liquid spills all over Josh. Psycho leaves, thinking Josh will die. The green blobs is actually nanomachines, known to the company as "Nano-Probes". Later, 'Berto tells Josh's father that the probes are dying, and need trasphasic energy to survive. Jeff finds it too risky, but Josh tells him to. The transphasic energy saves Josh. However, it also gives him the ability to change appearances and gives him superpowers. Thus, the creation of "Max Steel." In the movie, it is stated that Josh has suffered from an accident (the "accident" is never said). He is dying, so some scientists tell Jeff that Josh will need transphasic energy. Jeff allows them. However, it doesn't work. Jeff then decides to try the 5th Elementium isotope, the scientist declines, but Jeff demands. The isotope works, saving Josh's life which concludes to the fact that the 5th isotope has kept Max alive for years by giving his Nano-Probes all the unlimited transfasic energy. Without it, his Nano-Probes would starve and kill him.

== Action figures ==
This movie marks the first time an action figure is made of Elementor, the new villain.
