= Max Steel =

Mattel media franchise

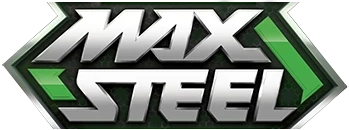
- Owner: Mattel
- Years: 1999–2012, 2013–2022

Print publications
- Graphic novels: The Parasites; Hero Overload; Haywire

Films and television
- Film: Max Steel
- Animated series: Max Steel (2000); Turbo Missions; Max Steel (2013)
- Direct-to-video: Endangered Species; Forces of Nature; Countdown; Dark Rival; Bio Crisis; The Mutant Menace; The Toxic Legion; Makino's Revenge; Monstrous Alliance

Games
- Video game: Max Steel: Covert Missions

Miscellaneous
- Toy: Action figures

Official website
- mattel.com/max-steel

Max Steel is an American media franchise produced and owned by Mattel. Originally a line of action figures sold from 1999 to 2022, it expanded into animated and live-action films, animated television series, comics, and video games.

The original Max Steel animated series aired from 2000 to 2002, followed by nine direct-to-video films released annually from 2004 to 2012. After the September 11 attacks, the line faded in the United States but became a blockbuster in South America. Mattel revived the brand in 2013 with a rebooted series on Disney XD and a 2016 live-action film, which was a universally panned box office bomb.

== Toy line ==
Mattel introduced the Max Steel action-figure line in October 1999, ahead of the animated series's 2000 premiere; the earliest figures bore little resemblance to the show's character. The figures recalled Hasbro's 12-inch G.I. Joe line, with most sets pairing versions of Max Steel with one or two villains and vehicles. Mattel pitched the 12-inch figure against Hasbro's Action Man in a bid to revive the market for "realistic" boys' action figures; the lines were priced from $9.99 to $30, and in a best-case year each was projected to generate $100–150 million in sales. After the September 11 attacks, Mattel scaled back its U.S. promotion of the line, whose espionage- and terrorism-themed play patterns it considered too dark for children; the brand faded in the United States but became a blockbuster in South America, where, according to Mattel, it outsold the company's Hot Wheels and Barbie lines.

The original line ran until 2012. Mattel relaunched the dormant brand in 2013 as a multimedia-first franchise modeled on its Monster High line, leading with a website, an animated series, and graphic novels before redesigned toys returned to stores, with molded-in detail replacing the originals' cloth clothing and snap-on accessories. The line was discontinued in 2022.

== Television ==
Netter Digital Entertainment produced the first animated series, built around Josh McGrath, a 19-year-old who gains super-powers and can transform into Max Steel. Kids' WB! ordered 13 episodes of the 3D CGI series for a January 2000 debut, and it premiered at number one in its time slot, scoring a 7.6 rating and 24 share among boys aged 6 to 11. Josh works as an agent of the secret organization N-Tek against the rival group DREAD; his origin, shown in flashback, has him accidentally infected by experimental nanoprobes that N-Tek stabilizes with "transphasic energy," giving him the ability to transform into the stronger Max Steel.

The series ran for three seasons from 2000 to 2002, with production passing from Netter Digital to Foundation Imaging and then Mainframe Entertainment. A re-imagining with the same title premiered on Disney XD on March 25, 2013. Mattel co-produced the 26-episode series with FremantleMedia Enterprises, which handled its rollout across more than 100 territories. In the reboot, the lead is renamed Maxwell "Max" McGrath, who generates unstable "Tachyon Unlimited Radiant Bio-Optimized" (TURBO) energy and stabilizes it by merging with an alien Ultralink named Steel to become Max Steel.

=== Accolades ===
Max Steel was nominated at the British Academy Children's Awards in the "BAFTA Kids' Vote – Television" category.

== Films ==
=== Direct-to-video films ===
Mattel released a series of direct-to-video animated films annually from 2004 to 2012, followed by further animated films through 2017.

Title	Year	Runtime	Generation
Endangered Species	2004	70 minutes	Original series
Forces of Nature	2005	50 minutes	Original series
Countdown	2006	50 minutes	Original series
Dark Rival	2007	50 minutes	Original series
Bio Crisis	2008	50 minutes	Original series
The Mutant Menace	2009	50 minutes	Original series
The Toxic Legion	2010	50 minutes	Original series
Makino's Revenge	2011	50 minutes	Original series
The Wrath of Makino	2015	45 minutes	Reboot series
The Dawn of Morphos	2015	45 minutes	Reboot series
Maximum Morphos	2015	45 minutes	Reboot series
Team Turbo	2016	45 minutes	Reboot series
Team Turbo Fusion-Tek	2016	65 minutes	Reboot series
Turbo-Charged	2017	45 minutes	Reboot series
Turbo-Warriors	2017	45 minutes	Reboot series

=== Miniseries ===
Year	Title	No. of episodes	Runtime
2012	Monstrous Alliance	6 episodes	12–13 minutes

=== Live-action film ===
In July 2009, Paramount Pictures and producer Joe Roth optioned the film rights for a planned live-action adaptation. That December, Paramount cast Taylor Lautner in the lead role as Josh McGrath. However, by March 2010, Lautner had dropped out of the film in favor of Hasbro and Universal's Stretch Armstrong. Due to the relaunch of Max Steel in 2013, all plans for a live action film were suspended. On August 2, 2013, it was revealed that Dolphin Entertainment were working on a Max Steel film. Christopher Yost was announced as writer, whereas Stewart Hendler was confirmed as director. The film follows along the plotline of the reboot and not the original series'. The film was distributed by Open Road Films and was originally planned for released in 2014. On February 6, 2014, the studio had cast Ben Winchell as Max Steel and Ana Villafane as his love interest Sofia Martinez. On April 29, 2014, actor Andy Garcia was cast in the role of Dr. Miles Edwards, a brilliant and mysterious scientist. On May 20, 2014, actor Mike Doyle was cast in a role. The film was released in the United States by Open Road Films on October 14, 2016. It grossed $6.3 million worldwide against a $10 million budget and was a critical failure, holding a 0% approval rating on Rotten Tomatoes from 21 reviews and a score of 22 on Metacritic. Variety's Joe Leydon called it "a ponderous and preposterous sci-fi action-adventure", and The Hollywood Reporter's Frank Scheck called it "as lifeless as the action hero it's based on".

== Comics ==
When the line launched in 1999, Mattel distributed a promotional comic, Take it to the Max, to introduce the character. In 2013, VIZ Media's Perfect Square imprint began a graphic-novel series set in the rebooted continuity with The Parasites, written by The Stuff of Legend co-creator Brian Smith and illustrated by Jan Wijngaard; two further volumes, Hero Overload and Haywire, written by Tom Pinchuk, followed in 2014.

== Video games ==
Mattel Interactive published the video game Max Steel: Covert Missions, developed by Treyarch, for the Dreamcast in December 2000. An online game tied to the toy line later ran on the official Max Steel website, with codes packaged with figures from 2007 to 2011 unlocking in-game missions.
