= War of the Planets =

War of the Planets is a film title which may refer to:

- War of the Planets (1966) (original title: I Diafanoidi Vengono da Marte), an Italian science fiction film from 1966, directed by Antonio Margheriti
- War of the Planets (1977) (original title: Anno zero - Guerra nello spazio), an Italian science fiction film from 1977, directed by Alfonso Brescia

== Other media ==
- The War of the Planets, a 1929 novella by Harl Vincent, the sequel to the same author's The Golden Girl of Munan (1928)
- "War of the Planets", chapter 12 of the 1939 Buck Rogers serial

== See also ==
- Battle of the Planets
- Great Planet War (惑星大戦争, Wakusei Daisensō), the Japanese alternative title of the 1977 Toho tokusatsu science fiction film The War in Space
- War Planets, a toy line from Trendmasters
