= Planet Fire =

Planet Fire may refer to the following fictional planets:

- Fire, in the TV series Lexx
- Fire, in the animated TV series Shadow Raiders
