= ReBoot: Daemon Rising =

2001 film by George Samilski

- Written by: Philip Mitchell; Ian Pearson; Gavin Blair; Ian Weir
- Directed by: George Roman Samilski
- Starring: Sharon Alexander; Giacomo Baessato
- Music by: Bob Buckley
- Country of origin: Canada
- Original language: English

Production
- Producer: Ian Pearson
- Running time: 85 minutes
- Production companies: Alliance Atlantis Communications; Mainframe Entertainment

Original release
- Release: 18 November 2001

Related
- ReBoot: My Two Bobs

ReBoot: Daemon Rising is a 2001 Canadian made-for-TV movie based on the series ReBoot directed by George Samilski. The movie is set after the first three seasons of ReBoot, and along with another ReBoot movie, My Two Bobs, is considered the fourth season. It was originally broadcast in Canada as a film, but was later rebroadcast as 4 individual episodes. Broken down into its component episodes, it is "Daemon Rising", "Cross Nodes", "What's Love Got to Do with It", and "Sacrifice". It was released on DVD along with My Two Bobs.

== Plot ==
A Super Virus known as Daemon has taken over the Super Computer, and is trying to infect the entire Net. Despite being a virus, she is not malevolent, and only wants to bring order to the Net. To this end, she uses her infection, which the infected call 'The Word', to brainwash everyone she comes into contact with. She has already infected all of the Guardian Collective, apart from Bob and Matrix. The Guardians' key tools, which allowed them to open portals to sealed-off systems, left the Guardians when Daemon infected them. Because Bob merged with his key tool, he is the only Guardian who can still create portals, so Daemon makes multiple attempts to capture and infect him.

In the first part of the movie, an army of infected Guardians invade Mainframe. Hexadecimal, now loyal to Bob, helps him remove them from Mainframe without deleting them. In doing so, she uses up so much power that she is reformatted into a Sprite, and becomes enveloped in a null cocoon which the Matrix siblings recognize as their father Welman. In a series of flashbacks, Hex reveals that when Welman activated his Gateway command shortly before Bob arrived on Mainframe, it brought the Super Virus Gigabyte to Mainframe's Twin City. This caused an explosion which nullified Mainframe's Twin City and everyone in it, including Welman, and split Gigabyte into Megabyte and Hexadecimal. Dot convinces Hex to make Welman a new body out of Nulls, then convinces Welman to rebuild his Gateway command.

Mouse, Dot, and Phong manage to seal off a few systems on the Net, and when Daemon activates her infection, which has been lying dormant, all systems besides those become infected. During the course of the battle, Mike the TV, AndrAIa, Matrix, and Mouse become infected, and therefore loyal to Daemon. Since it was Mouse who programmed the firewalls that sealed off systems like Mainframe, Daemon uses Mouse to break into Mainframe, as she needs Bob to help her infect the other sealed-off systems.

After Daemon arrives in Mainframe and infects Bob, she forces him to create portals to those systems, which is slowly killing him. By absorbing the energies of Mainframe's core, Hexadecimal powers back up into a virus again, and uses the energy to fight Daemon. However, her attempts are in vain: Daemon is a Cron virus, and her time has come, so she decompiles herself to initiate the final stage of her infection. This causes everyone she infected to begin a Net-wide binary countdown. When it reaches zero, all the infected will be deleted, and so will the Net. After infecting Little Enzo's icon, Hexadecimal takes a cure to Daemon's infection from Matrix's icon and delivers it to the entire Net using the Gateway command. In essence, Hexadecimal sacrificed herself to cure the entire Net from Daemon's infection.

At the end of the movie, Bob and Dot get engaged. However, a few seconds later, a portal opens, and Ray Tracer and another Bob, this one looking like he did pre-Season 3, step through it, leading to confusion among everybody.

== Cast ==
- Kathleen Barr: Dot Matrix / System
- Ian James Corlett: Bob / Austin Powers User
- Paul Dobson: Matrix (adult Enzo)
- Garry Chalk: Slash / Turbo
- Michael Donovan: Mike the TV / Phong
- Giacomo Baessato: Enzo Matrix
- Scott McNeil: Hack / Specky
- Shirley Millner: Hexadecimal
- Sharon Alexander: AndrAIa
- Michael Benyaer: Young Bob
- Colombe Demers: Daemon
- Stevie Vallance: Mouse
- Dale Wilson: Welman Matrix
- Richard Newman: Daecon
