= Ninjago: Rebooted =

Danish animated television season

- Season 3
- Rebooted poster
- Starring: Jillian Michaels; Vincent Tong; Michael Adamthwaite; Brent Miller; Kirby Morrow; Kelly Metzger; Paul Dobson; Mark Oliver; Jennifer Hayward; Kathleen Barr; Scott McNeil
- No. of episodes: 8

Release
- Original network: Cartoon Network
- Original release: January 29 – November 26, 2014

Season chronology
- ← Previous; Legacy of the Green Ninja Next → Tournament of Elements

Rebooted is the third season of the animated television series Ninjago: Masters of Spinjitzu (retitled Ninjago from the eleventh season onward). The series was created by Michael Hegner and Tommy Andreasen. The season aired from January 29 to November 26, 2014, following the second season, Legacy of the Green Ninja. It is succeeded by the fourth season, Tournament of Elements.

The second season was originally intended to be the final season of the series due to the show and its associated Lego Ninjago product line having been planned as a three-year project. However, due to the strong performance of the television series and feedback from fans within online forums, it was continued with the release of Rebooted.

Although the season is titled Rebooted, it is a continuation of the storyline from the previous seasons, rather than a reboot. The season reintroduces Ninjago City with new advanced technology and features the return of the Overlord in digital form as the season's main antagonist. Rebooted is also the first season to introduce the nindroid character P.I.X.A.L. into the series.

== Voice cast ==
=== Main ===
- Jillian Michaels as Lloyd Garmadon, the Green/Golden Ninja and Elemental Master of Energy
- Vincent Tong as Kai, the Red Ninja and Elemental Master of Fire
- Michael Adamthwaite as Jay, the Blue Ninja and Elemental Master of Lightning
- Brent Miller as Zane, the White Ninja and Elemental Master of Ice
- Kirby Morrow as Cole, the Black Ninja and Elemental Master of Earth
- Kelly Metzger as Nya, Samurai X and Kai's sister
- Paul Dobson as Sensei Wu, the teacher of the ninja
- Mark Oliver as Sensei Garmadon
- Jennifer Hayward as P.I.X.A.L. a female nindroid
- Kathleen Barr as Misako
- Scott McNeil as the Digital Overlord/The Golden Master

=== Supporting ===
- Lee Tockar as Cyrus Borg
- Alan Marriott as Dareth
- Colin Murdock as Ed
- Michael Dobson as Pythor P. Chumsworth
- Richard Newman as General Cryptor
- Ian James Corlett as Skales
- Kathleen Barr as Brad
- Alyssa Swales as Skales Jr.
- Michael Adamthwaite as Mindroid/Mailman
- Jillian Michaels as Fitz Donnegan

== Production ==
=== Direction ===
The Rebooted episodes were directed by Peter Hausner, Martin Skov, Michael Helmuth Hansen, Trylle Vilstrup and Jens Møller.

=== Animation ===
The animation for the third season was produced at Wil Film ApS in Denmark.

== Release ==
The first two episodes of the season titled The Surge and The Art of the Silent Fist were released on Cartoon Network on January 29, 2014. The third and fourth episodes titled Blackout and The Curse of the Golden Master were not released until April 16, 2014. The second half of the season was released in July and November 2014. The episodes were also released in pairs with Enter the Digiverse and Codename: Arcturus being released on July 13, 2014, and The Void and The Titanium Ninja being released on November 26 of the same year.

== Synopsis ==
Inspired from Zane's late father and creator, the ruined Ninjago City was rebuilt by Cyrus Borg into a futuristic metropolis with more advanced technology called New Ninjago City. However, the Overlord survives his defeat and returns as a digital computer virus and took control of all of Borg's technology and got an army of Nindroids. The Digital Overlord with the help from Pythor wants to steal Lloyd's golden powers that made him into the Golden Ninja, The Ninjas must to stop the Digital Overlord from becoming the unstoppable Golden Master, who had once terrorised the Serpentine.

== Episodes ==
No. overall	No. in season	Title	Directed by	Written by	Original release date	U.S. viewers (millions)
27	1	"The Surge"	Peter Hausner	The Hageman Brothers	January 29, 2014	2.04
Cyrus Borg rebuilds ruined Ninjago City as a futuristic metropolis called New Ninjago City, following Overlord's defeat by Lloyd. The Ninjas, Sensei Wu, Nya and Dareth are teachers at Darkley's (now Sensei Wu's Academy) as they travels around New Ninjago City. The Overlord however reemerges, having survived his defeat and enters the Digiverse to take over all technology. Cyrus Borg gives the Ninjas the Techno-Blades and new suits, before both him and Sensei Wu are captured. Borg's assistant, a female nindroid named P.I.X.A.L, who is also taken over by the Digital Overlord, begins the production of a Nindroid Army for the Digital Overlord.
28	2	"The Art of the Silent Fist"	Martin Skov	The Hageman Brothers	January 29, 2014	2.08
Lloyd and the Ninjas retreat from the Nindroids to Sensei Garmadon's monastery, where he teaches them The Art of the Silent Fist. Zane runs into P.I.X.A.L. and uses his Techno-Blade to release her from the Digital Overlord's control. The team is ambushed by the Nindroid Army and is forced to split up. Lloyd and Garmadon visit Nya's Samurai X cave, while the Ninjas infiltrate New Ninjago City's power station to cut off the Digital Overlord's power supply. The destruction of the power station causes all nindroids to shut down along with P.I.X.A.L., with her last words asking Zane if they are "compatible".
29	3	"Blackout"	Michael Helmuth Hansen	The Hageman Brothers	April 16, 2014	2.04
The Digital Overlord's code is saved by a mysterious hooded figure who claims to be an ally. Zane gives half of his power source to revive P.I.X.A.L., while the Ninjas search for a way to return to New Ninjago City and eventually reach Jay's parents' junkyard. At the Junkyard, they are attacked by the hooded figure and a corrupted Sensei Wu. Wu and the hooded figure are defeated, the latter leaving behind a white scale. In the meantime, Lloyd and Garmadon head for Hiroshi's Labyrinth to hide from the Digital Overlord's forces.
30	4	"The Curse of the Golden Master"	Trylle Vilstrup	The Hageman Brothers	April 16, 2014	1.85
The Ninjas journey under New Ninjago City to visit the Serpentine to ask them about the white scale. The Serpentine tell them of the legend of the Golden Master and Skales reveals that only one Serpentine could possibly be the hooded stranger. The Nindroid Army attack and the Ninjas must fight to protect the Serpentine. Lloyd and Garmadon are ambushed by an army of Nindroids in Hiroshi's Labyrinth. Lloyd is cornered by the Nindroid Mechdragon and the hooded stranger, who reveals himself to be Pythor, having survived the Great Devourer.
31	5	"Enter the Digiverse"	Peter Hausner	The Hageman Brothers	July 13, 2014	N/A
Lloyd has been captured by Pythor and is taken away aboard the Mechdragon. The Digital Overlord begins to drain his Golden Power, to regain his physical form and become the Golden Master. The Ninja Team enter the Digiverse to confront the Digital Overlord but as he grows more powerful, he begins to overwhelm them. In the real world, Pythor, Wu, and the Nindroid Army attack Borg Tower, while Garmadon tries to fend them off. The Ninja Team share Lloyd's Golden Power and erases the Digital Overlord from the Digiverse, turning Wu and the corrupted machines in New Ninjago City back to normal. Lloyd narrowly escapes as the Mechdragon, as it plummets into the sea, with the Overlord still inside but finally regained his physical form.
32	6	"Codename: Arcturus"	Michael Helmuth Hansen	The Hageman Brothers	July 13, 2014	N/A
Pythor and the Nindroid Army free the Overlord from the submerged Mechdragon. Wu and Garmadon soon discover that they have devised a plan known as "Project: Arcturus". Kai is dispatched to follow a Nindroid convoy in the X-1 Prototype, but he is captured after a long chase. The Ninja Team regroup and head to the Lost City of Ouroborus to free Kai, where they discover an underground rocket ship. After freeing Kai, the Ninja Team make a last-minute decision to board the rocket as it blasts off into space.
33	7	"The Void"	Jens Møller	The Hageman Brothers	November 26, 2014	2.34
The rocket ship heads into the trail of the Arcturus Comet, where the Nindroid Army seek to recover the remains of the Golden Weapons and the Mega Weapon which has been blasted into space after its last use. The Ninja Team attempt to stop them, but are eventually abandoned on the comet's surface as the Nindroids escape with the gold remains they sought.
34	8	"The Titanium Ninja"	Peter Hausner	The Hageman Brothers	November 26, 2014	2.38
The Nindroid Army melt the remains of the Golden Weapons and the Mega-Weapon into a suit of armor for the Overlord, who has now transformed into the Golden Master. The Ninja Team return to Earth from space to find the Golden Master, now grown to massive size, wreaking havoc on the city. They take refuge in the Temple of Fortitude and devise a plan to shrink the Golden Master with a pill. The plan fails when Pythor swallows the pill instead and the Ninjas are subdued. Zane overloads his power source, sacrificing himself to destroy the Golden Master and all the nindroids once and for all. A memorial service is held for Zane with a statue of himself, which Cyrus Borg called "Titanium Ninja", but P.I.X.A.L. finds out that his consciousness has survived.

== Ratings ==
The third season of Ninjago: Masters of Spinjitzu continued the popularity of the preceding seasons and built on its ratings from the previous years. It consisted of four special events that aired throughout 2014, which averaged triple-digit viewer gains in the categories of children and all boys in comparison to the previous season. The January premiere ranked as the top telecast of the year on basic cable with boys 2-11 and boys 6-11.

== Other media ==
The season was accompanied by the release of associated video and app games. Lego Ninjago Rebooted, was released on January 21, 2014 and is an action game developed for iOS by The Lego Group. Lego Ninjago: Nindroids was released on July 29, 2014 for PlayStation Vita and Nintendo 3DS was developed by Hellbent Games.
