= List of Shadow Raiders characters =

The following is a list of characters from the 1998 animated television series, Shadow Raiders. The series is about four warring planets – Rock, Ice, Fire, and Bone – which raid one another for resources. The main character, a miner called Graveheart voiced by Paul Dobson, is on a mission to forge an interplanetary alliance after receiving a warning from Princess Tekla, the only surviving member of her own planet, about a Beast Planet which threatens to consume their worlds.

== Planet Rock ==
Planet Rock is a planet made up of mostly rocks that contain many types of minerals. The people of the planet look mostly like humans made of stone, with patterns resembling veins of minerals on their bodies and hair that looks like gemstones. Although the Alliance was founded by Graveheart, a man of Rock, Planet Rock is the fourth planet to join, since the planet's ruler Lord Mantle refused to trust the other worlds.

=== Graveheart ===
Graveheart (voiced by Paul Dobson) is initially a miner working for Lord Mantel. After discovering Tekla and being ambushed by Beast Drones on Planet Ice during routine exporting, Graveheart realizes he must step into the leader seat and bring the worlds together to stop a common enemy. He is a very noble, brave man, though he often suffers from lack of self-confidence, deeming himself as just a miner. Formerly a Quarrior, he quit Planet Rock's military when he failed to save his younger brother, Mica, during a raid on Planet Fire.

=== Jade ===
Jade (voiced by Enuka Okuma) is the Captain of the Guard of Planet Rock and Graveheart's best friend and love interest. She is initially the only person from Rock to join the Alliance besides Graveheart, but later brokers a deal that brings the planet into the Alliance. After Lord Mantel's death, Jade becomes the ruler of Planet Rock.

=== Lord Mantel ===
Lord Mantel (voiced by Blu Mankuma) is the ruler of Planet Rock. He is unwavering in his beliefs that Planet Rock is superior to all other planets. This forces him to refuse Rock's participation in the Alliance. He is stubborn and arrogant, but quite well liked on the planet. In exchange for lending the Battle Moons to the Alliance, he has Jade collect information on it and eventually got its command codes. He is eventually killed by Blokk after the Beast Planet invades his planet.

=== Commander Feldspar ===
Feldspar (voiced by Alec Willows) is the commander of Planet Rock's military and guardian to the entrance of Lord Mantel's fortress. He commands Planet Rock's Battle-Moons; he also takes over Jade's duties after she is exiled. During the Beast Planet's invasion, Feldspar is brutally killed by Blokk.

== Planet Ice ==
Planet Ice is made up mostly of ice, which is stolen to be used for water. Its inhabitants resemble bipedal insects made of ice. Most of them keep their secondary pair of arms folded against their backs, and can exhale an icy mist. Planet Ice is the first planet to join the Alliance.

=== King Cryos ===
Cryos (voiced by Mark Oliver) is the king of Planet Ice. Although he seems quiet at a glance, he is very thoughtful and the brains behind the Alliance. He is also one of the founding members, as he was present during the Beast Planet's first incursion into the Cluster and fought alongside Graveheart and Tekla. He believes that peace between all of the worlds can be established, but that everyone must work hard for it. Because of their similar beliefs, Cryos and Graveheart become close friends.

=== Lady Zera ===
Zera (voiced by Tegan Moss) is the daughter of King Cryos. She wishes she could go on adventures like her father and often stows away on his vehicles. She can act quite arrogant at times, but she is actually quite caring and sweet. Jade eventually teaches her how to battle so she can be safe while her father is on Alliance missions and Zera, like her father, is a skilled sharpshooter. Over the course of the series, she becomes close friends with Pyrus, Tekla, and Zuma.

=== Commander Medstar ===
Medstar (voiced by Garry Chalk) is a commander and the highest-ranking member of Planet Ice. He was made king temporarily when Cryos stepped down, but gave the throne back to Cryos just before the fight against Remora.

== Planet Fire ==
Planet Fire is known for its geothermal energy, and is mostly made up of volcanoes and lava pools. The people of Planet Fire resemble mythological salamanders, with webbed feet, spiked ears, and fiery hair, and their art and culture is inspired by that of the Middle East. Planet Fire is the second planet to join the Alliance.

=== Prince Pyrus ===
Pyrus (voiced by Matt Hill) is the prince of Planet Fire. He assumed power at a young age after his father's death. He is generally kind and compassionate, but can revert to a childish mood when set off. Regardless, he always puts the people of his planet first. Pyrus firmly believes in the Alliance and gets on well with almost everyone in it; he is the only one who trusts Femur, looking to Femur as a sort of "cool uncle".

=== The Grand Vizier ===
The Grand Vizier (voiced by Jim Byrnes) is Prince Pyrus' royal counselor and surrogate father. He is a firm believer in old tradition and the way things were in the past, and is very loyal and protective of his prince. After finally being convinced of the worthiness of the other worlds, the Vizier sacrifices himself in an attempt to destroy the Beast Planet.

=== Captain Blaze ===
Blaze (voiced by Michael Dobson) is the captain of the Igneous Knights and Pyrus's personal guard.

== Planet Bone ==
Planet Bone is known for its earth and rich soil and is mostly made up of swamps. The other worlds in the Cluster raided Bone for its nutritious lichen, which is apparently the only reliable food source on any of the four worlds. Bone is ruled by an emperor, and the most common path to the throne is assassination. Bone's people resemble bipedal reptiles or amphibians with dual neural sails running down their backs to the tips of their tails. Their reputation for cowardice is mostly due to the influence of their current emperor. Unlike the other worlds, their technology appears to be mostly organic rather than mechanical. Planet Bone is the third planet to join the Alliance.

=== Emperor Femur ===
Femur (voiced by Garry Chalk) is the emperor of Planet Bone. Despite being self-indulgent, Femur cares for his planet and does indeed think of the citizens of Bone, and he willingly and paternally looks after the last surviving plant from Planet Jungle. Not a fighter by any means, Femur instead chooses to hide in the midst of battle, and in the crucial battle of Remora he led his troops in a retreat when things got rough. He is quite lecherous, particularly towards Jade (much to her disdain). He genuinely cares for Pyrus and serves as a surrogate uncle-type figure, trying to keep him out of battles and being upset at the thought of being assassinated without patching things up with Pyrus.

=== Pelvis ===
Pelvis (voiced by Scott McNeil) is Femur's servant. He is always plotting Femur's demise so he can take the throne for himself, but continually fails to kill him.

=== Sternum ===
Sternum (voiced by John Payne) is Femur's brother and the former emperor of Bone. Rather than risk his brother making an attempt on his life and being the next in line for the throne, Sternum ordered Femur to be executed. Femur then bribed the guards to release him and had Pelvis drug Sternum, thus securing the throne in typical Bone fashion. But instead of killing his brother, Femur had Sternum shipped off to the Prison Planet. After returning to Planet Bone, Sternum appears to reconcile with his brother, though it is not clear who becomes emperor.

== Planet Tek ==
Planet Tek was a cybernetic planet consumed by the Beast Planet's forces in the first episode; as a result, it only appears in a few scenes at the beginning of the series and in flashbacks. The people of planet Tek resemble fully humanoid robots with circuitry for skin. They had apparently been observing the Beast Planet for some time and collected valuable intelligence on it and its capabilities. Apparently lacking the ability to escape in spite of their technology, their response to the Beast Planet was to send out a small number of survivors to warn other worlds and help them mount a defense.

=== Tekla ===
Tekla (voiced by Donna Yamamoto) is the princess and sole survivor of Planet Tek, tasked with warning other worlds of the horror of the Beast Planet. She crash-landed on Planet Ice, where she fought alongside Graveheart and Cryos in their first encounter with the Beast's forces. Tekla was badly damaged in the battle, but not before tasking Graveheart with uniting the worlds of the Cluster against the Beast. Tekla spends most of the first season in a coma, and is later possessed by Lamprey, who attempts to destroy the Alliance. After regaining control of her body, Tekla eagerly participates in Alliance activities and becomes a valuable operative and leader, although she firmly supports Graveheart and resists any attempt to remove him from leadership.

=== Voxx ===
Voxx is a mechanical sphere, apparently an artificial intelligence, that accompanies Tekla and provides her with information. It is capable of firing a weak laser weapon for defense, although late in the series, King Cryos upgrades it significantly.

== The Beast Planet ==
The Beast Planet, often referred to simply as "the Beast", is the main antagonist of the show. It consumes entire planets by extending an enormous claw and dragging the unfortunate world into its own hollow interior. The Beast has a malign intelligence (though it's not clear if it is truly self-aware), and it learns from every world it consumes. Its preferred method of travel is to teleport into a star system through a solar anomaly, but it is capable of moving through normal space when needed, as it does when chasing the Alliance during the second season. In addition to its feeding claw, the Beast Planet is armed with massive null matter cannons and can deploy an enormous number of Beast Drones. Despite these advantages, it relies on its Beast Generals to lead a vanguard that weakens the defenses of target planets, since, as shown in the second season, it is possible for the inhabitants of a world rally and damage it.

=== Blokk ===
Blokk (voiced by Scott McNeil) is a Beast General who relies on brute force and direct assault. He fights with a pair of jagged claws mounted on each forearm or hand-held heavy weapons and is also a skilled fighter pilot. At the end of the series, Blokk invades the underdefended Planet Rock, killing Lord Mantel and several inhabitants before being killed in a battle with Graveheart.

=== Lamprey ===
Lamprey (voiced by Tasha Simms) is a Beast General who prefers more subtle tactics than Blokk, using manipulative diplomacy, spy craft, or simple trickery to prepare worlds for consumption by the Beast. In combat, Lamprey can use the tendrils on her arms as whips or blades, but she sometimes uses a handheld blaster pistol. Lamprey has a reduced role in the second season, presumably because the Alliance is just far enough ahead of the Beast Planet that she can't easily make planetfall to cause trouble.

=== Voyd ===
Voyd is a silent Beast General who outranks (and towers over) Blokk and Lamprey. He doesn't seem to devise any plans of his own, instead simply deciding whether to go with Blokk's plan or Lamprey's. Additionally, he is able to act as an interdimensional transport, teleporting himself, Blokk and Lamprey to and from the Beast Planet and their forward bases when necessary. Following their failures in the first season, Voyd apparently tortured Blokk and Lamprey personally, and grimly oversees Blokk's futile attempts to redeem himself.

=== Beast Drones ===
The Beast Drones are the infantry of the Beast Planet, consisting of null matter condensed in a containment unit. They can be killed easily and instantly by destroying their containment units, but make up for this glaring weakness through sheer numbers and deadly null-matter blasters on their left arms.

== Planet Sand ==
A desert planet with a culture based on ancient Egypt, Planet Sand was encountered by the Alliance during their flight from the Beast Planet, and joined the Alliance when they helped them activate their World Engine. Unlike most planets in the series, Planet Sand was home to two sentient species: the furry, horned, hulking Sand People and the diminutive, hairless Sun People. The Sun People had apparently enslaved the Sand People, believing them to be little more than animals, until the Alliance and the Beast Planet arrived, at which point the Sand People revealed their powerful telekinetic and telepathic abilities. The Sand People were subsequently invited to join the Alliance fully while the Sun People were apparently relegated to an associate role due to their inability to do anything for themselves.

=== Zuma ===
Zuma (voiced by Ellen Kennedy) is a peaceful inhabitant of Planet Sand who possesses telepathic powers and is unfamiliar with other worlds. She was originally Ramset's servant but later became her people's primary representative to the Alliance. She becomes good friends with Lady Zera and soon proves to be a valuable Alliance operative.

=== Ramset ===
Ramset (voiced by Grahame Andrews) is the apparent leader of the Sun People. Like most of his people, he is a small humanoid who moves about in an imposing suit of gold armor.

== Prison Planet ==
=== Jewelia ===
Jewelia (pronounced "Julia", voiced by Janyse Jaud) is a leader of the escaped prisoners of the Prison Planet. She is manipulative, yet charming, and is very accustomed to getting her way. Unlike Sternum and most of the other inhabitants of the Prison Planet, she intends to rule the planet rather than escaping.

== See also ==
- War Planets
- Shadow Raiders
- Trendmasters makers of War Planets
- Mainframe Studios (formerly Mainframe Entertainment), the production company of Shadow Raiders
