= Ninjago: Tournament of Elements =

Danish animated television season

- Season 4
- Tournament of Elements poster
- Starring: Jillian Michaels; Vincent Tong; Michael Adamthwaite; Brent Miller; Kirby Morrow; Kelly Metzger; Paul Dobson; Mark Oliver; Jennifer Hayward; Ian James Corlett
- No. of episodes: 10

Release
- Original network: Cartoon Network
- Original release: February 23 – April 3, 2015

Season chronology
- ← Previous; Rebooted Next → Possession

Tournament of Elements is the fourth season of the animated television series Ninjago: Masters of Spinjitzu (titled Ninjago from the eleventh season onward). The series was created by Michael Hegner and Tommy Andreasen. The season aired from February 23 to April 3, 2015, following the third season titled Rebooted. It is succeeded by the fifth season, titled Possession.

The fourth season follows the storyline of the ninja searching for Zane by competing in Master Chen's Tournament of Elements. The season introduces Master Chen as the main antagonist and also several Elemental Masters into the series, who each have individual elemental powers, such as amber, shadow and smoke. The season marked the first time that two seasons were released in one year, replacing the previous schedule of one season released per year.

== Voice cast ==
=== Main ===
- Jillian Michaels as Lloyd Garmadon, the Green Ninja and Elemental Master of Energy
- Vincent Tong as Kai, the Red Ninja and Elemental Master of Fire
- Michael Adamthwaite as Jay, the Blue Ninja and Elemental Master of Lightning
- Brent Miller as Zane, the White/Titanium Ninja and Elemental Master of Ice
- Kirby Morrow as Cole, the Black Ninja and Elemental Master of Earth
- Kelly Metzger as Nya, Kai's sister
- Paul Dobson as Sensei Wu, the wise teacher of the ninja
- Mark Oliver as Sensei Garmadon
- Jennifer Hayward as P.I.X.A.L., a female nindroid
- Ian James Corlett as Master Chen

=== Supporting ===
- Heather Doerksen as Skylor
- Scott McNeil as Karlof/General Arcturus
- Doron Bell Jr. as Griffin Turner
- Kirby Morrow as Paleman/Gravis (episode 37)
- Andrew Francis as Shade (Shadow)
- Scott McNeil as Clouse
- Kathleen Barr as Misako
- Mark Oliver as Mistaké/Gravis
- Michael Dobson as Pythor P. Chumsworth
- Michael Adamthwaite as Bolobo
- Brent Miller as Ash
- Paul Dobson as Jacob Pevsner/Warden Noble/Rufus McCallister/Neuro
- Ian James Corlett as Tox
- Lee Tockar as Cyrus Borg
- Brian Drummond as Nuckal/Kruncha
- Alan Marriott as Dareth/Captain Soto
- Maryke Handrikese as Camille
- Alessandro Juliani as Kapau
- Ian Hanlin as Chope
- Michael Donovan as Eyezor
- Brian Dobson as Sumo Zumo

== Production ==
=== Development ===
The Hageman Brothers have stated that the season was inspired by the 1973 martial arts film Enter the Dragon. The director of the film Robert Clouse was also the inspiration for the character Clouse, an antagonist in the season.

=== Animation ===
The animation for the fourth season was produced at Wil Film ApS in Denmark.

=== Direction ===
The Tournament of Elements episodes were directed by Trylle Vilstrup, Michael Helmuth Hansen, Jens Møller, Peter Hausner and Per Düring Risager.

== Release ==
The season premiered on Cartoon Network on February 23, 2015 with the release of The Invitation. The subsequent episodes were released across March and April 2015 until the release of the season finale titled The Corridor of Elders on April 3 of the same year.

== Synopsis ==
The ninja heard that Zane is alive with being rebuilt with titanium and they can get him back by entering Master Chen's Tournament of Elements. However, Chen brought the elemental masters into the tournament just to steal their powers. Kai, Chen's daughter Skylor, the ninja, Wu and Garmadon goes against Chen before he releases any Anacondrai Warriors from attacking Ninjago City.

== Episodes ==
No. overall	No. in season	Title	Directed by	Written by	Original release date	U.S. viewers (millions)
35	1	"The Invitation"	Trylle Vilstrup	The Hageman Brothers	February 23, 2015	N/A
After Zane's sacrifice to destroy the Golden Master and all the Nindroids, the Ninja have gone their separate ways to live in their new lifes, with only Lloyd seeking to reunite them. Shortly after coming together at Lloyd's behest, they receive a message that Zane is alive and the Ninja must compete in Master Chen's Tournament of Elements if they wish to see him again. Sensei Garmadon, who knows Chen personally, is suspicious and accompanies the Ninja on their journey to Chen's island. While on the ship, the ninja discover that they aren't the only ones with elemental powers, as there are other descendants of elemental masters such as speed, metal, smoke, nature, gravity, mind, light, amber, form, shadow, poison and sound.
36	2	"Only One Can Remain"	Michael Helmuth Hansen	The Hageman Brothers	March 2, 2015	1.43
Garmadon reveals that he used to train under Chen. Chen greets the Elemental Masters personally, and explains the rules of the Tournament of Elements: In each round, the competitors must obtain a Jade Blade. Those who fail are eliminated. In the preliminary round, there are just enough Jade Blades for all but one elemental master to move on, and Karlof, the master of metal becomes the first to be eliminated. The ninja search for Zane in secret and accidentally witness Chen and his cultists taking Karlof's powers, and learn that he intends to do the same to the other elemental masters.
37	3	"Versus"	Jens Møller	The Hageman Brothers	March 9, 2015	N/A
Since last seen, Zane has rebuilt himself out of titanium, but has lost his memory. He finds P.I.X.A.L. in another room, her body scrapped and her consciousness trapped in a computer. The meeting with P.I.X.A.L. triggers his lost memories and he uploads her on his own hard-drive, before Chen's advisor Clouse catches and tasers him. As the tournament continues, Griffin defeats Gravis, Neuro defeats Bolobo, and Kai defeats Ash, each obtaining a Jade Blade and moving on. The Ninja try to get help from Neuro, who fails to break into Chen's quarters but nevertheless learns that Chen is planning to steal everyone's powers for a spell. When Cole and Jay are pitted against each other, Cole forfeits and gives up the Jade Blade to Jay, Cole is eliminated.
38	4	"Ninja Roll"	Peter Hausner	The Hageman Brothers	March 16, 2015	N/A
After Jacob, the Master of Sound, loses to Skylor, he is brought to Chen's underground factory, where he attempts to escape. Clouse catches Jacob and makes an example of him, by dragging him off to "feed" the second-largest snake in Ninjago. Cole, now powerless, happily finds Zane locked up and promises to get them both out. In the meantime, Nya uses her new vehicle to locate Chen's island to find the ninja, but Dareth ends up coming along. The elemental masters are given roller skates in an event called Thunderblade, where Lloyd and Camille, Master of Form, must complete as many laps as possible while carrying a Jade Blade, with the remaining elemental masters racing along to help them or slow them down. The ninja spread the news about Chen's plans among the other elemental masters, who choose to help Lloyd and overwhelm Camille. Camille crosses the finish line before Lloyd, but ends up dropping her Jade Blade, leading to Lloyd's victory. The ninja earn the trust of several other contestants.
39	5	"Spy for a Spy"	Trylle Vilstrup	The Hageman Brothers	March 23, 2015	N/A
The Ninja form an alliance with the Elemental Masters after convincing them of Chen's plan. Chen insists that the collected elemental powers will be bestowed on the winner of the tournament. He also reveals that he has a spy among the Elemental Masters, who begin to distrust each other, weakening the alliance. Nya enters Chen's palace, disguised as one of his attendants, and steals page 149 from Clouse's spell book, which is revealed to turn Chen's followers into Anacondrai.
40	6	"Spellbound"	Michael Helmuth Hansen	The Hageman Brothers	March 30, 2015	N/A
Chen discovers that Nya is on the island, and in the possession of the stolen spell. He tells the fighters that whoever finds her, wins the tournament altogether. Lloyd learns how to create a dragon without his Golden Power and, along with his father, stumbles upon the place where a great battle between the Elemental Masters and the Anacondrai took place. Garmadon reveals that it was Master Chen, who convinced both sides to declare war. In the war's aftermath, the Anacondrai Generals were banished to the Cursed Realm while the remaining Serpentine were locked in tombs. While the Elemental Masters are out in the jungle, Chen captures all of them, save for Lloyd, who did not take any of the "gifts" that would allow Chen to track him. Skylor is revealed to be Chen's spy and daughter.
41	7	"The Forgotten Element"	Jens Møller	The Hageman Brothers	March 31, 2015	N/A
Chen steals the powers of all Elemental Masters and only needs Lloyd's power to complete the spell. Meanwhile, Cole, Zane, and Karlof lead the imprisoned Elemental Masters in escaping the factory, using a makeshift Roto Jet. Chen has Kai betray Lloyd and trick him into battling Chen, who uses all the other Elemental Powers against Lloyd, defeating the Green Ninja and stealing his powers. However, Kai and Skylor take Chen's staff and destroy it, restoring the powers of all Elemental Masters.
42	8	"The Day of the Dragon"	Peter Hausner	The Hageman Brothers	April 1, 2015	N/A
Clouse believes that Skylor's power of Amber, which can absorb and copy elemental powers, can still be used for the spell. Kai manages to find Skylor and tries to help her escape, but they get captured. Clouse battles Garmadon and tries to banish him to the Cursed Realm, but Garmadon escapes and Clouse gets banished instead. Chen manages to complete Clouse's spell without him, turning himself, his followers, and everyone who has the Anacondrai symbol on their back (including Skylor and Garmadon) into Anacondrai. While he and his army fly back to Ninjago, Kai and Skylor escape. The Elemental Masters learn from Zane, who is now the Titanium Ninja, that they have the power to create their own dragon and follow Chen and his army. Jacob is revealed to be alive, having been tasked with feeding the serpent, rather than being fed to it.
43	9	"The Greatest Fear of All"	Per Düring Risager	The Hageman Brothers	April 2, 2015	N/A
The spell that turned Chen and his followers into Anacondrai begins to wear off, and Chen requires the essence of a true Anacondrai to make it permanent. His forces break into Kryptarium prison, where the Ninja are visiting the shrunken Pythor. Chen extracts Pythor's essence, completing the transformation, and seemingly loads his army on noodle trucks to dispatch them to various locations. The Elemental Masters intercept them, realizing too late that they have fallen for a diversion as the bulk of Chen's anacondrai warriors are attacking Ninjago City.
44	10	"The Corridor of Elders"	Trylle Vilstrup	The Hageman Brothers	April 3, 2015	N/A
The combined forces of the Elemental Masters and the Serpentine make their final stand at the Corridor of Elders against Chen's Anacondrai army. Pythor escapes and convinces Garmadon to release the Anacondrai generals, hoping they would help defeat Chen since he made a mockery of their tribe. The spell however requires the one who banished them to be sacrificed to the Cursed Realm in exchange. Garmadon sacrifices himself, feeling he must make amends for wronging his own family back when he was under Chen's tutelage, and releases the Anacondrai spirits. Chen and his army are spirited away into the cursed realm, and Garmadon is banished along with them. The Ninja burn the Spellbook and build a memorial to Garmadon in the Corridor of Elders. A ghost is shown having escaped the Cursed Realm, foreshadowing the following season.

== Reception ==
=== Ratings ===
Tournament of Elements continued the popularity of the preceding seasons of Ninjago: Masters of Spinjitzu. Its Monday 6.30pm time slot was the top telecast of the day among boys aged 2–11 and 6–11, and it was the top telecast in its time period among children aged 2–11, 6–11 and all boys.

=== Critical reception ===
Reviewer Melissa Camacho for Common Sense Media gave Tournament of Elements a 3 out of 5 star rating and noted that the season contains "lots of action-packed fantasy violence". The reviewer opined, "This colorful, fast-paced action series features the teen Ninja making sense of loss as they continue to learn lessons about loyalty and teamwork. It also highlights the importance of fighting with a sense of morality behind it, which is an interesting angle for an animated show based on toys."

== Other media ==
=== Video game ===
An associated action game titled Lego Ninjago: Tournament was released on January 23, 2015 for IOS, which was developed by The Lego Group.

=== Mini-movies ===
Five mini-movies were released in July and August 2015 on the Lego YouTube channel to accompany the season, which focus on the main antagonist, Master Chen. The mini-movies were produced by Wil Film ApS and were titled Chairful What You Wish For, Chen's New Chair, Chair Play Chen, Chair Up Chen and Bad Chair Day.

== See also ==
- Lloyd Garmadon
