= List of ReBoot episodes =

This is the complete episode listing for the Canadian CGI television series ReBoot, which was broadcast on YTV, as well as in the United States on ABC and Cartoon Network's Toonami block between 1994 and 2001.

A total of 47 episodes have been produced, including two television films which were syndicated as the eight-episode fourth season in 2001. An un-aired "making of" special, set within the first two seasons, has also been produced.

== Series overview ==
Season	Episodes	Originally aired	
Season	Episodes	Season premiere	Season finale
1	13	10 September 1994	21 January 1995
2	10	31 August 1995	1 February 1996
3	16	17 July 1997	24 January 1998
4	8	19 October 2001	25 November 2001

== Season 1 (1994–95) ==
No.	Title	Written by	Story by	Original release date
1 (v1.1)	"The Tearing"	Mark Hoffmeier	Lane Raichert and Mark Hoffmeier	10 September 1994 (Canada, US)
Bob and Dot fight to keep Megabyte from harnessing the power of a recently discovered, unusually large Tear. They barely succeed until a descending space fighter game harnesses it for him. Now Dot and Bob must defeat Megabyte inside the game or he will escape to infect the Super Computer and become more powerful than ever.
2 (v1.2)	"Racing the Clock"	Mark Edens and Lane Raichert	Mark Edens and Ian Pearson	17 September 1994 (Canada, US)
Megabyte tricks Enzo into delivering a dangerous delete command to Hexadecimal. By the time Enzo realises his mistake, the unknowing Bob is trapped inside a Formula 1 game with the command about to go off any millisecond. Enzo and Dot must race against the clock to save Bob from certain deletion.
3 (v1.3)	"Quick and the Fed"	Mark Edens and Lane Raichert	Mark Edens and Ian Pearson	24 September 1994 (Canada, US)
Thwarting a plan by Megabyte to create a portal, Bob retrieves a dangerous magnet which puts Dot's life in danger.
4 (v1.4)	"Medusa Bug"	Lane Raichert	Lane Raichert, Ian Pearson, Phil Mitchell and Gavin Blair	8 October 1994 (Canada, US)
Megabyte steals a secret object from Hexadecimal, which proves to be a dangerous bug: the Medusa, which spreads throughout Mainframe, turning anything it touches into stone.
5 (v1.5)	"The Tiff"	Lane Raichert	Lane Raichert	19 November 1994 (US)
When Bob and Dot become insufferable after an argument, Enzo tries one scheme after another to rekindle their friendship. Just when Enzo gives up on the stubborn pair, the dangerous Starship Alcatraz game forces the two to work together and see each other's point of view.
6 (v1.6)	"In the Belly of the Beast"	Mark Hoffmeier	Mark Hoffmeier and Lane Raichert	3 December 1994 (Canada, US)
When Frisket swallows a valuable command, Megabyte captures him in order to remove it. Once inside Silicon Tor, however, the powerful Frisket and the mischievous Enzo prove to be more than Megabyte bargained for.
7 (v1.7)	"The Crimson Binome"	Lane Raichert	Gavin Blair, Phil Mitchell, Ian Pearson and Lane Raichert	10 December 1994 (Canada)
Swashbuckling software pirates pillage and plunder Mainframe, taking Bob as their prize catch. The ingenious Dot organises the outraged citizens and leads a high seas posse to rescue their friend.
8 (v1.8)	"Enzo the Smart"	Mark Hoffmeier and Lane Raichert	Mark Edens, Brendan McCarthy and Ian Pearson	17 December 1994 (Canada)
In an attempt to make himself smarter, Enzo inadvertently turns everyone in Mainframe into simple minded 8-bit dolts. Now he must turn them back to normal before their naive ways get them nullified in a Track and Field game.
9 (v1.9)	"Wizards, Warriors and a Word from Our Sponsor"	Jono Howard and Lane Raichert	Gavin Blair, Phil Mitchell, Ian Pearson and Lane Raichert	24 December 1994 (US)
Bob, Dot and Enzo are stuck in a role-playing game with the intrusive Mike the TV, where all in one and one in all has the key.
10 (v1.10)	"The Great Brain Robbery"	Jono Howard	Jono Howard and Lane Raichert	31 December 1994 (Canada)
In an attempt to access the Supercomputer, Megabyte hires a hacker named Mouse to enter Bob's brain. The plan goes awry when they wind up in Enzo's brain instead.
11 (v1.11)	"Talent Night"	Lane Raichert	Gavin Blair, Phil Mitchell and Ian Pearson	7 January 1995 (Canada)
Dot prepares a surprise talent show for Enzo's birthday; Megabyte, upset about not being invited, prepares his own act.
12 (v1.12.1)	"Identity Crisis, Part 1"	Jono Howard	Gavin Blair, Phil Mitchell and Ian Pearson	14 January 1995 (Canada)
Dot has to convince a sector under Megabyte's control to give her their PID codes in order to convert their sector back to its normal state.
13 (v1.12.2)	"Identity Crisis, Part 2"	Jono Howard	Gavin Blair, Phil Mitchell and Ian Pearson	21 January 1995 (US)
After being betrayed by Cyrus, Dot's emotions of guilt get the better of her during a difficult game.

== Season 2 (1995–96) ==
No.	Title	Written by	Story by	Original release date
14 (v2.1)	"Infected"	Martin Borycki	Gavin Blair, Phil Mitchell, Ian Pearson and Lane Raichert	31 August 1995 (Canada)
Disguised as an upgrade, Megabyte enters Mainframe's core control chamber. He badly hurts Phong and initiates an Erase Command that almost destroys the System, only to be thwarted by Bob exploiting his greed. Megabyte hints at a surprising connection to Hexadecimal.
15 (v2.2)	"High Code"	Martin Borycki	Gavin Blair, Phil Mitchell, Ian Pearson and Lane Raichert	7 September 1995 (US)
A Codemaster, Lens the Reaper, wreaks havoc in Mainframe while looking to challenge the legendary Codemaster Talon who took refuge in the system. Phong and Bob assure him that there is no one in Mainframe called Talon. Enzo discovers that Old Man Pearson is Talon, and has to convince him to come out of hiding—while Bob tricks Lens into a Game with the hope of nullifying them both to save the System. In the end, Lens is moved by the Mainframers' honorable willingness to die for each other.
16 (v2.3)	"When Games Collide"	Jono Howard	Gavin Blair, Brendan McCarthy, Phil Mitchell, Ian Pearson and Lane Raichert	14 September 1995 (Canada)
Megabyte uses game energy to break into Mainframe's archives. He causes two games to merge into one and becomes trapped in the game himself. Bob saves his life, forcing Megabyte to grudgingly let him go when he captures him in the archives.
17 (v2.4)	"Bad Bob"	Martin Borycki and Susan Turner	Martin Borycki and Susan Turner	21 September 1995 (Canada)
Megabyte attacks the Principal Office to steal Mainframe's Core energy. This causes a Game to be corrupted. Bob and Enzo have to get the Core energy—being transported by "Megatruck", a transformed Megabyte—back to the Office before it can leave with the Game.
18 (v2.5)	"Painted Windows"	Jono Howard and Susan Turner	Gavin Blair, Phil Mitchell, Ian Pearson, Mark Schiemann & Susan Turner	2 November 1995 (Canada)
Hexadecimal accesses the system's Paint program, and Mainframe is her canvas. She soon begins to wreak havoc, causing a communications blackout, and melting all forms of transport, and glitch.
19 (v2.6)	"AndrAIa"	Steve Ball, Phil Mitchell, Ian Pearson and Susan Turner	Steve Ball, Phil Mitchell, Ian Pearson & Susan Turner	9 November 1995 (Canada)
Enzo is depressed because he feels lonely. During an underwater game, he befriends a game sprite named AndrAIa. When the game is won, he discovers she attached a back-up copy of herself to his icon so they can remain together.
20 (v2.7.1)	"Nullzilla"	Susan Turner	Susan Turner	16 December 1995 (US)
When an unusual creature arrives from Hexadecimal's Mirror and infects her, thousands of nulls, including Megabyte's pet Nibbles, envelop Hexadecimal in order to protect Mainframe. In order to defeat "Nullzilla", Phong sends Bob, Dot, Enzo, Mike the T.V., Frisket, and AndrAIa in a giant mecha robot to battle the monster. While Hexadecimal goes back to normal after being defeated, the intruding creature found a new target: Megabyte.
21 (v2.7.2)	"Gigabyte"	Phil Mitchell and Susan Turner	Phil Mitchell and Susan Turner	23 December 1995 (US)
The possessed Megabyte merges with Hexadecimal, creating the terrifying energy-absorbing virus, Gigabyte. The Mainframers fight to stop him gaining full strength, alongside both Hack & Slash and a returning Mouse in the battle against the new virus.
22 (v2.7.3)	"Trust No One"	Mark Leiren-Young	Gavin Blair, Mark Leiren-Young, Phil Mitchell, Ian Pearson and Susan Turner	30 December 1995 (US)
Mainframe citizens are mysteriously disappearing, including Dot and Al's waiter. Phong hires two CGI Special Agents, Fax Modem and Data Nully to investigate the disappearances, along with Bob and Mouse. They discover the now enlarged invader identified as a creature from the Web. The implications of the situation get a lot worse when the guardians become aware.
23 (v2.7.4)	"Web World Wars"	Mark Leiren-Young	Mark Leiren-Young, Brendan McCarthy, Phil Mitchell, Ian Pearson and Susan Turner	1 February 1996 (Canada)
A portal to the Web hovers over Mainframe, and its citizens must prepare for war. Due to the situation Bob gives Enzo a commission as a cadet guardian. Megabyte and Hexadecimal join the battle, but they have a secret ulterior motive.

== Season 3 (1997–98) ==
No.	Title	Written by	Story by	Original release date
24 (v3.1.1)	"To Mend and Defend"	Marv Wolfman	Gavin Blair, Ian Pearson, Phil Mitchell and Michael Skorey	20 August 1997 (Canada)
Dot is now the Commander of the Principal Office and with Bob gone, Enzo must prove himself as a Guardian while Megabyte and Hexadecimal attack the Principal Office.
25 (v3.1.2)	"Between a Raccoon and a Hard Place"	Len Wein	Gavin Blair, Phil Mitchell and Ian Pearson	27 August 1997 (Canada)
Confidence in Enzo's skills begin to diminish due to efforts by Megabyte, who is easily seizing sectors. To prove himself as a capable Guardian, he and AndrAIa enter a game in order to win it without Dot's help.
26 (v3.1.3)	"Firewall"	Dan DiDio	Gavin Blair, Phil Mitchell and Ian Pearson	3 September 1997 (Canada)
Enzo begins to lose confidence in himself after a deadly encounter with Megabyte, though he, along with the others, attempt to develop a firewall to stop Megabyte's efforts to infect Mainframe.
27 (v3.1.4)	"Game Over"	Ian Pearson	Gavin Blair, Phil Mitchell and Ian Pearson	10 September 1997 (Canada)
With the threat of Megabyte and Hexadecimal diminished, the Mainframers can concentrate on finding Bob. The User brings down a deadly combat game and the odds are against Enzo.
28 (v3.2.1)	"Icons"	Christy Marx	Gavin Blair, Phil Mitchell and Ian Pearson	17 September 1997 (Canada)
After losing a game, Enzo (Matrix) and AndrAIa begin game hopping between systems to return to Mainframe. The now grown up Matrix is a Renegade, and AndrAIa a fully experienced warrior. They find themselves transferred to a system that is slowly crashing, and they train a group of sprites how to defend themselves when another game cube arrives with a supernatural medieval theme with a young sprite that is overly naive and very dependent on Matrix.
29 (v3.2.2)	"Where No Sprite Has Gone Before"	D.C. Fontana	Gavin Blair, Phil Mitchell, Dan DiDio and Ian Pearson	24 September 1997 (Canada)
Matrix, AndrAIa and Frisket arrive in a system ruled by the Hero Selective gang of spectrals reformatted as Sprites for the games with the appearance of being superhero-like, led by the Marvel Comic's Ironman-esque Rob Cursor somewhat resembling Bob but has no inclination to the duties of the Guardians.
30 (v3.2.3)	"Number 7"	Dan DiDio	Gavin Blair, Phil Mitchell, Dan DiDio and Ian Pearson	1 October 1997 (Canada)
Entering a game, Matrix and AndrAIa find themselves back in Mainframe where Bob and Dot mistake Matrix and Andrea who are Rebooted into Megabyte and Hexadecimal, trying to find the mysterious number 1.
31 (v3.2.4)	"The Episode with No Name"	Adria Budd	Gavin Blair, Phil Mitchell and Ian Pearson	8 October 1997 (Canada)
Matrix and AndrAIa arrive in a system with a port to the net making Mainframe that much closer. The Guardians however... are infected by a supervirus named Daemon, but Turbo, the Leader of the Guardians though infected is fighting it. He explains the only hope of defeating Daemon lies in Bob's protocol. Matrix must find Bob not only to return him home, but to save the net.
32 (v3.3.1)	"Return of the Crimson Binome"	Christy Marx	Gavin Blair, Christy Marx, Dan DiDio, Phil Mitchell and Ian Pearson	15 October 1997 (Canada)
When Matrix and AndrAIa find that Captain Capacitor's crew are being held in the portal system due to a new law enforced by the guardians. They attempt a prison break-in to free them to use their ship to return to Mainframe, and find a Web Surfer named Ray Tracer who agrees to help them. Matrix grows jealous of him when he flirts with AndrAIa. Notes: This was the last episode shown in Britain due to concerns that the show's themes were becoming more mature.
33 (v3.3.2)	"The Edge of Beyond"	Christy Marx	Gavin Blair, Christy Marx, Dan DiDio, Phil Mitchell and Ian Pearson	22 October 1997 (Canada)
With Ray Tracer and Captain Capacitor and his crew, Matrix and AndrAIa enter the Web to find Bob and to return to Mainframe. They find themselves with a new goal after AndrAIa gets bitten by a Web Creature.
34 (v3.3.3)	"Web Riders on the Storm"	Len Wein	Gavin Blair, Ian Pearson, Dan DiDio, Len Wein, Phil Mitchell and Marv Wolfman	29 October 1997 (Canada)
The crew of the Saucy Mare encounter Web Riders, beings living in the web, who are not happy with their arrival in the Web. The crew must fight them off and time is running out for AndrAia.
35 (v3.3.4)	"Mousetrap"	Marv Wolfman	Gavin Blair, Ian Pearson, Dan DiDio, Len Wein, Phil Mitchell and Marv Wolfman	5 November 1997 (Canada)
With Bob and a portal found, the Saucy Mare prepares to return to Mainframe, but Mouse has set traps that make the trip more difficult than expected.
36 (v3.4.1)	"Megaframe"	Katherine Lawrence	Gavin Blair, Katherine Lawrence, Dan DiDio, Phil Mitchell and Ian Pearson	3 January 1998 (Canada)
The Saucy Mare arrives to a heavily damaged Mainframe, under the control of Megabyte. They are in preparation for an assault on the Principal Office and Bob gets abducted by Hexadecimal.
37 (v3.4.2)	"Showdown"	Len Wein	Gavin Blair, Ian Pearson, Dan DiDio, Len Wein, Phil Mitchell and Marv Wolfman	10 January 1998 (Canada)
Reunited with friends and family, Dot, AndrAIa, Mouse, Matrix and their group of binome rebels begin to invade the Principal Office, where Megabyte and his army await. Meanwhile Hexadecimal holds Bob against his will until he voluntarily does something benevolent for her. Matrix faces Megabyte alone before he escapes the system.
38 (v3.4.3)	"System Crash"	Marv Wolfman	Gavin Blair, Ian Pearson, Dan DiDio, Len Wein, Phil Mitchell and Marv Wolfman	17 January 1998 (Canada)
Megabyte is sent to The Web and Mainframe begins to crash. The Instability causes tears that allow saved User avatars from games of previous episodes to leak into the city and attack. While the protagonists fend them off, Bob tries to save the system by entering the core.
39 (v3.4.4)	"End Prog"	Ken Pontac	Gavin Blair, Ian Pearson, Dan DiDio, Len Wein, Phil Mitchell and Marv Wolfman	24 January 1998 (Canada)
A game cube threatens to push the crashing Mainframe over the edge. The User restores the system, and everything returns to a functional state, effectively returning it to what it was before the war, with a few exceptions. A five minute musical summary of the episodes Web World Wars to End Prog plays beginning after the credits start to roll.

== Season 4 (2001) ==
In its DVD release and original Canadian broadcast, the fourth season was initially presented as two films, and was then syndicated as separate episodes.

=== Daemon Rising ===
No.	Title	Directed by	Written by	Original release date
40 (v4.1.1)	"Daemon Rising"	George Roman Samilski	Ian Pearson, Gavin Blair and Ian Weir	19 October 2001 (US)
The forces of Daemon have infected most of the net, and begin to invade Mainframe. Hexadecimal seals the system but at a certain cost.
41 (v4.1.2)	"Cross Nodes"	George Roman Samilski	Ian Pearson, Gavin Blair and Ian Weir	19 October 2001 (US)
Daemon continues to plan in order to retrieve Bob, who could help her infect the entire net. Flashbacks reveal a young precocious Dot outsmarting her father Welman, a scientist professor. Matrix comes across a fully infected Turbo, and Hexadecimal experiences a certain change.
42 (v4.1.3)	"What's Love Got to Do with It?"	George Roman Samilski	Ian Pearson, Gavin Blair and Ian Weir	26 October 2001 (US)
Matrix and Mouse plan to stop Daemon after AndrAIa is infected by her. Meanwhile, Dot tries to get Hexadecimal to bring back her father. Bob attempts to cure Turbo but his code doesn't work.
43 (v4.1.4)	"Sacrifice"	George Roman Samilski	Ian Pearson, Gavin Blair, Phil Mitchell and Ian Weir	2 November 2001 (US)
With Matrix, AndrAIa and Mouse converted, Daemon travels to Mainframe herself to complete her plans. Enzo finds himself the only one who can turn the tide, until Hexadecimal gets power from Mainframes core.

=== My Two Bobs ===
No.	Title	Directed by	Written by	Original release date
44 (v4.2.1)	"My Two Bobs"	Steve Ball	Ian Pearson, Gavin Blair, Raul Inglis and Phil Mitchell	9 November 2001 (US)
With the Daemon threat gone, a second Bob appears in Mainframe, leaving Dot with a difficult decision as to which one to marry. Meanwhile Matrix and "New Bob" deal with a game as "Glitch Bob" questions if he is in fact a copy.
45 (v4.2.2)	"Life's a Glitch"	Steve Ball	Ian Pearson and Gavin Blair	16 November 2001 (US)
'Glitch-Bob' thinks about separating Glitch from himself to return to his normal self. Matrix, AndrAIa, Enzo, Phong, and "New Bob" deal with a game that has a familiar User.
46 (v4.2.3)	"Null-Bot of the Bride"	Steve Ball	Ian Pearson, Gavin Blair, Raul Inglis and Phil Mitchell	23 November 2001 (US)
With "Glitch-Bob" incapacitated in the Supercomputer, Dot decides to marry the new Bob, but as "Glitch-Bob" regains his health and original form, the new arrival is revealed to be a disguised Megabyte.
47 (v4.2.4)	"Crouching Binome, Hidden Virus"	Steve Ball	Ian Pearson, Gavin Blair, Raul Inglis and Phil Mitchell	30 November 2001 (US)
With Megabyte now a shape-shifting Trojan horse virus, Bob, Dot and the others attempt to track him down and capture him. However, Megabyte tricks them and seizes control of the Principal Office, and swears revenge in the form of a Predatory Hunt. The series concluded with a cliffhanger ending. In 2008, Rainmaker attempted a continuation via the web-comic "Paradigms Lost" written by Jeffrey Campbell, but it remains uncanonical to the series proper.

== Special ==
#	Title	Original air date
1 (v0.1)	"Fast Forward: The Making of ReBoot"	Unaired
An un-aired special meant to be shown between seasons 1 and 2, giving viewers an inside look as to how ReBoot is created, along with its humble beginnings. Tony Jay reprises his role as Megabyte to introduce the special, as well as lead another one of his attempted take-over plans.
