= Michael Benyaer =

Canadian actor (born 1970)

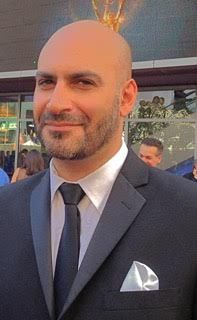
- Benyaer at the 65th Primetime Emmy Awards in 2013
- Born: May 25, 1970 (age 56); Vancouver, British Columbia, Canada
- Occupation: Actor
- Years active: 1986–present
- Website: http://www.michaelbenyaer.com

Michael Benyaer (born May 25, 1970) is a Canadian actor. He is best known for his roles as Bob in the Canadian CGI series ReBoot and Hadji Singh in season one of The Real Adventures of Jonny Quest.

== Career ==
On playing Hadji, Benyaer stated, "[he] is one of the few roles for an ethnic actor that is not a bad guy. I mean, how many East Indian heroes have been on television? Hadji is for the sensitive kids out there. He is the outsider in all of us." A Star Wars fan, Benyaer relished the opportunity to work with Mark Hamill for the episode In the Realm of the Condor.

Benyaer has appeared in feature films, including Transformers: Revenge of the Fallen, G.I. Joe: The Rise of Cobra, The Hitman, Postal and Deadpool. On television, he has appeared in shows such as 24, NCIS, Castle, The Shield, Sanctuary, The Last Ship, The Flash, Modern Family, Emily's Reasons Why Not and Days of Our Lives.

His notable animation roles include Ken in Barbie and the Rockers: Out of This World, G.I. Joe as Airwave and Scoop, Exosquad as Kaz Takagi and Praetorious, Hurricanes as Stats Hiro and Plato Quinones, Hot Wheels: World Race as William "Banjee" Castillo and Kanan Jarrus in Lego Star Wars: Droid Tales. He guest-starred as various characters on Robot Chicken.

His voice is heard in the video games Assassin's Creed: Revelations as Darim Ibn La-Ahad, Lt. Draza in Uncharted 2: Among Thieves, Lt. Nanib Sahir in Age of Empires III: The Asian Dynasties, Vampire: The Masquerade – Redemption as Wilhelm, Marvel Heroes as Dum Dum Dugan, King's Quest as Mr. Waddles and Dying Light as Tahir. He also provides various voices in The Matrix: Path of Neo, Star Wars: The Old Republic, 007: Quantum of Solace, SOCOM 4 U.S. Navy SEALs, Need for Speed: Underground, The Elder Scrolls, Skylanders: Trap Team and Call of Duty: Advanced Warfare.

Benyaer has also worked as a scriptwriter for several episodes of Billy the Cat, the cult TV series Pilot One, and the Canadian version of Sesame Street.

== Filmography ==
=== Film ===
Year	Title	Role	Notes
1989	Friday the 13th Part VIII: Jason Takes Manhattan	Joe "Jo-Jo"	
1991	The Hitman	Hassan	
1996	Underworld	Vince	
1997	Masterminds	Taxi Driver	
1998	Surface to Air	Iraqi Soldier	
2000	How to Kill Your Neighbor's Dog	Father Neighbor	
2002	Dead Heat	Warehouse Worker	
2003	Hot Wheels: World Race	William "Banjee" Castillo	Voice, direct-to-video
2007	Postal	Mohammed	
2008	Far Cry	Smith, Mercenary	
2009	Transformers: Revenge of the Fallen	Egyptian Interpol Officer #2	
2009	G.I. Joe: The Rise of Cobra	Flight Technician	
2013	Assault on Wall Street	Dr. John Nordella	
2016	Deadpool	Warlord	
2017	The Layover	Shahar	
2018	Beyond the Sky	Dr. Maurice	
2025	Light of the World	Nicodemus	Voice

=== Television ===
Year	Title	Role	Notes
1987	21 Jump Street	Don	Episode: "Next Generation"
1987	Wiseguy	Dino	Episode: "Prodigal Son"
1987	Barbie and the Rockers: Out of This World	Ken	Voice, television short
1988	Higher Ground	Ike Tench	Television film
1988–89	MacGyver	J.D. / Sniper	2 episodes
1993–94	Exosquad	Kaz Takagi / Praetorius	Voice, 10 episodes
1993–97	Hurricanes	Stats Hiro	Voice, 7 episodes
1994–2001	ReBoot	Bob	Voice, 29 episodes
1996–97	The Real Adventures of Jonny Quest	Hadji Singh	Voice, 24 episodes
1998	Viper	Emile	Episode: "Wisegal"
1999, 2004	Da Vinci's Inquest	Brad Stuart / Constable Neil Cohen	2 episodes
2000	Secret Agent Man	Bureau Chief	Episode: "Supernaked"
2001	Mobile Suit Gundam	M'Quve	Voice, English dub
2001	Dark Angel	Onion Runyon	Episode: "Art Attack"
2001	ReBoot: Daemon Rising	Bob	Voice, television film
2001	ReBoot: My Two Bobs	Bob	Voice, television film
2001–03	Sitting Ducks	Raoul	Voice, 26 episodes
2001–07	Robot Chicken	Various Voices	7 episodes
2003	Smallville	Jameson	Episode: "Shattered"
2004	The L Word	Marc	Episode: "Let's Do It"
2004	The Shield	Goma Magar	Episode: "On Tilt"
2004	Romeo!	Jarrad	Episode: "Friends & Lovers"
2005	24	Naseem	1 episode
2005	Murder Unveiled	Ashu	Television film
2005	The Inside	David Sarkesian	Episode: "Point of Origin"
2006	The Path to 9/11	Khalid Sheikh Mohammed	Miniseries
2006	Eureka	Dr. Louis Glazer	Episode: "Purple Haze"
2006–08	Emily's Reasons Why Not	Aknad	Miniseries
2007	Bionic Woman	Raul	Episode: "Faceoff"
2009	Eli Stone	Dr. Lawson	Episode: "Flight Path"
2009	Castle	Oscar	Episode: "Always Buy Retail"
2009	Sanctuary	Assam	Episode: "End of Nights: Part 1"
2009	The Mentalist	Dr. Joseph Gorshani	Episode: "A Price Above Rubies"
2010	Saving Grace	Hospital Official	Episode: "Let's Talk"
2010	Svetlana	Ahmedinajad's Interpreter	Episode: "Yellowcake"
2011	Chaos	Sadegh	Episode: "Mincemeat"
2011	NCIS	Osman Zoranj	Episode: "Engaged (Part II)"
2012	Fairly Legal	Grantham Pace HR Lawyer	Episode: "Shine a Light"
2013	Motive	Stuart Nieuwendyk	Episode: "Detour"
2013	Perception	Dr. Arthur Singh	Episode: "Defective"
2013–14	Days of Our Lives	Dr. Chyka	39 episodes
2014	Intelligence	Badri Adani	Episode: "Pilot"
2014	Modern Family	Jerry	Episode: "The Wedding, Part 1"
2014	The Last Ship	Amir	Episode: "Welcome to Gitmo"
2014	The Flash	Araz	Episode: "Things You Can't Outrun"
2015	Olympus	General Kastor	Episode: "Blood Brothers"
2015	Lego Star Wars: Droid Tales	Kanan Jarrus	Voice, television special
2016	Criminal Minds: Beyond Borders	Salah Sabila	Episode: "Citizens of the World"
2016	Beauty and the Beast	Karim	Episode: "Au Revoir"
2016	Legends of the Hidden Temple	King Olmec	Television film
2017	Man Seeking Woman	Khalid	Episode: "Pad Thai"
2017	Prison Break	Zakat	3 episodes
2017	Madam Secretary	President Bassam Sayedd	Episode: "Revelation"
2017	S.W.A.T.	Tarek	Episode: "Radical"
2018	The Brave	Omid	Episode: "Desperate Measures"
2018	Taken	Liad Meidar	Episode: "Invitation Only"
2018	ReBoot: The Guardian Code	Bob	Voice, episode: "Mainframe Mayhem"
2018	Snowfall	Dareh	Episode: "Jingle Bell Rock"
2018	Magnum P.I.	Samal Talib	Episode: "From the Head Down"
2019	Love, Death & Robots	Dr. Wehunt	Voice, episode: "Sucker of Souls"
2019	The Expanse	Arjun	6 episodes, replaced Brian George
2023	Star Trek: Strange New Worlds	Sevet	Episode: "Charades"
2024	Tracker	Vince Talbott	Episode: "The Storm"
2024	Curses!	Manticore	Voice, episode: "The Persian Block Die"
2025	Leviathan	Zaven	Voice
2025	Bat-Fam	Ra's Al Ghul, Mr. Singh, Custodian, Cashier	Voice

=== Video games ===
Year	Title	Role	Notes	Source
1996	Jonny Quest: Cover-Up at Roswell	Hadji Singh		
1998	ReBoot	Bob		
2000	Kessen	Yukinaga Konishi / Morichika Chosokabe / Keiji Maeda / Retainer East	English dub	
2000	Vampire: The Masquerade – Redemption	Wilhelm		
2001	Mobile Suit Gundam: Zeonic Front	M'Quve	Uncredited; English dub	
2002	Mobile Suit Gundam: Federation vs. Zeon	M'Quve	Uncredited; English dub	
2005	The Matrix: Path of Neo	Vamp / Police / Security		
2006	SOCOM U.S. Navy SEALs: Fireteam Bravo 2	Additional Voice Over Talent		
2008	007: Quantum of Solace	Mercenaries		
2009	Uncharted 2: Among Thieves	Lieutenant Draza / Serbian Soldiers		
2010	Medal of Honor	Fighter	Uncredited	
2010	Blur	Khan	Unused cutscene	
2011	SOCOM 4 U.S. Navy SEALs	ClawHammer Soldier #1 / Pilot #3 / NATO #1		
2011	Uncharted 3: Drake's Deception	Indian Ocean Pirates		
2011	Assassin's Creed: Revelations	Darim Ibn La-Ahad / Haras / Abbas's Captain / Masyaf Assassins		
2011	Star Wars: The Old Republic	Additional Voices		
2012	Spec Ops: The Line	Soldiers		
2012	XCOM: Enemy Unknown	Comm. Clerk		
2012	Call of Duty: Black Ops II	Multiplayer		
2013	Marvel Heroes	Dum Dum Dugan / Blizzard / Dark Elves	Uncredited	
2013	Lightning Returns: Final Fantasy XIII	Additional Voices	English dub	
2014	The Elder Scrolls Online	Hrogi / Nord Guard Male / Justice Istah		
2014	Call of Duty: Advanced Warfare	Additional Voices		
2015	Dying Light	Tahir / Additional Voices		
2015	King's Quest	Mr. Waddles		
2018	Assassin's Creed Odyssey	Darius	Also Legacy of the First Blade	
2022	Call of Duty: Vanguard	Khaled Al-Asad		
