= ReBoot: My Two Bobs =

2001 Canadian television film

- Written by: Raul Inglis; Ian Person; John Grace; Philip Mitchell; Gavin Blair
- Directed by: Steve Ball
- Theme music composer: Robert Buckley
- Country of origin: Canada
- Original language: English

Production
- Running time: 85 minutes
- Production companies: Alliance Atlantis Communications; Mainframe Entertainment; IDT Entertainment Sales

Original release
- Release: November 25, 2001

ReBoot: My Two Bobs is a 2001 Canadian television film based on the series ReBoot, that continues the events set in motion by the cliffhanger ending in Daemon Rising. Along with Daemon Rising, the two films are considered the fourth season. It was originally broadcast in Canada as a film, but was later rebroadcast as four individual episodes, titled "My Two Bobs", "Life's a Glitch", "Null-Bot of the Bride", and "Crouching Binome, Hidden Virus". It was released on DVD along with Daemon Rising.

== Plot ==
At the end of Daemon Rising, Bob and Dot got engaged. To the confusion of everyone, however, a portal then opened from the web, and Ray Tracer and another Bob step through it. Inasmuch as the second Bob looks like the original from Seasons 1 and 2, Dot calls him Bob and calls the Bob which merged with his keytool Glitch Bob. Most of My Two Bobs is taken up by the efforts of Dot, the two Bobs themselves, and the other Mainframers to ascertain which Bob is the original and which is the copy, and to come to terms with the situation in general.

Because Bob can reboot and Glitch Bob can't, Bob spends much of the first half of the film bonding with Matrix and the others by helping them win games. After some counseling from Phong and Mouse, Dot decides to marry the new Bob, whereupon Glitch Bob — the nominal original — earnestly attempts to return himself to his original form in order to win Dot back. His efforts ultimately fail and leave him in a catatonic state, covered in a dark, starry crystal that proves to be impenetrable. Dot continues with her wedding plans as Glitch Bob is treated at the Supercomputer. She laments that her father Welman is too nullified to attend, but when the infection in Enzo's icon is transferred to Welman, he becomes intelligible enough to walk her down the isle in a mechanical suit.

Glitch Bob's condition steadily worsens on Dot's wedding day. The impenetrable starry substance covering him gradually dims completely, and the Guardians believe that they have lost him. This moment of crisis prompts all of the other keytools (which had disconnected from the Guardians when they were infected by Daemon) to return to the Supercomputer to separate Glitch from Bob and revive him, before returning to the Guardians. The Guardians discover that this Bob's web-degraded code no longer matches what they have on file, suggesting that he is in fact the copy.

Web Bob returns to Mainframe to stop the wedding, but Dot rejects him in favor of the new Bob. Even Glitch seems to leave him for the new Bob, leading everyone to believe that Web Bob is the copy. Just as Web Bob starts to leave in despair, Glitch steals some code from the groom and gives it to Web Bob, which restores his body to its original form. The loss of that code causes the Bob Dot was marrying to shapeshift, revealing a terrible truth: Web Bob was the original, while the new Bob had been Megabyte in disguise. Bob engages Megabyte in a spectacular battle in the church, but Megabyte escapes by disguising himself as a Binome.

An investigation reveals that Megabyte has become a Trojan Horse virus, which gives him the power to shapeshift and effectively disguise himself as anyone. It is also revealed that Megabyte had inadvertently stolen part of Bob's Guardian code when he crushed Glitch at the end of Season 2, and he used that code to impersonate him until Glitch returned it to the real Bob during the wedding. Meanwhile, Megabyte starts disguising himself as other Mainframers, including Mike the TV, and reassembles his viral army. Megabyte eludes capture by using various aliases and a doppelgänger and ultimately infiltrates the war room by taking on the form of Frisket. After suborning various personnel, including Dot's father, and capturing Enzo, Megabyte gains "complete control" of the Principal Office. The film ends with him proclaiming that he will now follow his predatory virus nature; he is no longer out to take over Mainframe again or even the Supercomputer, he just wants revenge on the Mainframers. His last words, which are the final words of the series, are "Prepare yourselves... for the hunt!"

== Cast ==
- Sharon Alexander: AndrAIa
- Kathleen Barr: Dot Matrix
- Michael Benyaer: Bob
- Garry Chalk: Slash
- Ian James Corlett: Glitch-Bob
- Michael Donovan: Mike the TV, Phong
- Paul Dobson: Matrix (adult Enzo)
- Christopher Gray: Enzo Matrix
- Tony Jay: Megabyte
- Scott McNeil: Hack
- Shirley Millner: Hexadecimal
- Louise Vallance: Mouse
