= ReBoot =

Canadian animated TV series

- Genre: Science fiction Action-adventure; Cyberpunk
- Created by: Gavin Blair; Ian Pearson; Phil Mitchell; John Grace
- Developed by: Lane Raichert (season 1); Martin Borycki (season 2); Dan DiDio (season 3); Ian Pearson, Gavin Blair, and Phil Mitchell (season 4)
- Directed by: Dick Zondag; Steve Ball; George Samilski
- Voices of: Sharon Alexander; Kathleen Barr; Michael Benyaer; Garry Chalk; Ian James Corlett; Paul Dobson; Phil Hayes; Tony Jay; Scott McNeil; Shirley Milliner; Stevie Vallance
- Composer: Bob Buckley
- Country of origin: Canada
- Original language: English
- No. of seasons: 4
- No. of episodes: 48 (list of episodes)

Production
- Executive producers: Steven DeNure; Jay Firestone; Stephane Reichel; Steve Barron; Christopher Brough; Mark Ralston; Glen Griffiths; Ian Pearson; Asaph Fipke; Phil Mitchell; Kim Dent Wilder; For Alliance; Beth Stevenson; For YTV; Laurinda Shaver
- Producers: Christopher Brough; Ian Pearson
- Running time: 23 minutes
- Production companies: Mainframe Entertainment; BLT Productions, Ltd. (season 1-2); Alliance Communications (seasons 1–3); Alliance Atlantis (season 4)

Original release
- Network: YTV
- Release: September 10, 1994 – November 30, 2001

ReBoot is a Canadian animated television series created by Gavin Blair, Ian Pearson, Phil Mitchell, and John Grace, with the visuals designed by Brendan McCarthy after an initial attempt by Ian Gibson. It was produced by Vancouver-based Mainframe Entertainment, Alliance Entertainment and BLT Productions; and originally aired on YTV from 1994 until 2001. It is notable for being one of the first made-for-television CGI series.

== Overview ==
The show follows the adventures of a Guardian named Bob and his companions Enzo and Dot Matrix within the computer system world of Mainframe as they work to keep it safe from the viruses known as Megabyte and Hexadecimal, in addition to other threats. Recurring plot threads include the User loading a game into the system, manifesting as an electrical violet cube lowered onto part of the city. Anyone trapped inside become NPCs and have the chance to play against the User. If the User wins, the area is destroyed (a.k.a. nullified) and the residents are reduced to leech-like creatures called Nulls. The setting of the inner world of a computer system, known by its inhabitants as Mainframe, was deliberately chosen due to technological constraints at the time, as the fictional computer world allowed for blocky-looking models and mechanical animation.

== Cast and characters ==
- Bob (voiced by Michael Benyaer in seasons 1 and 2 and late season 4, Ian James Corlett in seasons 3 and 4) is Guardian 452 and the defender of Mainframe from both internal and external threats. Bob is often criticized by other Guardians for his unorthodox views regarding viruses: unlike other Guardians, who believe that viruses should simply be deleted on sight. Bob theorizes that viruses can be reprogrammed to live as Sprites, citing Hexadecimal as proof of his theories. Despite the difference in their personalities, he and Dot developed romantic tension that results them becoming a couple at the end of Season 3. Bob is equipped with a Guardian Keytool, "Glitch", which can transform into any device with a voice command.
- Dot (voiced by Kathleen Barr) is the daughter of leading Mainframe scientist Welman Matrix, to whom she was an assistant when she was a teenager. Now an adult and proprietor of Dot's Diner, Dot acts as Enzo's surrogate parent and guardian since the loss of their father, with their mother's fate being unknown. She takes over as COMMAND.COM in the third season.
- Enzo (voiced by Jesse Moss for the first ten episodes of Season 1, Matthew Sinclair for the final three episodes of Season 1 and the entirety of Season 2, Christopher Gray for the first four episodes of Season 3, Giacomo Baessato in Season 4, and Danny McKinnon in a flashback during Season 4) is Dot's little brother, who hero-worships Bob and intends to become a Guardian. To protect himself from deletion in the third season, Enzo leaves Mainframe and begins traveling between games, rapidly aging into a violent and cynical adult, taking on the mononym Matrix (voiced by Paul Dobson). Unlike many other characters, Enzo's name is not a reference to computer terminology.
- Frisket is a robotic dog who is Enzo's pet and acts in a threatening manner toward everyone other than Enzo and AndrAIa, with a particular dislike of Bob. Frisket has enhanced strength, comparable to that of Megabyte, being known to catch cannonballs and ABCs in his teeth.
- Megabyte (voiced by Tony Jay) – A "command and conquer, and infectious" computer virus. Megabyte is an "Order Virus". He came from the virus known as Kilobyte and when merged with his sister Hexadecimal, they form an even more powerful virus called Gigabyte. Megabyte commands his own army of binomes, and is quite strong, and capable of separating his top half from his lower half whenever he needs to.
- Hexadecimal (voiced by Shirley Milliner) – Megabyte's sister is a "chaotic" computer virus whose face is represented by a series of masks, each portraying a different emotion. She possesses incredible energy manipulating powers and telekinetic abilities. She is also shown to be able to fly on her own and controls the Nulls of Mainframe.
- Phong (voiced by Michael Donovan) – The original COMMAND.COM of Mainframe. Phong serves as a mentor and adviser to its inhabitants and works with Bob in defence of the system.
- Mouse (voiced by Louise Vallance) – A freelance hacker who is mentioned briefly before her first appearance. Mouse works for Megabyte in a one-shot early in the season, but switches sides to join Dot and Enzo. Together they defend Mainframe when Bob is trapped in "The Web".
- AndrAIa (voiced by Andrea Libman as a child, Sharon Alexander as an adult) is a copy of a Game Sprite who met Enzo in an undersea-themed game and fell in love with him at "first sight." AndrAIa piggy-backed her icon on Enzo's, allowing her to escape the game and stay in Mainframe with Enzo while her original self remained in the game. Her name is pronounced like "Andrea".
- Hack (voiced by Phil Hayes in season one, Scott McNeil in season two) and Slash (voiced by Garry Chalk) – Megabyte's henchmen. During the third season, they switch sides and join the COMMAND.COM side of Mainframe.
- Mike the TV (voiced by Michael Donovan) – A walking television that speaks in a commercial narration-like voice.
- Ray Tracer (voiced by Donal Gibson) – A web surfer that helps Matrix and Bob return to Mainframe, and becomes romantically linked to Mouse.
- Welman Matrix (voiced by Dale Wilson)– A scientist and father of Dot and Enzo Matrix. He designed a gateway device that would have allowed Mainframers to connect to outside Systems. Welman's experiment backfired due to his gateway pinging Gigabyte and warping him into Mainframe. The resulting explosion transformed Welman into a Null, split Gigabyte into Hexadecimal and Megabyte, and destroyed Mainframe's sister city. As a Null, Welman was taken in by Megabyte, who dubbed him Nibbles.

=== Voice cast ===
- Bob - Michael Benyaer (seasons 1, 2 and 4), Ian James Corlett (seasons 3 and 4)
- Dot Matrix, Princess Bula, System Voice – Kathleen Barr
- Enzo Matrix (young) – Jesse Moss (season 1), Matthew Sinclair (seasons 1 and 2), Christopher Gray (season 3), Danny McKinnon (season 4 (flashback))
- Welman Matrix – Dale Wilson
- Matrix (adult Enzo Matrix) – Paul Dobson
- Enzo Matrix (Little Enzo) – Christopher Gray (season 3), Giacomo Baessato (season 4)
- Megabyte – Tony Jay
- Hexadecimal – Shirley Milliner
- AndrAIa (young) – Andrea Libman
- AndrAIa (adult) – Sharon Alexander
- Phong, Mike the TV, Cecil, Al – Michael Donovan
- Mouse, Rocky the Raccoon – Stevie Vallance
- Ray Tracer – Donal Gibson
- Captain Capacitor, Old Man Pearson – Long John Baldry
- Slash, Turbo, Mr. Mitchell, Herr Doktor, Cyrus, Al's Waiter (front counter) – Garry Chalk
- Hack (seasons 1 and 2) – Phil Hayes
- Hack (seasons 2 to 4), Specky, Praying Mantis Virus – Scott McNeil
- Daemon – Colombe Demers
- Daecon – Richard Newman
- Killabyte, Gigabyte – Blu Mankuma
- Gigagirl, Copygirl – Venus Terzo
- Spectral Leader – David Kaye
- Hue Branch – Christopher Gaze
- Lens – Don Brown
- Maxine – Janyse Jaud
- Additional Voices – Brad Bent

== Production ==
=== Development ===
ReBoot was initially conceived in 1984 by the British creative collective The Hub, made up of John Grace, Ian Pearson, Gavin Blair and Phil Mitchell. After about eight years of development, Pearson, Blair and Mitchell moved to Vancouver, British Columbia, to produce the series. Pearson and Blair by this time had created some of the first widely seen CGI characters, in the Dire Straits music video for "Money for Nothing". However, technology was not yet advanced enough to make the show in the desired way. 3D animation tests began in earnest in 1990 and ReBoot had achieved its detailed look by 1991. Production continued on future episodes and the show aired in 1994 after enough episodes had been produced. This was a painstaking process, as no other company had at this time worked on a 3D animation project of this scale, and the software used was new to all in the company.

ReBoot was created on Silicon Graphics workstations using Softimage Creative Environment software.

=== Network censorship ===
The show's early jokes at the expense of Board of Standards and Practices (BS&P) came from frustration encountered by the show's makers brought about by an abundance of script and editing changes that were imposed upon Mainframe before episodes were allowed to air. These changes were all aimed at making the show "appropriate" for kids, and to prevent even the slightest appearance of "inappropriate" content, imitable violence or sexuality.

The character Dot was considered too sexualized by the BS&P even though she was "never one to expose much cleavage" so the animators were forced to make her breasts less curvy and form them into a lumpy "monobreast", as lightly referred to by the staff. However, starting with season three, after severing ties with ABC, the "monobreasts" of all adult female characters were replaced with more anatomically correct versions. In another case, the word "hockey", as well as the sport itself, was cut in some countries as it was supposedly used as a vulgar slang term there. In the episode "Talent Night", one scene of Dot giving her brother Enzo "a sisterly kiss on the chin" was cut due to BS&P's fear of promoting incest, an insinuation which Pearson described as "one of the sickest things I've heard."

== Episodes ==
=== Season 1 (1994–95) ===
Each installment of the first season was a self-contained episode except for the two-part finale. When the User loads a game, a game cube drops on a random location in Mainframe, sealing it off from the rest of the system and turning it into a gamescape. Bob frequently enters the games, reboots to become a game character, and fights the User's character to save the sector. If the User wins a game, the sector the cube fell in is destroyed, and the sprites and binomes who were caught within are turned into energy-draining, worm-like parasites called nulls. When this happens, they are said to be "nullified".

In the U.S., the show was aired on the ABC network and had to comply with Broadcast Standards and Practices. This was lampooned in "Talent Night", where almost every act for Enzo's party is banned by Prog Censor Emma See and the Small Town Binomes sing their hit BSnP ("It's fun to play/In a non-violent way").

=== Season 2 (1995–96) ===
The second season was initially as episodic as the first but later featured an extended story arc that began with the season's fifth episode, "Painted Windows". The arc revealed that Hexadecimal and Megabyte are siblings, and introduced an external threat to Mainframe: the Web, which was set up in fearful mentions in "High Code" and "Painted Windows". The sixth episode, "AndrAIa", also saw a new character in the titular AndrAIa join the cast. Creator Gavin Blair has said the move to a longer arc came from "shrugging off the shackles of ABC and their BS&P" after being cancelled. The last episode would reveal Megabyte's ships were called ABCs.

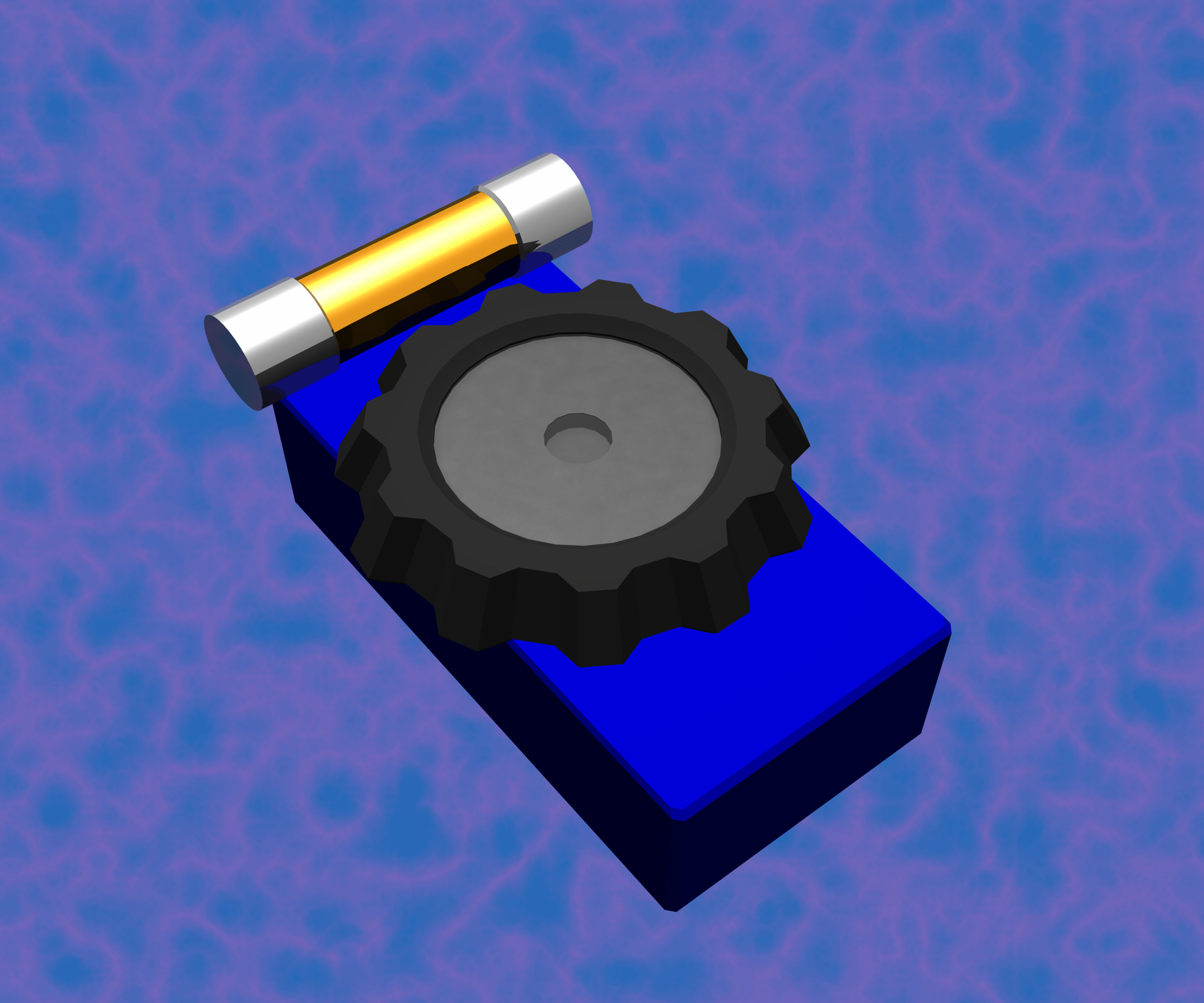
Glitch - Guardian Bob's keytool

A creature from the Web entered Mainframe from Hexadecimal's looking glass (which was shattered by Mike the TV), bonding with her. Mainframe's nulls reacted spontaneously and covered her to form a monster named Nullzilla, which was defeated and neutralized by the protectors of Mainframe. The Web creature located Megabyte, took him over and forced him to merge with Hexadecimal, forming a next-gen super-virus called Gigabyte. Gigabyte was eventually neutralized as well, but the Web creature escaped into the bowels of Mainframe, where it began stealing energy to stay alive and grow. Mouse, a mercenary and old friend of Bob's, helped to find the Web Creature, but was almost destroyed by a bomb set by her employer, Turbo. The explosion created a "tear" (an unstable energy-based anomaly) which the Web creature used to create a portal to the Web. The protectors of Mainframe had to team up with Megabyte and Hexadecimal to close the portal. An army of CPU police clashed with an invasion of creatures from the Web. In the midst of the chaos, Megabyte betrayed the alliance (with the CPUs calling the ABCs "treacherous dogs!"), crushing Bob's keytool, Glitch, and sending him into the Web portal before closing it.

=== Season 3 (1997–98) ===
Initially, Mainframe thought they would follow up the second season with a film. The treatment was called Terabyte Rising and was to include flashbacks to the destruction of Mainframe's Twin City. This was dropped but much of it would be used for the fourth season.

The show's third season exhibited a marked improvement in modeling and animation quality due to the advancement of Mainframe Entertainment's software capabilities during the time between seasons. Subtle details, such as eyelashes and shadows, as well as generally more lifelike polygonal characters, were among several visual improvements. The show's target audience shifted to children aged 12 and older, resulting in a darker and more mature storyline. After severing ties with ABC following the second season, the show reached a greater number of households through syndication.

Enzo, freshly upgraded into a Guardian candidate by Bob during the Web incursion, defends Mainframe from Megabyte and Hexadecimal, with Dot and AndrAIa at his side. When Enzo entered a game he could not win, he, AndrAIa, and Frisket changed their icons to game sprite mode and rode the game out of Mainframe. The accelerated game time resulted in Enzo and AndrAIa's aging. Subsequent episodes follow adult versions of Enzo and AndrAIa, who are now in a romantic relationship, as they travel from system to system in search of Mainframe. The older Enzo adopts the name "Matrix" (his and Dot's surname), carrying a weapon named "Gun" and Bob's damaged Glitch. The time spent in games and away from Mainframe hardened both Matrix and AndrAIa: Matrix developed a pathological hatred of viruses, and grew into a muscular, shoot-first-ask-questions-later antihero, while AndrAIa turned into a level-headed warrior. As the season progresses, Matrix and AndrAIa are reunited with Bob and the crew of the Saucy Mare and return to Mainframe, which has been almost completely destroyed by Megabyte and his forces. The group reunites with Dot and the resistance, then heads to the Principal Office for a final battle with Megabyte. Megabyte is defeated by Matrix, but not before Megabyte's handiwork causes the system to crash. All final problems in Mainframe were dealt with by The User restarting the system, setting everything right and restoring everything as it was again for the protagonists, with one major exception: younger and older Enzo now exist simultaneously, as Matrix's icon was still set to "Game Sprite" mode and was not recognized properly by the system when it rebooted, so that the system restored a copy of his younger self. The season concludes in a musical production put on by the binomes recapping the past two seasons plot events.

=== Season 4 (2001) ===
After the end of the third season, two TV movies were produced in 2001: Daemon Rising, which addressed the problem the Guardians were facing in season three (and used much of Terabyte Rising), and My Two Bobs, which brings back a corroded and mutated Megabyte in a cliffhanger ending. The two movies, broken up into eight episodes in its U.S. run on Cartoon Network's Toonami, revealed much of Mainframe's history, including the formation of Lost Angles, Bob's arrival in the system, and the origin of Megabyte and Hexadecimal. The films end with Megabyte in control of the Principal Office, and the characters scattered and about to be hunted down. It is revealed that the nulls still possess their old sentience and intelligence: The heroes manage to put the null that was once Dot's father into a robot, enabling him to move and speak like he used to.

Initial plans for the fourth season included three films broken into 12 episodes, followed by a 13th musical-special episode. Due to a change in deals and budget, the series was reduced to eight episodes. The following plan was to produce 30-minute episodes. These would be edited down to 21 minutes for broadcast and the extra scenes added to the film versions for DVD release. Against the writer's wishes, these scenes were cut from the scripts. After this decision was made, the eighth episode was rewritten to end on a cliffhanger.

Creator Gavin Blair has publicly refused to reveal the plans for the resolution and final episodes, in case he ever got the chance to resolve the cliffhanger.

== In other media ==
=== Video game ===
In 1998, a video game was released based on the TV series, developed and published by EA for the PlayStation. The game received mixed reviews from critics.

=== Webcomic ===
Following its acquisition by the Rainmaker Income Fund in 2006, Mainframe Entertainment was renamed Rainmaker Animation. In 2007, Rainmaker announced plans to create a trilogy of ReBoot films with illustrator/animator Daniel Allen as the lead character designer. In conjunction with the website Zeroes2Heroes, Rainmaker announced an intention to allow fans greater access to the development of the film version's plans and also to the development of a ReBoot webcomic. Fans were given the chance to submit their own art and designs, with the potential to become an artist on the project, and their feedback helped decide which of five ReBoot pitches was developed.

The winning pitch was ReBoot: Arrival. Rainmaker said it would monitor feedback for the webcomic but may not use it as the basis for the company's movie plans. Four fans were chosen to work as artists on the Arrival comic. According to the pitch at the Zeroes2Heroes website, Megabyte's Hunt has developed into a Net-wide war so pervasive that even other viruses united against it. The Users have gone, spending their time in an unending massively multiplayer online game. A sentient system named Gnosis is created as a way to stop Megabyte but goes rogue and begins enslaving other systems in its attempt to gain User-like powers. To stop Gnosis and bring back the Users, two teams of heroes are assembled which will include new characters and Lens the Codemaster, who appeared in the season 2 episode "High Code". Elements of this would be dropped in the comic.

The official ReBoot website was updated with a countdown, which ended on May 30, 2008, at 12:00 a.m. EST. Shortly afterwards, the site was updated with information about the first webcomic from the Arrival team and ongoing community input. The comic, renamed Code of Honor, was viewable after creating an account or using an existing Zeros 2 Heroes account.

A new countdown appeared on the official ReBoot website on August 18, 2008 to launch the second installment of the webcomic. Updates to the comic were posted on Mondays, with two pages each update. The comic ended shortly after Christmas, and surveys were added to the site. The Art of ReBoot, a 104-page hardcover artbook, was published in February 2007 by Beach Studios; it contained copies of various rare and never-before-seen conceptual artwork, with the work of Brendan McCarthy being a major focus.

On July 24, 2009, the ReBoot website was upgraded into the official ReBoot fansite, with the webcomic freely available. The website was set to shut down for July 30, 2012 after several years of inactivity; an announcement on July 27, 2012, revealed that the site would remain open.

==== Synopsis ====
The first Paradigms Lost issue opens with the aftermath of the Hunt: Mainframe is devastated and overrun with Zombinomes, the User is missing, and the entire population is being evacuated to the Super Computer. Worse still, the weakened Guardian Collective is facing viral attacks and uprisings across the entire Net. Turbo blames Bob for this, saying that his views on viruses became widespread and left them weakened. Enzo Matrix, meanwhile, is a star pupil in the Guardian Academy. The viral threat is ended when the Codemasters pledge their help, offering a firmware named Gnosis. Gnosis is uploaded to every System on the Net, erasing all viruses and ending the crisis. The first issue ends with the Codemasters' Guildmaster activating a "Phase Two" for the implemented Gnosis.

The second and third issues had the heroes, now joined by Lens, try to stop the Codemasters from using Gnosis to access the Code itself, allowing the Guildmaster total control. However, Gnosis swiftly decides that it can complete its task better with the Guildmaster deleted, and following that it eliminates the Guardians. Mainframe and 36 other systems are enslaved as power sources for its mission. Dot tries to carry out rebel action in Mainframe, Bob and Lens retreat to the bowels of the Super-Computer to hide, and Enzo is captured and discovers Megabyte (his code retained by Gnosis) is a key Gnosis advisor.

Bob is recruited by Exidy, an entity that is the source of the Code and trapped by Gnosis in the Net; intent on restoring balance and stability, she gives Bob the ability to wield the Code. While the main heroes link up and Bob is sent to take on Gnosis directly, Enzo verbally battles with Megabyte for influence over Gnosis, pointing out that it could accomplish its task quicker if it was cooperative and asked for assistance. When Gnosis comes around to this, Bob decides to allow the weapon to live and reprograms it, and has it restore the Net to the way it was. That done, he frees Exidy and returns home.

=== Unproduced spin-offs ===
==== Television ====
A spinoff called Binomes was planned towards the end of year 2004, featuring a family of Binomes who lived on a "chip farm". The series would have consisted of 52 11-minute episodes, aimed at a pre-school audience, but nothing of this project came to pass after the initial announcement.

==== Film trilogy ====
In June 2008, Rainmaker Animation announced plans for a trilogy of theatrical ReBoot films, with the first to be written by Jon Cooksey. A teaser for the film was released on October 5, 2009, on Rainmaker's official site, and in March 2011, Rainmaker said a ReBoot film remained in the company's plans. In a podcast released April 8, 2013, Rainmaker president and executive producer Michael Hefferon said the film trilogy was no longer being worked on.

=== ReBoot: The Guardian Code ===
A reimagined, live-action/CGI-animated series, ReBoot: The Guardian Code, was announced in 2015, and the first ten episodes premiered on Netflix worldwide (excluding Canada) on March 30, 2018. YTV aired all 20 episodes from June 4 until July 5, 2018. The series follows four teenaged gamers, who are members of an online game's highest-scoring team. Vera is an artificial intelligence who has recruited the team as "Guardians" to physically enter and protect cyberspace. The Guardians battle the Sourcerer, a human hacker. Primary characters from the original series, such as Bob, Dot, and Enzo, are minor characters and only appear in one episode.

=== Documentary ===
An eight part documentary about the show, entitled ReBoot ReWind, was launched on September 24, 2024 on Telus Storyhive. The documentarians also collaborated with Mainframe to remaster the series from its original D-1 tapes, beginning with a remastered version of the first episode released on YouTube on September 10, 2024 to mark the show's thirtieth anniversary.

On March 4th, 2026, it was announced, on the Linus Tech Tips YouTube channel, that all of the original D-1 master tapes have been recovered. High-definition episodes have since been released infrequently via Mainframe's YouTube channel, eventually moving to a bi-weekly release schedule on May 29, 2026.

== Telecast and digital releases ==
=== Television airings ===
ReBoot was first aired on Saturday mornings in Canada on YTV and in the U.S on ABC. It was canceled by ABC after The Walt Disney Company purchased the network in 1996. Episodes continued to air in Canada. Some episodes from the first and second seasons could still be seen in the U.S. when Claster Television distributed them during the 1996–97 season as part of The Power Block, with different shows airing in one timeslot on different days; ReBoot aired on Thursdays. It would be a year until new episodes aired on YTV due to Mainframe's involvement in Beast Wars: Transformers (known as Beasties in Canada) and Shadow Raiders, and the third season aired only on YTV at the time. In April 1999, sixteen months after the third season finale on YTV, it debuted in the US market on Cartoon Network (who would also premiere the fourth and final season in 2000), airing in repeats until 2001.

Production on other shows delayed the fourth season of ReBoot, the eight episodes of which eventually were aired in the U.S., but were also put together as two 90-minute direct-to-DVD features that ended on a cliffhanger season finale. The show's creators Blair and Pearson resigned from Mainframe Entertainment in 2004 to form their own independent studio, The Shop.

The show also aired in the United Kingdom from January 4, 1995 until April 9, 1998, on the ITV network as part of their CITV programming block. When it came to the third season, Meridian only purchased the broadcasting rights for the first 10 episodes of the season and on July 17, 1997, CITV started airing season 3 before anywhere else in the world; however, this run came to a halt in August after the sixth episode, "Where No Sprite Has Gone Before". On February 12, 1998, CITV reaired the show from the season 2 episode "Trust No One" until going into the episodes that had yet to be aired at that point. When "To Mend and Defend" should have aired, the episode "Firewall" was substituted since "To Mend And Defend" received 19 complaints from viewers who claimed "the violence was unacceptable and the characters were inappropriate in a children's programme shown at this time" on its original airing in July 1997. It was not specified, however, why the following episode, "Between a Raccoon and a Hard Place", was omitted from the run. The run was abruptly stopped without warning after the episode "Return of the Crimson Binome", and the remainder of the series wasn't aired due to ITV deeming the content unsuitable. After the abrupt end of the run, several British fans contacted ITV in order to persuade them to air the remaining episodes, and ITV replied saying that the show's low ratings made them wary of acquiring the broadcast rights to the remaining episodes. The success of the series during the production of its second season caused arrangements with networks in 24 countries, including Fuji Television, who was interested in picking the rights to Japan.

The first season was shown in Ireland on RTÉ2 in 1995. In Germany, it premiered on KiKa in 1997.

=== Home media ===
In Canada, four VHS tapes were released in 1995 with individual episodes from the first season through Polygram Video. Each release contained a single episode: "Medusa Bug", "Wizards, Warriors, and a Word from Our Sponsor", "The Great Brain Robbery", and "Talent Night". In the United Kingdom, receiving two VHS releases, but with two episodes each: Volume 1 contained "The Tearing" and "Racing the Clock", while Volume 2 had "The Quick and the Fed" and "Medusa Bug".

The second season was never released, even though Polygram retained the rights to publish the episodes on home video via their deal for the first season. Despite this, in 2000, Mainframe struck a deal with the US A.D. Vision to release the third season on DVD. Shout! Factory acquired the rights to the show in October 2010 and released seasons 1 and 2 as a standalone title on March 1, 2011. On the same date, the complete series went on sale as a box set (titled "ReBoot: The Definitive Mainframe Collection") exclusively through Shout's official online store months before the set was scheduled to be on retail shelves. Seasons 3 and 4 were released on June 28, 2011, as well as a general retail release of the complete series set.

As of 2023, the show is available to watch on streaming service Pluto TV.

== Awards ==
ReBoot has been the recipient of several awards. The show received Gemini Awards for Best Animated Program Series for three straight years between 1995 and 1997, as well as a 1996 Outstanding Technical Achievement Award. Other honors include the 1995 Award of Excellence and Best Animated Program from the Alliance for Children and Television and a Prix Aurora Award in 1996.

Other Gemini Award nominations include "Best Children's or Youth Program or Series" in 1998, and "Best Sound – Comedy, Variety, or Performing Arts Program or Series" for My Two Bobs and "Best Sound – Dramatic Program" for Daemon Rising, both in 2002.

== See also ==
- History of computer animation
- List of amusement rides based on television franchises
- Timeline of computer animation in film and television
