= Shadow Raiders =

- Genre: Action; Science fantasy Space opera
- Developed by: Len Wein; Dan DiDio
- Starring: Donna Yamamoto; Paul Dobson; Mark Oliver; Enuka Okuma; Matt Hill; Scott McNeil; Jim Byrnes; Garry Chalk
- Composer: Robert Buckley
- Country of origin: Canada
- Original language: English
- No. of series: 2
- No. of episodes: 26

Production
- Executive producers: Christopher Brough; Ian Pearson
- Producers: Mark Ralston; B.F. Painter
- Running time: 30 minutes
- Production companies: Mainframe Entertainment; Alliance Atlantis

Original release
- Network: YTV
- Release: September 16, 1998 – June 23, 1999

Shadow Raiders is a Canadian animated television series produced by Mainframe Entertainment and syndicated by The Summit Media Group, that aired from September 16, 1998, to June 23, 1999. The show was loosely based on the Trendmasters toy line, War Planets. The original character designs were created by ReBoot designer, Brendan McCarthy. The series focused on the four warring planets of a solar system called the Cluster as they were forced to set aside their differences and form a coalition against the menace of the Beast Planet.

== Plot ==
Shadow Raiders is set in a five-planet star system known as the Cluster. The four inhabited planets are in a constant state of war, always raiding one another for resources unique to each planet. However, when an alien named Tekla comes from another solar system, she brings a warning: the Beast Planet is coming. Now Graveheart, a humble miner of Planet Rock, must convince the leaders of Fire, Rock, Bone, and Ice to put aside their differences and stand together against the Beast, their new common enemy.

The story begins as Tekla's homeworld of Planet Tek is consumed by the Beast Planet. She and her robotic companion, Voxx, escape to the Cluster through a Beast jump portal to warn them of the impending danger. Tekla is pursued by Beast drones and crash-lands on Planet Ice, where she is rescued by Graveheart. The drones subsequently attack and slaughter the combined forces of Rock and Ice in the area, leaving only Tekla, Graveheart, and Ice King Cryos. The threat convinces Cryos and Graveheart to form an alliance of the Cluster worlds against the Beast Planet.

The first season revolves around the efforts of Graveheart, who has become the de facto leader of the Alliance, to convince the leaders of the other Cluster worlds to join the Alliance. The first planet they visit is his home planet, Planet Rock, but Lord Mantel stubbornly refuses to ally himself with the other worlds after Rock's Battle Moons repel a Beast attack. Graveheart's friend and captain of the Royal Guard, Jade, joins him to help rally planets Fire and Bone to his cause. Fire and Bone join the Alliance.

The Beast forces are tracked to the dead world of Remora, converted into a fortress by the Beast drones. An attack by the combined forces of Ice, Fire, and Bone, with some timely intervention by Rock's Battle Moons, sees the destruction of Remora. However, this only serves to anger the Beast Planet, which emerges from within the Cluster's star and proves its superiority by destroying one of the Battle Moons with a single blast from halfway across the system. It then unleashes its wrath upon the nearest planet; Fire.

The second season focuses on the Alliance's efforts to avoid the unstoppable Beast Planet. Each world in the Cluster is discovered to be equipped with "World Engines", massive drive systems which can propel the planets through space. Using these, the worlds of the Cluster flee the Beast; Fire's engine is damaged and the planet is thus sacrificed in a futile attempt to stop the Beast. Fire's population is moved to the remaining Battle Moons, now down to three following the battle to save Fire. On their journey, they discover Planet Sand, which joins the Alliance, and Planet Jungle, which the Alliance blows up when the Beast tries to consume it; this, too, proves useless. The plants of Jungle live on as a single cutting which is given to Emperor Femur of Bone.

The finale introduces the Prison Planet, a teleport world used as a penal colony. Graveheart and Cryos are captured by a faction of convicts led by Jewelia, a devious woman who takes a liking to Graveheart. Femur and Jade are taken by a second faction commanded by Sternum, Femur's nobler brother, from whom Femur stole the throne of Planet Bone. Convinced that their friends have been slain by the other faction, the two pairs join the fight on the side of their respective faction until the truth is revealed. Meanwhile, Lord Mantel takes control of the Alliance by force, convinced that his forces are superior to the Beast. His arrogance nearly dooms the Alliance and costs Mantel his life when Blokk invades Rock and kills him in single combat. As the Beast Planet is about to consume Planet Rock, the Prison Planet teleports into its path. Graveheart and his group use Sternum's Telepod to travel to Rock. Sternum then teleports the Prison Planet out of the system, taking the Beast Planet with it. Alliance members mistakenly think that Beast Planet would have been destroyed during the teleportation. A final battle between Graveheart and Blokk results in Blokk's demise, Jade's rise to ruler of Planet Rock, and the Alliance's new era of peace. However, the story ends with a scene in a distant part of the galaxy, moments before the destruction of Planet Reptizar at the hands of the Beast Planet.

Although the show ended after its second season, a proposed third would have answered major questions, like the origin of the Beast Planet.

== Setting ==
The main setting of Shadow Raiders is the Cluster, a series of four interdependent worlds. The four main planets – Fire, Rock, Bone, and Ice – have warred for as long as any of them can remember over their natural resources: Fire produces energy, Rock produces metals and minerals, Bone produces food, and Ice produces water, and all four worlds depend on each other to survive.

A large part of the series mythology in the second season is the World Engines, a propulsion system built into the planets of the Cluster (and presumably many other worlds, since two different planets in different solar systems have them) by an ancient alien race. Using five mountain-sized energy thrusters which emerge from the planet's surface, the World Engines can propel a planet through space at great speeds. A combination of an atmospheric shield and artificial gravity generators keep the sudden shift in orbit and lack of a star from killing everyone on the surface. The Prison Planet has a variation known as Teleport Engines, which teleport the world to different locations in space instantly. The same artificial gravity and atmospheric shielding technology is used to protect the inhabitants. Each set of engines is located at the core of its world and can be reached using Telepods, small platforms on the surface of each world. The Telepods send the user to the core of the planet where they can use the computer to move the planet. The Telepods can also be used to move people from one planet to another.

The World Engines are equipped with sensors capable of detecting – but not acting upon – threats to the planet. The AI is able to recommend a course of action, and does not appear to require clearance of any sort, responding to any voice commands given. The Telepod technology was reverse-engineered by Tekla to create a force field generator so anyone can physically fight a Null Matter being without disintegrating on contact.

== Cast ==
- Donna Yamamoto as Tekla
- Paul Dobson as Graveheart
- Mark Oliver as King Cryos
- Enuka Okuma as Jade
- Matt Hill as Prince Pyrus
- Scott McNeil as Pelvus and Blokk
- Jim Byrnes as Grand Vizier
- Garry Chalk as Emperor Femur
- Tasha Simms as Lamprey
- Blu Mankuma as Lord Mantle
- Tegan Moss as Lady Zera
- Janyse Jaud as Jewelia
- Ellen Kennedy as Zuma
- John Payne as Sternum

== War Planets Toy Line ==
The Shadow Raiders series was based on the War Planets toys in 1997-9 from Trendmasters. They were essentially spherical playsets that could store various micro-vehicles and figures. These playsets were released in three waves: 1 (Spring 1997) - Planets Ice (Kryos), Bone (Biowulf), Rock (Krag) and Beast, 2 (Fall 1997) - Fire, Tek and Remora, 3 (Winter 1998) - Sand, Water and Reptizar along with Super-Moons for Fire, Tek and Remora . In 1999, Waves 1 and 2 were re-released in alternate box packaging to complement the TV series with Planet Ice having a variant green/purple color scheme.

Additionally in wide release, collectors enjoyed Series One Battle Moons Rock-Alpha and Omega, Ice-Alpha and Omega, Bone-Alpha and Omega. Over the decades, rare Series Two Battle Moons, Rock-Beta and Zeta, and possibly one-of-a-kind Ice-Beta and Zeta, Bone-Beta and Zeta have appeared via on-line marketplaces. Also, planetoid Tanks were produced, Beast-Scorpozoid, Bone-Bioshredder and Ice-Kryospider. Other Planets, Octozoid, Jungle, Prison and Robotron (with moons Alpha and Omega) only reached the prototype stage as did Super-Planets Beast and Reptizar thence Super-Moons for Sand and Storm.

The series is not strictly set around the toys since more worlds than just Rock have Battle Moons. Several toys were brought out that were based on the Shadow Raiders series but they were either figures of the main characters or vehicles. Specifically, a series of 10" action figures was released; Blokk, Graveheart, Tekla and Pyrus. Also, a series of 4" action figures included Graveheart, Jade, Cryos, Pyrus, Blokk and Beast Drone as well as a few vehicles, Ice-Mine Tank, Ice Bladewing Starfighter and Rock-Dozer Tank. Prototypes were developed for Ice-carrier Aurora, Emperor Femur, plus a new Beast Tank and Drone Glider.

== Episodes ==
=== Series overview ===
Season	Episodes	Originally released	
Season	Episodes	First released	Last released
1	13	September 16, 1998	December 9, 1998
2	13	March 31, 1999	June 23, 1999

=== Season 1 (1998) ===
No. overall	No. in season	Title	Directed by	Script writer	Original release date
1	1	"Behold, the Beast"	Colin Davies & Phil Mitchell	Len Wein	September 16, 1998
With the destruction of planet Tek, the sole survivor, princess Tekla accompanied by Voxx travels to another system to warn all planets about the Beast Invaders. She crash lands on planet Ice where a quarrel between the Royal legion of King Cryos confronts a Rock expeditionary mining squad, including Graveheart. A Beast cohort launches a full-scale attack and only the Ice sovereign, Graveheart and a convalescent Tekla survive the first purge. King Cryos and his aides heal their former adversary and welcome Graveheart in joining the Alliance. Meanwhile, the Beast Armada invades the system and begins preparations.
2	2	"On the Rocks"	Mark Sawers	Christy Marx	September 23, 1998
The Aurora, Cryos' flagship, travels to planet Rock to convince Lord Mantle to join the Alliance. Sadly, the army arrests Graveheart and the Rock King expels the Ice King determining he is still his greatest enemy. Lord Mantle condemns Graveheart to imprisonment. Meanwhile, Blokk the supreme warlord of the Beast launches an invasion on planet Rock with Voyd permission. Jade, a rock commander and a long time friend of Graveheart, releases him and they run to the Core central to activate the planet's defense – the Battle Moons. They succeed but Lord Mantle banishes the “miner” still not believing in the alliance. Despite all odds, Jade agrees to join them, claiming to need to watch her friend's back.
3	3	"Born in Fire"	Mark Schiemann	Marv Wolfman	September 30, 1998
The Aurora travels to planet Fire in hope of convincing prince Pyrus to join them. The obstacle here is the Grand Vizier who doesn't trust strangers. He orders Graveheart and King Cryos to survive a labyrinth of lava where lava dogs are lethal beasts. Meanwhile, Zera, Cryos' daughter, is furious at prince Pyrus for not intervening but a Beast battalion interrupts their argument and wounds the young lord of Fire. However, Jade arrives at the last moment and saves the children. Graveheart and Cryos survive the test and Fire is pleased to join the Alliance.
4	4	"Bad to the Bone"	Dwayne John Beaver	Ken Pontac	October 7, 1998
The Alliance travels to planet Bone but finds a surprise – the Beast planet is already there. Emperor Femur, an arrogant and egotistical leader, agreed to welcome both the Beast and the Alliance on his world. Lamprey the Deceiver and her agents convince the Bone Emperor to side with them and send on the run King Cryos, Graveheart, Jade and prince Pyrus. The young prince of Fire believes he can reason with Femur but is captured by Lamprey and her warriors. Eventually it is revealed that the field generator built on planet Bone will not protect the planet but will instead seal the entrance to any Alliance Battle Fleets. When betrayed, Femur rescues Prince Pyrus and creates a diversion allowing the Aurora to destroy the Field Generator giving their fleets the chance to swarm the invaders. Bone joins the Alliance. Back at their World Fortress, Lamprey tells Blokk and Voyd that she believes Tekla to be responsible for uniting the worlds.
5	5	"Wolf in the Fold"	Anthony Atkins	Christy Marx	October 14, 1998
Lamprey possesses the body of Tekla and intends to crush the fragile Alliance by murdering its leader Graveheart. Her plan fails when she mentions details the real Tekla could not know. She escapes inside Femur's flagship heading back to Bone.
6	6	"Mind War"	Owen M. Hurley	Ken Pontac	October 21, 1998
Tekla and Lamprey battle for the domination of Tekla's body and spirit. Tekla manages to defeat her enemy and regains control of herself.
7	7	"J'Accuse"	Andrew Duncan	Katherine Lawrence	October 28, 1998
Someone frames Jade for murder on planet Fire. On this world the punishment for murder is a death sentence. Graveheart leads prince Pyrus and the Grand Vizier on an investigation and the miner determines the criminal's fingerprints are not those of Jade. When Lamprey the Deceiver and her warriors appear, there is a battle and the group is rescued by princess Tekla and King Cryos. Jade is free and the heroes have saved the day.
8	8	"Blood is Thicker..."	Vladmir Stetoff	Marv Wolfman	November 4, 1998
Someone has kidnapped lady Zera, the young princess of planet Ice. It turns out to be Blokk who wants King Cryos to choose between family and duty. If the Ice king chooses family he will have to abdicate the throne. Cryos and Jade rescue Zera while Tekla and Graveheart defend the palace with prince Pyrus and Femur. At the end, the Ice sovereign surrenders the throne to the army commander Medstar.
9	9	"Rock and Ruin"	George Samilski	Christy Marx	November 11, 1998
The Alliance returns to planet Rock to convince Lord Mantle but Tekla fails. Emperor Femur suggests a cunning plan. However, the Bone emperor's intentions are only to steal the Battle Moons for himself. Latter, Blokk orders his legions to swarm on planet Rock while the defensive moons are away. Graveheart and Tekla head to recapture the Battle Moons and save the day in time.
10	10	"Against all Odds"	Raul Inglis	Marv Wolfman	November 18, 1998
Prince Pyrus and Lady Zera accidentally crash land on planet Remora, a dead world. They must escape Blokk and his millions of warriors.
11	11	"Uneasy Hangs the Head"	Craig McEwen	Len Wein	November 25, 1998
Graveheart believes he is not the right leader for the Alliance. The miner remembers when his younger brother Mica died on a trip to planet Fire. He failed him. Jade consoles her old friend and convinces him to stand firm.
12	12	"Ragnarok, Part One"	James E. Taylor	Steve Cuden	December 2, 1998
The assault on planet Remora begins. Cryos is once more sovereign of planet Ice. Bone, Fire and Ice stand against their common enemy. On planet Ice, Tekla and Voxx search for a special weapon underground. Blokk, Lamprey, and Voyd unleash the ultimate power of Remora against their enemies. Blokk fights on and Emperor Femur abandons his comrades leaving them to fend for themselves. Remora fires and destroys half the battle fleets.
13	13	"Ragnarok, Part Two"	James Boshier	Len Wein	December 9, 1998
The Alliance stands against their greatest enemy. Remora unleashes even more of its offensive strike forces and damages the Ice and Fire battle fleets greatly. In the end, Jade and the Battle Moons rescue the day and it seems Remora is destroyed. However, the Beast Planet shows up and annihilates one of the Battle Moons.

=== Season 2 (1999) ===
No. overall	No. in season	Title	Directed by	Script writer	Original release date
14	1	"Worlds within Worlds"	Owen Hurley	Christy Marx	March 31, 1999
The Beast Planet demonstrates its might, launching an armada to attack Fire while training its powerful cannons on the Battle Moons. A stray blast threatens to destroy Ice, but Tekla and Lady Zera discover world engines hidden within the planet, which move it out of the path of the blast.
15	2	"This is the Way the World Ends..."	Steve Ball	Marv Wolfman	April 7, 1999
The Beast Planet targets planet Fire. Graveheart and Tekla must hurry to find the world engines. During the invasion, Graveheart is injured while saving prince Pyrus. The Grand Vizier witnesses the sacrifice and reconsiders his judgment towards the outlanders. In the end, everything is lost for planet Fire but the Grand Vizier sacrifices himself and tells prince Pyrus that his new friends are indeed worthy ones. Prince Pyrus orders the Vizier to evacuate with the rest of his people, because he still needs his guidance and company. The Vizier disobeys, saying that Pyrus is old enough to rule, and that the Vizier does not want to die a coward. The Grand Vizier uses the world engines to ram Planet Fire onto the Beast Planet's claw, hoping that it will destroy the Beast Planet, The Beast Planet consumes planet Fire anyway, killing the Grand Vizier.
16	3	"Period of Adjustment"	J. Falconer	Ken Pontac	April 14, 1999
Emperor Femur and Pelvus must make good their commitment to return to the Alliance. They agree to feed all the people of the Alliance with the resources of Bone, and so Bone rejoins the Alliance.
17	4	"Blaze of Glory"	Andrew Duncan	Dan DiDio	April 21, 1999
Captain Blaze and his renegade squad steal one of the Battle Moons and attempt to regain their lost honor in destroying the Beast Planet. But when Blokk and his battle fleets almost seize Prince Pyrus, Captain Blaze returns to save his young lord. At the command center, Jade is contacted by Lord Mantle to finish their bargain.
18	5	"Sandstorm"	Craig McEwen	E. Bull and W. Shetterly	April 28, 1999
The Alliance travels to planet Sand. Lady Zera meets one of the Sand People, Zuma. She is a telepath. In the end, the great Sand People save the day with their mind power.
19	6	"Girls Night Out"	George Roman Samilski	Brooks Wachtel	May 5, 1999
Jade, princess Tekla, Lady Zera, Pelvus and Zuma head for "Moon Over Mayhem" to socialize. In an attempt to reconcile, Tekla gives Jade the key of the Cluster defenses. During this pleasure trip they are attacked by Fire's pirates and smugglers as well as Lamprey and her drones.
20	7	"Timebomb"	Raul Inglis	Art Holcomb	May 12, 1999
The Alliance of the Cluster find Planet Jungle. They are willing to sacrifice this non-living world to trap the Beast Planet and Blokk's forces. On a trip to planet Jungle they place explosives but living plants ask for their help. Tekla finds out the planet's world engines were destroyed long ago. The vegetation on this world is doomed. A sentient plant asks Femur to preserve a small part of the planet's life. Planet Jungle explodes, but the Beast Planet is unharmed.
21	8	"Embers of the Past"	Mark Sawers	Gillian Horvath	May 19, 1999
The Alliance is surprised when Planet Fire catches up to them. Apparently the Grand Vizier is alive but his personality seems different. It is revealed that it is not the Grand Vizier but a creation of the Beast planet. The Alliance retreats into a nebula to evade destruction from Blokk and his battle forces.
22	9	"Divided We Stand"	Owen Hurley	Christy Marx	May 26, 1999
The Alliance detects a signal from a mysterious planet which is determined to be a battleground. Graveheart and Cryos are traveling together as are Jade and Femur. The two groups crash land separately and lose contact with their fleet. The miner and the Ice King are found by Jewelia and her band of criminals. Jewelia develops a liking for the former rock soldier. Jade and Femur meet Sternum who is a tough warrior from planet Bone. Sternum relocates the prison planet to another location evading the scanners of any possible enemies.
23	10	"Nor Iron Bars a Cage"	Steve Ball and Sebastian Brodin	Marv Wolfman	June 2, 1999
It turns out the prison planet can teleport itself. Sternum is revealed to have been Femur's brother. Tekla and Pyrus must confront Lord Mantle, who wants to rule the Alliance. Mantle shuts down the defenses for the entire Alliance endangering the fleet. Meanwhile, Jewelia and Graveheart lead an attack on Sternum's camp but are driven off by its superior arsenal. Sternum was the rightful ruler of Bone before being overthrown by his brother and seeks revenge on Femur. Graveheart and Jewelia retreat while Tekla has no choice but to pass over leadership to Mantle. The Rock King reveals a key which is the defense key given by Tekla to Jade. On the prison planet Jade is set to kill Femur.
24	11	"Death of a King"	James E. Taylor	Christy Marx	June 9, 1999
Both factions of the prison planet prepare for their next battle. Jade helps Sternum with the maintenance around the base while Cryos and Graveheart devise a plan to get to the teleport engines. Meanwhile Tekla, Zera and Pyrus receive a summons from Lord Mantle. Mantle reveals to the three his intent of wiping out the Beast Planet with an all-out assault from the battle moons. Pyrus objects because his people now live on the battle moons. Back on the prison planet, Jewelia begins her assault on Sternum's base while Cryos and Graveheart move underground. Detecting enemy presence in the underground and threatening Femur to provide Jade with backup, while Sternum intercepts Graveheart and Cryos. Both groups engage with each other. Graveheart seeks to avenge Jade's supposed death. Jade herself narrowly escapes assassination from Jewelia's sniper. In retaliation for Rock's attack, the Beast sends out its armada which wipes out Rock's defenses easily. Blokk and his drone infiltrate Mantle's throne room. Mantle calls back the battle moons once he realizes that his moons are doing no damage. Blokk and Mantle engage in battle; Blokk proves victorious and kills the Rock Lord.
25	12	"The Long Road Home"	Anthony Atkins	Marv Wolfman	June 16, 1999
The Beast has captured Planet Rock, and starts to round up the planets' population. On the Prison Planet, the fight between the two factions continues, but Graveheart, Cryos, Jade, and Femur are reunited. The Sand people find the Prison Planet and guide the planet back to the Alliance system. The planet teleports back, appearing between the Beast Planet and Planet Rock. As the Beast Planet's claw closes onto the Prison Planet, Sternum activates the teleport engines, teleporting both the Prison and Beast Planets to parts unknown.
26	13	"Ascension"	George Roman Samilski	Ken Pontac & Dan DiDio	June 23, 1999
The episode opens with Lord Mantle's funeral. As Graveheart speaks and the Alliance watches, Blokk kills three Rock soldiers. Tekla, Pyrus and Zera confront Jade to demand why she would betray them, and Graveheart reveals that it was to convince Mantle to lend them the Battle Moons for the fight with Remora. Graveheart then asks Jade to be the next ruler of Rock. After an argument, she agrees and goes for the test. Blokk enters the World Engine and kills all the Rock soldiers except the captain. He steers the planet towards the closest star. He then contacts the Alliance and demands that Graveheart face him. Cryos informs Graveheart, who goes to meet Blokk in the world engines as Jade takes the royalty test. She passes the test. The Graveheart battles Blokk while Voxx, Tekla and Cryos go to repair the engines and get the planet away from the star. Voxx repairs the world engine allowing Jade to steer the planet away as Graveheart finishes Blokk off by plunging the Force field Generator inside him. In the aftermath, Jade makes Graveheart an official Rock citizen, and the series ends with the Beast Planet devouring another planet, the subtitle below echoing the first episode: "Planet Reptizar: On Doomsday".

== Cancellation ==
The series had originally been planned to produce three seasons with 40 episodes in total. But despite favorable ratings of the season two's initial broadcasting, the toy line sales were unacceptable in the program's production country, prompting the series cancellation due to the program's sole existence as the toy line's promotion, eliminating any possibility of the third season's production.

== Home releases ==
The entire series was released on DVD by ADV Films in the year 2000. The series was spread over six volumes. Bonus features on the DVDs included data files on the characters, animation turnarounds, and a series trailer, featuring original animation not seen in the series. Much like fellow Mainframe Entertainment series ReBoot, the North American DVDs are long out of print and rare, though tend to fetch substantially less than other Mainframe DVDs.

Volume Number	Volume Title	Episodes Contained
1	Uncommon Hero	Behold the Beast, On the Rocks, Born in Fire, Bad to the Bone
2	A Dangerous Enemy	Wolf in the Fold, Mind War, J'Accuse, Blood is Thicker...
3	Final Hours	Rock and Ruin, Against All Odds, Uneasy Hangs the Head, Ragnarok parts 1 and 2
4	Alliance Attacks!	Worlds Within Worlds, This Is The Way The World Ends..., Period of Adjustment, Blaze of Glory
5	New Worlds!	Sandstorm, Girls Night Out, Timebomb, Embers of the Past
6	Final Conflict	Divided We Stand, Nor Iron Bars a Cage, Death of a King, The Long Road Home, Ascension

Both complete seasons are available in two sets in the United Kingdom. Eight volumes were released in Germany (English + German audio) and six volumes were released in Russia, both also containing all 26 episodes.

== See also ==
- Trendmasters makers of War Planets
- Mainframe Entertainment producers of Shadow Raiders
- List of Shadow Raiders characters
