= Art Holcomb =

Art Holcomb (born December 31, 1955) is an American comic book creator, screenwriter and playwright.

At age 13, he began his writing career in the sixth grade (at age 13) when one of his plays, The Birnbaum Guide to Hell on Five Dollars a Day was professionally performed by the American Conservatory Theater.

He has published poetry, essays and short stories and has written more than 50 comic book stories for franchises such as X-Men, as well as original and licensed properties for Defiant Comics, Valiant Comics, Acclaim, Big Entertainment, Funimation, Marvel Comics, and DC Comics. His screen work has appeared on UPN, the Sci-Fi Channel and the Showtime Channel and is the co-founder and editor-in-chief of creative development firm Andromedia Entertainment, which consults on and adapts screenplays into graphic novels, creating some of the earliest examples of the “illustrated screenplays”.

== Works ==
Writer

- Eternal Warrior (1992)
- Dogs of War (1994)
- Professor Xavier and the X-Men (1995)
- Killer Instinct (1996)
- Magic: The Gathering-Elder Dragons (1996)
- Eternal Warriors: Archer & Armstrong (1997)
- Eternal Warriors: Time & Treachery (1997)
- Eternal Warriors: Blackworks (1998)
- Eternal Warriors: Digital Alchemy (1998)
- Eternal Warriors: Mog (1998)
- Eternal Warriors: The Immortal Enemy (1998)

Editor

- First Wave (2000)
