= Trendmasters =

American toy company

- Industry: Toys
- Founded: 1989
- Defunct: 2002
- Fate: Closed; assets acquired by Jakks Pacific.
- Headquarters: St. Louis, Missouri, United States
- Key people: Russell Hornsby (co-founder); Leo Hauser (co-founder)

Trendmasters was an American toy company based in St. Louis, Missouri, notable for its figures based on the Godzilla series, including figures based on the 1998 film of the same name. Trendmasters closed in 2002, and its intellectual property assets were acquired by Jakks Pacific.

== History ==
Following the success of its initial Godzilla toys in 1994, Trendmasters expanded its product range to include toys based on various licenses. These included the series Voltron: The Third Dimension, as well as films and television programs such as Nova's Ark, Battlefield Earth, Gamera, Forbidden Planet, Independence Day, Mars Attacks!, Extreme Ghostbusters, Lost in Space, Gumby, Cardcaptors, The Spooktacular New Adventures of Casper, Dexter's Laboratory, and The Powerpuff Girls.

In 1999, the company released a line of animated watches called C-watches. These watches allowed the user to set alarms for Mon-Fri, alerted the user to mealtimes, and had many other uses and animations. Special editions of these watches included the *NSYNC edition, Austin Powers Edition, Pro Wrestling Edition, Pokémon Edition, Star Wars Edition, etc.

Trendmasters produced the War Planets toy line, which led to the creation of the television series Shadow Raiders; however, the series is off the air and the figures have ceased production since Trendmasters closed. In addition, the company created the Rumble Robots toy line in 2001, as well as the Wuv Luv line of fuzzy toys. Trendmasters also created the KittyCatz and PuppyDogz line for the game Petz, which contains the combined games Dogz and Catz. They were also ingame as advertising for the real toys. Petz 5, the last old-school style Petz version, made in 2002, still had these, and there was no update system to get these out of the game. The company also produced the Starcastle line, a series of fantasy castle playsets for girls, each with an interior containing hidden secrets and treasures depending on the theme of the castle.

Although the figures based on the classic Godzilla series are often attributed to Trendmasters' rise in popularity, the failure of the extravagant toy line from the 1998 film is sometimes blamed for its ultimate demise – retailers refused figures for Godzilla: The Series due to the failure of the 1998 toy line. However, while the 1998 Godzilla line proved to be a loss for many retailers, Trendmasters profited for several years.

== Legacy ==
Trendmasters is remembered for the 1998 Godzilla film products made by the company have become some of the most purchased and expensive vintage toy items in online stores such as eBay and Amazon due to their rarity.

Many of Trendmasters' employees went on to work at Cepia, which was founded after Trendmasters closed.
