= Paul Dobson (actor) =

British-born Canadian voice actor

- Citizenship: United Kingdom; Canada
- Occupation: Voice actor
- Years active: 1993–present
- Relatives: Michael Dobson (brother); Brian Dobson (brother)

Paul Dobson is a British-born Canadian voice actor who works for various studios in Vancouver, British Columbia, Canada. He performed the voices of Naraku and Myoga from Inuyasha, Doctor Doom from Fantastic Four: World's Greatest Heroes, Juggernaut from X-Men: Evolution, Happosai from Ranma ½, Enzo Matrix from ReBoot, Folken Fanel from the Ocean dub of Escaflowne, Zarbon from the Ocean dub of Dragon Ball Z, Graveheart from Shadow Raiders, various characters from several Transformers series (Beast Machines, Armada, Energon and Cybertron), Moo from Monster Rancher, Graham Aker from Mobile Suit Gundam 00 series, Sensei Wu from Lego Ninjago: Masters of Spinjitzu and various voices in Warhammer 40,000: Dawn of War video game series.

== Personal life ==
Dobson has two brothers. His older brother Michael Dobson and younger brother Brian Dobson are also voice actors.

== Filmography ==
=== Animation ===
List of voice performances in animation
Year	Title	Role	Notes	Source
1993–95	Exosquad	Thrax	Debut	
1995–96	G.I. Joe Extreme	Tracker		
1995–96	Skysurfer Strike Force	Micky Flannigan, Replicon, Chronozoid		
1995–97	Street Fighter	Fei Long, E. Honda, Balrog, Vega, T. Hawk, Dee Jay, Birdie		
1997–98	Salty's Lighthouse	Big Stack, Hercules, Captain Zero, Izzy Gomez, Sea Rogue, Old Rusty, Scoop, Cappy, Tramper, Billy Shoepack, Chooch, Mr. Boffo, Mr. Socko, Stoney, Municipal Garbage Corporation	Tugs segments	
1997–2001	ReBoot	Adult Enzo Matrix, Various characters		
1998–99	Shadow Raiders	Graveheart		
1998–99	RoboCop: Alpha Commando	Additional Voices		
1998–2001	Fat Dog Mendoza	Sal the Giant Fish, Brett, Brett the Sock Puppet, Brother of the Bull Moose Lodge, Super Salesman		
1999	Dragon Tales	Giant of Nod, additional voices		
1999	Roswell Conspiracies: Aliens, Myths and Legends	Additional Voices		
1999–2000	Beast Machines: Transformers	Tankor, Obsidian, Diagnostic Drone		
1999–01	Sherlock Holmes in the 22nd Century	Guest Voices		
1999–01	Spider-Man Unlimited	The Hunter		
2000	Capertown Cops			
2000–01	Kong: The Animated Series	Chiros	Doctor (in "Billy")	
2000–02	What About Mimi?	Additional Voices		
2001	D'Myna Leagues	Carney		
2001–02	Aaagh! It's the Mr. Hell Show!	Jules Winnfield, Tommy, Santa Claus, Lion King, Crab		
2001–02	Ultimate Book of Spells	Additional Voices		
2001–03	X-Men: Evolution	Cain Marko/ Juggernaut, Marius Boudreaux		
2001–03	Sitting Ducks	Additional Voices		
2002–04	He-Man and the Masters of the Universe	Tri-Klops, Man-E-Faces, Snake Face, Trap Jaw, Carnivus		
2003	Transformers: Go-Bots	Aero-Bot, Beast-Bot		
2004	The Cramp Twins	Polisher Man		
2005–06	Firehouse Tales	Additional Voices		
2006–07	Fantastic Four: World's Greatest Heroes	Doctor Doom, Mole Man, Captain Ultra		
2006–08	3-2-1 Penguins!	Midgel	TV series	
2007–08	George of the Jungle	Ape, Undead Explorer		
2009–10	RollBots		Grouped under "Starring"	
2010–15	Strawberry Shortcake's Berry Bitty Adventures	Mr. Longface, Berrykin Bloom		
2011–22	Ninjago	Sensei Wu, Falcon, Acidicus, No-Eyed Pete, Noble, Rufus MacAllister, General Kozu, Neuro, Ghoultar, Flintlocke	Also TV specials	
2011–20	Superbook	Various characters		
2012	Action Dad	Glassjaw, Super Ninjoid, Manager, TV Salesman, Vault Voice, Manny, Thug, Cop		
2013	Lego Star Wars: The Yoda Chronicles	Ki-Adi-Mundi		
2015	Pac-Man and the Ghostly Adventures	Dentures of Doom, Mummy Wizard	Episode: "Indiana Pac and the Dentures of Doom"	
2015	Lego Star Wars: Droid Tales	Ki-Adi-Mundi		
2015–18	Dinotrux	D-Structs, Smash-Itt, Otto #4, Dozeratops #2	Also Dinotrux Supercharged	
2017	Tarzan and Jane	Dr. Porter, Earl of Greystroke		
2017–19	My Little Pony: Friendship Is Magic	Commander Ironhead, Meathead Pony	2 episodes	
2023–24	Ninjago: Dragons Rising	Master Wu	2 episodes	
2023–24	Kaeloo	Mr. Cat	English dub	

=== Anime ===
List of English dubbing performances in anime
Year	Title	Role	Notes	Source
1993–2002	Ranma ½	Happosai, Various characters	Also OVAs	
1994	Tico of the Seven Seas			
1994	Green Legend Ran	Lazlo		
1994	Kishin Corps	Hans Liengel, Sgt. Tamura, Various characters		
1995	Fatal Fury: Legend of the Hungry Wolf	Billy Kane		
1995	Fatal Fury 2: The New Battle	Wolfgang Krauser		
1995	Ronin Warriors	Anubis, Additional Voices		
1995	The Hakkenden	Kobungo Inuta, Samojiro Aboshi, Additional Voices		
1995	Ogre Slayer	Otakemaru, Ogre, Mr. Ohno		
1995	Mega Man: Upon a Star	Eddie		
1996	Please Save My Earth	Shion, Raozo Matsudaira		
1996	Sanctuary	Chiaki Asami, Okamura		
1996	Maison Ikkoku	Saotome		
1996–1997	Dragon Ball Z	Zarbon, Dodoria, Dr. Brief, Korin	Ocean dub	
1997	Key the Metal Idol	Komoda, Tamari's Assistant		
1998	Night Warriors: Darkstalkers' Revenge	Demitri Maximoff, Demitri's Servant		
1998	Monkey Magic	Dearth Voyd, North General, Master Subodye, Bar Owner, Official, Underworld Monsters		
1999	Brain Powered	Captain Laite, Kanan's Father		
1999	Silent Möbius	Gigelf Liqueur, Ralph Bombers, Board Member		
1999–2001	Monster Rancher	Moo, Captain Horn, Captain Jell		
2000	Mobile Suit Gundam Wing	Rashid Kurama, Lt. Nichol, Field Marshall Noventa, Inspector Acht		
2000–01	The Vision of Escaflowne	Folken Fanel, Reeden, Kio	Ocean/Bandai dub	
2001	Saber Marionette J	Hikozaemon Oekubo, Dr. Hess, Führer Faust		
2002	The SoulTaker	Richard Vincent		
2002	Trouble Chocolate	Macaroni	Episodes 8, 16	
2002–2003	Hamtaro	Howdy		
2002–2003	Transformers: Armada	Sideways, Nemesis Prime		
2002–2004	Project ARMS series	Jabberwock		
2002–2006	Inuyasha	Naraku, Myoga, Ginta, Kagome's Teacher, Onigumo, Kagewaki Hitomi, Bird of Paradise leader (left)		
2003	Master Keaton	Charlie Chapman, Tomski, Vladimir Kovalenko	Also OVAs	
2003	Zoids: Fuzors	Marvis		
2003–2005	MegaMan NT Warrior	Dr. Wily, MagicMan	Also Axess	
2004	Dokkoida?!	Kurisaburo Kurinohana/Dr. Marronflower, Additional Voices		
2004–2005	Transformers: Energon	Rodimus		
2005	Human Crossing	Various characters		
2005	Tokyo Underground	Suijen	Episodes 10, 11, 19, 22	
2005	Starship Operators	Peter Spikes, Tito Langar		
2005	Hikaru no Go	Toya Meijin		
2005–2006	Transformers: Cybertron	Overhaul, Landmine		
2006	Mobile Suit Gundam SEED Destiny	Sato, Shinn's Father		
2006	Ōban Star-Racers	Avatar		
2006	Shakugan no Shana	Alastor	Season 1	
2006	.hack//Roots	Naobi/Yata		
2007	Elemental Gelade	Arc Aile Chief	Episodes 13, 23	
2007	Ayakashi: Samurai Horror Tales	Yoshikuni Sakai	Bake Neko arc	
2007	Ghost in the Shell: Stand Alone Complex	Geir Yasuoka, Matsuoka	The Laughing Man OVA	
2007–2008	Black Lagoon series	E.O. Captain, Elvis, Ito, Sakharov, Morozumi		
2008	Powerpuff Girls Z	Gilbert/Gigi the Great, Mummy Man, Caucasus Leo/Goliath, Funta/Beetle Bob		
2008–2009	Mobile Suit Gundam 00 series	Graham Aker		
2012	Kurozuka	Benkei, Okina		
2012–2013	The Little Prince	The Snake		
2012–2013	Inuyasha: The Final Act	Naraku, Myoga, Ginta		
2013	Black Lagoon: Roberta's Blood Trail	Gustavo, Ronny the Jaws		
2017	Gintama°	Heiji Kozenigata		
2020–present	Yashahime: Princess Half-Demon	Myoga		

=== Films ===
List of voice and English dubbing performances in direct-to-video, television and feature films
Year	Title	Role	Notes	Source
1993	Christopher the Christmas Tree	Shepard #1, Roman General	TV movie	
1994	Ranma ½: Big Trouble in Nekonron, China	Happosai, Daikokusei		
1994	Ranma ½: Nihao, My Concubine	Happosai, Sarutoru		
1994	Project A-ko	Gail	Versus OVAs	
1994	The Story of Christmas			
1995	Fatal Fury: The Motion Picture	Hauer Blitzer, Billy Kane, Additional Voices		
1996	Galaxy Express 999	Count Mecha		
1997	Tales from the Far Side II			
1997	Grey: Digital Target	Grey		
1997	Dragon Ball Z: Dead Zone	Nicky	Ocean dub	
1998	Dragon Ball Z: The Tree of Might	Amond	Ocean dub	
1998	Dragon Ball Z: The World's Strongest	Dr. Kochin, Kishime	Ocean dub	
1998	Rudolph the Red-Nosed Reindeer: The Movie	Dasher		
1998	The Mighty Kong	Additional Voices		
2000	Robin and the Dreamweavers	Various characters		
2000	A Monkey's Tale	Gavin		
2001	A Christmas Adventure... From a Book Called Wisely's Tales	Rockin' Raccoon		
2001	ReBoot: My Two Bobs	Enzo Matrix		
2002	Jin-Roh: The Wolf Brigade	Additional Voices		
2002	Escaflowne	Folken Fanel, Reeden, Kio	Ocean/Bandai dub	
2003	G.I. Joe: Spy Troops	Barrel Roll		
2004	Inuyasha the Movie: Affections Touching Across Time	Myoga		
2004	Bionicle 2: Legends of Metru Nui	Nidhiki, Whenua		
2004	Inuyasha the Movie: The Castle Beyond the Looking Glass	Naraku, Myoga		
2005	Inuyasha the Movie: Swords of an Honorable Ruler	Myoga		
2005	Bionicle 3: Web of Shadows	Whenua, Sidorak		
2005	Kong: King of Atlantis	Rebel Leader		
2006	Kong: Return to the Jungle	Hunter Stag III, Hunter Stag I, Reporter 2		
2008	Silent Möbius films	Lucifer Hawk, Gigelf Liqueur	Ocean dub	
2009	Sword of the Stranger	Lord Akaike		
2009	Hulk Versus	Hogun		
2009	The Strawberry Shortcake Movie: Sky's the Limit	Mr. Longface		
2010	Planet Hulk	Beta Ray Bill		
2010	Strawberry Shortcake: The Berryfest Princess Movie	Mr. Longface, Berrykin Bloom		
2011	Mobile Suit Gundam 00 the Movie: A Wakening of the Trailblazer	Graham Aker		
2011	Thor: Tales of Asgard	Hogun		
2011	Underworld: Endless War	Lycan Krandrill		
2015	Mune: Guardian of the Moon	Yule, Twin Snakes		
2017	Barbie Dolphin Magic	Hugo		
2017	My Little Pony: The Movie	Additional Voices		

=== Live-action ===
List of voice performances in live-action films and series
Year	Title	Role	Notes	Source
1998–1999	The New Addams Family	Cousin Itt		
2015	Chappie	Police Robot		

=== Video games ===
List of voice and English dubbing performances in video games
Year	Title	Role	Notes	Source
2000	Kessen	Ieyasu Tokugawa	English dub	
2003	Hulk	Ravage, Madman/Philip Sterns, Dr. Geoffrey Crawford		
2003	Mobile Suit Gundam: Encounters in Space	Shin Matsunaga	English dub	
2004	Warhammer 40,000: Dawn of War	Gabriel Angelos, Warboss Orkamungus, Chaos Space Marines, Raptors, Chaos Rhinos, Chaos Predators, Possessed Chaos Space Marines, Obliterators, Gretchinz		
2004	Inuyasha: The Secret of the Cursed Mask	Naraku, Myoga	English dub	
2004	Dragon Tales: Learn & Fly With Dragons	Giant of Nod		
2005	Ys: The Ark of Napishtim	Quval, August, Gazel	English dub	
2005	He-Man: Defender of Grayskull	Tri-Klops, Robot Guard		
2005	Inuyasha: Feudal Combat	Naraku	English dub	
2005	Warhammer 40,000: Dawn of War – Winter Assault	General Sturnn, Chaos Sorcerers		
2005	Devil Kings	Zaan		
2006	Warhammer 40,000: Dawn of War – Dark Crusade	Chaos Lord Eliphas the Inheritor		
2008	George of the Jungle and the Search for the Secret	Ape		
2010	Warhammer 40,000: Dawn of War II – Chaos Rising	Gabriel Angelos, Chaos Predators, Chaos Space Marines		
2010	Dead Rising 2	Sgt. Dwight Boykin		
2011	Trinity: Souls of Zill O’ll	Angildan, Male Criminal	English dub	
2011	Marvel vs. Capcom 3: Fate of Two Worlds	Doctor Doom, Shuma-Gorath		
2011	Warhammer 40,000: Dawn of War II – Retribution	Gabriel Angelos, Lysandros, Chaos Predators, Chaos Space Marines		
2011	Dynasty Warriors: Gundam 3	Mr. Bushido	English dub	
2011	Dead Rising 2: Off the Record	Sgt. Dwight Boykin		
2011	Ultimate Marvel vs. Capcom 3	Doctor Doom, Shuma-Gorath		
2016	Homeworld: Deserts of Kharak	Kapisi Captain, Coalition Strike Fighter, Gaalsien Fleet Ops		
2017	Need for Speed Payback			
2018	Dragalia Lost	Shishimai	English dub	

=== Theme parks ===
List of voice performances in Amusement parks
Year	Title	Role	Notes	Source
2012	Marvel Super Heroes 4D	Doctor Doom		
