= Lego Ninjago =

Lego theme based on ninjas

- The logo used between 2011 and mid-2019
- Sub‑themes: The Lego Ninjago Movie
- Subject: Ninjas
- Availability: 2011–present
- Total sets: 570 sets
- TV series: Ninjago; Ninjago: Dragons Rising; Ninjago: Dragons' Fury
- Official website

Lego Ninjago (IPA: /nɪnˈdʒɑːɡoʊ/, nin-JAH-goh) is a Lego theme that was created in 2011 and a flagship brand of The Lego Group. It is the first theme to be based on ninjas since the discontinuation of the Lego Ninja theme in 2000. It was produced to coincide with the animated television series Ninjago, which was superseded in 2023 by a new series titled Ninjago: Dragons Rising.

The theme focused on a group of six teenage ninjas, led by the legendary Green Ninja, Lloyd Garmadon. The ninja characters are "Elemental Masters", which means that they each possess elemental powers. They are also trained in the fictional martial art of "Spinjitzu" by their ancient and wise teacher, Master Wu, giving them the ability to fight against the forces of evil. In 2023, new characters were introduced for the replacement/continuation series.

Lego Ninjago enjoyed phenomenal popularity and success in its first year, and a further two years were commissioned before a planned discontinuation in 2013. However, after a brief break, the line was continued after feedback from fans and has been in production ever since. The Lego Group developed the theme into a media franchise aimed primarily at young and pre-teenage boys, which has produced books, video games and theme park attractions. The popularity of the TV series and the toy line resulted in the production of The Lego Ninjago Movie, released in 2017, which was the third film in The Lego Movie franchise. A live-action film based on Ninjago is in development. On January 14, 2026, the Ninjago theme celebrated its fifteenth anniversary, making it one of The Lego Group's longest-running and most successful original themes.

== Overview ==
The main focus of the line is the formation and consequent exploits and trials of a group of teenage ninja, battling against the various forces of evil. The theme originally introduced five main characters with an original storyline set in a fictional world that fused the ninja theme with dragons, modern vehicles and futuristic mech-robots. In the theme's storyline, the ninja characters are trained in the art of "Spinjitzu" a fictional martial art that allows them to fight their opponents. The storyline is set within the fictional world of Ninjago, a place inspired by East Asian culture. Simon Lucas, Senior Creative Director, commented, "With Lego Ninjago, we took inspiration from a Japanese starting point, but it developed into something of a massive mashup of cultures, not just one particular culture."

== Concept and creation ==
Tommy Andreasen's original 2009 concept drawing depicting the main characters

=== Background ===
The origin of the Ninjago theme lies in the earlier Lego Ninja theme, which was released in 1998. This theme was based on feudal Japan and featured ninjas, fortresses, catapults and horses. It originated in the Lego Castle theme that had been in existence since 1978. In 2000, Lego Ninja was replaced by Knights' Kingdom. These themes eventually resulted in the introduction of the Ninjago theme, which included some of the original concepts of the Ninja theme, such as the dragons and fortresses, but also introduced modern day elements.

=== Research ===
The focus on ninja was also the direct result of ethnographic research of children's interests. The Ninjago product development team in Fort Lee, New Jersey spent several days monitoring groups of eight to ten-year-old boys to gauge their reactions to various concepts and storyboards, including ninjas, underwater adventures and futuristic cities. The chosen concept then went through several rounds of testing to refine the final product in order to produce a successful line. This rigorous testing and development resulted in the Ninjago line being delayed by a year. Cerim Manovi, Senior Design Manager for the theme stated, "Ninjas crystallised themselves because we were, like: 'What’s the greatest hero entry point?' We showed them superheroes, everything – but ninjas just grabbed kids right there."

During the development process, the Ninjago team took a trip to the Ninja Museum of Igaryu, located four hours to the west of Tokyo, Japan in order to get inspiration for the theme. This allowed the designers to gather historic details from the 15th century ninja building, whilst also developing ideas about how to give these historic elements a contemporary appeal.

=== Story concept ===
The initial story concept for the theme originated in a rough sketch created by Tommy Andreasen on a Friday evening in 2009. The sketch depicted several elemental ninja and the word "Spinjago". This idea was later developed into the fictional martial art of "Spinjitzu", which was a combination of the words "spin" and "ninjitsu". The development team later used this as the basis for the minifigure spinner action toys. The rough sketch was sent to an artist in Canada called Craig Sellars who created an internal concept image of the characters over the weekend.

The Ninjago theme then employed the use of an original story that would appeal to young teenage boys, by creating a cast of characters that focused on a group of ninja heroes and a wide variety of villains. Senior Creative Manager, Tommy Andreasen commented, "It wasn't until we started developing a fantasy theme that we saw it actually can become a building toy as well. So you can put a ninja on a dragon - the kids found that appealing and very natural. But figuring out the enemies of the ninja was more of a challenge and we tested a lot of things there".

=== Character and universe development ===
The ninja characters were given different coloured costumes and unique elemental powers, which gave them distinctive personalities. The team also came up with the concept of "Spinjitzu", which was the main fighting method in the show. Andreasen commented, "we wanted to make sure that it was something that would look great on TV, lightning coming out of tornadoes and stuff like that. The toy representation of that was the spinner". The fantasy element was later combined with the introduction of advanced technology into the Ninjago universe. Although the original intention was to remain true to the historical setting, the Ninjago team decided that technology could be introduced without having a detrimental effect on the characters.

The introduction of skeletons as the main villains in the storyline was also the result of research with children. The children in the research groups were given the choice of six options, including monkeys, skeletons, robots and lizard people. The overwhelming preference was for skeletons, which the children considered to be "real" fantasy villains. Andreasen recalled, "As it turned out, if you took the fantasy to where they were battling skeletons, that made total sense for the kids. We could push it one step further - it's fine that these skeletons have these skeleton themed monster trucks and stuff like that. At that point, you could really start to see a product assortment".

Writers Dan and Kevin Hageman came up with the initial idea for the ninjas' distinctive flying base, The Destiny's Bounty. Their idea was that it would be a "windmill that turned into a helicopter and flew around". However, the idea to use a junk ship for the ninja base was suggested by Tommy Andreasen. The vessel has changed design over time both in the series and in toy form. Design Manager Michael Svane Knap commented, "One of the approaches that we have is that you need to try and boil it down to what makes an icon. What is the detail that means this is the Bounty? We are not confined in the same way as Star Wars, where it needs to be a Millennium Falcon that can only look one way."

=== Branding ===
The brand name "Ninjago" is a combination the words "ninja" and "Lego". Andreasen noted that this fell into place naturally, saying "It's universally recognised, it works in any language and it has a good dynamic to it. It's short and to the point. We added Masters of Spinjitzu to it just for flavor".

=== Fictional language ===
The Lego Ninjago universe incorporates a fictional written language known as Ninjargan that has been displayed on numerous occasions in both the Ninjago television series and in the Lego Ninjago construction sets. The written language uses a unique alphabet of symbols that resemble the visual style of Chinese characters. The characters can be deciphered to translate the words that are commonly displayed on signs and advertisements in the Ninjago universe. With the release of The Lego Ninjago Movie, a Ninjago Language Translator was released to accompany the film. In April 2020, the lead writer of the Ninjago television series, Bragi Schut stated on Twitter that the language is called "Ninjargon".

== Launch and success ==
Lego Ninjago was developed as a Big Bang project with a goal to double the sales of the previous Big Bang product line, Lego Atlantis. The design team set a target for the Ninjago line to deliver 10% of the company's total revenue. This was particularly ambitious, as no Lego theme had ever achieved this target, not even the successful Bionicle theme. By late April 2009, a full range of Ninjago products had been defined, which totalled 17 sets in the first year of its release. Alongside the Lego Ninjago product line, a variety of other media was created, including a Ninjago board game for Lego Games, a themed world for Lego Universe, a video game with TT Games that launched in April 2011, and the development of the animated Ninjago: Masters of Spinjitzu TV series that launched in January 2011. The launch of the TV show and the overwhelming popularity of the theme resulted in a 20% increase in sales in the first quarter of 2011, with the Ninjago line making the highest single-year sales for any Lego original product line in the company's history.

With its initial launch in early 2011, the Ninjago line was intended to continue for a limited run of three years. However, the strong sales performance of the line combined with the company's increased engagement with online communities resulted in The Lego Group reversing this decision. The company had begun to use online forums, such as Lego Cuusoo, to engage with fans and obtain customer feedback relating to its product range. The Ninjago brand was consequently extended past the end of 2013 and has been in production ever since.

In February 2021, Design Manager Michael Svane Knap commented on the ongoing appeal of the theme by stating, "When Lego Ninjago was originally created more than 10 years ago, it was as much luck as it was skill that made us get to where we are today. Everyone involved back then was quite new and inexperienced with creating a franchise. However, everyone involved pushed 110% to make it work and really brought their A-game. Throughout the years, the Ninjago theme has managed to stay relevant with its changing stories. It's kept kids engaged in the universe… The changing story has allowed us to bring variety to the team. We've taken the ninja through everything from battling snakes, robots, sky-pirates, biker gangs and samurai."

== Television series ==
Series	Seasons	Episodes	First released	Last released	Network(s)
Ninjago	15	210	14 January 2011	1 October 2022	Cartoon Network (2011–2020); Netflix (2021–2022)
Ninjago: Dragons Rising	4	80	1 June 2023	3 September 2026	Netflix
Ninjago: Dragons' Fury	1	20	2027		Netflix

From its launch, the Lego Ninjago product line was based on the animated Ninjago television series (originally titled Ninjago: Masters of Spinjitzu). The series was created by Michael Hegner and Tommy Andreasen. Ninjago: Masters of Spinjitzu was animated in Denmark by Wil Film ApS for the first ten seasons. The production was relocated to WildBrain Studios in Canada for the eleventh season and the series was retitled Ninjago. Regular seasons of the show were released each year from 2011 to 2022, along with one pilot season and one extended special. In 2022, a new series for the brand was announced at San Diego Comic-Con. The new series titled Ninjago: Dragons Rising was revealed in a campaign to find and merge five scattered poster fragments. It was released on 1 June 2023 on Netflix.

The series and the product line were created to coexist, with the storyline and products running alongside one another. This close connection is created out of a collaboration between product designers and storywriters. Design Manager Michael Svane Knap has elaborated on this by stating, "The product is important to us, but it's as important that we tell an engaging story from the beginning. We start developing with a lot of concept boards, so we know where we want to go...Often the writers also come up with new characters or new plot developments that we can then integrate into the products where possible. Both story and product are really tight together".

== Main characters ==
=== Original Ninjago characters ===
Left to right: Kai, Cole, Zane, Master Wu, Nya, Jay, Lloyd

The original characters within the Ninjago television series were a team of six teenage ninja who are "Elemental Masters" and trained in the art of Spinjitzu by their teacher, Master Wu.

- Lloyd Garmadon – The legendary Green Ninja, Elemental Master of Life and the son of Lord Garmadon and Misako.
- Kai – The red ninja, Elemental Master of Fire and older brother of Nya.
- Jay Walker – The blue ninja, Elemental Master of Lightning and boyfriend of Nya.
- Zane Julien – The white/titanium ninja, Elemental Master of Ice, "nindroid" (android) and boyfriend of P.I.X.A.L.
- Cole – The black ninja and Elemental Master of Earth.
- Nya – The grey/blue ninja, Elemental Master of Water, former Samurai X, younger sister of Kai and girlfriend of Jay.
- Lord Garmadon – The Master of Destruction, older brother of Master Wu and father to Lloyd.
- Master Wu – The Master of Creation, wise sensei of the Ninja and younger brother of Lord Garmadon.

=== Ninjago: Dragons Rising characters ===
In 2023, the Ninjago: Dragons Rising series came out and introduced new main characters.

- Arin Nived– a young citizen born in Ninjago, who taught himself Spinjitzu
- Sora – an engineer who defects from Imperium and elemental master of Technology
- Riyu – a new source dragon capable of awakening elemental powers
- Wyldfyre – a human raised by a dragon and the elemental master of Heat
- Frak — a Serpentine, a humanoid-snake hybrid race, best friends with Arin and elemental master of Quake
- Euphrasia — a young cloud monk from the Cloud Kingdom and new elemental master of Wind

== Construction toys ==
=== Spinners ===
The Ninjago toy line began with the development of spinners, which were created as a way to introduce children to the wider theme. Senior Creative Manager, Tommy Andreasen explained, "We had the idea of the action toys. The challenge was how can you actually make a minifigure come to life and play fight with it? That's how the spinner came about. The first iterations of the spinner were actually built from Bionicle elements and looked more like a throwing star with a ninja on top". With the release of the Pilot Season of the Ninjago TV series in 2011, the first Ninjago spinner toys were launched. The spinners involve placing a Lego minifigure on either a spinning or flying disk. The first generation incorporated a two-player battle game involving exchanges of weapons and collectible cards. The second generation was released in 2015 and consisted of a ripcord mechanism to launch the spinner into the air, recreating the art of "Airjitzu" in the Ninjago TV series. The most recent release of Ninjago spinners was in March 2022.

=== Playsets ===
Since 2011, Lego Ninjago themed playsets have been released in waves each year to correspond with each season of the Ninjago television series. The playsets feature some of the main locations, vehicles, mechs, weapons and characters from the corresponding season. According to BrickLink, there have been 570 Lego Ninjago sets released since 2011. Each season has corresponding boxed sets, either released in one or two waves across a given year. Design Manager Michael Svane Knap commented on the design process stating, "In our development of the toys, we always start with the story. Our first priority is to tell a good story both in the physical products and in the content we’re creating. And the ninja is always the constant starting point of the concept… They each bring their own unique thing to the story and products.

In 2011, the Ninjago theme released 39 toy construction sets that were based on the Pilot Episodes. The product range included the spinner toys and skeleton-themed playsets, such as skull monster trucks, and vehicles, dragons and locations from the season, including Garmadon's Dark Fortress, Ice Dragon Attack and the Fire Temple.

In 2012, the Ninjago toy line was based on the first season titled Rise of the Snakes. It introduces Lloyd Garmadon and focuses on the snake-like Serpentine. The product line featured dragons and snake-themed vehicles from the season, including Fangpyre Truck Ambush, Epic Dragon Battle and Ultra Sonic Raider.

In 2013, Lego Ninjago was based on the second season Legacy of the Green Ninja, which focuses on Lloyd Garmadon becoming the "Golden Ninja". The toy line included The Golden Dragon set, which featured the character in his golden minifigure form and was later rereleased as part of the Ninjago Legacy line in 2019.

In 2014, the toy line was based on the third season, Rebooted. The season focuses on advanced technology and this was reflected in the nindroid-themed playsets, such as OverBorg Attack and Nindroid MechDragon. The toy line also included the Kai Fighter, Thunder Raider and X-1 Ninja Charger, which were all rereleased as part of the Ninjago Legacy line.

The year 2015 was the first year to feature two Ninjago seasons in one year, and the toy line released sets based on the fourth season titled Tournament of Elements and the fifth season titled Possession. The fourth season focuses on Master Chen and the snake-like Anacondrai and its associated toy range included locations and vehicles from the season, including Jungle Raider, ElectroMech and Enter the Serpent. The fifth season features an army of ghosts led by Morro, and the toy line included ghost-themed vehicles, dragons and locations from the season, including Final Flight of Destiny's Bounty and the Temple of Airjitzu.

In 2016, the Ninjago playsets were based on the sixth season titled Skybound and the 45-minute special Day of the Departed. The Skybound sets focused on Nadakhan and his band of sky pirates and included pirate-themed locations and vehicles from the season, such as Tiger Widow Island, Misfortune's Keep and The Lighthouse Siege. The Day of the Departed sets included the Ultra Stealth Raider, Samurai X Cave Chaos and Rock Roader.

In 2017, the Ninjago playsets were based on the seventh season titled Hands of Time, which focuses on time travel and the main antagonists Krux and Acronix. The playsets included vehicles and locations from the season, including Destiny's Shadow, Dragon Forge and Dawn of Iron Doom. A second wave for the year was replaced by The Lego Ninjago Movie toy line, which introduced new hair pieces for the ninja characters that were adopted and used in subsequent waves.

The eighth season, which was released in 2018 and titled Sons of Garmadon, focuses on a criminal biker gang and the associated sets included the vehicles and locations of the season, including Street Race of Snake Jaguar, Ninja Nightcrawler, S.O.G. Headquarters and the Temple of Resurrection. The ninth season Hunted focuses on a band of Dragon Hunters and was accompanied by a wave of playsets featuring dragons, including Firstbourne, Stormbringer and the Dragon Pit.

The tenth season March of the Oni focuses on an evil race named the Oni and was accompanied in 2019 by a minifigure pack of Oni villains.

In the second half of 2019, Secrets of the Forbidden Spinjitzu was released, which focuses on themes of fire and ice. The wave of sets included vehicles and locations from the season, including Fire Fang, Lloyd's Titan Mech, the Land Bounty and Castle of the Forsaken Emperor.

This was followed in 2020, by the release of two seasons titled Prime Empire and Master of the Mountain. Prime Empire's video game theme was reflected in its playsets, which included three arcade pods, dragons, vehicles and locations from the season, such as Jay's Cyber Dragon, Kai's Mech Jet and Empire Temple of Madness. Master of the Mountain focuses on the evil Skull Sorcerer and the dungeons of Shintaro and its associated wave of sets included Spinjitzu Burst spinners and several playsets that can be used as a role playing board game, including the Skull Sorcerer's Dungeons.

In 2021, Lego Ninjago released two waves based on The Island and Seabound. The first wave featured island-themed vehicles and locations from The Island such as Catamaran Sea Battle, Lloyd's Jungle Chopper Bike and The Keepers' Village. The second wave introduced the sea-themed vehicles and locations of Seabound, including Ninja Sub Speeder, the Hydro Bounty and Temple of the Endless Sea.

For the 2022 Spring range, the designer revealed the concept behind a wave of sets named Ninjago Core. Niek van Slagmaat explained, "We were asked to come up with a line of Ninjago that would not only stand on its own without content but also be the epitome of Ninjago toys" and continued, “After the specialized launches like Prime Empire and Seabound, the markets asked for a wave with the classic Ninjago identity. We would not get any story continuing content in order to make sure we could get started on 2HY 2022 as early as possible. Thus, Core was born." The wave comprised various playsets that feature in the corresponding Ninjago Core shorts, including Lloyd's Legendary Dragon, Jay's Thunder Dragon EVO, Kai's Fire Dragon EVO, Lloyd's Race Car EVO and Zane's Power Up Mech EVO. An additional four sets were released in March, consisting of Kai's Spinjitzu Ninja Training, Lloyd's Spinjitzu Ninja Training, Jay's Spinjitzu Ninja Training and Ninja Training Center. Nine new sets that correspond to the final season of the original series titled Crystalized were released in summer 2022. The sets are based on the season's storyline and include Nya's Samurai X Mech, The Crystal King and The Crystal King Temple.

In 2023, nine new sets were announced for release on 1 January 2023, including Kai's Ninja Race Car EVO, Lloyd's Mech Battle EVO, Cole's Earth Dragon EVO, Kai's Mech Rider EVO, Jay's Lightning Jet EVO, Jay's Titan Mech, Zane's Ice Dragon Creature, Creative Ninja Brick Box and Nya's Water Dragon EVO. In addition, fourteen sets based on new series titled Ninjago: Dragons Rising were announced for release in June 2023, including Kai's Dragon Power Spinjitzu Flip, Nya's Dragon Power Spinjitzu Drift, Lloyd's Dragon Power Spinjitzu Spin, Kai and Ras's Car and Bike Battle, Imperium Dragon Hunter Hound, Zane's Dragon Power Spinjitzu Race Car, Sora's Transforming Mech Bike Racer, Heatwave Transforming Lava Dragon, Lloyd and Arin Ninja Team Mechs, Temple of the Dragon Energy Cores, Elemental Dragon vs. Empress Mech, Destiny's Bounty: Race Against Time, Nya and Arin's Baby Dragon Battle and Ninjago City Market.

In 2024, nine new sets for the 1st half of the second season were announced for release on 1 January 2024, including Kai's Rising Dragon Strike, Nya's Rising Dragon Strike, Arin's Rising Dragon Strike, Arin's Battle Mech, Jay's Mech Battle Pack, Cole's Elemental Earth Mech, Sora's Elemental Tech Mech, Kai's Elemental Fire Mech and Egalt the Master Dragon. other seven new sets for the 1st half of the second season were announced for release on 1 March 2024 including Young Dragon Riyu, Arin's Ninja Off-Road Buggy Car, Kai's Ninja Climber Mech, Wolf Mask Shadow Dojo, Kai's Source Dragon Battle, Lloyd's Elemental Power Mech, Dragon Stone Shrine, six new sets for the 2nd half of the second season were announced for release on 1 August 2024 Tournament Temple City, Zane's Ice Motorcycle, Tournament Battle Arena, Ninja Team Combo Vehicle, Cole's Titan Dragon Mech, and Source Dragon of Motion.

=== Ninjago Legacy ===
In 2019, the Ninjago Legacy line was introduced as a sub-theme of the main Ninjago construction toy line, to celebrate the legacy of the theme over the course of almost ten years. Ninjago Legacy recreates earlier Ninjago playsets released in previous years with updated designs. The Ninjago Legacy line gave Ninjago fans the opportunity to revisit sets from previous years in relation to specific seasons. Senior Model Designer Michael Svane Knap justified the decision to recreate the original sets by stating, "When a lot of these sets originally came out, it was back in 2011 and 2012. The way we build with Lego bricks, the way we actually put sets together, has changed a lot. This means we have new elements; we have new ways of making the build even better." In 2019, the first Legacy wave reimagined previously released vehicles like Jay's Storm Fighter, Cole's Earth Driller, Kai's Blade Cycle & Zane's Snowmobil, and also included the Monastery of Spinjitzu. In 2020, the Legacy wave included the Golden Mech, which was based on Ninjago Season 2, Thunder Raider and Kai Fighter, which were based on Season 3, Jungle Raider, which was based on Season 4, and a reimagined Destiny's Bounty. In 2021, the Legacy wave included Overlord Dragon, which was based on Season 2, X-1 Ninja Charger, which was based on Season 3, Boulder Blaster, Jay's Electro Mech and Tournament of Elements, which were based on Season 4, Zane's Titan Mech Battle, which was based on Season 5, and Ultra Sonic Raider.

=== Tenth anniversary ===
On 14 January 2021, the Lego Ninjago brand celebrated its tenth anniversary. To mark this milestone, The Lego Group released a limited number of playsets in the Ninjago Legacy line that include exclusive collectible golden minifigures of the main ninja characters.

To celebrate the tenth anniversary, Ninjago City Gardens (set number: 71741) was released on 1 February 2021 as part of the Ninjago Legacy line. The set contains 5,685 pieces, surpassing the previously released Ninjago City set, making it the largest Ninjago set ever produced. It was designed to connect smoothly with the previous Ninjago modular sets. The playset, similar to the earlier Ninjago City set, is a high rise that contains multiple small shops, including Chen's Noodle House and Ice Planet. The set features two apartments, a tea balcony, "The Ninja Zone", a rooftop garden, the Ninjago Museum of History and a Ninja Control Tower. Additionally, a small temple island build attached to the set displays a statue of the character Zane. The set includes a "Golden Wu" which is part of the collection of collectible golden minifigures for the 2021 Ninjago wave.

The collection of Golden Legacy minifigures was completed with the release of the Summer 2021 Ninjago sets in June 2021, which include golden minifigures of the Ninjago characters Nya and Zane.

=== Juniors ===
Ninjago themed sets have also been produced as part of the Lego Juniors theme and, more recently, as part of its successor product range 4+. These sets were specifically designed to be simpler to build with fewer pieces and slightly larger building elements. The Ninjago 4+ sets are aimed at children aged four and above, such as Kai's Fire Dragon set, which is part of the Ninjago Legacy sub-theme.

=== BrickHeadz ===
Several Lego Ninjago characters have also been released as part of the Lego BrickHeadz theme. A range of 10th anniversary BrickHeadz was announced in May 2021, which included Golden Lloyd, Nya Samurai X, and Firstbourne Dragon as buildable characters.

== Film adaptations and toy line ==
On 17 September 2013, Warner Bros. announced that it was developing an animated film based on the Lego Ninjago theme. The Lego Ninjago Movie premiered on 16 September 2017 at the Regency Village Theatre in Los Angeles. To coincide with the release of the film, The Lego Group released The Lego Ninjago Movie toy line, which included 15 building sets and collectible minifigures based on the film. The largest sets in the line were Ninjago City (set number: 70620) and Ninjago City Docks (set number: 70657), with Ninjago City being listed as one of the largest Lego sets ever released. The line was eventually discontinued by 31 December 2019.

On 31 October 2024, it was announced that a live-action Ninjago film from Universal Pictures is in development, with Dan and Kevin Hageman attached to pen the script.

== Media franchise ==
Lego Ninjago
- Created by: Lego
- Original work: Ninjago
- Owner: The Lego Group
- Years: 2011–present

Films and television
- Films: The Lego Ninjago Movie (2017); Untitled live-action Lego Ninjago film (TBA)
- Animated series: Ninjago (2011–2022) Ninjago: Dragons Rising (2023–present)

Games
- Video game: Lego Ninjago (video game franchise)

Miscellaneous
- Theme park attractions: List of attractions

Official website
- Official website

Since its launch in 2011, The Lego Group has developed the Ninjago brand into a media franchise that has produced an extensive variety of media and merchandise, including books, magazines, video games and mobile app games, and theme park attractions.

=== Theme park attractions ===
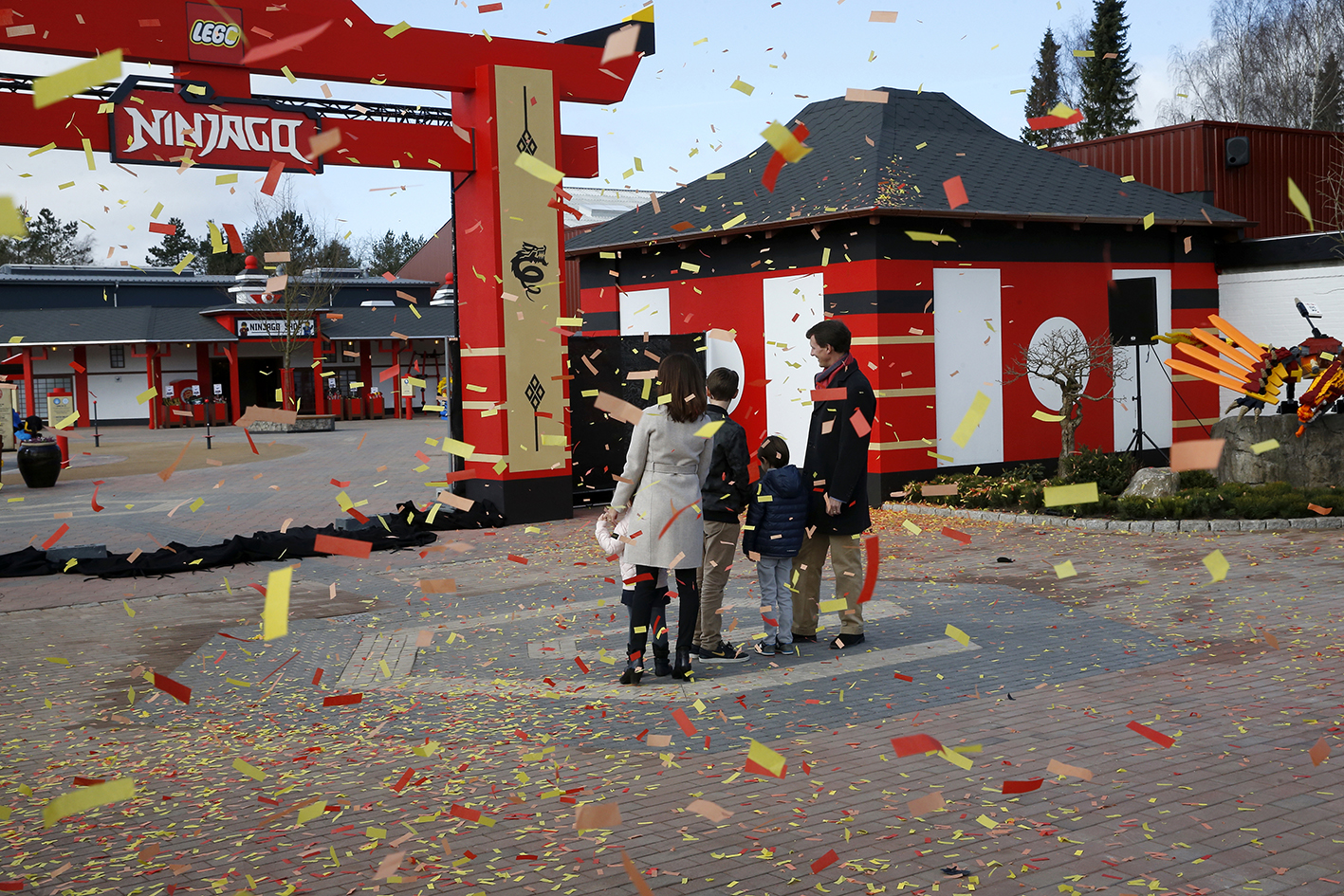
Princess Marie of Denmark and Prince Joachim of Denmark attending the opening of Lego Ninjago World at Legoland Billund

Several theme park attractions have been launched at Legoland resorts within Lego Ninjago World, a themed area of the parks. In September 2015, a puppet-style live show made its debut at Legoland Malaysia Resort, titled Lego Ninjago and The Realm of Shadows. This was followed by the introduction of Lego Ninjago: The Ride at the same park in June 2016, an interactive attraction manufactured by Triotech, which uses Maestro hand gesture technology in place of a hand-held device. In March 2016, Lego Ninjago World was launched at Legoland Billund Resort. A similar themed area was introduced at Legoland Deutschland Resort in April 2017. It was later launched in May 2017 at Legoland Windsor Resort. In the same month, it was introduced at Legoland California and Legoland Florida. Lego Ninjago: The Ride was introduced at Legoland Windsor Resort in 2017. Ninjago World at Legoland Windsor also includes a swinging boat ride designed to resemble Destiny's Bounty. In addition, several Ninjago-themed attractions at Legoland resorts were designed to test balance, agility, speed and creativity, including Zane's Temple Build, Kai's Spinners, Cole's Rock Climb and Jay's Lightning Drill. In 2018, Legoland California premiered a short 4D animated film attraction titled Lego Ninjago: Master of the 4th Dimension, which was then rolled out in Legoland parks and Legoland Discovery Centres in 2018. On 29 May 2021, Lego Ninjago World was introduced as one of seven themed lands with the opening of Legoland New York. In November 2021, a Lego Ninjago World themed land was announced for the upcoming launch of Legoland Shanghai Resort in 2024. In 2022, Lego Ninjago Weekends were launched on 11 June until 10 July 2022 at Legoland Windsor Resort.

=== Publications ===
A wide variety of books and magazines have been published based on the Ninjago characters, including children's story books, colouring books and activity books. From 2011, a series of children's reading books were published, written by Tracey West, which focus on the stories and characters of Ninjago. Several graphic novels have been written by Greg Farshtey, which provide stories based on the Ninjago characters. Regular editions of a Lego Ninjago Character Encyclopedia are published, which provide facts about the characters, minifigures, vehicles and locations from the Ninjago universe. The book has appeared in the top position on The New York Times Best Seller List. A long-running Lego Ninjago magazine is also published each month, which includes puzzles, activities and stories about the Ninjago characters. According to the Audit Bureau of Circulations (ABC), the Lego Ninjago magazine achieved an average circulation of 54,000 between July and December 2021, ahead of the Lego City magazine at 32,153 and the Lego Star Wars magazine at 45,133. In March 2021, Random House announced the publication of four titles based on the Ninjago brand, including a chapter book series, a guide book called The Book of Elemental Powers, and a hardcover book collection titled 5 Minute Stories. In September 2021, The Lego Group released a tenth anniversary box set that contains the 2017 book titled The Book of Spinjitzu, poster, stickers and golden Lloyd minifigure. In November 2021, a five-part comic book series for release in 2022 was announced for the Ninjago brand, starting with the first title LEGO Ninjago: Garmadon. In September 2021, the first two Lego Ninjago Spinjitzu Brothers books titled The Curse of the Cat-Eye Jewel and The Lair of Tanabrax were published by Penguin Random House. The Maze of the Sphinx was published on 3 May 2022 to continue the prequel story of Wu and Garmadon. The fourth book titled The Chroma’s Clutches was published on 6 September 2022.

=== Video games and apps ===
The characters from the Ninjago theme have appeared in a wide variety of video games and mobile apps. In the same year as its initial launch, the Ninjago brand was introduced into the gaming world with the development of a video game titled Lego Battles: Ninjago, which was released on 12 April 2011. It was produced by TT Games and developed by Hellbent Games. In the same year, a Ninjago themed world was introduced to the massively multiplayer online game Lego Universe on 20 September 2011. On 22 March 2012, an app developed by The Lego Group titled Rise of the Snakes was released for iOS. It was produced to accompany the first season of the television series titled Rise of the Snakes. On 21 January 2014, a game was released for iOS titled Lego Ninjago Rebooted, which was developed by The Lego Group. It is an action game that involves running and dodging obstacles while navigating a tower. On 29 July 2014, a video game titled Lego Ninjago: Nindroids was also released. The two games are based on the third season titled Rebooted. An action game titled Lego Ninjago: Tournament was released on 23 January 2015 for iOS, developed by The Lego Group, which was based on the fourth season titled Tournament of Elements. In the same year, another video game titled Lego Ninjago: Shadow of Ronin was released on 24 March 2015 set between the fourth season and Possession, the fifth season of the show, which was developed by TT Fusion. In 2016, the sixth season of the show titled Skybound was accompanied by the release of a web and app game titled Lego Ninjago: Skybound. It was developed by The Lego Group and is a side-scrolling platform game. To accompany the release of The Lego Ninjago Movie, an action-adventure video game titled The Lego Ninjago Movie Video Game was released in 2017 for Microsoft Windows, Nintendo Switch, PlayStation 4, and Xbox One. The game was released on 22 September 2017 and featured the characters and locations from the movie. On 26 April 2018, a mobile riding game titled Ride Ninja was released for Android and iOS to coincide with the eighth season of the show titled Sons of Garmadon. It was developed by Amuzo Games and published by The Lego Group.

The Ninjago characters have also made appearances in various other Lego games. On 27 September 2015, Lego Dimensions was released, which is a video game developed by Traveller's Tales and published by Warner Bros. Interactive Entertainment. The game offers an additional Ninjago Team Pack that includes figures and vehicles from Ninjago. The Lego-themed sandbox game, Lego Worlds also includes the Ninjago characters as playable characters. It was developed by Traveller's Tales, published by Warner Bros. Interactive Entertainment and released on 7 March 2017. The game offers downloadable content of the Ninjago characters and locations based on The Lego Ninjago Movie. On 19 September 2019, a mobile fighting game for iOS devices titled Lego Brawls was released, which was published by The Lego Group and developed by RED Games. The game includes playable Ninjago characters and Ninjago-themed events. In 2020, a role-playing battle game titled Lego Legacy: Heroes Unboxed was released on Apple's App Store, Google Play and Microsoft Store. It was published by The Lego Group and developed by Gameloft Toronto and features the Ninjago characters as playable minifigures.

=== Other media and merchandise ===
In 2015, the Lego Ninjago characters appeared in several videos on the Lego YouTube channel that recreate American Ninja Warrior in Lego form. The Ninjago characters are depicted taking part in several obstacles from the course, including the Warped Wall, Salmon Ladder and Spider Climb.

In 2019, The Lego Group partnered with Nickelodeon to become the global sponsor of the Kid's Choice Awards. The campaign featured stop-motion animated content that included the characters from the Ninjago TV series, which was released across television, digital and social media on 7 March 2019. The story involved Lord Garmadon plotting a mission to steal a slime cannon, resulting in the Lego Ninjago characters having to defeat him.

In May 2021, the Ninjago characters Jay and Nya appeared in Ninja Vlogs, 3D animated vlog-style videos, which were produced using motion capture and real-time rendering. The new content format allowed viewers to provide an input to the story and aimed to move beyond broadcasting to children to engaging them in conversation.

The Ninjago brand has also produced clothing and accessories for children and young adults, including collaborations with Adidas and Hype in 2021.

In 2022, the Lego Ninjago brand also produced a plush toy collection.

In December 2022, a Lego Ninjago Master Class web short was released on YouTube. It features Tommy Andreasen, Nikolaj Severin, Tommy Kalmar and Ina Sta. Maria teaching about drawing Ninjago minifigures.

In May 2023, a Lego Ninjago Dragons Rising We Rise an official music video was released on YouTube.

== Awards and nominations ==
In 2011, Fire Temple (set number 2507) was announced as one of the must-have "DreamToys" for Christmas in the Construction category by the Toy Retailers Association.

In 2012, Fire Temple was awarded "Activity Toy of the Year" for inspiring creative play through various forms of activity at the 12th Annual Toy of the Year Awards, which is held at the American International Toy Fair in New York City.

In 2013, the Ninjago theme was nominated for "Property of the Year" by the Toy Association.

In 2015, Master Wu Dragon (set number 70734) was a winner of "DreamToys" in the "Build It And They Will Thrive" category by the Toy Retailers Association.

== Reception ==
The Ninjago line is one of The Lego Group's most popular brands with young boys. In 2011, the Toy Retailers Association listed the Fire Temple set on its official list of 'dream toys' for the festive season, which predicted the 12 products that would be the bestsellers in that year. In September 2011, Marketing Week listed the first wave of Ninjago spinners as one of the top ten bestselling toys of the year. In 2012, toy retailer Toys "R" Us included the Ninjago Epic Dragon Battle set (9450) on its annual Hot Toy List, which it considered to be a cross-section of the best new toys of the season. In the same year, Ninjago ranked as one of the top five Lego properties of 2012, which together accounted for 50 per cent of all construction sets sold in the U.S. in that year. In 2014, the ninth volume in a series of Ninjago graphic novels by Greg Farshtey titled Night of the Nindroids entered The New York Times Graphic Novel Bestseller List at the top position, the eighth volume in a total of 12 to do so, and passed the mark of 2 million sales for the series. In 2015, the Ninjago line was listed as one of the top five bestselling themes in The Lego Group's Annual Report. In 2016, Toys "R" Us included the Ninjago Samurai X Cave Chaos set (70596) on its list of top toys for Christmas 2016. In the same year, Ninjago was listed as one of the top themes driving revenue in The Lego Group's 2016 Annual Report. Ninjago was also listed as one of the top selling themes in the 2017 Annual Report. The popularity of the Ninjago theme continued through to 2018, when it was named as one of the year's best selling themes, despite an overall fall in profits for the company in 2017. In September 2019, Ninjago was listed as one of the top selling themes driving revenue growth in the first half of 2019. Due to the long-term popularity and indefinite continuation of the Ninjago line, the brand is described as an annual evergreen Lego product range. Ernie Estrella for Syfy Wire commented that Lego Ninjago, "is one of Lego's long running, home-grown franchises, and is arguably its most successful one."

== See also ==
- Lloyd Garmadon
- Ninjago (TV series)
- List of Ninjago episodes
- List of Ninjago characters
- Lego Ninjago (video game franchise)
- The Lego Ninjago Movie
- The Lego Ninjago Movie (Lego theme)
- The Lego Ninjago Movie Video Game
- Legends of Chima
- Nexo Knights
- Lego Monkie Kid
- Lego Games
- Lego Dreamzzz
