= Hands of Time =

Hands of Time may refer to:

== Arts, entertainment and media ==
=== Gaming ===
- Hands of Time, a 2001 video game published by Titus Interactive for the Game Boy Color

=== Music ===
- Hands of Time (album), a 1991 album by Kingdom Come
- "Hands of Time" (song), a 2025 song by Eric Church
- "Hands of Time", a 2002 song by Groove Armada from Lovebox
- "Hands of Time", a 2009 song by Primal Fear from 16.6 (Before the Devil Knows You're Dead)
- "Hands of Time", a 2016 song by Margo Price from Midwest Farmer's Daughter
- "Hands of Time", a 2017 song by Firewind from Immortals
- "The Hands of Time", a song by Stratovarius from the 1992 album Twilight Time
- "The Hands of Time", theme from the film Brian's Song

=== Ninjago franchise ===
- Hands of Time (Ninjago), fictional characters
- Ninjago: Hands of Time, the seventh season in the Ninjago: Masters of Spinjitzu animated television series
- The Hands of Time (episode), an episode of Ninjago: Masters of Spinjitzu
- Hands of Time, an update to the Lego Ninjago: Wu-Cru video game
