= Lego Ninja =

Lego theme

- Parent theme: Lego Castle
- Subject: Ninja
- Availability: 1998–2000
- Total sets: 29

Lego Ninja is a discontinued Lego theme launched in 1998. It had many elements of the ninja warriors from feudal Japan. The majority of the sets were released in 1998 and 1999; however, three small sets of minifigures were released in 2000 as part of the "Mini Heroes Collection." After this, the theme was discontinued, and was effectively replaced by the "Knights Castle" theme in 2000.

== Background ==
The Ninja theme was released as a sub-theme of the Lego Castle theme, which from 1984 had started to develop into specific factions. Lego Ninja immediately followed the Fright Knights theme, which had been in production from 1997 to 1998. In contrast to Fright Knights, Lego Ninja took its influence from a more realistic starting point and was set in mountainous Japan with medieval buildings.

== Construction sets ==
A total of 29 toy sets were released as part of the Ninja theme, which centred on three distinctive groups; the ninja, the samurai and the robbers. The toy sets featured a variety of buildings and vehicles, including fortresses and boats. The ninja crest was yellow with a black wingless dragon. The Samurai had blue banners bearing a golden fan. The robber's crest was a red, black and silver bull's head. The ninja minifigures were designed in a variety of colours, including black, red, grey, green and white and featured grey shoulder plates. In contrast, the samurai were dressed in black, blue and silver, and the robbers were dressed in red and green.

Number	Name	Year	Pieces	Minifigs
1099	Ninja Blaster	1999	24	1
1184	Cart	1999	24	1
1185	Raft	1999	25	1
1186	Cart	1999	25	1
1187	Glider	1999	23	1
1269	White Ninja	1999	23	1
3016	Master and Heavy Gun	1998	24	1
3017	Ninpo Water Spider	1998	25	1
3018	LEGO Shogun Go!	1998	25	1
3019	Ninpo Big Bat	1998	23	1
3050	Shanghai Surprise	1999	104	3
3051	Blaze Attack	1999	145	2
3052	Ninja Fire Fortress	1999	169	3
3053	Emperor's Stronghold	1999	331	4
3074	Red Ninja's Dragon Glider	1999	20	1
3075	Ninja Master's Boat	1999	21	1
3076	White Ninja's Tank	1999	23	1
3077	Ninja Shogun's Mini Base	1999	22	1
3344	One Minifig Pack - Ninja #1	2000	9	1
3345	Three Minifig Pack - Ninja #2	2000	21	3
3346	Three Minifig Pack - Ninja #3	2000	22	3
4805	Ninja Knights	1999	31	5
6013	Samurai Swordsman	1998	13	1
6033	Treasure Transport	1998	54	3
6045	Ninja Surprise	1998	112	3
6083	Samurai Stronghold	1998	198	3
6088	Robber's Retreat	1998	277	4
6089	Stone Tower Bridge	1998	409	5
6093	Flying Ninja Fortress	1998	694	9

== Legacy ==
In 2010, Series 1 of the Lego Collectable Minifigures Series contained a ninja minifigure clearly based on the theme. A year later, in early 2011, Lego released the Lego Ninjago theme and associated television series Ninjago: Masters of Spinjitzu, which took heavy inspiration from the Ninja theme.
