= Ninjago: Sons of Garmadon =

Danish animated television season

- Season 8
- Sons of Garmadon poster
- Starring: Sam Vincent; Vincent Tong; Michael Adamthwaite; Brent Miller; Kirby Morrow; Kelly Metzger; Britt McKillip
- No. of episodes: 10

Release
- Original network: Cartoon Network
- Original release: April 16 – May 25, 2018

Season chronology
- ← Previous; Hands of Time Next → Hunted

Sons of Garmadon is the eighth season of the animated television series Ninjago: Masters of Spinjitzu (titled Ninjago from the eleventh season onward). The series was created by Michael Hegner and Tommy Andreasen. The season aired from April 16 to May 25, 2018, following the seventh season titled Hands of Time. It is succeeded by the ninth season titled Hunted.

The eighth season was the first season to be produced following the release of the 2017 film The Lego Ninjago Movie, which had significant impact on its development. The season adopted the new character designs from the movie, including face and hair alterations for the main ninja characters that differed significantly from the previous seasons. This was a particularly controversial move for existing fans of the show. The central character Lloyd Garmadon was given a new voice actor Sam Vincent, replacing Jillian Michaels.

The season introduces the character Princess Harumi as the season's main antagonist, who is revealed to be the leader of a criminal biker gang called the Sons of Garmadon. The storyline follows Harumi's plan to steal three Oni masks in order to resurrect Lord Garmadon in purely evil form as the season's overarching antagonist. The season also begins the Oni Trilogy story arc which would be continued in the next two seasons, Hunted and March of the Oni.

== Voice cast ==
=== Main ===
- Sam Vincent as Lloyd Garmadon, the Green Ninja and Master of Elemental Energy
- Vincent Tong as Kai, the Red Ninja and Elemental Master of Fire
- Michael Adamthwaite as Jay, the Blue Ninja and Elemental Master of Lightning
- Brent Miller as Zane, the Titanium Ninja and Elemental Master of Ice
- Kirby Morrow as Cole, the Black Ninja and Elemental Master of Earth
- Kelly Metzger as Nya, the Light Blue Ninja, Elemental Master of Water and Kai's sister
- Britt McKillip as Princess Harumi

=== Supporting ===
- Mark Oliver as Lord Garmadon
- Jennifer Hayward as P.I.X.A.L., a female nindroid
- Paul Dobson as Sensei Wu, the wise teacher of the ninja
- Caleb Skeris as Wu (baby)
- Kathleen Barr as Misako
- Alan Marriott as Dareth/Hutchins/The Mechanic
- Tabitha St. Germain as Mystake
- Michael Donovan as Samurai X/Police Commissioner
- Garry Chalk as Killow
- Maggie Blue O'Hara as Ultra Violet
- Ellen Kennedy as the Empress
- Richard Newman as the Emperor
- Brent Miller as Mr. E
- Michael Adamthwaite as Luke Cunningham
- Kelly Sheridan as Gayle Gossip

== Production ==
=== Character design ===
Sons of Garmadon was the first season to be produced following the release of the 2017 film The Lego Ninjago Movie, which was the third film in The Lego Movie franchise. The season title and opening scene were revealed at San Diego Comic-Con 2017. The eighth season adopted new designs for the main ninja characters that had appeared in the movie, including new hair and face designs. This was a particularly controversial change with existing fans of the show. As a result of the controversy, co-creator Tommy Andreasen released a statement on Twitter confirming that the eighth season was a continuation of the preceding storyline and stating, "Several characters like Zane and Cole have had major updates during the series' long run. Usually these changes happen within the episodes. This time however since time has passed since the end of Hands of Time, the changes are simply there. Where it may raise questions as you first encounter it, most of these changes will be touched upon in the episodes. The most notable change you have already seen on Lloyd. The other Ninja, though they may have some adjustments, will be using the original face rigs from the series and be voiced by the original voice cast, so rest assured that these are in fact the characters you know and love." Sons of Garmadon was also the first season in the series in which the character Lloyd Garmadon was voiced by Sam Vincent, replacing Jillian Michaels as voice actor.

=== Animation ===
The animation for the season continued at Wil Film ApS in Denmark. For the eighth season Wil Film made changes to their production pipeline to make visual improvements to the show.

=== Direction ===
Peter Hauser was the season director, with Louise Barkholt as producer.

=== Writing ===
The season was written by The Hageman Brothers, who were also the season's executive producers and the original writers from the beginning of the show.

=== Music ===
The season was scored by Jay Vincent and Michael Kramer.

== Release ==
The first trailer for the season was released on January 5, 2018 on the Lego YouTube channel. The season premiered on Cartoon Network on April 16, 2018 with the release of The Mask of Deception. The subsequent episodes were released throughout April and May 2018, with the season finale titled Big Trouble, Little Ninjago being released on May 25 of the same year.

== Plot ==
The Sons of Garmadon, a criminal biker gang, steals the Oni Mask of Vengeance. The ninja are summoned by the Royal Family, who ask them to protect the Oni Mask of Deception. There they meet Princess Harumi. (Note: Ninjago, Season 8, Episode 1 "The Mask of Deception") At night, Lloyd follows a figure out of the palace and discovers that it is Harumi. They hand out food to children and Lloyd develops feelings for the princess. The Sons of Garmadon attack the Royal Palace and Lloyd escapes with Harumi on a motorbike. They survive, but lose the Oni mask. (Note: Ninjago, Season 8, Episode 2 "The Jade Princess") Lloyd, Jay, Zane and Cole visit Mistaké's Tea Shop. She relates the "Tale of the Oni and the Dragon", while Cole and Zane head to the police station. Mistaké tells Lloyd that the Sons of Garmadon want to use the three Oni Masks to resurrect Lord Garmadon in a purely evil form. At the police station, Zane and Cole trick Luke Cunningham into revealing the hangout of the biker gang. They go to Laughy's in disguise, and when Cole's cover is blown he is taken prisoner, but Zane is recruited as "Snake Jaguar". (Note: Ninjago, Season 8, Episode 3 "The Oni and the Dragon") They force Zane to take part in a motorbike race, but a phone call from "The Quiet One", the gang's leader, reveals that Zane is a spy. Zane is forced to fight Mr. E, who reveals himself to be a Nindroid, knocks Zane off a cliff, and nearly destroys him. Cole escapes from his cell at the gang's base and finds a baby, who he takes with him. (Note: Ninjago, Season 8, Episode 4 "Snake Jaguar")

The ninja find Zane and reboot his systems, unaware that Mr. E has planted a mechanical spider on him that sabotages the Bounty and P.I.X.A.L. While caring for the baby, the ninja discover the location of the Mask of Hatred. When the Samurai Mech captures Harumi, Lloyd jumps onto it and they plummet to the ground. Nya uses rain to slow the descent of the Bounty and they crash into the jungle. (Note: Ninjago, Season 8, Episode 5 "Dead Man's Squall") The ninja notice that the baby is now a toddler and realise that he is Wu. P.I.X.A.L. discovers that the signal from The Quiet One came from the Bounty, proving that the leader is Harumi. (Note: Ninjago, Season 8, Episode 6 "The Quiet One") The ninja are captured by the Sons of Garmadon, while Lloyd and Harumi locate the Oni Temple. Lloyd realises that Harumi is The Quiet One and they fight over the mask, but Harumi escapes. The Sons of Garmadon leave with the three Oni Masks and Destiny's Bounty. (Note: Ninjago, Season 8, Episode 7 "Game of Masks")

The Sons of Garmadon take Lloyd and Misako to the Temple of Resurrection and lock them in cells. Harumi performs the ritual that resurrects Lord Garmadon. The ninja manage to stop the ritual and the police arrest the gang. Back at the temple, it is revealed that the ritual did in fact work and Garmadon is resurrected. (Note: Ninjago, Season 8, Episode 8 "Dread on Arrival") He frees Harumi and they go to Kryptarium Prison to release the prisoners. Lloyd confronts his father alone and they engage in a brutal fight which nearly kills Lloyd. (Note: Ninjago, Season 8, Episode 9 "True Potential") Garmadon conquers Ninjago by creating a stone Colossus. Lloyd wakes up and discovers that his elemental powers have gone. He takes Wu and flees with Harumi in pursuit. Lloyd throws Wu to the ninja on board Destiny's Bounty, but it is too far for him to jump. The Colossus grabs the Bounty and crushes it, but before it is destroyed, the ninja use Traveller's Tea to escape, and they find themselves in the Realm of Oni and Dragons. Lloyd and Nya mourn their loss and go into hiding, unaware that the others have survived. (Note: Ninjago, Season 8, Episode 10 "Big Trouble, Little Ninjago")

== Episodes ==
No. overall	No. in season	Title	Directed by	Written by	Story by	Original release date	U.S. viewers (millions)
75	1	"The Mask of Deception"	Peter Hausner	The Hageman Brothers & Bragi Schut	The Hageman Brothers	April 16, 2018	0.50
A year has passed since Master Wu was lost in time and the ninja are spread across Ninjago but regroup when a powerful relic is stolen by a group of masked criminals called the Sons of Garmadon. Lloyd finds that the group has something to do with his father, Lord Garmadon. Learning about the importance of the stolen 'Oni Mask' they are asked to protect the Royal Family and their Oni Mask from the Sons of Garmadon.
76	2	"The Jade Princess"	Jens Møller	The Hageman Brothers & Bragi Schut	The Hageman Brothers	April 23, 2018	0.46
Lloyd and Princess Harumi venture through the streets of Ninjago City. Meanwhile, Cole finds out the Palace has been rigged with bombs. Just then, the Sons of Garmadon, led by Ultra Violet and the mysterious Mr. E, attack the Palace to steal the Oni Mask. Hutchins helps Lloyd and Harumi escape with the mask through a secret tunnel, but remains behind. Lloyd and Harumi flee but are attacked by the Sons of Garmadon, who manage to steal the Oni Mask. Returning to the Destiny's Bounty, Lloyd and Harumi reunite with the other Ninja, who reveal to them that they are the only ones who managed to escape from the Palace's destruction.
77	3	"The Oni and the Dragon"	Trylle Vilstrup	The Hageman Brothers & Bragi Schut	The Hageman Brothers	April 30, 2018	0.53
The Ninja allow Harumi to live with them on the Bounty. Lloyd and Jay are told by Mistake of the tale of The Realm of Oni and Dragons and that the Sons of Garmadon plan to use the Oni Masks to resurrect Lord Garmadon. Meanwhile, Cole and Zane manage to get Luke Cunningham to tell them the location of the Sons of Garmadon's hangout. They disguise themselves but Cole's cover is blown and he is captured, while Zane maintains his cover as "Snake Jaguar" and earns Ultra Violet's and Mr. E's trust, prompting them to bring him to the "Big Man".
78	4	"Snake Jaguar"	Michael Helmuth Hansen	The Hageman Brothers	The Hageman Brothers	May 7, 2018	0.58
Zane, undercover as "Snake Jaguar", is brought into the Sons of Garmadon's hideout in the subway, where he meets Killow, the "Big Man", who is responsible with accepting new members and who challenges Zane to a bike race. Before the race, Zane meets Cole in a cell and learns that the leader of the Sons of Garmadon is named "The Quiet One". Cole escapes with a baby believed to be the "key" to the final Oni Mask. The race starts, but Killow is called by Ultra Violet, who tells him that Snake Jaguar is a Ninja. The Sons of Garmadon attack Zane. Mr. E runs after Zane and as they approach a cliff, they jump off their bikes. Much to Zane's surprise, Mr. E is then revealed to be a Nindroid.
79	5	"Dead Man's Squall"	Frederik Budolph	Bragi Schut	The Hageman Brothers	May 14, 2018	0.48
After a battle with Mr. E, Zane is severely injured and left in the desert until the ninja find him. While looking after the baby Cole found, they discover his blanket is a map to the Primeval's Eye, where the Oni Mask might be located. Meanwhile, a device Mr. E placed inside Zane makes its way to the power supply, cutting down the power in the entire ship. P.I.X.A.L. reveals herself to be Samurai X just before her hacked mech attacks. She ejects herself from it, causing it to fall off the ship, but Lloyd and Harumi fall off as well, using the map as a parachute. Meanwhile, Zane wakes up and destroys the spider, but the Bounty crashes into the jungle. Lloyd and Harumi venture into the Primeval's Eye to find the final Oni Mask.
80	6	"The Quiet One"	Jens Møller	Bragi Schut	The Hageman Brothers	May 21, 2018	0.45
While Lloyd and Harumi venture deep into Primeval's Eye, the other Ninja attempt to fix the Bounty and discover that the baby is Wu, who is recovering from the power of the Reversal Time-Blade. Also, while attempting to reboot in, they discover that the Quiet One is Harumi, but are stopped by the attack of the Sons of Garmadon. Meanwhile, Harumi and Lloyd find a boat and use it to travel along a river, but are attacked by a giant underwater creature, which wrecks the boat. They manage to escape from the monster and fall down the waterfall, where they find the Oni Temple.
81	7	"Game of Masks"	Trylle Vilstrup	The Hageman Brothers	The Hageman Brothers	May 22, 2018	0.58
Flashbacks reveal that Harumi swore vengeance against the Ninja after her birth parents died in the Great Devourer's attack. In the present, Lloyd and Harumi enter the Oni Temple and, after passing by some paintings depicting the Oni and traps, the two eventually find the Oni Mask. However, after Harumi tells Lloyd to pick it up, he realizes that she is The Quiet One. He eventually defeats Harumi in battle, but she grabs the Oni Mask and uses it to defeat Lloyd, before leaving the temple. Meanwhile, the Ninja have been tied up by the Sons of Garmadon, who have taken over the Bounty and use it to arrive at the Oni Temple, but they manage to break free. As the Ninja and the Sons of Garmadon prepare to fight, they are attacked by the underwater monster. The Sons of Garmadon escape aboard the Bounty with all Oni Masks and Lloyd, while the other Ninja are left to deal with the monster.
82	8	"Dread on Arrival"	Michael Helmuth Hansen	The Hageman Brothers & Bragi Schut	The Hageman Brothers	May 23, 2018	0.39
The Ninja return to Ninjago and arrive at the Police Station to ask for help in stopping the Sons of Garmadon's plan. Meanwhile, the Sons of Garmadon bring Lloyd to the Temple of Resurrection, where the ceremony to resurrect Garmadon will take place. Harumi reveals that she captured Lloyd's mother, Misako, as she needs them both in order to resurrect Garmadon. At nightfall, the Ninja sneak inside the temple, while Harumi opens a portal to the Departed Realm and summons Lord Garmadon. The Ninja manage to use Spinjitzu to close the portal and defeat the Sons of Garmadon. However, the ceremony has been completed, allowing Garmadon to return to Ninjago. Note: Harumi's look is changed in this episode
83	9	"True Potential"	Jens Møller	The Hageman Brothers & Bragi Schut	The Hageman Brothers	May 24, 2018	0.57
Lord Garmadon returns to Ninjago and releases all the imprisoned Sons of Garmadon and Harumi encourages him to "achieve his true potential" by conquering his son. The Ninja find out Garmadon has taken over Kryptarium prison and head there to confront him, but Lloyd, believing he is destined to fight his father alone, locks the other Ninja on the Bounty. Arriving at the prison, Lloyd confronts his father and the two battle, while the Sons of Garmadon broadcast everything in front of all the people of Ninjago. After throwing Lloyd out of the prison, Garmadon unlocks his True Potential and leaves to take over Ninjago City.
84	10	"Big Trouble, Little Ninjago"	Trylle Vilstrup	The Hageman Brothers	The Hageman Brothers	May 25, 2018	0.55
The Ninja find Lloyd and manage to save him, at the cost of his elemental powers. Garmadon arrives in Ninjago City and four of the ninja receive a package from Mistaké and leave to fight a stone giant Garmadon built, Colossus. Lloyd runs away with Wu but runs into Harumi. The other ninja make it to the Bounty and arrive in time to rescue Wu but not Lloyd, who is captured by Harumi. Colossus shows up and crushes the Bounty, while Harumi forces Lloyd to watch, but the four Ninja use the package, discovering it to be Traveller's Tea and find themselves in the Realm of Oni and Dragons.

== Ratings ==
The season premier of Sons of Garmadon aired on April 16, 2018 and achieved a position of 109 in the Top 150 Original Cable Telecasts with 0.50 million viewers.

== Other media ==
The season was accompanied by a related riding game titled Lego Ninjago: Ride Ninja, which was released for Android and iOS. It was developed by Amuzo Games and published by The Lego Group.

== See also ==
- List of Ninjago characters
- Lego Ninjago (video game franchise)
