= Ninjago: Hands of Time =

Danish animated television season

- Season 7
- Hands of Time poster
- Starring: Jillian Michaels; Vincent Tong; Michael Adamthwaite; Brent Miller; Kirby Morrow; Kelly Metzger; Paul Dobson; Michael Daingerfield; Ian Hanlin
- No. of episodes: 10

Release
- Original network: Cartoon Network
- Original release: May 15 – May 26, 2017

Season chronology
- ← Previous; Day of the Departed Next → Sons of Garmadon

Hands of Time (sometimes referred to as The Hands of Time) is the seventh season of the animated television series Ninjago: Masters of Spinjitzu (titled Ninjago from the eleventh season onward). The series was created by Michael Hegner and Tommy Andreasen. The season aired from May 15 to May 26, 2017, following the television special titled Day of the Departed. It is succeeded by the eighth season titled Sons of Garmadon. Hands of Time was the only season released in 2017 and was the last season to be produced before the release of The Lego Ninjago Movie.

The season introduces the two main antagonists called the "Hands of Time" (also known as the "Time Twins"), two brothers who are Elemental Masters and have the ability to control time. The storyline follows the Hands of Time as they retrieve four time blades scattered across Ninjago and involves the main ninja characters Kai and Nya following the Time Twins back through time.

== Voice cast ==
=== Main ===
- Jillian Michaels as Lloyd Garmadon, the Green Ninja and Elemental Master of Energy
- Vincent Tong as Kai, the Red Ninja and Elemental Master of Fire
- Michael Adamthwaite as Jay, the Blue Ninja and Elemental Master of Lightning
- Brent Miller as Zane, the Titanium Ninja and Elemental Master of Ice
- Kirby Morrow as Cole, the Black Ninja and Elemental Master of Earth
- Kelly Metzger as Nya, The Light Blue Ninja, Master Elemental of Water and Kai's younger sister
- Paul Dobson as Sensei Wu, the wise teacher of the ninja
- Michael Daingerfield as Krux/Dr. Saunders
- Ian Hanlin as Acronix

=== Supporting ===
- Jennifer Hayward as P.I.X.A.L., a female nindroid
- Kathleen Barr as Misako/Machia
- Lee Tockar as Cyrus Borg
- Brian Dobson as Ronin
- Alan Marriott as Dareth
- Vincent Tong as Ray
- Jillian Michaels as Maya

== Release ==
On December 19, 2016, a 1-minute trailer to promote the season was released on the Lego YouTube channel. The season premiered on Cartoon Network on May 15, 2017 with the release of the first episode titled The Hands of Time. The subsequent episodes were released throughout May 2017 until the release of the season finale titled Lost in Time on May 26 of the same year.

== Plot ==
Acronix emerges from the time vortex after being trapped for 40 years and Master Wu challenges him in combat. During the fight, the Forward Time Blade arrives through the vortex and Acronix uses it to hit Wu with a time punch that accelerates his aging. Acronix reunites with his brother Krux. Wu relates the history of the Hands of Time, twin brothers, who were once allied with the Elemental Masters, but betrayed them. Ray and Maya had forged four Time Blades, which Wu and Garmadon used to absorb the twins' elemental powers, before banishing them into the vortex. Krux had emerged from the vortex years ago and disguised himself as Dr. Sander Saunders, curator of the Ninjago History Museum. (Note: Ninjago, Season 7, Episode 1 "The Hands of Time")

The Hands of Time proceed with their master plan. Krux has bred an army of Vermillion warriors formed from snakes. The twins abduct Cyrus Borg and various workers from Ninjago City to build the Iron Doom, a time-traveling mech. The ninja attempt to fight the Vermillion but discover that they can immediately reform upon defeat. (Note: Ninjago, Season 7, Episode 2 "The Hatching") Kai visits Ninjago History Museum and fights the Time Twins with Nya. Krux tells Kai that his parents were traitors and helped the Hands of Time forge the Vermillion armour. (Note: Ninjago, Season 7, Episode 3 "A Time of Traitors") The Vermillion recover the Slow-Mo Time Blade from the desert, but the ninja take it from them. (Note: Ninjago, Season 7, Episode 5 "A Line in the Sand") The Vermillion then launch an attack on the Temple of Airjitzu and during the battle, the Hands of Time escape with both Time Blades and Wu as their captive. (Note: Ninjago, Season 7, Episode 6 "The Attack") They retrieve the Pause Time Blade from the top of a mountain.

The ninja split up to rescue Cyrus, the workers, and Wu. Kai visits the Blacksmith Shop and confronts his father, calling him a traitor. His parents explain that they were forced to work for Krux and that 40 years prior they hid the Reversal Time Blade in a secret location. The Hands of Time force Kai and Nya to retrieve the Reversal Blade from the Boiling Sea. (Note: Ninjago, Season 7, Episode 8 "Pause and Effect") They travel to its location by creating a Fusion Dragon, but on their return are attacked by Krux and Acronix, resulting in Ray being hit by the Forward Time Blade, which rapidly advances his age. (Note: Ninjago, Season 7, Episode 9 "Out of the Fire and Into the Boiling Sea")

The Hands of Time travel back 40 years to the same temporal point when they battled the Elemental Masters. The Vermillion warriors attack the monastery, but Kai, Nya, and Wu, who have followed them into the vortex, join the fight and the Elemental Masters get the upper hand. During the battle, the Time Twins alter history by forcing Wu to yield and this reverts present-day Ninjago to its pre-technology age. Kai and Nya ride the Fusion Dragon to battle the Iron Doom. The Hands of Time open another time vortex to escape, but Kai, Nya, and Wu confront them. During the fight, Wu rips out the Reversal Blade, sabotaging the Iron Doom in the process. Kai and Nya are thrown off the mech with the Reversal Blade and return to the present day. Ninjago is restored to its technological glory and Kai uses the Reversal Time Blade to cure his father's rapid aging. The Time Twins and Wu are lost in time aboard the Iron Doom and Lloyd gets declared as the new master. (Note: Ninjago, Season 7, Episode 10 "Lost in Time")

== Episodes ==
No. overall	No. in season	Title	Directed by	Written by	Original release date	U.S. viewers (millions)
65	1	"The Hands of Time"	Michael Helmuth Hansen	David Shayne	May 15, 2017	0.73
At the ruins of the Monastery of Spinjitzu, a strange vortex opens up to admit a mysterious hooded warrior who is then confronted by Master Wu; the pair recognize each other and Wu reveals that it has been forty years since he last encountered his enemy. Elsewhere, Misako is unloading supplies at the Temple of Airjitzu with the assistance of Ronin and of Dareth, while the Ninja are helping Dr. Saunders at the museum. While there, Kai and Nya find a portrait of their long-missing parents, Ray and Maya, and the Ninja also discover a portrait of a battle between Wu and Garmadon and the "mythical" Hands of Time, Acronix and Krux. Acronix, who happens to be Wu's mysterious enemy, is defeated but then restarts the battle after a Time Blade emerges from the vortex, causing a temporal wave that draws the Ninja to the monastery after Acronix strikes Wu with the weapon. During the ensuing battle, Acronix reveals that he knew Kai and Nya's father and then escapes after faking his own demise. He then meets up with Dr. Saunders, who is revealed to be none other than Krux.
66	2	"The Hatching"	Trylle Vilstrup	David Shayne	May 16, 2017	0.71
Wu, still recovering from his battle with Acronix, reveals to the Ninja that the Hands of Time were once Elemental Masters of Time who turned on their comrades after the Serpentine Wars. After a series of battles, their powers were drained into the four Time Blades, which were then sent into the time vortex and followed by Acronix and Krux themselves. Believing both to have been destroyed, the Ninja set to work unpacking their belongings into the Temple of Airjitzu, with Nya expressing some regret over leaving behind her Samurai X costume. Meanwhile, the reunited Acronix and Krux embark on their plan to conquer Ninjago, which involves unleashing the Vermillion warriors, humanoid warriors made up of snakes, joined together in suits of armor. One is sent to abduct Cyrus Borg at his new product launch, and two more are unleashed when the Ninja arrive to save him, with Acronix and Krux abducting Borg after Zane tries to take him to safety. The Vermillion keep the other Ninja occupied.
67	3	"A Time of Traitors"	Peter Hausner	John Behnke	May 17, 2017	0.77
Acronix and Krux unleash more Vermillion, including the three commanders, General Machia, Blunck, and Raggmunk, and task them to kidnap various craftspeople from around the city. The Ninja split up in an effort to determine the source of this new menace. Cole, Jay, and Nya take the inactive Zane back to the Samurai X Cave for repairs, and soon discover that Acronix is still alive and in league with Dr. Saunders. Kai makes the same discovery after visiting Saunders at the museum with a piece of Vermillion Tribe armor, as well as learning that Saunders is Krux. The villain also claims that Kai's parents sided with him and Acronix during their conflict with the Elemental Masters. Nya arrives to back Kai up against the Time Twins, but the villains escape with Cyrus Borg using the Time Blade Acronix used against Wu.
68	4	"Scavengers"	Michael Helmuth Hansen	Jack Thomas	May 18, 2017	0.77
Wu confesses to Misako that Acronix's attack has accelerated his aging process, and tells her to keep it secret, while Nya continues her attempts to repair Zane, frustrating P.I.X.A.L. with her lack of progress. With Wu out of action Lloyd tries to rally the Ninja, while Kai continues to struggle with Krux's claim that his parents were traitors. The Vermillion raid Ninjago city in search of metal, and Kai takes Cole and Jay off to confront them in defiance of Lloyd's orders and are joined by Ronin, Dareth, Nya, and a still malfunctioning Zane. In an effort to prevent their interference, General Machia sends a group of Vermillion to cut power to Ninjago City. The Ninja, joined by Lloyd after a talk with Wu restore power, and head to Mega Monster Amusement Park to confront the Vermillion. A repaired Zane notices with concern that P.I.X.A.L. is not responding.
69	5	"A Line in the Sand"	Trylle Vilstrup	Adam Beechen	May 19, 2017	0.77
While the rest of the Ninja face off with the Vermillion at the amusement park, Jay goes to the aid of his parents as their scrapyard is also invaded. The arrival of a second Time Blade changes things, with the Vermillion being directed to retrieve it after the technology loving Acronix pinpoints its location using his new Borg Watch, to the annoyance of his brother, Krux who hates technology. Two groups of Vermillion Warriors set out, with the scrapyard group, who also abducted Jay's mother and stole a large supply of metal, reaching the Time Blade first. Its powers allow them to hold the Ninja at bay until Jay arrives on his new bike, which he and his father built. The Ninja succeed in recovering the blade and escaping, but Machia and the Hands of Time are determined to take it back.
70	6	"The Attack"	Peter Hausner	Ryan Levin	May 22, 2017	0.71
Having returned to the Temple of Airjitzu, Jay, Cole, and Zane are letting their success in retrieving the second Time Blade go to their heads. While Lloyd fears reprisal from the Time Twins, Kai mulls over the supposed treachery of his parents, and Nya continues to wonder about her missing Samurai X gear. Wu recognizes the symbol branded in a previously retrieved helmet of a Vermillion Warrior, but before he can elaborate, the Temple is attacked. As his teammates engage the Vermillion, Lloyd joins the battle using his elemental dragon, only for it to dissipate due to his fear. He is unexpectedly saved by the Samurai X Mech, previously thought stolen by the Vermillion. Both the mech and the Destiny's Bounty are shot down, and the Hands of Time succeed in capturing the Time Blade and abducting Wu.
71	7	"Secrets Discovered"	Michael Helmuth Hansen	Jack Thomas	May 23, 2017	0.93
With the Bounty wrecked, the Ninja are forced to take separate vehicles as they set out to locate Wu and their enemies. Misako also reveals that Wu is rapidly aging, and Kai realizes that the mark on the Vermillions' helmets is his father's blacksmith brand. He returns to their family shop and discovers a hidden chamber concealing a strange two-bladed dagger and evidence that his parents are alive, while Nya returns to the Samurai X Cave, where she finds the person who stole her armor. Though the thief doesn't reveal their identity and changes their voice to sound like different people, Nya is convinced by their conviction and skills (and the mistaken belief that the person is Skylor) to pass on the mantle of Samurai X to them. Meanwhile, the other four Ninja search the sewers of Ninjago for the Time Twins' lair after discovering their lab and encounter Skales, who reveals that the Vermillion are the progeny (offspring or children) of the Great Devourer.
72	8	"Pause and Effect"	Trylle Vilstrup	John Behnke	May 24, 2017	0.84
The reassembled Ninja team venture into the underground swamp where the Vermillion Warriors have been bred, in order to rescue Wu, Cyrus Borg, and the kidnapped workers. Kai is determined to track down and confront his father, Ray, while Zane, still struggling with P.I.X.A.L.'s absence, searches for Borg and Lloyd goes looking for Wu. While the Time Twins are busy retrieving the third Time Blade, Cole and Jay find the prisoners, including Karlof, Lou, and the Royal Blacksmiths. Lloyd finds Wu under guard by Raggmunk and Blunck, who are bemoaning Machia's recent promotion over them, but fails to rescue him. Kai confronts his father, believing him to be a traitor, only to be stopped by his mother and Nya. The siblings learn that Krux, after returning to Ninjago alone, forced their parents into aiding him against their will. It is soon revealed that the Time Twins' plan involves a weapon known as the Iron Doom, built using Ray's metalworking, and Borg's technology, that can use the power of the Time Blades to travel through time. Before they can act to stop it, the Time Twins and their forces return, and force Kai and Nya to help them to retrieve the final Time Blade from its hiding place.
73	9	"Out of the Fire and Into the Boiling Sea"	Peter Hausner	David Shayne	May 25, 2017	0.85
With no other hope of saving Wu, Kai and Nya are forced to enter the sunken library of Hono Mizu in the Boiling Sea, a volcanic region where their parents hid the Reversal Time Blade. Using their father's Dragon Blade, they combine their elements to form a Fusion Dragon and enter the dangerous environment, where they face numerous obstacles. Meanwhile, Lloyd and the others set out to rescue Cyrus Borg, who installed a self-destruct feature on the Iron Doom. In an ensuing battle with Blunck and Raggmunk's Vermillion warriors, the Ninja are joined by Samurai X, who hacked into Zane's sensors to track them down and also seeks to rescue Borg. Kai and Nya succeed in retrieving the blade, only to lose it to Acronix and Krux after Ray is struck with a Time Punch. Kai, Nya, their parents, and Wu are then left falling to their doom but are saved by the Fusion Dragon. The Time Twins return to their base, and after thwarting Borg's sabotage order all their forces into the Iron Doom, which then enters a temporal vortex with the Fusion Dragon in hot pursuit.
74	10	"Lost in Time"	Michael Helmuth Hansen	David Shayne	May 26, 2017	0.75
Left in the present, Maya and a rapidly aging Ray meet up with Borg, Samurai X, and the remaining Ninja while Kai, Nya and Wu have boarded the Iron Doom, which soon arrives in Ninjago's past just after the Time Twins' original defeat, and unleashes the Vermillion on the victorious Elemental Masters. Doing their best to mitigate any damage to the past without causing more, Kai and Nya impersonate their parents to join a young Wu and his allies in battle, but the Vermillion snakes to merge with Iron Doom itself, animating it, and allowing it to defeat the past Elemental Masters, resulting in a present where no technology exists. Kai and Nya form the Fusion Dragon once again to attack, but Kai is defeated after Nya leaves for unspecified reasons. The Hands of Time decide to depart for the distant future so that they won't have to continue dealing with their interference. Having found the Reversal Blade in the past, prior to it being hidden in the Boiling Sea, Nya uses it to restore Wu's health, and with Kai's help they use it to reverse time, enabling them to board the Iron Doom while leaving the Reversal Blade with young Wu. A battle aboard the Iron Doom ends with Wu removing the Reversal Blade, which sets the Iron Doom adrift in time, and giving it to Kai and Nya, who are then dropped in the present where they use it to save their father. With Wu having been lost in time, staying on board the Iron Doom to fight Krux and Acronix, Lloyd is declared the new master.

== Reception ==
=== Ratings ===
On May 15, 2017, the Hands of Time premier aired on Cartoon Network and achieved position 77 in the Top 150 Monday Original Cable Telecasts with 0.73 million viewers.

=== Critical reception ===
Reviewer Melissa Camacho for Common Sense Media gave Hands of Time a 3 out of 5 star rating and noted that the season has "lots of fantasy violence" and themes of "loyalty, teamwork, and sacrifice". The reviewer also commented, "This entertaining instalment of the popular action series continues to offer a well-developed story featuring the franchise's trademark lessons on patience, equality, and, above all, loyalty and teamwork." RJ Carter for Critical Blast gave the season a 4.5 out of 5 rating commenting, "For a season that's only ten episodes long, and with episodes that are barely 30 minutes, Lego Ninjago manages to pack in a ton of story that keeps you coming back show after show."
