= Ninjago: Hunted =

Danish animated television season

- Season 9
- Hunted poster
- Starring: Sam Vincent; Vincent Tong; Michael Adamthwaite; Brent Miller; Kirby Morrow; Kelly Metzger; Paul Dobson; Madyx Whiteway; Mark Oliver; Brian Drummond
- No. of episodes: 10

Release
- Original network: Cartoon Network
- Original release: August 11 – August 25, 2018

Season chronology
- ← Previous; Sons of Garmadon Next → March of the Oni

Hunted is the ninth season of the animated television series Ninjago: Masters of Spinjitzu (titled Ninjago from the eleventh season onward). The series was created by Michael Hegner and Tommy Andreasen. The season aired from August 11 to August 25, 2018, following the eighth season titled Sons of Garmadon. It is succeeded by the tenth season titled March of the Oni.

The ninth season is a direct continuation of the storyline from Sons of Garmadon, and introduces one of the 16 fictional realms in the Ninjago universe: the Realm of Oni and Dragons. The plot is split into two parts that take place simultaneously, with one storyline following the stranded ninja, Kai, Cole, Jay, Zane, and Wu in the Realm of Oni and Dragons, and the other focusing on Lloyd Garmadon, Nya, and their allies surviving in Ninjago City following its takeover by Lord Garmadon (now holding the title of "Emperor"). The season features two main antagonists: the Iron Baron, leader of a group of Dragon Hunters in the Realm of Oni and Dragons, who attempts to capture the marooned ninja; and Garmadon, who, alongside the Sons of Garmadon, seeks to eliminate Lloyd and his allies so that no one will oppose his reign. Hunted also depicts the rapid aging of Wu from a child back to his former old self, allowing him to return to his previous role of the ninja's mentor. The season culminates in a final battle between Lloyd and Garmadon, in which the latter is defeated but warns Lloyd of an incoming threat, resulting in a cliffhanger that is resolved in the following season.

== Voice cast ==
=== Main ===
- Sam Vincent as Lloyd Garmadon, the Green Ninja and Elemental Master of Energy
- Vincent Tong as Kai, the Red Ninja and Elemental Master of Fire
- Michael Adamthwaite as Jay, the Blue Ninja and Elemental Master of Lightning
- Brent Miller as Zane, the Titanium Ninja and Elemental Master of Ice
- Kirby Morrow as Cole, the Black Ninja and Elemental Master of Earth
- Kelly Metzger as Nya, the Light Blue Ninja, Elemental Master of Water and Kai's sister
- Paul Dobson as Sensei Wu, the wise teacher of the ninja
- Madyx Whiteway as Wu (kid)
- Mark Oliver as Emperor Garmadon
- Britt McKillip as Harumi
- Brian Drummond as Iron Baron

=== Recurring ===
- Jennifer Hayward as P.I.X.A.L., a female nindroid
- Kathleen Barr as Misako/Faith/Heavy Metal
- Tabitha St. Germain as Mistaké
- Alan Marriot as Dareth
- Garry Chalk as Killow
- Maggie Blue O'Hara as Ultra Violet
- Brent Miller as Mr. E/Muzzle
- Doron Bell as Griffin Turner
- Heather Doerksen as Skylor
- Scott McNeil as Karlof/Chew Toy
- Paul Dobson as Neuro/Mother Doomsday
- Andrew Francis as Shade
- Kirby Morrow as Mr. Paleman
- Michael Adamthwaite as Luke Cunningham
- Kai Emmett as Young Garmadon
- Jim Conrad as the First Spinjitzu Master
- Brian Dobson as Ronin
- Kelly Sheridan as Gayle Gossip
- Michael Donovan as Police Commissioner/Arkade
- Ian James Corlett as Daddy No Legs
- Rhona Rees as Jet Jack

== Production ==
=== Animation ===
The animation for the ninth season was produced at Wil Film ApS in Denmark.

=== Direction ===
The episodes for the ninth season were directed by Michael Helmuth Hansen, Peter Hausner, Jens Møller, Peter Egeberg and Trylle Vilstrup.

== Release ==
The Lego Group released an official 90-second trailer on May 27, 2018 on the Lego YouTube channel to promote the season. The episodes were released in three parts on Cartoon Network on August 11, August 18, and August 25, 2018.

== Plot ==
With Emperor Garmadon ruling Ninjago City, Lloyd, Nya and their allies are forced into hiding. Lloyd feels helpless, having lost both his elemental powers and his friends, but finds hope when Mistaké tells him that the ninja have survived. (Note: Ninjago, Season 9, Episode 1 "Firstbourne") Lloyd, Nya, and several Elemental Masters form a resistance against Lord Garmadon. The resistance infiltrates Borg Tower and Lloyd broadcasts a message of hope to the people of Ninjago. (Note: Ninjago, Season 9, Episode 3 "Radio Free Ninjago") The Sons of Garmadon ambush their secret base, but Lloyd, Nya, Skylor and Dareth escape.

Meanwhile, the other four ninja and Wu (who has been rapidly aged up to a child and later to a teenager), are surviving in the Realm of Oni and Dragons. Kai, Jay and Zane are captured by Iron Baron and his band of dragon hunters and forced to compete in the Dragon Pit, a gladiator-style arena. Cole and Wu plot the ninja's escape and succeed when Firstbourne, the Mother of all Dragons, attacks the camp. During the chaos, Kai sets free the dragons that are held in captivity. (Note: Ninjago, Season 9, Episode 4 "How to build a Dragon") In the wilderness, the ninja meet a rogue dragon hunter named Faith. She tells the story of how the First Spinjitzu Master shared a connection with Firstbourne by wearing his Dragon Armour. (Note: Ninjago, Season 9, Episode 5 "The Guilded Path") Wu, Faith and the ninja set off to find Firstbourne's nest. On the journey, Faith trains the ninja to use chain rifles to take down large dragons.

In Ninjago City, Lloyd discovers that Mistaké can shapeshift because she is an Oni. They plan to take down the Sons of Garmadon and eventually capture Harumi. (Note: Ninjago, Season 9, Episode 6 "Two Lies, One Truth") Mistaké takes the form of Harumi to get Skylor close to Garmadon so that she can absorb his power. Unfortunately, Harumi arrives at Borg Tower at the same moment that Mistaké is impersonating her. (Note: Ninjago, Season 9, Episode 7 "The Weakest Link") Mistaké reveals her true Oni form and battles with Garmadon. During the fight, Skylor absorbs Garmadon's power and escapes, but Mistaké is killed. Skylor attempts to control Garmadon's Colossus using his power, but it poisons her. The Colossus falls onto a building, which collapses and kills Harumi, while Lloyd and Nya flee the city.

In the First Realm, the ninja are hunted down once again and captured, so Wu promises to lead Iron Baron to the Dragon Armour. (Note: Ninjago, Season 9, Episode 8 "Saving Faith") When they arrive at Firstbourne's nest, Iron Baron seizes the armour, but Wu reveals that it was not the armour that caused Firstbourne to trust his father, but the goodness in his heart. Firstbourne encases Iron Baron inside molten rock, allowing Wu to take the armour. With the help of Firstbourne, the Ninja and Wu are able to return to Ninjago on the dragons. (Note: Ninjago, Season 9, Episode 9 "Lessons for a Master")

Lloyd and the ninja are reunited in Ninjago City and plan a final battle with Garmadon. Wu and Lloyd fly to Borg Tower on Firstbourne to confront Garmadon. Meanwhile, the ninja attempt to bring down the Colossus using their chain rifles and are able to defeat it with the help of Ninjago citizens. Lloyd battles with his father at the top of Borg Tower, but realises that the fight fuels his father's powers and learns to resist him rather than fight back. As a result, Garmadon's powers are diminished and Lloyd's elemental power returns. Ninjago is finally free from Garmadon's reign, but before Garmadon is arrested, he warns Lloyd of an incoming threat he foresaw: "the darkness". (Note: Ninjago, Season 9, Episode 10 "Green Destiny")

== Episodes ==
No. overall	No. in season	Title	Directed by	Written by	Story by	Original release date	U.S. viewers (millions)
85	1	"Firstbourne"	Peter Hausner	The Hageman Brothers	The Hageman Brothers	August 11, 2018	0.45
It's been a week since the newly-styled Emperor Garmadon seized control of Ninjago City. Amidst the chaotic, tyrannical regime, an underground resistance begins to form, led by Nya and Lloyd. Meanwhile, in the First Realm, the other ninjas with a Kid Wu find themselves shipwrecked. Attempting to ensure their survival, they soon discover that they are not alone, in the realm...
86	2	"Iron & Stone"	Michael Helmuth Hansen	Bragi Schut	The Hageman Brothers	August 11, 2018	0.45
The mysterious tribe which captured Kai, Jay, and Zane, named the Dragon Hunters, take them to their leader, the Iron Baron, who seems convinced that the Ninja are Oni and killed the Ultra Dragon. They are escorted to a perilous arena and made to battle a dragon. In a bid to help their friends, Cole and Wu go undercover as Dragon Hunters. In Ninjago, Garmadon destroys Mr. E for failing to capture Lloyd, while the elemental masters, along with Mistaké, reveals to Lloyd that his friends are in Realm of Oni and Dragons and join the Resistance, and seek to inspire Lloyd to regain his power and next is his Golden Power.
87	3	"Radio Free Ninjago"	Jens Møller	The Hageman Brothers	The Hageman Brothers	August 11, 2018	0.45
Mistaké challenges Lloyd to find his voice, convincing him to broadcast a message to inspire the people. In the First Realm, Kai, Jay, and Zane have been captured and imprisoned in the Dieselnaut and are to be used as bait for that night's dragon hunt. Cole and Wu, still disguised, join the hunt and learn about the Firstbourne Dragon, the leader mother and queen of all dragons, who wields all the elements. Meeting with the imprisoned Ninja, Cole assures them that they will find a way out of their predicament, "for us, and the dragons".
88	4	"How to Build a Dragon"	Trylle Vilstrup	Bragi Schut	The Hageman Brothers	August 11, 2018	0.45
The Ninja are taken to the Dragon Hunter's village. Planning to escape, they resolve to build a simulated Firstbourne with Cole and Wu. The resistance, led by a newly motivated Lloyd devise tactics for overthrowing Garmadon. Dareth, feeling excluded due to his lack of elemental power, convinces Mistaké to help him help obtain 'brown power'.
89	5	"The Gilded Path"	Michael Helmuth Hansen	Bragi Schut	The Hageman Brothers	August 18, 2018	0.50
Harumi leads an attack on the secret headquarters of the resistance. Now sundered, and living in the slums, those remaining discover a secret about Mistaké. The Ninja, now free from the hunters, wake to find a now teenager Wu remembering more about his past. Finding an unlikely ally in Heavy Metal, the Iron Baron's second-in-command, who reveals himself to be a woman named Faith, Wu leads the group to look for the legendary Dragon Armour, which would help them control the Firstbourne Dragon, to save the Realm and return to Ninjago.
90	6	"Two Lies, One Truth"	Jens Møller	The Hageman Brothers	The Hageman Brothers	August 18, 2018	0.50
Mistaké reveals her true origins to the Resistance and teaches Lloyd that he must transform one final time into the great leader he is destined to become. Meanwhile, Emperor Garmadon embraces Harumi as his daughter of darkness and sends her to capture Lloyd, but she ends up being captured herself. Continuing on their journey with Faith through the desert, the team venture into Oni territory, where they discover that all the Oni are long gone, as well as a map showing the Dragon Armor to be inside Firstbourne's nest.
91	7	"The Weakest Link"	Trylle Vilstrup	The Hageman Brothers	The Hageman Brothers	August 18, 2018	0.50
Faith teaches the Ninja to use vengestone harpoons and Wu to ride a dragon, but when they are found by the Dragon Hunters who capture Faith, Wu and the Ninja are forced to continue their journey alone. Meanwhile, in Ninjago, the Resistance keeps Harumi hostage at their hideout and come up with a plan to have Mystaké disguised as her and Skylor as a prisoner goes to Garmadon's base so that Skylor could borrow his powers and thus be able to control Colossus. However, things don't go as good as planned when Harumi escapes and goes to warn Garmadon.
92	8	"Saving Faith"	Michael Helmuth Hansen & Peter Egeberg	The Hageman Brothers	The Hageman Brothers	August 25, 2018	0.34
After trying to rescue Faith, the Ninja and Wu get captured. Faith reveals the Iron Baron's lies to the other Dragon Hunters, while Wu ages up to a young adult and regains all his memories. He makes a deal with Iron Baron who, in exchange for the Dragon Armor, promises to send the Ninja back home. In Ninjago, after being discovered, Mistaké reveals her true Oni nature to Garmadon and confronts him, allowing Skylor to borrow his powers and escape, while she is presumably killed. Skylor struggles with Garmadon over the control of Colossus, but she ends up "poisoned" and Colossus accidentally destroys a building full of people. Harumi goes inside and rescues a family, but the building collapses and she dies. This angers Garmadon, who swears to destroy Lloyd and the entire Ninjago City.
93	9	"Lessons for a Master"	Jens Møller	Bragi Schut	The Hageman Brothers	August 25, 2018	0.34
After Harumi's death, Garmadon angrily begins destroying the entire Ninjago City with Colossus, while Lloyd and the others head to a more remote side of the city, waiting for Wu and the other Ninja to return. They run into Ultra Violet, whom Nya has a fight with and gets injured, but they manage to defeat her and continue their path. In the Realm of Oni and Dragons, the Dragon Hunters release the Ninja and Faith after realising that Iron Baron showed his true colors and cares only about himself. Meanwhile, Wu takes Iron Baron to the Firstbourne Dragon's nest, where he dons the Dragon Armor. However, the Firstbourne senses the evil in him and attacks, trapping him in molten rock and leaving him to die. Wu then finds the Armor and becomes the Golden Dragon Master, riding the Firstbourne back to the Ninja and the Dragon Hunters. Faith decides to remain here to lead the Hunters and try making the Realm a better place, while Wu and the Ninja ride each a dragon back home... back to Ninjago!
94	10	"Green Destiny"	Peter Hausner	The Hageman Brothers	The Hageman Brothers	August 25, 2018	0.34
Wu and the four Ninja are finally back home and reunite with their friends. Nya and Dareth take Skylor to safety, while Kai, Jay, Zane, and Cole rescue the civilians and fight Colossus, and Lloyd and Wu confront Garmadon. The Elemental Masters and the Ninja's other allies escape from Kryptarium prison and help the Ninja defeat Colossus, while Garmadon defeats Wu and the Firstbourne Dragon, leaving only Lloyd to fight him. After understanding that fighting is what gives Garmadon his powers, Lloyd stops fighting him and just "resists him" instead, by using the Art of the Silent Fist, which causes Garmadon to slowly lose all his powers and Lloyd to restore his and next is his Golden Power. However, although Garmadon is finally defeated, he warns Lloyd that his powers were the only thing strong enough to prevent some dark forces from attacking Ninjago, and now that they're gone, "they" will come and destroy everything. In the aftermath of the battle, Colossus gets destroyed and all the Sons of Garmadon, including Garmadon, are arrested; Skylor gets back to normal health who wakes up tended by Kai and after her health is restored; and the people of Ninjago celebrate the Ninja and their allies. Some time later, Lloyd meets with Wu, now back to his normal age, who tells him that the Firstbourne and the other dragons have to return to The First Realm, and will return only when they'll be needed again. Lloyd then tells Wu about his father's warnings and, after learning that all the Oni are gone from The First Realm, concludes that "they" means the Oni, and that "they" are coming.: The Fold Band appear as Lego band singing The Weekend Whip.

== Critical reception ==
Reviewer Melissa Camacho for Common Sense Media gave Hunted a 3 out of 5 star rating and noted that the season "features the series' traditional themes of teamwork, sacrifice, and loyalty, but also addresses the need to protect a living species from harm, and the loss of a loved one". The reviewer also commented, "The latest installment of the franchise has all the mythical stories, action sequences, and evil characters necessary to create an entertaining action series."
