= Ninjago: March of the Oni =

Danish animated television season

- Season 10
- March of the Oni poster
- Starring: Sam Vincent; Vincent Tong; Michael Adamthwaite; Brent Miller; Kirby Morrow; Kelly Metzger; Paul Dobson; Mark Oliver
- No. of episodes: 4

Release
- Original network: Cartoon Network
- Original release: April 19, 2019

Season chronology
- ← Previous; Hunted Next → Secrets of the Forbidden Spinjitzu

March of the Oni is the tenth season of the animated television series Ninjago: Masters of Spinjitzu (titled Ninjago from the eleventh season onward). The series was created by Michael Hegner and Tommy Andreasen. The season aired on April 19, 2019, following the ninth season, Hunted. It is succeeded by the eleventh season, Secrets of the Forbidden Spinjitzu. The tenth season consists of just four episodes, making it the shortest season at the time of release since the original pilot season. The four episodes when combined form a feature-length movie with a runtime of 90 minutes.

The tenth season was the final season to be animated by Wil Film ApS in Denmark before the release of the eleventh season, which marked a significant change in the format of the show. From the eleventh season onwards, the series was animated by WildBrain Studios in Canada and the "Masters of Spinjitzu" subtitle was dropped. The runtime for each episode also changed from 22 minutes to 11 minutes.

March of the Oni marks the conclusion of the Oni storyline that started with the eighth season, Sons of Garmadon, and picks up directly from the ending of the previous season, in which Lord Garmadon warned his son Lloyd of an incoming threat to Ninjago: the Oni. The storyline of the tenth season follows the main ninja characters and their allies, including Garmadon, as they fight the advance of the invading Oni army, who are trying to cover all of Ninjago in darkness.

== Voice cast ==
=== Main ===
- Sam Vincent as Lloyd Garmadon, the Green Ninja
- Vincent Tong as Kai, the red ninja and Elemental Master of Fire
- Michael Adamthwaite as Jay, the blue ninja and Elemental Master of Lightning
- Brent Miller as Zane, the white/titanium ninja and Elemental Master of Ice
- Kirby Morrow as Cole, the black ninja and Elemental Master of Earth
- Kelly Metzger as Nya, the Elemental Master of Water and Kai's sister
- Paul Dobson as Sensei Wu, the wise teacher of the ninja
- Mark Oliver as Lord Garmadon

=== Recurring ===
- Jennifer Hayward as P.I.X.A.L., a female nindroid
- Kathleen Barr as Misako/Faith
- Zach LeBlanc as The Omega
- Jim Conrad as the First Spinjitzu Master
- Alan Marriott as Dareth
- Daniel Doheny as Jimmy
- Michael Donovan as Police Commissioner
- Kelly Sheridan as Gayle Gossip

== Production ==
=== Animation ===
March of the Oni was the last season to be animated in Denmark by Wil Film ApS. With the production of the eleventh season titled Secrets of the Forbidden Spinjitzu, the show took a new format and was animated in Canada by WildBrain Studios. The Lego Group announced the changes in May 2019 with the trailer for the eleventh season by stating, "Ninjago: 'March of the Oni' marks the conclusion to an epic storyline which started in 2018. After a little vacation-time, it's time for the ninja to get ready for a brand-new adventure! The upcoming TV season will have 30 episodes of 11 minutes each, making it the ninjas' biggest adventure yet. The season picks up shortly after March of the Oni and remains true to the story canon and the characters."

=== Writing ===
In December 2018, the original writers of the series The Hageman Brothers announced that they would be leaving the series. With the production of March of the Oni, Bragi Schut took over as writer for the show. The Hageman Brothers commented on their departure from the show on Twitter by stating, "Though it saddens us to tell our Ninjago fans we've written our last episode, we are encouraged to know it won't be the last Ninjago adventure. We've known for a while that after 8 great years, S9 would be our final curtain call...While we helped the story development for the lead up to the 100th Episode, it's truly the work and genius of our friend @bragischutjr. We feel lucky to be able to help pick our predecessor and we know Ninjago is safe in his capable hands."

== Release ==
March of the Oni was released on April 19, 2019 on Cartoon Network comprising all four episodes.

== Plot ==
Since Lord Garmadon's defeat, Ninjago City has been rebuilt. However, when Lloyd visits his father in Kryptarium Prison, Garmadon warns him that the "Bringers of Doom" are coming, but Lloyd refuses to listen. Meanwhile, the ninja are presented with a newly rebuilt Destiny's Bounty. Garmadon's warnings soon prove to be justified when the Oni demons invade Ninjago by entering through the Realm Crystal. A darkness spreads across Ninjago City and petrifies anyone who touches it. On board Destiny's Bounty, the ninja race to Ninjago City to rescue the citizens from the darkness. However, when the ninja use their elemental powers against the dark cloud, they discover that they have no impact. Lloyd visits his father in Kryptarium Prison for advice. With no other choice, the ninja release Garmadon from prison and form an uneasy alliance with him in an attempt to defeat the Oni and save Ninjago from the darkness. (Note: Ninjago, Season 10, Episode 1 "The Darkness Comes")

Back on the Bounty, Garmadon tells the ninja that the only way to save Ninjago is to destroy the Realm Crystal, which is located at Borg Tower. Lloyd and Garmadon agree that they alone can safely venture into the darkness and not be petrified because of their Oni blood. While Lloyd and Garmadon enter the darkness, the ninja receive a distress signal from the NGTV building. They decide to go and help the people trapped there, while P.I.X.A.L. stays behind to help Lloyd and Garmadon. When Lloyd and Garmadon reach the Realm Crystal, Garmadon tries to destroy it, but they are confronted by the Omega, the Oni leader. (Note: Ninjago, Season 10, Episode 2 "Into the Breach") While fighting the Omega and the Oni, Lloyd destroys the Realm Crystal with the Sword of Sanctuary, but it fails to stop them. Lloyd and Garmadon then find the Armour of the Golden Master and realise that it causes the Oni to recoil. They escape from Borg Tower, taking the armour with them and are picked up by P.I.X.A.L. As the ninja are helping people escape at the NGTV building, Nya accidentally pushes the thrust lever the wrong way and Cole, who is hanging from a ladder, falls from the Destiny's Bounty into the darkness, seemingly killing him. (Note: Ninjago, Season 10, Episode 3 "The Fall")

After Lloyd and Garmadon return, the ninja fly to the Monastery of Spinjitzu so that Kai can reforge the Golden Weapons, believing that this can stop the Oni. When the Oni attack the monastery, a battle takes place outside the walls. During the battle, the ninja are slowly overwhelmed by the growing Oni horde, but Cole arrives in the Earth Driller and the ninja realise that he has survived. Jay then asks Nya to be his "Yang," and Nya happily accepts, without hesitation. When all hope seems lost, the ninja, Wu and Garmadon join forces and use Spinjitzu to make the Tornado of Creation, which results in the Oni's destruction. After the battle, Lloyd experiences a vision where he meets the First Spinjitzu Master, his paternal grandfather, who thanks him for saving Ninjago. Garmadon leaves for parts unknown as the ninja celebrate their victory and shared history by placing their handprints on the wall mural of the Monastery of Spinjitzu. (Note: Ninjago, Season 10, Episode 4 "Endings")

== Episodes ==
While being only four episodes, the shortest season in Ninjago, it has also alternatively been edited into a feature-length television film in the United States, spanning 90 minutes.

No. overall	No. in season	Title	Directed by	Written by	Original release date	U.S. viewers (millions)
95	1	"The Darkness Comes"	Per Risager	Bragi Schut	April 19, 2019	0.44
Lloyd visits Garmadon at Kryptarium prison, who tells him that "The Darkness", which is to destroy all the realms, is soon going to arrive in Ninjago soon. Meanwhile, Cole, Zane and P.I.X.A.L go to the Ninjago harbour to receive an award, which they are surprised to discover is a rebuilt "Destiny's Bounty". Faith, who has been severely injured, arrives at the monastery to warn Wu and the ninja that the darkness has consumed the Realm of Oni and Dragons and is heading for Ninjago next. After Ninjago City is covered in a cloud of darkness, Lloyd reluctantly decides to free Garmadon from Kryptarium Prison so that he may help the ninja combat this new threat.
96	2	"Into the Breach"	Peter Hausner	Bragi Schut	April 19, 2019	0.44
Having freed Garmadon from prison, the ninja are beset by doubts, particularly Lloyd. After a provoked battle results in the return of Garmadon's powers, Lloyd and Garmadon enter the cloud of darkness in an effort to stop the Oni invasion. After encountering a pair of Oni, the two reach the Realm Crystal, but are too late, as the Oni's leader, Omega, is released upon Ninjago.
97	3	"The Fall"	Frederik Budolph	Bragi Schut	April 19, 2019	0.44
While Lloyd and Garmadon try to escape the Oni, P.I.X.A.L. prepares to enter the darkness to save them. Meanwhile, the Ninja tend to a distress call, but Cole ends up falling into the darkness. Garmadon and Lloyd obtain the Armour of the Golden Master, and Nya tells Kai he must melt the armor back into the Golden Weapons.
98	4	"Endings"	Peter Hausner	Bragi Schut	April 19, 2019	0.44
The Ninja return to the Monastery of Spinjitzu, in the last stand between them and the Oni. Kai recreates the Golden Weapons to help the team fight the Oni. In the midst of the battle, Cole, who has survived the darkness, returns to the monastery as well. The Ninja, Wu and Garmadon eventually use the Tornado of Creation to defeat the Oni, but this causes Lloyd to pass out. He sees his grandfather, the First Spinjitzu Master, in a vision before waking up, while Garmadon departs in silence. The Ninja and their allies celebrate their victory by putting their hand together on the Monastery's wall.
