= Kathleen Barr =

Canadian voice actress

- Occupation: Voice actress
- Years active: 1979–present
- Spouse: David Marr
- Children: 2

Kathleen Barr is a Canadian voice actress. She is best known for the voice of Evil-Lyn in He-Man and the Masters of the Universe, Marie Kanker and Kevin in Ed, Edd n Eddy, Dot Matrix in ReBoot, Trixie Lulamoon and Queen Chrysalis in My Little Pony: Friendship Is Magic, Misako, Aspheera (in Season 15) in Ninjago, and the Source and Arc Dragons of Focus in Ninjago: Dragons Rising. She also voiced Henri Richard Maurice Dutoit LeFevbre in Liberty's Kids, Kaiko Nekton in The Deep, Wheezie in Dragon Tales, and Gelorum in Hot Wheels: World Race and its 4-film sequel AcceleRacers.

== Filmography ==
=== Animation ===
- Galaxy Express 999 (1979) – Maetel, Kenae Hoshino, Promethium
- Adieu Galaxy Express 999 (1981) – Maetel, Queen Promethium
- Superbook (1981) – Salome, Noah's Wife, Principal Travis, Woman #1, Rebekah, Rebekah's Mother, Sam, Student
- Maison Ikkoku (1986) – Kyoko's Mother (English version)
- Ranma ½ (1990) – Cologne
- Ranma ½: Chûgoku Nekonron daikessen! Okite yaburi no gekitô hen (1991) – Cologne, Tsubasa Kurenai (English version)
- Ranma ½: Kessen Tôgenkyô! Hanayome o torimodose!! (1992) – Cologne (English version)
- Conan the Adventurer (1992–1993) – Mesmira
- Mega Man: Upon a Star (1993, TV Mini-Series) – Mrs. Kobayashi
- The Baby Huey Show (1993)
- Adventures of Sonic the Hedgehog (1993) – Momma Robotnik, Katella, additional voices
- Animated Classic Showcase (1993)
- Stone Protectors (1993)
- Cinderella (1994) – Stepmother, Stepsister #2, Fairy Godmother
- Leo the Lion: King of the Jungle (1994, direct-to-video) – Elephant
- Mega Man (1994) – Bobby
- King Arthur and the Knights of Justice (1994) – Guinevere, Morgana Le Faye
- Exosquad (1994) – Colleen O'Reilly
- Conan and the Young Warriors (1994) – Sulinara
- Dino Babies (1994–1995) – Truman
- Hurricanes (1994–1996)
- ReBoot (1994–2001) – Dot Matrix, Princess Bula
- Snow White (1995) – Snow White, The Evil Queen
- Hercules (1995) – Hera, Megara
- Littlest Pet Shop (1995) – Mumsy, Bernice
- Jingle Bell Rock (1995, TV Short) – Woman, Assistant, Holly Labello
- G.I. Joe Extreme (1995–1996)
- Street Fighter (1995–1997) – Lucinda Davila
- Billy the Cat (1996) – Mom
- Nilus the Sandman (1996)
- The Adventures of Corduroy (1996–1997) - Bearimore
- The Wacky World of Tex Avery (1997) – Chastity Knott
- The Fearless Four (1997) – Wasp #2, Big Mother Berta, Samantha, Mozart, Mouse
- Mummies Alive! (1997) – Chontra, Neith, Sekhmet, Bastet
- Night Warriors: Darkstalkers' Revenge (1997) – Morrigan Aensland
- Salty's Lighthouse (1997–1998) – Ocho and Aunt Chovie
- Roswell Conspiracies: Aliens, Myths and Legends (1997–1999)
- Rudolph the Red-Nosed Reindeer: The Movie (1998) – Rudolph, Twinkle the Sprite
- Monkey Magic (1998) – Fania, Blossom (English version)
- Pocket Dragon Adventures (1998) – Scribbles
- Fat Dog Mendoza (1998) – Various voices
- Camelot: The Legend (1998) – Guinevere, Griselda
- Weird-Oh's (1999) – Digger
- NASCAR Racers (1999, TV Movie) – Megan "Spitfire" Fassler
- Sabrina: The Animated Series (1999)
- Mama, Do You Love Me? (1999, Video short) – Mama and Woman
- Sherlock Holmes in the 22nd Century (1999)
- Dragon Tales (1999) – Wheezie, Max and Emmy's mom, Polly Nimbus, Ord's Mother, Whinni's Mother, Mrs. Talent Pool, Miss Tree Snail, Maestro, Misstro, Mungus's Mother, Crystal
- Ed, Edd n Eddy (1999) – Kevin, Marie Kanker
- Beast Machines: Transformers (2000) – Botanica
- Grandma Got Run Over by a Reindeer (2000 – Animated Christmas Special) – I.M. Slime, Rita Spankenheimer, Policewoman
- Casper's Haunted Christmas (2000) – Carol Jollimore
- Robin and the Dreamweavers (2000) – Frass, Anchorwoman
- Rainbow Fish (2000) – Wanda the Octopus, Angel, Mrs. Flounder, Goldie, Turquoise and Blue's Mom
- Generation O! (2000-2001) – Mrs. O
- D'Myna Leagues (2000-2001) – Divinity Plunkett
- Troll Tales (2000-2001) – Snapper
- What About Mimi? (2000-2002)
- Scruff (2000-2004) - Sanda
- Barbie in the Nutcracker (2001) – Elisabeth Drosselmayer, Owl
- A Christmas Adventure from a Book Called Wisely's Tales (2001) – Honey Bunny
- Rudolph the Red-Nosed Reindeer and the Island of Misfit Toys (2001) – Rudolph, Mrs. Claus, Tooth Fairy, Rocking Horse, Peggy, Dolly for Sue, Adina, Female Cardinal
- Ultimate Book of Spells (2001-2002) – Lucretia
- Sitting Ducks (2001-2003) – Bev
- Super Duper Sumos (2002)
- He-Man and the Masters of the Universe (2002-2004) – Evil-Lyn (uncredited)
- Make Way for Noddy (2002) – Martha Monkey, Clockwork Mouse (US Re-Dub)
- Movie Toons: Treasure Island (2002)
- Groove Squad (2002) – Roxanne
- Stargate Infinity (2002-2003) – Draga
- Liberty's Kids (2002-2003) – Henri LeFevbre
- ¡Mucha Lucha! (2002-2004, TV Series short) – Prima Donna Hodges, Buena Mom, Mrs. Flea, La Piñata, Masked Bus Driver, Irma, Churro, Lady, Baby
- The Cramp Twins (2002-2004) – Miss Monkfish
- Bionicle: Mask of Light (2003) – Toa Gali
- Barbie of Swan Lake (2003) – Marie, The Fairy Queen
- My Little Pony: A Charming Birthday (2003, Video short) – Kimono and Sweetberry
- Gadget & the Gadgetinis (2003) – Super G.G.
- Tom and Jerry: Paws for a Holiday (2003)
- Stellaluna (2004, Video short) – Kasuku, Skeptical Bat, Other Bat
- My Scene: Jammin' in Jamaica (2004, TV Short) – Madison
- My Scene: Masquerade Madness (2004, TV Short) – Madison
- Barbie as the Princess and the Pauper (2004) – Serafina, Bertie
- In Search of Santa (2004) – Queen Penelope, Mrs. Clause, Agonysia, Katie, Marcus, Mimi
- Being Ian (2004) – Rachel, Dot, European Wheelbarrow Woman, Dr. Edwards
- Dragon Booster (2004-2006) – Lance Penn, Marianis, Dragon City News Reporter, Chute
- ¡Mucha Lucha!: The Return of El Maléfico (2005) – Mrs. Flea, Buena Mom, Disco Woman, Queen Voladora
- Barbie: Fairytopia (2005) – Laverna, Pixie #2, Pixie #4
- Krypto the Superdog (2005) – Mary Whitney, Isis, Andrea's Mom, Delilah
- Ark (2005) – Piriel
- Hot Wheels: AcceleRacers (2005) – Gelorum
- My Scene Goes Hollywood: The Movie (2005) – Madison
- Barbie and the Magic of Pegasus (2005) – Shiver, Queen, Rayla the Cloud Queen, Eric, Troll, Wife #1
- Hot Wheels Acceleracers the Ultimate Race (2005) – Gelorum
- Bionicle 3: Web of Shadows (2005) – Roodaka, Rahaga Gaaki
- Johnny Test (2005) – Lila Test, Janet Nelson Jr., Blast Ketchup, General's Technician, Tyler, Surfer Dudette, Beatrice
- Firehouse Tales (2005-2006)
- Candy Land: The Great Lollipop Adventure (2005) – Princess Frostine
- Coconut Fred's Fruit Salad Island! (2005-2006) – Mrs. Plumcott
- My Little Pony: The Princess Promenade (2006) – Kimono, Sweetberry
- Barbie Fairytopia: Mermaidia (2006) – Laverna
- Hot Wheels Highway 35 World Race (2005-2006) – Gelorum
- Barbie in the 12 Dancing Princesses (2006) – Delia
- Class of the Titans (2006) – Athena, The Horae
- Mix Master (2006) – Ditt
- Betsy's Kindergarten Adventures (2006) – Gabbi
- Powerpuff Girls Z (2006-2007) – Cody, Butch, Sam
- Pucca (2006-2008) – Ssoso, Doga, Hottie
- Mosaic (2007) – Facade, Mrs. Nottenmyer
- Highlander: The Search for Vengeance (2007) – Moya
- Barbie Fairytopia: Magic of the Rainbow (2007) – Laverna
- ToddWorld (2007) – Officer Becky, Child, Elephant
- Roary the Racing Car (2007) - Additional voices
- Betsy Bubblegum's Journey Through Yummi-Land (2007, Video short) – Ruby Red Licorice, Libby Lynn Lily
- The Ten Commandments (2007) – Miriam
- Storm Hawks (2007) – Lynn, Garrett (Pork Chop)
- Jibber Jabber (2007) – Jibber, Mom
- Finley the Fire Engine (2007) – Polly, Lois
- Tom and Jerry: A Nutcracker Tale (2007) – Nelly
- Bratz (2007) – Miss Vanderzandy, Ms. Porterhouse
- Care Bears: Oopsy Does It! (2007) – Best Friend Bear
- Edgar & Ellen (2007-2008) – Edgar, various voices
- Care Bears: Adventures in Care-a-lot (2007-2008) – Best Friend Bear
- Holly Hobbie & Friends: Fabulous Fashion Show (2008) - Portia, Portia's Mom
- Holly Hobbie & Friends: Marvelous Makeover (2009) - K.T., Becca
- Barbie: Mariposa (2008) – Rayna
- Barbie and the Diamond Castle (2008) – Lydia
- Barbie in a Christmas Carol (2008) – Chuzzlewit, Spirit of Christmas Present, Mrs. Dorrit
- Kid vs. Kat (2008-2011) – Millie Burtonburger, Kat, Tutankitty
- Martha Speaks (2008-2013) – Ronald Boxwood, Polly, Mrs. Demson
- Barbie Presents: Thumbelina (2009) – Vanessa
- Barbie and the Three Musketeers (2009) – Hèlène
- Inuyasha (2009) – Ogre Princess Oni Head
- Hot Wheels Battle Force 5 (2009) – Agura Ibaden, Hatch, Kyburi, Zen, Korosivash
- Dinosaur Train (2009) – Mrs. Corythosaurus, Trudy Triceratops, Laura Giganotosaurus, Dolores Tyrannosaurus, Velma Velociraptor, Peggy Peteinosaurus, Mrs. Ornithomimus, Angela Avisaurus (One Small Dinosaur/T. Rex Migration), Erma Eoraptor
- Barbie in A Mermaid Tale (2010) – Eris, Snouts
- Care Bears to the Rescue (2010)
- Hero: 108 (2010) – Lady Green, Pangolin Queen
- Care Bears: The Giving Festival (2010) – Best Friend Bear
- The Twisted Whiskers Show (2010) – Cutie Snoot, Flouncie
- The Little Prince (2010) – Fovea (English version)
- Care Bears: Share Bear Shines (2010) – Best Friend Bear
- My Little Pony: Friendship Is Magic (2010-2019) – Hoops (adult), Foggy Fleece, "Lucy Packard", Queen Chrysalis, Trixie Lulamoon, Crackle Cosette, Tall Inn-Staying Pony
- Barbie in A Mermaid Tale 2 (2011) – Eris, Snouts, Surfer Kathleen
- Rated A for Awesome (2011) – Angelina
- Quest for Zhu (2011) – Mazhula (voice)
- Strawberry Shortcake's Berry Bitty Adventures (2011-2015) – Mavis Maraschino
- Slugterra (2012-2013) – Master Shanai, Sylvia, Female Restaurant Thug, Granny Molenoid, Mystery Woman
- Littlest Pet Shop (2012-2016) – Anna Twombly, Jasper Jones, Madame Pom LeBlanc, various voices
- Ninjago (2012–2022) – Misako, Brad Tudabone, Gene, Marla, Bansha, Delara, Machia, Faith, Adventure-Ready Woman, Gamer Geek, Aspheera
- Inhumans (2013) – Teacher, Tonjana's Grandmother
- Wolverine: Origin (2013) – Rose, Aunt Hazel, Agnes
- Barbie: Mariposa & the Fairy Princess (2013) – Gwyllion, Anu
- Sabrina: Secrets of a Teenage Witch (2013-2014) – Enchantra, Tiffany Titan, Zanda, Troll Mistress, Max, Audience Member 2, Student
- Max Steel (2013-2015) – Katherine Ryan, Cute Girl, Security Voice, Laser-Lass
- Pac-Man and the Ghostly Adventures (2013-2015) – Madame Ghoulasha
- Wolverine versus Sabretooth (2014) – Storm, Woman, Feral, Wolfsbane
- Barbie: The Pearl Princess (2014) – Madame Ruckus
- LeapFrog Letter Factory Adventures DVD Series (2014, Video short) – Cousin Toad, Chief
- My Little Pony: Equestria Girls – Rainbow Rocks (2014) – Trixie Lulamoon
- Dr. Dimensionpants (2014-2015) – Ann-Mary Lipton, Liz Business
- Slugterra: Eastern Caverns (2015) – Dai-Fu (voice)
- Dinotrux (2015) – Drillian
- The Deep (2015-2019) – Kaiko Nekton, A.I.M.Y., Allen, Tethys
- Barbie in Princess Power (2015) – Newton
- Supernoobs (2015-2019) – Shope's mother, Emma #3, Ms. Kandinsky, Teen Worker, Princess Parsec, Queen Bee-anca, Female News Anchor, Kevina
- Open Season: Scared Silly (2016) – Bobbie, Edna, Tree-Hugger Lady
- Gintama° (2016) – Young Shinsuke Takasugi
- Kong: King of the Apes (2016) – Botila, Female Newscaster, Donny Botila Clone #1, Botila Clone #2, Botila Clone #3, Zippy, Middle Eastern Reporter, Mummo
- Mack & Moxy (2016) – Moxy, Sheriff Hiya, Mrs. Squiggly, Nolie
- Barbie: Spy Squad (2016) – Violet, Alarm
- Barbie & Her Sisters in a Puppy Chase (2016) – Silver, Island Hostess
- My Little Pony: Equestria Girls – Legend of Everfree (2016) – Trixie Lulamoon
- Ghost Patrol (2016) - Spooky, Mrs. Choi, Cat
- Tarzan and Jane (2017, TV Series short) – Kala, Veronica, Reporter, Dr. Blutgeld
- Super Monsters (2017) – Glorb, Dr. Jennifer Jekyll
- Llama Llama (2018) – Grandma Llama, Mama Gnu, Lenora Leopard, Ramona Rhino, Eleanor Elephant
- My Little Pony: Equestria Girls – Forgotten Friendship (2018) – Trixie Lulamoon
- ReBoot: The Guardian Code (2018) – Dot Matrix, Alyx
- The Hollow (2018) – Witches, Security Guard
- Polly Pocket (2018) – Barb, Captain Roco, Tanisha, Grunwalda Grande
- Corner Gas Animated (2018-2019) – Dora, Mavis, Helen, Tina, Queen Bee, Pregnant Woman #1, Middle Aged Woman, Woman's Voice, Blind Woman, Accountant #2, Player #1, Bunny, CEO, Drug Lord's Daughter, Mother, Gail
- Super Dinosaur (2018-2019) – Sarah Kingston, Tricerachops, Earth Core Agent (1), Earth Core Trainee #1, Female Earth Core Tech
- Mega Man: Fully Charged (2018-2019) – Hypno Woman, Blasto Woman
- Chip and Potato (2018-2019) – Mrs. Flingo, Mrs. Woolly, Granny Fant, Aardvark Grandma, Lily Llama, Carrie Orangutan, Ma Fant
- My Little Pony: Equestria Girls – Spring Breakdown (2019, TV Movie) – Trixie Lulamoon, Puffed Pastry
- My Little Pony: Equestria Girls – Sunset's Backstage Pass (2019, TV Movie) – Puffed Pastry
- My Little Pony: Equestria Girls – Holidays Unwrapped (2019) – Trixie Lulamoon
- The Bravest Knight (2019) - Big Yeti
- The Willoughbys (2020) – The Perfect Mom (voice)
- My Little Pony: Pony Life (2020–2021) – Trixie (voice)
- Johnny Test (2021 TV series) (2021) - Lila Test, Cop, Type "n" Talk, Blast Ketchup, Lab Alarm, Spectator, Tonal Translator
- Sunburnt Unicorn (2024)
- Ninjago: Dragons Rising (2025–2026) - Sora's mother, Aru, Old Lady Dragonian, Source Dragon of Focus, Arc Dragon of Focus, Bone Regent

=== Video games ===
- ReBoot (1998) – Dot Matrix
- SSX Tricky (2001) – Front End Voice – North America
- Dragon Tales: Dragon Seek (2001) – Wheezie
- Dragon Tales: Dragon Frog Jamboree (2001) – Wheezie
- Impossible Creatures (2002) – Lucy Willing, Velika La Pette
- Frogger Beyond (2002) – Frogger
- Ed, Edd n Eddy: Jawbreakers! (2002) – Marie Kanker, Kevin
- Ys VI: The Ark of Napishtim (2003) – Marve, Sophia, Sia, Olha, Jue (English dub)
- SSX 3 (2003)
- Frogger's Adventures: The Rescue (2003) – Frogger
- Dragon Tales: Learn & Fly with Dragons (2004) – Wheezie
- Under the Skin (2004) – Jill Valentine, Little Boy, Woman Cop, Casual Girl, Old Woman, Sexy Bunny, Becky (English dub)
- Frogger: Ancient Shadow (2005) – Frogger
- Devil Kings (2005) – Lady Butterfly (English dub)
- Ed, Edd n Eddy: The Mis-Edventures (2005) – Marie Kanker, Kevin
- Ed, Edd n Eddy: Scam of the Century (2007) – Kevin
- Cartoon Network Universe: FusionFall (2009) – Marie Kanker
- My Little Pony: Friendship Is Magic (2012) – Trixie Lulamoon, Queen Chrysalis

=== Live-action ===
- E! True Hollywood Story (1996, episodes 1-5) – Narrator of 2019 reboot
- Warriors of Virtue (1997) – Tsun (voice)

=== Other ===
- Care Bears – Best Friend Bear, Take Care Bear (as plush toys)
