= Team Hot Wheels =

American-Canadian animated series of movies

- Promotional art
- Genre: Sports (Auto racing)
- Written by: Derek Dressler; Patrick Casey; Josh Miller
- Story by: Shane Amsterdam; Scott Hart Derman
- Directed by: Matt Danner; Dan Fraga
- Starring: Ben Diskin; David Lodge; Grant George; Nicolas Roye
- Theme music composer: Rob Hudnut
- Composers: Rebecca Kneubuhl; Gabriel Mann
- Countries of origin: United States; Canada
- Original language: English

Production
- Producers: Margaret M. Dean; Kimberly A. Smith; Ben Burden Smith
- Running time: 77 minutes (1); 45 minutes (2 and 4); 22 minutes (3)
- Production companies: Mattel Playground Productions; Mercury Filmworks (1); Titmouse, Inc. (2-4)

Original release
- Network: Cartoon Network (1); Netflix (2 and 4); YouTube (3)
- Release: June 7, 2014 – October 5, 2015

Related
- Hot Wheels Battle Force 5

Team Hot Wheels is a series of animated movies by Mattel Playground Productions, Mercury Filmworks for the first film, and Titmouse for the second to fourth films. Based on Mattel's Hot Wheels toyline, the franchise currently consists of four features released through a multitude of distribution platforms. All were directed by Matt Danner.

The first film, The Origin of Awesome!, debuted in 660 theatres through a Fathom Events screening in the United States on June 7 and 8, 2014. It was later released on home video by Universal Studios Home Entertainment and aired on Cartoon Network. The first act was distributed as a 22-minute special on Netflix on February 3, 2014. The second film, The Skills to Thrill!, was released exclusively on Netflix on August 17, 2015. The third film, Search for the 5th Driver!, was released on YouTube in 2015, and made its linear debut on the KidsClick syndicated block on October 28, 2017. The fourth and final film, Build the Epic Race!, was released exclusively on Netflix on October 5, 2015.

== Cast and characters ==
- Gage Green (voiced by Grant George) is the leader of Team Hot Wheels. His car is the Twin Mill, that is until it was destroyed by the Road Pirates and currently drives the Twinduction at the end of "Build the Epic Race!". He has a constant phobia of hamsters, as being revealed in "The Skills to Thrill!", and loves to go fast. Gage's catchphrase is "It always comes down to speed!", which is also his motto in "The Origin of Awesome!". He is also the son of Mr. Green, who makes an appearance debut in the second film as well. His mother was also mentioned in the second film, respectively, but she didn't make an appearance in any of the films.
- Brandon (voiced by Ben Diskin) is the brains of Team Hot Wheels. His car is the Quick n' Sik, that is until it was destroyed by the Road Pirates and currently drives the Fast 4WD at the end of "Build the Epic Race!". Brandon's catchphrase is "Brandon likey.", and his Quick n' Sik has amazing in-car technology like the Vacu-Suck, and auto-pilot in "The Origin of Awesome!", a plunger, a cloning device, a power drill, and emergency crabo hands in "The Skills to Thrill!", and also super boost, spiral saws, hands, a sword, a force field, a broom, slick-proof tires, and rocket tires and also used the same plunger in "Build the Epic Race!" as well. However, the Fast 4WD also comes up with rocket tires and a tennis racket, too.
- Rhett (voiced by David Lodge) is the funny guy of Team Hot Wheels. His car is that Bone Shaker, that is until it was destroyed by the Road Pirates and currently drives the Surf Crate at the end of "Build the Epic Race!". Rhett's catchphrase is "I'm okay!", and in both "The Origin of Awesome!" and "The Skills to Thrill!", it has been revealed that he can relax his chi, and do karate. He also has a mother, who makes her only appearance in the second film, respectively.
- Wyatt (voiced by Nicolas Roye) is the cool guy of Team Hot Wheels that speaks in a Southern drawl. He's the driver of his Baja Truck a.k.a. Jump Truck by Wyatt himself, that is until it was destroyed by the Road Pirates and currently drives the Land Crusher at the end of "Build the Epic Race!". Wyatt's catchphrase is "Wyatt-Style, baby!", and his Baja Truck can jump on the top on one building to another. Wyatt is the only member of Team Hot Wheels to be raised by his grandmother, Gammy Gram, due to the fact that none of his parents have appeared in all of the films, nor being mentioned in them either. However, Wyatt-Style is an awesome stunt that he came up with, which is that in "Build the Epic Race!", he accidentally caused some destruction to the Epic Race Press Conference, and after Wyatt quits the team, Monkey replaced him, which is actually a part of the Road Pirates' plan, that is until Wyatt rejoined the team as a member, with Monkey being the newest member at the end of the film.

== Films ==
No.	Title	Original network	Original release date
1	"The Origin of Awesome!"	Cartoon Network	June 7, 2014
Gage, Wyatt, Brandon and Rhett are kids born to ride. Separately, they are seriously skilled racers, but together they become Team Hot Wheels! When a mysterious black car roars into town, the boys aren’t sure what to think. Is it the most awesome thing ever to happen to the town, or the worst? The mystery car creates incredible orange track wherever it goes- that’s the awesome part! But it also creates insane transformations and rampaging monsters- that’s the bad part! If Team Hot Wheels can’t stop this masked supervillain, the entire town will become a desert of destruction! Ride along as the boys discover their true inner racer, battle monster mayhem, confront Mutant Machines, navigate chaotic orange track, learn to work together and race to save their town! Note: Animated by Mercury Filmworks.
2	"The Skills to Thrill!"	Netflix	August 17, 2015
In the Skills to Thrill, the ultimate threat comes to Hot Wheels City—the end of driving! When Larry’s evil twin brother, Garry, comes to town proposing cars that not only drive themselves but will also make you pancakes on the way to work, everything seems great. But Garry has his eye set on something else altogether… the destruction of Hot Wheels City as revenge! Team Hot Wheels must prove they have what it takes to drive as a team and defeat Garry’s ultimate invention, the most epic supervillain yet… NitroBot! Join Team Hot Wheels in a race to save driving itself! Note: Animated by Titmouse.
3	"Search for the 5th Driver!"	YouTube	2015
Ride along in a choose-your-own-adventure driving challenge as you join Larry and the Team to look for the next skilled driver. Do you have the skills? Can you prove your speed, power, smarts and imagination? Will you choose wisely and conquer every insane obstacle in Hot Wheels City!? Click in to a Hot Wheels experience like never before, where YOU are in the driver’s seat! Are you the 5th member of Team Hot Wheels? Note: Animated by Titmouse.
4	"Build the Epic Race!"	Netflix	October 5, 2015
Hot Wheels City is preparing for the biggest, baddest race of all time, the Epic Race. Each member of Team Hot Wheels takes his turn building a section of this wild track; but then a gangly group of supervillains, the Road Pirates, roll into town intent on destroying the Epic Race and capturing Larry’s precious technology. Team Hot Wheels must go head-to-head with the Road Pirates in the fastest, wildest, stuntiest race to end all races, and to win they must complete the death-defying Spin Storm! Does Team Hot Wheels have the speed and guts to ace the Epic Race and save Hot Wheels City once and for all? Note: Animated by Titmouse.

== Reception ==
Writing for Common Sense Media, Renee Schonfeld praised the first film's character focus, comedy and animation and gave the film four stars out of five. Brian Costello, who reviewed the second and third films for the outlet, was far less positive, summing up both features as "nothing more than a 45-minute Hot Wheels commercial" and awarding them with a one star rating.

== See also ==
- Hot Wheels (1969–1971)
- Heroes on Hot Wheels (1991–1992)
- Hot Wheels: World Race (2002–2003)
- Hot Wheels: AcceleRacers (2004–2006)
- Hot Wheels Battle Force 5 (2009–2012)
- Hot Wheels Let's Race (2024–2026)
