= Sunburnt Unicorn =

- Film poster
- Directed by: Nick Johnson
- Screenplay by: Nick Johnson
- Produced by: Nick Johnson; Patrick Wilding
- Starring: Kathleen Barr; Tabitha St. Germain; Brian Drummond; Laara Sadiq; Diana Kaarina
- Edited by: Nick Johnson
- Music by: Tiffany Ayalik; Inuksuk Mackay
- Animation by: Brittany MacDonald
- Production company: 2448223 Alberta
- Distributed by: NMS Releasing
- Release date: June 10, 2024 (Annecy)
- Running time: 81 minutes
- Country: Canada
- Language: English

Sunburnt Unicorn is a Canadian animated feature film, directed by Nick Johnson and released in 2024. The film centres on Frankie, a young boy who is stranded in the desert after a car accident, and must travel through the strange and increasingly hallucinatory environment to try to find his father.

The voice cast includes Kathleen Barr, Tabitha St. Germain, Brian Drummond, Laara Sadiq and Diana Kaarina. The film's soundtrack was composed by PIQSIQ, an Inuit throat singing duo consisting of Tiffany Ayalik and Inuksuk Mackay.

The film premiered at the 2024 Annecy International Animation Film Festival, and had its Canadian premiere at the 28th Fantasia International Film Festival. It was also screened in competition at the 2024 Ottawa International Animation Festival.
