= Dr. Dimensionpants =

Canadian television series

- Also known as: Dr. Dimension Pants
- Genre: Superhero; Comedy
- Created by: Brad Peyton
- Directed by: Jon Izen
- Voices of: Samuel Vincent; Richard Ian Cox; Ian James Corlett
- Composers: Daniel Ingram; Caleb Chan; Trevor Hoffmann
- Country of origin: Canada
- Original language: English
- No. of seasons: 2
- No. of episodes: 26 (52 segments)

Production
- Executive producers: Brad Peyton; Steven DeNure; Michael Hirsh; Kirsten Newlands
- Producer: Elana Adair (S2)
- Running time: 22 minutes
- Production companies: DHX Media; The Factory Backwards Entertainment

Original release
- Network: Teletoon
- Release: November 6, 2014 – September 22, 2015

Dr. Dimensionpants is a Canadian animated television series created by Brad Peyton and produced by DHX Media and The Factory Backwards Entertainment. Originally set to launch in the winter of 2014 on Teletoon, the series instead premiered on November 6, 2014, as well as on Télétoon. The show is geared towards kids ages 7 to 11. 26 episodes were produced.

== Plot ==
Kyle Lipton was a normal 12-year-old kid, until a portal opened and dropped a pair of "The Dimensionpants", also called the 'Pants of Power' or 'Power Pants'. It is one of several powerful clothing items constructed in the Unicrone dimension, which also included socks, a summer dress, and a blazer. When he wears them, he becomes a new superhero called Dr. Dimensionpants. Now Kyle has all the superhero powers he ever wanted, along with responsibility. With the help of a talking unicorn named Philip, Dr. Dimensionpants learns his powers to save the dimensions, while dealing with normal kid issues.

== Characters ==
=== Main ===
- Kyle Bradley Lipton (voiced by Samuel Vincent) is a 12-year-old boy who is the latest to adopt the secret identity of Dr. Dimensionpants.
- Philiponius ("Philip") Chickpea (voiced by Richard Ian Cox) is Kyle's unicorn mentor and occasional sidekick. Prior to Kyle he had taught 37 others to serve in the role of Dr. Dimensionalpants, and is able to restrict access to their powers.

=== Lipton family ===
- Amanda Lipton (voiced by Kazumi Evans) is Kyle's younger sister who is a genius and has a blog on the web.
- Ann-Mary Lipton (voiced by Kathleen Barr) is the mother of Amanda and Kyle.
- Dunley Lipton (voiced by Brian Drummond) is the father of Amanda and Kyle. He would like to spend everyday only with his son, but Kyle is always busy with his superhero duties. Dunley loves Kyle very much, and so he does him.

=== School ===
- Liz Business (voiced by Kathleen Barr) is a barbell-lifting brunette with a scar across her eye. She secretly loves Kyle.
- Rebecca Stella (voiced by Shannon Chan-Kent) is a popular blonde that Kyle moons over who turns out to be the daughter of Glass Skull.
- Mr. Silverstein (voiced by Samuel Vincent) is Kyle's teacher.
- Dutch (voiced by Brian Drummond) is a recurring school bully. His dad is named Butch.
- Lennon (voiced by Andrew Francis) is the boy Rebecca likes.
- Dragon Master Paul is Kyle's blonde friend who likes roleplaying.

=== Villains ===
Head-themed:

- The Cortex (voiced by Ian James Corlett) is Dr. Dimensionpants's big-headed alien nemesis who seeks to steal the Dimensionpants to become powerful. Corlett also voices Motho Jr.
- Glass Skull (voiced by Brian Drummond) is another Dr. Dimensionpants's nemesis whom, as his name suggests, has a glass skull. Drummond also voices Dutch's dad Butch. He is the father of Rebecca Stella.

Roblins:

- Glug (voiced by Brian Drummond, who also does Merman #1)
- Slob (voiced by Noel Johansen, who also does Merman #2)

Wizards:

- Evil Wizard Murray (voiced by Trevor Devall) is Silas' brother.
- Evil Wizard Silas (voiced by Brian Dobson) is Murray's brother.

Others:

- Goody Gobbles is a human-eating turkey.
- Thora (voiced by Cathy Weseluck) is a Viking girl who hunts unicorns. She returns in "Viking Games" after debuting in an episode where she interrupts a party of fake unicorns.
- Underwater Man (voiced by Gabe Khouth, who also does Underwater Dad)
- Motho (voiced by Peter Kelamis, who also does Alien Referee)
- Destructocorn
- Wrongo Bongo

== Broadcast ==
Dr. Dimensionpants first premiered on Cartoon Network international channels in Poland on October 20, in Germany, the Benelux on October 27, 2014 and Latin America on June 3, 2015. The series has been sold to ABC in Australia. It premiered on Hulu on June 13, 2015 in the US. It premiered on Kix on July 23, 2016 in the UK.

== Episodes ==
=== Series overview ===
Season	Episodes	Originally released	
Season	Episodes	First released	Last released
1	14	November 6, 2014	June 16, 2015
2	12	June 23, 2015	September 22, 2015

=== Season 1 (2014–15) ===
No.	Title	Written by	Original air date (Teletoon)	Original air date (US)	
1	"Horn to Be Wild / Bravo Dimensionpants"	Betsy Walters, Mark Evestaff & Shawn Kalb	November 13, 2014	June 13, 2015 (US)	
2	"BBF Cortex / Bubble Trouble"	Shawn Kalb & Miles Smith	January 15, 2015	June 13, 2015 (US)	
3	"Dr. Dimensionpants Camp / Cupcakes at Large"	Shawn Kalb & Brad Peyton	January 18, 2015	June 13, 2015 (US)	
4	"I Tabby / Robo-Teddy"	Jeremy Winkels & Shawn Kalb	November 27, 2014	June 13, 2015 (US)	
5	"Showbiz Unicorn / My Pet Human"	Alan Resnick & Josh Saltzman	December 4, 2014	June 13, 2015 (US)	
6	"Best Christmas Yeti / Christmas Eve of Destruction"	Emer Connon & Scott Oleszkowicz	January 6, 2015	December 12, 2014 (US)	
7	"Poppacorn / Pranks-a-Lot" (Note: This episode first aired on November 3, 2014, in Germany and Austria.)	Shawn Kalb & Emmer Connon	January 13, 2015	June 13, 2015 (US)	
8	"Dr. Dimensionsocks / The Cortex in the Vortex" (Note: This episode first aired on November 4, 2014, in Germany and Austria.)	Betsy Walters & Emmer Connon	January 20, 2015	July 12, 2015 (US)	
9	"Evil Dad / Are You Ready to Oink?" (Note: This episode first aired on October 28, 2014, in Germany and Austria.)	Jeremy Winkels & Alan Resnick	November 6, 2014	June 13, 2015 (US)	
10	"In Yo' Face Dance / Cave Crasher" (Note: This episode first aired on October 29, 2014, in Germany and Austria.)	Evan Thaler Hickey & Miles Smith	January 27, 2015	June 13, 2015 (US)	
11	"How to Scam a Roblin / Fee, Fine, Foe"	Josh Saltzman & Evan Thaler Hickey	November 20, 2014	July 13, 2015 (US)	
12	"Air Dimensionpants / Dolly of Doom" (Note: This episode first aired on November 7, 2014, in Germany and Austria.)	Miles Smith	February 3, 2015	June 13, 2015 (US)	
13	"Viking Games / Is There a Doctor in This Dimension?" (Note: This episode first aired on November 11, 2014, in Germany and Austria.)	Josh Saltzman & Miles Smith	June 16, 2015	June 13, 2015 (US)	
14	"Dry Clean Only / Princess Perfectpants" (Note: This episode first aired on November 12, 2014, in Germany and Austria.)	Jon Izen	Andrew Harrison & Brad Peyton	June 16, 2015	June 13, 2015 (US)

=== Season 2 (2015) ===
No.	Title	Written by	Original air date (Teletoon)	Original air date (US)
15	"Unicrone Penalty Box / The Pink Feather"	Shawn Kalb & Miles Smith	June 23, 2015	June 13, 2015 (US)
16	"Get Smarter / Motho's Boy" (Note: This episode first aired in Australia.)	Andrew Harrison & Jeremy Winkels	June 30, 2015	June 13, 2015 (US)
17	"Horn Control / Level 7 Birthday Magician" (Note: This episode first aired in Australia.)	Shawn Kalb & Josh Saltzman	July 7, 2015	June 13, 2015 (US)
18	"Horsing Around / Dr. Conventionpants" (Note: This episode first aired in Australia.)	Craig Martin & Miles Smith	July 14, 2015	June 13, 2015 (US)
19	"Faster, Higher, Lazier / The Phantom Nuisance" (Note: This episode first aired in Australia.)	Shawn Kalb & Craig Martin	July 21, 2015	June 13, 2015 (US)
20	"Goody Gobbles / Los Luchadores Lipton" (Note: This episode first aired in Australia.)	Jeremy Winkels & Craig Martin	July 28, 2015	June 13, 2015 (US)
21	"Not So Secret Admirer / Catch And Release" (Note: This episode first aired on December 26, 2014, in Australia.)	Emer Connon & Scott Oleszkowicz	August 4, 2015	June 13, 2015 (US)
22	"Nice-Inator / Wrongo Bongo" (Note: This episode first aired on December 29, 2014, in Australia.)	Miles Smith & Craig Martin	December 11, 2014	June 13, 2015 (US)
23	"The Brainysitter / Sidekickn it" (Note: This episode first aired on December 31, 2014, in Australia.)	Brad Peyton & Miles Smith	August 11, 2015	June 13, 2015 (US)
24	"Destroy All Chores / Dimension Skirt" (Note: This episode first aired on January 1, 2015, in Australia.)	Miles Smith & Josh Saltzman	August 18, 2015	June 13, 2015 (US)
25	"Henchman N.O. 94 / The Lesser Evil" (Note: This episode first aired on January 2, 2015, in Australia.)	John Saltzman & Miles Smith	August 25, 2015	June 13, 2015 (US)
26	"Destructocom, Transform / Mentors Only" "Destructocorn Transform! / Menters Only" (Note: This episode will first air in Australia.)	Jeremy Winkels & John Saltzman	September 22, 2015	June 13, 2015 (US)

== Games ==
Web games that Teletoon made based on the show include:

1. FLYIN'
2. Power Pants Panic
