= Hot Wheels Battle Force 5 =

Animated sports science fiction series

- Series logo
- Genre: Sports (Auto racing): Science fiction; Drama
- Based on: Hot Wheels by Mattel
- Voices of: Kathleen Barr; Michael Dobson; Brian Drummond; Mark Hildreth; Noel Johansen; Alessandro Juliani; Gabe Khouth; Scott McNeil; Colin Murdock; Kira Tozer
- Theme music composer: Spaceman Music Productions
- Opening theme: "Hot Wheels Battle Force 5"
- Ending theme: "Hot Wheels Battle Force 5" (Instrumental)
- Composer: Brian Carson
- Countries of origin: United States; Canada
- Original language: English
- No. of seasons: 2
- No. of episodes: 52 (+1 movie)

Production
- Executive producers: Doug Murphy; Barry Waldo
- Producers: Ira Singerman; Irene Weibel; Tina Chow
- Running time: 22 minutes
- Production companies: Nelvana Limited; Mattel Entertainment; Nerd Corps Entertainment, Inc.

Original release
- Network: Teletoon (Canada); Cartoon Network (U.S.)
- Release: August 29, 2009 – November 21, 2012

Hot Wheels Battle Force 5 is an animated science fiction television series produced by Mattel, Nelvana, and Nerd Corps Entertainment, based on the Hot Wheels toy line by the American toy maker, Mattel which was introduced in 1968. A two-episode preview aired on Cartoon Network in the United States on August 24, 2009; it was shown on Cartoon Network India starting on April 30, 2010 and on Cartoon Network Philippines from July 3, 2010. The series made its official debut on August 29, 2009. According to a HotWheels.com page as of July 14, 2010 describing "BATTLE FORCE 5 Battle Action Assortment" toys, vehicles combine forces to create even more powerful combat machines. The second season began airing September 18, 2010.

While the series does not follow nor ever reference the events from the World Race or AcceleRacers franchises (with the exception of the character, Vert Wheeler, who appeared in both of the franchises), the series has no continuity with the toy line.

The first trailer for the series was released on the official Hot Wheels Battle Force 5 website on June 25, 2009. The first two episodes aired on Monday, August 24. This is the fourth series to be produced by Nerd Corps Entertainment (after League of Super Evil, Storm Hawks and Dragon Booster). 52 episodes and a 46-minute film were made.

== Plot ==
One day driving out in the Salt Flats, expert driver Vert Wheeler comes across a dimension called a Battle Zone where he meets a life form called a Sentient whose name is Sage. Together, they assemble a racing team equipped with state-of-the-art weaponized vehicles to compete against the robotic Sark and the animal-like Vandals in the Battle Zones for the devices that control the zones called Battle Keys to determine the fate of planet Earth.

Battle Force 5 lives on the planet Earth at Vert's garage/race circuit at a town called Handler's Corners. When tornado-like portals called Storm Shocks appear, they provide access to dimensions in the Multiverse called Battle Zones. All Battle Zones have a Battle Key that allows access to the home world of the ones who accessed the Zone through Storm Shocks. This obligates Battle Force 5 to secure the Keys before the Vandals or the Sark in prevention of the Vandals looting Earth and the Sark taking over Earth.

The Battle Zones were created by the Sentients. There are two types of Sentients: Blue and Red. The two types lived on two separate Homeworlds as rivals, until the blue homeworld was taken over by the Vandals. Throughout the story, Battle Force 5 encounter situations that make them access the Vandal, Sark, and Sentient homeworlds.

At the end of the second season, the Sentient war ends, and Krytus and his team are banished. The Blue and Red Sentients are united once again. However, Rawkus informs Battle Force 5 that the Ancient Ones have awakened.

Battle Force 5 has to challenge this new threat as well as the Alpha Code, of which Zemerik is under the influence, in the feature film "Total Revolution". The Ancient Ones are revealed to be called Karmordials who created the Sentients and were banished to the Primordiverse. They use a Shadow Matter bomb to get back, but Battle Force 5 eventually stops them. To conclude the series, with the Multiverse at peace, Vert, the rest of the team, and his dad are able to return to Earth without any looming threats.

== Episodes ==
=== Series overview ===
Season	Episodes	Originally released	
Season	Episodes	First released	Last released
1	26	August 24, 2009	May 14, 2010
2	26	September 18, 2010	July 16, 2011

=== Season 1 (2009–10) ===
No. overall	No. in season	Title	Directed by	Written by	Original release date	Original air date (Teletoon)	Prod. code
1	1	"Starting Line"	Johnny Darrell, George Samilski	Sean Jara	August 29, 2009	September 13, 2009	101
While driving in the Salt Flats, Vert Wheeler is drawn by a freak storm into an inter-dimensional Battle Zone. When he saves a blue senitent named Sage, his car is now a high tech weapon and he and his team become defenders of planet Earth.
2	2	"Gearing Up"	Johnny Darrell, Casey Burke Léonard	Steve Sullivan	August 29, 2009	September 13, 2009	102
With the Battle Force 5 together for the first time, Vert needs to learn leadership when they set out to retrieve a Mobi to keep Sage alive. In order to survive and overcome impossible odds, they must learn how to use their new vehicles!
3	3	"Common Cold War"	Johnny Darrell, Daniel Ife	Dan Pilditch, Steve Sullivan	September 5, 2009	September 27, 2009	103
Irritated by the team's eccentricities – especially Spinner's germaphobia – Agura struggles to keep her frustration in check. To make matters worse, Zemerik, the evil leader of The Sark, uses a technology called "Phase Metal" to seize control of the Tangler, and uses it against the team!
4	4	"Basic Training"	Johnny Darrell, George Samilski	Terry Saltsman, Sean Jara	September 12, 2009	October 4, 2009	104
After an accident happens to Vert in a Battle Zone, he decides that they need to train in a previously secured Zone. However, they discover that a Sark factory has been built, complete with an army of Zurk!
5	5	"Missing in Action"	Johnny Darrell, Clint Butler	Richard Clark	September 19, 2009	October 11, 2009	105
Feeling underappreciated by his teammates, Zoom acts brashly and is captured by the Vandals. The Battle Force 5 realize how capable he is when they go to rescue him and find the Vandals have underestimated the team's scout as well!
6	6	"Junkyard Dogged"	Johnny Darrell, Clint Butler	Tom Root	September 26, 2009	October 18, 2009	106
Lurking inside a giant Junk zone, a Battle Key is guarded by a mechanized Junkyard Dog. Spinner and Sherman are forced to join Kalus in order to survive! In doing so, the brothers learn to appreciate each other's skills.
7	7	"Behind Enemy Lines"	Johnny Darrell, Sebastian Brodin, George Samilski	Richard Clark	October 3, 2009	October 25, 2009	107
Vert is stranded on the Vandal planet and must survive being hunted by Kalus. Will the Battle Force 5 be able to save Vert in time?
8	8	"My Man, Zug"	Johnny Darrell, Blair Simmons	Andy Guerdat	October 10, 2009	November 1, 2009	108
Zemerik infiltrates the Battle Force 5 by reprogramming Zug to be Stanford's servant in order for Zug to steal the Battle Force 5's Battle Keys.
9	9	"Frenemy"	Johnny Darrell, Steve Sacks	Dan Pilditch	November 7, 2009	November 8, 2009	109
Stanford discovers that he's the descendant of a famed Multiverse explorer. This inspires him to challenge Battle Force 5's leadership structure and make a pact with the Vandals...but can they be trusted?
10	10	"Man Down"	Johnny Darrell, Rav Grewal	Dave Dias	November 14, 2009	November 15, 2009	110
When Zoom falls victim to Hatch's life-threatening neurotoxin, Battle Force 5 must race to Planet Vandal and retrieve the rare spotted pufferplant for the antidote. But the clock is ticking! Can Zoom hold on long enough?!
11	11	"Artificial Intelligence"	Johnny Darrell, Daniel Ife, George Samilski	Grant Suave	November 21, 2009	November 22, 2009	111
When information from a Sentient Data Log is accidentally downloaded into Zeke's brain, He leads Battle Force 5 into a secret Zone to find clues that may lead them to Sentient survivors. What Sentient information will be uncovered? Will the Sark get the information before the team can?!
12	12	"Double Down"	Johnny Darrell, Blair Simmons	Andrew Nicholls, Darrell Vickers	December 26, 2009	November 29, 2009	112
During a solar flare, something goes awry in the Multiverse and Battle Force 5 find themselves face-to-face with their evil doppelgangers! This anti-Battle Force 5 team is so nasty that our heroes must join together with an unlikely ally if they want to keep them away from Earth!
13	13	"The Chosen One"	Johnny Darrell, George Samilski	Doug Hadders, Adam Rotstein	January 2, 2010	December 6, 2009	113
One of Zoom's old friends, Zen, from the Order of the Flying Fists comes to see him and reveals to the others that Zoom was the "Chosen One", the one responsible to protect the Blue Flame, but he had abandoned the Order.
14	14	"StormShocker!"	Johnny Darrell, Rav Grewal	Sean Jara	January 30, 2010	January 10, 2010	114
Battle Force 5 must defend Zeke's Diner and...Stanford's brother!?...from the Sark when a part of Handler's Corners gets teleported into a Battle Zone.
15	15	"Cage Match"	Johnny Darrell, Steve Sacks	Matt Sheppo	February 6, 2010	January 17, 2010	115
Vert and Zoom must compete in a "Cage of Doom" against the Vandals while trying to outwit a Battle Zone with its own agenda.: Note: In this episode Vert takes control over the Chopper. A Sentient chip turns it yellow to red.
16	16	"Glitchin'"	Johnny Darrell, Blair Simmons	Grant Sauve	February 13, 2010	January 24, 2010	116
Zemerik captures Spinner and makes him play a driving simulation in order to study his brain so that he can upgrade the Zurk hive-mind! Meanwhile, Agura has a bad case of hiccups!
17	17	"Cold As Ice"	Johnny Darrell, Rav Grewal	Doug Molitor	February 20, 2010	February 21, 2010	117
After finding themselves in an Ice Battle Zone, they discover that the cold enables the Sark's computerized brains to work faster than ever! As a result, Agura and Stanford must put aside their rivalry to battle the hyper-accelerated Sark, a Sark Tangler, and a Yeti!
18	18	"Mag Wheels"	Johnny Darrell, Steve Sacks	Andy Guerdat	March 6, 2010	February 28, 2010	118
The team enters a Battle Zone that will give the Battle Key, but only if the Battle Force 5 can win it in a game of Battle Key Soccer. Things go really awry when the key, being reverse magnetic, ends up on planet Sark!
19	19	"Time Out"	Johnny Darrell, George Samilski	Shawn Kalb	March 26, 2010	March 7, 2010	119
Hatch uses a time-stopping device he built that will leave the portal open for a Vandal invasion and freeze time in Handler's Corners.
20	20	"Artifact Attack"	Johnny Darrell, Blair Simmons	Al Schwartz	April 2, 2010	April 4, 2010	120
Sherman and Spinner's new hobby turns dangerous when their artifact collection comes to life!
21	21	"Swarmed"	Johnny Darrell, Daniel Ife	Cole Bastedo, Matt Huether	April 9, 2010	April 11, 2010	121
Vert is trapped inside a giant nest of mechanical wasps, and Stanford must lead Battle Force 5 to keep the Vandals from reaching Earth while figuring a way to get Vert out before it's too late...
22	22	"Gladiators"	Johnny Darrell, Logan McPherson	Robin Stein	April 16, 2010	April 18, 2010	122
The Battle Force 5 and the Vandals are forced to fight against each other in a Battle Zone run by a deranged Red Sark named Tors-10.
23	23	"Spinning Out"	Johnny Darrell, Clint Butler	Cole Bastedo, Matt Huether	April 23, 2010	May 23, 2010	123
Stanford gets a hard lesson about self-reliance as the Battle Force 5 must stabilize the Cycloid Zone to prevent the Multiverse from collapsing. However, a swarm of energy leeches prove to be a considerable obstacle, as they can drain energy from their vehicles and equipment.
24	24	"Mobi 3.0."	Johnny Darrell, George Samilski	Andrew Nicholls, Darrell Vickers	April 30, 2010	May 30, 2010	124
When Sage needs to be updated, she is taken to a Battle Zone in the Mobi. But while downloading new files, the team encounters Zemerik, who is trying to take control of both Sage and the Mobi.
25	25	"Axis of Evil Part 1"	Johnny Darrell, Daniel Ife	Steve Sullivan	May 7, 2010	June 6, 2010	125
With Sage running on reserve power, the Battle Force 5 must find a way to recharge her. The Vandals and Sark form an alliance and get to Earth. After Sage is recharged, she decides that the team must destroy the Battle Keys, rather than let the enemy have them. They instead bind together and form a portal that leads them to the Blue Sentient planet.
26	26	"Axis of Evil Part 2"	Johnny Darrell, Logan McPherson	Sean Jara	May 14, 2010	June 6, 2010	126
Picking up from last episode, the Battle Force 5 fight the Vandals and the Sark for Sage. Zemerik forms an alliance with Battle Force 5, in hopes of getting home. Sage's memory is restored, but her evil Red Sentient twin brother, Krytus, is released from the Krypt Zone by his Diad minion Praxion. Zemerik and Vert save each other from Krytus, but Zemerik sacrifices himself to save Battle Force 5. Zemerik and Zug were not destroyed by Krytus, but are being held as prisoners.

=== Season 2: Fused (2010–11) ===
No. overall	No. in season	Title	Directed by	Written by	Original release date	Original air date (Teletoon)	Prod. code
27	1	"Ascent of the Red Sentients Part 1"	Johnny Darrell, Logan McPherson	Sean Jara	September 18, 2010	January 9, 2011	201
Picking up from the first season finale, Krytus begins the search for his teammates.
28	2	"Ascent of the Red Sentients Part 2"	Johnny Darrell, George Samilski	Steve Sullivan	September 25, 2010	January 16, 2011	202
Krytus frees the rest of his Red Sentient team and the Battle Force 5 must master the fusion process in order to defeat the Red Sentient 5.
29	3	"Battleship 5"	Johnny Darrell, Clint Butler	Steve Sullivan	October 2, 2010	January 23, 2011	203
The Battle Force 5 search a Mobi wreck for important Sentient Data Logs. The problem is that the wreck is at the bottom of the Vandal ocean.
30	4	"Uprising"	Johnny Darrell, Daniel Ife	Al Schwartz	October 9, 2010	January 30, 2011	204
A new Vandal shows up and challenges Kalus for the title of Vandal Warlord: Grimian!
31	5	"The Power of Resistance"	Johnny Darrell, Clint Butler	Steve Sullivan	October 16, 2010	February 6, 2011	205
Battle Force 5 learn from Zemerik that there is a rebellion against the Red Sentients on one of the Red Sentient moons.
32	6	"The Crimson One"	Johnny Darrell, Daniel Ife	Story by : Sean Jara; Teleplay by : Daniel Williams, Lienne Sawatsky, Casey Burke Léonard & Tom Root	October 23, 2010	February 13, 2011	206
The team have to search for and destroy the Double-Helix Crystals before Krytus uses them to unfreeze the entire red Sentient civilization! Stanford must overcome his insecurity whenever he fails, and Vert learns that he plays an important role in a Blue and Red Sentient legend called the "Crimson One".
33	7	"Spawn Hunters"	Johnny Darrell, Andrew Duncan, Logan McPherson	Shawn Kalb	November 20, 2010	February 20, 2011	207
The Battle Force 5 decide to hunt down the Red Sentients' Re-Spawn Chambers, and capture Kytren's essence. Tezz must overcome his arrogance as Sage deals with Stanford's superstition.
34	8	"Found!...And Lost"	Johnny Darrell, Andrew Duncan, Clint Butler, George Samilski	Al Schwartz	November 27, 2010	February 27, 2011	208
When the team escapes into a desolate zone, they discover a Diad named Quardian collecting Blue Sentient shells. But when Quardian is captured by a pursuing Kyburi, they must rescue him from the Red Sentient homeworld before the Reds learn of his mission.
35	9	"Deep Freeze"	Johnny Darrell, Andrew Duncan, Michael Dowding	Story by : Sean Jara; Teleplay by : Lienne Sawatsky & Daniel Williams	December 4, 2010	March 6, 2011	209
The team must locate a terraforming device which could restore Blue Sentient civilization, and the Ice Zone it's in prompts Vert to bring in a new recruit and best friend.
36	10	"Lord of the Kharamanos"	Johnny Darrell, Andrew Duncan, Daniel Ife	Hugh Duffy	December 11, 2010	March 13, 2011	210
The Battle Force 5 search for a way into the Red Sentient Homeworld, only to end up on the Vandal homeworld. Tezz learns compassion and to be more of a team player, as he and Vert discover the Vandals' most important secret: their vehicles are being built by an enslaved race of super-engineers.
37	11	"Fusion Confusion"	Johnny Darrell, Andrew Duncan, Logan McPherson	Al Schwartz	January 29, 2011	March 20, 2011	211
When a freak accident causes Sherman and Grimian to switch minds, the Battle Force 5 must rescue Sherman from the Vandal home world and switch them back before Grimian relays Earth's coordinates to Krytus.
38	12	"Mouth of the Dragon"	Johnny Darrell, Andrew Duncan, Clint Butler	Scott Albert	February 5, 2011	March 25, 2011	212
Battle Force 5 must enlist the aid of the Order of the Flying Fists to drive the Red Sentients away from Earth. Zoom's former master is more than what he seems.
39	13	"Full Throttle"	Johnny Darrell, Andrew Duncan, Michael Dowding	Adam Higgs	February 12, 2011	April 1, 2011	213
To prevent Krytus from locating Sage, Battle Force 5 enlist the aid of pro racer and 2005 Indianapolis 500 winner Dan Wheldon in order to destroy the scanner that's being used to search the Multiverse.
40	14	"Stone Cold Warrior"	Johnny Darrell, Andrew Duncan, Daniel Ife	Steve Sullivan	February 19, 2011	August 13, 2013	214
Battle Force 5 meet Rawkus, a huge dude responsible for maintaining the balance of the Multiverse. Can Zoom gain his trust when the Red Sentients steal his Power Core Stone?
41	15	"The Shadow Zone"	Johnny Darrell, Andrew Duncan, Logan McPherson	Ken Cuperus	February 26, 2011	August 13, 2013	215
Rawkus brings Vert and Zoom to the Shadow Zone to find the lost minds of the Blue Sentients. The key, however, lies within Sage.
42	16	"Hunt for the Magmatrox"	Johnny Darrell, Andrew Duncan, Clint Butler	Shawn Kalb	March 5, 2011	August 13, 2013	216
The Battle Force 5 must find and rescue the legendary and nearly extinct Magmatrox before the Red Sentients hunt it for its horn!
43	17	"Sol Survivor"	Johnny Darrell, Andrew Duncan, Michael Dowding	Amy Benham	April 16, 2011	August 13, 2013	217
The Battle Force 5 race against time to save Kytren's Blue Sentient twin, Sol.
44	18	"The Blue Tide"	Johnny Darrell, Andrew Duncan, Daniel Ife	Lienne Sawatsky; Daniel Williams	April 23, 2011	August 13, 2013	218
Under the pretense of stopping Krytus from destroying the Blue Sark, the Battle Force 5 ally with Zemerik on a mission to an ancient Sark Factory. However, Zemerik has other plans for the factory. Meanwhile, a lightning strike permanently fuses the Buster and Tangler.
45	19	"Legacy"	Johnny Darrell, Andrew Duncan, Logan McPherson, Blair Simmons	Andrew Nicholls; Darrell Vickers	April 30, 2011	August 13, 2013	219
Vert is reunited with his long-lost father. After catching up on their relationship, he leads the Battle Force 5 to a Red Sentient Mobi constructed by Tors-10 in the Colosseum Zone.
46	20	"Shadow Runners"	Johnny Darrell, Andrew Duncan, Barry Karnowski, Clint Butler	Story by : Sean Jara; Teleplay by : Josh Gal	May 7, 2011	August 14, 2013	220
Vert gets trapped in the Shadow Zone with Krytus and the two are forced to work together to get out! If not, Krytus' Antimatter will mix with the Shadow matter in the Shadow Zone and the entire Multiverse will be destroyed.
47	21	"Blast from the Past"	Johnny Darrell, Andrew Duncan, Michael Dowding	Hugh Duffy	May 14, 2011	August 14, 2013	221
The Battle Force 5 are transported 1,000,000 years back to the Sentients's distant past! Not only must they battle their way back home in an ancient gladiatorial game, but they must make certain history unfolds the way it was originally supposed to.
48	22	"Grimian's Secret"	Andrew Duncan, Daniel Ife	Al Schwartz	June 18, 2011	August 14, 2013	222
The Battle Force 5 learn of Grimian's alliance with Krytus. Meanwhile, Tezz's scientific curiosity gets him captured by the Vandals.
49	23	"Better Off Red"	Andrew Duncan, Blair Simmons	Story by : Ken Cuperus; Teleplay by : Andrew Nicholls & Darrell Vickers	June 25, 2011	August 14, 2013	223
Vert must work with Krytus to prevent Sage from creating a doomsday device that will end the Multiverse! But is this really the truth? The secret to the Red Sentients' Re-Spawn technology is revealed.
50	24	"Get Zemerik"	Andrew Duncan, Barry Karnowski	Grant Sauvé	July 2, 2011	August 14, 2013	224
Pursued by the Red Sentients, Zemerik and Zug flee to the Torborian Badlands. The Battle Force 5 need to collect Zemerik's command codes which Sage can use to create a super virus that will mean the end of the Sark. However, the Red Sentients are not the only ones the BF5 must deal with, as they encounter the inhabitants of the badlands.
51	25	"Rumble in the Jungle"	Andrew Duncan, Michael Dowding	Ken Cuperus	July 9, 2011	August 14, 2013	225
When the Vandals attack the Kharamanos homeworld, the Battle Force 5 must stop them once and for all as Kalus and Grimian fight for control of the Vandals!
52	26	"Unite and Strike!"	Andrew Duncan, Daniel Ife	Sean Jara	July 16, 2011	August 15, 2013	226
The war with the Red Sentients comes to its climax, as Krytus unfreezes the Red Sentient population by releasing a beta decay wave from a destroyed Battle Zone. At the same time, the Blue Sentient shells are rediscovered as the BF5 attempt to revive the Blue Sentient race.

== Home media ==
Season 1, Volume 1 of Hot Wheels Battle Force 5 was released by Warner Home Video on DVD on February 16, 2010. Volume 2 was released on June 8, 2010, and Volume 3 on December 7, 2010. Season 2 was released on DVD by Cinedigm in late 2014.

== Awards ==
In 2010, Battle Force 5 was nominated for the 37th Daytime Emmy Awards in Sound Editing, Sound Mixing, and Music Direction/Composition. The Battle Force 5 marketing team also won three awards in the Web Marketing Association's 2010 Internet Advertising Competition. They won for "Best Toy & Hobby Online ad," "Best TV Online ad," "Best of Show Online ad.".

== See also ==
- Hot Wheels (1969–1971)
- Heroes on Hot Wheels (1991–1992)
- Hot Wheels: World Race (2003)
- Hot Wheels: AcceleRacers (2005–2006)
- Team Hot Wheels (2014–2017)
- Hot Wheels Let's Race (2024-2025)
