= Hot Wheels: AcceleRacers =

2005 animated series

- The DVD box art of the film Hot Wheels: AcceleRacers – The Speed of Silence.
- Created by: Mark Edens; Ian Richter (based on Hot Wheels by Mattel)

Films and television
- Films: Hot Wheels: AcceleRacers – Ignition; Hot Wheels: AcceleRacers – The Speed of Silence; Hot Wheels: AcceleRacers – Breaking Point; Hot Wheels: AcceleRacers – The Ultimate Race

Hot Wheels: AcceleRacers is a 2005 series of four animated films produced by Canadian company Mainframe Entertainment, which also produced the television series ReBoot. Available on DVD and VHS, it has also been shown on Cartoon Network.

The film series takes place in the same continuity as the 1969 animated series. A sequel to the 2003 film Hot Wheels: World Race, the series takes place two years after the World Race in California and puts Mattel's Hot Wheels toy cars in a ReBoot-like situation. The films were distributed by Warner Bros. Television and the soundtrack was distributed by Sony BMG. A collectible card game, which was shown in the DVD bonus, and other merchandise were also made.

The series aired on Cartoon Network in 2005–2006 in the following sequence: Ignition (January 8), The Speed of Silence (March 19), Breaking Point (June 25) and The Ultimate Race (October 1).

== Plot ==
Two years after the end of the World Race, Dr. Peter Tezla continues to study the information he gathered on the Wheel of Power while it was in his possession. However, he finds that Gelorum has returned fully repaired, now with her army of Racing Drones and is attempting to steal the Wheel of Power again. Tezla enters Highway 35 himself and attempts to stop Gelorum but fails and is greatly injured as the Drones capture the Wheel. He manages to escape back to Earth, and the Drones turn Hot Wheels City into their new headquarters.

Meanwhile, in present-day California, former World Race drivers Vert Wheeler, Kurt Wylde, Taro Kitano, and Mark Wylde have now become members of two street racing teams: the Teku, a team themed around import scene culture, and the Metal Maniacs, who are themed around Muscle Car and Hot Rod culture. During a grudge race on the coastline, Dr. Tezla's robotic assistant Gig appears, telling the World Race drivers that Dr. Tezla needs their help. Arriving at Dr. Tezla’s old base from the World Race, with some of their new teammates, they find it partially destroyed. Former Dune Ratz driver Brian Kadeem appears and takes them to the AcceleDrome, Dr. Tezla's new base. After the drivers arrive, Dr. Tezla appears on a large hologram in the middle of the cavern and tells them what he has found: new Acceleron knowledge from the Wheel of Power's research. Now that the Wheel has been taken from its spire in Highway 35, the Drones have control over the dimension’s portals.

Each of the symbols on the Wheel represents one of the Racing Realms, inter-dimensional worlds that have tracks that go through a single element in the hardest way possible for driving conditions (there are only fifteen Realms in the series, twelve that were actually shown and three that the Drones had already completed before the beginning of the series, but only the AcceleChargers from those three are shown). The Drones have been entering the Realms, and each time a Realm is finished, the first driver to reach the end of the track obtains an AcceleCharger, which gives a car the ability to drive through any condition that relates to the realm that it was won in. Discovering that the Wheel hologram is always in sync with the actual Wheel, it functions as an inter-dimensional portal to the Racing Realms (it should also be noted that the Drones have their own Wheel hologram portal as well, due to them capturing the actual Wheel). The drivers enter the realms to try to stop the Drones but find it harder than the World Race because the Wheel itself decides when to open the Realms and that each Realm only stays open for one hour with no way out but the finish line.

As the race to stop the Drones rages on, drivers are trapped in the Realms, grudges between the teams grow, and a new enemy force known as the Silencerz appears, attempting to defeat both the Drones and the humans with the same Wheel hologram technology that the other drivers currently share. As the race to stop the Drones reaches its end, the secret of the Acceleron's test comes to unveil itself: the Racing Realms were designed to create "the perfect driver" and the AcceleChargers were created as keys to having the Wheel of Power open a portal to the Acceleron home world.

== Cast ==
- Andrew Francis as Vert Wheeler
- Brian Drummond as Kurt Wylde
- Kevan Ohtsji as Taro Kitano
- Will Sanderson as Mark Wylde
- Adrian Holmes as Tork Maddox
- Dexter Bell as Nolo Pasaro
- Lisa Ann Beley as Karma Eiss
- Kirby Morrow as Shirako Takamoto
- Andrew Duncan as Mitchell "Monkey" McClurg
- David Kaye as Deezel "Pork Chop" Riggs
- Venus Terzo as Lani Tam
- Cusse Mankuma as Brian Kadeem
- Kasper Michaels as GIG
- Michael Donovan as Dr. Peter Tezla
- Kathleen Barr as Gelorum
- John Payne as Major Jack Wheeler
- Craig Veroni as Tone Pasaro
- Mark Oliver as RDL1, RDL2, RDL3 & RDL4

== Films ==
Occupation	Films			
Occupation	Ignition	The Speed of Silence	Breaking Point	The Ultimate Race
Director(s)	Andrew Duncan; Gino Nichele	Andrew Duncan; William Gordon	William Lau	Andrew Duncan
Producer(s)	Ian Richter; Gio Corsi	Ian Richter; Gio Corsi	Ian Richter	Ian Richter
Writer(s)	Screenplay by Mark Edens; Story by Mark Edens; Ian Richter	Mark Edens	Mark Edens	Mark Edens
Composer(s)	Brian Carson	Brian Carson	Brian Carson	Brian Carson
Production company(s)	Mattel Entertainment; Mainframe Entertainment	Mattel Entertainment; Mainframe Entertainment	Mattel Entertainment; Mainframe Entertainment	Mattel Entertainment; Mainframe Entertainment
Distributor	Warner Home Video	Warner Home Video	Warner Home Video	Warner Home Video
Released	January 8, 2005	March 19, 2005	June 25, 2005	October 1, 2005
Runtime	60 minutes			

== See also ==
- Hot Wheels (1969–1971)
- Heroes on Hot Wheels (1991–1992)
- Hot Wheels: World Race (2002–2003)
- Hot Wheels Battle Force 5 (2009–2011)
- Team Hot Wheels (2014–2017)
- Hot Wheels Let's Race (2024–2026)
