= Laura Drummond =

Canadian voice actress

- Born: Uranium City, Saskatchewan, Canada
- Occupation: Actress
- Years active: 1999–present
- Spouse: Brian Drummond (m. 1992)
- Children: 3

Laura Drummond is a Canadian actress. She is the wife of Brian Drummond and is a co-founder of the Urban Academy school based in New Westminster.

== Personal life ==
She has been married to voice actor Brian Drummond since 1992; together, they have a son and two daughters, Aidan (born 1995), Brynna (born 1997, pronounced BRIN-ah) and Ashlyn.

== Filmography ==
=== Animation ===
- Fantastic Four: World's Greatest Heroes — Courtney Bonner-Davis
- Strawberry Shortcake: Berry in the Big City — Crabapple Jam

=== Live action ===
- Stargate: SG-1 — Security Guard
- Love Under the Olive Tree — Gloria Cabella
- Riverdale — Mrs. Button (Episode: "Chapter Thirty-Seven: Fortune and Men's Eyes")
- Superman & Lois — Sandra Vance (Episode "Tried and True")

=== Dubbing roles ===
==== Animation ====
- Mobile Suit Gundam Seed Destiny — Shinn's Mother, Sarah
- Starship Operators — Imari Kamiya
- The Little Prince — Turquoise in "The Planet of Ludokaa" arc
