= Fat Dog Mendoza =

American television series

- Genre: Comedy; Animated; Fantasy
- Created by: Scott Musgrove
- Developed by: Ralph Soll; Scott Musgrove
- Written by: Scott Musgrove; Michael Ryan
- Voices of: Kathleen Barr; Erin Fitzgerald; Mark Acheson
- Theme music composer: Scott Musgrove; Kurt Liebert
- Opening theme: "Fat Dog Mendoza"
- Ending theme: "Fat Dog Mendoza" (Instrumental)
- Composer: Nathan Wang
- Countries of origin: Germany; United Kingdom; United States
- Original language: English
- No. of seasons: 2
- No. of episodes: 26

Production
- Executive producers: Finn Arnesen (for Cartoon Network Europe); Carole Weitzman (for TMO-Loonland)
- Producers: Scott Musgrove; Larry Houston; Fred Miller
- Running time: 30 minutes
- Production companies: TMO-Loonland Film GmbH; Sunbow Entertainment; Sony Wonder
- Budget: £375,000 (per episode)

Original release
- Network: Cartoon Network UK
- Release: February 28, 2000 – 2001

Fat Dog Mendoza is an animated television series produced by Sunbow Entertainment, Sony Wonder, and TMO-Loonland. The series is loosely based on a Dark Horse one-off comic book of the same name. The first Cartoon Network Europe co-production, it premiered on Cartoon Network UK on February 28, 2000.

== Premise ==
The show centers on a smart-mouthed dog who is incredibly obese, so much to the point that he is ball-shaped with small, stubby legs. Other characters include Little Costumed Buddy, Piranha Mae, and Onion Boy. The group fights crime in the fictional neighborhood of "Neighbourhood X". They try to fight for justice, but they often fail humorously.

== Main characters ==
- Fat Dog Mendoza (voiced by Mark Acheson) – The main protagonist. He is a massively obese dog who is smart, and solves problems with Buddy.
- Little Costumed Buddy (voiced by Kathleen Barr) – Fat Dog's best friend. A boy who loves pretending to be a hero and wants to be a real one someday. In one instance when Fat Dog teaches him how to bowl, he accidentally calls him "Little Costumed Danny")
- Piranha Mae (voiced by Erin Fitzgerald) – Buddy's best friend.
- Cruddy McFearson (voiced by Brian Drummond) – Buddy's bully.
- Onion Boy (voiced by Ian James Corlett) – A friend and classmate of Buddy.
- Doctor Rectangle (voiced by Peter Kelamis) – Buddy's nemesis.
- Polly-Esther (voiced by Teryl Rothery and Pauline Newstone, respectively) – Buddy's teachers and neighbours who are siamese twins. Despite having a single body, her two heads are separate in personality and opinions.

== Voice cast ==
- Mark Acheson as Fat Dog Mendoza
- Kathleen Barr as Little Costumed Buddy/Gigantic Robot/Union Leader/Spanish Senorita/A recorded operator/Old Woman Operator/
- Erin Fitzgerald as Piranha Mae/a Woman in line/On-Screen Date
- Brian Drummond as Cruddy McFearson/Pimple faced worker/Ham Sandwich/Shephard
- Norma MacMillan as Mom Rectangle
- Peter Kelamis as Doc Rectangle/Jimmy
- Ian James Corlett as Onion Boy/Agreeable Lad/The Elder/Architect/Turkey/Ranch Hand/Waiter/Eskimo/a Monkey/Tortilla Baby/Veterarian Doc/Yogi/Toad
- Pauline Newstone as Esther
- Teryl Rothery as Polly
- Phil Hayes as Hamperman/Right Sock Puppet/Paco/The Musgrovite/The Elder/Recorded Promo Voice
- French Tickner as Old Grandpappy Buddy
- Paul Dobson as Brett/Brett Sock Puppet/a Brethren/Sal Big Fish/Super Salesman
- Nicole Oliver as Laura Sock Puppet/Brenda/Marry/A female reporter/Robot Baby/An Alien
- Dale Wilson as Power Plus Man/Recorded Message voice/Gladiator Foreman/The Swoosh/Pops/a Man/The Toad
- Garry Chalk as Brutus/a Painter/Interpreter X/
- Don Brown as Caesar/a Narrator/Henchman
- Long John Baldry as the Golden Volcano God
- Scott McNeil as Bus Driver/Golphing Buddy/Handyman/Old Man/Pee Wee "Chili" Bottoms/Matthews/Lab Guy
- David Kaye as a Spokesperson/Matt/Big Al/A Pterodactyl/An Announcer/P.A./Stan "The Hand" Tubbs
- Terry Klassen as Texas Harry/Mike/Monkey/Old Monkey/Precious/Swarmy Reporter/Pilot/An Ambulance Medic/Mr. Omnipotent/a Man/Ham Man/Young Nerd
- Jay Brazeau as Boss/Gus
- Brent Miller as a Man
- Gerard Plunkett as Nelson
- Chantal Strand as Uncas
- Lee Tockar as Curator/A Triceratops/Car Thief/a Clerk/An Alien/
- Colin Murdock as a T-Rex
- John Payne as Aviminus/Buck Mulligan
- Sam Vincent as Cruddy McPhearson (in one episode)
- Wally Marsh as Professor Quadruped
- Andrea Libman as Mavis
- Jay Brazeau as Old Man X
- Shirley Milliner as Mrs. Big Feet
- Christopher Gaze as Skinny Boyle Esquire
- Cameron Lane as Mr. Johnson
- Jim Byrnes as Dan Fantastic
- Jason Gray-Stanford as Teen Robot Guy
- Michael Dobson as a Host
- Doug Parker as Dave the Dung Beetle/Carl Nussbalm/Patron Arnie/
- Babz Chula as Thelma Fine
- Tabitha St. Germain as Drama Girl/an Operator/Tough Chick/a Woman
- Maxine Miller as Lady Liberty
- Fran Dowie as The Balloonist
- Don McKay as Steamed Man
- Collin Murdoch as Secret Government Man
- Saffron Henderson as Gothic Girl/Cissy Poole

== Development ==
Development for the series began in March 1994, when Sunbow explored producing a show based on the one-shot comic. For many years, it remained on Sunbow's development slate as the studio classified it as a "Raw" property due to it only existing as a one-shot comic.

In December 1997, production for the series started with the completion of the preliminary bible for the series to convert the adult nature of the comic into a kids property, and to retain the qualities of the characters. Sunbow began to ship the show off to other companies as a co-production deal, who were mainly impressed with the Little Costume Buddy character.

In March 1998, Sunbow began to find a European partner for the series, which they found Cartoon Network Europe as broadcaster and TMO-Loonland as co-producer. The former noticing the show could appeal to the European audience, and the latter being that their unique animation style would work for a series like Fat Dog Mendoza. By September, both companies signed in September 1998, with TMO-Loonland's signing allowing the series to fulfill European content requirements. The funding for the series was split for 50% by Sunbow, 35% by TMO-Loonland, and 10%–15% by Cartoon Network Europe. It also allowed Cartoon Network Europe to fulfill their two-production deal with Sunbow, with fellow show The Cramp Twins filling the other half.

By 1999, the production was confirmed for an Early-2000 delivery from Cartoon Network Europe, who would hold first-run rights to the series.

== List of episodes ==
=== Season 1 ===
No. overall	No. in season	Title	Written by	Original release date
1	1	"Bright Side of the Moon"	Written by : Ralph Soll; Storyboarded by : Art Mawhinney, Jay Oliva, Hank Tucker	TBA
Little Costumed Buddy is bored, so Fat Dog takes him on an adventure through the moon.
2	2	"Forgotten Fat Dog"	Written by : Scott Musgrove, Michael Ryan; Storyboarded by : Armando Carrillo, Hector Carrillo, John Delaney, Art Mawhinney	TBA
Old Grandpappy Buddy comes to visit and gives Little Costume Buddy a brand new Dog. Fat Dog however, gets jealous and suspicious of "Brett", and discovers that he could be a fraud.
3	3	"Power Play"	Written by : Frank Santopadre, Ralph Soll; Storyboarded by : Ian Freedman, Steve Remen, Hank Tucker	TBA
Little Costumed Buddy doesn't seem that happy at being a superhero without super powers. Fat Dog takes him to the Secret Hidden Fortress of the Crime Fighter's League, but he has competition with other super-less superheroes.
4	4	"Et Tu, Fat Dog?"	Written by : Scott Musgrove, Michael Ryan, Gordon Bressack; Storyboarded by : John Ahern, Ian Freedman, Mike Kazaleh	TBA
It's Fat Dog's birthday, and Little Costumed Buddy takes him to an all-you-can-eat restaurant with live entertainment. However, they soon find out they're the ones part of it!
5	5	"Going the Distance"	Written by : Timothy J. Madison; Storyboarded by : Armando Carrillo, Hector Carrillo, Chad Hicks, Chris McCulloch	TBA
Fat Dog realises that Little Costumed Buddy gets too caught up on his projects, so to get him out of it, he takes him on an exhibition around Neighbourhood X.
6	6	"An Onion a Day"	Written by : Michael Ryan; Story by : Scott Musgrove, Michael Ryan, Ralph Soll; Storyboarded by : Dave Concepcion, Art Mawhinney, Steve Remen, Hank Tucker	TBA
Onion Boy is accused of stealing a museum antique. He must go to the Land of the Dinosaurs to pick up a new one he has "broken".
7	7	"Gone Today, Gone Tomorrow"	Written by : Scott Musgrove, Michael Ryan, Ralph Soll; Storyboarded by : Armando Carrillo, Hector Carrillo, Mike Kazaleh, Hank Tucker	TBA
A power outage is sending the houses going out one by one. Little Costumed Buddy and Fat Dog are in on the case.
8	8	"The Heart of Fat Dog"	Written by : Scott Musgrove, Michael Ryan; Story by : Darick Chamberlin, Scott Musgrove, Michael Ryan; Storyboarded by : Armando Carrillo, Hector Carrillo, Chad Hicks, Chris McCulloch	TBA
When a living Piggy Bank thinks that Fat Dog is laughing at him, it runs away. However, when Little Costumed Buddy discovers Fat Dog has gone missing as well, he goes on an adventure with Piranha Mae and Onion Boy to find Fat Dog.
9	9	"Superboots"	Written by : Scott Musgrove, Shawn Wolfe, Michael Udesky; Story by : Scott Musgrove, Shawn Wolfe; Storyboarded by : Dave Concepcion, Chad Hicks, and Steve Remen	TBA
A new brand of speed-increasing boots has released into shops, and Little Costumed Buddy thinks they could be great. He and Fat Dog find jobs to participate in, but realize they have a rival on their hands when Doc Rectangle is after them as well.
10	10	"Fat Dog Strikes Back"	Written by : Scott Musgrove, Michael Ryan; Story by : Michael Ryan; Storyboarded by : Armando Carrillo, Hector Carrillo	TBA
The Bald Moose Lodge hits Neighbourhood X. Fat Dog realises something must be up when Little Costumed Buddy is sucked into their world.
11	11	"Four Feet Deep"	Written by : Scott Musgrove, Michael Ryan; Story by : Scott Musgrove, Michael Ryan, Ralph Soll; Storyboarded by : Armando Carrillo, Hector Carrillo, Don Manuel, Steve Remen	TBA
Little Costumed Buddy and Fat Dog accidentally fall to the center of the Earth, and Piranha Mae must try and get them out before it's too late. Meanwhile, Fat Dog and Little Costumed Buddy have to deal with a new villain and attempt to foil his plans.
12	12	"Citizen 'X'"	Written by : Scott Musgrove, Michael Ryan; Story by : Scott Musgrove, Michael Ryan, Ralph Soll; Storyboarded by : Dave Bennett, Armando Carrillo, Hector Carrillo, John Delaney	TBA
Old Man X wants to move the Himalayan Mountains nearer to his backyard – or more or less, all on Neighbourhood X. Little Costumed Buddy and Fat Dog must find a way to make him change his mind.
13	13	"Built Free"	Written by : Scott Musgrove, Michael Ryan; Storyboarded by : Armando Carrillo, Hector Carrillo, Chad Hicks, Steve Remen	TBA
Fat Dog convinces Little Costumed Buddy to keep a small baby Robot. However when it grows, the two realise they need to return it where it was.

=== Season 2 ===
No. overall	No. in season	Title	Written by	Original release date
14	1	"Exposing Fat Dog"	Written by : Scott Musgrove, Peter Egan; Storyboarded by : Gibbs Lee, Ali Woodruff	TBA
15	2	"Hot Dog Mendoza!"	Written by : Scott Musgrove, Shawn Wolfe, Michael Ryan; Story by : Scott Musgrove, Shawn Wolfe; Storyboarded by : John Ahern, Dave Bennett, John Delaney, Eduardo Olivares, Steve Remen	TBA
16	3	"World Destruction; Weekend!!!"	Written by : Randolph Heard; Story by : Randolph Heard, Scott Musgrove, Michael Ryan, Shawn Wolfe; Storyboarded by : Dave Bennett, Don Manuel, Steve Remen	TBA
17	4	"Curses, Fat Dog!"	Written by : Ben Townsend; Story by : Ben Townsend, Scott Musgrove, Michael Ryan; Storyboarded by : Armando Carrillo, Hector Carrillo	TBA
18	5	"The Ghosts of Lane 13"	Written by : Shawn Wolfe, Michael Ryan; Story by : Scott Musgrove, Shawn Wolfe, Michael Ryan; Storyboarded by : Ben Edlund, Ian Freedman, Don Manuel, Art Mawhinney, Hank Tucker	TBA
19	6	"Sell, Sell, Sell!!!"	Written by : Scott Musgrove, Michael Ryan; Storyboarded by : Ian Freedman, Art Mawhinney, Steve Remen	TBA
20	7	"Sunken Heroes"	Written by : Randolph Heard, Scott Musgrove with Michael Ryan; Story by : Michael Ryan; Storyboarded by : Armando Carrillo, Hector Carrillo	TBA
21	8	"Substitute Fat Dog"	Written by : Scott Musgrove, Michael Ryan; Storyboarded by : Dave Bennett, Art Mawhinney, Steve Remen	TBA
22	9	"Don't Hold Your Breath"	Written by : Michael Udesky, Scott Musgrove with Michael Ryan; Story by : Michael Ryan; Storyboarded by : Don Manuel, Steve Remen, Art Mawhinney	TBA
23	10	"Big Fat Dog"	Written by : Scott Musgrove, Michael Ryan; Storyboarded by : Armando Carrillo, Hector Carrillo	TBA
24	11	"The Good, the Bad and the Lazy"	Written by : Scott Musgrove, Michael Ryan; Story by : Michael Ryan; Storyboarded by : Don Manuel, Armando Carrillo	TBA
25	12	"The Day Fat Dog Stood; Still"	Written by : Scott Musgrove, Michael Ryan, Ben Townsend; Story by : Ben Townsend; Storyboarded by : Armando Carrillo	TBA
26	13	"Mom's Mistake"	Written by : Scott Musgrove, Michael Ryan; Story by : Scott Musgrove, Michael Ryan, Ben Townsend; Storyboarded by : John Ahern, Ian Freedman, Mike Kazaleh	TBA

== Television airing ==
The series originally premiered on Cartoon Network UK in February 2000, and remained on the channel until 2005 (mainly being repeated late-at-night). Channel 5 later acquired free-TV rights and began airing the show in 2001 as part of their The Core teen block, and later transitioned to Milkshake FM.

The show also aired on several other Cartoon Network feeds, including Cartoon Network MENA.

Over the next few years, the show was pre-sold by TV-Loonland to other broadcasters and companies, like Nox Music in Russia, Retelsat in Spain, and ZigZag in Poland.

In Australia, the series aired on Nickelodeon.

The show also re-ran on KidsCo in a small number of countries.

== Home media ==
In 2000, home video distributor Maverick announced they had acquired the British home video rights to Sony Wonder's catalogue in the United Kingdom. The company released single VHS volume of the series in October 2000, containing the first three episodes in production order: "Bright Side of the Moon", "Forgotten Fat Dog", and "Power Play".
