= Hot Wheels: World Race =

- Promotional poster
- Directed by: Andrew Duncan; William Lau
- Written by: Mark Edens; Jeff Gomez; Fabian Nicieza
- Based on: Hot Wheels by Mattel
- Produced by: Jeff Gomez; Gio Corsi; Ian Richter; Sharan Wood
- Starring: Andrew Francis; Michael Donovan; Kathleen Barr; Brian Drummond
- Music by: Brian Carson; Ball of Waxx
- Production companies: Mattel Entertainment; Mainframe Entertainment
- Distributed by: Artisan Home Entertainment; Family Home Entertainment
- Release date: December 2, 2003
- Running time: 110 minutes
- Countries: United States; Canada
- Language: English

Hot Wheels: World Race is a 2003 animated sports action film based on the Hot Wheels television series Hot Wheels: Highway 35 – World Race that premiered on Cartoon Network from July 12 to August 2, 2003 which includes five episodes, "Ring of Fire", "The Greatest Challenge", "Desert Heat", "Frozen Fire" and "Wheel of Power" divided into a feature film. This serves as the follow-up to the 1969 animated series Hot Wheels. The film was distributed on DVD by Family Home Entertainment and Artisan Entertainment. The video game Hot Wheels: World Race was based on the television series. It was released on VHS and DVD on December 2, 2003, and was followed by a series of 4 sequel movies, titled Hot Wheels: AcceleRacers (2005).

== Synopsis ==
After receiving his driver's license on his 16th birthday, Jack "Rabbit" Wheeler (from the 1969 animated series)'s grandson Josef "Vert" Wheeler joins the World Race to find the fastest driver in the world. Drivers race in highly advanced cars by traveling through a portal to another dimension created by aliens called the Accelerons. Dr. Peter Tezla, founder of the Scrim Corporation, created the competition for human drivers to get to end of the track and retrieve a zero-point energy source called the Wheel of Power. Will the drivers succeed at returning the Wheel of Power to its rightful spot in Hot Wheels City, or will they let it fall into the hands of Gelorum and her evil robots?

The racers are split into 5 teams, led by Banjee Castillo (Roadbeasts), Brian Kadeem (Dune Ratz), Taro Kitano (Scorchers), Kurt Wylde (Street Breed), and Vert Wheeler (Wave Rippers).

== Cast ==
- Andrew Francis as Josef "Vert" Wheeler
- Brian Drummond as Kurt Wylde / Zed-36 / CLYP Robot
- Kevan Ohtsji as Taro Kitano
- Michael Benyaer as Banjee Castillo / GIG
- Cusse Mankuma as Brian "Zone" Kadeem
- Venus Terzo as Lani Tam / Esmeralda Sanchez
- Doron Bell Jr. as Alec "Hud" Wood
- Will Sanderson as Mark Wylde
- Kaj Erik Eriksen as Skeet
- Kirby Morrow as Chuvo
- Scott McNeil as Dan Dresden / Ric "Griffin" Handy / Rekkas / Toño
- Blu Mankuma as Haziz
- Kathleen Barr as Gelorum
- Michael Donovan as Dr. Peter Tezla
- John Payne as Major Jack Wheeler, Jr. / DMV Person

== See also ==
- Hot Wheels: World Race (video game)

Hot Wheels shows:

- Hot Wheels (1969–1971)
- Heroes on Hot Wheels (1991–1992)
- Hot Wheels: World Race (2003)
- Hot Wheels: AcceleRacers (2005–2006)
- Hot Wheels Battle Force 5 (2009–2011)
- Team Hot Wheels (2014–2017)
- Hot Wheels Let's Race (2024–2026)
