= Brian Drummond =

Canadian voice actor (born 1969)

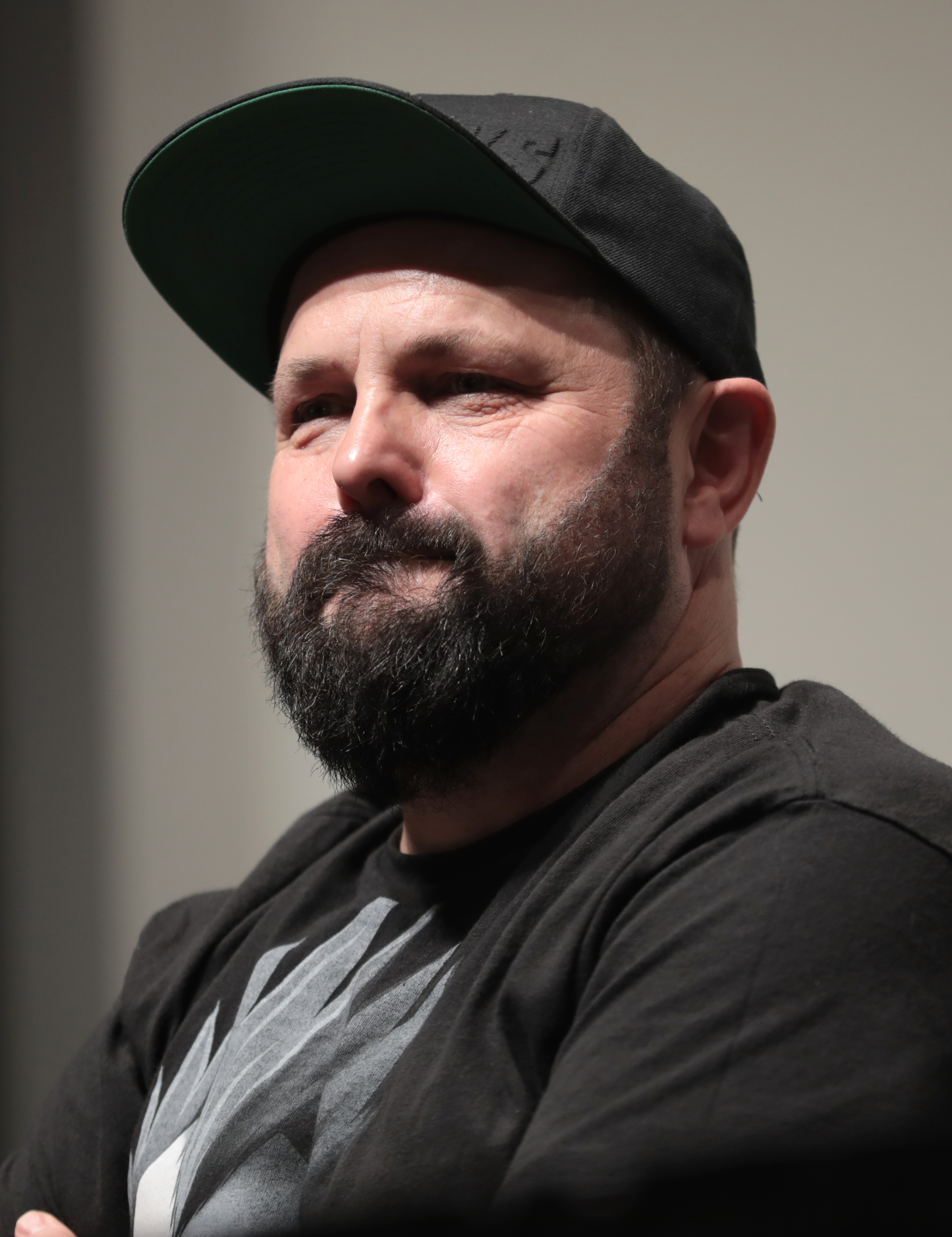
- Drummond in 2023
- Born: August 10, 1969 (age 57); Salmon Arm, British Columbia, Canada
- Occupation: Voice actor
- Years active: 1992–present
- Spouse: Laura Drummond (m. 1992)
- Children: 3

Brian Drummond (born August 10, 1969) is a Canadian voice actor. He formerly served on the board of directors for the New Westminster-based Urban Academy along with his wife, Laura Drummond, also a voice artist. Usually working in Vancouver, he is often cast in antagonistic or authoritative voice roles.

== Career ==
Drummond was born in Salmon Arm, British Columbia. A graduate of the acclaimed Studio 58, he started out as a theatre actor, but eventually found himself moving into voice acting full-time. Based out of Vancouver, he works on various animated programs.

Most well known for his role as Vegeta, Yajirobe, and Vegito in the Ocean Productions English dub of the anime series Dragon Ball Z, Drummond tends to be cast as either an impassive warrior (Andrew Waltfeld), or a kind-hearted father-figure (Reverend Malchio). In the 2000s, he played the role of the cowardly Yuna Roma Seiran in Mobile Suit Gundam SEED Destiny as well as Ryuk in Death Note. He has landed prominent roles in various anime such as Renkotsu in Inuyasha, and Gundam Wing as Zechs Merquise. Drummond has also appeared in Da Vinci's Inquest in minor background roles.

He was originally cast as Cyclops, the lead male protagonist of X-Men: Evolution. He recorded the very first episode of the show, but the series was eventually re-cast with Kirby Morrow in the role.

In 2003, Drummond voiced Kurt Wylde in the animated film Hot Wheels: World Race. In 2005, he reprised his role as Kurt Wylde in the animated film series Hot Wheels: AcceleRacers.

From 2006 until 2008, he voiced Ork Warboss Gorgutz in the video game Warhammer 40,000: Dawn of War, and several other expansion packs under the Dawn of War title.

In 2017, participated in Funimation's English dub as a cloned version of Vegeta for Dragon Ball Super, where Drummond notably worked alongside his Funimation counterpart Christopher Sabat, who provided Vegeta's voice for the Funimation version of the Dragon Ball English dub.

The popular line "It's Over 9000!", spoken by Vegeta, was voiced by Drummond. It appeared in the 21st Dragon Ball Z dub episode, titled "The Return of Goku", which originally aired on American television in 1997. Drummond's reading of the line eventually became an internet meme starting in 2006.

== Personal life ==
He is married to Laura Drummond and has a son and two daughters; Aidan (born 1995), Brynna (pronounced BRIN-ah, born 1997), and Ashlyn, who have also begun to follow in their father's voice-over work. His daughter Brynna voiced Babs Seed, the cousin of Apple Bloom and her siblings, in the television series My Little Pony: Friendship Is Magic, a show which Drummond also appears in. His son Aidan voiced Marty, the main character who earns the titular name in the animated series Eon Kid.

== Voice roles ==
=== Anime ===
- Black Lagoon – Benny and Wentzel Ahbe
- Black Lagoon: Roberta's Blood Trail – Benny
- Black Lagoon: The Second Barrage – Benny and Wentzel Ahbe
- Brain Powerd – Lasse Lundberg
- Cardcaptors – Aiden Avalon and Mr. Terada
- Cardcaptors: The Movie – Aiden Avalon and Mr. Terada
- Death Note – Ryuk, Suguru Shimura, Zakk Irius, Roy and Sudo
- Death Note Re-Light: Visions of a God – Ryuk and Suguru Shimura
- Death Note Re-Light 2: L's Successors – Ryuk
- Dragon Ball Super (Funimation dub) – Copy Vegeta
- Dragon Ball Z (Ocean Group dub) – Vegeta, Yajirobe, Fortuneteller Baba, Vegito, King Vegeta, Pikkon and Yamu
- Dragon Drive - Mahiru
- Dragon Quest: The Adventure of Dai - Hadlar and Flazzard
- Elemental Gelade – Jimothy Cubege
- Escaflowne (Ocean Group Dub) – Allen Schezar
- The Girl Who Leapt Through Time – Makoto's Father
- Ghost in the Shell: Stand Alone Complex: The Laughing Man – Saito
- Ghost in the Shell: Stand Alone Complex 2nd GIG: Individual 11 – Saito
- Hamtaro – Tongari-kun and Hambeard
- Inuyasha – Renkotsu, Juromaru and Kageromaru
- Key the Metal Idol – Hikaru Tsurugi
- Master Keaton – Travis, Mikami and Petrol Station Clerk
- Master Keaton (OVA version) – Leon Hannah, Assissant Professor Yamamoto and Eliah's Father
- Megaman NT Warrior – SkullMan, Heatman, WhaleMan, SnakeMan and MoltanicMan
- Megaman NT Warrior: Axcess – HeatMan, SkullMan and WhaleMan
- Mobile Suit Gundam: Encounters in Space – Bernard Monsha
- Mobile Suit Gundam Wing – Zechs Merquise/Milliardo Peacecraft
- Mobile Suit Gundam SEED – Andrew Waltfeld, Reverend Malchio, Ahmed El-Fasi
- Mobile Suit Gundam SEED Destiny – Andrew Waltfeld, Reverend Malchio and Yuna Roma Seiran
- Mobile Suit Gundam 00 – Brian Stegmeyer, Dr. Moreno, Homer Katagiri, Federation President and Bring Stabity
- Monster Rancher – Tiger
- Nana – Yasushi Takagi
- Ōban Star-Racers – Satis, Colonel Toros and Zard
- Popotan – Keith
- Powerpuff Girls Z – Poncho
- Project ARMS – Hayato Shingu
- Project ARMS: The 2nd Chapter – Hayato Shingu
- Ranma ½ (1989) – Yasukichi, Joe and Shadow Ranma
- Shakugan No Shana – Additional voices, Rinne, Denizens of the Crimson Realm and Merihim
- The SoulTaker – Dr. Kyoya
- Starship Operators – Kouki Sakakibara and Lewis Belmont
- Transformers Armada – Blurr
- Transformers Energon – ShockBlast
- Transformers Cybertron – Jetfire and Jolt
- The Vision of Escaflowne – Allen Schezar and Susumu Amano (Bandai Entertainment dub)
- Ultraviolet: Code 044 - Dr. Garcia
- Zoids: New Century Zero – Jack Cisco and Oscar Hemeros
- Zoids: Fuzors – Blake

=== Animation ===
- 16 Hudson – JP
- Action Dad – Mr. Bald, Referee, Joe and Sheldon
- Action Man: X Missions – The Movie – Red Wolf
- Amelia's Moving Pictures – Mr. Nudel
- Astonishing X-Men – Wolverine
- Baby Looney Tunes – Floyd Minton and Baby Elmer
- Barbie: Fairytopia – Larkspur
- Barbie: Princess Charm School – Prince, Guard and Royal Judge Man
- Barbie and the Magic of Pegasus – Ferris and Aiden's Father
- Barbie and the Three Musketeers – Musketeer #2
- Barbie as the Island Princess – Lorenzo
- Barbie as the Princess and the Pauper – Nick and Guard 1
- Barbie of Swan Lake – Reggie
- Barbie: Thumbelina – Poofles
- Beast Machines – Jetstorm
- Beat Bugs – Postman Bee, Glowies
- Billy the Cat – Billy
- Bionicle 2: Legends of Metru Nui – Matau, Onewa
- Bionicle 3: Web of Shadows – Matau and Onewa
- Bob the Builder – Carl Parker (US), Roland (US) and Mayor Snipe (US)
- Bob the Builder: Mega Machines – Ace (US)
- Bratz: Desert Jewelz – Charlat, Operator and Prod. Assissant
- Bratz Babyz Save Christmas – Santa Claus, Cop, Waiter and Mall Employee
- Bratz Kidz: Fairy Tales – Chadwick, Mr. Grimm and Nick
- Bratz Kidz: Sleep-Over Adventure – Cloe's Dad and Sr. Miracle
- Bratz Girlz Really Rock – Jules
- The Bravest Knight – The Giant
- Class of the Titans – Hermes, Oracle, Agnon, Hephaestus, Gary and Sam
- Coconut Fred's Fruit Salad Island! – Lemon Wedge
- Corner Gas Animated – Zeke, Ike, Impersonator #1, Sasquatch, Trucker, Plasti-Potty Guy, Old Man Wilkie, Werewolf Guy, Radio Announcer, Priest (1), News Broadcaster
- The Deep – Proteus, Dolos, Danny Boy, Salvage Crew, Crewman #1, Captain Marko, Resort Worker
- Dinosaur Train – Alvin Allosaurus, Larry Lambeosaurus, Eugene Euoplocephalus, Mr. Quetzalcoatlus, Mr. Therizinosaurus, Zhuang Zigongosaurus, Quinn Qantassaurus and Apollo Apatosaurus
- Dinotrux – Dozer, Break-Itt, George, Otto #1, Drago-O, Woodland Reptool Leader, Wings, Tops, Craneosaur #1 (1), Stegarbasaur #1, Craneosaur #2, Hydrodon, Rumble Grumble
- Doggie Daycare – Crocket
- Dragon Booster – Kawake, Saynn, and Additional voices
- The Dragon Prince – Ziard and The Stern One
- Dreamkix – Andres, Hudson, and Viali Goat
- Dr. Dimensionpants – Dunley, Psycho Steve, Glug, Dutch, Dr. Dimensionsocks, Glass Skull
- Exchange Student Zero – General Chaos
- Fat Dog Mendoza – Cruddy McFearson
- G.I. Joe Extreme – Ballistic
- G.I. Joe: Ninja Battles – Tiger Claw
- G.I. Joe: Valor vs. Venom – Slash
- Gadget & the Gadgetinis – Dr. Claw, Dr. Thaw
- George of the Jungle – Witch Doctor
- GeoTrax – Bruno, Goggles, Samuel, Irving
- Geronimo Stilton – Geronimo Stilton and Simon Squealer
- The Guava Juice Show – Hampersand
- He-Man and the Masters of the Universe – Stinkor, Two-Bad (Tuvar), Belzar, Unilope Shepherd, Claw Guy 2, Odiphus and Tuvar
- Henchmen – Old Doug
- Hero: 108 – Jumpy Ghostface, High Roller, Sparky White, Sailor Brothers, Golden Eye Husky, Master Chou, Elephant King, Cheetah King, Groundhog King and Human Man
- The Hollow – Death
- Hot Wheels AcceleRacers: Ignition – Kurt Wylde
- Hot Wheels AcceleRacers: The Speed of Silence – Kurt Wylde
- Hot Wheels AcceleRacers: Breaking Point – Kurt Wylde
- Hot Wheels AcceleRacers: The Ultimate Race – Kurt Wylde
- Hot Wheels Highway 35 - World Race – Kurt Wylde
- Hot Wheels Battle Force 5 – Sherman Cortez, Krytus, Zug, Krocomodo, Sheriff Johnson and Blador
- Hot Wheels World Race – Kurt Wylde and Zed-36
- Inspector Gadget's Biggest Caper Ever – Dr. Claw
- Inspector Gadget's Last Case: Claw's Revenge – Dr. Claw
- Iron Man: Armored Adventures – Crimson Dynamo, Iron Manager and O'Brian
- Journey To GloE – Swasn't/Barkington
- Kate & Mim-Mim – Gobble
- Kid vs. Kat – Harley and Buck Diamond
- Krypto the Superdog – Streaky the Supercat and Eddie Whitney
- The Last Kids on Earth – Rover, Blarg, Wormungulous, Tres, Belly Buster, Grrravel, Eyeball Monster, Camo Beast, Bug Monster, Biggun, Zapper, Hydriathon, Possessed King Wretch, Spikapede, Tormentasaur, Scrapken, Terror-ranchala, Stuffie
- LeapFrog – Additional voices
- Lego Jurassic World: Legend of Isla Nublar – Additional voices
- Lego Nexo Knights – Axl, Merlock, King Halbert, Herb Herbertson
- Lego Ninjago: Masters of Spinjitzu – Kruncha and Nuckal, Iron Baron, Smith Daryll, Percy Shippelton, Char, Elemental Cobra, Krag, Grimfax, Formling Leader, Newbie Gamer, Sage Master, Hailmar, Gleck, Minos, Engelbert, Twitchy Tim, Zippy, PoulErik (top head), Gripe
- Lego Star Wars: Droid Tales – Watto, Zeb, Admiral Motti
- Lego Star Wars: The Yoda Chronicles – Bobby, Gamorran Guard, Storm Trooper 1, Jabba the Hutt and Watto
- The Little Prince – The Fox (with Aidan Drummond voicing the Prince)
- Littlest Pet Shop – Shake A Leg Judge #3, Igor Bogomolov, L-Zard, Shahrukh, Shivers, Singing Fish, Ollie Arms, Desi, Tiny, Octopus Creature, Big and Feathered Parade Judge, Ling Pen, Terra Cotta Warrior Chief, Chinese Dragon, Goldy and Lamasque
- Littlest Pet Shop shorts – L-Zard
- Littlest Pet Shop: A World of Our Own – Mugs Stubbytail, Roman, Pet Catcher, Captain Gilturtle, Bertram Corgiwaddle, Clicks Monkeyford
- Martha Speaks – Dr. Harold Pablum, Danny Lorraine and Skits
- Marvel Super Hero Adventures – Iron Man, Groot
- Maryoku Yummy – Fudan
- Max Steel – Butch, Troy Winter/Extroyer, Earth Elementor, Water Elementor, Thi Technician, Robber and Police Officer
- Maya the Bee – Judge Beeswax, Kurt, Deez, Edgar (season 1)
- Mega Man: Fully Charged – Principal Hundred Hundred
- ¡Mucha Lucha! – Buena Dad
- ¡Mucha Lucha!: The Return of El Maléfico – Buena Dad and El Evil Cheese Grande
- Mune: Guardian of the Moon – Spleen, Cousin 2
- My Little Pony: The Runaway Rainbow – Spike
- My Little Pony: Friendship Is Magic – Ahuizotl, Caramel (S01E26), Doc Top, Double Diamond, Dr. Hooves (S01E12), "Dumb-Bell" (colt), Filthy Rich, Lucky Clover (S01E26), Mr. Cake, Noteworthy, Seabreeze, Sheriff Silverstar, Uncle Orange, Davenport (S07E19)
- My Little Pony: Equestria Girls – Rainbow Rocks – Book Delivery Pony
- My Little Pony: Equestria Girls – Legend of Everfree – Filthy Rich
- My Little Pony: The Princess Promenade – Spike
- My Little Pony Crystal Princess: The Runaway Rainbow – Spike
- My Little Pony Live: The World's Biggest Tea Party – Spike
- Nerds and Monsters – Lyle, Fighting Monster 2
- Nina's World – Sheriff Saddlehorn, Dragon, Oliver
- Ninjago: Dragons Rising – Riyu, Ras, Lobbo, Fedulian, Security Bots, Barry Nived, Dragonian Hunter, Medical Bots, Gweeg
- The Nutty Professor – Dean V. Wu
- Open Season: Scared Silly – Ian, Reilly, Tree-Hugger Man
- Packages from Planet X – Corvis Copernicus and Leepthor
- Pac-Man and the Ghostly Adventures – Clyde, Dr. Buttocks, Butt-ler and Aide
- Pucca – Garu
- Ratchet & Clank – The Plumber, Inspectobot, Warbot, Evil Zurkons
- Rated A for Awesome – Noam
- Ready Jet Go! – Face 9000, Bergs, Don, Pizza Guy, Neil Armstrong, Customer #1, Generic Adult, Radio Reporter, Spinach, Weekend Robot, Bortronian Cook, Scientist #1, Chewy
- Rev & Roll - Rumble, Ben, Skip, Baker, Townsperson #3, Rusty, Foreman, Mr. Wilson, Nick, Movie Announcer, Mr. Mayor, Narrator
- Rollbots – Botch, Chief Surgeon Koto
- Roary the Racing Car – Additional Voices
- Slugterra – Maurice, El Diablos Nachos, Grendel, Redhook, Billy, Imperiled Townsman, Spinks, Slug Run Announcer, Sergeant Slug, Darius, Behemoth, Train Engineer Henchman 2, Movie Audience Nerd, Tobias, Boss Ember, Blast Vanderhuge, Cyrus, Molenoid Elder, Shadow Clan Lightwell Chieftain, Ice, Shadow Clan Member, Coop (2012–present)
- Slugterra: Ghoul from Beyond – Boss Ember
- Slugterra: Return of the Elementals – RedHook, TV Announcer
- Slugterra: Slug Fu Showdown – Billy
- Sonic Prime – Doctor Eggman, Mr. Dr. Eggman, Dr. Done-It, Eggforcers, Stormbeard
- Sonic Underground – Knuckles the Echidna
- Spider-Man Unlimited – Eddie Brock and Venom
- Storm Hawks – Carver, Gull, Dealer, Hamish and Wayside Assistant Cruiser Sales Manager
- Sunburnt Unicorn
- Super Dinosaur – Squidious, Doometrodon, Lead Researcher, Dr. Scofield, Subject 42, Dino Man (2), Earth Core Agent (3), Marine Researcher, Earth Core Tech #2 (1), Computer Voice, Beta 29, Roccodon
- Super Monsters – Frankie's Dad
- Super Team Canada – Sasquatchewan, Ted Zorg Sr., Sask's dad, Additional Voices
- Thor: Tales of Asgard – Fenris Wolf, Additional Voices
- Tony Hawk in Boom Boom Sabotage – DJ, Hamshank, Mimic and Chopper Chuck
- Ultimate Wolverine vs. Hulk – Wolverine, Pilot and Pat
- Under Wraps – Bill, Pharaoh
- War of the Realms: Marvel Ultimate Comics – Narrator, Hot Dog Guy, Passenger #2
- What About Mimi? – Additional Voices
- The Willoughbys – Baby Ruth, Phil, Yokel
- Wishfart – King of the Underworld, Stephanie, Joey
- Wolverine: Origin – Wolverine and Thomas Logan
- Wolverine versus Sabretooth – Wolverine
- Wolverine: Weapon X – Wolverine, Iron Fist, Martin, Spider-Friends, Guard 1, Cop 1, Civilian 1
- X-Men: Evolution – Hunter, Julien Boudreaux
- Yakkity Yak – Keo
- Zigby – McMeer

=== Live-action ===
- Death Note – Ryuk (voice)
- Death Note 2: The Last Name – Ryuk (voice)
- L: Change the World – Ryuk (voice)
- Marley & Me: The Puppy Years – Trouble (voice)

=== Video games ===
- CSI: Miami – Enrique Sanchez
- Devil Kings – Muri (English dub)
- Dragalia Lost – Xenos, Zhu Baije, AC-011 Garland, Ebisu, Chronos Nyx, Humanoid Zodiark, Zodiark, High Zodiark, Thaniel, Rodrigo, Karl
- Dynasty Warriors: Gundam – Milliardo Peacecraft (English dub)
- Dynasty Warriors: Gundam 2 – Milliardo Peacecraft (English dub)
- Dynasty Warriors: Gundam 3 – Milliardo Peacecraft, Heero Yuy (English dub)
- George of the Jungle and the Search for the Secret – Witch Doctor
- Mobile Suit Gundam: Encounters in Space – Bernard Monsha (English dub)
- Warhammer 40,000: Dawn of War - Warboss Gorgutz 'Ead 'Unter
- Warhammer 40,000: Dawn of War IV - Warboss Gorgutz 'Ead 'Unter

Preceded by None	English voice of Knuckles the Echidna (broadcast TV series); 1999–2000	Succeeded by Dan Green

Preceded by None	English voice of Vegeta	Succeeded by Christopher Sabat
