= Hot Wheels: World Race (video game) =

2003 video game

- North American PS2 cover art featuring Twin Mill, Power Rocket, and Deora II
- Developer: Climax Brighton
- Publisher: THQ
- Platforms: PlayStation 2, GameCube, Windows, Game Boy Advance
- Release: NA: October 28, 2003; NA: November 14, 2003 (GBA); NA: November 19, 2003 (Win); PAL: November 28, 2003
- Genre: Racing
- Modes: Single-player, multiplayer

Hot Wheels: World Race is a racing game developed by Climax Brighton and published by THQ. It is based on the television series Hot Wheels: World Race that was released by Hot Wheels and Mainframe Entertainment, and 35 Hot Wheels toy automobiles were released in conjunction with the television series to coincide with the 35th anniversary of the creation of the franchise.

== Gameplay ==
The gameplay of World Race is similar to many other racing games. Players can do special tricks when in the air, which adds on to the players' car's Nitrox 2 booster fuel. Collecting gold rings also increases the boost. The PC and home console versions all have split-screen multiplayer.

== Reception ==
Reception

Aggregate score
Aggregator	Score			
Aggregator	GBA	GameCube	PC	PS2
Metacritic	48/100	59/100	64/100	55/100

Review scores
Publication	Score			
Publication	GBA	GameCube	PC	PS2
Computer and Video Games	N/A	2.6/10	N/A	N/A
Game Informer	N/A	N/A	N/A	6/10
GameSpot	N/A	6.3/10	N/A	6.3/10
GameZone	N/A	7.5/10	7/10	7.4/10
IGN	N/A	4/10	N/A	4/10
NGC Magazine	N/A	33%	N/A	N/A
Nintendo Power	2.4/5	2.6/5	N/A	N/A
PlayStation Official Magazine – UK	N/A	N/A	N/A	6/10
PC Gamer (UK)	N/A	N/A	55%	N/A
PC Zone	N/A	N/A	58%	N/A

The game received "mixed" reviews on all platforms except the Game Boy Advance version, which received "generally unfavorable reviews", according to video game review aggregator website Metacritic.
