= Hot Wheels Let's Race =

American animated television series

- Genre: Sports (Auto racing); Preschool
- Based on: Hot Wheels by Mattel
- Developed by: Rob David; Jordan Gershowitz; Melanie Shannon
- Directed by: Moto Sakakibara; Collette Sunderman (voice director)
- Voices of: Jakari Fraser; Amari McCoy; Griffen Campbell; Risa Mei; Josh Keaton; Charlie Schlatter; Grey DeLisle-Griffin
- Theme music composer: Patrick Stump
- Opening theme: "Hot Wheels Let's Race Theme", written and performed by Patrick Stump
- Ending theme: "Hot Wheels Let's Race Theme" (Instrumental)
- Composer: Patrick Stump
- Country of origin: United States
- Original language: English
- No. of seasons: 3
- No. of episodes: 20 + 1 special

Production
- Executive producers: Rob David; Christopher Keenan; Frederic Soulie
- Producers: Diane A. Crea; Mike Roberts
- Running time: 22 minutes (2 11-minute segments)
- Production companies: Mattel Television; Sprite Animation Studios; OLM Digital

Original release
- Network: Netflix
- Release: March 4, 2024 – October 20, 2026

Hot Wheels Let's Race is an American animated children's television series based on the Hot Wheels toy line by Mattel. The first season was released on Netflix on March 4, 2024. The second season was released on September 9, 2024, and the third season was released on March 3, 2025. A 45-minute special, "Attack of the T-Rex", was released on October 20, 2026.

== Premise ==
Six young hopefuls at the Hot Wheels Ultimate Garage Racing Camp learn the skills they need to become the next generation of amazing racers.

— Netflix

== Cast ==
=== Main ===
- Jakari Fraser (seasons 1–3)/Carter Burney (in "Attack of the T-Rex") as Coop, a young boy who is always willing to help his friends and dreams of becoming a top-tier race car driver. His signature color is blue.
- Amari McCoy as Spark, a young girl with an inventive streak who believes in scientific methods. Her signature color is yellow.
- Griffen Campbell (seasons 1–3)/Sophia Fox (in "Attack of the T-Rex") as Mac, a gluttonous young boy who dreams of becoming a stunt driver. His signature color is green.
- Risa Mei as Brights, a young girl with a robotic prosthetic arm who enjoys taking photographs and looking through stories. Her signature color is pink.
- Josh Keaton as Axle Spoiler, a brash pre-teen and the son of champion Striker Spoiler, who aims to prove he has the family's racing legacy. His signature color is red.
- Charlie Schlatter as Sidecar, a short young boy with a mop top who is Axle's best friend. His signature color is grey.
- Grey DeLisle-Griffin as Dash Wheeler, a former champion racer and the racing camp's instructor.
- Eric Bauza as Squeakers, Dash's robot assistant designed as a toolbox, who helps around the Ultimate Garage. He only speaks in robot beeps in which Brights can understand him.

=== Villains ===
- Eric Bauza as Professor Rearview, a professor and former racer who seeks to destroy Hot Wheels City with giant animals due to his hatred of its heavy car culture.

=== Recurring ===
- Eric Bauza as Coop's father
- Sonya Leslie as Coop's mother
- Khary Payton as Speedy Getaway, a news reporter for Hot Wheels City.
- Danny Trejo as Striker Spoiler, current racing champion and Axle's father.
- Fred Tatasciore as
  - Uncle Larry, Brights' uncle and the owner of the eponymous pizza parlor in the city.
  - Mega-Wrex, Dash's monster truck friend and Mac’s biggest fan.
- Julie Nathanson as Cruise Rearview, the daughter of Professor Rearview. She races with the other members of the Ultimate Garage to win and destroy it with the help of her father. She reforms and helps the racers get the Ultimate Garage back from her father. Her signature color is indigo.

== Episodes ==
=== Series overview ===
Series overview
Season	Episodes	Originally released
1	10	March 4, 2024
2	5	September 9, 2024
3	5	March 3, 2025
Special	1	October 20, 2026

=== Season 1 (2024) ===
No. overall	No. in season	Title	Written by	Original release date
1	1	"A Wheel Good Time"	Jordan Gershowitz	February 21, 2024 (YouTube premiere); March 4, 2024 (Netflix)
1	1	"Racing to Success"	Jordan Gershowitz	February 21, 2024 (YouTube premiere); March 4, 2024 (Netflix)
On the first day of racing school, the racers work together to catch a runaway tire in Hot Wheels City. Then it's time for the first Camp Champ race!
2	2	"Scream Machines"	Ellie Guzman	March 4, 2024
2	2	"Takeout Spinout"	Sarah Nerboso	March 4, 2024
Can the racers stop the Bone Shaker from haunting Hot Wheels city? And who has what it takes to win the tasty food delivery challenge?
3	3	"Keeping the Pace"	Jim Nolan	March 4, 2024
3	3	"Car Wash Catastrophe"	Kevin Burke and Chris "Doc" Wyatt	March 4, 2024
Coop uses the RocketFire to help two friends at once. The racers save the Ultimate Car Wash from Professor Rearview and his giant octopus.
4	4	"Night Fright"	Jenava Mie	March 4, 2024
4	4	"Scavenger Stunt Hunt"	Joelle Sellner	March 4, 2024
Mac and his friends drive Glow Racers when the lights go out in Hot Wheels City. The campers team up for a scavenger hunt challenge.
5	5	"Spoiler Warning"	Jim Nolan	March 4, 2024
5	5	"Victory Lapse"	Jordan Gershowitz	March 4, 2024
Striker Spoiler teaches the racers how to use boosters. Can they put their new skills to the rest for the second Camp Champ race of the season?
6	6	"Getting the Jump"	Jenava Mie	March 4, 2024
6	6	"Trashed Tracks"	Craig Carlisle	March 4, 2024
The racers show off their best moves in a jump challenge. Coop drives the total disposal to clean up supersized trash on the tracks of Hot Wheels City.
7	7	"Pizza with Extra Venom"	Kevin Burke and Chris "Doc" Wyatt	March 4, 2024
7	7	"Shifting Gears"	Sarah Nerboso	March 4, 2024
Professor Rearview unleashes a giant snake in Hot Wheels City. A game of Capture the Flag teaches a valuable lesson.
8	8	"Pedal to the Meddle"	Jenava Mie	March 4, 2024
8	8	"Follow the Lead Car"	Aydrea Walden	March 4, 2024
A self-driving car transporter with a T. rex head gets loose in Hot Wheels City. Axle steps on the gas in a Follow the Leader challenge.
9	9	"Eyes on the Prize"	Ellie Guzman	March 4, 2024
9	9	"Photo Finish"	Nick "Rocket" Rodriguez	March 4, 2024
A tricky obstacle course tests Coop's concentration skills. When Spark, Max, and Coop delete Brights' photos by mistake, they must race to retake them.
10	10	"In It to Win It"	Jim Nolan	March 4, 2024
10	10	"Fired Up!"	Jordan Gershowitz	March 4, 2024
Buckle up, because it's time for the final Camp Champ race of the season - and not even Professor Rearview and his dragon can stand in the racers' way!

=== Season 2 (2024) ===
No. overall	No. in season	Title	Written by	Original release date
11	1	"Cruise Control"	Jordan Gershowitz	September 9, 2024
11	1	"The S'more Fun the Better"	Sarah Nerboso	September 9, 2024
In the first race of Level 2, a mysterious newcomer hits the track and shakes up the competition. Then it's time to make s'mores - Hot Wheels style!
12	2	"Mini Coop"	Jim Nolan	September 9, 2024
12	2	"Jumping the Shark"	Adam Beechen	September 9, 2024
An accident shrinks Coop, Mac, and Spark in their cars. Professor Rearview drops a giant, hungry shark on the city's new Ultra Car Wash.
13	3	"Cruisin' to Victory"	Annie Nishida	September 9, 2024
13	3	"The Great Car Swap"	Amanda Deibert	September 9, 2024
Can Coop climb the leaderboard, or will Cruise drive away with a victory? Later on, the campers switch cars to learn valuable new racing skills.
14	4	"Go for the Gold"	Jenava Mie	September 9, 2024
14	4	"Sneezy Squeakers"	Nick "Rocket" Rodriguez	September 9, 2024
The racers search Hot Wheels City for the lucky Golden Steering Wheel. Brights uses creativity to make Squeakers feel better.
15	5	"Drive Me Batty"	Jordan Gershowitz	September 9, 2024
15	5	"Highs & Lows"	Matthew Drdek	September 9, 2024
Professor Rearview and his monster bat steal Dash's favorite car. Then the pressure's on to win the third race - but can Coop stay calm and focused?

=== Season 3 (2025) ===
No. overall	No. in season	Title	Written by	Original release date
16	1	"The Wrong Track"	Annie Nishida	March 3, 2025
16	1	"All Pumped Up"	Jim Nolan	March 3, 2025
Coop learns an important skill that every Hot Wheels racer needs. Spark's new invention sends the campers up, up and away!
17	2	"Keep on Monster Truckin'"	Julius Harper	March 3, 2025
17	2	"T-Rex Takeover"	Troy D. Patterson	March 3, 2025
A monster-sized guest teaches Mac a valuable lesson. The Ultimate T-Rex Transporter is gobbling up the cars in Hot Wheels City… but why?
18	3	"Party Pit Stop"	Sarah Nerboso	March 3, 2025
18	3	"End of the Road"	Amanda Deibert	March 3, 2025
Coop and his mom team up on the track. Then it's time to kick some tailpipe in the season's final race — and it's a winner-take-all contest.
19	4	"Stop Those Cars"	Jenava Mie	March 3, 2025
19	4	"Self-Destruct"	Jim Nolan	March 3, 2025
The racers use food trucks to stop Professor Rearview, but they'll need all the help they can get to save the Ultimate Garage from destruction.
20	5	"The Final Finish Line"	Annie Nishida	March 3, 2025
20	5	"Monster Mayhem"	Jordan Gershowitz	March 3, 2025
Beating Professor Rearview and his five giant monsters won't be easy, but a Hot Wheels racer always says, "Challenge accepted!"

=== Special (2026) ===
Title	Written by	Original release date
"Attack of the T-Rex"	Jordan Gershowitz	October 20, 2026
Beneath the tracks of Hot Wheels City, a legendary T-rex has slumbered for millions of years. But when this prehistoric predator is accidentally awakened, it's up to Coop — the new leader of the Ultimate Garage — and his crew to uncover the ancient secret behind its incredible power and race to stop the T-rex before it destroys the Ultimate Garage and all of Hot Wheels City!

== Production ==
On September 28, 2023, Netflix announced the greenlight of the series, alongside an order for additional episodes of Gabby's Dollhouse and a trailer for its first Cocomelon original series.

The animation is handled by Sprite Animation Studios and Japanese animation studio OLM Digital. Patrick Stump, lead singer of the band Fall Out Boy, composed the theme song and oversaw the score for all the episodes.

== Release ==
It was released on Netflix on March 4, 2024, with the second season released on September 9, 2024, and the third season released on March 3, 2025. A special, 45-minute episode was released on October 20, 2026.

== Reception ==
Common Sense Media gave Hot Wheels Let's Race a rating of four out of five stars, praising its emphasis on teamwork, perseverance, integrity and problem-solving, as well as its diverse cast and positive role models, particularly the female racing instructor Dash Wheeler. The review also commended the series for encouraging creativity and learning from mistakes, while noting its substantial product placement and potential to encourage toy purchases. It considered the racing sequences exciting rather than frightening, although it observed that the antagonist's unsportsmanlike behavior sometimes goes without immediate consequences.

The Encyclopedia of Science Fiction classified Hot Wheels Let's Race as children's science fiction, noting that its futuristic setting and speculative technologies are secondary to its racing-camp format. The encyclopedia praised the computer-generated animation's support for elaborate races and stunts and noted the series' educational emphasis on teamwork, problem-solving, perseverance and sportsmanship, but considered its worldbuilding comparatively underdeveloped: advanced inventions are generally treated as ordinary and rarely explored beyond their immediate use in racing, while Hot Wheels City itself remains sparsely populated and little explored. It also situated the series within the tradition of animated programs designed to promote associated toys, while noting its use of technologies including robots, holographic interfaces, antigravity and instantly created, programmable racetracks.

== Video game ==
Hot Wheels Let’s Race: Ultimate Speed, a video game based on this program was released on October 24, 2025, for Nintendo Switch, PlayStation 5, Xbox Series X/S, and Windows. This video game was developed by Bamtang Games and published by GameMill Entertainment.

== See also ==
- Hot Wheels (1969–1971)
- Heroes on Hot Wheels (1990–1992)
- Hot Wheels: World Race (2003)
- Hot Wheels: AcceleRacers (2005)
- Hot Wheels Battle Force 5 (2009–2013)
- Team Hot Wheels (2014–2017)
