= John Payne (voice actor) =

English-Canadian voice actor

- Occupation: Voice actor
- Years active: 1970–present

John Payne is an English-Canadian voice actor who was originally in the UK and now works with Ocean Studios in Vancouver, British Columbia. He has played several roles in anime, most notably Ramba Ral in Mobile Suit Gundam and Rasetsu in Inuyasha.

== Voice roles ==
- 3-2-1 Penguins! as Captain Zidgel (season two)
- Adieu Galaxy Express 999 as Meowdar, Tochiro
- Alienators: Evolution Continues as Additional Voices
- Barbie and the Rockers: Out of this World
- Brain Powered as Scientist
- Christopher the Christmas Tree
- Dreamkix as Roy's father
- Exosquad as Alec DeLeon, Sean Napier
- Fat Dog Mendoza as Avimimus, Buck Milligan
- Fatal Fury: The Motion Picture as Jamin
- Fantastic Four: World's Greatest Heroes as Henry Pym
- G.I. Joe: Spy Troops as Duke
- G.I. Joe: Valor vs. Venom as Duke
- Galaxy Express 999 Movie as Tochiro
- Green Legend Ran
- He-Man and the Masters of the Universe as Sy-Klone, Moss Man
- Help! I'm a Fish as Bill
- Hot Wheels: AcceleRacers – Breaking Point as Major Wheeler
- Hot Wheels AcceleRacers – The Ultimate Race as Major Wheeler
- Hot Wheels: World Race as Major Wheeler
- Human Crossing as Moriyama, Police Officer
- Inuyasha as Rasetsu
- Kessen as Kojuro Katakura, Retainer West
- Maison Ikkoku as Shun Mitaka
- Mary-Kate and Ashley in Action! as Additional Voices
- Master Keaton as Captain West (ep 27)
- Mobile Suit Gundam as Ramba Ral
- Mobile Suit Gundam Seed as Al-Jairi
- Mobile Suit Gundam 00 as Commander Kim
- ¡Mucha Lucha! as Sr. Pantalones
- Rainbow Fish as Sol
- Ranma ½: Big Trouble in Nekonron, China as Prince Kirin
- RoboCop: Alpha Commando as Additional Voices
- Roswell Conspiracies: Aliens, Myths and Legends as Additional Voices
- MegaMan NT Warrior as MetalMan
- Santamouse and the Ratdeer as Honest Wease
- Shadow Raiders as Sternum
- Sherlock Holmes in the 22nd Century as Dr. John Watson
- Spider-Man Unlimited as John Jameson
- Saber Marionette R as Sanchest (Act 1)
- Street Fighter as Escher
- The Baby Huey Show as Additional Voices
- The Cramp Twins as Agent X, Agent #2, Construction Worker
- The Story of Saiunkoku as Sojun Sa, Man B, and Sa Family Member 1
- What About Mimi? as Additional Voices
- Yvon of the Yukon as Maurice, Seedy Local

== Live-action roles ==
- The Commish as Marc Murray
- Da Vinci's Inquest as Park Maintenance
- MacGyver as Dave Edwards
- Super Dave's All Stars as Harry the SFX Guy
- Viper as Buddy Winters
- The X-Files as Guard and Jerald Glazebrook
