= Hot Wheels (TV series) =

American animated television series

- Genre: Animated series
- Created by: Fred Crippen; Eddie Smardan; Ken Snyder
- Voices of: Bob Arbogast; Melinda Casey; Casey Kasem; Albert Brooks; Susan Davis; Nora Marlowe; Michael Rye
- Theme music composer: Mike Curb
- Composer: Jack Fascinato
- Country of origin: United States
- Original language: English
- No. of seasons: 2
- No. of episodes: 17 (34 segments)

Production
- Executive producer: Kenneth C.T. Snyder
- Producers: Fred Crippen; Eddie Smardan; Ken Snyder
- Camera setup: I
- Running time: 30 minutes
- Production companies: Ken Snyder Properties; Pantomime Pictures

Original release
- Network: ABC
- Release: September 6, 1969 – September 4, 1971

Hot Wheels is an American animated television series broadcast on ABC from 1969 to 1971, under the primary sponsorship of Mattel Toys. It is based on the Hot Wheels brand of scale model cars. The show took pains to stress that it was "pro-safety", contrasting the safe and responsible behavior of the series' racing-club protagonists with the reckless behavior of their rivals.

The show was criticized by the Federal Communications Commission, which considered it a half-hour commercial for toy cars. ABC contested the charge, saying that there was no prior commitment to Mattel, and that Hot Wheels cars were never advertised during the program. The network was backed up by the National Association of Broadcasters, and the show remained on the ABC schedule for two seasons.

== Synopsis ==
The series mainly focused on the racing exploits of a high school student, Jack "Rabbit" Wheeler, who led the Hot Wheels Racing Club.

== Voice cast ==
- Bob Arbogast as Doc Warren
- Melinda Casey as Janet Martin
- Albert Brooks as Kip Chogi
- Susan Davis as Ardeth Pratt
- Casey Kasem as Dexter Carter
- Nora Marlowe as Mother O'Hare
- Michael Rye as Jack "Rabbit" Wheeler

== Episodes ==
1. Big Race
2. The Family Car
3. Fire Fighters
4. The Jewel
5. Fake Out - Stake Out
6. The Buggy Ride
7. Four Wheel Time Bomb
8. Hit and Run
9. It Takes a Team
10. Ardeth the Demon (Ardeth the Highwayman)
11. Like Father, Like Son
12. Avalanche Country
13. Danger Around the Clock
14. Tough Cop
15. Hotter Than the Devils
16. Underground
17. Rough Ride (The Test)
18. Race to Space
19. Monkey a-Okay
20. Diamonds Are a Girls Worst Friend
21. Big Heart, Little Hearts
22. Get Back on That Horse
23. Hitchhike to Danger
24. Dragon's Tooth Peak
25. The Doc Warren Trophy Race
26. Show-Off
27. Drag Strip
28. Mata Hari Ardeth
29. Slicker-Slicks

== FCC action ==
Some time during the show's broadcast, the Federal Communications Commission (FCC) received complaints from toy companies who argued that it was actually a thirty-minute commercial for the toys; one of them was Topper Toys, a rival to Mattel. The FCC obliged by ordering stations to log part of the airings as advertising time.

== See also ==
- Heroes on Hot Wheels (1991–1992)
- Hot Wheels: World Race (2002–2003)
- Hot Wheels: AcceleRacers (2004–2006)
- Hot Wheels Battle Force 5 (2009–2012)
- Hot Wheels Let's Race (2024–2026)
