= Ed, Edd n Eddy: The Mis-Edventures =

2005 video game

- North American cover art for the GameCube version
- Developer: Artificial Mind and Movement
- Publisher: Midway
- Composer: Patric Caird
- Series: Ed, Edd n Eddy
- Platforms: Game Boy Advance; GameCube; PlayStation 2; Xbox; Microsoft Windows
- Release: PlayStation 2, Game Boy Advance: NA: October 31, 2005; PAL: November 25, 2005; AU: December 1, 2005; GameCube, Xbox, Windows: NA: October 31, 2005
- Genres: Adventure, platform
- Mode: Single-player

Ed, Edd n Eddy: The Mis-Edventures is a 2005 video game developed by Artificial Mind and Movement and published by Midway. Based on the Cartoon Network animated television series Ed, Edd n Eddy. It uses 3D platformer gameplay on home console and PC versions whereas the Game Boy Advance version is a 2D side-scrolling video game. The game's plot is loosely structured around six different stories with two bonus levels, each involving a scam by the titular trio to acquire enough money to buy jawbreakers, a plot that mirrors that of the animated series.

It was announced on February 15, 2005, and released on October 31, 2005, for the PlayStation 2, Game Boy Advance, Xbox, GameCube, and Microsoft Windows, with the last three being released exclusively in North America. It is the second video game based on Ed, Edd n Eddy, succeeding Ed, Edd n Eddy: Jawbreakers! and preceding Ed, Edd n Eddy: Scam of the Century.

== Gameplay ==
Screenshot from the first level of the home console version showing Ed, Edd, and Eddy

Ed, Edd n Eddy: The Mis-Edventures is a 3D platforming game in which protagonists Ed, Edd, and Eddy are playable characters. Players can use them in special tag team formations like the "(Leaning-)Tower-of-Eddy" (as Eddy), "Trampol-Edd" (as Edd aka Double D), and "Batter-Ed(-Ram)" (as Ed) to complete eight levels, referred to as scams. The Eds' normal weapons and skills include Ed lifting heavy objects and smashing his head, Edd using a slingshot to hit distant targets and smacking with his ruler in close range, and Eddy using the El Mongo stink bomb to stun enemies, along with using his wallet attached to a chain like a yo-yo.

Unlike other releases of the game, the Game Boy Advance version is a 2D side-scroller with slightly different missions and an additional tutorial level. This version has a stronger emphasis on collecting coins to buy jawbreakers, although the plot as well as the Eds' special abilities remain largely the same.

== Plot ==
The game is divided into six main levels, each having its own separate plot. In the first level, "Cool Yer Ed", the Eds attempt to gather ice cubes to sell snow-cones in the hot summer weather. During the second level, "Pin the Tail on the Ed", the Eds sneak through a sewer system to crash Jimmy's birthday party. For the third level, "Must Be Something I Ed", the Eds race to the candy store, which is offering free jawbreakers as part of a customer appreciation event. The fourth level, "Ed on Arrival", features the Eds navigating through Rolf's construction zone obstacle course to achieve an Urban Ranger badge. In the fifth level, "Nightmare on Ed Street", the Eds venture into an abandoned house to retrieve Jimmy's stuffed animal. The game's sixth level, "Ed Marks the Spot", has the Eds scour the neighborhood for Eddy's stolen stash of jawbreakers.

Two bonus stages are available in the console and Windows versions of the game. In "Ed-Zilla", Ed takes on the role of a giant monster who destroys the cardboard city of Edtropolis. During "Rebel Robot Ranch", Edd and Eddy battle through an army of robots to rescue Ed, who has been captured.

== Development ==
On February 15, 2005, Cartoon Network Enterprises announced they had signed a multi-territory publishing agreement with Midway Games to release video games based on three Cartoon Network shows, with Ed, Edd n Eddy being one of the listed properties. The deal was made for Midway to enter the licensed children's market.

== Reception ==
Reception

Aggregate scores
Aggregator	Score			
Aggregator	GameCube	PC	PS2	Xbox
GameRankings	54.0%	31.7%	54.0%	59.8%
Metacritic	55/100	35/100	50/100	56/100

Review score
Publication	Score			
Publication	GameCube	PC	PS2	Xbox
IGN	N/A	2.9/10	5.0/10	5.1/10

Ed, Edd n Eddy: The Mis-Edventures received generally mixed reviews from critics. IGN's Charles Onyett criticized the game for its "unclear" objectives, repetitive voice acting, and short length, but he praised the game's graphics for "reproduce[ing] the visual style of the show quite accurately...to an often hilarious degree."
