= Ed, Edd n Eddy: Scam of the Century =

2007 video game

- Cover art
- Developers: Art Co., Ltd
- Publisher: D3 Publisher
- Director: Yoshihide Nagaminex
- Producer: Hiroyuki Otsuki
- Designers: Tsutae Sakurai; Yutaka Kambe; Satoshi Kawabata
- Programmers: Hideyuki Soumiya; Yasushi Sugiyama; Tomohiro Suzuki
- Composer: Soregashi
- Series: Ed, Edd n Eddy
- Platform: Nintendo DS
- Release: NA: October 23, 2007; AU: November 1, 2007; EU: November 30, 2007
- Genre: Action
- Mode: Single-player

Ed, Edd n Eddy: Scam of the Century is a 2007 action platformer video game developed by Japanese developer Art Co., Ltd and published by D3 Publisher for the Nintendo DS. The game is based on the Cartoon Network animated series Ed, Edd n Eddy. It was released on October 23, 2007, in North America, on November 1, 2007, in Australia, and on November 30, 2007, in Europe. In the game, the Eds run the risk of having their scams turned on them by the other kids in the neighborhood. Many of the objects and characters, as well as the visual style, borrow heavily from the cartoon.

This is also the last game based on the series. Previous releases include Ed, Edd n Eddy: Jawbreakers! in 2002 and Ed, Edd n Eddy: The Mis-Edventures in 2005. The game received generally poor reviews from critics.

== Gameplay ==
Ed during an early level in the game.

Each Ed has his own set of levels to complete. They are all side-scrolling fare, but each Ed has his own style of movement and attacks. Edd throws dictionaries, Ed slams his head down on the enemies, and Eddy spits his gum at enemies (although this freezes the enemy, it does not defeat them). Item pick-ups can be activated on the touch-screen.

On top of the platforming elements, the game contains a number of unlockable mini-games, including "Whack a Zit", where players tap at rising pimples on Ed's back before they burst. There is also a pie-throwing challenge where players flick the desserts up at enemies on the top screen. The game features 13 total stages, special attacks using the touch screen, the option to blow into the microphone to bring characters back to life, three side story mini-games, and special items.

== Plot ==
Ed, Edd, and Eddy are trudging home from their school, when Eddy suddenly notices that his school bag feels a little light. Examining further, Eddy finds there is a hole in it and all of his stuff is gone, including his precious "Who to Scam and When" book. The neighborhood kids find the book and realize they have been scammed for years and immediately want payback.

Players take control of the Eds and must make their way through tricks, traps, angry kids, and a barrage of ammunition including soap, dirty underwear, and broccoli. Then each Ed must brainstorm, scam, or smash their way back into the cul-de-sac and ultimately battle Captain Melonhead and Splinter the Wonderwood.

== Reception ==
Reception

Review scores
| Publication | Score |
|---|---|
| GameZone | 3.4/10 |
| IGN | 4/10 |
| Modojo | 1/5 |

The game "generally unfavorable reviews" according to the review aggregator Metacritic. It was mainly praised for its presentation and faithfulness to the show, but was criticized for its unresponsive controls, poorly executed gameplay and bland minigames.
