= Ed, Edd n Eddy: Jawbreakers! =

2002 side-scrolling video game

- North American box art
- Developer: Climax Group
- Publisher: BAM! Entertainment
- Director: Brett Skogen
- Producers: Heidi Behrendt; Mitchell Slater
- Programmers: Gianluca Cancelmi; Andrew Coates
- Artist: Erik Casey
- Composer: Rockett Music
- Series: Ed, Edd n Eddy
- Platform: Game Boy Advance
- Release: NA: March 25, 2003; EU: 2003
- Genre: Side-scrolling
- Mode: Single-player

Ed, Edd n Eddy: Jawbreakers! is a 2D side-scrolling video game developed by Climax Group and published by BAM! Entertainment, with European distribution handled by Acclaim Entertainment. It was released exclusively for the Game Boy Advance on March 25, 2003. Based on Cartoon Network's animated television series Ed, Edd n Eddy, the game mirrors Ed, Edd, and Eddy's television quest to make money to buy jawbreakers. Press outlets compared the gameplay to The Lost Vikings.

Jawbreakers! received mostly poor reviews from critics upon its release. Cartoon Network later released two other games based on the animated series: Ed, Edd n Eddy: The Mis-Edventures in 2005 for Game Boy Advance, GameCube, Microsoft Windows, PlayStation 2, and Xbox and Ed, Edd n Eddy: Scam of the Century for Nintendo DS in 2007.

== Gameplay ==
Eddy platforming through various obstacles in the game.

Players control the Eds, the series' titular characters, to collect tickets for a raffle to win a lifetime supply of jawbreakers. Ed, Edd (called Double D), and Eddy use resourceful means to earn money, solve physical puzzles, interact with neighborhood children, and find hidden goodies across 29 levels. Players control one Ed at a time, each with his own unique strength and weakness, and may dynamically cycle through the three main characters. Each of the Eds has unique abilities: Ed can head-butt; Double D can use a slingshot or a wrench and activate context-sensitive switches; and Eddy can use a hypnotizing wheel or a jetpack. Some of the levels feature cut-scenes at their beginnings and conclusions.

== Release ==
On June 21, 2002, Crave Entertainment announced that it had acquired the rights to create an Ed, Edd n Eddy video game, which they were developing for the Game Boy Advance. Featuring characters from the series in a plot around a lifetime jawbreaker giveaway along with animated cutscenes, the game's announcement included a tentative release date in late 2002. On April 3, 2003, BAM! Entertainment announced that it had shipped Jawbreakers! to retailers.

== Reception ==
Reception

Aggregate score
Aggregator	Score
Metacritic	49/100

Ed, Edd n Eddy: Jawbreakers! received "generally unfavorable reviews" according to the review aggregator Metacritic, which rated it 49 out of 100 based on five critic reviews. IGN's Craig Harris criticized the game's lack of a tutorial as well as the game's timing, as its blueprints are based on The Lost Vikings, which was shipped as a Game Boy Advance conversion only a week before Jawbreakers!'s release. Others complained of lack of indication as to time necessary to complete levels coupled with each level's time limit. Its review in the magazine Nintendo Power noted, "Since the characters have unusual strides, the movement can be slow and unpredictable."
