= Voicebox Productions =

Canadian audio production company

- Type: Private
- Industry: Voice recording, TV production
- Founded: March 1999
- Founder: Lana Carson
- Headquarters: Vancouver, British Columbia
- Key people: Terry Klassen (voice director)
- Owner: Lana Carson
- Website: Official site

Voicebox Productions is a Canadian audio production company located in Vancouver, British Columbia. It specializes in animation voice over by handling the logistics of casting, directing, payroll and working with local recording studios. Lana Carson opened the company in March 1999. Voicebox is best known for its work on the Barbie film series and television shows like Ed, Edd n Eddy, Johnny Test and My Little Pony: Friendship is Magic.

== Productions ==
=== Television series ===
==== Animation ====
- Ed, Edd n Eddy (1999–2008)
- D'Myna Leagues (2000–2004)
- What About Mimi? (2000–2002)
- Something Else (2001)
- Aaagh! It's the Mr. Hell Show! (2001–2002)
- Yvon of the Yukon (2001–2004)
- The Cramp Twins (2001–2006)
- ¡Mucha Lucha! (2002–2005)
- Yakkity Yak (2002–2003)
- Kelly Dream Club (2002–2003)
- Being Ian (2005–2007)
- Firehouse Tales (2005–2006)
- Krypto the Superdog (2005–2006)
- Class of the Titans (2005–2008)
- Johnny Test (2005–2014)
- Pucca (2006–2008)
- Finley the Fire Engine (2006)
- George of the Jungle (2007–2008; season 1)
- Jibber Jabber (2007)
- Ricky Sprocket: Showbiz Boy (2007–2009)
- Martha Speaks (2008–2014)
- Kid vs. Kat (2008–2011)
- Shelldon (2009–2012)
- Zigby (2009–2013)
- My Little Pony: Friendship Is Magic (2010–2019)
- 1001 Nights (2011–2012)
- Littlest Pet Shop (2012–2016)
- Maya the Bee (2012; season 1)
- Packages from Planet X (2013–2014)
- Nerds and Monsters (2014; season 1)
- Dr. Dimensionpants (2014–2015)

==== Anime ====
- Chibi Maruko-chan (1990)
- Transformers: Armada (2003)
- Transformers: Energon (2004)
- Transformers: Cybertron (2005)
- Zoids: Fuzors (2003)

=== Films ===
- Lion of Oz (2000)
- Barbie in the Nutcracker (2001)
- Cardcaptors: The Movie (2002)
- Barbie as Rapunzel (2002)
- Hot Wheels: World Race (2003)
- G.I. Joe: Spy Troops (2003)
- Barbie of Swan Lake (2003)
- Polly Pocket: Lunar Eclipse (2003)
- Imaginext: Fortress of the Dragon (2003)
- My Scene: Jammin' in Jamaica (2004)
- G.I. Joe: Valor vs. Venom (2004)
- My Scene: Masquerade Madness (2004)
- G.I. Joe: Ninja Battles (2004)
- Barbie as the Princess and the Pauper (2004)
- Dragons: Fire and Ice (2004)
- Barbie: Fairytopia (2005)
- My Scene Goes Hollywood: The Movie (2005)
- Polly Pocket: 2 Cool at the Pocket Plaza (2005)
- Barbie and the Magic of Pegasus (2005)
- Dragons II: The Metal Ages (2005)
- Barbie: Mermaidia (2006)
- The Barbie Diaries (2006)
- PollyWorld (2006)
- Mosaic (2007)
- The Condor (2007)
- Barbie Fairytopia: Magic of the Rainbow (2007)
- My Little Pony: Equestria Girls (2013)
- Barbie: Mariposa and the Fairy Princess (2013)
- My Little Pony: Equestria Girls – Rainbow Rocks (2014)
- Barbie in Princess Power (2015)
- My Little Pony: Equestria Girls – Friendship Games (2015)
- Ratchet & Clank (2016)
- My Little Pony: Equestria Girls – Legend of Everfree (2016)
- My Little Pony: The Movie (2017)

=== Television specials ===
- Timothy Tweedle: The First Christmas Elf (2000)
- Ed, Edd n Eddy's Big Picture Show (2009)
- Mighty Mighty Monsters in Halloween Havoc (2013)
- Mighty Mighty Monsters in New Fears Eve (2013)
- Mighty Mighty Monsters in Pranks for the Memories (2015)
- My Little Pony: Equestria Girls (2017)
