= List of Shakugan no Shana characters =

An illustration of the characters of Shakugan no Shana

The Japanese light novel, manga, and anime series Shakugan no Shana features a cast of characters created by Yashichiro Takahashi and Noizi Ito.

== Main characters ==
=== Yuji Sakai ===
Voiced by: Satoshi Hino (Japanese); Kristian Ayre (Season 1), Jessie James Grelle (Seasons 2-3, Film) (English)
Yuji Sakai (坂井 悠二, Sakai Yūji) is a high school student who, as Kentaro reveals following Chigusa's pregnancy, had an older twin brother who died at birth; in honor of him, his parents named him Yuji, which means "second (child) who shall live long". One day, he discovers that he is a Torch who has already died and has little time left before he disappears. However, he is a Mystes who contains the "Midnight Lost Child" (零時迷子, Reiji Maigo), a Treasure Tool which restores his Power of Existence each midnight. Because of this, he can live a regular lifespan as long as his Power of Existence does not run out before midnight, but it is unknown whether he will age normally or be immortal. Yuji is training to use his Power of Existence in hopes of fighting alongside Shana, which is later revealed to be equal to that of a Crimson Lord because Hecate altered his Power. After learning of his status as a Torch, Yuji develops a somewhat optimistic, yet fatalistic outlook on life. He puts others' needs before himself and justifies his acts of heroism with the belief that even if his existence is eventually extinguished, his sacrifices will be proof that he once lived. Although Yuji initially lacks the training and discipline of a Flame Haze, he makes up for this through his intellect, as he thinks outside the box and solves issues in ways that others would not. Over time, Yuji's training enables him to avoid most attacks even from Flame Hazes as skilled as Shana and Wilhelmina, and he gains the ability to cast Power of Unrestraint. He also wields Blutsauger and can infuse it with some of his power, as well as attack with silver fire.
When Yuji first activates the Seal on his own, the silver flames are an omen of the Snake of the Festival's return, as the God of Creation, which is revealed to be the Snake himself, created the flames to collect the elements needed for his resurrection. It is revealed that there are two entities inside the Midnight Lost Child: Johan, Pheles' lover and its creator, and the Snake of the Festival, a Crimson Lord who is one of the Crimson Realm's true gods and Bal Masqué's founder/true leader. Later, Pheles' second attempt to free Johan causes the Snake to awaken and he merges with Yuji, demanding that his subordinates refer to him as their new leader. As a result, others are confused as to his true intentions, as it is difficult to distinguish which actions are Yuji's will of Yuji and which are the Snake's. As the Snake plans to create Xanadu, a new world between the two realms which would allow the Denizens and Crimson Lords to live peacefully and end the conflict between the Flame Hazes and Bal Masqué, Shana and her allies oppose his plan, fearing that Xanadu's eventual collapse would further degrade the balance between the worlds. In the final battle, Yuji uses his own Unrestricted Spell, which he primarily uses as a shield, but its versatility is bound only by his will. When Lamia enters Xanadu after fulfilling his wish, she grants Yuji a new Unrestricted Spell, Grammatica, which restores his existence after he accepts Shana's feelings and they kiss, making him human again. With the help of another spell from Lamia, Yuji restores the humans in Misaki City whose existence the Denizens absorbed before departing for Xanadu with Shana.

=== Shana ===
Voiced by: Rie Kugimiya (Japanese); Tabitha St. Germain (Season 1), Cherami Leigh (Seasons 2-3, Film) (English)
Shana (シャナ) is a Flame Haze known as the "Flame-Haired Red-Hot-Eyed Hunter" (「炎髪灼眼の討ち手」, "Enpatsu Shakugan no Uchite"), who hunts the Denizens and contracted with Alastor, who calls her "The Great One". Her mentor and guardian is Wilhelmina Carmel. She generally treats most people with ignorance and indifference, with the exception of Chigusa Sakai, to whom she looks as a source of answers when Alastor or Wilhelmina cannot. At first, she focuses solely on her duty as a Flame Haze and is indifferent towards humans, choosing not to have a name until Yuji names her Shana after her weapon, a nodachi called the Nietono no Shana (贄殿遮那; "Vairocana of the Offering Room"), and seeing him only as a Torch notable for his status as a Mystes. Despite her harsh attitude towards Yuji, she genuinely cares for him as she slowly opens up to him and comes to see him as a person, eventually falling in love with him while competing with Kazumi Yoshida for his love. Shana is said to be the most powerful Flame Haze, who most Denizens known and fear. She has various abilities, including proficiency with the Nietono no Shana, psychic abilities, wielding flames and the Power of Existence, and flying with wings of flame. After the final battle, Yuji accepts Shana's feelings and asks her to be with him in Xanadu, which she accepts.

=== Alastor ===
Voiced by: Masashi Ebara (Japanese); Paul Dobson (Season 1), Kent Williams (Seasons 2-3, Film) (English)
Alastor (アラストール, Arasutōru) is the Crimson Realm's Lord and one of its true gods, who Shana contracted with, and is known as the "Flame of the Heavens" (「天壌の劫火」, "Tenjō no Gōka"). He expresses his will through a divine vessel called the Cocytus, which, in Shana's case, takes the form of a pendant. Alastor is considered to be among the strongest of the Crimson Lords and Denizens, but despite his power, he tries to keep the Denizens from consuming the Power of Existence. Unlike other Crimson Lords who have a Flame Haze, his contractor can perform Divine Summoning (神威召喚 Shin'i Shoukan, God's Power Summoning), a method called Heaven Destruction Earth Break (天破壌砕, Tenpa Jyōsai), which requires a lot of Power of Existence and will manifest his being as the God of Atonement (天罰神, Tenbatsushin) in the form of a giant minotaur to consume Denizens around him. This method is his Flame Haze's last resort, as prior to Shana, no Flame Haze had survived after using it. Alastor and Shana seem to have a parent-child dynamic at first, but he is aware that Shana must grow up and adapt to the world.

=== Snake of the Festival ===
Voiced by: Show Hayami (Japanese); Bruce Carey (English)
The Snake of the Festival (「祭礼の蛇」, Sairei no Hebi) is a Crimson Lord and one of the Crimson Realm's true gods, who is known as the "God of Creation" (創造神, Sōzōshin), and Bal Masqué's leader, who was contracted to Yuji after merging with him. Although he has a kind and noble side that he shows to his comrades and subjects, he is cruel and willing to do whatever it takes to ensure that his plans come to fruition. Long ago, he received many prayers from Denizens to create a world for themselves, which he answered by initiating the ritual to build a world called the "Great Chained" (大縛鎖, Daibakusa), which was to be a paradise for Denizens. However, the process required many human lives to complete using their Power of Existence, and the ancient Flame Hazes, including Tis and Khamsin, intercepted and disrupted the ritual. causing a distortion that sealed the Snake in the rift between the worlds. The Snake's Divine Summoning, Saiki Reisō (祭基礼創), unleashes his power as the God of Creation and summons his power over Creation and Settlement to create anything. However, it requires a large amount of Power of Existence, which is why Bal Masqué seeks the Midnight Lost Child. Like other summonings, it requires a sacrifice; when it is used to create Xanadu, Hecate is used as the sacrifice.

== Humans ==
=== Misaki High School students ===
Kazumi Yoshida (吉田 一美, Yoshida Kazumi)
Voiced by: Ayako Kawasumi (Japanese); Chantal Strand (Season 1), Brina Palencia (Seasons 2-3, film, OVAs) (English)
Yuji's classmate, who has a crush on him but is too shy to confess her feelings. She is initially unaware of Shana's true nature and her relationship with Yuji, but after Shana becomes her rival for his love, she vows to tell Yuji her feelings and let him decide between her and Shana; however, he ultimately rejects her. Her life changes after she meets Khamsin Nbh'w, a Flame Haze who asks for her help in tuning the distortions in the city. After revealing the truth of the world to her, Khamsin gives Kazumi eyeglasses that can detect Torches after realizing that she is concerned about his status as a Torch, which she confirms during the Misago Festival. However, after Yuji reveals that the Midnight Lost Child prevents him from disappearing, she finally accepts his status.
Kazumi carries a small relic that Khamsin gave her when they first met which enables her to move within a Seal. As well, Pheles gave Kazumi a cross-shaped Treasure Tool which can summon him, but at the cost of taking her Power of Existence. During Xanadu's creation, Kazumi uses the Treasure Tool to summon Pheles to stop the fight between Yuji and Shana, and somehow survives. Later. she has a dream in which Pheles reveals to her that he felt guilty for not letting Wilhelmina come with her and that because Johan no longer has the Midnight Lost Child, he is now a Torch and will disappear soon, and wants to pass on his hope. Pheles then approaches Kazumi, but disappears as she awakens from the dream. Yuji later uses her memories to revive Yukari and restore order in Misaki City.
Keisaku Satou (佐藤 啓作, Satō Keisaku)
Voiced by: Kenji Nojima (Japanese); Brad Swaile (Season 1), Greg Ayres (Seasons 2-3, film, OVAs) (English)
Eita's friend, whom Margery Daw chooses along with Eita to be her guides when she arrives in Misaki City. After finding the Crystal Altar, a magical map to the city that Friagne once used, they often act as support. Coming from a wealthy family and being independent of his parents, his home becomes a place for Margery to stay. He and Eita both have feelings for Margery, but he hides his feelings; however, after Margery betrays him, he shows more intense feelings than Eita. Keisaku sees Yuji as a rival, especially after he leans that Shana and Wilhelmina are training him. However, he eventually accepts that he does not have to be like Yuji and instead decides to study harder by changing schools so that he can work at the Outlaw and support Margery in ways other than fighting. Later on, after Eita informs him that Margery has collapsed and is in a coma, he returns to Misaki City to confess his love for her.
Eita Tanaka (田中 栄太, Tanaka Eita)
Voiced by: Takayuki Kondō (Japanese); Alistair Abell (Season 1), Ian Sinclair (Seasons 2-3, film, OVAs) (English)
Keisaku's classmate, whom Margery Daw chooses along with Keisaku to be her guides when she arrives in Misaki City. After finding the Crystal Altar, a magical map to the city that Friagne once used, they often act as support. Both he and Keisaku have feelings for Margery, but his feelings are more obvious than Keisaku's and he has also shown affection for Matake. When a battle occurs at the school festival, Matake is seriously injured during Margery's rampage while inside the Seal. Afterwards, Eita decides to distance himself from the events concerning the Denizens and parts ways with Satou and Margery.
Hayato Ike (池 速人, Ike Hayato)
Voiced by: Hirofumi Nojima (Japanese); Matthew Erickson (Season 1), Joel McDonald (Seasons 2-3, film, OVAs) (English)
Yuji's friend since junior high school, who has feelings for Kazumi but rarely competes with Yuji for her affection, and often gives her advice and helps her show her feelings for Yuji. He is intelligent and often unavailable because he has to study or take extra classes outside of school. He is more emotionally aware than Yuji and often points out to him that his desire to help girls is admirable, but causes pain to others, especially Shana and Kazumi. He finally confesses his feelings for Kazumi on Christmas Eve after asking her out.
Matake Ogata (緒方 真竹, Ogata Matake)
Voiced by: Yumiko Kobayashi (Japanese); Nicole Bouma (Season 1), Brittney Karbowski (Seasons 2-3, film, OVAs) (English)
Yuji's classmate. A tomboy who is strong-willed and physically active, and skilled at playing volleyball. She has feelings for Eita and worries about his well-being, and becomes jealous of Margery Daw because of her closeness to Eita. She and Eita later become a couple, and he is determined to live a normal life without worrying about the Denizens.

Fumina Konoe (近衛 史菜, Konoe Fumina)
A transfer student who bonds with Yuji and makes Shana and Yoshida uneasy. She bears an uncanny resemblance to Hecate, and it is later revealed that she is a vessel Hecate created to keep an eye on the Midnight Lost Child and seal the Silver if it attempts to escape, as well as to collect the memories of her interactions with Yuji and the others. However, Konoe's memories seem to have given Hecate human feelings, making her hesitate to shoot Yuji at the last moment and helping Yuji and Shanato defeat the Taimei Shihen, leaving Hecate to wonder what had overcome her.
Yukari Hirai (平井 ゆかり, Hirai Yukari)
Voiced by: Masumi Asano (Japanese); Ashleigh Ball (TV Series), Alison Viktorin (film) (English)
Yuji's classmate, who is upbeat and kind. She has feelings for Hayato and is implied to have feelings for Yuji. She died after a Rinne attacked her on her way home, and despite Shana making a Torch of her, her flame burned out the next day and she disappeared. Before her flame went out, Yuji tried to give her the best last day of her life and convinced Hayato to hang out with her. They took a photo together, from which she disappeared after her flame burned out, and sat on a hill watching the sunset, at which point her existence completely faded away, teaching Yuji a valuable lesson about his inability to affect the world. Shana uses a remnant of Yukari's existence to shift the perception of others, causing them to perceive her as Yukari. She is resurrected after the city is restored.

=== Sakai family ===
Chigusa Sakai (坂井 千草, Sakai Chigusa)
Voiced by: Tomo Sakurai (Japanese); Lalainia Lindbjerg (Season 1), Lydia Mackay (Seasons 2-3, film, OVAs) (English)
Yuji's mother, whose husband Kantaro works out of the country; he implies that she was raised in an orphanage. Although she is unaware of Shana and Yuji's true nature, she becomes a source of advice for Shana in matters that Alastor cannot advise her on, with him acknowledging her wisdom after a phone call between them. Described as a woman who can accept anything, she seems to have no problem with Shana visiting Yuji under the pretext of "training". She also teaches Shana how to cook and make bento, as she is jealous of Kazumi's ability to make bento, but her attempts to teach Wilhelmina end in disaster. She later becomes pregnant with a child.
Kantaro Sakai (坂井 貫太郎, Sakai Kantarō)
Voiced by: Keiji Fujiwara (Japanese); Chuck Huber (English)
Yuji's father, who married Chigusa when they were students, marrying early because Chigusa was pregnant. He works outside the country, but often returns home to visit. Despite his skinny figure, his athletic senses are good enough to retaliate against a flying kick from Shana, who mistook him for an enemy, and his tracking and investigation skills are so good that Shana is unable to follow him. While rescuing Yuji from Wilhelmina, he tricks her with borrowed mascot suits.
Miyu Sakai (坂井三悠, Sakai Miyu)
The third child of Kantarō and Chigusa and Yūji's younger sister, who is introduced in the last episode of the anime and in the short story Future from volume SIII. She was born after the final fight in Misaki City between Yūji and Shana, so they never had the chance to meet her. Kazumi and Ogata occasionally visit the Sakai residence to take care of Miyu. She was named Miyu because of the "distant sound" that Kantaro and Chigusa heard during the final battle, with her full name having an implied meaning of 'the third child who will live long'.

== Mystes ==
Tenmoku Ikko (天目 一個, "The One Celestial Eye")
Voiced by: Takayuki Sugo (Japanese); Mark Gibbon (Season 1), Chuck Huber (Season 3) (English)
A Mystes who is known as "the worst Mystes in history" or "monster torch". He is an ancient swordsmith who, unlike other Mystes, consumed a Crimson Denizen to become one and willingly chose to in order to find someone worthy of wielding the Nietono no Shana, which he forged with the help of a Crimson Lord to be superior to all other weapons. Shana received it after defeating him, and he later returns to rescue her after she is imprisoned in Serei-den and return it to her.
Johan (ヨーハン, Yōhan) / "Eternal Lover"
Voiced by: Mitsuki Saiga (Japanese); John Burgmeier (English)
The former Mystes of the Midnight Lost Child. When he was an infant, Pheles murdered his father, who attempted to sacrifice him for a Power of Unrestraint to gain eternal youth, and fled with him to wander the world. As she raised Johan, she expected his heart to be corrupted like his father's, but as he grew older, he fell in love with her. Together, they are known as the "Engaged Link". The Midnight Lost Child was created to give Johan eternal life, and Pheles stopped consuming humans. After being reborn as a Mystes, he trained and mastered the Power of Unrestraint, which was enhanced by his ability to sense Power of Existence. After he was mortally wounded in battle with Sabrac, Pheles sealed him inside the Midnight Lost Child, which came to be inside Yūji, but was unaware that Sabrac had also placed the Silver into it.
After Pheles awakens him after Kazumi summons her to the battlefield, he appears before Yūji and the Snake of the Festival and introduces himself to them. He thanks Kazumi for getting Pheles to grant his wish and reveals that she felt bad about not letting Wilhelmina come with her. He also reveals that since he no longer has the Midnight Lost Child, he is now a Torch and will soon disappear, and wants to pass on his hope. It is later revealed that Johan and Pheles used their Power of Existence to bore Justus, the Heir to Both Worlds, and that Johan's message to Kazumi was for Wilhelmina to take care of Justus.

== Flame Hazes ==
Margery Daw (マージョリー・ドー, Mājorī Dō) / "Chanter of Elegies" (「弔詞の詠み手」, "Chōshi no Yomite")
Voiced by: Hitomi Nabatame (Japanese); Janyse Jaud (Season 1), Colleen Clinkenbeard (Seasons 2-3, film, OVAs) (English)
A Flame Haze with a drinking habit who became a Flame Haze to get revenge on a Denizen with a silver-colored flame who is connected to the Midnight Lost Child. She uses the Grimoire, the divine vessel through which Marchosias, to whom she is bound, expresses his will. Her specialty seems to be Power of Unrestraint, and her powers mainly focus on casting spells through an "Improvisational Poem of Slaughter" (屠殺の即興詩, Tosatsu no Sokkyōshi) as well as transforming into a werewolf. Eita and Keisaku look up to her because she once saved their lives, and in turn she chooses them as her guides upon arriving in Misaki City. It is later revealed that her drinking habit is a way of coping with her past, as she lived in medieval times and was the daughter of a landlord who was betrayed and killed, after which she ended up working in a brothel. She was given the opportunity for revenge, only to have the Silver destroy her enemies; her anger at having her only remaining reason for living stolen drew the attention of Marchosias. In the anime, Margery's focus gradually shifts from fighting solely to eradicate the Crimson Denizens to fighting to protect the Balance. In the light novels, after losing a battle with the Silver, she realizes that they were acting on her desire for revenge, causing her to despair and fall into a coma. She eventually recovers after Keisaku kisses her and confesses his love for her, giving her a new reason to live.
Wilhelmina Carmel (ヴィルヘルミナ・カルメル, Viruherumina Karumeru) / "Manipulator of Objects" (「万条の仕手」, "Banjō no Shite") ("Specialist of Everything" in the English anime)
Voiced by: Shizuka Itō (Japanese); Anna Cummer (Season 1), Carli Mosier (Seasons 2-3, film, OVAs) (English)
A polite and formal girl who usually wears a maid's uniform and is contracted to Tiamat, whose will resides in the divine vessel Persona, which took the form of a tiara during the Great War and currently takes the form of a headband out of battle and a mask in battle. She is one of the great Flame Haze from the age of the Great War, who fought alongside her friend Mathilde Saint-Omer, the previous holder of the title of "Flame-Haired Red-Hot-Eyed Hunter". She has the ability to control ribbons that appear from around her and is skilled at many things, including singing and housework, and takes care of Shana during her training at Tendōkyū. However, she is not good at cooking. Wilhelmina dislikes Yuji, often suggesting that she kill him to prevent the Bal Masqué from obtaining the Midnight Lost Child and constantly referring to him as "the Mystes", though she later comes to call him by his name. She also becomes Yuji's training partner when Shana is unavailable.
Khamsin Nbh'w (カムシン・ネブハーウ, Kamushin Nebuhāu) / "Mobilizer of Ceremonial Equipment" (「儀装の駆り手」, "Gisō no Karite")
Voiced by: Junko Minagawa (Japanese); Cathy Weseluck (Season 1), Todd Haberkorn (Seasons 2-3) (English)
A Flame Haze who is contracted to Behemoth and is among the oldest Flame Haze. He was once a prince who aspired to be a great warrior and became a Flame Haze to fight the Denizens, but was forgotten by everyone as the price of the contract. Despite being a Flame Haze, Khamsin's primary function is not to fight the Denizens, but rather to act as a tuner to dispel the distortions caused by battles between them and the Flame Hazes. However, he is capable of fighting and has the ability to create stone creatures that resemble golems. He meets Kazumi after asking her to help him tune the distortions in the city, and, after revealing the truth of the world to her, gives her eyeglasses that can detect Torches. He later dies after being fatally wounded by explosions caused by the death of the Seeking Researcher in the final stages of the Second Great War.
Sophie Sawallisch (ゾフィー・サバリッシュ, Zofii Sabarisshu) / "Braider of Trembling Might" (「震威の結い手」, "Shin'i no Yuite")
Voiced by: Masako Katsuki (Japanese); Pam Dougherty (English)
A Flame Haze who is contracted to Takemikazuchi. She is a veteran of the Great War and the supreme commander of the Flame Haze Army, who is known as Mother Courage for her kindness to the other Flame Hazes. Despite her calm nature, she is powerful and can brandish a purple flame which resemble bolts of lightning, In the past, she met Shana in Eastern Europe and taught her how to be a Flame Haze .
Ernest Flieder (アーネスト・フリーダー, Aanesuto Furiidaa) / "Transposer of Corpses and Bodies" (「骸軀の換え手」, "Gaiku no Kaete")
Voiced by: Kenji Hamada (Japanese); Mark Stoddard (English)
A Flame Haze who is contracted to Brigid and who Sophie assigns as the commander of the Tokyo Outlaw Headquarters during the Second Great War. He has the ability to change the density of his body to hide or pass through solid objects. Despite his power and fame, he rarely fights head-on, preferring to deceive and ambush his enemies.
Rebecca Reed (レベッカ・リード, Rebekka Riido) / "Scatterer of Sparkling Light" (「輝爍の撒き手」, "Kishaku no Makite")
Voiced by: Houko Kuwashima (Japanese); Trina Nishimura (English)
A Flame Haze who is contracted to Balar. She is an old friend of Wilhelmina and has a strong sense of duty, as she chooses to help her save Shana instead of aiding the Outlaw branch at Tokyo. She has the ability to shoot explosive bursts of Existence.
Chiara Toscana (キアラ•トスカナ, Kiara Tosukana) / "Archer of Aurora" (「極光の射手」, "Kyokkō no Ite")
Voiced by: Ai Kayano (Japanese); Carrie Savage (English)
A Flame Haze who is contracted to Outreniaia/Vetcherniaia. She was Sale's pupil and currently his partner, who has the ability to ride around on a large green arrow at high speeds. Both she and Sale join Shana and the others in the battle against Bal Masque in Misaki City.
Sale Habichtsburg (サーレ・ハビヒツブルグ, Saare Habihitsuburugu) / "Puppeteer of Devilish Skills" (「鬼功の繰り手」, Kikō no Kurite)
Voiced by: Shinobu Matsumoto (Japanese); Christopher Bevins (English)
A Flame Haze who is contracted to Gizo. He has the ability to manipulate invisible strings around him, which he uses the vessels Länge and Saite to do so.
François Auric (フランソワ・オーリック, Furansowa Ōrikku) / "Conveyor of Posture" (「姿影の派し手」, "Shiei no Hashite")
Voiced by: Yoshitsugu Matsuoka (Japanese); Micah Solusod (English)
A Flame Haze who is contracted to Grogach. He was a scout during the Great War and provided battlefield and terrain analysis for Sophie during the Second Great War. His ability over water allows him to use rivers for long distance communication and has limited control over the weather.
East Edge (イーストエッジ, Īsuto Ejji) / "Summoner of Star River" (「星河の喚び手」, "Seiga no Yobite")
Voiced by: Kenji Nomura (Japanese); Andrew Chandler (English)
A Flame Haze who is contracted with Quetzalcóatl. He is one of The Four Gods of Earth and runs the Outlaws, an organization which is disguised as a news agency in New York. In the nineteenth century, the Four Gods and their comrades sought to destroy the United States' government in order to liberate their fellow Native Americans, who had suffered as others encroached on their land. Many Flame Haze acted to stop them, leading to a civil war between the two groups. However, the balance of the world had collapsed and the Denizens were able to act as they pleased. The Four Gods had no choice but to abandon the plan and became the keepers of the four Outlaw branches.
Yuri Chvojka (ユーリイ・フヴォイカ, Yurī Fuvoika) / "Hauler of Prevailing Ghouls" (「魑勢の牽き手」, "Chisei no Hikite")
Voiced by: Yūko Sanpei (Japanese); Sean Michael Teague (English)
A Flame Haze who is contracted to Valac. He has the power to command small animals and insects as messengers and spies or wrap himself inside them for flight. He was a Ukrainian immigrant who was on a voyage to America when the ship was attacked by a Kraken. As he was dying, he contracted with Valac and defeated the Denizen, but was unable to save his family and the other passengers. After reaching America, he worked under East Edge. Unlike most Flame Hazes, he does not seek revenge and is willing to sacrifice himself to protect others. He later meets Margery and tries to assist her, but was rejected. Despite this, he enters battle and defeats Annaberg to save Margery, but dies after Sydonay fatally wounds him.
Samuel Demantius (ザムエル・デマンティウス, Zamueru Demantiusu) / "Guardian of Steady Passage" (「犀渠の護り手」, "Saikyo no Morite")
Voiced by: Akio Nojima (Japanese); R Bruce Elliott (English)
A Flame Haze who is contracted to Zirnitra and has been an active Flame Haze for over 600 years. He was a military commander in the Flame Haze Army during the Second Great War and came up with its name during the First Great War. He has the ability to create stone structures such as bridges or castles. He died after being fatally wounded defending an objective during the Second Great War.

== Lords of the Crimson Realm ==
Marchosias (マルコシアス, Marukoshiasu) / "Fangs of Devastation" (「蹂躙の爪牙」, "Jūrin no Sōga")
Voiced by: Mitsuo Iwata (Japanese); Trevor Devall (Season 1), Justin Cook (Seasons 2-3, film) (English)
A Crimson Lord who is contracted with Margery Daw. He expresses his will through the divine vessel Grimoire, which takes the form of a book. Although he is blunt and often teases her, he genuinely cares for her.
Tiamat (ティアマトー, Tiamatō) / "Illusionist Crown" (「夢幻の冠帯」, "Mugen no Kantai")
Voiced by: Akeno Watanabe (Japanese); Lisa Ann Beley (Season 1), Clarine Harp (Seasons 2-3, OVAs) (English)
A Crimson Lord who is contracted with Wilhelmina, who is stoic and often emotionless. She expresses her will through the divine vessel Persona, which took the form of a tiara during the Great War and currently takes the form of a headband out of battle and a mask in battle.
Behemoth (ベヘモット, Behemotto) / "Steadfast Sharp Peak" (「不抜の尖嶺」, "Fubatsu no Senrei")
Voiced by: Katsuhisa Houki (Japanese); Colin Murdock (Season 1), Christopher Sabat (Season 3) (English)
A Crimson Lord who is contracted with Khamsin, who expresses his will through a divine vessel which takes the form of a bracelet that Khamsin wears. His mission does not seem to be to protect the balance of the worlds by hunting the Denizens, but rather by re-tuning places with distortions, such as Misaki City.
Takemikazuchi (タケミカヅチ, Takemikazuchi) / "Thunder Blade of Banishment" (「払の雷剣」, "Futsu no Raiken")
Voiced by: Hirofumi Nojima (Japanese); Joel McDonald (English)
A Crimson Lord who is contracted with Sophie. He expresses his will through a divine vessel called the Donner, which takes the form of a blue star-shaped cross on Sophie's headdress.
Brigid (ブリギット, Burigitto) / "Arts and Crafts of Application" (「応化の伎芸」, "Ouka no Gigei")
Voiced by: Natsumi Takamori (Japanese); Kara Edwards (English)
A Crimson Lord who is contracted with Ernest. She expresses her will through a divine vessel called the Ambrosia, which takes the form of a red flower accessory attached to Ernest's white suit.
Balar (バラル, Bararu) / "Widened Eye of Pulverization" (「糜砕の裂眥」, "Bisai no Ressei")
Voiced by: Keita Toide (Japanese); J. Michael Tatum (English)
A Crimson Lord who is contracted with Rebecca. He expresses his will through a divine vessel called the Cruach, which takes the form of a golden bracelet that Rebecca wears.
Outreniaia and Vetcherniaia (ウートレンニャヤ&ヴェチェールニャヤ, Ūtorennyaya & Biechērunyaya) / "Forerunner of Daybreak" and "Successor of Twilight" (「破暁の先駆」&「夕暮の後塵 」, "Hagyō no Senku" & "Sekibo no Kōjin")
Voiced by: Ikumi Hayama (Japanese); Morgan Garrett (English)
A Crimson Lord with dual personalities who is contracted with Chiara. They express their will through their divine vessel, which take the form of arrowheads that Chiara wears as hair accessories; in battle, they become the tips of the aurora-colored bow she wields.
Gizo (ギゾー, Gizō) / "Gorgeous Hanging Strings" (絢の羂挂, Aya no Kenkei)
Voiced by: Kiyohito Yoshikai (Japanese); Jerry Jewell (English)
A Crimson Lord who is contracted with Sale. He expresses his will through Länge and Saite, divine vessels which take the form of marionette control bars. They were kept in holsters when not in use, and Sale currently keeps them in the hardskin belt he wears.
Grogach (グローガッハ, Gurōgahha) / "Miraculous Springs of Arrangement" (「布置の霊泉」, "Fuchi no Reisen")
A Crimson Lord who is contracted with Francois. She expresses her will through a divine vessel called the Splet, which takes the form of a giant urn that Francois carries on his back.
Quetzalcóatl (ケツアルコアトル, Ketsuarukoatoru) / "Windy Echo of Enlightenment" (「啓導の籟」, "Keidō no Fue")
Voiced by: Kan Tanaka (Japanese); Charlie Campbell (English)
A Crimson Lord who is contracted with East Edge. He expresses his will through a divine vessel which takes the form of an engraved stone medallion.
Valac (ウァラク, Waraku) / "Marshal of Diminutive Lizards" (「虺蜴の帥」, "Kieki no Sui")
Voiced by: Kotomi Yamakawa (Japanese); Anastasia Muñoz (English)
A Crimson Lord who is contracted with Yuri. She expresses her will through the divine vessel Goverla, which takes the form of a knife.
Zirnitra (ジルニトラ, Jirunitora) / "Peaceful Shield of One's Scales" (「吾鱗の泰盾」, "Gorin no Taijun")
A Crimson Lord who is contracted with Samuel. He expresses his will through a divine vessel which the form of a silver chalice attached to a thread, which resembles a necklace.

== Rinne and the Denizens ==
Pheles / Saihyō Firesu (「彩飄」フィレス; "Beautiful Whim") (Crimson Lord)
Voiced by: Marina Inoue (Japanese); Monica Rial (English)
A Crimson Lord who murdered an alchemist to save his son Johan, whom he wanted to sacrifice in order to gain a Power of Unrestraint, and eventually fell in love with Johan. To stay with him forever, they created the Midnight Lost Child, a Treasure Tool that can grant eternal life to its bearer. Because of its power, she does not need to consume other humans' Power of Existence, as she can get enough from Johan to survive without him being in danger of disappearing. After Johan was mortally wounded in battle against Bal Masque's assassin Sabrac, she sealed him into the Midnight Lost Child, but was unaware that Sabrac had also placed the Silver into it. Afterwards, the Midnight Lost Child was lost, and since then she has been searching for it using her Power of Unrestraint The Wheel of Wind (風の転輪, Kaze no Tenrin), a beacon that becomes a duplicate of her once the target is located. She is friends with Wilhelmina, who once she had saved from Sabrac's trap. Johan later controls Yuji's body to persuade her from sacrificing the current Mystes to bring him back, which Pheles agrees to before leaving. Before she leaves, she gives Yoshida a cross-shaped Treasure Tool called the Giralda. She later appears during Xanadu's creation after Kazumi activates the Giralda to summon her, explaining that Giralda is designed for human use and that humans can only use Treasure Tools when they are sacrificing themselves, revealing that Kazumi will not die.
Justus (ユストゥス, Yusutusu)
A child born from the combined existences of Pheles and Johan; as the first offspring of a Crimson Denizen and a human, he is known as the "Heir to Both Worlds". Pheles and Johan entrust the flask that would become Justus to Kazumi, who guards it until its completion and gives the newborn Justus to Wilhelmina. After his birth, the Xanadu ceremony summons the Crimson Lord Shaher, who announces the news of a being born of both worlds before disappearing. After being brought to Xanadu, Justus is primarily cared for by Wilhelmina and Rebecca within Tendōkyū.
Lamis / Shikabane Hiroi/Rasen no Fūkin (「屍拾い」/「螺旋の風琴」ラミー; "The Corpse Collector" / "The Spiral Organ") (Crimson Denizen)
Voiced by: Motomu Kiyokawa (Japanese); Ron Halder (Season 1), Jerry Russell (Seasons 2-3) (English)
The Torch of an old man who a Denizen controls as means of traveling in secrecy. Lamis collects the Power of Existence from Torches which are about to disappear and, unlike most Denizens, respects the balance between worlds and does not feed on humans. He is also renowned for creating the most prominent Power of Unrestraint (Jizai Hou), including the Seal. He is an old acquaintance of Alastor.
The Denizen within Lamis is Rasen no Fuukin, who in the past went under the name Leanan-sidhe and assumed the form of a young girl who fell in love with a human painter, whose discovery of her eating humans may have caused her to stop eating them. After she was captured and imprisoned by a Crimson Lord, by the time she was released, the painter, who still loved her, had died of old age. Before his death, had drawn a picture of her that became damaged beyond repair. She now seeks to gather enough Power of Existence to activate a Power of Unrestraint that would restore the painting.
Friagne / Kariudo (「狩人」フリアグネ; "The Hunter") (Crimson Lord)
Voiced by: Junichi Suwabe (Japanese); Trevor Devall (Season 1), J. Michael Tatum (Season 2, film) (English)
A Denizen who, unlike other Denizens, does not associate with organizations such as Bal Masqué. He comes to Misaki City to perform "City Devourer", a Power of Unrestraint that will give him enough Power of Existence to make Marianne a fully independent being instead of a Rinne dependent on him to exist. In his pursuit of gaining a powerful Treasure Tool, he has acquired a vast collection of Tools, but most are weak or useless. He later dies after Shana kills him. In all media except for the film, he is killed after Alastor incinerates him.
Marianne (マリアンヌ) (Rinne)
Voiced by: Kimiko Koyama (Japanese); Nicole Bouma (Season 1), Tia Ballard (Seasons 2-3, film, OVAs) (English)
One of Friagne's Rinne servants, who usually takes the form of a doll. In order to buy time for him to use "City Devourer", she fights Shana, ultimately sacrificing herself for Friagne.
Sorath / Aizenji (「愛染自」ソラト; "He who Loves Himself") (Crimson Denizen)
Voiced by: Ryōko Shiraishi (Japanese); Aidan Drummond (Season 1), Micah Solusod (Season 2) (English)
Tiriel's elder brother, who uses a Treasure Tool called the Butsuyoku and wields the Blutsauger, a sword which is capable of damaging anything that it touches if its wielder channels Power of Existence into it. He is obsessed with the Nietono no Shana and searches for it, which ultimately proves to be his undoing..
Tiriel / Aizenta (「愛染他」ティリエル; "Engulfed in Love for Others") (Crimson Denizen)
Voiced by: Yukari Tamura (Japanese); Jocelyne Loewen (Season 1), Apphia Yu (Season 2) (English)
Sorath's younger sister, who is willing to do anything to protect him, even if it means sacrificing her Power of Existence or her life. She can use a Power of Unrestraint called "Cradle Garden" with the aid of a Treasure Tool, which alters a Seal. Shana is disgusted with their way of expressing love, yet is greatly moved by her self-sacrifice.
Merihim a.k.a. Shiro / Niji no Tsubasa (「虹の翼」メリヒム; "Rainbow Wings") (Crimson Lord)
Voiced by: Katsuyuki Konishi (Japanese); Brian Drummond (Season 1), Eric Vale (Season 3) (English)
One of the nine lords that serve Toten Glocke (とむらいの鐘, Tomurai no Kane), a Denizen organization that rivals Bal-Masque and was led by the late Lord "Hitsugi no Orite" (「棺の織手」; "Weaver of Coffin") Asiz. Merihim and the draconic Lord "Kōtetsuryū" (甲鉄竜; "Iron shell dragon") Illuyanka were Asiz's most powerful subordinates and were feared as the "Pair of Wings". It was around this time that he gained the title of Niji no Kenshi (虹の剣士; "Rainbow Swordsman"). Wilhelmina is in love with him, but he is in love with Mathilde, who in turn loves Alastor. To fulfill his promise to Mathilde, he transformed into the skeleton Shana knew as Shiro and trained the next successor of the title of "Flame-Haired Blazing-Eyed Hunter".
Mare / Gisuikyō Mea (「戯睡郷」メア; "Village of Jestful Slumber") (Crimson Denizen)
Voiced by: Sanae Kobayashi (Japanese); Jamie Marchi (English)
The antagonist of the PlayStation 2 game, who also appears in the second season of the anime. She uses a Treasure Took to place Yuji into a "transient yet eternal" dream world where he relives events from his past.
Annaberg / Sentetsu no Hora Anaberugu (「穿徹の洞」アナベルグ; "Completely Piercing Cavern") (Crimson Denizen)
Voiced by: Mitsuaki Madono (Japanese); Patrick Seitz (English)
A Denizen who is fascinated by human civilization and its creations, yet is bent on destroying them in order to accelerate the speed of evolution. He has the power to create steam from his sleeves, which conceals his presence or the Power of Existence. He appeared in New York in the 1930s along with Sydonay as his bodyguard, planning to destroy the Empire State Building, but Margery and Yuri stopped him.

== Bal Masqué ==
An organization of Denizens who moved into the human world several millennia ago under the Grand Master and the God of Creation, the Sairei no Hebi (｢祭礼の蛇」; "Snake of the Festival"). Since the Flame Hazes defeated him and sealed him in the Abyss between the worlds, it has been led by three powerful figures known collectively as the Trinity and became an organization to support Denizens. Their goal is to accomplish the Grand Order, with a Power of Unrestraint called the "Psalm of Grand Order" and the Midnight Lost Child being necessary for their plans. Its subordinates are mainly classified into three roles; Wanderers, Jaegers, and Heralds.

Hecate / Itadaki no Kura Hekatē (「頂の座」ヘカテー; "Master Throne") ("Supreme Throne" in the English anime) (Crimson Lord)
Voiced by: Mamiko Noto (Japanese); Brenna O'Brien (Season 1), Lindsay Seidel (Seasons 2-3) (English)
A member of the Trinity known as the "Priestess", who Bel Peol describes as having an "eternal existence". She controls the movements of Serei-den, Bal Masqué's base, and wields a Treasure Tool called Trigon, which resembles a staff. Her position is important to Bal Masqué's plans, as she can send the Midnight Lost Child's power to everything in Seireiden. She has taken up the habit of prayer, though she has no one to pray to, often lamenting that she is 'empty'. The light novels imply that she is praying to the Snake and depict her as a leader that even Bal Masqué fears. She is skilled at using Aster, a Power of Unrestraint which shoots energy beams, and has a flute that can summon dragons made of blue flame, which she plays when announcing the end of Serei-den's anchoring.
In the anime, Hecate synchronizes with Yuji, allowing her to draw on his sense of self to fill the void within her. The true nature of this synchronization is revealed at midnight, when the Midnight Lost Child attempts to restore Yuji's Power of Existence. As a result of the synchronization, it begins to emit an infinite amount of power in an attempt to fill Hecate's capacity. She considers the feelings that she gets from synchronizing with others are hers and no longer from their owners, much like a Torch being the remainder of their original human self. However, Yuji tells her that the feelings, memories and sense of self are his and that she is just as empty as she was before synchronizing and cannot possibly fill her sense of self by drawing it from others. Because of this revelation, she is forced to confront the emptiness within her, and her despair causes her to lose control of the synchronization, Serei-den, and herself, releasing the Power of Existence she stored while synchronized with Yuji and requiring Sydonay to save her. Later, during Xanadu's creation, Hecate becomes the sacrifice needed for its creation and reunites with Sydonay in the afterlife.

Sydonay / Senpen Shudonai (「千変」シュドナイ; "Metamorphosis") (Crimson Lord)
Voiced by: Kenta Miyake (Japanese); Eli Gabay (Season 1), Jason Douglas (Seasons 2-3) (English)
A member of the Trinity known as the "General", who remained outside the organization because he sought the freedom to do as he pleased, but assumed his current position after finding the Midnight Lost Child. It is implied that he and Margery fought in the past, as Sydonay describes their current battles as a reunion. He has shape-shifting abilities and, unlike other Denizens, can transform into various chimeras without using spells. He also wields a Treasure Tool called the "Shintetu Nyoi" (神鉄如意; "The Divine Metal at Will"), which resembles a spear. With this weapon in hand, he leads an army of Denizens and Lords, destroying major Outlaws throughout Europe and China. He cares deeply for Hecate and comes to her aid even in the midst of battle, as when he abandons his fight with Margery. He chooses to stay behind when the gate to Xanadu opens, reuniting with Hecate in the afterlife after Margery kills him.
Bel Peol / Gyakuri no Saisha Beru Peoru (「逆理の裁者」ベルペオル; "Arbiter of Reverse Reasoning") (Crimson Lord)
Voiced by: Sayaka Ohara (Japanese); Paula Lindbjerg (Season 1), Caitlin Glass (Seasons 2-3) (English)
A member of the Trinity known as the "Strategist", who is willing to manipulate her subordinates and send them to their deaths, but is also capable in battle. Unlike most Denizens, who live their lives freely, Bel Peol accepts the obstacles that stand in the way of her plans, feeling that overcoming them is what makes life interesting..
Fecor / Rantei Fekorū (「嵐蹄」フェコルー; "Ungula Tarantula") (Crimson Lord)
Voiced by: Yasuhiro Mamiya (Japanese); Cris George (English)
A Lord who usually acts as a guide for Seireiden and greets Denizens and Lords at the gate, but is secretly Bel Peol's right-hand man, being in charge of Seireiden's defense. Despite his appearance and demeanor, he is powerful and can use a Power of Unrestraint called Magnesia, which creates storm of heavy particles that he can manipulate and use for both offense and defense. He later appears in Misaki City as Hecate's bodyguard to protect her from the Flame Hazes. He is killed by Tenmoku Ikko while guarding Bal Masque and the Dimensional Gate.
Sabrac / Kaijin Saburaku (壊刃」サブラク; "Destructive Blade") (Crimson Lord)
Voiced by: Takaya Kuroda (Japanese); Brad Jackson (English)
A Lord who is an assassin working for hire and has won many battles against the Flame Hazes, but only chooses targets he finds interesting. He collects and wields bladed weapons, and his Power of Unrestraint, Stigma, causes the wounds he inflicts to increase in severity over time. Sabrac has a large stature, yet possesses the senses of a human, and hides his body by blending into his surroundings, allowing him to attack undetected. The humanoid form that he can create to attack is nearly invulnerable because it is created from a small part of his body. After Bal Masqué hires him, he puts a part of "Psalm of Grand Order" into the Midnight Lost Child. Bel Peol later hires him and he attacks Misaki City, injuring the Flame Hazes there and putting another part of the "Psalm" into Yuji. However, his arrogance allows Wilhelmina to cure the wounds Stigma inflicted and Yuji deduces his true nature, defeating him by severing the connection between his humanoid part and his true body. Despite this defeat, he escapes using the power of the Gordian Knot. He is ultimately destroyed after falling into the Abyss, having lost the will to fight upon seeing the Snake of the Festival's true form and refusing Bel Peol's aid.
Dantalion / Tantankyūkyū Dantarion (「探耽求究」ダンタリオン; "Seeking Researcher") (Crimson Lord)
Voiced by: Nobuo Tobita (Japanese); Michael Dobson (Season 1), Barry Yandell (Seasons 2-3) (English)
A mad scientist who is willing to conduct research on his fellow Denizens, being responsible for experiments that created some of the powerful Flame Hazes, and will work with anyone in order to achieve his goals. He is also notorious for conducting experiments for the sake of conducting experiments, which annoys others. Bel Peol does not like or trust him and Sydonay hates him, but Hecate is close to him. Near the end of the Second Great War, Sale threw one of Dantalion's own creations, a mass-produced robot primed to explode, under the tower where Xanadu's creation was taking place. Dantalion believed he would be able to escape through an escape route, but was unable to escape because Para had accidentally disabled it. The robot then exploded, killing Dantalion and Domino in the blast.
Vine / Ryūgan Wine (「琉眼」ウィネ; "Glazed Eyes") (Crimson Denizen)
Voiced by: Tatsuhisa Suzuki (Japanese); Peter New (English)
A Jaeger and a subordinate of Bel Peol. He brings the Gordian Knot, which can activate a large-scale destructive Power of Unrestraint, to the Palace of Heaven's Road to stop the exaltation of the new Flame-Haired Blazing-Eyed Hunter.
Orgon / Senseirei Orugon (「千征令」オルゴン; "Commander of Thousand Conquests") (Crimson Lord)
Voiced by: Atsushi Ono (Japanese); Scott McNeil (English)
A Wanderer and a subordinate of Bel Peol. He is sent on a mission to The Palace of Heaven's Road, where he dies after facing his old rival - Rainbow Wings, Merihim/Shiro.
Zarovee / Shūsan no Tei Zarōbi (「聚散の丁」ザロービ; "Collation Flux") (Crimson Denizen)
Voiced by: Yukihiro Misono (Japanese); R Bruce Elliott (English)
A Jaeger with the ability to split into five duplicates, each wearing scarves in red, blue, yellow, green, and pink, but are weaker than a Torch or Flame Haze. He kidnaps Yuji by threatening to consume the citizens of Misaki City in order to lure the Flame Hazes into a trap. However, Yuji ambushes them and destroys one of the duplicates with a fireball and places the hostages under a Seal. The other duplicates are soon killed by Yuji wielding Blutsauger.
Bifrons / Kōgōga Bifuronsu (「吼号呀」ビフロンス; "Howling Fang") (Crimson Denizen)
Voiced by: Hiroki Yasumoto (Japanese); Cole Brown (English)
A Wanderer who usually works with Zarovee and uses a Treasure Tool that grants him stealth in exchange for speed and mobility. He is skilled in fighting from a long distance with projectiles shot from his cannon-like body. When Yuji prevents their scheme, Bifrons fires upon Shana, but dies after being injured in the ensuing explosion and after Sabrac forces him to shoot a cannonball with full power.
