= PollyWorld =

- DVD cover
- Directed by: Bill Moore
- Written by: Elise Allen
- Produced by: Kate Treacy
- Starring: Tegan Moss; Michael Donovan; Kathleen Barr; Nicole Bouma; Tabitha St. Germain; Brittney Wilson; Chiara Zanni
- Music by: Eric Colvin
- Production companies: Curious Pictures; Mattel Entertainment
- Distributed by: Universal Studios Home Entertainment
- Release date: November 14, 2006
- Running time: 70 minutes
- Country: United States
- Language: English

PollyWorld is a 2006 American animated comedy film from Universal Studios, based on the Polly Pocket toy franchise. It is the third Polly Pocket movie (preceded by Lunar Eclipse and 2 Cool at the Pocket Plaza) and the only feature-length film in the series. The movie aired on Nickelodeon in the United States on November 12, 2006, and later Cartoon Network in Latin America. It was released on DVD the following week.

== Synopsis ==
Polly Pocket and her four friends get to be part of their favorite game show, “Roll Like That,” which puts teams of five through several challenges to win money for the charity of their choice.

As the challenges begin, however, Polly learns that her father is engaged to a woman named Lorelai, who secretly wants to get Polly out of the way. Polly and her friends also have to try to get past the scheming Beth, who teams up with Lorelai to get Polly sent to boarding school.

Faced with the prospect of losing everything she loves: her friends, family, and home, Polly decides to make this weekend the best ever.

== Plot ==
Polly Pocket and her friends Shani, Lea, Lila, and Crissy, as well as their entire class, get to be part of their favorite TV show, “Roll Like That,” which is being held at Polly's dad's theme park, Pollyworld. In teams of five, they will compete in challenges to win money for the charity of their choice. Polly's rival Beth is upset because this would've been her big chance to showcase her skills and become the most popular girl in school, and her chances are threatened by Polly being there. Polly gets a call from her father, John, who tells her he has a big surprise for her.

As the challenges begin, Polly learns what the big surprise is: her father is engaged to a woman named Lorelai, who seems to like Polly. Polly isn't sure she's happy about getting a stepmother, and her friends offer to help her by checking Lorelai out for themselves. Later that night, the first competition takes place, and Team Beth wins. Beth overhears Lorelai's phone conversation and learns of her true colors: she's jealous of Polly and thinks she's too much competition, so she's plotting to send her to boarding school. Afterward, Beth blackmails Lorelai to let her help send Polly off to boarding school. That night, John takes Polly and her friends shopping with Lorelai's help. They end the first night watching fireworks.

The next morning, Polly confides in Lila, asking her what she thinks about Lorelai. Lila suggests that Polly buy an engagement present for her father and Lorelai. Polly invites Lorelai to skate and grab burgers with them for lunch. Later that afternoon, during the Rain Forest River Race, Team Pocket develops a plan to fool Team Beth by pretending to be in a fight. Lorelai uses this plan to her advantage, fooling John into thinking Polly is stressed and needs to attend boarding school.

After Team Pocket wins, Polly and Samuel shop for an engagement present. To keep the gift a surprise, Polly tells her dad that she is hanging out with friends. John catches her in the lie but goes along and asks Lorelai for advice. While shopping, Samuel tells Polly to give Lorelai a chance. While Polly is away, Lorelai tricks Samuel into feeling guilty for stepping into a parental mother-figure role for Polly. Samuel informs Polly he will be taking a leave of absence.

An upset Polly goes to her father, who breaks the news that Polly will be attending boarding school starting Monday. Polly's friends cheer her up and decide to make this the best weekend ever. Crissy's fear of rollercoasters during the third challenge prevents her from riding the tallest rollercoaster, the Polly Whirl. Supporting Crissy, Team Pocket decides to go elsewhere, but Crissy can't stand losing to Team Beth. During Team Beth and Team Pocket's rollercoaster face-off, Beth reveals that she knew about boarding school, and Tori reveals that Beth heard it from Lorelai, making Polly suspicious. Rick and Todd's team ends up winning the third challenge in their place. As Lila, Lea, Shani, and Crissy talk about the live finale, Polly realizes that boarding school isn't her father's idea and that Lorelai made him think it was.

Later that night, Shani finds a recorded conversation on her camera of Beth asking Lorelai whether Polly is going to boarding school. They decide to show this to John to prove that it was Lorelai's plan. In the end, Polly decides not to show her dad the DVD because she cares more about his happiness.

The next day, Beth traps Team Pocket underneath a stage before the final competition. The show begins with no sign of Team Pocket. At the last minute, Crissy finds a lever, which frees Team Pocket, who appears onstage and performs "Rock This Town." Frustrated about potentially losing, Beth drags Lorelai into a room to discuss their plan. Beth accidentally sits on a button that turns on the microphone and broadcasts their entire conversation to the audience. John finds out about Lorelai's plan, confronts Lorelai for lying to him, and cancels the engagement. As Lorelai runs after him, Beth takes advantage of being on the big screen to show off her cheerleading skills, only to trip and get tangled in wires, causing the audience to laugh at her, and her team is disqualified. Rick and Todd's team, Team Thrash, wins the Roll Like That competition. Afterward, Polly comforts her dad, who apologizes for what he did and tells her she doesn't have to go to boarding school anymore. Together, Team Pocket celebrates its best weekend ever by watching fireworks.

== Music ==
- "Welcome to My World", performed by Michèle Vice-Maslin
- "Smile", performed by Simply Red
- "Perfect Kinda Day", performed by Sara Niemietz
- "Another Word for Change", performed by Cassidy Ladden
- "Every Day's a Holiday", performed by Robyn Newman
- "Rock n' Roll Girl", performed by Jordan McCoy
- "Rock This Town", performed by Cassidy Ladden
- "Rock U Now", performed by Cassidy Ladden

== Cast ==
- Tegan Moss as Polly Pocket
- Chiara Zanni as Shani, Polly's friend
- Nicole Bouma as Crissy, Polly's friend
- Natalie Walters as Lea, a redheaded athlete and Polly's friend; Caroline Hall, a popstar
- Brittney Wilson as Lila, a fashion-forward friend of Polly
- Tabitha St. Germain as Beth, the mean girl; Karl and Lark, Swedish brother and sister in a student exchange program who only speak Swedish; Dani
- Jocelyne Loewen as Evie, one of Beth's friends; Stacey
- Nicole Oliver as Tori, one of Beth's friends; Amanda
- Russell Roberts as Samuel, Polly's butler and driver
- Kathleen Barr as Lorelai, Polly's father's child-hating fiancée; elevator voice; Lexi;“Roll Like That” producer
- Michael Donovan as John Pocket, Polly's dad; “Roll Like That” director
- Alessandro Juliani as Donovan, host of “Roll Like That”
- Teryl Rothery as Ms. Marklin; Lizzie
- Andrew Francis as Rick, a boy who seems to have a crush on Polly
- Matt Hill as Todd, Rick's best friend; DJ
- Danny McKinnon as Nathan; waiter
- Terry Klassen as tech guy for “Roll Like That”

== Reception ==
The film deserves major kudos for incorporating a topic such as remarriage into the plot, but based on the questionable actions of Polly's stepmother, who isn't as nice as she pretends to be, parents in a new or impending marriage may want to view those parts first in order to evaluate whether this film might trigger some painful emotions in their own kids.

— Lacey Worrell, Pollyworld, DVD Talk
