= D'Myna Leagues =

- Created by: Chris Bartleman; Blair Peters
- Directed by: Billy Zeats (S1); Eduardo Soriano (S2)
- Voices of: Matt Hill; Tabitha St. Germain; Jim Byrnes; Teryl Rothery; Michael Dobson; Scott McNeil; Phil Hayes
- Composer: Michael Richard Plowman
- Country of origin: Canada
- Original language: English
- No. of seasons: 2
- No. of episodes: 26

Production
- Executive producers: Blair Peters; Chris Bartleman
- Producers: Blair Peters (S1); Chris Bartleman (S1); Alia Nakashima (S2)
- Production companies: Aston Entertainment Group; Studio B Productions; MSH Entertainment

Original release
- Network: YTV; CTV
- Release: November 6, 2000 – June 28, 2004

D'Myna Leagues is a Canadian animated television series, which aired on CTV from 2000 to 2004. Loosely based on the baseball writing of W. P. Kinsella, the series was set in a world populated by anthropomorphic birds, and centred on the minor league baseball team in the town of Mynaville. The baseball games were represented by placing two-dimensional characters in three-dimensional backgrounds. The teams of bird characters were opposed by rival teams like the Weasels, the Pigs, the Beavers and the Elephants.

The series was created by the Vancouver-based Studio B Productions.

In the United States, the series aired on The WB 100+ Station Group. The show is distributed internationally by Sony Pictures Television.

== Characters ==
=== Mynaville Mynas ===
Ebbet Myna (Matt Hill): Shortstop

Nikki Tinker (Tabitha St. Germain): Second base

Rip Hickory (Jim Byrnes): Catcher and Manager

Lucinda "Lefty" Lane (Teryl Rothery): Relief Pitcher

Reggie Stainback (Phil Hayes): Third base

Flamingo Kid (Michael Dobson): Pitcher

Big Tree Powell (Scott McNeil): First base

Jackie Mungo (Scott McNeil): Utility player

Jeff Mungo (Phil Hayes): Utility player

Steve Mungo (Terry Klassen): Utility player

Mud Flap Flammen (Phil Hayes): Outfielder

Sammy Spinoza: Outfielder

=== Antagonists ===
Commissioner Ratso Radcliffe (Gerard Plunkett)

Paully (Ian James Corlett)

Schlitzy (Michael Dobson)

=== Commentators ===
Barry (David Kaye)

Bart (Ian James Corlett)

Harry (Brent Chapman)

=== Others ===
Abe the Ump (Terry Klassen):

Divinity Plunkett (Kathleen Barr): Owner of the Mynas

Rod Blackbird (Rod Black): A documentary filmmaker who appears in the episode "A Starling Is Born".

== Episodes ==
=== Season 1 ===
No.	Title	Written by	Original release date
1	"Golden Boy"	Ian Weir	November 6, 2000
2	"On the Road"	Susin Nielsen	TBA
3	"Psych Out"	Graeme Manson	TBA
4	"Birth O' Da Birds"	Ian Weir	TBA
5	"Joke's on You"	Susin Nielsen	TBA
6	"Mungomania"	John May and Suzanne Bolch	TBA
7	"Baseball... Bah, Humbug"	Dennis Foon	TBA
8	"Sticks and Stones"	Graeme Manson	TBA
9	"Mommy Dearest"	Dennis Foon	TBA
10	"A Tree Grows in Mynaville"	Alan Levin	TBA
11	"Don't It Make My Blue Eyes Green"	Susin Nielsen	TBA
12	"Somethin' Stinks"	John May and Suzanne Bolch	TBA
13	"Who Do Voodoo"	Graeme Manson	TBA

=== Season 2 ===
No.	Title	Written by	Original release date
14	"The Tribe Has Spoken"	Susin Nielsen	TBA
15	"The Aluminum Chef"	Alia Nakashima	TBA
16	"Showdown"	Alan Levin	TBA
17	"And Then There Were Two"	Susin Nielsen	TBA
18	"Pure Poetry"	Ian Weir	TBA
19	"Skin Deep"	Susin Nielsen	TBA
20	"A Peaceful Queasy Feeling"	Alan Levin	TBA
21	"Come Barnstorm with Me"	Alan Levin	TBA
22	"B.R.A.D. 9000"	Victor Nicolle	TBA
23	"Oh Brother"	Cathy Moss	TBA
24	"Video Killed the Baseball Star"	Leslie Mildiner	TBA
25	"Scavenger Avengers"	Alan Levin	TBA
26	"A Starling is Born"	Alan Levin	June 28, 2004
