= Polly Pocket: Lunar Eclipse =

- Paramount+ art for the movie
- Directed by: Mike Milo
- Written by: Erin Ehrlich
- Produced by: Nancy Bennett
- Starring: Tegan Moss; Kathleen Barr; Nicole Bouma; Tabitha St. Germain; Brittney Wilson; Chiara Zanni
- Music by: Jared Faber
- Production companies: Mike Young Productions; Mattel Entertainment
- Distributed by: Universal Studios Home Video
- Release date: 2004
- Running time: 22 minutes
- Country: United States
- Language: English

Polly Pocket: Lunar Eclipse (originally known as Polly Pocket's The First Movie or Polly Pocket) is a 2004 American animated adventure short film based on the Polly Pocket line of dolls as the first animated film based on the franchise. It is the first of three developed by Universal Studios (succeeded by films Polly Pocket: 2 Cool at the Pocket Plaza and PollyWorld). The film has some scene cameos of My Scene: Jammin' In Jamaica.

The film received mixed-to-negative reviews. Despite this, the film became popular in Latin America due to the high sales of the Polly Pocket line at the time in the region.

In the United States, the film was released as a free box prize whenever the selected person bought any select Polly Pocket playset or Kellogg's cereal, and as a bonus with the "Divine Dogs" playset of the "Dazzling Pet Show" line.

== Plot ==
The film stars the title character and popular doll of the same name, Polly Pocket. Her friends Lila, Ana, Shani, Todd, Rick, and Lea also star.

A few days before their school dance, Polly and the other girls are given the assignment to learn about lunar eclipses, which will count for one-third of their grades. Unfortunately, Lila fears she will be grounded and unable to play with the rest of the girls in their band, Polly and the Pockets if she does not get a good grade. Polly and her friends organize a trip to her family's South Pacific island where a lunar eclipse will be visible that night. Meanwhile, Beth, a classmate who is jealous of Polly because she's the most popular student in school, tampers with Lila's camera so she will not be able to take photos of the eclipse, and cause her to fail her assignment.

Polly and her friends arrive at the island and spend all day at the special water park. As it gets dark, the friends start to observe the eclipse. They stop to help a dolphin calf, stuck near the beach, return to the sea. When they arrive home, Lila discovers that the photos she took of the eclipse were spoiled by Beth's prank, as they contain double-exposures. Luckily, Polly comes up with a plan to save the project with Ana's help. The girls are given an A+, and Polly and her band manage to perform at the school dance, and the film ends.

Official Description From Paramount+ "Join Polly and her friends as they travel to her father's island in the Pacific to research lunar eclipses. But the pressure is on! If they don't get a good grade for the project, Lila will be grounded and Polly's band, "Polly and the Pockets" won't be able to play at the school dance! Will they ace the project and get to play? Or will frenemies get in the way... "

== Cast ==
- Tegan Moss as Polly
- Brittney Wilson as Lila
- Nicole Bouma as Ana
- Chiara Zanni as Shani
- Natalie Walters as Lea
- Russell Roberts as Samuel
- Tabitha St. Germain as Beth
- Nicole Oliver as Evie
- Jocelyne Loewen as Tori
- Teryl Rothery as Ms. Marklin
- Matt Hill as Todd
- Andrew Francis as Rick
