= Tegan Moss =

Canadian actress (born 1985)

- Born: February 7, 1985 (age 41); Vancouver, British Columbia, Canada
- Education: Point Grey Secondary School
- Occupation: Actress
- Years active: 1993–present
- Spouse: Joshua Franken (m. 2013)
- Children: 2
- Relatives: Jesse Moss (brother)

Tegan Moss (born February 7, 1985) is a Canadian actress appearing in film and television. She was nominated for the Young Artist Awards in 1997 and 2000.

== Early life and education ==
Moss was born in Vancouver, British Columbia. She has two brothers, Rory Moss and actor Jesse Moss. Her given name is of Welsh origin, meaning "fair one" and pronounced to rhyme with "Megan". Moss attended the Point Grey Secondary School and graduated in June 2003.

== Personal life ==
Moss married her husband, Joshua Franken, in 2013. Together, they have two children.

== Filmography ==
=== Film ===
Year	Title	Role	Notes
1993	Look Who's Talking Now	Girl with Puppy	
1994	Trust in Me	Kimberley Gray	
1994	Little Women	Minnie Kirk	
1996	Big Bully	Girl in Class	
1996	The Angel of Pennsylvania Avenue	Bernice Feagan	
1999	Sea People	Amanda Forrest	
2000	The Guilty	Faith	
2007	White Noise: The Light	Liz	
2007	Scar	Susie	
2008	The Eye	Teenage Girl	
2008	Christmas Cottage	Nanette	
2008	Free Style	Crystal	
2009	Wild Cherry	Hannah	
2009	Dr. Dolittle: Million Dollar Mutts	Tiffany Monaco	Video
2010	Charlie St. Cloud	Cindy	
2010	November Christmas	Vanessa Marks (adult)	
2011	Lloyd the Conqueror	Cassandra	
2013	Vikingdom	Freyja	
2017	My Little Pony: The Movie	Canterlot Featured Voices	
2025	The Boy Who Vanished	Haley Reese	Cast along with her brother Jesse

=== Television ===
Year	Title	Role	Notes
1994	Tears and Laughter: The Joan and Melissa Rivers Story	Marcie Werner	TV movie
1994	Someone Else's Child	Andrea	TV movie
1994	The X-Files	Young Dana Scully	Episode: "One Breath"
1994	Hurricanes	Additional Voices	TV series
1995	The Omen	Little Girl	TV movie
1995	Are You Afraid of the Dark?	Lisa	Episode: "The Tale of C7"
1996	The X-Files	Young Dana Scully	Episode: "Piper Maru"
1997	The Rainbow Fish	Fish with Viridian Fins (voice)	Video
1997	Super Dave's All Stars	Female Page	Episode: "1.102"
1998	RoboCop: Alpha Commando	Additional Voices	Episode: "Garden of Evil"
1998	The Color of Courage	Maggie Sipes	TV movie
1998	Snowden: Raggedy Ann & Andy's Adventure	Marcella (voice)	Video
1998–2001	You, Me and the Kids	Lisa / Kate (voice)	20 episodes
1999	Sabrina: The Animated Series	(voice)	4 episodes
1999	War Planets	Lady Zera (voice)	2 episodes
1999	Sea People	Amanda Forrest	TV movie
2000	Casper's Haunted Christmas	Holly Jollimore (voice)	Video
2000–2001	So Weird	Rhonda	4 episodes
2001	The Cramp Twins	Girl #1 (voice)	Episode: "Food Fight / Mari Mania"
2002	Video Voyeur: The Susan Wilson Story	Emily Wilson	TV movie
2002	Inspector Gadget's Last Case: Claw's Revenge	Penny (voice)	TV movie
2002–2003	Gadget & the Gadgetinis	Penny (voice)	52 episodes
2003	Twelve Mile Road	Roxanne	TV movie
2003	Dead Like Me	Fiona	Episode: "Reaper Madness"
2004	Dead Like Me	Fiona	Episode: "Forget Me Not"
2004	Polly Pocket: Lunar Eclipse	Polly (voice)	Video
2004	My Scene: Jammin' in Jamaica	Nolee (voice)	TV short
2004	My Scene: Masquerade Madness	Nolee (voice)	TV short
2005	My Scene Goes Hollywood: The Movie	Nolee (voice)	Video
2005	Inspector Gadget's Biggest Caper Ever	Penny (voice)	Video
2005	A Fairy Tale Christmas	Gruzinda / Young Girl (voice)	TV movie
2005	Murder Unveiled	Veronica	TV movie
2005	2 Cool at the Pocket Plaza	Polly (voice)	Video short
2006	Merlin's Apprentice	Yvonne	TV miniseries
2006	Eight Days To Live	Becca Spring	TV movie
2006	Godiva's	Dani	3 episodes
2006	A Girl Like Me: The Gwen Araujo Story	Lisa	TV movie
2006	Alice, I Think	Karen Field	5 episodes
2006	PollyWorld	Polly (voice)	Video
2007	Seventeen and Missing	Lori Janzen	TV movie
2007	The Bad Son	Christy McAdams	TV movie
2007–2008	Robson Arms	Georgia 'Georgie' Goldstein	6 episodes
2008	7 Things to Do Before I'm 30	Meredith Vargas	TV movie
2008	The Unquiet	Tess	TV movie
2008	NYC: Tornado Terror	Lori Lawrence	TV movie
2009	Fringe	Rebecca Kibner (video footage)	Episode: "A New Day in the Old Town"; Episode: "Momentum Deferred"
2010	Degrassi: The Next Generation	Contestant Hayley	Episode: "Don't Let Me Get Me: Part 1"; Episode: "Don't Let Me Get Me: Part 2"
2010	November Christmas	Adult Vanessa	Hallmark Hall of Fame TV movie
2011	Flashpoint	Leslie MacCoy	Episode: "No Promises"
2017	Summer In the Vineyard	Lexi	Hallmark Channel TV Movie
2017	The Good Doctor	Elisabeth McLaren	Episode: "Intangibles"
2018	My Little Pony: Equestria Girls – Rollercoaster of Friendship	Vignette Valencia (voice)	One-hour TV special
2019	Valentine In the Vineyard	Lexi	Hallmark Channel TV Movie
2019	Mystery 101: Dead Talk	Rachael Knox	Hallmark M&M TV Movie
2020	The Aurora Teagarden Mysteries: Reunited & It Feels So Deadly	Amy	Hallmark M&M TV Movie
2021	A Christmas Miracle for Daisy	Andi	GAC Family's Great American Christmas
2024	Sight Unseen	Rae	Recurring

== Awards and nominations ==
Awards
Year	Award	Category	Production	Result
1997	Young Artist Award	Best Performance in a TV Movie/Miniseries – Young Actress	The Angel of Pennsylvania Avenue	Nominated
2000	Young Artist Award	Best Performance in a TV Movie or Pilot – Leading Young Actress	Sea People	Nominated
2007	Gemini	Best Performance by an Actress in a Featured Supporting Role in a Dramatic Program or Miniseries	Eight Days to Live	Nominated
