= Zoids: Fuzors =

Japanese anime television series

ゾイド フューザーズ (Zoido Fyūzāzu)
- Genre: Adventure, mecha
- Anime television series
- Directed by: Kouji Makita (eps. 1–16); Yorifusa Yamaguchi (chief)
- Produced by: Fukashi Azuma; Toshihiro Nakazawa
- Written by: Hideki Shirane
- Music by: Tetsuya Komuro
- Studio: Tokyo Kids
- Licensed by: Hasbro; Viz Media
- Original network: TXN (TV Tokyo)
- English network: AU: Cartoon Network; US: Cartoon Network
- Original run: October 4, 2003 – December 27, 2003
- Episodes: 26
- Other series
- List of all Zoids series

Zoids: Fuzors (ゾイド フューザーズ, Zoido Fyūzāzu) is an anime series, linked to the Zoids toy line of the same name. It is the third Zoids series, following Zoids: New Century Zero in order of production. The series is 26 episodes long, however, the show had an unsuccessful U.S. broadcast, and only aired its first 13 episodes. Similar to Transformers: Armada, the show was first broadcast in the U.S. instead of Japan. Zoids: Fuzors was created specifically for the western market and was not originally intended to air in Japan at all, though it was eventually broadcast there in 2004. For the Japanese broadcast and its subsequent DVD release, the animation was given some additional polish and the second episode was remade from scratch.

== Series background ==
The series focuses on a delivery boy named RD who works for a company called Mach Storm, based in Blue City, a metropolis on Planet Zi's Eastern Continent. Mach Storm also moonlights as a Zoids battling team. RD learns the ropes of becoming a good Zoid pilot, and eventually discovers the abilities to fuse with other Zoids. Like Zoids: New Century, Zoids battles are also fought for competition, however, instead of the Judge Satellites and wide open areas used for fighting, the sanctioned battles take place in enclosed arenas. Due to setbacks in the toy production line, the lead Zoid is the Liger Zero. The Energy Liger (known early in development as the "Air Liger") was intended to be featured as the main character's Zoid, but the toy wouldn't be ready in time for the show's debut.

The series initially focuses on the rivalry between the Mach Storm and Savage Hammer teams, as well as other battles. As the series progresses, RD and the rest of Mach Storm become aware of a conspiracy to take control of Blue City, and fight to stop it.

Fuzors differs from previous seasons because it shows a lot more of the setting outside the Zoid battles or military. In Fuzors, two, sometimes more, Zoids can combine to become a single unit called a Fuzor. However, not every Zoid can be a Fuzor and for multiple units existing only one is a Fuzor partner to another. For example, Savage Hammer had multiple Leoblazes, but only Matt's Leoblaze (which was owned by Mach Storm) was compatible as part of the Matrix Dragon.

A Zi-Fighter's license is a glove for the right hand (that leaves only the middle, ring and small fingers bare) with a mechanical device on the back. This apparently is used for "synchronization" and to bring out the full potential of the Zoid being piloted. Also, it is used to initiate a Fuzor combination. Furthermore, it can work as something of a short-range communicator when outside the cockpit.

The command to initiate the fusion is "FUZORS, COMBINE!" for the American version and "ZI-UNIZON!" for the Japanese version while raising a clenched right fist to face level, followed by the name of the Fuzor (ex: RD here raises his gauntlet and shouts "FUZORS, COMBINE/ZI-UNIZON! Liger Zero Phoenix!")

Zoids: Fuzors has no connection to the previous Zoids anime produced by Xebec and Digital Frontier. Though this went unmentioned in the show itself, information on the packaging associated with the series' Japanese toy release clarifies that Zoids: Fuzors takes place in the same fictional universe as the Zoids Battle Story, in the same location and during the same time frame as volumes 9-12 of Zoids Official Fan Book EX.

== Characters ==
=== The Mach Storm Team ===
- RD

Voiced by: Kenji Nojima (Japanese); Brad Swaile (English)

The main protagonist of the series. RD is a delivery boy who works for the company known as Mach Storm. He becomes the pilot of the Liger Zero. However, he still has yet to grow as a Zoid pilot. RD is determined to become better, and usually butts heads with his rival Blake, who pilots the Berserk Fury. After a close call while fighting Blake and his Buster Fury Zoid, he is saved by the Fire Phoenix and eventually discovers the ability to Fuse it with the Liger Zero to create the powerful Liger Zero Phoenix. RD's personal goal is to find the legendary "Alpha Zoid", a Zoid that is more powerful than any other. It is the same Zoid that his father dedicated his life to finding. Even though his father, Harris, left him when he was very young, RD is determined to follow in his footsteps. RD matures considerably over the course of the series, turning from a brash and somewhat irresponsible young man into a skilled pilot and leader, although he still maintains a somewhat immature attitude.

- Sweet

Voiced by: Chie Nakamura (Japanese); Nicole Bouma (English)

Sweet is another member of Mach Storm. Even though she does not pilot a Zoid, she is usually seen driving a Gustav Traveller. She seems to have a very close and somewhat motherly relationship with RD, and is usually there for him when he needs help. It is quite obvious that they have feelings for each other, even though they have yet to come out. In many ways, she acts like an older sister to RD. Sweet seems to see Amy as a rival for RD's affections, even though the rivalry exists only in her head. She also gets very annoyed whenever RD is around Rebecca. Sweet does a lot of the day to day work in running the team, doing financial work as well as cooking and running the base. She also moonlights in other jobs, working as a waitress amongst other things.

- Helmut

Voiced by: Jouji Nakata (Japanese); Brian Dobson (English)

The oldest pilot in the Mach Storm Team (being in his mid 30s), Helmut Titan (known as Maskman in the Japanese version) was a member of the "original" Mach Storm along with Harris, Marvis, Haldo and Graheme (Sandra commented at the end of series that Helmut was just like RD when he was younger, but he denies by exactly like him). Helmut taught RD how to pilot a Zoid, and to this day can still beat him. He has a rather fatherly relationship with RD, and is his mentor to a degree. Helmut pilots a Command Wolf AC, and has done such for his entire career. His Zoid has been slightly modified, and sports a Laser Claw upgrade amongst other systems. Also, after fusing with Sigma's Leostriker for the first time against the escaped Marvis, the Command Wolf AC had become pearl white instead of the standard sapphire blue color scheme. Helmut always wears a mask, but it is never revealed why.

- Sigma

Voiced by: Anri Katsu (Japanese); Ted Cole (English)

The third member of Mach Storm, Sigma is older than RD, is rather cocky and argumentative, and tends to look down on RD. Despite this, he is a capable pilot. He usually provides fire support for the team with his Boldguard, whose cannons have been modified to fire various weapons (including the 'capture rings' used to immobilizes wild Zoids). After the Boldguard was destroyed, it was replaced with a new Leostriker. Later in the series, Sigma and Helmut's Zoids gain the ability to fuse into the Command Striker. For some reason, the Command Striker was never utilized in the final battle against Alpha. One has to wonder if the Command Striker could have held out longer against the Berserk Seismo's Sword Rail Cannon than the two Zoids separately.

- Amy

Voiced by: Manabi Mizuno (Japanese); Chiara Zanni (English)

A freelance agent within the Team, Amy seems to only work as a part of Mach Storm when it suits her. Amy uses her looks to get her way, and seems to enjoy setting up Mach Storm to further her own aims. She's a good person per se, just rather greedy and selfish. Despite this, she does help out the team in battle, even when it seems like there's nothing in it for her. Amy pilots a König Wolf Mk II that she inherited from her earlier days being part of a two-person fighting team with Keith. Keith abandoned the König Wolf and lost his self-confidence when he was defeated in a championship, and Amy got to keep it.

- Matt

Voiced by: Ayumi Tsunematsu (Japanese); Danny McKinnon (English)

A young boy (about ten) who was living alone in the city when RD found him. Matt's mother had died, and his father had moved away to work. Matt was taken in by RD and become an unofficial member of the team. Impressed by RD, he decided to become a Zoid pilot and learned to pilot the team's Leoblaze. The rest of Mach Storm, however, was not impressed. This plan backfired, as the Leoblaze was stolen by Savage Hammer and used to form their Matrix Dragon. However, after the mini-arc, Matt appears not to have been traumatized, even when he himself references the Fuzor a few episodes later (the focus of the episode in question, coincidentally, is the Matrix Dragon's counterpart, the Chimera Dragon, thus the reference). Matt is quick to tag along with RD when he is on a mission.

- Dan

Voiced by: Koichi Tochika (Japanese); Michael Dobson (English)

Dan is the main mechanic for Mach Storm. Always reliable and eager to help out the Mach Storm team, he becomes really excited once he learns that Zoids have the ability to fuse. He tries to go out of his way to discover ways to fuse each of Mach Storm's Zoids. Dan first joined Mach Storm when he was stranded in the middle of a desert after his truck ran out of gas (In the Japanese version Dan showed up at Mach Storm offering his help when he heard that Liger Zero was going to battle Killer Spiner). He runs into RD and Sweet, and begs them to join the team, mostly because RD pilots a Liger Zero, which is Dan's favourite Zoid ("a classic" as he describes it). He can pilot a Zoid himself, and uses a Heldigunner later in the show, though not for battles.

- Hop

Voiced by: Tetsuo Sakaguchi (Japanese); Russell Roberts (English)

The manager of the Mach Storm team, Hop seems to be perpetually worried about the team's finances. Not a fighter by any means, he is completely unprepared for any sort of combat. He tends to worry about the team's situation, their reputation, and how much money they're going to spend on repairing their Zoids. When confronted with danger he suggested going to see his sister in another city for a while. Despite all this, he is still very reliable and gets along well with the rest of the team.

=== The Savage Hammer Team ===
- Blake

Voiced by: Junji Majima (Japanese); Brian Drummond (English)

Blake (Blade in the Japanese version) is the main antagonist of Fuzors, but he becomes much less of an antagonist after episode 16. He has an intense rivalry/hatred for RD for initially unknown reasons. The lead pilot of Savage Hammer, he uses a Berserk Führer that has the (unique) ability to fuse with a Buster Eagle, forming the Buster Fury/Buster Fuhrer. Blake seems to be driven entirely by his hatred of RD, but despite this, he has a close friendship with his co-pilot, Luke. He also strongly believes in the bond between a Zoid and its pilot, stating that a Zoid will never willingly betray its pilot. Blake's Zoid is destroyed by the Energy Liger. It is later replaced with a Gairyuki (sometimes erroneously called Gairyuki Fury). His hatred of RD is later revealed by flashback to stem from his first ever battle, where his Geno Saurer (mistakenly dubbed "the Gairyuki") was easily defeated by RD's Liger Zero. Blake lears that Sandra sabotaged his Zoid and blamed RD for it in order to recruit him to Savage Hammer. He seemed to become less spiteful of RD after that, although he still taunts him every now and then but not for hateful reasons. Blake's Gairyuki is capable of becoming either a Gairyuki Speed (fused with an Evo Flyer) or a Gairyuki Destroy (fuzed with a Dispelow), the former was used against his and RD's last battle against the Energy Liger (no Fuzor sequence was shown and the Fuzor itself only appeared for less than 2 minutes, after which the Gairyuki was hit, splitting the two and heavily damaging the Evo Flyer) and the later being the first used and later used again for a short time in the final battle (minus the Fuzor sequence). Ironically, he never used either of his Fuzor zoids against RD (by the time he got them he was more concerned with finding the captured Luke). It is not known what happened to Blake and Luke following their reunion after the battle, considering Sandra having dissolving the Savage Hammer Team, but it is possible the two formed a rival team, this time lacking the intent of revenge.

- Sandra

Voiced by: Atsuko Yuya (Japanese); Tabitha St. Germain (English)

The manager of Savage Hammer, Sandra is a rich businesswoman and very influential within Blue City. She formed the team and supplies them with their Zoids, as well as fuels their ongoing feud with Mach Storm. She seems to enjoy setting up the two teams against each other. Sandra is very well connected, with contacts amongst the city's criminal elements. She is usually seen cradling a small and fat white cat. Sandra's father, Graheme, was a member of the original Mach Storm. However, after he was apparently killed by Helmut, she formed Savage Hammer to get her revenge. In the end, however, Burton revealed that it was Marvis who killed him and framed Helmut for it. Following that revelation, she briefly becomes wracked with intense guilt, but is quickly dispelled as (it appears) Mach Storm held no grudge against her, probably because Helmut explained to the rest of them the reason for her misguidance. The epilogue reveals her now part of Mach Storm, assisting with business matters.

- Burton

Voiced by: Ryuuzou Ishino (Japanese); Alessandro Juliani (English)

Another member of Savage Hammer, Burton usually acts as Blake's second. Snidely and superior, he tends to look down on everyone around him. At the same time, he spends a lot of time toadying to Sandra. Burton is something of a coward, and is usually the first to run when things look bad. He pilots a Lord Gale. It is later revealed that he is yet another of Alpha's lackeys. In a failed attempt to subdue the resisting Zi-Fighters, RD defeated him after Blake backed RD up by defeating Rebecca.

- Luke

Voiced by: Hiroki Shimowada (Japanese); Michael Coleman (English)

A supporting member of the team, Luke is not normally a combat pilot, being more of a technical expert and analyst. He served as a backup to Blake, piloting the team's Buster Eagle when it fused with the Berserk Fury. Luke also developed the Gairyuki, possibly from the wreckage of Blake's Berserk Fury. The Gairyuki's development is likely a result of Luke's blaming himself for the Fury's destruction. He was later brainwashed by Alpha, and joined his forces. When working for Alpha he piloted a Leogator, and was a part of the Seimosaurus crew. During the final battle Blake freed him from the Seismosaurus (in the process destroying the Styluarmor fused with it). After the battle Luke felt sorry for everything he did, but Blake did not have any ill feelings towards him.

- Watts, Miguel, and Vulcan

Watts Voiced by: Hidetoshi Nakamura (Japanese); Ward Perry (English)
Miguel Voiced by: Daisuke Kirii (Japanese); Terry Klassen (English)
Vulcan Voiced by: Tomomichi Nishimura (Japanese); Doug Parker (English)

Halfway through the series, the Savage Hammer team employ three mercenaries named Miguel, Vulcan, and their leader Watts to undermine the Mach Storm team. At their disposal were a Nightwise, Mosasledge and Unelagia, respectively. After obtaining information from Dr. Pierce concerning quad-combining Zoids, the three formulated a plan to find a Leoblaze to create such a Fuzor. Despite the Savage Hammer supply of Leoblazes, only one Leoblaze was compatible: the one belonging to Matt of Mach Storm. Tricking Matt into giving them his Leoblaze's data under the pretense of using to help him in Zoid battles, the men attacked RD and Matt while the two were in battle. The Leoblaze was forced in to a fusion with the Unelagia, Mosasledge and Nightwise, forming the Matrix Dragon. After ejecting Matt, the Liger Zero Phoenix was easily beaten. A week later, after numerous failed attempts to recover the Leoblaze (Sandra had forged registration paper claiming the stolen Zoid was theirs to begin with), RD challenged Savage Hammer in a battle for it. Midway into the battle, the three turned on both teams, leaving the Buster Fuhrer and Liger Zero Phoenix fighting it. Despite the "combined" (Blake was also after RD) forces plus the plan of Mach Storm, the Matrix Dragon emerged victorious. Immediately after, the Energy Liger revealed itself and destroyed the Buster Fuhrer and Matrix Dragon. Vulcan, Miguel and Watts were subsequently fired from Savage Hammer.

=== Richter Scale ===
- Alpha Richter

Voiced by: Tomokazu Seki (Japanese); Michael Dobson (English)

A wealthy businessman and member of the Blue City Council, Alpha is one of the most powerful and influential men in the city. He also is secretly plotting to take control of the city and use that as a stepping stone to greater things. To this end, he has been manipulating events to steer him into control of the city. Alpha develops the Seismosaurus as his ultimate weapon which will allow him to crush any resistance to his rule. Sandra is his adopted younger sister, and he helped her start Savage Hammer, as well as supplying them with their Zoids. Luke, Rebecca and Burton, as well as Marvis and Dr Pierce are also working for him. For a time, Vareth, Dart and Saber (pilots of the Gravity Wolf, Saix and Saurer, respectively; see below), in their debut appearance were employed to eliminate Blake and RD in a match (in reality, Alpha would gather data on the Gairyuki and Liger Zero Falcon while the battle raged on for use in developing the Seismosaurus) but ran away on the impression that their method of escape was a secret weapon for such an occasion. They left Alpha's service immediately after and became Mach Storm's allies. All of Alpha's loyal and most prominent subordinates (minus Sandra after she realized what he was doing and her being another tool of his and Dr. Pierce who rebelled after his Energy Liger was discarded) are as follows: Rebecca, Luke (brainwashed), Burton, Marvis, and Reynard. He, Marvis, and the rest of the Seismosaurus crew survive the Zoid's destruction but are immediately captured (except for Luke who Blake rescues and retrieves) by Gummie and the PKB upon crawling out of the wreckage. Alpha's name is apparently a pun; the Richter Scale measures the strength of earthquakes, while the Seismosaurus' name means "Earthquake lizard". In fact, Richter Scale is the name of his organization.

- Rebecca

Voiced by: Kae Araki

Alpha's assistant, Rebecca is also a Zoid pilot and a spy for his organization. She infiltrates the Mach Storm team posing as a Zoid pilot, and provides information on their activities. She is also very loyal to Alpha, willing to stand between him and the rampaging Gojulas Giga. Rebecca piloted a Dimetroptera. She originally has long purple hair, but wears a short red-and-orange wig and translucent blue shades during her spying on Mach Storm. Her voice constantly changes throughout her appearances in the American version. Sometimes she has a deep voice, while at other times she would have a sweeter voice.

=== The Peace Keeping Bureau (PKB) ===
- Gummie

In charge of the PKB, Gummie's character in the American version has a stereotypical 'cowboy' accent, and acts in a very gung-ho and brash manner similar to a sheriff from the American Mid-West. Gummie pilots a Gojulas Giga.

- Ciao

Voiced by: Ayumi Tsunematsu (Japanese); Tabitha St. Germain (English)

Ciao is a junior officer in the PKB as part of a trio with Gummie and Deed.

- Deed

Voiced by: Makoto Yasumura (Japanese); Scott McNeil (English)

Deed is more experienced than Ciao and tends to take a very sarcastic attitude to others, either to wind them up or just for fun.

=== Other characters ===
- Doug

Voiced by: Daisuke Kishio

A kid who lived in a small town outside of Blue City, Doug hired Mach Storm for help to protect his community against rampaging wild Zoids. However, amongst the wild Unenlagia was a pair of Zoids that the team had not expected, a Dispelow and Evo Flyer that destroyed Doug's Helcat. These same two Zoids later became Blake's Fuzor partners for his Gairyuki (see Blake's entry above). Doug later replaced the Helcat, and joined Mach Storm in fighting Alpha.

- Dr. Pierce

Voiced by: Takeshi Aono (Japanese); Brian Dobson (English)

A scientist who works in Blue City, Dr. Wolfgang Pierce is the leading expert in Zoid technology and Fuzors. He provides assistance to the Mach Storm team on several occasions. Dr Pierce is secretly working for Alpha, developing new Zoids for him. He created the Energy Liger and Gorilla Tron (Ray Kong in the Japanese version) as the "ultimate Zoids". However, Alpha discarded them in favor of the Seismosaurus. Embittered, Pierce used the Zoids to undermine Alpha's plans. Eventually he used them against RD and nearly beat him, but Blake interfered with battle allowing RD to win. Pierce survived but was depressed that his Energy Ray Liger could lose.

- Haldo

Voiced by: Hiroshi Ito

A longtime friend of Helmut's and a former member of the Mach Storm team, Haldo is now a transport pilot who hauls goods in his Gustav. He still supports the team by offering them work, and has helped them out on several occasions. He provided Sigma with his Leostriker, and later helped smuggle the team out of the city after being imprisoned by Alpha. He has piloted several Gustavs in his lifetime and has the control stick of each of them in a display case.

- Jean

Voiced by: Takahiro Sakurai (Japanese); Matt Hill (English)

A skilled acrobat in a circus, Jean was, in fact, a professional Zoid thief working with a gang in Blue City. He tried to woo Ciao, which did not help him out when she discovered his true nature. He and his team were taken out by the PKB, with Ciao personally disabling his modified Arosaurer.

- Keith

Voiced by: Shunsuke Sakuya

A former Zi-Fighter and Amy's former lover, Keith (Kidd in the Japanese version) was soundly beaten in a championship battle and left the league. He returned with a Holotech Sabre Tiger, an unusual Zoid that had the ability to turn invisible and conceal itself from sensory detection. Using the Zoid, he went on a rampage, attacking other Zi-Fighters. He was able to destroy many Zoids including two Blade Ligers, the Dark Assassins' Killer Spiner, and Sigma's Boldguard before being stopped by the Mach Storm team.

- Marvis

Voiced by: Hori Yukitoshi (Japanese); Paul Dobson (English)

A former member of the Mach Storm Team, Marvis used to be Helmut's best friend and Sigma's mentor. However, he had a falling out with the team, which caused him to go on a rampage; killing a member of the PKB. He was hunted down and captured by Helmut, and imprisoned. However, he was able to escape, and tried to get his revenge on Mach Storm. Marvis piloted a Shadow Fox. Marvis is actually working for Alpha, and later ousts Gummie to become the chief of the PKB. After his Shadow Fox is destroyed, he gets a Styluarmor as a replacement. Furthermore, he proclaimed in the battle after his escape from jail that to him, his comrades, and the team were nothing more than stepping stones to become the most powerful Zi-Fighter. This proved true, even going as far as killing Graheme, Sandra's father, years before so his plans would not be ruined. Because he inadvertently sent Sandra down the path of revenge (and in turn, though her own machinations, Blake), one could say Marvis is the catalyst for the rift of hatred between Mach Storm and Savage Hammer.

- Rastani

Voiced by: Katsuyuki Konishi (Japanese); Andrew Kavadas (English)

The leader of the Black Impact team, Rastani is considered to be one of the top pilots in the whole Zi Fighter league until his defeats at the hands of the Dark Assassins and later, RD. He came to see RD as a rival and a threat to his position, and teamed up with several other Zoid pilots to eliminate him from the competition in the Battle Royale-which RD still managed to win. He and the rest of his team pilot customised Blade Ligers. When Rastani was defeated by his brother Reynard and the AI-controlled Chimera Dragon, he began to think better of RD upon hearing him express his disgust toward the tactics of the Chimera BLOX units. He knew that RD was the only person capable of defeating the Chimera Dragon. After the battle, Rastani reclaimed the rights to the Black Impact Team from his brother. He changed from a bitter and spiteful rival to a friendly and decent competitor, an attitude reflected in how he speaks to RD and his nature throughout the episode.

- Rattle and Malloy Dralles

Rattle Voiced by: Daisuke Kirii (Japanese); Matt Hill (English)
Malloy: Voiced by: Takayuki Yamaguchi (Japanese); Samuel Vincent (English)

A pair of rich, young men who fight in the Zi Fighter tournament as the Dark Assassins Team (Dralles team in the Japanese version). Rattle pilots a Killer Dome, while Malloy pilots a Dark Spiner, and the two Zoids are capable of fusing to form the Killer Spiner. The pair of them are somewhat overconfident in their abilities, seeing their Fuzor as being invincible. The Killer Spiner was in the path of Keith's (see below) rampage, along with two Blade Ligers that possibly belonged to Black Impact and Sigma's Boldguard. The brothers can be seen later on in the series, and a Dark Spiner that may or may not have been theirs appears in a few scenes.

- Reynard

Voiced by: Nobuo Tobita (Japanese); Scott McNeil (English)

Rastani's older brother (father in the Japanese version), Reynard is a skilled scientist who wanted his brother/son to follow in his footsteps. When Rastani became a Zoid pilot, a rift formed between the two, leaving Reynard embittered and envious. He created the Chimera Dragon, and used it to take control of the Black Impact team from his brother/son. He is revealed to be yet another subordinate of Alpha as he was seen talking to Burton and later being talked about by Sandra and Alpha. The data from the Chimera Dragon was used later on for the Scissor Storm and Laser Storm BLOX.

- Rotten Roger, Gilbert the Impaler, Sarah Storm

Roger Voiced by: Trevor Devall
Gilbert the Impaler Voiced by: Ward Perry

A trio of Zoid pilots, considered to be three of the best of the league, they piloted a customised Genosaurer, Red Horn and Raynos respectively. The three of them were entered into a battle royale, along with RD and Rastani. Even though the battle was a free-for-all, the four of them teamed up on RD. In they end they were defeated, thanks largely due to Roger deciding to take on the Fuzor all on his own. Though no lines were spoken, all three were present at the final battle against the Seismosaurus. Their names are simply Roger, Gilbert, and Sarah in the Japanese version of the show.

- Samantha and Bourne (Bone?)

A pair of pilots who were the leaders of the Dark Forces, a bandit group who operated in the deserts outside of Blue City. They piloted a Brachiozilla (Brachio Rex) and Missile Tortoise, which had the rather unexpected ability to fuse into the Brachio Tortoise. The group attacked the Mach Storm team in order to steal a cargo that Haldo was transporting.

- Tracy

Voiced by: Haruhi Terada (Japanese); Jocelyne Loewen (English)
The bubbly face of the Zoid Battle Network, who seems to have a crush on RD. Tracy was the person who put forward RD's name to fill the blank spot in the Battle Royale.

- Venus

Voiced by: Tomoko Ishimura (Japanese); Janyse Jaud (English)

A strange girl with a constant optimistic attitude who lived in a forest outside of Blue City, Venus seemed to be able to talk to R.D.'s Liger Zero. She led RD. and the Zoid to a place in the forest where an ancient Zoid was resting. While RD fought Blake, she tried to revive the ancient Zoid, seemingly praying to it, apparently with some help from Matt who somehow heard her voice. The Zoid was the Jet Falcon which was able to fuse with the Liger Zero to form the Liger Zero Falcon. While not explicitly stated, it is implied that Venus was somehow connected to the Fire Phoenix. Evidence of this that she was convincing RD not to run because it's not what his partner would've wanted. Also, when RD (in his mind) told the Fire Phoenix of his success with his new Fuzor, it is Venus (also in her mind) who replies. Later, in the final scene of the episode, RD discovers her hairpin, a phoenix feather, on the ground after she leaves and begins to think that she herself is the Fire Phoenix's reincarnation.

- Vareth

Voiced by: Kenta Miyake (Japanese); Scott McNeil (English)

The leader of a team of mercenaries, Varteth (Baluf in the Japanese version) and his comrades hail from a tribe who forsook technology and left to live in a remote region of the continent. None to bright, Varteth is rather loud and boisterous, often acting the part of a stereotypical Viking. Despite this, and his frequent mistakes, he is the unquestioned leader of his team. He is also a capable warrior, very loyal to his people, and supports the Mach Storm team against Alpha. Vareth's unusual personality is reflected in his Zoid of choice, a Gravity Wolf. He and his two teammates are initially antagonist characters but quickly become RD's allies. Present at the final battle.

- Dart

Voiced by: Kentaro Ito

The second member of Vareth's team, Dart (Tsurugi in the Japanese version) appears to be a ninja of sorts. He always carries a sword, and keeps his face hidden, even when eating. He has a number of unusual personality traits, most notably his refusal to open doors - he prefers to cut them open with his sword. He also seems to have a crush on Sweet. Dart pilots a Gravity Saix. Present at the final battle.

- Sabre

Voiced by: Yuko Sasamoto (Japanese); Janyse Jaud (English)

The third member of the team, Sabre (Fan in the Japanese version) can be considered the most normal of them; although "normal" is a relative term. Like the others, she's rather naive and stands out, often stopping to stare at seemingly normal and mundane things like traffic lights and vending machines. Like the other members of her team, she is a skilled warrior. Sabre pilots a Gravity Saurer. Present at the final battle.

== Reception ==
Despite the success of the previous two Zoids anime series in the United States the series was eventually cancelled halfway through. The cancellation of Hasbro's 'New American Release' model line is also believed to have contributed to the removal of Fuzors from the air. After Fuzors, Zoids disappeared from the U.S. airwaves. However, Fuzors completed its 26-episode run in Australia, and was subsequently shown in Japan.

== Episode list ==
- Episode 1: Knockover on Planet Zi
- Episode 2: 1+1=?
- Episode 3: Enter the Fire Phoenix
- Episode 4: Fuzors Combine! Liger Zero Phoenix
- Episode 5: The Kid Called Matt
- Episode 6: Ambush in the Wasteland
- Episode 7: The Unseen Enemy
- Episode 8: Blue Lightning
- Episode 9: Good Job Peacekeeping Bureau
- Episode 10: Visitor From the Past
- Episode 11: Brutal Battle Royal
- Episode 12: Matt Battled R.D
- Episode 13: Three Teams Face Off
- Episode 14: Awakening of the Evil Dragon
- Episode 15: Lost Wings
- Episode 16: A New Friend
- Episode 17: Nightmare in the Sky
- Episode 18: Glory for the Man
- Episode 19: Showdown at High Noon
- Episode 20: Evolution
- Episode 21: The Water's Surface & The Under Current
- Episode 22: Rampage of the God of Destruction
- Episode 23: The End of Mach Storm
- Episode 24: The Legendary Zoid
- Episode 25: Showdown
- Episode 26: Blue Skys Over Planet Zi

== Animation ==
The computer animation for Fuzors was handled by a new studio, Tokyo Kids. The new studio handling the animation resulted in a different art style from what was seen in the previous series, in terms of both human character design and Zoid CG renderings. A large proportion of the background objects and scenery were created from 3D models, and many large-scale scenes, particularly those in the 'Zoids Battle Arena', were rendered entirely in 3D.

Many of the Zoids featured inferior motion to the previous series, with clumsy looking run cycles. However, many Zoids also featured greater movement of parts and details. Examples include the Fire Phoenix's wing feathers moving as it flies and the wings flapping like a real bird (the model kit's wings could do no such thing), the fins on Gorheks and Gojulas Giga moving as the Zoid walks, and the small antennas on a Dark Horn twitching. The series featured more brand new Zoids than any other previous Zoids series, mostly Blox Zoids.

While the series reused animation models from the earlier shows, several of them were altered. New animation models were also created for some previously seen Zoids. Examples include:

- The Blade Liger received an entirely new animation model, one that was far more accurate to the TOMY model kit.
- The Sabre Tiger's model was altered to include the numerous small cannons that had been omitted in the previous series.
- All the Dark Horns seen sported dual Gattlings and two horns, based on McMann's custom variant from Chaotic Century.
- All the Red Horns featured had Dark horn-style glowing green canopies and powerplants.
- All the Iron Kongs seen in the show featured Gattling cannons on their shoulders in place of their usual weapons; this version was first seen in Zoids: Chaotic Century.
- All the Gun Snipers seen were of the heavily armed custom configuration used by Leena Toros in Zoids: New Century Zero.
- The upper pincer of the Lord Gale's X-Breaker Claw is longer than the bottom, whereas on the model, they are of equal length.

=== Japanese edit ===
Like the previous series, there is a significant difference between the Japanese and American versions. However, where the American versions of the first two series had material removed from them, the Japanese version of Fuzors had new material added to it. The animators took advantage of the year's difference between the American and Japanese releases to alter some elements of the show.

Most of the first thirteen episodes feature differences in footage, usually minor changes through the addition of extra visual effects during fusion sequences. The most notable exception is episode 2, where they scrapped the original version and made a completely new one which was almost entirely different from its American counterpart. This change introduced a continuity error. In the Japanese version of episode 2, the Killer Spiner featured a new transformation sequence completely different from the one used in the American episode. However, in the Japanese version of episode 7, the Killer Spiner uses the same transformation as the American version.

The opening animation of the American version from episode 20 onwards depicts a sequence of the Energy Liger running alongside the Liger Zero Falcon, its energy charger connecting to the Falcon's body. For some reason, this scene never occurred in either the U.S. or Japanese versions.

Daisuke Kishio and Takahiro Sakurai, the voice actors of both previous series' respective heroes Van Flyheight and Bit Cloud respectively, appear in minor roles in this series. Daisuke Kishio voices Mach Storm ally Doug, while Takahiro Sakurai voices the minor villain Jean Holiday.

== Theme songs ==
Opening

- "Enemy of Life" by 2Am (The karaoke version was the ending of the American version.)

Ending

- "Self-Control 2004" by 2Am
