= Nicole Bouma =

Canadian voice actress (born 1981)

- Born: April 24, 1981 (age 45); Vancouver, British Columbia, Canada
- Other name: Nicole Miller
- Occupation: Voice actress
- Years active: 1999–present
- Spouse: Brent Miller
- Children: 2

Nicole Bouma (born April 24, 1981) is a Canadian voice actress who works for Ocean Studios in Vancouver, British Columbia, Canada. She is best known as the voice of Mint Blancmanche from the Galaxy Angel series, Blossom from Powerpuff Girls Z, and Mai from Popotan.

== Personal life ==
Bouna is married to voice actor Brent Miller and together they have two daughters named Chelsea Miller and Jaeda Lily Miller.

== Filmography ==
- Being Ian (TV) as Leni
- Boys Over Flowers (TV) as Makiko Endo
- Coconut Fred's Fruit Salad Island! as Mrs. Eyeball
- Dinosaur Train (TV) as Soren Saurornitholestes
- Dokkoida?! (TV) as Kosuzu Sakurazaki/Tanpopo
- Galaxy Angel (TV) as Mint Blancmanche
- Galaxy Angel A (TV) as Mint Blancmanche
- Galaxy Angel S (TV) as Mint Blancmanche
- Galaxy Angel X (TV) as Mint Blancmanche
- Galaxy Angel Z (TV) as Mint Blancmanche
- Gin Tama (TV) as Ayame Sarutobi
- Holly Hobbie & Friends as Holly Hobbie (Episode 5 & 6)
- Human Crossing (TV) as Office Girl; Woman at Party 2; Young Ryoko
- Inuyasha (TV) as Botan, Hitomi, Shiori
- Inuyasha the Movie: Fire on the Mystic Island as Ai
- Krypto the Superdog (TV) as Snooky Wookums
- Mobile Suit Gundam SEED Destiny (TV) as Meyrin Hawke
- Mobile Suit Gundam 00 (TV) as Nena Trinity
- My Little Pony: Friendship Is Magic (TV) as Rain Shine
- My Scene Jammin' in Jamaica as Chelsea
- My Scene Masquerade Madness as Chelsea
- My Scene Goes Hollywood: The Movie as Chelsea
- Nana as Mai Tsuzuki (Misato Uehara)
- Polly Pocket: Lunar Eclipse as Ana
- Polly Pocket: 2 Cool at the Pocket Plaza as Ana
- PollyWorld as Crissy
- Popotan (TV) as Mai
- Powerpuff Girls Z (TV) as Blossom
- Shakugan no Shana (TV) as Marianne, Matake Ogata (Season 1)
- Star Ocean EX (TV) as Rena Lanford; [+ unlisted credits]
- Starship Operators (TV) as Miyuri Akisato
- The Daichis - Earth Defence Family (TV) as Ellen Shiratori
- Zoids: Fuzors (TV) as Sweet Exter
