= Polly Pocket: 2 Cool at the Pocket Plaza =

- DVD cover
- Directed by: Bill Moore
- Written by: Erin Ehrlich
- Starring: Tegan Moss; Ashleigh Ball; Brittney Wilson; Chiara Zanni; Nicole Bouma; Tabitha St. Germain; Russell Roberts; Pam Hyatt; Ellie Green
- Production companies: Curious Pictures; Mattel Entertainment
- Distributed by: Universal Studios Home Entertainment
- Release date: 2005
- Running time: 22 minutes
- Country: United States
- Language: English

Polly Pocket: 2 Cool at the Pocket Plaza is a 2005 American animated short film based on the Polly Pocket line of dolls. It is the second film in the series (succeeding Polly Pocket: Lunar Eclipse and preceding PollyWorld). Unlike the first film, 2 Cool at the Pocket Plaza received mixed-to-positive reviews. It was packaged with the 2 Cool at the Pocket Plaza Polly and Pia doll pack.

The film has some scene cameos from the 2004 film My Scene: Masquerade Madness.

== Plot ==
Mr. Pocket opens a new six-star hotel, the Pocket Plaza, and Polly and her friends are set to perform at the grand opening. Since it is going to happen over the weekend, Polly has invited a new friend from England, her identical cousin Pia Pocket, who has dreams of being a rock star.

As the girls enjoy the hotel, Pia is told by her chaperone Miss Throckmorton she is not allowed to be in the rock band because anything American is not proper and ladylike, and she should stick to her British heritage. At the same time, Polly's father is held up at an airport in Iceland and Polly now has to present the dedication speech at the hotel opening in his place. Wanting to prove Miss Throckmorton wrong, the girls disguise Pia to look like Polly and teach her about all things American. The girls' plan goes into action with the cousins assuming the opposite's identity, which fools Miss Throckmorton completely. Meanwhile, Polly's jealous rival Beth is suspicious of Polly's sudden change in behavior, eventually meeting the cousins and seeing how identical they are, and plots to use their switch to ruin the ceremony which will be broadcast live.

Miss Throckmorton overhears Beth talking about Pia and Polly's plan and thought Pia disobeyed her, and she runs into Polly, mistaking her for Pia, and grounds her to her hotel room. Pia is forced to take Polly's place at the ceremony with Polly reading her speech over the phone, but Miss Throckmorton catches her and hangs up. However, Pia manages to save the day by improvising with a speech of her own, causing Miss Throckmorton to realize the error of her ways; she apologizes to Polly for kidnapping her, makes amends with Pia, and allows her to pursue her dream of performing with the band. That evening, the Polly and the Pockets performance goes off without a hitch, and Pia joins in and thanks Polly for the best weekend ever.

== Cast ==
- Polly: Tegan Moss
- Pia (British): Ellie Green
- Pia (American): Ashleigh Ball
- Lila: Brittney Wilson
- Lea: Natalie Walters
- Shani: Chiara Zanni
- Ana: Nicole Bouma
- Miss Throckmorton: Pam Hyatt
- Beth: Tabitha St. Germain
- Evie: Jocelyne Loewen
- Tori: Nicole Oliver
- Samuel: Russell Roberts
- Eric Wilder/Todd: Matt Hill
- Rick: Andrew Francis
- Hotel Manager: Colin Murdock
