= Matt Hill =

Canadian voice actor (born 1968)

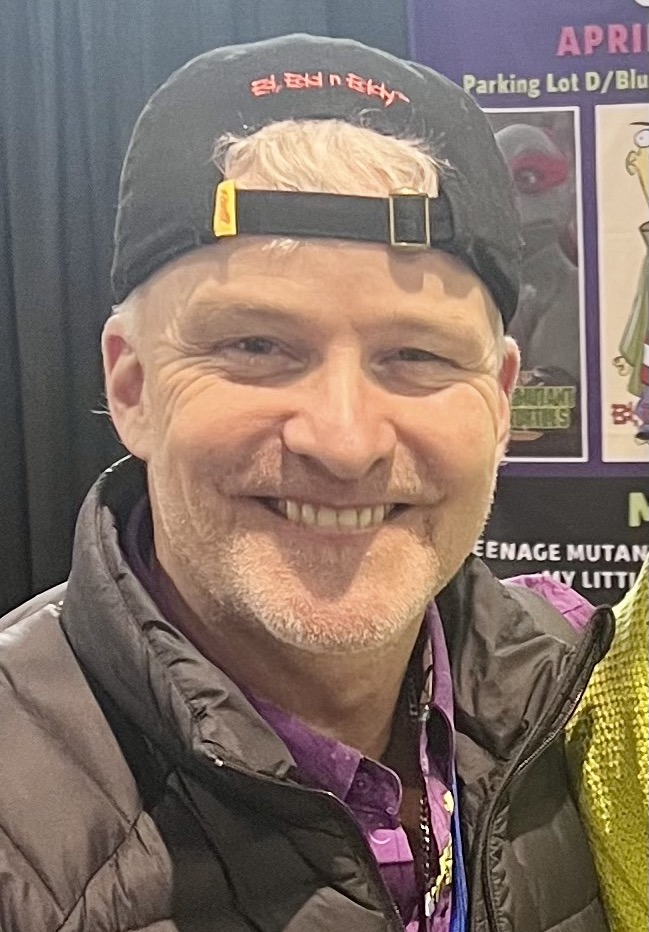
- Hill in 2026
- Born: Matthew Hill; January 19, 1968 (age 58)
- Occupations: Voice actor; motivational speaker; marathon runner
- Years active: 1983–present

Matthew "Matt" Hill (born January 19, 1968) is a Canadian voice actor working for Ocean Productions, best known for playing the role of Ed in Ed, Edd n Eddy.

== Early life ==
Hill was born to Therese Rochford, who was from Edenbridge, England, and David Hill.

== Career ==
Hill's roles include Ed in Ed, Edd n Eddy, Kevin Keene/Captain N in Captain N: The Game Master, Kira Yamato in Gundam Seed and Gundam Seed Destiny, Raphael in Ninja Turtles: The Next Mutation, Ryo Sanada in Ronin Warriors, Carlos in Transformers: Armada, Ironhide in Transformers: Energon, and Artha Penn and Dragon Booster in Dragon Booster. He is also the voice of the Wonderbolt Soarin' in My Little Pony: Friendship Is Magic.

Hill and Samuel Vincent are often cast together as friends, such as in the Cartoon Network programme Ed, Edd n Eddy, with Ed (Hill) and Edd (Vincent) and as the two protagonists of the Mobile Suit Gundam SEED franchise; Kira Yamato (Hill) and Athrun Zala (Vincent).

Hill is often cast as teenagers due his youthful-sounding voice. Hill's live-action role was his portrayal of Raphael in Teenage Mutant Ninja Turtles III and Ninja Turtles: The Next Mutation. He also played the deputy in the live-action film Shanghai Knights, as well as a dramatized version of Jack Phillips in Titanic.

== Personal life ==
Besides acting, Hill is also an active athlete and avid marathon runner.

== Filmography ==
=== Voice roles ===
==== Anime (dubbing performances) ====
- Battle B-Daman – Announcer Guy
- Beyblade Burst — Rantaro Kiyama (Seasons 1–2, replaced by Kevin K. Gomez)
- Cardcaptors – Kero (borrowed form)
- Galaxy Angel A – Cat Bandit
- Gundam Seed – Kira Yamato
- Gundam Seed Special Edition – Kira Yamato
- Gundam Seed Destiny – Kira Yamato
- Gundam Seed Destiny Special Edition – Kira Yamato
- .hack//Roots – Hideyo
- Hakkenden – Gakuso
- Hamtaro – Roberto
- Hello Carbot — S-Line and Sonic Boom
- Inuyasha – Bankotsu
- Kingdom series – Mou Ten
- Little Battlers Experience – Keita Morigami
- Master Keaton – Dean
- MegaMan NT Warrior – Bass.EXE, AquaMan.EXE
- Mobile Suit Gundam – Additional voices
- Monster Rancher – Mew
- Please Save My Earth – Mikuro
- Powerpuff Girls Z – Poochi
- Ranma ½ – Pantyhose Taro (season 6–7)
- Ronin Warriors/Yoroiden Samurai Troopers – Ryo Sanada (真田 リョウ)
- Star Ocean EX TV Series – Claude C. Kenni
- Tara Duncan – Caliban Dal Salan
- Transformers: Armada – Carlos
- Transformers: Energon – Carlos, Ironhide
- Tobot — Tobot Y

==== Animation ====
- Imaginext: Fortress of the Dragon (2003) – Zack
- 2 Cool at the Pocket Plaza – Eric Wilder, Todd
- A Kidnapping in the Family – Chris Landers
- A Fairytale Christmas – Dash, Bandit #1
- A Monkey's Tale – Kom
- Alexis and Milton – Bully
- Ardie the Aardvark – Irwin the Ant
- The Barbie Diaries – Kevin
- Battery Mates – Danny
- Bible Stories – Young Traveller
- Billy the Cat – Swift K.I.D.
- Captain N: The Game Master – Kevin Keene
- Cosmic Quantum Ray – Scott
- Courage the Cowardly Dog – Teddy Bears
- Crash of the Titans – Additional voices
- Dead Like Me – Icarus Jones
- Def Jam: Fight for NY – Clean Cut
- Dino Babies – Stanley
- Dogboy – Narrator
- Dragon Booster – Artha Penn, Dragon Booster
- Dragon Tales – The Grudge
- Ed, Edd n Eddy – Ed
- Ed, Edd n Eddy's Big Picture Show - Ed
- Fat Dog Mendoza – Additional voices
- Fatal Fury: The Motion Picture – Laocorn Gaudeamus, Duck King
- February 15, 1839 – Soldat McDonald
- Finley the Fire Engine – Miguel
- Firehouse Tales – Additional voices
- Funky Fables – Various
- G.I. Joe Extreme – Matthew 'Metal Head' Hurley
- G.I. Joe: Spy Troops – Beach Head
- Generation O! – Buzz O!
- George of the Jungle – Additional voices
- GeoTrax – Eric
- High School Lives – Billy
- Home Movies – Fireman, Hotel Manager
- Hurricanes – Indian Boy
- Jetix – Voice
- Johnnor in Japan – Johnnor Symmes
- Journey to GloE - Bear
- LeapFrog – Additional voices
- ¡Mucha Lucha! – Timmy of a Thousand Masks
- Madeline – Additional voices
- Madison – Billy
- Make Way for Noddy – Whizz (US Dub)
- Martha Speaks – Kazuo
- Martin Mystery – Antonio
- Melrose Place – Hank
- Monster Rancher – Mew
- Mummies Alive! – Additional voices
- My Little Pony: Friendship Is Magic – Soarin', Spear
- NBA Street Vol. 2 – Various
- Ninja Turtles: The Next Mutation – Raphael (voice)
- Pac-Man and the Ghostly Adventures – Skeebo
- Polly Pocket: Lunar Eclipse – Todd
- Polly Pocket: 2 Cool at the Pocket Plaza – Todd/Eric Wilder
- PollyWorld – Todd/DJ (voice)
- Rainbow Fish – Barry Cuda
- Rudolph the Red-Nosed Reindeer: The Movie – Arrow/Donner (voice)
- Sabrina's Secret Life – Additional voices
- Shadow Raiders – Prince Pyrus
- Silverwing - Chinook
- Sitting Ducks – Additional voices
- Sleepwalkers – Andy
- Slugterra – Mario Brevado
- Special Unit 2 – Richie
- Street Fighter – Gang Kid, Henchman
- Street Sharks – Jab/Clint Bolton
- Supernoobs - Tyler Bowman
- Taken – Willie
- The Bots Master – Watzon
- The Adventures of the Black Stallion – Danny Booth
- The Adventures of Corduroy – Corduroy
- The Baby Huey Show – Bully
- The Barbie Diaries – Kevin
- The Condor – Skragg
- The Grim Adventures of the KND - Ed (uncredited)
- The Little Prince – Sahara (Planet of the Amicopes)
- The New Adventures of Peter Pan – Peter Pan
- The Sentinel – Deputy Toliver
- The Ten Commandments – Joshua
- Titanic – Jack Phillips
- Trollz – Rock Trollhammer
- War Planets – Prince Pyrus
- Wendell, Son of Santa – Various
- Wondrous Myths and Legends – Broden
- X-Men: Evolution – Havok/Alex Masters
- X-Play – The Teenies
- Zigby – Bertie
- Zoids Fuzors – Rattle, Bartender, Jean Holiday

==== Live-action voice roles ====
- Ninja Turtles: The Next Mutation - Raphael

=== Video games ===
List of voice and English dubbing performances in video games
Year	Title	Role	Notes	Ref.
2000	Midtown Madness 2	Announcer		
2002	Ty the Tasmanian Tiger	Andy the Wombat		
2003	Rayman 3: Hoodlum Havoc	Teensies		
2004	Def Jam: Fight for NY	Hero (Clean Cut)		
2004	World of Warcraft	Male Gnome		
2005	Inuyasha: Feudal Combat	Bankotsu		
2005	Mobile Suit Gundam SEED: Never Ending Tomorrow	Kira Yamato		
2005	Ed, Edd n Eddy: The Mis-Edventures	Ed		
2007	Dynasty Warriors: Gundam	Ortega		
2009	Cartoon Network Universe: FusionFall	Ed		
2010	Dynasty Warriors: Gundam 3	Kira Yamato		
2024	Teppen	Bass.EXE		

=== Live-action roles ===
==== Film ====
- Bordello of Blood – Reggie
- Shanghai Knights – the Deputy
- Teenage Mutant Ninja Turtles III – Raphael (suit actor)
- Watchers – Boy on bike
- See Grace Fly - School Security Guard

==== Television ====
- Dead Like Me – Icarus Jones (Episode: "Death Defying")
- Honey, I Shrunk the Kids: The TV Show – Kyle Spritzenegger
- Jake 2.0 – Kevin (1 episode)
- Neon Rider – Keith
- Tales from the Crypt – Reggie
- The X-Files – Private Dunham (Episode: "Fresh Bones")

Preceded by Michael McConnohie	Voice of Ironhide; 2005	Succeeded by Jess Harnell
