= My Scene Goes Hollywood: The Movie =

- DVD cover
- Directed by: Eric Fogel
- Written by: Elise Allen
- Produced by: Kallan Kagan; Nancy Bennett
- Starring: Kelly Sheridan; Kathleen Barr; Nicole Bouma; Tegan Moss; Meghan Black; Brenda Crichlow
- Edited by: Anthony V. Orkin
- Music by: Chris Hajian
- Production companies: Miramax Family; Curious Pictures; Mattel Entertainment
- Distributed by: Buena Vista Home Entertainment
- Release date: August 30, 2005
- Running time: 70 minutes
- Country: United States
- Language: English

My Scene Goes Hollywood: The Movie is a 2005 American animated romantic comedy film based on Mattel's line of My Scene dolls. It features Barbie and American singer and actress Lindsay Lohan, who plays herself. It is the third feature with the My Scene characters, and the only one that was full-length. The film was directed by Eric Fogel. Although the title of the film suggests a trip to Hollywood, California, the entire plot takes place in New York City, where all the My Scene characters live. It was released by Buena Vista Home Entertainment under the Miramax Family label.

The film received renewed attention in 2017 following the Harvey Weinstein sexual abuse cases due to Harvey Weinstein voicing a fictionalized version of himself in the film. Producer Nancy Bennett stated that she was "mortified" that she had put him in a Barbie film.

== Plot ==
The My Scene girls are attending high school in Manhattan when they find out there's a new teen spy movie called "Spy Society" being filmed there, starring Lindsay Lohan (playing Laural St. Clair, the movie's lead character) and Ryan Ridley (who plays Lohan's love interest in the movie). While Barbie, Chelsea, Madison, Nolee and Delancey go to watch the movie being filmed, they get the idea to sneak onto the set by pretending to be extras.

While working as extras for the movie, the girls quickly learn that there's actually a lot of work that goes into making a movie, such as getting to the set ridiculously early in the day and doing hours and hours of takes on a single scene—Chelsea also keeps getting terrible jobs around the set, like "towel girl," "trash girl" and even being forced to clean up after the horses that are being used in the movie. The girls imagine themselves becoming best friends with Lindsay Lohan, who turns out to be genuinely nice and down-to-earth and ends up actually becoming friends with them.

When one of the actresses gets hurt on their way to the set and is unable to play her part, Madison's called in to take her place. The actress she's replacing plays the movie's lead female villain, although the character only has five speaking lines.

After a while, the fame starts going to Madison's head. She begins thinking that she and Ryan are dating as they always go out together and the tabloids refer to her as "Ryan's Mystery Girl". When Madison gets invited to a party with Ryan and Lindsay, her friends show up to surprise her. However, Madison is very rude to them, pretending that she doesn’t know them. She starts acting and dressing like a diva and avoids her lifelong friends. This causes her friends to become mad at her and start avoiding Madison as well.

When the shooting is about to wrap in New York, Madison asks Ryan how they will handle their relationship. Ryan's surprised to hear her say this and admits that he doesn't see Madison as his girlfriend, leaving Madison heartbroken at the realization that Ryan never felt the same way about her as she did about him. Lindsay happens to witness this and goes to tell the other girls about this. But they're still angry with Madison for how she had been treating them, so they initially refuse to help her and make it clear to Lindsay that they all feel Madison deserves. But this upsets Lindsay, who notes that despite everything that happened, Madison needs them now more than ever. Hearing this, the girls get over their anger towards Madison and go to her apartment. Madison apologizes to the girls for how she acted towards them, and they all make amends.

Six months later, the girls all go to the red carpet premiere of the movie, where they meet up with Lindsay. After Ryan arrives at the premiere, he tries getting Madison and Lindsay's attention, but they ignore him and go to watch the movie with their friends.

== Cast ==
- Kelly Sheridan as Barbie
- Kathleen Barr as Madison (named Westley in Europe)
- Tegan Moss as Nolee
- Meghan Black as Delancey
- Nicole Bouma as Chelsea
- Brenda Crichlow as Audra
- Mark Hildreth as Sutton
- Alessandro Juliani as River
- Terry Klassen as Jim
- Shane Meier as Ellis
- Kirby Morrow as Hudson
- Samuel Vincent as Ryan
- Ashleigh Ball as Kenzie
- Lindsay Lohan as herself
- Harvey Weinstein as himself
- Aden Hakimi as Paparazzi (uncredited)

== Soundtrack ==
There is no album made for the songs played in the movie.

1. Lucky - Leslie Mills
2. I Feel Like L.A. - Leslie Mills
3. Find the Fun - Leslie Mills
4. Playground (Instrumental)
5. Find the Fun (Instrumental)
6. Starlight - Leslie Mills
7. Lucky (Reprise)
8. Playground - Andrea Remanda

== Reception ==
My Scene Goes Hollywood: The Movie earned negative reviews.

Lacey Worrell of DVDTalk gave the movie a negative review, writing that "The plot of this movie is paper-thin, made even more nauseating by frequent mention of teen queen and guest voiceover artist Lindsay Lohan, who at this point in her career is overexposed at best, her drama-fueled personal life having overshadowed her acting talents. Revolving around the cliché of friends-forever, it's nothing you that hasn't already been done many, many times by Mary-Kate and Ashley Olsen. And the acting is just as wooden. The message also appears to be that, regardless of skin color or ethnic background, everyone can be just as vacuous as Barbie!" She ended the review saying "Not all entertainment aimed at children needs to be educational, because let's face it, adults seek escape through entertainment all the time. But the entire presentation of this DVD is vapid and unrealistic; it goes beyond superficial and into the inane. How about a little substance with the style next time?".
