= The Family's Defensive Alliance =

Japanese anime television series

地球防衛家族 (Chikyū Bōei Kazoku)
- Genre: Comedy, Science fiction
- Anime television series
- Directed by: Tetsu Kimura
- Produced by: Minoru Takanashi; Hiroshi Sakurai; Tsutomu Onishi
- Written by: Shōji Kawamori
- Music by: Shigeo Naka
- Studio: Group TAC
- Licensed by: NA: Geneon
- Original network: WOWOW, Animax
- English network: SEA: Animax Asia
- Original run: January 9, 2001 – March 29, 2001
- Episodes: 13

The Family's Defensive Alliance (地球防衛家族, Chikyū Bōei Kazoku; lit. Earth Defence Family) is an anime television series created and written by Shōji Kawamori. The series premiered in Japan on WOWOW between January 9, 2001, and March 29, 2001, spanning a total of 13 episodes. It centers on a dysfunctional family tasked with defending the Earth from alien invaders.

The series was aired by the anime television network Animax across its respective networks worldwide, including its English language networks in Southeast Asia and South Asia under the title The Family's Defensive Alliance. It was released on DVD in North America by Geneon under the title The Daichis: Earth Defense Family, but was not broadcast across the region.

== Plot ==
The opening scenes of the anime show the Daichis in a furious argument over a divorce petition. Suddenly a bright flash of light blinds them completely and they are shown their future roles to be played as defenders of the earth.
Reluctant at first, they are forced to accept the responsibility, as refusal means a court-martial from the Galaxy Federation (their employers) and a hundred years of penal servitude. Seiko always gets infuriated at the end of every mission as every weapon they use costs them more money than they are paid for doing their job(s). In fact, this reason is used as a basis for one of the later episodes in the show.
As earth's defenders, they have to fight against threats the earth faces from extraterrestrials. The invaders are usually bizarre in nature, ranging from floating eyes, to alien toys, to heart shaped spacecraft, to a floating weapons factory, to a giant plant, to a creature that resembles the Soviet Emblem and uses a hammer-and-sickle attack. Over the course of the series, the Daichis learn to resolve their differences and become a close knit family while overcoming the alien invaders.

== Main characters ==
Dai Daichi (大地 大, Daichi Dai)
Voiced by: Motoko Kumai (Japanese); Danny McKinnon (English)
A problem child of the worst kind, he is hyperactive and doesn't think twice before he does anything, which usually puts him in a spot most of the time. He hates his dysfunctional family life, but at times is capable of showing considerable filial emotions and loyalty. And he has a big-time problem with his arrogant sister, Nozomi, although he still cares.
He also has an unusual pet with him which he names "Weird".
Nozomi Daichi (大地 望, Daichi Nozomi)
Voiced by: Kaori Shimizu (Japanese); Anna Cummer (English)
Dai's older sister, an unhappy and anxious girl. Her weariness and angst are a result of her mother making her do all the housework. As the series progresses, she gradually grows more confident. She has a liking for rock music, as shown in the third episode of the anime. She frequently gets annoyed by Dai but still cares for him.
Seiko Daichi (大地 聖子, Daichi Seiko)
Voiced by: Mami Koyama (Japanese); Lisa Ann Beley (English)
A flirtatious, money-hungry lady and a snob who is the mother of Nozomi and Dai. She is extremely mean and has a hint of sadism. She is extremely vain and cares for nothing save for herself, and has a very irritable temper. As the series progresses, she grows to become more compassionate and considerate.
She also has an affair during the series with a colleague at work, Hayakawa, a photographer by profession, but she breaks up with him shortly before the end of the anime. Despite her mean streak and her initial desire for a divorce, deep down, Seiko loves her family and their life together.
Mamoru Daichi (大地 衛, Daichi Mamoru)
Voiced by: Akira Kamiya (Japanese); John Murphy (English)
Dai and Nozomi's father who is a half-absent IT-professional. He is almost always clueless about the situation around him. He is very overweight and gluttonous, typically snacking and eating during his lighter moments. Despite his gluttonous habits, the man is highly intelligent and sensitive otherwise.
Mild-mannered and easily frightened, he is the most comedic member of the cast. Nonetheless, he dearly loves his family and wishes to keep a close family bond. He is very kind, gentle, and fundamentally decent, but he is very absent-minded and clumsy, especially in social situations.
Ellen Shiratori (白鳥エレン, Shiratori Eren)
Voiced by: Akiko Yajima (Japanese); Nicole Bouma (English)
The alien who recruited the Daichis as an earth defense force, she is a very small girl, appearing the same age as Daichi. Level-headed for the most part, she oversees the functionality of the defensive group and reports to her superiors about their status from time to time. She is also the one who makes sure that the identities of the "superhumans", as the public calls them, are never discovered. It seems that Daichi has a crush on her and the feeling seems to be mutual. It's revealed in Episode 13 that Ellen is in fact a fairy-like giant with powers to teleport and is strong enough to withstand a nuclear explosion. She receives her orders aboard a silver saucer-shaped spaceship. Flashbacks hint that Ellen as a baby was rocketed off her home planet before it exploded.

== Episodes ==
No.	Title	Script	Original release date
1	"Earth's Final Day" "Chikyū Saigo no Hi" (地球最期の日)	Shōji Kawamori	January 9, 2001
2	"The Broken Family" "Minna Barabara" (みんなバラバラ)	Shōji Kawamori	January 16, 2001
3	"Yellow Card" "Ierō Kādo" (いえろおかあど)	Shōji Kawamori	January 23, 2001
4	"Surprise! The Daichi Family's Weird" "Gyōten! Daichi-ke no Hen" (仰天!大地家の変)	Shōji Kawamori	January 30, 2001
5	"Special Training! Sleepless Nights" "Tokkun! Nemurenai Yoru" (特訓!眠れない夜)	Shōji Kawamori	February 6, 2001
6	"Soldier's repose" "Senshi no kyūsoku" (戦士の休息)	Shōji Kawamori	February 13, 2001
7	"That guy in the rain (?)" "Ame no Naka no Aitsu" (雨の中のアイツ)	Mamehira Magata	February 20, 2001
8	"Cute Invaders" "Kawaii Shinryakusha" (かわいい侵略者)	Hiroshi Ōnogi	February 27, 2001
9	"The day Love destroyed the Earth" "Ai ga Chikyū o Horobosu Hi" (愛が地球を滅ぼす日)	Katsuyuki Sumisawa	March 6, 2001
10	"Eight p.m., before Hachiko" "Hachikō-mae, Yoru Hachi-ji" (ハチ公前、夜8時)	Mamehira Magata	March 13, 2001
11	"Shudder! The deep darkness of the Daichi family (" "Senritsu! Daichi-ke no Fukai Yami" (戦慄!大地家の深い闇)	Hiroshi Ōnogi	March 20, 2001
12	"Berth D in flames" "Honno no Bāsu Di" (炎のバースディ)	Shōji Kawamori	March 27, 2001
13	"Decisive battle! Flowers for you..." "Kessen! Hanataba o Kimi ni" (決戦! 花束を君に...)	Shōji Kawamori	March 29, 2001
The EDF has just finished defeating a gigantic plant monster, with some help from Ellen. Back at the family's apartment, Ellen has a painful allergic reaction to spores that escaped from the plant. The spores cause her to continuously grow larger and larger. Dai must bring her a special kind of flower whose nectar can cure her.
14	"Into the Depths of Marital Hell" "Zekkyō! Ai no Meikyū Jigoku" (絶叫!愛の迷宮地獄)	Hiroshi Ōnogi	none
Never televised after being called overly violent

== Staff ==
Screenplay, Original Story Concept, and Mechanical Designs: Shōji Kawamori
Director: Tetsu Kimura

=== Music ===
Shigeo Naka of The Surf Coasters provides the score for the anime. The opening theme is "Samurai" by Rolly, and the ending is Hana no Katachi (花のかたち) by Akino Arai.

== Reception ==
The show was generally, although not universally, well received. Chris Beveridge of Mania.com called it "an under the radar show that's been quite a lot of fun" and said "With just three volumes it's a great little show to check out with little commitment and definitely qualifies as one of those rough gems that you come across when you aren't looking for it." Carlo Santos, writing for Anime News Network, "The idea of lampooning clichéd anime genres is nothing new, but The Daichis is one of the few shows that gets it right... Even amid the absurdity, there are some remarkably true-to-life moments... that make The Daichis a real family story and not just a farce." Santos urged readers "Don't miss out on this surprisingly good series."

John Sinnett on DVD Talk highly recommended it as "a funny show that always brings a smile to my face."

In a review for DVD Verdict.com, Joel Pearce was "not impressed" with the series after watching the first two DVD volumes from Geneon: "The biggest problem with the series is the development team's reliance on the same small well of jokes, and it's already getting dry." However he did acknowledge the anime's "solid animation and voice work" and said that "Whether you choose to listen to the original language track or the English dub, the characters are well-portrayed, and just as annoying as your own dysfunctional family."
