= Tabitha St. Germain =

Canadian actress

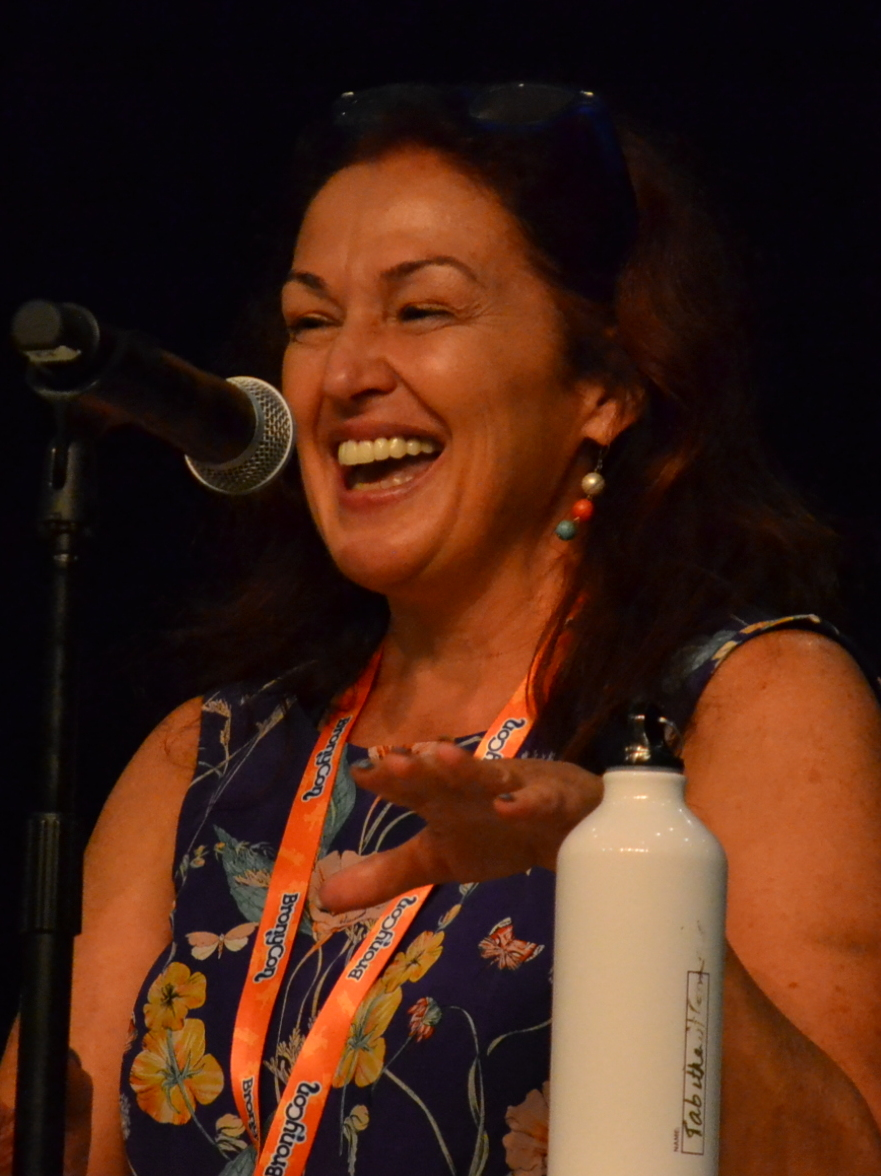
- St. Germain in 2016
- Born: 1962 or 1963 (age 63); Boston, Massachusetts, U.S.
- Other names: Paulina Gillis; Kitanou St. Germain
- Education: Dalhousie University
- Occupation: Actress
- Years active: 1985–present
- Website: tabithastgermain.com

Tabitha St. Germain (born 1962 or 1963), formerly known as Paulina Gillis and also known as Kitanou St. Germain, is a Canadian actress. Her best known roles include Shana in Shakugan no Shana (2006–07), Roberta in Black Lagoon (2007), Naomi Misora in Death Note (2007), Rarity and Princess Luna in My Little Pony: Friendship Is Magic (2010–19), and Pepper Clark in Littlest Pet Shop (2012–16).

== Early life and career ==
Tabitha St. Germain was formerly known as Paulina Gillis. She attended private schools in South Africa while her father worked for development agencies in Swaziland. She made her first stage appearance at age 8 as Tiny Tim in a production of A Christmas Carol, and then made frequent appearances in Gilbert and Sullivan operettas. She moved to Canada in 1980 and studied theatre at Dalhousie University in Halifax, Nova Scotia, making her professional debut in South Pacific at Huron County Playhouse. Gillis was raised in the Catholic faith, but left it and found another which, by 1984, she also abandoned. She won a Dora Award in 1995 for her performance in Assassins, the Stephen Sondheim musical. She legally changed her name to Tabitha St. Germain in November 1997.

== Filmography ==
=== Web productions ===
- #Tweet It: Featuring My Little Pony Staff and Bronies – Herself (music video)
- BlackGryph0n's 50,000 Subscribers Special – Herself (video)

=== Live-action films ===
- And Then There Was One – ICU nurse (as Paulina Gillis)
- Bronies: The Extremely Unexpected Adult Fans of My Little Pony – Rarity (archive sound)

=== Animation ===
==== as Tabitha St. Germain ====
- 1001 Nights – Donyazad
- Angry Birds: Summer Madness – Lynette, Brenda
- Ark – Empress Cathebel
- Barbie: Fairytopia – Dandelion, Topaz
- Barbie Fairytopia: Mermaidia – Dandelion, Teeny Mermaid
- Barbie Fairytopia: Magic of the Rainbow – Dandelion, Topaz
- The Barbie Diaries – Other Sales Girl
- Barbie in a Christmas Carol – Spirit of Christmas Past, Seamstress, Baby
- Barbie: Mariposa and her Butterfly Fairy Friends – Willa, Coral, Flutterpixie
- Barbie Presents: Thumbelina – Chrysella
- Barbie and the Three Musketeers – Miette Walla
- Barbie in A Mermaid Tale – Zuma, Deanne
- Barbie in A Mermaid Tale 2 – Zuma
- Barbie: Princess Charm School – Grace, Lorraine
- Barbie: A Fashion Fairytale – Marie-Alecia "Alice"
- Barbie in the Pink Shoes – Madame Natasha/The Snow Queen, Sugar Plum Fairy, Swan Dancer, Stage Manager
- Barbie: Mariposa & the Fairy Princess – Willa, Zee
- Barbie & Her Sisters in A Pony Tale – Max
- Barbie: The Pearl Princess – Purple Mer-teen
- Barbie and the Secret Door – Malucia
- Barbie in Princess Power – Parker
- Being Ian – Sandi Crocker
- Bionicle 2: Legends of Metru Nui – Nokama
- Bionicle 3: Web of Shadows – Nokama
- Braceface – Christy Lee
- Captain Flamingo – Milo Powell/Captain Flamingo
- Care Bears: Adventures in Care-a-Lot – Cheer Bear
- Chuck's Choice – Misha's Mom
- Class of the Titans – Persephone, Aphrodite, Psyche
- The Cramp Twins – Mari Phelps
- Dinosaur Train – Shirley Stygimoloch, Spiky Stygimoloch, Keenan Chirostenotes, Mrs. Conductor (Tabitha Troodon), Patricia Palaeobatrachus, Minnie Microraptor, Mikey Microraptor, Angela Avisaurus, Mrs. Deinonychus, Arlene Archaeopteryx, Cindy Cimolestes, Sonja Styracosaurus, and Stephie Styracosaurus
- D'Myna Leagues – Nikki Tinker
- Doggie Daycare – Cookie
- Dorg Van Dango – Patronella
- Dragon Booster – Spratt
- Dreamkix – Emily
- Ed, Edd n Eddy – Nazz (1999)
- Endangered Species – Pickle, Dilly
- Generation O! – Eddie
- George of the Jungle – Magnolia, Tooky Tooky
- Help! I'm a Fish – Eel
- Hero: 108 – Alpha Girl Latifah, Archer Lee, Rattle Diva, Peacock Queen
- Holly and Hal Moose: Our Uplifting Christmas Adventure – Worker Elf
- Iron Man: Armored Adventures – Maria Hill
- Jimmy Two-Shoes – Heloise
- Johnny Test (2021 TV series) – Ms. Shush, Gabbler, Old Lady
- Kate & Mim-Mim – Lilly
- Kid vs. Kat – Phoebe, Mrs. Brannigan
- Krypto the Superdog – Andrea Sussman, Melanie Whitney
- League of Super Evil – Cougar, Elizabeth "Lightning Liz" Sergeant, Goldenrod, Miss B. Mean
- Littlest Pet Shop – Pepper Mildred Clark, additional voices
- Littlest Pet Shop: A World of Our Own – Flinty Golden, Gigi Monkeyford, Dara Longville, Racehorse, Willow Longstout, Sultanna Siam, Dooley Wolfhound, Loudspeaker, Sasha Siberio, Breezy Laperm, Blutty Cattily, Elly Phanto, Tessa, Aloha Hawaiian Cat
- LoliRock – Auriana, Amaru, Aunt Ellen, Carissa, others
- Make Way for Noddy – Dinah Doll
- Martha Speaks – Martha Lorraine, Mariela Lorraine, Jake Lorraine
- Martin Mystery – Jenni Anderson
- Maya the Bee – Ben, Zoe and Lisby
- Monster Buster Club – Wendy, John
- ¡Mucha Lucha! – Penny Plutonium
- ¡Mucha Lucha!: The Return of El Maléfico – Bride, Duchess, Tourist Gal, Female Vegas Singer
- My Little Pony (direct-to-video animated specials) – Minty, Thistle Whistle, Wysteria, Fiesta Flair and Scootaloo
- My Little Pony: Friendship Is Magic – Rarity, Princess Luna/Nightmare Moon, Granny Smith, Muffins, Mrs. Cake, Princess Flurry Heart, Photo Finish, additional voices
- My Little Pony: Equestria Girls – Rarity, Princess/Vice Principal Luna, Mrs. Cake
- My Little Pony: Equestria Girls – Rainbow Rocks – Rarity, Vice Principal Luna, Photo Finish
- My Little Pony: Equestria Girls – Friendship Games – Rarity, Vice Principal Luna
- My Little Pony: Equestria Girls – Legend of Everfree – Rarity, Vice Principal Luna, Muffins
- My Little Pony: Equestria Girls – Magical Movie Night – Rarity, Patron
- My Little Pony: Equestria Girls – Canterlot Shorts – Rarity, Photo Finish, Granny Smith
- My Little Pony: Equestria Girls (web series) – Rarity, Lily Pad, Granny Smith, Sunny Sugarsocks, Photo Finish
- My Little Pony: Pony Life – Rarity, Spike
- My Little Pony: The Movie – Rarity, Princess Luna, Granny Smith, Muffins
- My Little Pony: Best Gift Ever – Rarity, Muffins, Princess Flurry Heart
- My Little Pony: Rainbow Roadtrip – Rarity
- My Little Pony: Equestria Girls – Forgotten Friendship – Rarity, Princess/Vice Principal Luna
- My Little Pony: Equestria Girls – Rollercoaster of Friendship – Rarity, Granny Smith
- My Little Pony: Equestria Girls – Spring Breakdown – Rarity
- My Little Pony: Equestria Girls – Sunset's Backstage Pass – Rarity
- My Little Pony: Equestria Girls – Holidays Unwrapped – Rarity, Vice Principal Luna, Granny Smith, and Photo Finish
- My Little Pony: A New Generation – Rarity
- Nerds and Monsters – Dudley Squat, Becky Hooger, Craboon
- Nina's World – Claire, Mrs. Goldstein, Star, Flamingo, Big Sister Bear, Fair Patron, Squirrel #1
- Ninjago – Mystake (Season 8–9), Akita (Secrets of Forbidden Spinjitzu)
- Ninjago: Dragons Rising – Gandalaria, Tox
- The Nutty Professor – Robin
- Pac-Man and the Ghostly Adventures – Rotunda, Grannie
- Packages from Planet X – Calimary, Dan's Grandmother, Amanda's Mother
- Pocket Dragon Adventures – Binky
- Polly Pocket – Beth
- Polly Pocket: 2 Cool at the Pocket Plaza – Beth
- Polly Pocket: PollyWorld – Beth
- Popeye's Voyage: The Quest for Pappy – Olive Oyl, Swee'Pea
- Pucca – Pucca, Ring Ring
- Ratchet & Clank – Juanita Alvaro
- Rated A for Awesome – Mr. Twitchy
- Ready Jet Go! – Auntie Eggplant
- RollBots – Tinny
- Sabrina: Secrets of a Teenage Witch – Hilda Spellman, Veralupa
- Scary Godmother: Halloween Spooktakular – Scary Godmother, Ruby
- Scary Godmother: The Revenge of Jimmy – Scary Godmother, Ruby
- Sing Along with Barbie – Additional voices
- Skatoony – Heloise
- Slugterra – Desdemona, Little Boy, Cantina Tough Woman
- Storm Hawks – Dove
- Sunburnt Unicorn
- Supernoobs – Jennifer Shope, Sue Newswoman, Mrs. Craberton
- Team Galaxy – Brett
- Team Zenko Go – Ponzu, Donna, Fawna, Rona
- A Very Fairy Christmas – Shaily
- Voltron Force − Kala
- The Legend of Zelda − Spryte
- Weird-Ohs – Portia
- Yakkity Yak – Penelope
- Zeke's Pad – Ida Palmer, Chester

==== as Paulina Gillis ====
- ALF: The Animated Series and ALF Tales – Augie Shumway, Rhonda
- The Adventures of Super Mario Bros. 3 and Super Mario World – Kootie Pie Koopa
- The Care Bears Family – Swift Heart Rabbit
- C.O.P.S. – Ms. Demeanor
- Dog City – Kitty
- Little Rosey – Tess
- The Littlest Angel – Littlest Angel
- Star Wars: Ewoks – Asha
- Swamp Thing – Abigail Arcane
- Tales from the Cryptkeeper – Sally, Zola

=== Anime ===
- .hack//Roots – Asta, Nazo Grunty
- Black Lagoon – Roberta
- Death Note – Naomi Misora
- Dragon Drive – Chibisuke
- Earth Girl Arjuna – Sayuri Shirakawa
- Galaxy Angel S – Ranpha Franboise
- Galaxy Angel X – Ranpha Franboise
- Hamtaro – Pashmina
- Infinite Ryvius – Criff Kei
- Let's Go Quintuplets – Krystal
- MegaMan NT Warrior – Maddy
- Mix Master – Pachi
- Gundam SEED – Flay Allster, Birdy (Torii), Haro
- Gundam SEED Destiny – Birdy (Torii), Haro, Abby Windsor, Hilda Harken
- Gundam 00 – Soma Peries, Haro
- Popotan – Konami, Unagi, Magical Girl Lilo
- Powerpuff Girls Z – Miss Keane, Ivy, Violet, Sapphire
- Shakugan no Shana (Season 1) – Shana
- Sword of the Stranger – Mu-Mao
- Transformers: Armada – Alexis
- Transformers: Energon – Alexis
- Transformers: Cybertron – Professor Lucy Suzuki
- Zoids Fuzors – Sandra, Ciao, Female TV Announcer

=== Live-action television ===
- The New Addams Family – Melancholia, Catastrophia
- Supernatural – Nikolai's Friend

=== Video games ===
- Devil Kings – Bramble (English version)
- Dynasty Warriors Gundam 2 – Haro (English version), Tutorial Operator
- Dragalia Lost – Estelle, Mym (Halloween), Althemia, Myriam (English version)
- Mobile Suit Gundam: Encounters in Space – Soldiers, Pilots (English version)
- My Little Pony: Friendship Is Magic – Rarity, Princess Luna/Nightmare Moon, Mrs. Cake
- Thimbleweed Park - Additional voices
- Under the Skin – Cosmi, Annie Campbell, Princess Cleo (English version)
