= Jocelyne Loewen =

Canadian actress (born 1976)

- Born: Jocelyne Rae Loewen; 1976 (age 49–50); Alberta, Canada
- Other names: Jocelyn Leowen; Jocelyn Loewen
- Occupation: Actress
- Years active: 1997–present
- Notable credit(s): Vision of Escaflowne as Merle; Galaxy Angel as Milfeulle Sakuraba; Mobile Suit Gundam: Char's Counterattack as Quess Paraya; Littlest Pet Shop as Penny Ling
- Children: 1

Jocelyne Rae Loewen (born 1976) is a Canadian actress working in Vancouver, Canada. She is known for her roles in the English dubs of anime series. She is best known as the voice of Yai Ayano in the Mega Man NT Warrior series, Mii from Popotan, Milfuelle Sakuraba from the Galaxy Angel series, Merle from Escaflowne and Penny Ling from Littlest Pet Shop.

In addition to voice work, Jocelyne has also played part in several live-action movies and television shows, including Stargate SG-1, The 4400, The Dead Zone, and Eureka.

== Notable roles ==
Title	Role
Amelia's Moving Pictures	Leah
Being Ian	Tiffany
Black Lagoon	Gretel
Cardcaptors	Chelsea
Firehouse Tales	Additional Voices
Galaxy Angel	Milfeulle Sakuraba
Galaxy Angel A	Milfeulle Sakuraba
Galaxy Angel S	Milfeulle Sakuraba
Galaxy Angel X	Milfeulle Sakuraba
Galaxy Angel Z	Milfeulle Sakuraba
Girl vs. Monster	Mother
Gintama°	Kagura
Hamtaro	Penelope, Sparkle, June
Infinite Ryvius	Kozue Izumi
Inuyasha	Shunran (episode 75 -77), Mizuki (episode 130)
Littlest Pet Shop	Penny Ling/Stage Manager/Meow-Meow
MegaMan NT Warrior	Yai Ayano
Mobile Suit Gundam: Char's Counterattack	Quess Paraya
Mobile Suit Gundam SEED	Asagi Caldwell
Nurse Witch Komugi	Komugi Nakahara
Popotan	Mii
Ranma ½	Scribbled Panda, Satsuki Muyakoji, Mariko Konjo
Shakugan No Shana	Tiriel (Season 1)
The Chris Isaak Show	Lizzie (Episode 23 - Family Ties)
The SoulTaker	Komugi Nakahara
Stargate SG-1	Chloe (episode 7.09 - Avenger 2.0)
The Daichis - Earth's Defense Family	Junko Ejima
The Detectives (UK) (Special, 1997)	Maise
The SoulTaker	Komugi Nakahara
The Vision of Escaflowne / Escaflowne - The Movie	Merle (Bandai Entertainment dub)
ToddWorld	Shelly
Trouble Chocolate	Wheat
We're Lalaloopsy	Crumbs Sugar Cookie
