= List of Galaxy Angel characters =

This is a list of characters from the game, anime and manga involved in BROCCOLI's Galaxy Angel and its sequel Galaxy Angel II. Many of the character names are related to food, liquor, and desserts.

== Galaxy Angel ==
=== Moon Angel Troupe ===
==== Millefeuille Sakuraba (ミルフィーユ・桜葉, Mirufīyu Sakuraba) ====
Emblem Frame: GA-001 Lucky Star
Voice Actress: Ryoko Shintani
Voice Actress: Jocelyne Loewen

In the anime A 17-year-old, selfless pink-haired girl who has an incredible amount of good luck with extremely bad luck periodically to counter it. The bad luck can cause disastrous outcomes like destroying a whole planet or even an entire galaxy. Strangely enough, this could be minimized if Millefeuille is happy on those days. She is the newest member of the Angel Troupe at the start of the series. Her hobby is making tea and cooking snacks, particularly cake. The flowers on her head can spin and make her fly or hover in the air. Her first name is derived from the name for the French pastry mille-feuille.

In the games An original member of the Angel Troupe, Millefeuille is always caring and cheerful, and will never hesitate to help another person, even people who are considered by others as enemies. Possessing a supernatural level of good luck, to the point where strange things keep occurring around her, sometimes causing great annoyance to others, but always in some ways beneficial to herself. Even in normal situations, like tossing a coin, she will get all heads or all tails. By the definition given in the game, Millefeuille has the ability to fail all probability measures and cause one outcome to be 100%.

In the manga She is the main character of the manga. She first meets Takuto Meyers when she accidentally falls and got her skirt caught which left her hanging upside down; fortunately for her, Takuto was there to help her down. Millefeuille was the one who invited Takuto to join them in their mission and she is the first person in the manga who openly trusts Takuto. Near the end of the manga, when Takuto asked Millefeuille how she felt when she found out that he was the one piloting the Sharp Shooter, he leans in to kiss her before she could even continue answering Takuto's question for her. In the manga of Galaxy Angel II, Millefeuille is the current gate keeper and is married to Takuto.

==== Ranpha Franboise (蘭花・フランボワーズ, Ranfa Furanbowāzu) ====
Emblem Frame: GA-002 Kung-Fu Fighter
Voice Actress: Yukari Tamura
Voice Actress: Nicole Leroux, Tabitha St. Germain (S & X)

In the anime A blonde, vain beauty usually featured in a red Chinese dress with remarkable physical strength. Her hobby is fortune-telling, and she's even successful at times. Her predominant yet ultimately futile obsession is attempting to snag rich (and preferably handsome) men, which rarely appear in the series. Usually when she does meet these men she completely falls apart and makes a total fool of herself. Although apparently pushy she is actually very sensitive, though can come off as domineering. Her twin hair ornaments are weapons (although later in the series, they also serve other purposes as well). Ranpha's favorite food to eat and cook is spicy foods.

In the games Generally the same, though nowhere near as obsessed with men as she is in the anime. She became friends with Milfeulle in the military academy and considers her a rival, but is defeated on every occasion due to Milfeulle's luck. Proud and often harsh, some may find it difficult to approach Ranpha, let alone start a conversation with her. However, behind her tough exterior is a kind person who is always willing to put the feelings of others before herself.

In the manga A member of the Angel Troupe searching for "Mr. Right", her ideal boyfriend. At first, she didn't trust Takuto fully; she does not call him by his first name, she calls him a pervert, and she freely beats him up whenever he annoys her. Later on when she saw that Takuto genuinely cared for her, she started having a crush on him; this was lessened a bit however when he said that he likes everyone in the Angel Troupe, she then beats him up once again. Ranpha's crush on Takuto grew when he accidentally kissed her. It slightly damages her relationship with Milfeulle as she misinterprets their kiss, however she denies that it was a real kiss. Even though she loves Takuto, she is willing to give him up because from her point of view, it seems that Milfeulle and Takuto like each other; Ranpha even jokes to Milfeulle that she will take away Takuto if Milfeulle doesn't confess to him soon. In volume 3 of Galaxy Angel Beta, she casually tells Takuto "I like you" after returning from a trip. She then cheerfully announces that she is going on another trip and runs out of the room, leaving him stunned.

==== Mint Blancmanche (ミント・ブラマンシュ, Minto Buramanshu) ====
Emblem Frame: GA-003 Trick Master
Voice Actress: Miyuki Sawashiro
Voice Actress: Nicole Bouma

In the anime An intelligent blue-haired girl who loves to wear full body costumes, but will never, ever be seen by her friends while wearing them (unless it is work-related). Her family is wealthy and she sometimes comes off snobbish, but she normally has a sincere, distinguished politeness in her voice when in conversations with others. She has a dark side, as she can sometimes be selfish to the point of letting her fellow Angels die rather than be embarrassed, and she likes to play mean pranks on the less-than-bright Ranpha. She also can read minds or emotions in some situations. She has a pair of furry white rabbit ears, which rise or droop depending on her feelings. The ears also allow her to fly or hover in the air. Her last name is derived from the name for the dessert blancmange.

In the games Possessing telepathic abilities, Mint possesses the ability to read the thoughts of others, even if she doesn't want to. This led to her becoming reluctant to be with others outside the Angel Troupe. As in the anime, Mint comes from the Blancmanche family, a rich and powerful business family. The family is so powerful that, despite the rest of the Transbaal Empire being in chaos, it can still provide resources for Elsior. She also enjoys dressing up in costumes and to her horror is seen by Takuto while dressed as a giant hamster. She pilots the Emblem Frame "Trick Master", which is armed with "Fliers", remotely controlled weapons.

In the manga A member of the Angel Troupe with telepathic powers, which caused her to have a hard time trusting other people like Takuto. She loves cosplaying, tea, artificially flavored sweets. In one part of the manga, she goes on a solo mission to search for the fake Takuto roaming around the ship. When she finally finds it, she is overpowered by it, but thanks to Takuto, no harm was done. Mint then learns to trust Takuto when they have a little talk while stargazing with the other angels. Mint seems to have a small crush on Takuto after he saved her .

==== Forte Stollen (フォルテ・シュトーレン, Forute Shutōren) ====
Emblem Frame: GA-004 Happy Trigger
Voice Actress: Mayumi Yamaguchi
Voice Actress: Alison Matthews

In the anime A frank, husky-voiced, boyish redhead in a stylized military uniform complete with hat and monocle. Her hobby is collecting guns and other weapons, and is a strong believer in applied force to many situations. She is scared of and allergic to mice. She is a storied personality, with the most developed backstory of the Brigade, but despite her experience and high position, she is prone to get rich quick schemes.

In the games Similar to the anime, she is the leader of the Angel Troupe. Being the oldest, Forte acts as the big sister of the group, often giving advice to others. Like many of the other characters in the first game, Forte is less than impressed with the appointment of Takuto as the commander of the Elsior and bluntly tells him that she will not consider him her commander until he proves himself. He eventually does, and she begins to trust him as much as she would her Angel teammates.

In the manga She is the big sister of the Angel Troupe, often advising others and trying to help them with their problems. Forte also helps Takuto and gives him a little advice when it comes to "relationship problems". She is the one who has the least intimate relationship with Takuto in the manga, acting more as a big sister to him.

==== Vanilla H (ヴァニラ・H, Vanira Asshu) ====
Emblem Frame: GA-005 Harvester
Voice Actress: Mika Kanai
Voice Actress: Anna Cummer

In the anime A green-haired pale-colored young girl who rarely speaks, and always in a calm, deadpan voice. Most of the time, when she speaks, she refers to God or speaks in a riddle. She has a strange machine, known as the Nanomachine, in her room and often prays to it. Despite all of this, she is quite caring and always follows orders. She can heal the injuries of others, the effects made visible by a green glow around her hands, and the red gem at her forehead can sometimes project a powerful beam. She can also speak to various animals like when she talks to monkeys in episode 18. She carries around the stuffed animal in which Normad's chip has been placed, but she's not as devoted to Normad as he is to her and keeps him close only for personal benefit, such as using him as bait or as a cushion.

In the games Vanilla possess the ability to control nanomachines to perform various things, such as altering her appearance to healing wounds. However, she requires a great deal of mental control in order to control the nanomachines, and thus suppresses her emotions in order to utilize the nanomachines more efficiently. Despite seemingly acting without emotions, Vanilla is very caring, and often works herself helping others to the point of exhaustion. She is the pilot of the Emblem Frame "Harvester", which is a giant nanomachine colony and is used to repair/resupply the other Angel Frames during combat. Her pet cat that is always seen on her is actually constructed out of nanomachines, and expresses her emotions for her.

In the manga Vanilla behaves similarly in the manga as she does in the anime, the main difference being her nanobot. She doesn't carry Normad around in the manga for copyright reasons; instead, there is a small fox-like creature that sits on her shoulder. The creature, known only as "Nanobot", can transform into different clothing, assists her in some of her healing, and expresses her emotions for her. Vanilla does not like it when she does a task for others and fails it, but the others assure her that her help is greatly appreciated even if it won't turn out well. When Takuto made her smile. she took a small liking to him.

Probably one of the reasons why she takes death very hard is because she was present at the death of her adopted mother, Sister Beryl, and she regretted not being able to save her despite her ability to heal.

==== Chitose Karasumaru (烏丸 ちとせ, Karasuma Chitose) ====
Emblem Frame: GA-006 Sharp Shooter
Voice Actress: Saori Goto
Voice Actress: Tegan Moss

In the anime Introduced in the fourth season, Chitose is a purportedly sickly, navy blue-haired girl who joins the Twin Star team. Although she wishes to make friends, she is very clumsy about it. Her attitude towards the team (especially Milfeulle) flipflops between vengefulness and self-imagined ostracism. Some consider her an insecure love (friendship) addict albeit with good intentions.

In the games Introduced for the first time in Moonlit Lovers, Chitose became the replacement for one of the original Galaxy Angel members who left the team in order to be with Takuto. A traditional, polite, and soft-spoken young woman, Chitose joined the military for two reasons; for her respect and admiration for both her father and the Angel Troupe. Extremely intelligent, Chitose became an elite within the military, scoring the highest marks ever in the military exam, defeating even Milfeulle (who scored the second highest due to her luck).

In the manga She is the newest member of the Angel Troupe. She was found drifting in space in an escape capsule, she was the only survivor of a ship that was destroyed. Chitose also lost most of her memory when she comes out of the capsule. With the help of the angels and Takuto, she is able to slowly recover her memory. Because Takuto wants Chitose to help her regain her memory, she slowly starts to have a crush on him. The other Angels slowly become concerned of Chitose and Takuto's relationship, but Milfie assures them that it is no big deal because she wants Chitose's memory to return completely. However, in volume 2, it is revealed that Chitose has unwittingly been mind-controlled by Noa all along. Noa tries to make Chitose kidnap Prince Shiva, but Chitose regains enough of her own mind to kidnap Takuto instead.

=== Transbaal Empire ===
==== Takuto Meyers (タクト・マイヤーズ, Takuto Maiyāzu) ====
The newly appointed commander of the Elsior along with the Angel Troupe. He is widely known to be both a skirt chaser as well as a slacker. Seemingly completely carefree, Takuto may seem to be an incompetent captain, but when things get serious, his personality changes completely, becoming serious and devoted to the task ahead. He is close friends with his first officer Lester Cooldaras. He was introduced in the first Galaxy Angel game (entitled simply Galaxy Angel) that was released in 2003. He continued as the protagonist in the continuing games Galaxy Angel Moonlit Lovers (2004) and Galaxy Angel Eternal Lovers (2005). He appears in the sequel game Galaxy Angel II as commander and mentor to the new protagonist Kazuya Shiranami, and as such is expected to appear in following sequels. He is voiced by voice actor Yuji Ueda.

In the games Takuto first appeared and is most prominent in the Galaxy Angel trilogy of games (Galaxy Angel, Galaxy Angel Moonlit Lovers and Galaxy Angel Eternal Lovers). He was portrayed as a brilliant but untraditional soldier and at the beginning of the first game is in charge of a small patrol fleet of a mere three ships along with his best friend Lester Cooldaras. While many of the other characters questioned his being put in command of the Elle Ciel, his old teacher Luft insisted he was the best man for the job.

In his second appearance in Galaxy Angel Moonlit Lovers, he is a respected hero for his part in foiling the coup d'état of the exiled Prince Eonia. In the final game of the original trilogy, Galaxy Angel Eternal Lovers, he is referred to by other characters as 'the Hero of Transbaal' and 'the Legendary Hero', commanding entire fleets made up of hundreds, if not thousands of warships.

In Galaxy Angel II, his reputation has grown further still and the primary villain addresses him mock-respectfully as 'the Hero of EDEN' and 'the Legendary Hero' on various occasions.

In the manga Takuto was also the main character of the Galaxy Angel manga, based on the game trilogy. This incarnation of Takuto was more of a slacker and skirt-chaser than the one in the games. However, he still demonstrated the same tactical and strategic skill he had in his game appearances.

Takuto only exists in the manga and games.

==== Lester Cooldaras (レスター・クールダラス, Resutā Kūrudarasu) ====
The first officer of the Elsior, Lester spends most of his time either making sure that Takuto is doing his job as a commander, or trying to find Takuto as he goes off on one of his crazy adventures with the Angel Troupe. Has known Takuto since the military academy, and has been with him ever since. Unlike Takuto, whose skirt-chasing and slacker tendencies are somewhat exaggerated in the manga compared to the games, Lester's personality is left relatively untouched. However, he occasionally comes off as being more stressed out in the manga because of Takuto's personality. In the games, Takuto is somewhat more reasonable. Lester is voiced by Katsuyuki Konishi (小西克幸)

Lester is said to be the second-best of all of General Luft's students, after Takuto. He seems to excel at identifying enemy formations and ship classes, as well as day-to-day running of the ship. Paired with Takuto, whose talent lies in an uncanny ability to second-guess his opponents and take advantage of any weakness (be it in a formation or the ability of an enemy ship), the two are practically unstoppable. If he has any flaws, it is that he is somewhat conventional in terms of strategy, as opposed to Takuto's unorthodox methods. Takuto appreciates his friend's efforts in running the ship, which leaves him free to get to know the Angels and thus boost their abilities in battle. On the other hand, Lester is also the only person aboard the Elsior who can make Takuto sit down and do all the paperwork he's supposed to.

==== Almo Blueberrie (アルモ・ブルーベリー, Arumo Buruuberii) and Coco Nutmilk (ココ・ナッツミルク, Koko Nattsumiruku) ====
Bridge crew and operators of the Elsior. Like many other characters in the first game, they were dubious at best of Takuto Meyers' ability to lead. Almo in particular felt Lester would've made a far better commander (partly because she had a crush on him). Takuto eventually won them over and they accept his unorthodox leadership style. Almo has short purple hair, blue eyes and wears a small head dress, while Coco has long light brown hair, brown eyes and wears glasses. They accompanied General Luft and the Angels since the escape from Eonia's assault on the Transbaal throne world and were surprised to learn that the general was turning over control to the youthful Takuto Meyers. While initially impressed with Takuto for bluntly refusing to surrender to Rezum, one of Eonia's officers, they were dubious of Takuto's ability to lead because of his laid-back attitude. Such is their fondness that they were visibly saddened to learn he would likely have to surrender command of the Elsior to the supreme commander of the Eonia CounterAttack Fleet. Much later in Eternal Lovers, following a devastating loss to the Val Fasq, the two fear that Takuto will be severely disciplined for his failure.

Almo has a huge crush on Lester that is obvious to all but Lester himself, while Coco takes an interest in the assorted relationships occurring around her. Coco is also apparently a fan of Boys' Love, as evidenced by her glee whenever Takuto and Lester demonstrate some degree of closeness (such as finishing each other's sentences or guessing each other's thoughts).

==== Moon Goddess Shatoyan (月の聖母シャトヤーン, Tsuki no Seibo Shatoyān) ====
Revered by the people of Transbaal, and said to be the one whom brought peace and prosperity to the Transbaal Kingdom, Shatoyan resides within the White Moon itself. When Prince Eonia initiated his coup d'état, Shatoyan sealed both herself and the White Moon within an energy barrier, which is completely unbreakable by any known means. Shatoyan also sent both the Angel Troupe as well as the Elsior to ensure Prince Shiva's safety. Voiced by Kikuko Inoue (井上喜久子).

In the games Shatoyan first appears in Galaxy Angel, the first game in the trilogy, and plays a large part in the others. As the Holy Mother of the White Moon, she commands great respect and aids Tact and the Angel Troupe in their battles. While not a warrior, she is the one who reveals the powerful Chrono Break Cannon and has it attached to the Elle Ciel.

The White Moon also acts as the Angel Troupe's base of operations and is also where the Emblem Frames and the Elle Ciel were constructed. These facts, combined with the reverence she is shown by the people of the Transbaal Empire, make her one of the most powerful characters in the Galaxy Angel universe (most likely surpassing the authority of the Transbaal Imperial Family itself).

In the manga Shatoyan appears in the manga based on the Galaxy Angel games, but like many characters is in a much smaller role. Unlike the game, the White Moon is breached and she is taken prisoner by Eonia's forces. Her rescue is one of the Elle Ciel's top priorities.

==== Shiva Transbaal (シヴァ・トランスバール皇子, Shiva Toransubāru Ōji) ====
The only surviving member of the royal family of the Transbaal Kingdom, Prince Shiva is the target of assassination of Prince Eonia, and is under the constant protection of both the Angel Troupe and the Elsior. Raised on the White Moon, he is somewhat antisocial towards others and would rather remain secluded within his room on board the Elsior. He is also quite belligerent to Takuto at first, demanding that the Elsior head straight back to Transbaal and stop Eonia at once. This child possesses a heavy burden of being the last of the royal family, with knowledge that he must become king at such a young age, and refuses to be treated like the ten-year-old he is. It is later revealed that Shiva is a girl. Shiva is portrayed by Akemi Okamura (岡村明美).

==== Kuromie Quark (クロミエ・クワルク, Kuromie Kuwaruku) ====
Kuromie maintains the "Whale Room" on board the Elsior, and also is one of the few known people who can understand the mysterious Space Whales (宇宙クジラ). In the games, he helps Takuto sort out his feelings for his chosen Angel, and plays a fairly instrumental role in the start of their relationship. He is voiced by Mamiko Noto (能登麻美子).

While the English manga called him "Kuromie", an advertisement attached to the English anime called him "Chromier".

==== Creta Biscuit (クレータ, Kurēta Bisukyui) ====
Creta is the leader of the Elsior's maintenance teams, and a major fan of bishōnen idol "Ricky Kart". She is voiced by Sachiko Kojima (小島幸子).

==== Kela Hazel (ケーラ, Kēra Hebiru) ====
Kela is the Elsior's doctor, specializing in counselling. She has a major love of coffee. She is voiced by Sayaka Ohara (大原さやか)

==== Luft Weizen (ルフト・ヴァイツェン, Rufuto Vaitsen) ====
Luft is a general in the Transbaal Imperial Forces, as well as Takuto's old teacher. In the first game, he not only rescues Takuto, but gives him command of both the Elsior and Angel Troupe. He is voiced by Rokuro Naya (納谷六朗).

==== Gerard Transbaal (ジェラール・トランスバール, Gerard Toransubāru) ====
Transvaal 13 th Emperor. He is Shiva's father, he knew about Eonia's plans and because of that, he was killed by Eonia's forces.

==== Sigurd Sidmeyer (シグルト・ジーダマイア, Shiguruto Jidamaia) ====
He is military general whose work is to protect Gerard King's son, Prince Shiva. He is voiced by Daisuke Gōri (郷里大輔).

==== Noah Barden (ノア, Noa) ====
Noah is the administrative control system of the Black Moon, and for much of the first game she assists Eonia in his attempt to conquer the Transbaal Empire. She refers to Eonia as "onii-sama," one of many Japanese terms for an older brother. It is later discovered that Noah is the one manipulating Eonia from behind-the-scenes. However, in the second and third games of the trilogy, it is discovered that it was her automatic interface that was responsible for the events of the first game, and that the Black Moon and White Moon were both created to be defensive satellites for EDEN. As such, she becomes an ally in these games in the subsequent war against the true enemy of EDEN, Val-Fasq. She is voiced by Asuka Tani'i (谷井あすか).

The English manga refers to her as "Noa".

=== The Legitimate Transbaal Empire (Eonia's Rebel Forces) ===
==== Eonia Transbaal (エオニア・トランスバール, Eonia Toransubāru) ====
Eonia is the main adversary in the first game and manga series, as well as Shiva's older brother. Prior to the games, he committed the sin of patricide, murdering everyone in the Transbaal Royal Family except Prince Shiva. Allying himself with the Black Moon, he declared war against the Transbaal Empire. His goal is to capture the White Moon, and with it, Moon Goddess Shatoyan. The only thing standing in his way of this goal is the Elsior and its Angel Troupe. While Eonia is mostly a ruthless character, throughout the first game, he treats Noah with affection until Noah's true identity and intentions become clear. He is voiced by Shin-ichiro Miki (三木眞一郎).

==== Lulu (ルル, Ruru) ====
A character exclusive to the manga, Lulu considers herself a rival to Sherry, who simply brushes her aside as a subordinate. She wears glasses and is much more fragile than the brash, vengeful personality she displays. She kidnaps Milfeulle and Ranpha in order to exchange them for Shiva, but is foiled by Tact and dispelled from the rebellion.

==== Sherry Bristol (シェリー・ブリストル, Sherī Burisutoru) ====
Lady Sherry is one of Eonia's trusted subordinates. For most of the game and manga, she is responsible for the many opponents the Elsior faces in battle. In the latter half of the game, Sherry is killed after she deliberately crashes her warship into the Elsior in an attempt to take the protagonists down with her, but she is able to scream out Eonia's name before she dies. She is voiced by Yōko Sōmi (沢海陽子).

==== Camus O. Laphroaig (カミュ・O・ラフロイグ, Kamyu Ō Rafuroigu) ====
Camus is the narcissistic leader of a mercenary band of Emblem Frame pilots known as the "Hell Hounds" (ヘル・ハウンズ), who side with Eonia during the first game. The Hell Hounds are virtually male counterparts of the Angels (with the possible exception of Riserva). Where the Angels are named after desserts, the Hell Hounds have the names of various kinds of alcoholic drinks. He seems to hold a particular fondness for Milfeulle, often referring to her as "ma cherie" (and "my honey" in English words in the first video game), and sometimes mysteriously leaving her "Space Roses" in her bed. Once the Angel Troupe and Hell Hounds engage in their first dogfight, it is quite clear Milfie dislikes him. In the game, he speaks in a rather exaggerated, dramatic voice and, when forced to retreat, makes a show of it, flirting with Milfie and saying "Adieu!" However, in the manga, his personality is far more cold and mature. He is voiced by Akira Ishida (石田 彰).

==== Guinness Stout (ギネス・スタウト, Ginesu Sutauto) ====
A member of the Hell Hounds. He seems to hold some mysterious connection with Ranpha, and often refers to her as his eternal rival. She, however, is simply annoyed. Whenever they meet in battle, he goes well out of his way to attack her. He can never say anything calmly, instead yelling until the written dialogue box used as a subtitled companion to his speech trails off in small letters, and says "YEAAAAAAAAH!" in almost every sentence. He is voiced by Nobuyuki Hiyama (檜山修之).

==== Riserva Chianti (リセルヴァ・キアンティ, Riseruba Kianti) ====
A member of the Hell Hounds, she is considered to be their tactical expert. Coming from a highly prestigious family, she loathes Mint, and always singles her out in combat. In the English manga released by Broccoli Books, she is male, an easy mistake to make as she follows boystyle fashion and is the only female member. She is voiced by Yuu Asakawa (浅川 悠).

==== Red Eye (レッド・アイ, Reddo Ai) ====
A member of the Hell Hounds, he is considered to be the best marksman of the group. Because of their similarity in skill level, he considers Forte to be a big rival of his. He is voiced by Takahiro Sakurai (櫻井孝宏).

==== Vermouth Matin (ベルモット・マティン, Berumotto Matin) ====
A member of the Hell Hounds, he is the team's mechanic, and his Emblem Frame is similar in design to the Harvester, allowing him to repair his teammates' Emblem Frames in battle if needed. Like the others, he takes a rival, Vanilla H, who serves the same function as he does. He also built the Tact android that infiltrates the Elsior. Vermouth wears ridiculous spiral glasses that obscure his eyes, reminiscent of Gurio Umino from Sailor Moon and other such characters. He is voiced by Masahi Yabe (矢部雅史).

In the next-to-last chapter of the first game, after Eonia is defeated, Noah unexpectedly possesses the Hell Hounds by overriding their ships' controls and then stabbing them in the neck with yellow beaks. Although this also upgrades their ships, the now-brainwashed Hell Hounds are still subsequently defeated by the Angel Troupe, and this is their last appearance in the video game trilogy.

=== The True Legitimate Transbaal Empire ===
==== Lezom Mer Zom (レゾム・メア・ゾム, Rezomu Mea Zomu) ====
A high-ranking officer in Eonia's military force, he is the one who attacked Takuto's patrol fleet early in the first game. He is voiced by Naomi Kusumi (楠見尚己).

He reappears in Galaxy Angel Moonlit Lovers, having taken command of the remnant forces that once served under the now-deceased Eonia. His forces attack the protagonists multiple times, but to his shock, his first officer, Nephelia, later reveals herself to be a Val-Fasq, and then betrays him and causes his death. Before Lezom dies, he is at first angry at the betrayal, and then pleads, begs, and screams for his life. Nephelia takes no heed, and after a long, drawn-out whimper and a scream, Lezom is killed as his warship explodes.

==== Nephelia (ネフューリア, Nefyūria) ====
Formerly Lezom's first officer, she turns out to be the leader of a Val-Fasq starfleet that invades Transbaal territory in Moonlit Lovers. She pursued Takuto and the Elsior throughout most of the game. She is voiced by Kaho Kouda (幸田夏穂).

After Lezom is defeated for the last time partway through the game, Nephelia publicly reveals herself as a Val-Fasq, and she uses an overkill strategy by having a "hive"-like ship deploy legions of small ships at once so they can overwhelm the Elsior and the Angel Frames. Lezom is at first elated at his first officer's success, but Nephelia then proceeds to activate (from her ship) a self-destruct mechanism on Lezom's warship, which eventually leads to the latter's death (although Lezom still has time to express outrage and then beg for his life first before his ship explodes). Nephelia's strategy is thwarted only because the protagonists are able to activate the Elsior's Chrono Drive (a teleportation mechanism similar to the hyperdrive common in science fiction) and escape. Nephelia is shown to have a penchant for cruelty and apathy; at various points in the game, she laughs as she makes the protagonists suffer, and she is somewhat smug when explaining to Lezom her reasons for killing him. Nephelia's ship is surrounded by an almost-impenetrable shield, and Takuto's first attempt to destroy it with the Chrono Break Cannon proves fruitless. However, when Takuto and his chosen Angel, in the final battle of the game, are able to maneuver the Elsior close enough to Nephelia's ship, they deploy together aboard Angel Frame 7, utilize a device to cancel out the shield, and then successfully destroy Nephelia and her ship with the Chrono Break Cannon on Frame 7.

=== EDEN ===
==== Lushati (ルシャーティ, Rushāti) ====
Lushati is from the legendary planet EDEN. In the game Eternal Lovers, she comes to beg Takuto Meyers for his help in liberating EDEN from the Val-Fasq. She is polite and soft-spoken, but also rather naive at times. However, her arrival proves to be a major consternation for the Angel Takuto loves. She is voiced by Yuka Inokuchi (猪口有佳).

Lushati has actually been manipulated by her brother, Wein (who is actually a Val-Fasq, but disguised himself with human skin), for the first half of Eternal Lovers. Unfortunately for her, Takuto and his forces do not discover this until it is far too late: midway through the game, Lushati is brainwashed and abducted by Wein, taken aboard the stolen GA-007, and used as a power source to activate the GA-007's wings and bring the Chrono Break Cannon to full power. This causes Lushati to scream in agony, but Wein has taken away her ability to think independently and she can take no action to free herself, despite lacking any physical restraints to hold her in place. However, though Lushati remains brainwashed for a long time, eventually Wein begins to have second thoughts after being defeated in multiple battles despite his stolen Chrono Break Cannon. Late in the game, in a flashback as the bleeding and dying Wein has a discussion with Takuto and his romantic partner in a hospital bed, Wein temporarily brings Lushati out of her trance. Lushati does not appear to remember being brainwashed and her subsequent torment, so Wein tells Lushati the truth, explaining that he is a Val-Fasq. Lushati gasps in shock, but can say little else because Wein brainwashes her again, this time arranging for her security and high quality of life on the protagonists' side once she comes out of the trance, as he himself is fatally wounded by gunfire. After Wein dies, Lushati mulls over these events in the sick bay of the Elsior, and Takuto and his romantic partner discuss Wein with her. Although Wein treated Lushati as a tool before his change of heart, Lushati still mourns her brother's death, shouting his name several times and crying. Eventually, she calms down (partially as a result of Takuto and his romantic partner's reassurance and compassion), and is happier as a result in her newfound and genuine freedom.

==== Wein (ヴァイン, Vain) ====
A member of the EDEN delegation, and Lushati's little brother. During his stay aboard the Elle Ciel, his demeanor is quiet, calm, and reserved, yet genial. He is voiced by Norihisa Mori (森 訓久).

Midway through Eternal Lovers, soon after Takuto Meyers' romantic partner is injured to the point of hospitalization (due to Val-Fasq sabotage making it necessary for Takuto to shoot her down), Wein steals the GA-007 (along with the Chrono Break Cannon attached to it) and brainwashes and abducts his sister Lushati, taking her aboard the stolen craft. He then uses Lushati to power up the GA-007, and while this causes his sister agony to the point of screaming, Wein seems to show little concern. After a while, his reasons become clear: he is actually a Val-Fasq himself (characterized by abnormally white skin and numerous red markings all over his body, all of which he disguised with normal-looking skin while aboard the Elsior so that he could fool those who thought of him only as a victim of Val-Fasq atrocities), although Lushati appears innocent of wrongdoing. While he is detached and even smug in this encounter, he gradually becomes bitter and angry as the game progresses and he is defeated in multiple battles. Towards the end of Eternal Lovers, Wein is fatally wounded by gunfire, and lays bleeding to death in a hospital bed. Takuto and his romantic partner visit Wein's bedside, at which point Wein sounds remorseful. Wein explains that he is no longer exerting negative influence upon Lushati and also explains the events that led up to his change of heart. After further discussion with both Takuto and his romantic partner, Wein passes away.

=== Val Fasq ===
==== Gern (ゲルン, Gerun) ====
Great leader of Val Fasq. He is more than 600 years and continues to reign as Emperor. He is voiced by Rokuro Naya (納谷六朗).

==== Rowil (ロウィル, Rouiru) ====
Commander in chief of the Val-Fasq's Transbaal Invasion Fleet, and considered "the number two man" in the Val-Fasq military behind Gern, according to Wein. He is polite but extremely cold and brusque, considering humanity a lesser race and thus not worthy of much in the way of communication or tactics. He is voiced by Makoto Yasumura (保村真).

=== Anime exclusive ===
==== Commander Volcott O'Huey (ウォルコット・O・ヒューイ, Worukotto Ō Hyūi) / Valdmir Volcott ====
Boss and occasional father figure to the Angel Team. He is close to retiring and has variable patience with the girls. Volcott will occasionally worry about how a given situation with them might jeopardize his retirement benefits. According to one episode in the first season, when he is flustered or panicked, he starts vacuuming things. Voiced by Keiji Fujiwara (藤原啓治) in the original version and Michael Kopsa in the English dub.

During a costumed diving competition in the English dub, he is referred to by the name "Vladmir Volcott".

==== Normad/Nomad (ノーマッド, Nōmaddo) ====
An AI recovered from a missile that was floating in space. He never completed his mission because he didn't want to die, which is what would have happened if his warhead detonated. He is later placed into a stuffed animal vaguely resembling a round, pink cat/penguin. Normad usually has endless praise for Vanilla (despite her on-and-off nonchalant abandonment and abuse towards him) but has cynical views toward the rest of the Angel Team, especially Milfeulle, whom he calls a dimwit, and Forte, who returns the favor and routinely shoots him. Aside from occasional descriptive information he supplies, he mainly provides comic relief due to his inability to avoid injury. His name was likely inspired by the Star Trek episode The Changeling, which featured a sentient AI weapon, that also had the name Nomad, and talked in a high pitched voice. Normad's voice is performed by Mika Kanai (Vanilla). As for the English dub, he is portrayed by Richard Ian Cox. In the first manga, Normad's body can be seen in chapter 2.

==== Major Mary (メアリー少佐, Mearī Shōsa) ====
Family name unknown. The creator of Team Twin Star and the Perot brothers' superior officer, she sees Volcott and the Angel Team as rivals. She displays a cunning personality, even resorting to sabotage in one special episode to allow her 'Twin Star Team' to prevail. Voiced by Sayaka Ohara (大原さやか) and by Sylvia Zaradic in the English dub.

=== Drama CD and anime exclusive (Perot Brothers) ===
==== Cocomo Perot (ココモ・ペイロー, Kokomo Peirō) and Malibu Perot (マリブ・ペイロー, Maribu Peirō) ====
Two young boys (brothers) who make occasional appearances in the third and later seasons. Called the Twin Star Team, they work under a female commander, Major Mary, much in the same way as the Angel Team, but seem more capable. They coincidentally resemble the young boys in another Broccoli production, Di Gi Charat (the characters of which make a few very brief cameos). Polar opposites, Cocomo is hotheaded, immature and obsesses over parfait, whilst Malibu is reserved, thoughtful and enjoys reading. Yuko Sanpei (三瓶由布子) does Cocomo while Tomo Saeki (サエキトモ) does Malibu. In the English dub, Reece Thompson and Danny McKinnon voice the boys, respectively.

== Galaxy Angel II ==
In the sequel Galaxy Angel II, many characters from the first trilogy appear.

=== Rune Angel Troupe ===
==== Kazuya Shiranami (カズヤ・シラナミ) ====
Emblem Frame: RA-000 Brave Heart
Voice Actor: Hisafumi Oda (小田久史)

Kazuya Shiranami is the leader of the Rune Angel Troupe, appointed by Tact Mayers himself, though he was selected to join the Angel Troupe by Milfeulle Sakuraba using her impossible luck. He has a rather docile, sometimes meek personality and is easily embarrassed. He formerly attended a cooking school with Lunti, the Luxiole's cook. He specialized in desserts, graduating top of his class in that category. As such, he is always stuck making the desserts for parties, whether he likes it or not. In battle, he pilots the new (pseudo-)Emblem Frame "Brave Heart", which has the ability to combine with any of the girls' Emblem Frames. During the strategy segments of the game, if the combined Emblem Frame or the Luxiole is defeated or Time up, the game is over.

==== Apricot Sakuraba (アプリコット・桜葉, Apurikotto Sakuraba) ====
Emblem Frame: RA-001 Cross Caliber
Voice Actor: Yuna Inamura (稲村優奈)

Apricot Sakuraba, or Rico for short, is a first member of the Rune Angel Troupe. She also happens to be the 14-year-old younger sister of Moon Angel Troupe ace pilot Millefeuille Sakuraba, whom she loves dearly, and tries as much as possible to be just like her. Apricot, unlike her older sister, is not as good of a cook as her sister but is a fan of sweets. He instead is a lot more book-smart and helps around the ship's facilities in taking stock of supplies and managing logistics. While not particularly athletic, Apricot is known for having a superhuman amount of strength, though this only shows itself subconsciously. Despite harboring a crush on her team leader, she is terrified of boys, and will unintentionally lash out with her full strength should a boy so much as touch her shoulder. Tact seems to be the one who makes the mistake of doing that most often (this being her running gag).

Her personal color is orange. In battle, she pilots the new Emblem Frame "Cross Caliber", a very small, light Frame that can mode change to attack; its special attack is Hyper Blaster.

==== Lily C. Sherbet (リリィ・C・シャーベット, Riri Shī Shābetto) ====
Emblem Frame: RA-002 Eagle Gazer
Voice Actor: Erina Nakayama (中山恵里奈)

Lily Caramel Sherbet was the original leader of the Rune Angel Troupe, sporting dark blue hair. She is from a clan of female warriors and was the former leader of the Rune Angel Troupe, but she left on a mission and did not return until the present. At first glance, she appears to be dressed like a young knight. Not surprisingly, she is also quite a skilled swordswoman, and is rarely, if ever, seen without a rapier in hand. Despite this outward appearance, she has quite a diligent personality, sometimes lending money to the other Angels. She is currently working under Forte Stollen and Chitose Karasuma in the Imperial Training academy. In many ways, she is the counterpart to the Moon Angel Troupe's Forte Stollen, with whom she shares a teacher-student relationship. She is known for her tendency to express approval with "OK-da" and disapproval with "NG-da" (NG standing for No Good). Her running gag has her unexpectedly bursting into tears.

Her personal color is dark blue. In battle, she pilots the new Emblem Frame "Eagle Gazer", a slow sniper that attacks with Extreme Lancer.

==== Nano-Nano Pudding (ナノナノ・プディング, Nanonano Pudingu) ====
Emblem Frame: RA-003 First Aider
Voice Actor: Satomi Akesaka (明坂聡美)

Nano-Nano Pudding is a third member of the Rune Angel Troupe, sporting light blue hair, as well as a long white tail, and rather narrow pupils. At first glance, she appears to be a catgirl, which is not entirely that inaccurate, given her playful, kitten-like personality. Like her name suggests, she is in fact a living piece of lost technology and a Nano-machine generator, giving her the ability to interact with them in much the same way as Vanilla H, who she refers to as "Mama" because it was Vanilla who first discovered her on the Planet Pico. She also has the ability to heal like Vanilla, and it seems that her white tail has the strongest source of nano-machines. During her chapter in the game, she also displays the ability to copy another's appearance at will (though she highly resents it). She tends to end her sentences with "nano da". She looks up to Anise as a 'Master' or 'Big Sister' seeing how Anise saved Nano-Nano from falling while stealing the Brave Heart.

Her personal color is sky blue. In battle, she pilots the new Emblem Frame "First Aider", which is also the only Emblem Frame to have TWO special attacks, which can be switched at any time. Repair Wave, a healing special similar to the Harvester's (Vanilla's Frame) "Repair Wave", and an offensive special, Needle Flechette.

==== Kahlua/Tequila Marjoram (カルーア/テキーラ・マジョラム, Karūa/Tekīra Majoramu) ====
Emblem Frame: RA-004 Spell Caster
Voice Actor: Aya Hirano (平野 綾)

Kahlua Majoram is a fourth member of the Rune Angel Troupe, sporting blonde hair. She has a very quiet, gentle personality, speaking in a slow, rather laid-back tone. She is from the Majoram Bloodline, which is a family known for their very powerful sorcery. She is a very powerful sorceress, though she is unable to use much of her power except during times of emotional distress. She also holds Ranpha Franboise in very high regard. She sometimes transforms into "Tequila Marjoram", a bright purple-haired girl. Along with a distinct change in personality after the transformation (for example, she is more aggressive and hot-tempered), Tequila is capable of using the full potential of her magic power. Another noticeable difference between them is Tequila's bust size. The transformation is triggered by Kahlua being exposed to alcohol, though the transformation can also be controlled by the consumption of a medication Kahlua invented. A running gag has Kahlua accidentally ingesting alcohol, bringing a less-than-amused Tequila into the scene.

Her personal color is light green. In battle, she (as Tequila) pilots the new Emblem Frame "Spell Caster", which has high defense and an attack called Hexa Cross-Break.

==== Anise Azeat (アニス・アジート, Anisu Ajīto) ====
Emblem Frame: RA-005 Relic Raider
Voice Actor: Satomi Hanamura (花村怜美)

A sixth (fifth in GA rune) member of the Rune Angel Troupe, Anise Azeat is a red-haired girl with blue eyes. She has a very outgoing, active, and competitive personality. She also uses a rather rough (for a girl) talking style, including the use of the male pronoun "ore". While originally from a clan of gypsy pirates and a treasure hunter hired to steal the Brave Heart (Which Nano-Nano tries to stop her from stealing it, she slips and started falling but Anise grabs her hand and saved Nano-Nano. Since then Nano-Nano starts calling her master or big sister) she eventually joins the Angel Troupe, in no small part due to the assistance of Mint Blancmanche. She also looks up to Ranpha Franboise, referring to her as "Nee-san" (literally "Big sister"). Her running gag is a tendency to mispronounce words, especially names. To Mint's displeasure, Anise once referred to her as "Mint Butamanju" (literally "Mint Porkbun"). She has also been seen to touch Kazuya in familiar ways, such as punching him in the arm, resulting in him calling her 'tomboy', and running away. (Sometimes, even crying.)

Her personal color is wine red. In battle, she pilots the new Emblem Frame "Relic Raider", a very mobile ship that attacks with Genocide Bomber.

==== Natsume Izayoi (ナツメ・イザヨイ, Natsume Izayoi) ====
Emblem Frame: RA-006 Papillon Chaser
Voice Actor: Atsuko Enomoto (榎本温子)

A sixth female member of the Rune Angel Troupe, Natsume Izayoi is a pearl pink-haired girl with amber eyes. She appears as the head of the Arms Alliance but after seeing the various wrongs committed by the "Three Marquis", as well as the fact that they abandoned her, she comes to realize that the Seldor Alliance is not evil. She is a very young girl who'll always fight for justice even though she may be a little selfish and naive. She also has a great education, similar to Chitose Karasuma. Because she was being manipulated by the Three Marquises, she was unwilling to become an ally to the Luxiole's crew, so Kazuya is tasked to interact with her. Natsume grows to accept the Rune Angel Wing as the true force of justice in the conflict when the rest of the Arms Alliance abandons her. While she is not made a proper member of the Angel Wing until the third game, she joins them in combat in the latter half of the Arms Alliance conflict.

Her personal color is pearl pink. In battle, she pilots the new Emblem Frame "Papillon Chaser", a heavy assault fighter that attacks with Zephyrus Rampage.

==== Roselle Mateus (ロゼル・マティウス, Rozeru Matiusu) ====
Emblem Frame: Holy Blood
Voice Actor: Takashi Kondō (近藤隆)

The second male member of the "Rune Angel Troup". He is a very kind and competitive young man who earned the highest rank both in academics and piloting during his training. He was selected by Noa to pilot her newly designed mass-produced Emblem Frame prototype, the Holy Blood and was given a position to reinforce the Rune Angel Wing after they reassigned to the United Parallel Worlds. Roselle's dedication to piloting stems from the wishes of his late sister who wanted to see the stars. This dedication however stifled his social skills as he spends more time training than socializing. Depending on the route, Roselle becomes Kazuya's romantic rival or supporter of the latter's relationship, learning to finally open up and become more than just teammates to his team.

Due to his superb piloting skills, he is selected to pilot the prototype mass-production Emblem Frame, "Holy Blood" which attacks with Photon Diver.

=== Luxiole Crew ===
==== Tapio Ca (タピオ・カー, Tapio Kaa) ====
Deputy commander and chief operator for the Luxiole. When Tact is promoted to become Chief of the United Parallel Worlds, Tapio is sent to become the ship's new chief operator as Coco is promoted to become its new commander. He is of Val-Fasq origin and has their signature ability to control mechanical devices such as ships with their minds. He is voiced by Susumu Chiba (千葉進歩).

==== Hibiki Takuma (ヒビキ・タクマ, Hibiki Takuma) ====
He is part of the operator staff in the Luxiole. He has red hair and is in charge of communication. His rank is a second lieutenant. His first appearance was on Mugen Kairo no Kagi. He is voiced by Yuuichi Nakamura (中村 悠一).

==== Juri Melanzana (シュリ・メランザーナ, Shuri Meranzaana) ====
She is part of the operator staff of the Luxiole. She has pink hair and she is the helms-woman of the ship. Her rank is a second lieutenant. Her debut is on Mugen Kairo no Kagi. She is voiced by Yukiko Monden (門田幸子).

==== Brenda Glucini (ブレンダ・グリシーニ, Burenda Gurishiini) ====
She appears on Eigo Kaiki no Koku only. She is transferred from the EDEN military to the UPW and was assigned to the Luxiole as the new shuttle pilot by EDEN. Her rank is a second lieutenant. She is voiced by Yuuko Shima (島ゆうこ).

==== Mimolette (ミモレット, Mimoretto) ====
Kahlua's familiar who has been by her side for most of her life. Mimolette is an unidentified species of creature who resembles a sphere but with the features of a cat. It is voiced by Akiko Kobayashi (小林晃子).

==== Lunti Fiadone (ランティ, Ranti Fuiadoune) ====
Head Chef of the Luxiole. He is Kazuya's friend since their days of culinary school. While Lunti is a gourmet chef who specializes in a multitude of disciplines, he admits that Kazuya has the upper hand in baking. He is immensely jealous of Kazuya's position to interact with the Angels daily. He is voiced by Hiroyuki Yoshino (吉野裕行).

==== Melba Brownie (メルバ・ブラウニー, Meruba Buraunī) ====
Tea lounge waitress. She runs the Tea Lounge, a popular relaxation spot on the ship. While she dresses as a maid, she is highly trained in her duties as she boasts having never broken any dish or cup. Despite her bubbly attitude, she carries a P90 on her in case of emergencies. She is voiced by Kana Asumi (阿澄佳奈).

==== Mordent Bagel (モルデン, Moruden Bageru) ====
The Luxiole's doctor in the medical bay. He is frequently assisted by Nano Nano like Vanilla used to do with Dr. Kela. He is trained as the ship's sole physician, dentist, and even mental counselor who hears out the Angel Wing's problems if they're usually too distressed to consult each other. He is voiced by Kunihiko Yasui (安井邦彦).

==== Croix Blort (クロワ, Kurowa Burouto) and Coronet Choucroute (コロネ・シュークルート, Korone Shūkurūto) ====
The Luxiole chief engineer. He is the maintenance foreman who, while demanding and a bit of a perfectionist, has a good heart. This coincides with Coronet, the younger but immensely talented female member of the engineer team who is more hasty and often makes mistakes. They are voiced by Ken Uo (魚健) and Mami Kameoka (亀岡真美) respectively.

==== Maria Steline (マリア・ステリーネ, Maria Suterīne) ====
Luxiole engineer who solely occupies the engine room. She is a surly and taciturn girl but she is the best in her work and sometimes acts like a little girl when around the devices she maintains; she also is acquainted with Lily's family. She is voiced by Kanako Kondō (近藤 佳奈子).

==== Luco Frite (ルコ・フリット, Ruko Furitto) ====
A salesclerk at convenience store Junks in the Luxiole. He is Eco's younger brother. He has a dull way of talking like his older brother, but when he is in front of Eco, he complains to his older brother and acts different. He is also responsible for maintaining the ship's recreation room that is often vandalized by Anise. He is voiced by Makoto Yasumura (保村真).

=== Seldor ===
==== Soldum Seldor (ソルダム・セルダール, Sorudamu Serudaaru) ====
King of the Royal Dinastia. As King Seldor can not have a direct conversation with anyone and that is why he is always accompanied by his two fairies Kelsey and Santa Rosa. He does not speak until Mugen Kairo no Kagi to inspire his troops into battle. He is voiced by Tomokazu Sugita (杉田智和).

==== Deriana Maccaral (デリアナ・マッカラル, Deriana Makkararu) ====
She is voiced by Kikuko Inoue (井上喜久子).

==== Menorca Sardine (メノルカ・サーディン, Menoruka Saadin) ====
She is voiced by Mamiko Noto (能登麻美子).

==== Ayla Caramel (アイラ・カラメル, Aira Karameru) ====
She is voiced by Yukari Fukui (福井裕佳梨).

==== Rodiak Kiandeer (ロディアック・キャンディラ, Rodiakku Kyandira) ====
Third son from Kiandeer's family and third assistant of vice minister for home affairs, He uses a strategy to marry Lily C. Sherbet, because to him, being in the Angel-Troup is not enough. He is voiced by Makoto Yasumura (保村真).

==== Kelsie (ケルシー, Kerusii) and Santa Rosa (サンタローザ, Santarooza) ====
They are the two fairies who are accompanying Soldum. It is said that the fairies have a kind of spiritual bond with his telepathy, so they are the voice for people of non-family. They have an important role in his life. They are voiced by Yuka Iguchi (井口裕香) and Shion Hirota (廣田詩夢) respectively.

==== Hercot (ハーコット, Haakotto) ====
She is voiced by Sayuri Yahagi (矢作紗友里).

=== Magic ===
==== Caraway (キャラウェイ, Kyarawei) ====
Grand Master of Magic from Magic planet. She was Kahlua's (Tequila) teacher although she was always enraged because of the cowardice of Kahlua Marjoram, Tequila made jokes for her revenge. She is voiced by Nao Nagasawa (永澤菜教).

=== Azeat ===
==== Grog Metabuha (グロッグ・メタブーハ, Guroggu Metabuuha) ====
Pirate Captain belonging from the family of hunters which Anise Azeat came too. Despite his appearance, he is a friendly guy who helps Anise to whatever she needs. He is voiced by Hiroki Yasumoto (安元洋貴).

==== Masara Azeat (マサラ・アジート, Masara Ajiito) ====
She is voiced by Hiromi Sato (佐藤ひろ美).

==== Garam Azeat (ガラム・アジート, Garamu Ajiito) ====
He is voiced by Hiroki Shimowada (下和田裕貴).

==== Kelvin Crepe (ケルビン・グレープ, Kerubin Gureepu) ====
He is voiced by Chō (チョー).

==== Stanley (スタンレイ, Sutanrei) ====
He is voiced by Tomokazu Sugita (杉田智和).

=== Arms Alliance ===
==== Yuzu Izayoi (ユズ・イザヨイ, Yuzu Izayoi) ====
She is voiced by Saki Fujita (藤田咲).

==== Hamon Zerbec (ハモン・ゼルベック, Hamon Zerubekku) ====
He is voiced by Masahito Yabe (矢部雅史).

=== Verel's Coup d'etat ===
==== Dieta (ディータ, Diita) ====
Sorceress specializes in curses and hypnotic suggestions. She appears in early, as an important figure in the military coup and uses Anise (before she enjoys to the Angel-Rune team) to steal and destroy the Luxiole starting with the Brave Heart. She comes from Magic planet where she met Kahlua to become a witch, she wouldn't accept that Kahlua had a better grade than her so she took Kahlua as her rival. In the end of the chapter, Tequila stops Dieta's plan to destroy the planet Magic which failed and Dieta dies. She is voiced by Atsuko Enomoto (榎本温子).

==== Verel (ヴェレル, Vereru) ====
The last survivor of his race that used to habit the ABSOLUTE. He wakes up to open the door of ABSOLUTE and takes revenge against Seldor, but to do this he needs to find the gatekeeper who would be Milfeulle, once the door is opened he uses the power of Shadow Moon and destroy whoever tries to stop his plans to take the control over the universe. He has Dieta's help at the first time but because her fails, he has a battle against the Angel-Moon team and the Angel-Rune team, and thanks to the unity of the two teams they defeated Verel's powerful ship. He is voiced by Mugihito (麦人).

=== Three Marquis ===
==== Genievres Hatchet (ジュニエヴル・ハチェット, Junievuru Hachetto) ====
The head regent of the planet Hatchet and one of the Three Marquis. He lies Natsume to start a war against Seldor however when Natsume knew about his real plan, he took her as a prisoner however the Angel-Rune rescue her to join them. He is voiced by Kenji Nojima (野島健児).

==== Calvados Cudgel (カルバドゥス・カジェル, Karubados Kajeru) ====
The head shogun of the planet Cudgel and one of the Three Marquis. He is impulsive and not patient, he tries to defeat the Luxiole with help from the other two marquis. He is voiced by Takanori Hoshino (星野貴紀).

==== Benedictine Pike (ベネディクタイン・パイク, Benedikutain Paiku) ====
The head marquis of the planet Pike and one of the Three Marquis. He is a very cautious person, he attacks his enemies with very much precautions maybe because he is unable to cope with unexpected situations. He is voiced by Takashi Matsuyama (松山鷹志).

=== Will ===
==== Parfait (パルフェ, Parufe) ====
He is a member of the organization Will, and first appears as a glowing messenger with wings when he pulled the White Moon into the Infinite Corridor as a demonstration of their powers as well as that of the Infinite Corridor. He then appears in front of the Luxiole crew when they entered the Infinite Corridor as a hologram, and informs them that he is the arbiter of Will, and that they have passed their tests up to that point magnificently. He then administers two more tests unto the crew of the Luxiole. When the Luxiole pass them both, he personally appears, interfaced with his ship, the Astral Parfait. He then offers to them the technology possessed by Will, under the condition that they would help spread their culture. Unfortunately, in the spreading of this culture, all other cultures would be wiped out and replaced with theirs. As such, the crew declines to cooperate, leading to Parfait classifying them as irregulars, and attempting to eliminate them. He is defeated when Roselle Mateus crosses Holy Blood into his ship using Photon Diver, and then proceeds to release the Chrono Strings, causing a huge explosion that disintegrates both Roselle and Parfait. He is voiced by Masato Amada/Michael Shitanda (天田 真人/四反田マイケル).

==== Sorbet (ソルベ, Sorube) ====
The second member of Will to appear. He is identical in appearance to Parfait as seen when Tapio and Noa mistook him for Parfait before he introduced himself. Cool and collected, Sorbet has his own personal ship, the Astral Sorbet, and is capable of engulfing a planet with a five-diameter black hole. His Astral Sorbet is destroyed by the Luxiole's "Dual Chrono Break Cannon Unlimited", killing Sorbet as a result. He is voiced by Michael Shitanda (四反田マイケル).

==== Serena (セレナ, Serena) ====
One of the two leaders of Will. Serena is a white-haired female deity with a silver wing on her right shoulder who desires to become a Goddess along with Herea. She, along with Herea, uses the Hallelujah Will as their flagship. She is voiced by Ami Koshimizu (小清水亜美).

==== Herea (へレア, Herea) ====
One of the two leaders of Will. Herea is a red-haired male deity with a gold wing on his left shoulder who desires to become a God along with Serena. He, along with Serena, uses the Hallelujah Will as their flagship. He is voiced by Yū Kobayashi (小林ゆう).

=== Others ===
==== Bianca Mateus (ビアンカ・マティウス, Bianka Matiusu) ====
Roselle's little sister. Since pretty young, She was very fragile because of illness. When Roselle was chosen for pilot testing, Bianca unfortunately pass away. She is voiced by Sayuri Yahagi (矢作紗友里).

==== Coockie (クッキー, Kukkii) ====
She is voiced by Satomi Kōrogi (こおろぎさとみ).

==== Bell Orchietette (ペル・オルキエテッテ, Peru Orukietette) ====
He is voiced by Hiroki Shimowada (下和田裕貴).

==== Rivera Kuruzan (リベラ・クルーザン, Ribera Kuruuzan) ====
He is voiced by Sachiko Kojima (小島幸子).

==== Rondo Pasutiyaju (ロンド・パスティヤージュ, Rondo Pasutiyaaju) ====
She is voiced by Sayaka Ohara (大原さやか).

==== Bake Kuramu (クラム・ベイク, Kuramu Beiku) ====
He is voiced by Kenji Nojima (野島健児).

==== Mimoza Fleur (ミモザ・フルール, Mimosa Flour) ====
An exclusive manga character who appears in the fourth edition. After the battle against Dita, the Angel-Troup recovered an unidentify body. Then she says she's from the past. She and Kazuya travel to Planet Cocoon and learn about a special project called "Brave Heart." Kazuya is suspicious and wonders what this project is all about — and how it involves him.

=== Galaxy Angel Rune ===
==== Kuuhen Bahm (クーヘン・バーム, Kuuhen Baamu) ====
Officer and housewife of the Rune Angel-tai house. He is a man dressed as a woman who cares much for his appearance and that is why he always has too much makeup. He is also the owner of a bar in which he always tries to seduce some male customers. He is voiced by Katsuyuki Konishi (小西 克幸).

==== Isabella Essence (イザベラ・エッセンス, Izabera Essensu) ====
Army Commander Transbaal in the city. She always is behind a monitor to give orders to the Rune Angel-tai in the space station, even when she is a bit irresponsible as a commander. She is voiced by Yuki Matsuoka (松岡 由貴).

==== Dorten Baine (ドルテン・バイン, Doruten Bain) ====
He is Mayor of Transbaal's city, who sometimes calls on the Rune Angel-tai for assistance. He always is covered by a polygon figure and frequently gets frozen. He is voiced by Chō (チョー) (also known as Yūichi Nagashima (長島 雄一)).
