= Yūna Inamura =

Japanese voice actress (born 1982)

- 稲村 優奈
- Born: July 11, 1982 (age 44); Kagoshima Prefecture, Japan
- Occupation: Voice actress
- Agent: Asai Production

Yūna Inamura (稲村 優奈, Inamura Yūna; born July 11, 1982) is a Japanese voice actress who is affiliated with AT Production. She was born in Kagoshima Prefecture and grew up in Nakano, Tokyo.

== Filmography ==
- 2005: Jinki:EXTEND as Akao Hiiragi/Akana Oike
- 2005: Happy Seven as Amano Sakogami
- 2005–2006: SoltyRei as Illumina Kisch
- 2006: Galaxy Angel II: Zettai Ryōiki no Tobira (Galaxy Angel II series) as Apricot Sakuraba
- 2006: Galaxy Angel Rune (Galaxy Angel II series) as Apricot Sakuraba
- 2006: True Tears (game) as Yuzuko Sanada
- 2006–2010: Reborn! as Kyoko Sasagawa
- 2007: Darker than Black as Mayu Ōtsuka
- 2007: Galaxy Angel II: Mugen Kairō no Kagi (Galaxy Angel II series) as Apricot Sakuraba
- 2008: Mission-E as Maori Kimizuka
- 2009: Galaxy Angel II: Eigō Kaiki no Toki (Galaxy Angel II series) as Apricot Sakuraba
- 2010: Shin Koihime Musō: Otome Tairan as Gotsutotsukotsu
- 2010: Z.H.P. Unlosing Ranger VS Darkdeath Evilman (game) as Etranger/Super Baby
- 2011: Moe Moe Daisensou Gengaiban + (game) as Blanche
- 2014: Yu-Gi-Oh! Arc-V as Yuzu Hiiragi, Serena
- 2015: Yu-Gi-Oh! Arc-V Tag Force Special (Yu-Gi-Oh! Arc-V) Yuzu Hiiragi (game)
- 2017: Azur Lane (game) as HMS Hermes
