= Erina Nakayama =

Erina Nakayama may refer to:

- Erina Nakayama (actress, born 1987), Japanese voice actress
- Erina Nakayama (actress, born 1995), Japanese actress and model
