= Mayumi Yamaguchi =

Japanese voice actress (born 1975)

- Born: May 12, 1975 (age 49); Iwate Prefecture, Japan
- Occupation: Voice actress
- Notable credits: Galaxy Angel as Forte Stollen; Fullmetal Alchemist as Envy; Digimon series as Gabumon; Digimon Tamers as Jenrya Lee

Mayumi Yamaguchi (山口 眞弓, Yamaguchi Mayumi, born May 12, 1975) is a Japanese voice actress who is affiliated with Accent.

== Voice roles ==
=== Television animation ===
- Bleach (Aaroniero Arruruerie - high-pitched head)
- The Law of Ueki (Tarō Myōjin)
- Ojamajo Doremi series (Hasebe, Leon)
- Fighting Beauty Wulong (Yunbo Naniwa)
- Gad Guard (Linda)
- Galaxy Angel (Forte Stollen)
- Zatch Bell! (Bamū)
- Shijou Saikyou no Deshi Kenichi (Taichi Koga)
- Digital Monster X-Evolution (MetalGarurumon X)
- Digimon Adventure series (Gabumon) (voice-acting debut)
- Digimon Tamers (Henry Wong)
- Duel Masters (Fōsu)
- Naruto (Orochimaru (young))
- Fullmetal Alchemist (Envy, others)
- Trinity Blood (Paula)
- Black Cat (Shiki)
- Pokémon Advanced Generation (Clefairy, villager)
- PoPoLoCrois (Bomu)
- Paranoia Agent (Taira Yūichi)
- Lovely Idol (Maki Yōko)
- Rockman EXE (Dingo)
- Samurai Champloo (Kawara Sousuke)
- Tamagotchi! (Kikitchi)

=== Theatrical animation ===
- Fullmetal Alchemist the Movie: Conqueror of Shamballa (2005) (Envy)
- Digimon Adventure tri. (2015) (Gabumon)
- Digimon Adventure: Last Evolution Kizuna (2020) (Gabumon)

=== Video games ===
- Fullmetal Alchemist 2: Curse of the Crimson Elixir (Envy)
- Fullmetal Alchemist: Dream Carnival (Envy)
- Galaxy Angel series (Forte Stollen)
- Galaxy Angel II series (Forte Stollen)
- Digimon games: (Gabumon)
- Super Smash Bros. series: (Pokémon Trainer (Male))
- Live A Hero (Crowne Applefield)

=== Dubbing roles ===
- Justice League (Morgaine le Fey)
- 24 (Jenny Dodge)
- Totally Spies! (Alex & Carmen)
- The Tudors (Princess Mary Tudor)
