= True Tears =

Japanese visual novel

- Cover art of the regular edition of the original visual novel.
- Genre: Drama, Romance
- Video game
- Developer: La'cryma
- Publisher: La'cryma (Windows); Sweets (PS2)
- Genre: Visual novel
- Platform: Windows, PlayStation 2
- Released: March 31, 2006 (Windows); August 7, 2008 (PS2)
- Manga
- Written by: La'cryma
- Illustrated by: Asaki
- Published by: Flex Comix
- Magazine: Comi Digi (former); Comi Digi +
- Original run: December 10, 2005 – August 21, 2006
- Volumes: 1
- Live-action film
- Directed by: Kazuya Hatazawa
- Released: December 22, 2006
- Anime television series
- True Tears

True Tears (stylized as true tears) is a Japanese visual novel developed by La'cryma, a collaboration between Broccoli, Circus, GameCrab and Rei Izumi, and was originally released on March 31, 2006, for the Windows as a DVD in Japan rated for everyone, followed by a Hong Kong and Taiwanese release on March 31, 2007. A PlayStation 2 version was first announced to be released on March 13, 2008, but was later delayed for an August 7, 2008, release. The gameplay in True Tears follows a linear plot line, which offers pre-determined scenarios and courses of interaction, and focuses on the appeal of the five female main characters.

True Tears has made several transitions to other media. A manga adaptation illustrated by Japanese artist Asaki was first serialized in the Japanese magazine Comi Digi (later Comi Digi +) between December 10, 2005, and August 21, 2006. A thirteen-episode anime was created by P.A. Works and aired in Japan between January 6, 2008, and March 30, 2008, but has little in common with the visual novel other than the name. Two Internet radio shows, two drama CDs, and a live action drama adaptation have also been produced.

== Gameplay ==
A conversation in True Tears depicting the main character talking to Katsura.

The gameplay in True Tears requires little player interaction as much time is spent on reading the text that appears on the lower portion of the screen, representing either dialogue between characters, or the inner thoughts of the protagonist. Before the beginning of every week in the game's storyline, the player is given the option to plan a schedule, and is allowed to pick and view any three days of the given week. Different events occur depending on the days that the player chooses. Every so often, the player will come to a "decision point" where he or she is given the chance to choose from options that are displayed on the screen, typically two to three at a time. Depending on which choice the player makes, the "tear points" of the heroine associated with the events of the day would either increase, decrease, or remains the same. "Tear points" act as a system notifying the player how well he or she is treating a certain character. If a character's tear points exceed the maximum amount of eight, her ending is rendered inaccessible during that specific playthrough. There are multiple plot lines that the player will have the chance to experience. To view all of the plot lines, the player will need to replay the game multiple times and make different schedules and choices during decision points to progress the plot in an alternate direction.

== Plot and characters ==
The main female characters from True Tears: Honoka (top-left), Io (top-center), Katsura (top-right), Yuzuko (bottom-left), and Rui (bottom-right).

The story of True Tears revolves around the protagonist Tetsuya Mizuno (水野 哲也, Mizuno Tetsuya), a third year high school student whose role the player assumes, and his interactions with his schoolmates during the second half of his final year attending Mizuho Academy (瑞鳳学園, Mizuho Gakuen), in which the main part of the story takes place. Tetsuya meets Yuzuko Sanada (真田 柚子, Sanada Yuzuko; Voiced by: Yūna Inamura), a heroine and a childhood friend whom he nicknamed Yuzu one day on his way to school. Yuzuko actually has a crush on Tetsuya. To her advantage, she is skilled at cooking and homemaking, but has a timid personality. He later also meets Rui Nakane (仲根 るい, Rui Nakane; Voiced by: Yui Itsuki) at the pool after running errands for Asumi Akiyama (秋山 飛美, Akiyama Asumi; Voiced by: Kyōko Hikami), his cousin who is also the school nurse. Rui is the main heroine in the story, who holds vast knowledge, and is very affectionate towards animals to the extent where her aim is to become a veterinarian. Despite her love toward animals, she has a severe fear of touching cats due to a past incident.

Example of the schedule system used in True Tears.

Tetsuya is later confronted by Katsura Yukishiro (雪代 かつら, Yukishiro Katsura; Voiced by: Rina Satō), another heroine. Katsura is the student council president of the school. She is intelligent, and often places herself at the top of academic rankings. Despite being a third year student like Tetsuya, she is actually one year older than he is, taking a year off due to her father's suicide in the past. Tetsuya later also meets Honoka Uehara (上原 穂香, Uehara Honoka; Voiced by: Erina Nakayama), also a heroine who attends his class. Honoka shows great interest in literature but is really shy and timid. She is in fact a net idol, and goes by the handle Asumi, named after Tetsuya's cousin Asumi, whom she admires. Tetsuya also meets Io Sakuragawa (桜川 依緒, Sakuragawa Io; Voiced by: Sakura Nogawa), True Tears' last main heroine, after breaking up a fight between her and her brother. Io is an energetic second year student who is actually a voice actress. She often uses her acting skills, such as faking her tears, to tip the situation in her favor.

Other characters include Hikari Ogasawara (小笠原 光里, Ogasawara Hikari; Voiced by: Ami Koshimizu), a friend of Yuzuko's, and Mako Momose (百瀬 真子, Momose Mako; Voiced by: Akeno Watanabe), Io's fellow broadcasting club member who strives to be a comedian. The two often appears together as supporting characters, but in addition to Asumi Akiyama, the two are also side-heroines. Keigo Sakuragawa (桜川 圭悟, Sakuragawa Keigo; Voiced by: Hideki Tasaka) is Io's stubborn elder brother. Despite usually arguing with his sister over her ideals, he is actually quite fond of her and sometimes gets overprotective, to her dismay. Riku Morioka (森岡 陸, Morioka Riku; Voiced by: Masahito Yabe) is a friend of Mizuno. He is often depicted as a comic relief character, but also accompanies the protagonist on events like the school's festival. Gion Inoue (井上 祇園, Inoue Gion; Voiced by: Yukari Fukui) is a girl whose childish appearance resembles a grade school student. She constantly mixes in onomatopoeia phrases in her speeches.

== Development ==
True Tears was first announced on May 4, 2005, at the Dream Party convention hosted at the Tokyo Big Sight. It was announced as the first project by the visual novel studio La'cryma, a collaboration among visual novel studios Broccoli, Circus, GameCrab, and Japanese artist Rei Izumi. The executive producers for the visual novel were Takaaki Kitani from Broccoli, and Tororo from Circus. While their respective companies also led the planning, the scenario is worked on by Nonoka Maihama and GameCrab. Art direction was headed by Rei Izumi, known for her work on Hibiki's Magic and .hack//Legend of the Twilight, who also provided character designs. Music from the game was composed entirely by Kometto Nekono, who had also provided music for the Da Capo series.

=== Release history ===
True Tears was first released for Windows on March 31, 2006, as both a limited edition and a regular edition. The limited edition contained the game itself, a handkerchief, and a calendar; the regular edition did not contain the aforementioned extras. It was then followed by a Hong Kong and Taiwanese release on March 31, 2007, published by T-Time Technology. A PlayStation 2 version published by Sweets was announced to be released on March 13, 2008, but was later delayed for an August 7, 2008, release. The PS2 game contained the game itself, a drama CD and an illustration booklet.

== Related media ==
=== Internet radio shows ===
There were two Internet radio shows based on True Tears. The first radio show was titled Radio True Tears: Rui and Honoka's Mizuho Academy Broadcasting Club (ラジオトゥルーティアーズ るいと穂香の瑞鳳学園放送部(T_T), Radio True Tears: Rui to Honoka no Mizuho Gakuen hōsō bu), and was hosted by Yui Itsuki, Erina Nakayama, and Yukari Fukui. It began broadcasting on November 4, 2005, on Radio Kansai, followed by an online stream every Wednesday, and continued to broadcast every Friday until March 31, 2006. It was followed by a second radio show titled Yui and Sakura's Tear Radio: Special (ゆいとさくらの てぃあらじ 番外編, Yui to Sakura no Tia Raji: Bangai-hen) hosted by Yui Itsuki and Sakura Nogawa. It was first streamed online on June 8, 2006, with a new episode streamed online on every second and fourth Sunday of the month. It was retitled Yūna and Erina's Tear Radio: Pure Album (優奈と恵里奈の てぃあらじ 〜pure album〜, Yūna to Erina no Tia Raji: Pure Album) on November 10, 2006, after the host was changed to Yūna Inamura and Erina Nakayama, and continued to be streamed under that title until September 28, 2007.

The cover of the True Tears manga volume.

=== Manga ===
A manga adaptation by Japanese artist Asaki began serialization in the bi-monthly seinen manga magazine Comi Digi published by Broccoli on December 10, 2005. It was later transferred to Comi Digi + on April 21, 2006, after the magazine was renamed, and ended serialization on August 21, 2006, spanning a total of five chapters. It was collected into a single bound volume, containing an extra chapter, and was released on December 21, 2006.

=== Audio CDs ===
Two pieces of theme music were used in the visual novel. Noriyatsu Agematsu, who has previously also provided composition for Galaxy Angel, wrote the opening and ending themes, "Tears in Snow", sung by Hiromi Satō, and "On Towards Tomorrow with You" (君とあしたへ, Kimi to Ashita e), sung by Yozuca*. Tororo, who had previously provided composition and lyrics for the Da Capo series, written the lyrics for the songs. Two singles were released containing the two theme songs. The first, a maxi single titled "Tears in Snow", was released on December 23, 2005, containing both the opening theme, and the opening theme used in the first radio show, titled "Melody". The second single, titled "Kimi to Ashita e", was released on April 26, 2006, containing the ending theme and remixed versions of the song.

Two drama CDs based on True Tears was also produced. The first drama CD, titled X'mas Party, first available to the public on December 29, 2005, as part of a set of True Tears related products sold during Comiket 69. It was followed by a second drama CD, titled Mizuho Academy High School Department Cultural Festival (瑞鳳学園高等部文化祭, Mizuho Gakuen Kōtōbu Bunkasai), released as an extra to those who have pre-ordered the original game. A third drama CD was included with the PlayStation 2 game, on August 7, 2008.

=== Live action movie ===
True Tears was also adapted into a 35-minute live action film entitled True Tears: Pure Album. The film was released on December 22, 2006, as a direct-to-video release. It was directed by Kazuya Hatazawa, and starred Azusa Takeda as Rui Nakane, Arisa Suzuki as Yuzuko Sanada, Makoto Kawahara as Katsura Yukishiro, Miki Tachibana as Honoka Uehara, and Hikari Kajiwara as Io Sakuragawa. Yūna Inamura and Erina Nakayama, who voiced Yuzuko Sanada and Honoka Uehara in the visual novel respectively, also appeared in the film.

=== Anime ===
A thirteen-episode anime also named True Tears aired on TV Kanagawa between January 6, 2008, and March 29, 2008. Despite sharing the same title, the anime series otherwise shares no relation with the original game, using a different storyline featuring different characters. The anime series was produced by P.A. Works and was directed by Junji Nishimura, with screenplay written by Mari Okada, while La'cryma is still credited for creating the original work.

== Reception and sales ==
Unlike Da Capo II, one of the two games that often appeared alongside True Tears in advertising campaigns, the game did not enjoy as high of a sales record, ranking forty-first out of fifty on the national ranking of bishōjo games based on amount sold in Japan during the last two weeks of March 2006, compared to D.C. II's first place debut on the same chart two months later.
