= Ryōko Shintani =

Ryoko Shintani
- 新谷良子
- Born: March 31, 1981 (age 45); Kanazawa, Ishikawa, Japan
- Occupations: Voice actress; singer
- Years active: 2001–present
- Agent: Vi-vo
- Height: 158 cm (5 ft 2 in)
- Musical career
- Genres: J-Pop; Anison
- Instruments: Vocals, guitar
- Years active: 2003–present
- Label: Lantis

Ryōko Shintani (新谷良子, Shintani Ryōko; born March 31, 1981) is a Japanese voice actress and singer from Kanazawa, Ishikawa. She is under the Lantis and Vi-vo Recording Label and famous as the voice of Milfeulle Sakuraba in the Galaxy Angel Series. She also sang along with Yukari Tamura, Miyuki Sawashiro, Mayumi Yamaguchi and Mika Kanai as the group Angel-Tai.

== Filmography ==
Work	Character	Start Date
Galaxy Angel	Milfeulle Sakuraba	2001-04-07
Eiken	Mika	2003
Onegai Twins	Haruko Shido	2003-07-15
Mermaid Melody Pichi Pichi Pitch Pure	Mikaru Amagi	2004-04-03
DearS	Natsuki Ikuhara (幾原 菜月, Ikuhara Natsuki)	2004-07-10
W Wish	Haruhi Inohara (井ノ原春陽, Inohara Haruhi)	2004-09-07
My-HiME	Aoi Senō (瀬能 あおい, Senō Aoi)	2004-09-30
Pani Poni Dash!	Akira Miyata (宮田 晶, Miyata Akira)	2005-07-03
My-Otome	Aoi Senō (アオイ・セノー, Aoi Senō)	2005-10-06
Kage Kara Mamoru!	Airi Sawagashi (沢菓 愛里, Sawagashi Airi)	2006-01-07
Kashimashi: Girl Meets Girl	Jum Pu	2006-01-11
Hime-sama Goyōjin	Himeko Tsubaki	2006-04-12
Gadget Trial	Souka	2006-06-23
Red Garden	Rachel Benning	2006-10-22
Hidamari Sketch series	Sae (沙英, Sae)	2007-01-11
Kaze no Stigma	Miracle C	2007-04-13
Kenkō Zenrakei Suieibu Umishō	Sanae Kise	2007-07-03
Sayonara Zetsubō Sensei	Nami Hitō	2007-07-07
Kure-nai	Yūno Hōzuki (崩月夕乃, Hōzuki Yūno)	2008-04-03
Soulcalibur IV	Chai Xianghua	2008-07-29
Maria Holic	Sachi Momoi	2009-01-05
Saki	Kaori Senoo	2009-10-03
The Sacred Blacksmith	Elsa	2009-10-03
Rune Factory 3	Sakuya	2009-10-22
Arakawa Under the Bridge	Tetsuro	2010-04-04
Amagami SS	Rihoko Sakurai	2010-07-02
Koumajou Densetsu II: Yougen no Chingonka	Chen, Marisa Kirisame	2010-12-30
Puella Magi Madoka Magica	Hitomi Shizuki	2011-01-06
Hen Zemi	Anna Katou	2011-04-08
Kaitō Tenshi Twin Angel: Kyun Kyun Tokimeki Paradise!!	Salome	2011-07-05
Amagami SS+ plus	Rihoko Sakurai	2012-01-05
Moe Can Change!	Hakase	2012-05-25
Joshiraku	Uzannu Uzattei	2012-09-27
Love Lab	Suzune Tanahashi	2013-07-04
Non Non Biyori	Konomi Fujimiya	2013-10-07
Magica Wars	Yuri Inuwashi	2014-04-08
Koumajou Remilia: Scarlet Symphony	Marisa Kirisame	2022-07-28
Makina-san's a Love Bot?!	Ōya-san	2025-04-07

=== Dubbing ===
- The Big Bang Theory, Penny (Kaley Cuoco)
- Greta, Erica Penn (Maika Monroe)
- Into the Blue, Sam Nicholson (Jessica Alba)

== Discography ==
=== Singles ===
- 2003-08-27: Waga mama date show (ワガママ date show)
- 2003-09-26: Ai no Uta Dakara (あいのうただから)
- 2003-10-22: ray of sunshine
- 2004-09-23: Koi no Kōzō/Trickster (恋の構造 / トリックスター)
- 2004-11-26: Wonderstory/HAPPY END
- 2005-03-02: Sekai de Ichiban Boku ga Suki! (世界でいちばんボクが好き！) — theme song for Damekko Doubutsu anime television series
- 2005-10-05: Happiest Princess — opening theme for White Princess the second PS2 game
- 2006-05-24: CANDY☆POP☆SWEET☆HEART — ending theme for Hime-sama Goyoujin anime television series
- 2007-06-27: The Lost Symphonies
- 2008-05-21: crossing days - ending theme for Kure-nai anime television series
- 2008-10-22: Tsuki to Orgel (月とオルゴール)
- 2009-06-03: ReTIME
- 2009-11-25: Piece of love
- 2010-03-24: Magic Spell
- 2010-10-06: HONEY TEE PARTY!
- 2011-10-26: Euphoric Prayer
- 2012-02-14: AUTOMATIC SENSATION
- 2010-08-24: HOSHI

=== Albums ===
- 2003-03-07: Pink no Bambi (ピンクのバンビ)
- 2004-04-28: Fancy Frill (ファンシー☆フリル)
- 2005-05-25: Pretty Good!
- 2006-11-15: Sora ni Tokeru Niji to Kimi no Koe (空にとける虹と君の声)
- 2007-12-19: Wonderful World
- 2009-02-18: Marching Monster
- 2011-06-22: Unlocker
- 2013-08-14: Blooming Line

=== Compilations ===
- 2007-02-14: The Great bambi Pop Swindle
- 2011-02-09: BEST BAMBI BOX

=== Other ===
- 2004-12-22: chu→lip revolver (chu→lip☆リボルバー)
- 2005-07-21: LoveRevo Uhhyara CD - Tulip 'Ten' no maki (ラブリボうっひゃらCD ちゅーりっぷ「天」の巻)
- 2005-08-24: LoveRevo Uhhyara CD - Tulip 'Chi' no maki (ラブリボうっひゃらCD ちゅーりっぷ「地」の巻)
- 2005-10-26: LoveRevo Uhhyara CD - Tulip 'Jin' no maki (ラブリボうっひゃらCD ちゅーりっぷ「人」の巻)
- 2006-04-05: Otanjoubi CD LoveRevo ~hime to anata to obake-chan~ (おたんじょうびCD らぶりぼ～姫とあなたとおばけちゃん～)

=== DVD ===
- 2005-06-29: Happy Happy Smile '05 chu→lip Quest (はっぴぃ・はっぷぃ・すまいる'05 chu→lip☆くぇすと)
- 2005-12-21: Happy Happy Smile '05 chu→lip Legend (はっぴぃ・はっぷぃ・すまいる'05 chu→lip＊Legend)
- 2007-06-27: Happy Happy Smile '07 chu→lip Army (はっぴぃ・はっぷぃ・すまいる'07 chu→lip＊ARMY)
