= Maho Tomita =

Japanese actress and singer

- 富田 麻帆
- Born: June 1, 1987 (age 39); Tokyo, Japan
- Occupations: Actress, voice actress, singer
- Years active: 1993–present
- Agent: Suns Entertainment
- Known for: Revue Starlight as Maya Tendō

Maho Tomita (富田 麻帆, Tomita Maho; born June 1, 1987) is a Japanese actress, voice actress, and singer from Tokyo who is affiliated with Suns Entertainment. She is known for her role as Maya Tendō in the multimedia franchise Revue Starlight. In 2005, her song "Hare Nochi Hare!" (晴れのちハレ!) was used as the opening to the anime series Kamichu!

== Career ==
Tomita was born in Tokyo on June 1, 1987. She began her career in the entertainment industry in 1993. She would then appear in television series, films and stage plays. She also released three gravure DVDs between 2003 and 2004.

In 2005, she made her debut as a musician with the release of the single "Hare Nochi Hare!" (晴れのちハレ!); the title song was used as the opening theme to the anime series Kamichu!. In 2006, she released the song "Ma Mo Ru!", which was used as the opening theme to the anime series Mamoru-kun ni Megami no Shukufuku o!, and the song "Happy Flight", which was used as the opening theme to the anime series Galaxy Angel Rune. She released an album titled M in 2007.

In 2017, she was cast as the character Maya Tendō in the multimedia franchise Revue Starlight, initially playing the character in the project's stage plays and later reprising the role for its 2018 anime adaptation.

== Filmography ==
=== Anime ===
2018

- Revue Starlight as Maya Tendō
