= Hime-sama Goyōjin =

Japanese anime television series

- Princess Be Careful
- Hime-sama Goyōjin logo

姫様ご用心 (Hime-sama Goyōjin)
- Genre: Comedy, Slice of life story
- Anime television series
- Directed by: Shigehito Takayanagi
- Music by: Katsuyuki Harada
- Studio: Nomad
- Original network: WOWOW, Animax
- Original run: 12 April 2006 – 19 July 2006
- Episodes: 12

Princess Be Careful (姫様ご用心, Hime-sama Goyōjin) is a 12 episode anime series, produced by Nomad, that aired on WOWOW from April 12, 2006, to July 19, 2006. It has been aired by the anime television network Animax across its networks worldwide, including its English language premiere in Southeast Asia, starting from October 2007 and ended in November 2007.

== Plot ==
Himeko Tsubaki bumps into a pair of thieves called Leslie and Karen. She accidentally takes one of their bags containing a magic crown. Placing the crown on her head will magically turn her into a princess, and eventually fulfilling all of her wishes.

Her classmates and teachers believe her to be a princess, but she becomes a target of various people who want the crown for themselves. Tagging along is the true owner of the crown, a child princess named Nana.

== Characters ==
- Tsubaki Himeko (椿 姫子) Voiced by: Ryōko Shintani

She's your typical Xenophobic girl who happens to find a magical crown that belongs to Nana. She likes to eat, and has the habit of misunderstanding things. Named Christie Tsubaki in the Animax dub.

- Nana (ナーナ) Voiced by: Ui Miyazaki

Nana is the girl that keeps following Himeko around, and though no-one understands her, in the later episodes she manages to say something to Karen, Leslie and Himeko. She owns the crown Himeko is wearing.

- Banana (バ·ナーナ)

Banana is a monkey, and a pet of Nana. Banana often makes trouble, even stealing Leslie's underpants.

- Nabana Sobana (菜花そばな) Voiced by: Miyuki Sawashiro

Sobana is Himeko's best friend with this sock puppet shaped like a cat (assuming cat-like intonations in the process). She was once locked up in prison, when she was caught wearing gloves as the law forbids them to wear gloves. She is named "Winnie" in the Animax dub.

- Misuzu Aoi (美涼葵) Voiced by: Kozue Yoshizumi

Aoi is perfect in school. She constantly hates Himeko since she misunderstands Aoi on poisoning Nana, which Nana caught when Aoi slipped, making Nana choke, and has vanished temporarily. She helped Karen and Leslie once. Named Prefect Maple in the Animax dub.

- Kode Mari (小出まり) Voiced by: Yuri Shiratori

Himeko's teacher at school. She often fights with Aoi, and she is the reason why Chief X has been following Himeko around. Named Marie (Often mispronounced by various characters as 'Marian".) in the Animax dub.

- Tsubaki Ebine (椿えびね) Voiced by: Yuri Amano

Ebine is Himeko's mother.

- Tsubaki Sanjūrō (椿山十郎) Voiced by: Shinpachi Tsuji

Sanjūrō is Himeko's father, who often sleeps while seated in the toilet due to all-nighters (because he is a policeman).

- Karen (カレン) Voiced by: Chiemi Chiba

A professional thief. Karen knew Leslie since their childhood. Named Helen in the Animax dub.

- Leslie (レスリー) Voiced by: Yōhei Tadano

A professional thief. Leslie is best friends with Karen. Named Louise in the Animax dub.

- Adron (アドロン) Voiced by: Kohsuke Toriumi

An assassin whose mission is to kill Himeko to get her crown--a mission he cannot fulfill because he has developed a crush on her. Named Alan in the Animax dub.

- Rasse (ラッセ) Voiced by: Asami Sanada
- Prime Minister Imo (イーモー大臣) Voiced by: Mika Kanai
- Miss Yoko (ミス·ヨーコ) Voiced by: Yūko Kaida
- Chief X (首領X) Voiced by: Norio Wakamoto

== Episode list ==
No.	Title	Original release date
1	"My Mother. My Crown. My Goodness. (Pun on "oukan")" Transliteration: "Okan Ōkan Korya Akan" (Japanese: オカン王冠こりゃあかん)	April 12, 2006
2	"Watch Out For The Princess Of Tennis!"; Transliteration: "Ayaushi Tenisu no Ōjo-sama" (Japanese: あやうしテニスの王女様)	April 19, 2006
3	"Our Guest Is An Assassin Driven Mad!"; Transliteration: "Okyaku wa Shikaku de Zettai Zetsumei" (Japanese: お客は刺客で絶体絶命)	April 26, 2006
4	"My Boyfriend Makes Too Much Noise!"; Transliteration: "Watashi no Kare wa Sawagi sugi" (Japanese: わたしの彼はさわぎすぎ)	May 10, 2006
5	"Himeko Is Whose Child, A Cat's?"; Transliteration: "Himeko Dare no Ko Nyanko no Ko?" (Japanese: 姫子誰の子ニャン子の子?)	May 17, 2006
6	"Nana From The Kingdom Of Cats!"; Transliteration: "Nyanko no Kuni no Nāna" (Japanese: ニャンコの国のナーナ)	May 24, 2006
7	"An Arbitrarily Decided, Teacher-Student Relationship!"; Transliteration: "Katte ni Shitei, Shitei ni Kettei!" (Japanese: 勝手に指定、師弟に決定!)	June 14, 2006
8	"Victory? Defeat? Try And Guess!"; Transliteration: "Shōso? Haiso? Itte Miso!" (Japanese: 勝訴? 敗訴? 言ってみそ!)	June 21, 2006
9	"I Didn't Know Part-Time Work Was This Dangerous! (Pun on "abito")" Transliteration: "Baito Yabai to Shiranai to" (Japanese: バイトヤバイと知らないと)	June 28, 2006
10	"The Fact That The Crown Can Be Taken Off Must Be Kept Secret!"; Transliteration: "Toreta Ōkan Baretara Ikan" (Japanese: 取れた王冠ばれたらいかん)	July 5, 2006
11	"This World Exists Just For Na-Na!"; Transliteration: "Nāna no Tame ni Sekai wa Aru no" (Japanese: ナーナのために世界はあるの)	July 12, 2006
12	"This World Is Right ...For a Change!"; Transliteration: "Sekai wa Ii Kagen de Ii Kagen" (Japanese: 世界はいいかげんで良い加減)	July 19, 2006

== Production ==
=== Staff ===
- Director: Shigehito Takayanagi
- Episode director: Yuki Nanoka (ep 8)
- Original work: Shigehito Takayanagi
- Original character design: Mitsue
- Character design: Makoto Koga
- Color design: Hiroko Umezaki
- Art director: Kazuya Fukuda
- Editing: Bun Hida
- Director of photography: Yumiko Morimoto
- Music: Katsuyuki Harada
- Music producer: Yoshiyuki Ito
- Sound director: Yoshikazu Iwanami
- Sound effects: Minoru Yamada

== Music ==
=== Opening Theme ===
- 百発百中とらぶるん♪ (Hyappatsu Hyakuchū Toraburun♪)
  Lyrics by: Aki Hata
  Composition by: Shinji Tamura
  Arrangement by: Masaki Suzuki
  Song by: Ryōko Shintani and Ui Miyazaki

=== Ending Theme ===
- CANDY☆POP☆SWEET☆HEART
  Lyrics, Composition and Arrangement by: R·O·N
  Song by: Ryōko Shintani
  Music by: PINK BAMBI

Note: Ryōko Shintani and Ui Miyazaki sang the theme songs under the name of Himeko Tsubaki and Nana.
