= Masato Takayanagi =

Japanese anime director

Masato Takayanagi (高柳 滋仁, Takayanagi Masato) is a Japanese anime director.

== Works ==
=== Anime television series ===
- Azumanga Daioh: Storyboard (eps 7, 14, 18, 23), Episode Director (eps 7, 13, 18, 23)
- Cardcaptor Sakura: Storyboard (eps 40, 46, 57, 68), Episode Director (eps 40, 46–47, 57, 64, 68)
- Flame of Recca: Storyboard, Episode Director
- Galaxy Angel: Storyboard, Unit Director
- Galaxy Angel A: Director, Storyboard, Unit Director (OP)
- Galaxy Angel S: Director
- Galaxy Angel X – Director
- Hime-sama Goyōjin – Director, Original Work
- Kanamemo – Director, Storyboard (Ep. 1), Episode Director (Ep. 1)
- Maze – Storyboard (ep 21)
- Panyo Panyo Di Gi Charat – Director, Storyboard (Eps. 1–4, 10, 47, 48), Episode Director (Eps. 1–4, 9–12, 17–20, 47)
- Rumbling Hearts – Storyboard (ep 9), Episode Director (ep 9)
- Shin Megami Tensei: Devil Children – Episode Director
- Skull Man – Storyboard (ep 4)
- Sola – Storyboard (ep 9), Episode Director (ep 9)
- The World God Only Knows – Director
- The World God Only Knows II – Director
- Tokyo ESP – Director
- Dagashi Kashi – Director, Series Composition
- Blood Blockade Battlefront & Beyond – Director

=== Anime movie ===
- Ninku the Movie – Production General Assistant
- Cardcaptor Sakura: The Movie – Assistant Animation Director, Screenplay Association
- Cardcaptor Sakura Movie 2: The Sealed Card – Storyboard, Direction Cooperation
