= Mamoru-kun ni Megami no Shukufuku o! =

Japanese light novel and anime series

- Mamoru-kun ni Megami no Shukufuku wo!
- Logo from the anime series

護くんに女神の祝福を!
- Genre: Romantic comedy
- Light novel
- Written by: Hiroki Iwata
- Illustrated by: Toshiyuki Satō
- Published by: MediaWorks
- Imprint: Dengeki Bunko
- Magazine: Dengeki hp
- Original run: September 25, 2003 – March 25, 2009
- Volumes: 16
- Anime television series
- Directed by: Itsuro Kawasaki
- Written by: Mari Okada
- Music by: Noriyasu Agematsu
- Studio: Zexcs
- Original network: Wowow
- Original run: October 6, 2006 – March 30, 2007
- Episodes: 24

Mamoru-kun ni Megami no Shukufuku o! (護くんに女神の祝福を!; lit. "To Mamoru-kun, the Blessings of the Goddess!"), also known as Venus to Mamoru, is a Japanese light novel series written by Hiroki Iwata and illustrated by Toshiyuki Satō following Mamoru Yoshimura and his far-from-normal high school life with girlfriend Ayako Takasu, who possess magical powers called "Beatrice".

The series was first published on September 25, 2003, by MediaWorks. An anime television series adaptation animated by Zexcs was broadcast on Wowow from October 6, 2006, to March 30, 2007, airing 24 episodes.

== Plot ==
Mamoru-kun ni Megami no Shukufuku wo! centers around Mamoru Yoshimura, a high school student who gets accepted into a prestigious school for students endowed with the power of Beatrice due to his high intellect. Right after first entering the school on his first day, he meets the mysterious Ayako Takasu, also known as the Beatrice's Angel of Death, who is a pretty and popular female student whose powers exceed most others. Moments later, Ayako, who has never been known to show a smile, suddenly confesses her strong feelings for Mamoru, despite having never met him before. That same day, he is brought in as a member of the student council as Ayako's side as he becomes involved with the dangers and mysteries related to the power of Beatrice.

== Characters ==
=== Student council members ===
Mamoru Yoshimura (吉村護, Yoshimura Mamoru)
Voiced by: Akiko Kimura
Mamoru is a petit 16-year-old high school student with a beguiling smile who transfers to the prestigious Beatrice Academy due to his high intellect and high aptitude for Beatrice, which is revealed to be seventh highest in the history of the school. On his first day at school, he not only becomes a member of the student council, but also the boyfriend of fellow student council member, Ayako Takasu, who confessed her love for him earlier that day. He is a soft spoken character who is unsure of why Ayako would like someone like him. He officially becomes Ayako's boyfriend after they defeat an enemy together. Mamoru can't seem to say no to the student council and ends up involved in their zany schemes because of it. He is fascinated with Beatrice because when he was younger he was trapped by a disaster and rescued by a man using Beatrice who turns out to have been Ayako's uncle who, along with Ayako, had been trapped along with Mamoru and numerous other people.
Ayako Takasu (鷹栖絢子, Takasu Ayako)
Voiced by: Mikako Takahashi
Ayako is a very beautiful and well-endowed second year high school girl. She is one of the most powerful Beatrice users in the world, which is why she is sometimes targeted by assassins. Usually, Ayako is a very serious girl, who has never been known to smile around others. However, whenever she is around Mamoru, she can't help but blush and smile a little. Ayako ends up being Mamoru's girlfriend after their first fight with an enemy. Ayako's parents thought of her as a freak and abandoned her. She grew up living alone with a caretaker in her grandfather's mansion, which may help to explain her asocial personality prior to meeting Mamoru.
Maya Sudō (周藤摩耶, Sudō Maya)
Voiced by: Daisuke Ono
Maya is the student council president who has a strong character, which complements his status. He often does things that irritate Ayako to the point of earning a heavy punch from her. While browsing through Maya's picture album, Mamoru realizes that all of Maya's ex-girlfriends have long hair, and seems to realize that Maya has a crush on Ayako, who also has long hair.
Shione Sudō (周藤汐音, Sudō Shione)
Voiced by: Mamiko Noto
Shione is the vice president of the student council and Maya's younger sister. She often has a very extravagant hairstyle, which changes everyday, that even her own brother calls "complicated". Everyone became so used to her wacky hairstyles that they do not recognize her when she had her hair down. Maya was overjoyed to realize that he had such a cute little sister.
Mitsuki Fujita (藤田美月, Fujita Mitsuki)
Voiced by: Saeko Chiba
Mitsuki is the public relations officer of the student council. She always has a camera with her and takes many pictures of whatever is going on around her. Her favourite subject is Ayako; she sells these for outrageous prices. Beside pictures of Ayako, Mitsuki also takes pictures of the student council as Ayako punishes then for their latest scheme.
Anna Hase (長谷杏奈, Hase Anna)
Voiced by: Yuka Inokuchi
Anna is the secretary of the student council. She seems to be the most "normal" of all the student council officers.
Yōko Kirishima (桐島瑤子, Kirishima Yōko)
Voiced by: Fuyuka Oura
Yōko is the treasurer of the student council. She is very level-headed and confident, and is the tallest among the girls.
Yūka Maruyama (丸山友香, Maruyama Yūka)
Voiced by: Kimiko Koyama
Yūka is the science officer of the student council. She is very shy and soft spoken, and owns a pet dog named Al

.

Kōsuke Yagi (八木浩介, Yagi Kōsuke)
Voiced by: Shintarou Oohata
Kōsuke is the executive committee member of the student council. He is very tall and muscular, well versed in using weapons, and has a major quirk of speaking in English (he even sings a tune in English in one episode).

=== Others ===
Itsumi Yoshimura (逸美吉村?, Yoshimura Itsumi)
Voiced by: Ai Shimizu
She's Mamoru younger sister who, apparently, has a big "Brother Complex", although it seems to over come it through the series. She has also been the cook in the house since she was little because their mother isn't good at it.
Emelenzia Beatrix Rudiger (エメレンツェア·ベアトリクス·リューディガー, Emerentsea Beatorikusu Ryūdigā)
Voiced by: Asami Sanada
Emelenzia is a Beatrice user, and a genius who entered university at the age of twelve. She was an orphan until the Rudiger family acknowledged her potential and now aims to be strong enough to support her older brother, Johan, for whom she has the utmost respect. Emelenzia also admires Ayako since she was able to stand toe-to-toe with her brother in battle. On her brother's orders she tries to seduce Mamoru after she transfers so as to separate him from Ayako. Her efforts fail and she develops a crush on Mamoru. Later in the anime her feelings grow much stronger, to the point that she confesses even though Ayako is present.
Johan Deiter Rudiger (ヨハン·ディエター·リューディガー, Yohan Dietā Ryūdigā)
Voiced by: Takehito Koyasu
A German university student, who is called the Prussian Devil. He is one of the most powerful Beatrice users in the world. In their battle Ayako was seriously injured, while Johan barely had a scratch on him. Despite this it was called a draw. Because Ayako is capable of fighting against him on equal footing, he aims to have Ayako as his bride, as he considers no one else, especially not Mamoru, worthy of her. Besides his outstanding Beatrice control, Johan is also very intelligent and is investigating the origins of Beatrice with Ayako's uncle.
Tsuneo Abiko (我孫子恒夫, Abiko Tsuneo)
Voiced by: Taku Kimura
Tsuneo is a student in Mamoru's school who enthusiastically stalks Ayako. He is a very blatant in his obsession with Ayako and will stop at nothing to be close to her. He is revealed to be working with the Silver Maria for reasons unknown.
Maria
Voiced by: Hitomi Nabatame
Also known as the Silver Maria. The discoverer of Beatrice and the world's most powerful Beatrist. She and Ayako's uncle have a history together that is not revealed. She has developed devices that prevent people from using Beatrice and opposes Johan Rudiger and Ayako's uncle's plans to create a sentient form of Beatrice.

== Media ==
=== Light novels ===
Mamoru-kun ni Megami no Shukufuku wo! began as a light novel series written by Hiroki Iwata and illustrated by Toshiyuki Satō. It published from September 25, 2003, to March 25, 2009, in sixteen volumes, by MediaWorks.

=== Anime ===
An anime television series adaptation animated by Zexcs, written by Mari Okada, and directed by Itsuro Kawasaki aired in Japan on Wowow from October 6, 2006, to March 30, 2007, for a total of 24 episodes.

==== Episodes ====
No.	Title	Original release date
1	"Beatrice In Love" "Koisuru Biatorisu" (恋するビアトリス)	October 6, 2006
Mamoru Yoshimura has just transferred to a new school where students are able to control the mysterious magical power called Beatrice. On his first day, he meets Ayako Takasu, who promptly confesses her love for him. Everyone is interested in Mamoru because of this. Mamoru is then introduced to the Student Council members.
2	"Astral Fire Recovery Plan" "Asutoraru Faia Dakkan Sakusen" (アストラル·ファイア奪還作戦)	October 13, 2006
With the Astral Fire weapon stolen, it's up to Ayako and Mamoru to retrieve it. Luckily, this also gives Ayako some alone time with Mamoru on their first date together. Mamoru asks Ayako out again before Ayako can say otherwise, and she is surprised.
3	"Hide-and-Seek Of Youth" "Seishun no Kakurenbo" (青春のかくれんぼ)	October 20, 2006
Ayako and Mamoru get to school the next day only to find photos of them on their date, and a recording of their love confessions. The Student Council decides to throw a welcome party for Mamoru at Ayako's house, where he learns a little more about her past.
4	"Only My Prince" "Watashi Dake no Ōjisama" (私だけの王子様)	October 27, 2006
Mamoru is asked to play the Prince in the play Sleeping Beauty during the school festival. Ayako is asked to play the Princess, only to faint from a cold.
5	"Intertwined Hearts" "Kokoro o Kasanete" (こころを重ねて)	November 3, 2006
Ayako falls ill the day before the school festival. It's discovered that the Beatrice power within her is reacting to her puberty, and will take 3 days to normalize, which would force her to skip the play. Mamoru offers to use his Beatrice powers to help, though there is a major risk involved. Will they succeed in their plan?
6	"Ice Girl" "Kōri no Shōjo" (氷の少女)	November 10, 2006
Ayako and Mamoru spend less and less time together as the student council prepare for a ski trip. Little do they know they are being followed by the Prussian Demon's sister, Emelenzia Beatrix Rudiger. When Ayako asks Mamoru to come outside so they can talk, he runs to his room to get his gift for Ayako, and finds it broken. What is he going to do?
7	"I Dedicate to You..." "Anata ni Sasageru..." (あなたに捧げる...)	November 17, 2006
After trapping the student council in an avalanche, Emelenzia challenges Ayako to a duel, stating she has been sent by her brother to find out how weak Ayako has become since falling in love. Ayako gets knocked unconscious, and Mamoru blames himself for her not being able to fight with all she had. Ayako and Mamoru's Beatrice mix, and Ayako feels Mamoru's feelings towards her. Mamoru's gift is found repaired, and Emelenzia thinks it must be Mamoru's Beatrice.
8	"Steam Panic!" "Yukemuri Panikku!" (湯煙パニック!)	November 24, 2006
On the way back from their ski trip, the student council decides the stop at a hot spring. However, the president decides to play a game to see if they can deliver shampoo to the vice-president. The president wants Mamoru to come and join in on the fun because Ayako is there, but the vice-president has set up traps to keep the boys from reaching the hot spring. Who will win: the vice-president or the president?
9	"Together with Older Brother" "Onii-chan to Issho" (おにいちゃんといっしょ)	December 1, 2006
Ayako is invited to meet Mamoru's family. Itsumi has a problem cooking, so Mamoru and his mom go out shopping. Ayako helps Itsumi out with cooking and learns a little more about the relationship between the two siblings. When Itsumi knocks over the curry Ayako runs and gets a rag. Itsumi reveals that the "rag" is actually the blanket Mamoru sleeps with then. When they notice part of it is now yellow, Itsumi puts it in the curry to make it all yellow.
10	"Aim! Female High School Student!?" "Mezase! Joshikousei!?" (めざせ! ジョシコウセイ!?)	December 8, 2006
Emelenzia asks Ayako to help her understand Japanese culture. Since Ayako does not know what to try to teach her, she asks the fellow female Student Council members to help her out with the situation. In the process, Mamoru, the guys from the Student Council, and Ayako's servant go around town to show Mamoru what girls like to do. At the last place they stop, Mamoru walks into the room where the girls are having a fashion show, causing Ayako to lose control over her emotions and blow up the building. Finally Emelenzia transfers into Beatrice High School as a student, and also entrusts herself to Mamoru. Mamoru smiles at Emelenzia, and she starts to fall in love with him. Ayako does not want to share his smile with anyone, so she runs away with him before it gets too far out of hand.
11	"Yoshimura Mamoru Lovey-Dovey Operation" "Yoshimura Mamoru Romerome Sakusen!" (吉村護ろめろめ作戦!)	December 15, 2006
Emelenzia wants to break up Ayako and Mamoru so her brother can have Ayako and she can have Mamoru. So Emelenzia decides to help Mamoru with Beatrice control, but tries to seduce him while she is at it. While Emelenzia is trying to seduce him, Ayako sees the person Mamoru was supposed to be studying with, so she goes to look for him, and winds up seeing Emelenzia and Mamoru together.
12	"Beatrice Christmas" "Beatorisu Kurisumasu" (ビアトリス·クリスマス)	December 22, 2006
The episode begins where the last one ended, and Ayako runs away. The President of the Student Council goes to talk to Ayako and tells her that her hand-knitted sweater must be warm. She did not understand what he said. When Mamoru sees Ayako at the door to the Home Economics room and Ayako runs away, Mamoru runs after her and tells her what Emelenzia has been teaching him and his reason behind it. Mamoru shows what he has learned and they make up.
13	"The Devil Appears!" "Maō Arawaru!" (魔王あらわる!)	January 5, 2007
Johan, the person that Ayako dueled, has come to Japan to teach Beatrice control to some of the students at Beatrice High School, but in reality he has come to take Ayako away from Mamoru by isolating him from the Beatrice and making him pass out. Johan tells everyone that Mamoru pushed himself too far. Afterwards he tells everyone that Ayako is coming back to Germany with him.
14	"Ayako-san's Lover" "Ayako-san no Koibito" (絢子さんの恋人)	January 12, 2007
Ayako does not want to leave Mamoru, but her Beatrice is calling out for Johan. Ayako asks for Mamoru to say something, but he can't say anything at the time. So in turn Ayako and Johan start his research - "Return to the Origin" - by having Ayako touch the sphere. It reacts in a negative way and puts the entire school at stake.
15	"The Most Excellent Hair In The World" "Sekaiichi Ekuserento na Kami no Ke" (世界一えくせれんとな髪の毛)	January 26, 2007
Shione, vice-president of the Student Council, straightens her hair after watching a TV program, but no one recognizes her. The next day, she is back to her regular hair style. On the way to school, Ayako's grandfather calls and tells her that he is coming back.
16	"An Appearance Roiting President" "Sanjō, Abare Souri!?" (参上、暴れ総理!?)	February 2, 2007
Ayako's grandfather comes back to town and asks Ayako if she has a boyfriend. She denies it and her grandfather tells her that Johan told him that she did have a boyfriend. During an assembly, Ayako's grandfather asks the entire student body if she has a boyfriend. No one speaks up at first, and just as Mamoru is getting ready to say something, Abiko-senpai says loud and clear that he is Ayako's boyfriend. Everyone laughs, but Ayako's grandfather takes him seriously. What are Mamoru and Ayako going to do now that Abiko-senpai has said that he is Ayako's boyfriend?
17	"A Warning from the Southern Islands" "Minami no Shima no Chūihou" (南の島の注意報)	February 9, 2007
Mamoru and the Student Council go on a trip. On the plane ride over, Ayako and Mamoru make a plan to go to Rainbow Cliff, a special cliff that is rumored to keep a couple together forever if they kiss there. They go to a beach and Mamoru is asked by all the females, including Ayako, how they look, but Yagi-kun jumps into the middle of it and scares everyone. Ayako throws everyone else into the sea. After that, she and Mamoru are alone for a while. Mamoru compliments her, and the Vice-President and all the other girls gather around. Emelenzia falls into the water, and Mamoru goes to check on her, finding out that she has lost her swimsuit. When Mamoru falls in, Ayako rushes out to him. When Emelenzia, Mamoru, and Ayaoko get back to the hotel, they try to go back outside and do something alone only to get interrupted. Later, when they go to a cave to be alone, they get trapped inside by a large storm.
18	"In the Storm" "Arashi no Naka de" (嵐の中で)	February 16, 2007
The episode starts out with a flashback of when the man that could use Beatrice, Ayako, and Mamoru are stuck in the cave. The man goes to find the Student Council President and Vice-President. The Student Council follows him to where Ayako and Mamoru are. The man tells them that they have to destroy something called "prisms", because it eliminates the ability to use Beatrice. As the Student Council members start destroying the prisms, the Beatrice slowly comes back. When Emelenzia destroys the prism that in the flowing river, Mamoru and Ayako are able to do away with the storm and clear out the rocks. Mamoru discovers that the man from the flashbacks is none other than Misaki, Ayako's grandfather. After Ayako and Mamoru get to Rainbow Cliff, they share their memories that have come to lead up to an everlasting love and they share a kiss. After that, Misaki is seen on the phone getting ready to get on the plane, and it's revealed that he was talking to Johan.
19	"The Valentine of Scattering Fireworks" "Hibana Chiru Chiru Barentain" (火花散る散るバレンタイン)	February 23, 2007
Mamoru and Ayako just got back from their winter trip and it is almost Valentine's Day, but Ayako is acting weird while with Mamoru. The Student Council is having a contest to see which of the female student council members can get Mamoru's heart to beat the fastest. Abiko-senpai receives an email that says that he can win Ayako's heart. Mamoru and the Student Council President receive a bunch of chocolate. After Emelenzia gives Mamoru her chocolate, Ayako tells Mamoru and Emelenzia is acting like she is serious. Emelenzia then confesses her love to Mamoru with Ayako standing right there.
20	"Beatrice Erased?!" "Biatorisu Shōshitsu!?" (ビアトリス消失!?)	March 2, 2007
Mamoru is wondering if he is going to have to hurt Emelenzia's feelings. Abiko-senpai receives his package and is celebrating. Emelenzia has her two henchmen help her write a letter of challenge to Ayako over Mamoru. Ayako asks Emelenzia if she should take her confession as an open declaration of war. Just before the credits, Abiko-senpai shows up and throws his gift at Mamoru, and Ayako gets in the way. After the gift opens, it absorbs the person's Beatrice from them. What is going to happen to Ayako? Trivia: The end credits of Episode 19 stated that Episode 20 would be titled "Loss of Beatrice?!"
21	"I Don't Want To Go To Faraway Places" "Tōku e Itcha, Yada" (遠くへ行っちゃ、やだ)	March 9, 2007
Ayako has one week to unseal her Beatrice before her body has fuses with the Beatrice and kills her. Misaki invites her to his lab in Germany to help unseal her Beatrice, but Ayako feels that he is trying to get her involved with his research. Ayako and Mamoru talk with Mamoru's mom and sister about Mamoru going with Ayako going to Germany. Mamoru's mother is all for it, but Itsumi does not want him to go. Ayako turns down Misaki's invitation to come to Germany. Ayako collapses and tells Mamoru to stay for his classes while she goes to the nurse. Itsumi goes to Ayako's house to visit Ayako, but as she is leaving, she sees Abiko-senpai tying a rope to a pole. Abiko-senpai and Itsumi sneak into Ayako's place. The strange person that was outside Ayako's house is now trying to attack her. Mamoru and Emelenzia come to the rescue.
22	"Return to the Beginning" "Gensho e no Kikan" (原初への帰還)	March 16, 2007
Ayako, Mamoru and the President all go to Germany by plane to get Ayako's Beatrice unsealed. They come across the Silver Maria and her henchmen, who take Mamoru away. Ayako and Johan agree to help Misaki in his experiment; "Return to the Beginning". During the experiment, something goes wrong and causes the Beatrice to take the form of a creature that seems to want Ayako.
23	"The Invincible Duo" "Muteki na Futari" (無敵な二人)	March 23, 2007
Ayako gets absorbed by the Beatrice. Mamoru goes to save Ayako from the monster which almost makes him disappear. Every country is put on high alert and commences attacking the high spike of Beatrice. What is going to happen if Mamoru can't save Ayako?
24	"To Mamoru-kun, the blessings of the goddess!" "Mamoru-kun ni Megami no Shukufuku wo!" (護くんに女神の祝福を!)	March 30, 2007
Ayako and Mamoru destroy the Beatrice, seeming to die in the process. The school holds a funeral for them, but something appears to be amiss. It later reveals that they were having tests run on them after the last battle. Some members of the Council are getting ready to graduate, but what will be the outcome of this glorious reunion?

==== Theme songs ====
Opening theme
"MA·MO·RU!" by Maho Tomita
Ending theme
"Venus Dream" by Hiromi Satou
