= Hiromi Satō =

Hiromi Sato 佐藤 ひろ美
- Also known as: 佐藤裕美
- Born: December 10, 1970 (age 55); Iwate Prefecture, Japan
- Genres: Anison
- Occupations: Singer, songwriter
- Instrument: Vocals
- Years active: 2001–2016

Hiromi Sato (佐藤 ひろ美, Satō Hiromi; born December 10, 1970) is a Japanese former singer and songwriter from Iwate Prefecture. She has performed for songs for games and anime, such as Mizuiro, Please Twins!, Green Green, and the Galaxy Angel games. She has also written songs for other artists. Prior to December 10, 2005, her name was written as 佐藤裕美. She is affiliated with ARIA Entertainment and their composing group Elements Garden. She runs the company S Inc.

== Biography ==
During the 1990s, Hiromi Sato sang and played keyboard as part of the indies band Satyagraha. The band recorded only one album Park, before disbanding in 2000. Sato made her solo singing debut in 2000 with the song "Shield", ending theme for the PC game Kanaria: Kono omoi o uta ni nosete by Front Wing. In October 2001 she released her first major debut album, Looking for sign, a collection of game theme songs she had performed. She started performing theme songs for TV anime in 2003, where she performed the opening theme for the TV anime adaptation of Green Green, "Guri Guri", and the opening theme for Onegai Twins, "Second Flight", which was a duet with Kotoko. The "Second Flight" single reached number 15 on the Oricon charts, charting for 16 weeks. She had her first voice-acting role in the 2005 TV anime Sousei no Aquarion as Rena Rune.

In May 2007, Sato started her own company S Inc., a talent management and music production agency.

== Discography ==
=== Albums ===
List of albums, with selected chart positions
Title	Album information	Oricon
Title	Album information	Peak position
Hiromi Sato Game Theme Song Collection ~Looking for sign~	Released: October 30, 2001; Catalog No.: KMCA124	
Sugar Kiss	Released: January 22, 2003; Label: King Records; Catalog No.: KICA-1283	–
Angelica	Released: February 24, 2005; Label: Broccoli; Catalog No.: BRCF-3044, -3045; Format: CD + DVD	–
Brilliant Moon	Released: May 25, 2007; Label: Broccoli; Catalog No.: BRCF-3085, -3082	141
Merry! Merry-Go-Round	Released: February 4, 2009; Label: b-green; Catalog No.: QECB-1001	197
佐藤ひろ美 THE BEST-Sky Blue-	Released: September 22, 2010; Label: Lantis; Catalog No.: LACA-9199/200	189
佐藤ひろ美 THE BEST-Ever Green-	Released: September 22, 2010; Label: Lantis; Catalog No.: LACA-9197/8	198
RiSE	Released: August 22, 2012; Label: Lantis; Catalog No.: LACA-15207	237

=== Singles ===
List of singles, with selected chart positions
Title	Single information	Oricon	Album
Title	Single information	Peak position	Album
"Guri Guri"; TV anime Green Green opening theme, split single with Yuria	Released: August 6, 2003; Catalog No.: PCCG-70005		
"Second Flight"; Kotoko x Hiromi Sato; Theme song for Please Twins!	Released: July 24, 2003; Catalog No.: LACM-4101	15	
"Angelic Symphony"; PC game Galaxy Angel Eternal Lovers opening theme	Released: June 25, 2004; Catalog No.: BRDF-3031		
Owari Naki Prelude (終わりなきPrelude); PS2 game Galaxy Angel Eternal Lovers ending theme	Released: November 26, 2004; Catalog No.: BRDF-3038		
Koeda-chan no Ohayahho-♪ (こえだちゃんのおはやっほー♪); TV anime Midori no Kuni no Koeda-chan theme song	Released: December 23, 2004; Catalog No.: BRDF-3041		
Akatsuki no Sora o Kakeru (暁ノ空ヲ翔ル); TV anime Grenadier: Hohoemi no senshi theme song	Released: January 19, 2005; Catalog No. PCCG-70008		
Sugar season vol.1: Harukaze (春風)	Released: March 30, 2005; Catalog No.: AECL-1001		
Sugar season vol.2: Natsuhana (夏花)	Released: June 29, 2005; Catalog No.: AECL-1002		
"Milktea Kiss"; PC game Magical Canan -RISEA- theme song	Released: July 13, 2005; Catalog No.: AECL-1006		
Hello Goodbye (ハローグッバイ); PC game Green Green 3: Hello Goodbye opening theme	Released: July 21, 2005; Catalog No.: LACM-4206		
Toki no Musoubana (時代の無双花); TV anime Kidō Shinsengumi Moeyo Ken opening theme	Released: August 3, 2005; Catalog No.: LACM-4204		
Sugar season vol.3: Akitsuki (夏秋月)	Released: October 26, 2005; Catalog No.: AECL-1003		
Sugar season vol.4: Fuyu Koi (冬恋)	Released: December 21, 2005; Catalog No.: AECL-1004		
"Tears in snow" PC game True Tears opening theme	Released: December 23, 2005; Catalog No.: BRDF-3066		
"Dream Maker"; Radio show Satou Hiromi no Komideji opening theme	Released: March 17, 2006; Catalog No.: BRDA-1072		
Cause your love ~shiroi melody~ (Cause your love～白いmelody～); PS2 game Galaxy Angel II: Zettai Ryōiki no Tobira ending theme	Released: July 28, 2006; Catalog No.: BRDF-3073	68	
"Venus Dream"; TV anime Mamoru-kun ni Megami no Shukufuku o! ending theme	Released: November 24, 2006; Catalog No.: BRDF-3077	148	
Sayonara (サヨナラ); TV anime Mushi-Uta ending theme	Released: August 24, 2007; Catalog No.: BRDF-3087	148	
"Taiyō no Aria"; PS2 game Galaxy Angel II: Eigō Kaiki no Toki opening theme	Released: June 25, 2008; Catalog No.: BRCA-1083	86	
"Amber World"; PC game Amber Quartz opening theme	Released: December 17, 2008; Catalog No.: AXCL-0001		
Shukufukunokanpanera (祝福のカンパネラ)	Released: January 30, 2009; Catalog No.: HBMS-308		
Promise: Tsukiyo no Kioku (Promise ～月夜の記憶～); Hiromi Sato x Nana	Released: April 24, 2009; Catalog No. PBCS-0007	176	
Sorairo (そらいろ); PC game Sorairo opening theme	Released: August 26, 2009; Catalog No.: AXCL-0002		
"Kaiki Shinsei - recurrent nova - / Natsukaze Nostalgia"; Kotoko x Hiromi Sato; Theme song from: Onegai! 10th Anniversary	Released: August 7, 2013; Label: Lantis; Catalog No.: LACM-141127	54	

== Filmography ==
List of voice-acting performances in anime, films and video games
Year	Title	Role	Notes	Source
2003	Beast Fighter - The Apocalypse	Neo Naoh	TV Series ||	
2005	Genesis of Aquarion	Rena Rune	OVA and TV series	
2009	Galaxy Angel II Eigō Kaiki no Toki	Masala Ajito	3rd game in Galaxy Angel II series	
2010	Another Century's Episode: R	Rena Rune	PS3 game	
2011	Sutadol ja:すたどる！	NoeL	PC adult game	
