= Erina Nakayama (actress, born 1987) =

Japanese voice actress

- 中山 恵里奈
- Born: March 17, 1987 (age 39); Aichi, Japan
- Other names: Erinan (えりなん), Enna-chan (えんなちゃん)
- Occupation: voice actress

Erina Nakayama (中山 恵里奈, Nakayama Erina; born March 17, 1987) is a Japanese voice actress from Aichi Prefecture.

== Filmography ==
=== Anime ===
- We Were There as Yuri Yamamoto
- Canvas 2 ~Niji Iro no Sketch~ as Female student (ep 5)
- Galaxy Angel Rune as Lily C Sherbet
- Hametsu No Mars as Tomomi Nakahara
- Jubei-Chan 2: The Counter Attack of Siberia Yagyu as Freesia Yagyu
- Lucky Star as Miyuki Takara (drama CD & video game)
- True Tears as Honoka Uehara
