= Galaxy Angel II =

Sequel franchise to Galaxy Angel franchise

- Cover of the first Galaxy Angel II game, Galaxy Angel II Zettai Ryouiki no Tobira

ギャラクシーエンジェルII (Gyarakushī Enjeru II)
- Genre: Comedy, Science fiction
- Light novel
- Written by: Sumire Nanosuna
- Illustrated by: Kanan
- Published by: Kadokawa Shoten
- Magazine: Comptiq
- Published: August 15, 2005
- Volumes: 1
- Manga
- Written by: Kanan
- Published by: BROCCOLI
- Magazine: Comi Di Gi, Comi Digi +
- Original run: 10 December 2005 – 21 August 2008
- Volumes: 6
- Anime television series

Galaxy Angel Rune
- Directed by: Seiji Kishi
- Written by: Tadashi Hayakawa
- Music by: Katsuyuki Harada
- Studio: Satelight
- Licensed by: US: Bandai Visual USA
- Original network: TV Tokyo
- Original run: 1 October 2006 – 24 December 2006
- Episodes: 13

Galaxy Angel II (ギャラクシーエンジェルII, Gyarakushī Enjeru Tsū) is a sequel to the games, anime, and manga franchise of Galaxy Angel, and is the continuation of BROCCOLI's Project G.A.. It features a brand new cast of Angels called the Rune Angel Troupe, and according to the game Galaxy Angel II: Zettai Ryōiki no Tobira, is set 4 years after the end of the previous game, Galaxy Angel: Eternal Lovers.

In this sequel, due to the development of a method to cross-dimensions at the end of Galaxy Angel: Eternal Lovers, a new dimension called NEUE was discovered, which is linked to EDEN through a space called ABSOLUTE, a central hub to which all dimensions are linked. This hub cannot be operated by most people however, and currently, the only person who can is the Moon Angel Troupe's Milfeulle Sakuraba. Since the operation of the hub involves opening gates between different dimensions, those with the ability to do so are called "gate keepers". The new Rune Angel Troupe features Emblem Frames from NEUE and is the successor to the now disbanded Moon Angel Troupe.

== Anime ==
Galaxy Angel Rune (ギャラクシーエンジェる〜ん, Gyarakushī Enjerūn Run) is the anime counterpart to the Galaxy Angel II games. As with the first Galaxy Angel anime series, this one has little to nothing to do with the plot of the video games.

1° Launch! Angels Scramble-Rune
2° Super Cheap! Ground Bazaar-Rune
3° Legendary! Food Stash Survival-Rune
4° Temptation! Three o'clock Cafe Table-Rune
5° Truce! Adult's Alcohol-Rune
6° Debut! New Idol-Rune
7° Battle! Senior Is a Rival-Rune
8° Horrible! Rainy Day Call-Rune
9° Luxury! Celebrity's Way Travel-Rune
10° Attack! Combat Professional-Rune
11° Solved! A Detective's Case File-Rune
12° Boiling! Hot Spring Commercial-Rune
13° Now Appearing! Evil-Rune Angel Troupe?!

== Characters ==
For information on the characters of Galaxy Angel II, see Galaxy Angel II characters.

== Games ==
=== Galaxy Angel II: Zettai Ryōiki no Tobira ===
Galaxy Angel II: Zettai Ryōiki no Tobira
- Developer: BROCCOLI
- Platform: PlayStation 2
- Release: 22 June 2006
- Genre: Dating Sim/Strategy Game
- Mode: Single player

The first game, Zettai Ryōiki no Tobira (絶対領域の扉), can be translated as "Door to the Absolute Area". Four years have passed since the heroe Tact Meyers and the Moon Angels defeated the Val Fask's ambition in the previous game. Now it has been found a new universe called "NEUE" and a new angel-team (all of them having some connection with the previous characters) has been formed to protect it from Verel, their new enemy, who will kidnap Milfeulle Sakuraba "the gate keeper" who is the one who can open the gate to ABSOLUTE. Most of the major cast from the original Galaxy Angel games make appearances in this game. Tact will be the new commander of Luxiole in spite of to leave as new commander of Elle Ciel to Lester Cooldaras and the new team will be led by Kazuya Shiranami the new male member.

On release, Famitsu magazine scored the game a 29 out of 40.

==== Theme Songs ====
- Opening Theme side M: "Wing of Destiny"

Artist: Maho Tomita
Lyrics/Composition/Arrangement: Noriyasu Agematsu

- Opening Theme side H: "Eternal Love 2006"

Artist: Hironobu Kageyama
Lyrics: Yuki Mori
Composition/Arrangement: Yūsuke Sakamoto

- Ending Theme: "Cause your love ~Shiroi melody~"

Artist: Hiromi Satō
Lyrics: Bee'
Composition/Arrangement: Tatsuya Nishiwaki

=== Galaxy Angel II: Mugen Kairō no Kagi ===
Galaxy Angel II: Mugen Kairō no Kagi
- Developer: BROCCOLI
- Platform: PlayStation 2
- Release: 18 October 2007
- Genre: Dating Sim/Strategy Game
- Mode: Single player

The second game, Mugen Kairō no Kagi (無限回廊の鍵), can be translated as "The Key to the Infinite Corridor". Set six months after the previous game, a new federation has been established called UPW (United Parallel World). Tact Meyers has been promoted to a higher level and the Luxiole have a new commander, Coco Nutmilk, assisted by Tapio Ca. A new Rune Angel is introduced (similar to "Galaxy Angel Moonlit Lovers"), as well as other new members, and brief appearances of scenes with some of the previous characters. In the game, the Rune Angel-tai will have to fight against the Arms Alliance, which is brought together by the Three Marquis and, later, against "Parfait" the main villain.

==== Theme Songs ====
- Opening Theme Ver.M: "Wing of Destiny ~Angel harp arr.~"

Artist: Maho Tomita
Lyrics/Composition: Noriyasu Agematsu
Arrangement: Hitoshi Fujima

- Opening Theme Ver.R: "Eternal Love 2007"

Artist: Ryoko Shintani
Lyrics: Yuki Mori
Composition/Arrangement: Yūsuke Sakamoto

- Ending Theme: "Salvage"

Artist: JAM Project featuring Rica Matsumoto & Masami Okui
Lyrics: Masami Okui
Composer: Monta
Arrangement: Daisuke Kikuta

=== Galaxy Angel II: Eigō Kaiki no Toki ===
Galaxy Angel II: Eigō Kaiki no Toki
- Developer: BROCCOLI
- Platform: PlayStation 2
- Release: 12 March 2009
- Genre: Dating Sim/Strategy Game
- Mode: Single player

The third game, Eigō Kaiki no Toki (永劫回帰の刻), can be translated as "Eternal Recurrence of the Moment"

==== Theme Songs ====
- Opening Theme Type H: "Taiyō no Aria"

Artist: Hiromi Satō
Lyrics/Composition: Noriyasu Agematsu
Arrangement: Kikuta Daisuke

- Opening Theme Type Y: "Gessei no Canon"

Artist: Yui Sakakibara
Lyrics: Noriyasu Agematsu
Composition/Arrangement: Hitoshi Fujima

- Ending Theme: "Wing of Destiny" Rune-Angel ver.

Artist: Rune-Angel
Lyrics/Composition: Noriyasu Agematsu
Arrangement: Kikuta Daisuke

== Manga ==
Galaxy Angel 3rd, published in Comi Digi +

Title	Volume	Release date JP	Cover JP	Release date USA	Cover USA
Galaxy Angel II (3rd)	1	June 21, 2006	Apricot Sakuraba	January 26, 2007	Apricot Sakuraba & Milfeulle Sakuraba
Galaxy Angel II (3rd)	2	October 21, 2006	Kahlua/Tequila Marjoram	May 8, 2007	Apricot Sakuraba & Nano-Nano Pudding
Galaxy Angel II (3rd)	3	April 21, 2007	Nano-Nano Pudding	October 28, 2007	Apricot Sakuraba & Kahlua Marjoram
Galaxy Angel II (3rd)	4	October 18, 2007	Anise Azeat	N/Y	
Galaxy Angel II (3rd)	5	June 21, 2008	Lily C. Sherbet	N/Y	
Galaxy Angel II (3rd)	6	November 21, 2008	Apricot Sakuraba & Mimoza Fleur	N/Y	

Several years have passed since Milfeulle Sakuraba and the other lovely ladies of the Angel Troupe finally defeated Eonia's forces in EDEN. A new galaxy called NEUE is found, and though the troupe has officially disbanded, each of the former members works for the expansion into NEUE. Milfeulle is now the lone gatekeeper of the intergalactic "gate" that connects EDEN and NEUE. It's rumored that other gates and gatekeepers exist, and a new troupe has formed to hunt them down. Led by Kazuya Shiranami, the first male Angel, and Milfeulle's younger sister Apricot, the Rune Angel Troupe prepares for the mission to connect the two dimensions.

Due to Broccoli Books closing its doors in 2008, volumes 4–6 were never released in America.
