= Galaxy Angel =

Japanese media franchise

- Cover of the first Galaxy Angel game

ギャラクシーエンジェル (Gyarakushī Enjeru)
- Genre: Comedy, science fiction
- Created by: Broccoli
- Anime television series
- Directed by: Morio Asaka; Yoshimitsu Ōhashi; Shigehito Takayanagi
- Written by: Toshiki Inoue
- Music by: Masumi Itō
- Studio: Madhouse
- Licensed by: NA: Nozomi Entertainment
- Original network: Animax, TVO, TV Tokyo, TVh, TVA, TSC, TVQ, BBC
- English network: PH: AXN-Asia, Animax, Q, HERO; SEA: Animax; US: Starz
- Original run: 7 April 2001 – 29 September 2004
- Episodes: 126
- Manga
- Written by: Broccoli
- Illustrated by: Kanan
- Published by: Broccoli; JIVE; Kadokawa Shoten; Fujimi Shobo
- Magazine: Comic Rush, Dragon Junior, Dragon Age
- Original run: 27 April 2001 – 27 March 2004
- Volumes: 8
- Novel

Galaxy Angel 1
- Written by: Ryō Mizuno
- Illustrated by: Jūsensha Kōbō
- Published by: Fujimi Shobo
- Imprint: Fujimi Fantasia Bunko
- Published: November 2002
- Novel

Galaxy Angel EX
- Written by: Ryō Mizuno
- Illustrated by: Jūsensha Kōbō
- Published by: Fujimi Shobo
- Imprint: Fujimi Fantasia Bunko
- Published: July 2003
- Video game

Galaxy Angel EX
- Developer: Broccoli
- Publisher: Broccoli
- Genre: Minigame collection, visual novel
- Platform: Windows
- Released: 29 July 2005
- Video game

CR Galaxy Angel
- Developer: Broccoli
- Publisher: Taiyo Elec
- Genre: Pachinko
- Platform: PlayStation 2
- Released: 27 November 2008
- Sequel
- Galaxy Angel II
- icon

Galaxy Angel (Japanese: ギャラクシーエンジェル, Hepburn: Gyarakushī Enjeru) is a bishōjo sci-fi metaseries composed of anime, manga and dating sim video games. It was created by Broccoli in July 2000, when it launched a multi-platformed project called Project G.A. The anime and Galaxy Angel Party manga comprise a comedy story in an alternate universe, while the games and the regular manga have a serious romance and action plot.

A sequel game trilogy, Galaxy Angel II, was released from 2006 to 2009 and stars an entirely new cast, the "Rune Angel Troupe", and a new feature that combines the new Brave Heart frame with any of the Angels. Each of the Rune Angels has a connection to one of the Galaxy Angels, such as Apricot Sakuraba, the younger sister of Milfeulle Sakuraba. Just like the original Galaxy Angel, the Galaxy Angel II series has a manga adaptation and comedic anime spinoff.

The success of the video game and anime series influenced the creation of a manga series based on the video game universe. In Japan, the series became so popular that a musical based on the series was made. Entitled "GALAXY ANGEL ~The Musical~", it debuted in March and December 2005, and featured cast members who also worked on Galaxy Angel II.

== Plot ==
The girls of Galaxy Angel as seen in the anime series. From left to right: Vanilla H, Mint Blancmanche, Forte Stollen, Ranpha Franboise, Milfeulle Sakuraba

Commander Takuto Meyers is a commander of the 2nd Frontier Fleet, when exiled Prince Eonia launches his coup, Most of the Royal Family on the homeworld were killed via orbital bombardment, and large portions of the Imperial Fleet were destroyed in the surprise attack. As Commander Meyers is unable to contact 2nd Fleet HQ, he waits on standby for orders, until three members of the Angel Wing arrive, with a large fleet chasing them, which turns out to be unmanned ships. After destroying the fleet, Meyers takes his fleet and follows them back to where the Elsior is hiding, the battleship usually used only by the Imperial Guards for ceremonies and meets his old Instructor Lufte, now Commodore, who charges Meyers with commanding the Elsior and the Angel Wing in escorting Prince Shiva, the only survivor of the Royal Family, to the Rhombe system where loyalist forces are gathering for a counter offensive as the 2nd fleet has already been destroyed. Before the engines can be repaired however, more enemy ships arrive, and rather than risking discovery, Commodore Lufte takes command of the remaining fleet and draws the enemy ships away, while the Elsior remains and makes its way to Rhombe, fighting off enemy attacks along the way, including elements of the Imperial Fleet changed sides to side with Prince Eonia.

While attempting to meet up with the 3rd fleet stationed at Rhombe, the Elsior discovers destroyed remnants of the 3rd fleet and runs into a trap by Prince Eonia's main fleet. While fighting the forces, they receive another message from the 3rd fleet with a new rendezvous point, after fighting their way through the enemy fleet to the rendezvous point, allied reinforcements arrive and force the enemy forces to retreat, Commodore Lufte having evaded enemy forces and reached the Rhombe System ahead of the Elsior. Afterwards, the Loyalist fleet launches an operation to destroy Prince Eonia's main fleet at the Nadler system, and they inflict a serious defeat on the enemy and the commanding admirals (and other high-ranking officers of the Imperial Navy) decide to hold a ball in Prince Shiva's honour, and plan to transfer Meyers away to command another fleet while the Angel Wings and the Elsior remain behind to guard Prince Shiva on Fargo, an orbital city around the planet Rhombe. On a routine visit to the ship's hangar, Meyers bumps into a strange girl called Noah, who wants Meyers to give him one of the Emblem Frames. When Meyers refuses, Noah gets angry, says that she will make more and stronger ones, and runs off, disappearing just around the corner. Shrugging the incident off, Meyers takes his chosen love with him to the ball, and while there Prince Eonia shows up with several soldiers to try and take Prince Shiva into his Custody, although Prince Shiva refuses. Shots are fired, and it is revealed that Prince Eonia and the soldiers are just holograms and are not physically present, at this point Eonia's fleet launches a sneak attack while most of the Loyalist fleet is docked and not combat ready, and inflicts serious damage on the port facilities.

Meyers heads back to the ship with Prince Shiva, and after the enemy fleet retreats, the Black Moon, an identical counterpart to the White Moon (a planet sized structure) shows up and fires a massive laser that slices Rhombe in half and destroys much of Fargo and the Loyalist fleet. Meyers and the Angel Wing fight a desperate battle to reach the Black Moon, which is constantly producing attack satellites and unmanned ships, before Noah unleashes an EMP like blast that leaves the Elsior, the Emblem Frames and the Loyalist Fleet powerless except for sensors and communications, before attacking them as they lay helpless. While the situation looks grim, suddenly the Elsior and the Emblem Frames have their power restored to above their original levels, and the Emblem Frames all grow wings. They manage to break through the defensive line and damage the Black Moon which causes Prince Eonia to back off for now, turning it into a stalemate, although afterwards the Emblem Frames lose their wings and their power levels drop to below normal.

As the loyalist fleet gathers on the other side of Rhombe, Commodore Lufte takes command as everyone higher-ranking was MIA and presumed dead. Elsior's chief engineer, Creta and Prince Shiva shed some light on the abilities of the Elsior and the Emblem Frames, and also that there is a weapon possibly capable of destroying the Black Moon, but it is stored in the White Moon. While briefing Commodore Lufte on the situation, he mentions that Noah was spotted on other ships and the port facilities before the attack, although when guards attempted to question her, she disappeared into smoke right before their eyes. The Elsior and the Loyalist fleet then head to the White Moon in order to retrieve the weapon, as Sherry, Prince Eonia's second in command, tries to stop them along the way, but fails, finally sacrificing herself as she tries to ram her flagship into the Elsior, although the Angel Wing manages to destroy her ship just before impact. At the White Moon, Lady Shatoyan, the Holy Mother of the White Moon, reveals that the White Moon is a weapons producing factory just like the Black Moon, but the people who found the White Moon decided to keep it a secret, and only use the technology there for good. Lady Shatoyan then lifts the limiters on the Emblem Frames and installs the Chrono Break Canon on the Elsior.

In the Final Battle, after defeating the Hell Hounds, Prince Eonia's elite fighter wing piloting copied Emblem Frames, Noah causes their frames to grow wings as well by altering their structure, in the process causing the fighters to consume their pilots and turn them into soulless zombies. After destroying their fighters, the Elsior gets into position and destroys Prince Eonia's flagship with the Chrono Break Canon, after which Noah reveals that Noah was just a form used to trick Prince Eonia, whom wanted to use the Lost Technology to create an age of peace and prosperity for everyone, into launching his coup so that the Black Moon could unite with the White Moon and evolve further. While the Black Moon pulls the White Moon out of orbit in an attempt to unite with it, Meyers and the Angel Wing breaks through a large screen of attack satellites to use the Chrono Break Canon on the Black Moon, but before it can finish charging, the Black Moon brings the full weight of its power on them, disabling them, all except for the Emblem Frame piloted by Meyer's chosen heroine.

== Media ==
=== Anime ===
The Galaxy Angel anime series, produced by Broccoli, Madhouse and Bandai Visual, premiered across Japan on Animax between 7 April 2001 to 29 September 2001, and was soon followed by numerous sequels, including a second series ("Z"), a third series ("A", "AA", and "S") and a fourth ("X"). Each broadcast is made up of two 15-minute episodes, whose titles always contain references to food. The first series was broadcast by Animax, while later series have been broadcast by TV Osaka and other TXN stations. Internationally, the series has been broadcast by Animax and its respective networks worldwide, including its English language networks in Southeast Asia and South Asia, and its other networks in Hong Kong, Taiwan, South Korea and Latin America. In the US, this series was distributed on DVD by Bandai Entertainment, and later on Blu-ray by Nozomi Entertainment.

=== Manga ===
Unlike the anime, the manga version of Galaxy Angel deals with the battles against The Legitimate Transbaal Empire (Eonia's Rebel Forces), and the relationship between Takuto Mayers and the six Galaxy Angel members. All Galaxy Angel books were published in North America by Broccoli Books.

Title (JP / US)	#	Release date JP	Release date US
Galaxy Angel	1	December 2001	March 3, 2004
Galaxy Angel	2	September 2002	May 19, 2004
Galaxy Angel	3	March 2003	July 25, 2004
Galaxy Angel	4	November 2003	January 12, 2005
Galaxy Angel	5	July 2004	April 25, 2005
Galaxy Angel 2nd / Galaxy Angel Beta	1	December 2004	November 2, 2005
Galaxy Angel 2nd / Galaxy Angel Beta	2	July 2005	March 15, 2006
Galaxy Angel 2nd / Galaxy Angel Beta	3	October 2005	August 16, 2006
Galaxy Angel Parody / Galaxy Angel Party	1	February 2003	July 27, 2005
Galaxy Angel Parody / Galaxy Angel Party	2	July 2003	January 25, 2006
Galaxy Angel Parody / Galaxy Angel Party	3	July 2004	October 4, 2006

=== Games ===
The video games are part strategy game, part dating sim, and are all available for the PC and PlayStation 2, with the first one also being available on the original Xbox. The three games in the series are titled Galaxy Angel, Moonlit Lovers and Eternal Lovers. All versions of the story are centered around Takuto Meyers, commander of the 2nd Frontier Fleet. Moonlit Lovers received a PC expansion that added a new character and story plot to tie her into the main game, based on the expanded PS2 port. Eternal Lovers also received a fan disc called Galaxy Angel EX. A pachinko simulation game for PlayStation 2, CR Galaxy Angel, was released in 2008.

A sequel series to the original trilogy, Galaxy Angel II, came out exclusively on the PS2 and followed a different cast of characters. The three games in the sequel series are called Galaxy Angel II: Zettai Ryouiki no Tobira, Galaxy Angel II: Mugen Kairou no Kagi, and Galaxy Angel II: Eigou Kaiki no Toki, released in that order.

==== Galaxy Angel ====
In the video game universe, the Galaxy Angels are from the "Special Guardian Division" and they work closely with the "Imperial Special Guards" and the "Satellite Defense Teams". They are the guardians of the White Moon, the sacred planet of the Transbaal Empire, and the personal protectors of the White Moon Goddess Shatoyan. The story begins with Prince Eonia attempting a take over of the Transbaal Empire with the aid of the mysterious Black Moon, counterpart to the White Moon. To counter Prince Eonia, the Angel-tai along with their flagship the Elsior are placed in the hands of the kind and ever-capable Commander Takuto Meyers. In addition to the storyline differences, the personalities of the characters were also altered significantly for the anime, and the video games offer a much more in-depth look into the Galaxy Angel universe.

The following endings assume that Transvaal remains an empire, if the player tells Prince Shiva the truth at the beginning of the game, buys him a chess set and spends time with him, it is possible to unlock the Prince Shiva subplot, and at the end of the game Prince Shiva gives up the throne and Commodore Luft is elected President of the Republic instead.

- Milfeulle Sakuraba: Makes a wish to the Emblem Frame that she will give up her life as the Goddess of Luck in order to restore power to the Elsior, which destroys the Black Moon with the Chrono Break Canon. Meyers retires from the navy to lead a peaceful life with Milfeulle, who has lost the ability to pilot Emblem Frames as well as her legendary luck (both good and bad), while Lester leads the Frontier Research Team to find remnants of Eonia's fleet and any Lost Technology like the Black Moon
- Ranpha: As the Elsior starts going down in flames, Ranpha finds her resolve and destroys all the enemies, clearing a path for the Elsior which destroys the Black Moon with the Chrono Break Canon. Meyers stays in the military as head of the Frontier Research Team, and leaves with Ranpha on the Elsior, who starts redecorating the ship as their home.
- Mint: The communication system goes down on the Elisor but Mint and Meyers understood each other due to their feelings. The Elisor is heavily damaged but Meyers decides to trust Mint and charge through and destroy the Black Moon with the Chrono Break Cannon while Mint destroys all the surrounding enemies with her Emblem Frame's "Flier Dance" ability. Mint decides to quit the Angel Troupe to accompany Meyers on his mission to scout the Frontier.
- Forte: Destroys all the enemies in front of the Elsior, allowing it to destroy the Black Moon with the Chrono Break Canon. Meyers becomes commander of the frontier research team, and Forte becomes his new adjutant, replacing Lester.
- Vanilla: Uses her Emblem Frame's nanomachines to restore full functionality to the Elsior, allowing it to destroy the Black Moon with the Chrono Break Canon. Meyers become commander of the Frontier Research Team, and Vanilla accompanies him on the Elsior, by now largely having gotten over her past and become more cheerful.

==== Galaxy Angel: Moonlit Lovers ====
The second game in the trilogy, Moonlit Lovers, revolves around the battles with remnants of Eonia's forces led by General Rezum and later a mysterious woman named Nephilia who claimed to be a member of a race called the Val-Fasq. A new member of the Angel-tai, Karasuma Chitose, is also introduced. The relationship between Takuto and whichever Angel whose heart he won is explored as well.

==== Galaxy Angel: Eternal Lovers ====
In the final game, Eternal Lovers, the war with the Val-Fasq begins in earnest while a couple of refugees from the legendary EDEN (the place origin of both the White Moon and Black Moon) arrive to beg the Transbaal Empire (and the legendary hero Takuto Meyers) for help. Takuto and his Angel's relationship is also put into serious jeopardy as his duties preparing for the war with the Val-Fasq keep them apart with increasing frequency.

Players can go through the story in the adventure mode and play real time tactics battle missions in the name of Takuto Mayers. While having good relationship with the Angel Troupe can increase their battle ability and the Angel Troupe with the best relation with Takuto will be with Takuto in the end like the previous two Galaxy Angel games. In this game, the cleared character would relate to the shooting mode of the game and her own Angel Frame would be unlocked in the shooting mode. Players can replay the game's battles piloting the Angel Frame instead of being the commander in chief of the battle. (while players are still given the option to command other fighters at the same time without the free camera mode.)

=== Light novels ===
Two light novels by Ryō Mizuno (the second cowritten with Megumi Tsuge) have been released in the Galaxy Angel series:

1. Galaxy Angel 1 (ギャラクシーエンジェル 1, Gyarakushī Enjeru 1) (November 2002, Fujimi Shobo, ISBN 4829114762)
  - A revised version, Galaxy Angel: Return of the Former Crown Prince (ギャラクシーエンジェル〜廃太子の帰還〜, Gyarakushī Enjeru: Haitaishi no Kikan) was published by Kadokawa Shoten on March 25, 2006 (ISBN 4047072044)
2. Galaxy Angel EX (ギャラクシーエンジェル EX, Gyarakushī Enjeru Īekusu) (July 2003, Fujimi Shobo, ISBN 482911536X)

== Other media ==
	Date
GALAXY ANGEL ~The Musical~	16 March 2005
GALAXY ANGEL ~Re-Mix~	7 December 2005

Galaxy Angel Live was performed on March 16, 2005. Performers are completely different from the voice actors because some of them were unable to participate. There was also another show in 2005, from December 7 to 11.

=== Soundtracks ===
Galaxy Angel Theme songs

- Opening theme: "Eternal love" ~Hikari no Tenshi~ (Eternal Love ~From Angels of Light~)

Artist: Mari Iijima
Lyrics: Yuki Mori
Music: Yuusuke Sakamoto

- Ending theme: "Tenshi-tachi no Kyuusoku" (Angels' Holiday)

Artist: Mari Iijima
Songwriting: Mari Iijima
Arrangement: Yuusuke Sakamoto

Galaxy Angel Moonlit Lovers theme/insert songs

Theme songs:

- Opening theme: "Eternal Love 2003"

Artist: Mari Iijima
Lyrics: Yuki Mori
Music: Yuusuke Sakamoto

- Ending theme: "Tenshi-tachi no Kyuusoku" (Angels' Holiday)

Artist: Mari Iijima
Songwriting: Mari Iijima
Arrangement: Yuusuke Sakamoto

Insert songs:

- Theme: "Eternal Love" ~The angel of light Squadron Version~

Artist: Angel-tai
Lyrics: Yuki Mori
Music: Yuusuke Sakamoto

Galaxy Angel External lovers theme songs

The opening and ending theme is sung by the famous singer Hiromi Satō, known to be moved by the songs and wept during singing through the recording sessions.

- Opening theme: "Angelic Symphony"

Artist: Hiromi Satō
Songwriting: Noriyasu Agematsu
Arranger: Masashi Huzima

- Ending theme PC ver.: "Eternal Love 2004"

Artist: Hiromi Satou
Lyrics: Yuki Mori
Music: Yuusuke Sakamoto

- Ending theme PS2 ver.: "Owarinaki Prelude" (Neverending Prelude)

Artist: Hiromi Satō
Songwriting: Noriyasu Agematsu
Arranger: Fujita, Hitoshi Makoto
