= Blossom (disambiguation) =

A blossom is the flower of stone fruit trees and some other small plants.

Blossom(s) may also refer to:

== Places ==
- Blossom, New York, United States, an unincorporated hamlet
- Blossom, Texas, United States, a town
- Cape Blossom, Alaska, United States
- Blossom Point, Wrangel Island, Russia

== People ==
- Blossom (given name)
- Blossom (surname)
- Blümchen (Jasmin Wagner), German singer who uses the name Blossom when singing in English

== Arts and entertainment ==
=== Fictional characters ===
- Blossom, in the American animated series Little Mouse on the Prairie
- Blossom Jackson, from the BBC soap opera EastEnders
- Blossom Russo, the titular character in the 1990s American sitcom Blossom
- Blossom (The Powerpuff Girls), in the American animated series The Powerpuff Girls
  - Blossom (Momoko Akatsutsumi), in the Japanese anime series Powerpuff Girls Z
- Cheryl Blossom, in the Archie Comics universe
- Princess Blossom Pepper-Doodle Von Yum Yum, Aka Blossom, from Fetch! With Ruff Ruffman
- Cure Blossom, magical girl alias of Tsubomi Hanasaki in HeartCatch PreCure!

=== Literature ===
- Blossom (novel), a 1990 novel by Andrew Vachss
- "The Blossom", a poem by William Blake, published in 1789

=== Music ===
- Blossoms (band), a rock band from Stockport, England
- The Blossoms, a backing singing group who achieved their greatest success in the 1960s
- Blossom (Frank Carter & the Rattlesnakes album), 2015
- Blossom (Milky Chance album), 2017
- Blossom (Doh Kyung-soo EP), 2024
- Blossom (Laboum EP), 2021
- "Blossom" (Kerli song), 2016
- "Blossom", a song by James Taylor from Sweet Baby James, 1970
- "Blossom", a song by Porter Robinson from Nurture, 2021
- "Blossom", a song by Parannoul from After the Magic, 2023
- "Moon/Blossom", a song by Ayumi Hamasaki, 2010

=== Television ===
- Blossom (American TV series), a 1990s American sitcom
- Blossom (Chinese TV series), a 2024 Chinese television drama series
- Blossom (Japanese TV series), a 2026 Japanese television drama series
- Blossoms Shanghai, also called Blossoms, a 2023 Chinese television series directed by Wong Kar-wai

== Events ==
- Blossom Cup, a professional tennis tournament for women held annually in Quanzhou, China, since 2009
- Blossom Festival, an annual music festival of orchestral music at the Blossom Music Center
- Blossom Kite Festival, formerly the Smithsonian Kite Festival, an annual event held in Washington, DC

== Facilities ==
- Blossom Athletic Center, San Antonio, Texas
- Blossom Music Center, Cuyahoga Falls, Ohio

== Mathematics ==
- Blossom (functional), a functional for polynomials
- Blossom (graph theory), a subgraph in which removing any vertex leaves a graph with a perfect matching

== Military ==
- HMS Blossom, three Royal Navy ships
- Operation Priha (Blossom), a series of Israeli operations during the War of Attrition

== Other uses ==
- Blossom (brig), a British brig
