= Blossom (given name) =

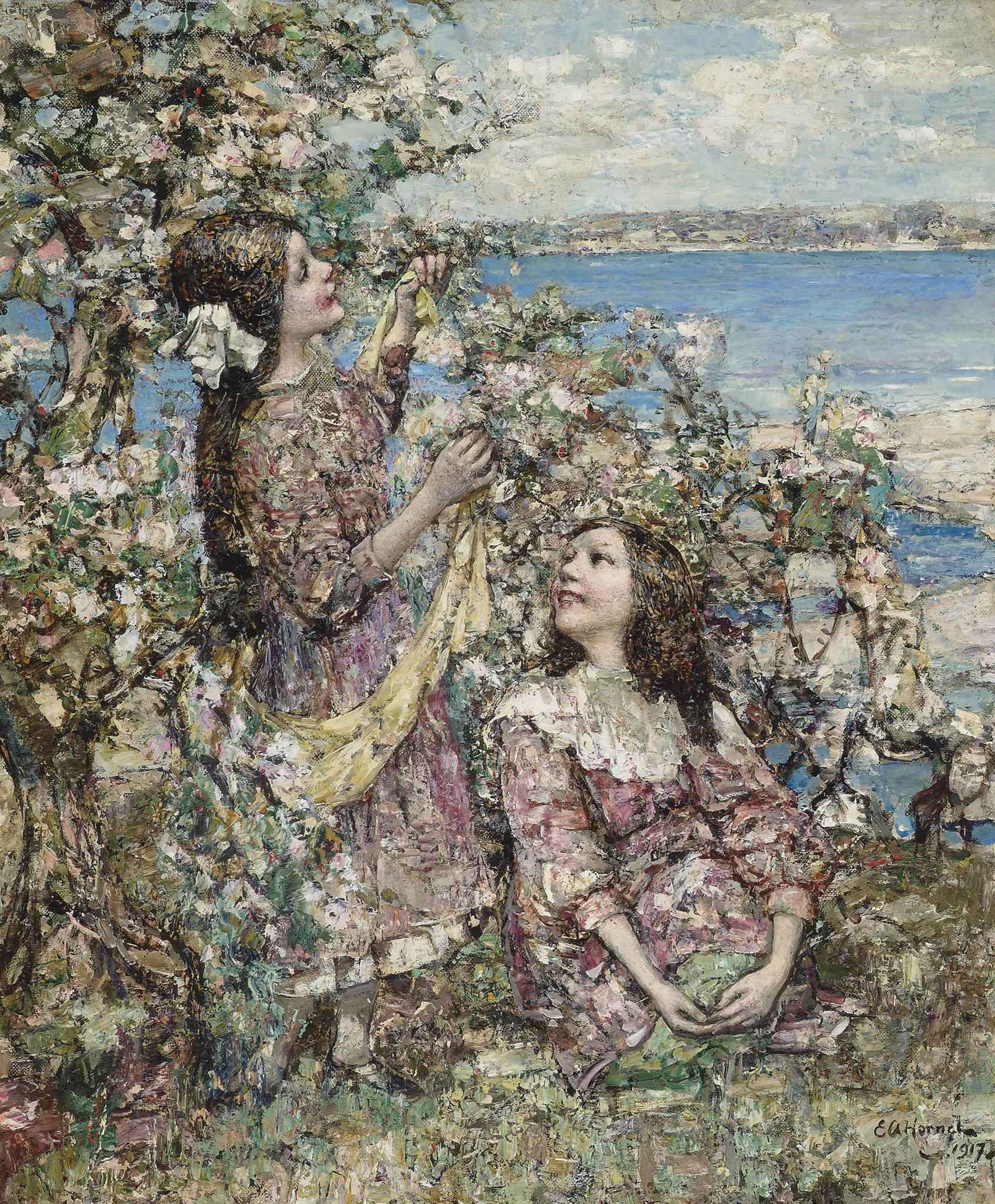
- Amidst the Spring Blossom by Edward Atkinson Hornel, 1917.
- Gender: Feminine
- Language: English

Origin
- Meaning: "Flower”

Other names
- Related names: Tsveta

Blossom is an English feminine given name derived from the Old English word blōstm, meaning "flower". It is an English term of endearment for a young girl. It has been in occasional use throughout the Anglosphere since the late 19th century and is one of many botanical names that came into fashion during the Victorian era. Blossom is also a surname.

== Women ==
- Blossom Caldarone (born 1999), English musician
- Blossom Caron (born Brenda Harding; 1905–1999), Canadian photographer
- Blossom Champlain, feminist scholar
- Blossom Damania, American virologist
- Blossom Dearie (1924–2009), American jazz singer and pianist
- Blossom Elfman, American novelist
- Blossom Maduafokwa (born 1970), Nigerian public health physician
- Blossom Puanani Alama-Tom (born 1930), Hawaiian musician and entertainer
- Amelia Blossom Pegram (1935–2022), South African writer and performer
- Blossom Rock (born McDonald; 1895–1978), American actress
- Blossom Seeley (born Minnie Guyer; 1886–1974), American singer, dancer, and actress
- Blossom Tainton-Lindquist (born 1962), Swedish singer, dancer, publisher, fitness coach and personal trainer
- Blossom Wigdor (1924–2025), Canadian clinical psychologist and gerontologist

== Nickname ==
- Maxine Blossom Miles (1901–1984), British aviation engineer, socialite, businesswoman, engraver, costume designer, and gardener

== Men ==
- Blossom Chukwujekwu (born Chukwudi Echezona Chukwujekwu in 1983), Nigerian actor

== Fictional characters ==
- Blossom, in the American animated series Little Mouse on the Prairie
- Blossom Jackson, character from the BBC soap opera EastEnders
- Blossom, from Fetch! With Ruff Ruffman
- Blossom Russo, the titular character in the 1990s American sitcom Blossom
- Blossom (The Powerpuff Girls), in the American animated series The Powerpuff Girls
- Blossom (Momoko Akatsutsumi), in the Japanese anime series Powerpuff Girls Z
- Blossom, one-off character from the animated series Rob the Robot
