= Ezinne =

Igbo name and title

- Gender: Female
- Language: Igbo

Origin
- Origin: Igbo
- Meaning: True mother
- Region of origin: Igboland

Other names
- Related names: Nneoma

Ezinne // is a feminine Igbo name of South Eastern Nigeria. It means "true mother".

It is also otherwise used as a chieftaincy title for Igbo women in the region.

== Notable people with the name Ezinne ==
- Ezinne Kalu, Nigerian basketball player
- Ezinne Okparaebo, Norwegian sprinter
- Ezinne Akudo, Nigerian lawyer and beauty pageant title holder
- Ezinne Ukagwu, Nigerian economist
