= List of shipwrecks in October 1863 =

The list of shipwrecks in October 1863 includes ships sunk, foundered, grounded, or otherwise lost during October 1863.

== 1 October ==
List of shipwrecks: 1 October 1863
| Ship | State | Description |
|---|---|---|
| Caspar | United States | The barque foundered in the Atlantic Ocean. Her crew were rescued by the schooner Transit (United Kingdom). Caspar was on a voyage from a port in Chile to New York. |
| Eliza | United Kingdom | The brig ran aground on the Longsand, in the North Sea off the coast of Essex. She floated off and sank. Her crew were rescued by the smack Marco Polo (United Kingdom). Eliza was on a voyage from South Shields, County Durham to London. |
| Iö | United Kingdom | The snow ran aground on the Ridges, in the Bristol Channel and was wrecked. Her crew survived. She was on a voyage from Llanelly, Glamorgan to Dieppe, Seine-Inférieure, France. |
| Wanderer | United Kingdom | The ship was driven on to the North Rock, in the Belfast Lough. She was on a voyage from Liverpool, Lancashire to Demerara, British Guiana. |

== 2 October ==
List of shipwrecks: 2 October 1863
| Ship | State | Description |
|---|---|---|
| Antelope | United Kingdom | The ship foundered in the Atlantic Ocean 50 nautical miles (93 km) west of Ouessant, Finistère, France. Her crew were rescued by Jane Elizabeth (United Kingdom). Antelope was on a voyage from Pomeron, Portugal to Newcastle upon Tyne, Northumberland. |
| Ganjam | United Kingdom | The ship ran aground in the Hooghly River. She was on a voyage from Calcutta, Indian to Mauritius. She was refloated on 9 October. |
| Northbound | United Kingdom | The ship ran aground on a reef off "Bontan Island". She was refloated with assistance from HMS Alecto (Royal Navy) and towed in to Singapore, Straits Settlements in a waterlogged condition. |
| Robert McKenzie | United Kingdom | The full-rigged ship ran aground in the Hooghly River. She was on a voyage from Calcutta to Liverpool, Lancashire. She was refloated and put back to Calcutta. |
| Royal Tar | United Kingdom | The ship was wrecked at Scalloway, Shetland Islands. She was on a voyage from Lerwick, Shetland Islands to London. |
| Standard | United Kingdom | The ship was abandoned in the Atlantic Ocean. All on board were rescued. She was on a voyage from Belfast, County Antrim to Miramichi, New Brunswick, British North America. |
| Unnamed | United Kingdom | The sloop sank in Liverpool Bay. |

== 3 October ==
List of shipwrecks: 3 October 1863
| Ship | State | Description |
|---|---|---|
| Allport | United Kingdom | The ship ran aground on the Holm Sand, in the North Sea off the coast of Suffolk. She was on a voyage from Sunderland, County Durham to London. She was refloated with the assistance of a tug and towed in to Lowestoft, Suffolk in a waterlogged condition. |
| Antelope | United Kingdom | The brigantine was abandoned in the Atlantic Ocean 50 nautical miles (93 km) west of Ouessant, Finistère, France. Her five crew were rescued by the brig St. Jean (France). Antelope was on a voyage from Pomaron, Portugal to Newcastle upon Tyne, Northumberland. |
| Cambridge | United Kingdom | The ship ran aground on the Blacktail Sand, in the North Sea off the coast of Essex. She was on a voyage from Sunderland, County Durham to London. She was refloated and resumed her voyage. |
| Dilston | United Kingdom | The barque was damaged by fire at North Shields, Northumberland. |
| Essex | Stralsund | The full-rigged ship was lost at the mouth of the Mutlah River, India. Her crew survived. She was on a voyage from the Mutlah River to Falmouth, Cornwall, United Kingdom. |
| Gem | United Kingdom | The ship was driven ashore on Anholt, Denmark. Her crew survived. She was on a voyage from Kronstadt, Russia to Wisbech, Cambridgeshire. |

== 4 October ==
List of shipwrecks: 4 October 1863
| Ship | State | Description |
|---|---|---|
| Annsch | United Kingdom | The ship foundered in the Mediterranean Sea off Minorca, Spain. Her crew were rescued. She was on a voyage from Agrigento, Sicily, Italy to Falmouth, Cornwall. |
| Atalanta | United Kingdom | The ship was sighted whilst on a voyage from Liverpool, Lancashire to New York. No further trace, presumed foundered with the loss of all hands. |
| Catahoula | United States | American Civil War: The 227-ton sidewheel paddle steamer was burned by Confederate agents on the Mississippi River at St. Louis, Missouri. |
| Chancellor | United States | American Civil War: The 392-ton sidewheel paddle steamer was burned by Confederate agents on the Mississippi River at St. Louis, Missouri. |
| Cypress | United Kingdom | The ship was driven ashore at Diamond Point, Grand Bahama, Bahamas. She was on a voyage from Liverpool to Havana, Cuba. An attempt by USS Juniata (United States Navy) to tow her off failed and she became a wreck. |
| Experiment | Denmark | The galiot was driven ashore and wrecked at Scheveningen, South Holland, Netherlands. Her eight crew survived. She was on a voyage from Antwerp, Belgium to Newcastle upon Tyne, Northumberland, United Kingdom. |
| Forest Queen | United States | American Civil War: The 419-ton sidewheel paddle steamer was burned by Confederate agents on the Mississippi River at St. Louis, Missouri. |
| Ivanhoe | United Kingdom | The ship departed from Invercargill, New Zealand for Sydney, New South Wales. No further trace, presumed foundered with the loss of all hands. |
| Roman | United Kingdom | The brig was driven ashore at Huna, Caithness. She was on a voyage from Greenland to Fraserburgh, Aberdeenshire. |

== 5 October ==
List of shipwrecks: 5 October 1863
| Ship | State | Description |
|---|---|---|
| Concordia | United Kingdom | American Civil War, Union blockade: The blockade runner was burned by her crew on the Calcasieu River at Calcasieu Pass, Louisiana, Confederate States of America to prevent her capture by an armed cutter and gig from the gunboat USS Granite City (1863) (United States Navy). |
| Neptune | United Kingdom | The barque was wrecked on Scharhörn. Her crew were rescued. She was on a voyage from Sunderland, County Durham to Hamburg. |
| HMS Penguin | Royal Navy | The Philomel-class gunvessel was driven ashore at the Cape of Good Hope, Cape Colony. Subsequently refloated, repaired and returned to service. |
| Sir Colin Campbell | United Kingdom | The brig was driven ashore at Rye, Sussex. She was on a voyage from Newcastle upon Tyne, Northumberland to Havre de Grâce, Seine-Inférieure, France. She was refloated the next day and towed in to Rye. |

== 6 October ==
List of shipwrecks: 6 October 1863
| Ship | State | Description |
|---|---|---|
| Crescent | United Kingdom | The schooner was run into by a barque off Corsewall Point, Wigtownshire. She was taken in tow by the steamship Wolfe but consequently foundered. Her crew were rescued by Wolfe. . Crescen was on a voyage from Troon, Ayrshire to Cork. |
| Ekea Maria | Norway | The ship collided with Henriette (United Kingdom) in the North Sea off Borkum, Kingdom of Hanover and was abandoned by her crew, who were rescued by Henriette. Ekea Maria was on a voyage from Kristiansand to "Kleinsiel". She was towed in to Cuxhaven on 7 October by the steamship A'Olof (Flag unknown). |
| Ouse | United Kingdom | The steamship was damaged by fire at Copenhagen, Denmark. SHe was on a voyage from Hull, Yorkshire to Saint Petersburg, Russia. |
| Sarah Ann | United Kingdom | The schooner ran aground on the Shipwash Sand, in the North Sea off the coast of Suffolk. She was on a voyage from Sunderland, County Durham to Plymouth, Devon. She was refloated with the assistance of the smack Victoria (United Kingdom) and assisted in to Harwich, Essex. |
| Unnamed | Flag unknown | The brig was run into by the steamship Iron Duke (United Kingdom) and sank in the River Liffey. |

== 7 October ==
List of shipwrecks: 7 October 1863
| Ship | State | Description |
|---|---|---|
| Alexander | United Kingdom | The ship departed from Liverpool, Lancashire for Plymouth, Devon. No further trace, presumed foundered with the loss of all hands. |
| Ann and Margaret | United Kingdom | The ship struck the wreck of Karla (Bremen) off the South Foreland, Kent and was damaged. She was on a voyage from South Shields, County Durham to Nantes, Loire-Inférieure, France. She put in to Ramsgate, Kent. |
| Argus | Confederate States of America | American Civil War: The steamboat was captured and burned on the Red River of the South by a boat expedition from the monitor USS Osage (United States Navy). |
| Charles Whitley | United Kingdom | The ship sank in the River Dee. She was on a voyage from the River Dee to Barrow-in-Furness, Lancashire. |
| Charlotte | United Kingdom | The schooner was wrecked near Kilcoole, County Wicklow with the loss of all hands. |
| Estella | United Kingdom | The ship ran aground at Drogheda, County Louth. She wason a voyage from Liverpool, Lancashire to Drogheda. She was refloated and taken in to Drogheda in a leaky condition. |
| General Havelock, and Nelson | United Kingdom | The schooner General Havelock and the brigantine Nelson collided in the English Channel 6 nautical miles (11 km) off Beachy Head, Sussex. Both vessels were abandoned by their crews. General Havelock was on a voyage from London to Ryde, Isle of Wight. She was subsequently towed in to Newhaven, Sussex in a derelict condition. Nelson was on a voyage from Poole, Dorset to London. She consequently sank. |
| James | United Kingdom | The schooner collided with Zaide Celine (France and foundered off the coast of Cornwall with the loss of two of her crew. Survivors were rescued by Zaide Celine. |
| Mexico | Spain | Mexico The paddle steamer was destroyed by fire 40 nautical miles (74 km) off Cape San Antonio, Cuba with the loss of about 60 lives. Sixteen people were rescued. She was on a voyage from Sisal, Mexico to Havana, Cuba. |
| Pushmataha | Confederate States of America | American Civil War, Union blockade: Carrying a cargo consisting of claret, gunpowder, and a naval ram, the blockade runner was chased ashore on the coast of Louisiana off the Calcasieu River while trying to enter the Mermentau River. Her crew set her on fire and abandoned her, after which a boat crew from the gunboat USS Cayuga (United States Navy) boarded her, removed all of her cargo except two kegs of gunpowder, and blew her up. |
| Reine | France | The schooner ran aground on the Longsand, in the North Sea off the coast of Essex, United Kingdom. She was on a voyage from Warkworth, Northumberland, United Kingdom to Nantes, Loire-Inférieure. |
| Ringdove | United Kingdom | The schooner foundered 20 nautical miles (37 km) north east of the Copeland Islands, County Donegal. Her crew were rescued by the barque Immaculata (Italy). Ringdove was on a voyage from Troon, Ayrshire to Dundalk, County Louth. |
| Robert Fulton | Confederate States of America | American Civil War: The 158-ton sidewheel steamboat was captured on the Red River of the South by a boat expedition from the monitor USS Osage (United States Navy) and was burned at the river′s mouth. |
| Schnellpost | Stettin | The schooner collided with a barque and was abandoned in the Baltic Sea 5 nautical miles (9.3 km) off the Falsterbo Lighthouse, Sweden. She was on a voyage from Stettin to Newcastle upon Tyne, Northumberland. She was towed in to Wismar in a derelict condition on 10 October. |
| Sunshine | United Kingdom | The ship foundered in Liverpool Bay. Her crew were rescued. She was on a voyage from Barrow in Furness to Liverpool, Lancashire. |
| Susannah | United Kingdom | The ship foundered in Liverpool Bay. Her crew were rescued by the tug United States (United Kingdom). Susannah was on a voyage from Barrow-in-Furness to Liverpool, Lancashire. |
| Union | United Kingdom | The ship was driven ashore and wrecked at Dundalk, County Louth. Her crew were rescued by the Dundalk Lifeboat. She was on a voyage from Workington, Cumberland to Drogheda, County Louth. |
| Unidentified schooner | Flag unknown | American Civil War, Union blockade: The schooner was chased ashore on the coast of Louisiana off the Calcasieu River by a boat crew from the gunboat USS Cayuga (United States Navy). The schooner′s crew blew her up before the boat crew could board her. |

== 8 October ==
List of shipwrecks: 8 October 1863
| Ship | State | Description |
|---|---|---|
| Charm | United Kingdom | The schooner ran aground on the Swinebottoms, in the Baltic Sea. She was on a voyage from Buckie, Banffshire to Memel, Prussia. She was refloated and taken in to Helsingør, Denmark. |
| Farewell | United Kingdom | The schooner ran aground on the Swinebottoms. She was on a voyage from Liverpool, Lancashire to Lübeck. She was refloated and taken in to Helsingør. |
| Gilbert Munro | United Kingdom | The barque was wrecked on the Leman Sand, in the North Sea off the coast of Norfolk. Her crew were rescued. She was on a voyage from Kronstadt, Russia to London. She was refloated on 11 October and taken in tow by some smacks, but consequently sank 11 nautical miles (20 km) north west of the Dowsing Lightship ( Trinity House). |
| Joshua Carroll | United Kingdom | The ship was driven ashore and damaged at Teignmouth, Devon. She was refloated on 11 October and taken in to Teignmouth. |
| Need | United Kingdom | The ship sank at Cardiff, Glamorgan. She was on a voyage from Ardrossan, Ayrshire to Cardiff. |
| Porthcressa | United Kingdom | The ship ran aground in the Isles of Scilly. |
| Rudolph | United Kingdom | The ship ran aground on the Swinebottoms and sank. Her crew survived. She was on a voyage from Newcastle upon Tyne, Northumberland to Danzig. Rudolph was later refloated and taken in to Helsingør in a severely leaky condition. |
| Schyryd | United Kingdom | The ship ran aground at Teignmouth. |

== 9 October ==
List of shipwrecks: 9 October 1863
| Ship | State | Description |
|---|---|---|
| Bold Hunter | United States | American Civil War: The full-rigged ship, bound for Calcutta, India, from Dundee, Forfarshire, with a cargo of coal, was captured and burned in the Atlantic Ocean off the coast of French West Africa (19°N 21°W) by the merchant raider CSS Georgia (Confederate States Navy). |
| Ceres | United Kingdom | The ship ran aground at Bridport, Dorset and was wrecked. SHe was on a voyage from Newcastle upon Tyne, Northumberland to Bridport. |
| Faedernes Minde | Norway | The ship ran aground on the Longsand, in the North Sea off the coast of Essex, United Kingdom. She was on a voyage from Tønsberg to Rouen, Seine-Inférieure, France. She was refloated with the assistance of three smacks and assisted in to Harwich, Essex in a waterlogged condition. |
| Flowery Land | United Kingdom | The full-rigged ship was scuttled off the mouth of the River Plate after some of her crew had mutinied ad killed several officers and crew members. Fourteen people abandoned ship in two boats. The ship's second mate gave information to the authorities and the survivors were arrested. They were passed to the British authorities at Maldonado, Uruguay and detained on board HMS Curlew (Royal Navy). Flowery Land was on a voyage from London to Singapore, Straits Settlements. Seven of her crew were convicted of murder and were sentenced to hang. Another crew member was convicted of attempting to scuttle the ship, and was sentenced to 10 years penal servitude. Two of those convicted were reprieved, five were hanged at Newgate Prison, London on 23 February 1864. |
| Jeune Henri | France | The barque was wrecked at Saint-Vaast-la-Hougue, Manche with some loss of life. |
| Lucknow | United Kingdom | The ship was beached at Dungeness, Kent, where she was wrecked. Her crew were rescued. She was on a voyage from New York, United States to Antwerp, Belgium. |
| Orion | United Kingdom | The schooner was destroyed in the Welland Canal by the explosion of petroleum in her hold with the loss of four crew. |
| Percy | United Kingdom | The brig was driven ashore at Blyth, Northumberland. She was on a voyage from Hamburg to Sunderland, County Durham. She was refloated on 23 October and taken in to Blyth. |
| Trinidad | Prussia | The barque was wrecked on the Colorados, off the coast of Cuba. She was on a voyage from Matanzas, Cuba to New York. |

== 10 October ==
List of shipwrecks: 10 October 1863
| Ship | State | Description |
|---|---|---|
| Austral | United Kingdom | The full-rigged ship sprang a leak and sank in the Atlantic Ocean. Her crew were rescued by Rhine (United States). Austral was on a voyage from London to Adelaide, South Australia. |
| Ehdu | United Kingdom | The ship departed from Youghal, County Cork for Liverpool, Lancashire. No further trace, presumed foundered with the loss of all hands. |
| Elider | United Kingdom | The ship departed from Liverpool for Cork. No further trace, presumed foundered with the loss of all hands. |
| Elizabeth | United Kingdom | The ship capsized at Liverpool. |
| Energy | United Kingdom | The paddle tug ran aground and sank at the mouth of the River Tees. Her crew were rescued by a Prussian vessel. |
| Lina | Sweden | The ship collided with the barque City of Sidney (Norway) and was abandoned by her crew, who were rescued by City of Sidney. Lina was on a voyage from Newcastle upon Tyne, Northumberland, United Kingdom to Malmö.She was taken in to Helsingør, Denmark in a derelict condition. |
| Thorley | United Kingdom | The brig ran aground on the Sterlsand, in the North Sea and was abandoned. She was on a voyage from Hartlepool, County Durham to Hamburg. She was refloated the next day and taken in to Cuxhaven. |
| Vigilence | Sweden | The ship was driven ashore in Loch Boisdale. She was on a voyage from Douglas, Isle of Man to Gothenburg. She was refloated the next day. |

== 11 October ==
List of shipwrecks: 11 October 1863
| Ship | State | Description |
|---|---|---|
| Alfred | United Kingdom | The ship ran aground and sank in the River Wear. She was refloated. |
| Dashing Wave | United Kingdom | The ship was wrecked on the coast of Mexico. Her crew were rescued. |
| Douro | Confederate States of America | American Civil War, Union blockade: Carrying a cargo of cotton, rosin, tobacco, and turpentine, the steamer was chased ashore, set afire and destroyed on the coast of North Carolina near New Inlet by the sidewheel paddle steamer USS Nansemond (United States Navy). |
| Elvira | United States | The 222-ton sidewheel paddle steamer struck a snag and sank in the Mississippi River at the foot of Widow Beard's Island below St. Louis, Missouri. |
| Emma | United Kingdom | The brig was driven ashore on the Hurst Spit, Hampshire. She was on a voyage from Shoreham-by-Sea, Sussex to Swansea, Glamorgan. |
| Esperance | Kingdom of Hanover | The ship was driven ashore at Falsterbo, Sweden. She was on a voyage from Stettin to London, United Kingdom. She was refloated and taken in to Helsingør, Denmark in a leaky condition. |
| USS Madgie | United States Navy | American Civil War: The gunboat foundered in heavy seas off Frying Pan Shoals, North Carolina while under tow by the screw steamer USS Fahkee (United States Navy). |
| Marianne | Prussia | The barque was driven ashore on Bornholm, Denmark. Her crew were rescued. She was on a voyage from Memel, Prussia to Dublin, United Kingdom. |
| Onslow | (United Kingdom of Great Britain and Ireland) British North America | The schooner was driven ashore near Jonesport, Maine, United States. She was on a voyage from New York, United States to an Irish port. |
| Radiant | United Kingdom | The ship was driven ashore on "Tekeskar". She was on a voyage from Kronstadt, Russia to London. |
| Red Jacket | United Kingdom | The paddle steamer was wrecked on the Goat Island Reef, off Barbuda, Her crew were rescued. She was on a voyage from Cork to Nassau, Bahamas. |
| Reine des Flots | France | The brigantine ran aground on the Pennington Spit, in the English Channel. She was on a voyage from Vyborg, Grand Duchy of Finland to Bordeaux, Gironde. She was refloated but drove ashore on the Hurst Spit. |
| Rover | Flag unknown | American Civil War, Union blockade: The schooner ran ashore at Murrells Inlet, South Carolina, Confederate States of America. |
| Snip | Netherlands | The ketch ran aground on the Goodwin Sands, Kent, United Kingdom. She was refloated with assistance from the Walmer Lifeboat and a tug towed her in to Ramsgate, Kent. |

== 12 October ==
List of shipwrecks: 12 October 1863
| Ship | State | Description |
|---|---|---|
| RMS Africa | United Kingdom | The steamship struck a sunken rock off Cape Race, Newfoundland, British North America and was holed. She was on a voyage from Liverpool, Lancashire to Boston, Massachusetts, United States. She put in to Saint John's, Newfoundland sinking at the bows. |
| B. F. Carver | United States | The ship ran aground and was severely damaged at Fleetwood, Lancashire. |
| Columbia | Confederate States of America | American Civil War, Union blockade: The schooner was burned to the waterline at Ape's Hole near the head of Pocomoke Sound, 15 nautical miles (28 km) from Drummondtown, Virginia, by a Union small boat expedition. |
| Earl of Windsor | United Kingdom | The ship was wrecked at Port Albert, Victoria. |
| Elizabeth | United Kingdom | The ship capsized at Liverpool, Lancashire. |
| Jane | United Kingdom | American Civil War, Union blockade: The schooner was destroyed by her crew off the mouth of the Brazos River to prevent her capture by the armed sidewheel paddle steamer USS Tennessee (United States Navy). She blew up, and the explosion was heard 30 miles away in Galveston, Texas, Confederate States of America. |
| John | United Kingdom | The brigantine ran aground on the East Mouse, in Cemaes Bay, Anglesey. Her crew were rescued by a tug. |
| Peace | United Kingdom | The ship was driven ashore at Ness Point, Suffolk. She was refloated and towed in to Lowestoft, Suffolk. |
| Wilhelmines Haab | Norway | The brig was driven ashore and wrecked north of Stonehaven, Aberdeenshire, United Kingdom. Her eight crew were rescued. She was on a voyage from Porsgrund to Montrose, Forfarshire, United Kingdom. |

== 13 October ==
List of shipwrecks: 13 October 1863
| Ship | State | Description |
|---|---|---|
| Star of the North | United Kingdom | The ship was wrecked at "Mandilli", near Syros, Kingdom of Greece. Her crew survived. She was on a voyage from Constanţa, Ottoman Empire to Cork or Falmouth, Cornwall. |

== 14 October ==
List of shipwrecks: 14 October 1863
| Ship | State | Description |
|---|---|---|
| Culloden | United Kingdom | The ship was abandoned in the Atlantic Ocean (46°30′N 26°38′W). Her crew were rescued by New Brunswick ( (United Kingdom of Great Britain and Ireland) British North America) was on a voyage from Quebec City, Province of Canada, British North America to Liverpool, Lancashire. |
| Elizabeth | United Kingdom | The ship was abandoned in the Atlantic Ocean. Her crew were rescued by Cleopatra (United Kingdom). Elizabeth was on a voyage from Quebec City to Newcastle upon Tyne, Northumberland. |
| Lady Jackson | United States | The 207-ton sternwheel paddle steamer struck a snag and sank in the White River in Arkansas. |
| HMS Malacca | Royal Navy | The corvette ran aground at Fort St. Angelo, Malta. She was refloated and returned to service. |

== 15 October ==
List of shipwrecks: 15 October 1863
| Ship | State | Description |
|---|---|---|
| Ada | United Kingdom | The barque was run down and sunk in the Mediterranean Sea 25 nautical miles (46 km) off "Villa Rica" by the steamship Sicilian United Kingdom) with the loss of two lives. She was on a voyage from Arzew, Algeria to Hull, Yorkshire. |
| Good Intent | United Kingdom | The ship struck the breakwater at Great Yarmouth and was damaged. She was on a voyage from Great Yarmouth to Berwick upon Tweed, Northumberland. She put back to Great Yarmouth in a leaky condition. |
| H. L. Hunley | Confederate States Army | American Civil War: The submarine sank off Charleston, South Carolina, while making a mock attack during training in Charleston Harbor. The accident killed her entire eight-man crew, including her inventor, Horace Lawson Hunley. She was refloated and returned to service. |
| White | United States | American Civil War: The tug was destroyed at Pungo Landing, Virginia, Confederate States of America by Confederate forces on 15 or 16 October. |
| Unidentified dredge | United States | American Civil War: The dredge was destroyed at Pungo Landing, by Confederate forces on 15 or 16 October. |
| Unidentified vessels | United States | American Civil War: The vessels were destroyed at Pungo Landing, by Confederate forces on 15 or 16 October. |

== 16 October ==
List of shipwrecks: 16 October 1863
| Ship | State | Description |
|---|---|---|
| A. B. Noyes | United States | American Civil War: The barge was burned by Confederate forces in Tampa Bay off Fort Brooke, Florida, Confederate States of America. |
| Alpheus | United Kingdom | The steamship was driven ashore at Larne, County Antrim. She was on a voyage from Glasgow, Renfrewshire to Belfast, County Antrim. She was refloated. |
| Baltic | United Kingdom | The steamship was wrecked on the Alguada Reef. She was on a voyage from Rangoon, Burma to Calcutta, India. Her crew were rescued. |
| Elida | United Kingdom | The ship departed from for Liverpool, Lancashire for Cork. No further trace, presumed foundered with the loss of all hands. |
| Emma F. Minna | United Kingdom | The ship was abandoned in the Atlantic Ocean. Her crew were rescued by Eurydice (United Kingdom). Emma F. Minna was on a voyage from Quebec City, Province of Canada, British North America to Liverpool. |
| Industrie | France | The ship ran aground on the Gunfleet Sand, in the North Sea off the coast of Essex, United Kingdom. She was on a voyage from the Rance to London, United Kingdom. She was refloated on 26 October and taken in to Harwich, Essex. |
| Jane | Confederate States of America | American Civil War, Union blockade: The schooner was destroyed by her own crew in the Gulf of Mexico off the mouth of the Rio Grande to prevent her capture by the sidewheel paddle steamer USS Tennessee (United States Navy). |
| Margaret Leinhard | United Kingdom | The ship was driven ashore at Larne. She was on a voyage from Limerick to Liverpool, Lancashire. She was refloated. |
| Ocean Child | United Kingdom | The ship struck rocks at Cape Canso, Nova Scotia, British North America. She was on a voyage from Pugwash, Nova Scotia to Liverpool. She was refloated and put in to Pictou, Nova Scotia for repairs. |
| Phœnician | United Kingdom | The brig was abandoned in the Atlantic Ocean. Her crew were rescued by Echo (United Kingdom). Phœnician was on a voyage from New York, United States to Queenstown, County Cork. |

== 17 October ==
List of shipwrecks: 17 October 1863
| Ship | State | Description |
|---|---|---|
| Alida | Netherlands | The ship was driven ashore in the Wiener Diep. She was on a voyage from Bremen to Amsterdam, North Holland. She was refloated and put in to Geestemünde in a leaky condition. |
| Albion | United Kingdom | The barque was driven ashore on Jura, Inner Hebrides. She was on a voyage from Dublin to Danzig. She was later refloated and taken in to Londonderry for repairs. |
| Argo | United Kingdom | The ship was wrecked at Flamborough Head, Yorkshire. She was on a voyage from South Shields, County Durham to London. |
| Helena | United Kingdom | The ship was wrecked on the Zegler Sand, in the North Sea. She was on a voyage from Bo'ness, Lothian to Brake, Kingdom of Hanover. |
| Jessie Alexander | United Kingdom | The ship was driven ashore and wrecked on Stoneskar, Russia. She was on a voyage from St. Davids, Pembrokeshire to Kronstadt, Russia. She had become a wreck by 27 October. |
| Kate Dale | Confederate States of America | American Civil War, Union blockade: The blockade runner, carrying a cargo of cotton, was destroyed at her moorings in the Hillsborough River 2 nautical miles (3.7 km) above Tampa, Florida, by a landing party from the sidewheel paddle steamer USS Adela and the gunboat USS Tahoma (both United States Navy). |
| Princess | United Kingdom | The brigantine sprang a leak and foundered in the North Sea 8 nautical miles (15 km) off Filey, Yorkshire. Her crew were rescued by Willian and Henry (United Kingdom). Princess was on a voyage from South Shields to Great Yarmouth, Norfolk. |
| Rover | Confederate States of America | American Civil War, Union blockade: The schooner, carrying a cargo of cotton, was destroyed at Murrell's Inlet, South Carolina, by a boat crew from the schooner USS T. A. Ward. |
| Scottish Chief | Confederate States of America | American Civil War, Union blockade: The blockade runner, carrying a cargo of cotton, was destroyed at her mooring in the Hillsborough River 2 nautical miles (3.7 km) above Tampa, Florida, by a landing party from the sidewheel paddle steamer USS Adela and the gunboat USS Tahoma (both United States Navy). |
| Victor Emmanuel | United Kingdom | The ship was driven ashore at Fulta, India. She was on a voyage from Liverpool, Lancashire to Calcutta, Indoa. |

== 18 October ==
List of shipwrecks: 18 October 1863
| Ship | State | Description |
|---|---|---|
| Antigua Packet | United Kingdom | The brig was wrecked in the Solway Firth with the loss of her captain. She was on a voyage from Demerara, British Guiana to Workington, Cumberland. |
| Bertha | United Kingdom | The ship was driven ashore and wrecked near Schwarzort, Prussia. She was on a voyage from Hull, Yorkshire to Memel, Prussia. She broke up on 19 October. |
| Danube | United Kingdom | The brig ran aground on Scroby Sands, Norfolk. She was on a voyage from the River Tyne to Constantinople, Ottoman Empire. She was refloated and taken in to Great Yarmouth, Norfolk in a leaky condition. |
| John | United Kingdom | The schooner was lost off Amlwch, Anglesey. She was on a voyage from Runcorn, Cheshire to Pwllheli, Caernarfonshire. |
| Maid of Athens | United Kingdom | The brig ran aground north west of Læsø Denmark. She was on a voyage from Blyth, Northumberland to Korsør, Denmark. She was refloated and resumed her voyage. |
| shipMimosa | (United Kingdom of Great Britain and Ireland) New South Wales | The paddle steamer was wrecked at Bunga Head with the loss of two of the 38 people on board. She was on a voyage from Merimbula to Sydney. |

== 19 October ==
List of shipwrecks: 19 October 1863
| Ship | State | Description |
|---|---|---|
| Briton | United Kingdom | The ship was wrecked at Pondicherry, India. Her crew were rescued. She was on a voyage from Calcutta, India to Havre de Grâce, Seine-Inférieure, France and London. |
| Camilla | Italy | The ship ran aground on the Goodwin Sands, Kent, United Kingdom and sank. Her crew were rescued. She was on a voyage from Alexandria, Egypt to Great Yarmouth, Norfolk, United Kingdom. |
| Echo | (United Kingdom of Great Britain and Ireland) British North America | The schooner was wrecked on the Kicking Taylor Reef, off the south coast of Cuba. Her crew were rescued. |
| Fauzal | United Kingdom | The ship was wrecked at Cochin, India. |
| Marietta | Greece | The brig was driven ashore and wrecked at Tramore, County Waterford, United Kingdom. Her ten crew were rescued, nine by ropes from the shore and one by the Tramore Lifeboat. She was on a voyage from Lisbon, Portugal to Cardiff, Glamorgan, United Kingdom. |
| Midge | United Kingdom | The ship foundered in The Minch with the loss of all hands. |
| Rhadama II | United Kingdom | The ship was wrecked at Pondicherry. A crew member was reported missing. |
| Stever Wustrow | Wismar | The brig was driven ashore at Lønstrup, Denmark. Her crew were rescued. She was on a voyage from Hartlepool, County Durham, United Kingdom to Wismar. |
| Vulcan | United Kingdom | The ship was driven ashore at Nevsky, Russia. |
| Wings of the Wind | United Kingdom | The ship was wrecked at Cochin, India with the loss of eight of her crew. |

== 20 October ==
List of shipwrecks: 20 October 1863
| Ship | State | Description |
|---|---|---|
| Blossom | United Kingdom | The brig was wrecked on the Haaks Bank, in the North Sea. She was on a voyage from Newcastle upon Tyne, Northumberland to the Nieuw Diep. |
| George | United Kingdom | The ship struck the Plough Rock, in the North Sea off the coast of Northumberland. She was on a voyage from Port Dundas, Renfrewshire to London. She was refloated and taken in to North Sunderland, County Durham in a severely leaky condition. |
| Ida | United Kingdom | The brig was wrecked at Money Point, Cape North, Nova Scotia, British North America. Her crew were rescued. She was on a voyage from Barrow in Furness, Lancashire to Miramichi, New Brunswick, British North America. |
| Lady Matheson | United Kingdom | The ship was driven ashore near Oranienbaum, Russia. She was on a voyage from the Clyde to Saint Petersburg, Russia. |
| Malgenio | Spain | The brig was driven ashore and wrecked at Kilmore, County Wexford, United Kingdom. She was on a voyage from Liverpool, Lancashire to Sagua La Grande, Cuba. She was refloated on 14 November and towed in to Wexford in a severely damaged condition. |
| Mars | Flag unknown | American Civil War, Union blockade: The blockade runner ran aground on the coast of North Carolina, Confederate States of America. |

== 21 October ==
List of shipwrecks: 21 October 1863
| Ship | State | Description |
|---|---|---|
| Confidence | United Kingdom | The ship was driven ashore and sank at Porthdinllaen, Caernarfonshire. She was on a voyage from Aberdovey, Merionethshire to the River Dee. |
| Eriksen | (Russian Empire) Grand Duchy of Finland | The brig was driven ashore at Kastrup, Denmark. She was on a voyage from North Shields, Northumberland, United Kingdom to Kronstadt, Russia. She was refloated and resumed her voyage. |
| Fratelli Flori | Flag unknown | The ship ran ashore near Berdyansk, Russia. |
| Halcyon | United Kingdom | The ship ran aground on the Corton Sand, in the North Sea off the coast of Suffolk. She was on a voyage from Arkhangelsk, Russia to London. She was refloated and taken in to Lowestoft, Suffolk. |
| Thornton | United Kingdom | The ship ran aground at the mouth of the River Mersey. She was on a voyage from Saint John, New Brunswick, British North America to Liverpool, Lancashire. She was refloated and taken in to Liverpool. |
| Venus | United Kingdom | American Civil War, Union blockade: Bound from Nassau, Bahamas and trying to run the Union blockade from Bermuda with a cargo of rifle muskets, cartridges, lead, dry goods, bacon, coffee, rum, and medicine and a model of a railroad, the 365-ton sidewheel paddle steamer ran aground near the Cape Fear River on the coast of North Carolina, Confederate States of America with one crewman killed after taking four shell hits and beginning to take on water while under fire by the armed sidewheel paddle steamer USS Nansemond and the armed screw steamers USS Niphon and USS Iron Age (all United States Navy). U.S. Navy sailors boarded her and tried to refloat her but were unsuccessful, so they blew up her boilers and set her afire on the morning of 22 October, wrecking her. |

== 22 October ==
List of shipwrecks: 22 October 1863
| Ship | State | Description |
|---|---|---|
| Alexander Cooper | Confederate States of America | American Civil War, Union blockade: While anchored by a wharf on the coast of North Carolina about 6 nautical miles (11 km) up New Topsail Inlet, the schooner was burned by two boats from the gunboat USS Shokokon (United States Navy). |
| Briton | United Kingdom | The ship was wrecked at Madras, India. |
| Marianne | United Kingdom | The ship departed from the River Tyne for Barcelona, Spain. No further trace, presumed foundered with the loss of all hands. |
| Mencius | United Kingdom | The full-rigged ship was wrecked at Madras. |
| Mist | United States | American Civil War: The steamer was boarded and burned by Confederate guerillas at her mooring at Ship Island, Mississippi, Confederate States of America. |
| Oregon | United States | The 1,004-ton sidewheel paddle steamer sank in the North River, New York a few minutes after being almost cut in two in a collision with City of Boston (United States). One of Oregon′s passengers suffered minor injuries, but there were no deaths. |
| Punjab | United Kingdom | The barque was wrecked at Madras. |
| Radama II | United Kingdom | The ship was wrecked at Pondicherry. A crew member was reported missing. |
| Star of the North | United Kingdom | The ship was driven ashore on Syros, Greece. She was on a voyage from Costanţa, Ottoman Empire to a British port. |
| Unnamed | Flag unknown | The ship caught fire and was destroyed by an explosion 9 nautical miles (17 km) south of São Miguel Island, Azores. |

== 23 October ==
List of shipwrecks: 23 October 1863
| Ship | State | Description |
|---|---|---|
| Elbe | Hamburg | The ship was damaged by fire at Hamburg. |
| Pasha | United Kingdom | The ship ran aground on the Goodwin Sands, Kent. She was on a voyage from North Shields, Northumberland to a Spanish port. She was refloated and resumed her voyage. |
| Phœnix | United Kingdom | The ship was wrecked on Öland, Sweden. She was on a voyage from Newcastle upon Tyne, Northumberland to Vaasa, Grand Duchy of Finland. |
| Salazes | France | The barque collided with John Bright (United Kingdom) and sank in the South China Sea. Her crew were rescued. |
| Water Lily | (United Kingdom of Great Britain and Ireland) New Zealand | The ketch ran ashore and was wrecked on the Sumner Spit. |

== 24 October ==
List of shipwrecks: 24 October 1863
| Ship | State | Description |
|---|---|---|
| Amsterdam | United Kingdom | The ship departed from Liverpool, Lancashire for South Shields, County Durham. No further trace, presumed foundered with the loss of all hands. |
| Onslow | United States | The ship was wrecked near Head of the Harbor, New York. She was on a voyage from Eastport, Maine to a port in Ireland. |
| Zelie | (United Kingdom of Great Britain and Ireland) British North America | The schooner sank near Deschambault, Province of Canada. She was on a voyage from Quebec City to Montreal. |
| Unidentified mortar boat | United States Navy | The mortar boat capsized and sank in the Mississippi River at the mouth of the canal near Vicksburg, Mississippi, Confederate States of America while under tow by the steamer USS Petrel (United States Navy). |

== 25 October ==
List of shipwrecks: 25 October 1863
| Ship | State | Description |
|---|---|---|
| Active | United Kingdom | The schooner ran aground on the Roaring Middle Sand, in the North Sea. She was on a voyage from King's Lynn, Norfolk to Middlesbrough, Yorkshire. She was refloated and assisted in to King's Lynn. |
| Clara | United Kingdom | The ship was driven ashore and wrecked on Saaremaa, Russia with the loss of three of her crew. She was on a voyage from Sunderland, County Durham to Kronstadt, Russia. |
| Drie Gezusters | Netherlands | The koff was driven ashore on Norderney, Kingdom of Hanover. She was on a voyage from Hooksiel, Kingdom of Hanover to London, United Kingdom. She was refloated and taken in to Bremerhaven in a leaky condition. |

== 26 October ==
List of shipwrecks: 26 October 1863
| Ship | State | Description |
|---|---|---|
| Charles Martel | France | The ship was abandoned in the Atlantic Ocean. Her crew were rescued. She was on a voyage from New York, United States to Marseille, Bouches-du-Rhône. |
| Christian | United Kingdom | The ship was driven ashore at Bowmore, Islay, Inner Hebrides. She was on a voyage from the Clyde to Sligo. She was refloated on 28 November and subsequently resumed her voyage. |
| Key West No. 2 | United States | The 206-ton sternwheel paddle steamer struck a snag and sank in the Mississippi River at Chester, Illinois. |
| Mary Anne Henderson | United Kingdom | The ship was driven ashore near Bowmore. She was on a voyage from the Clyde to Port Charlotte, Islay. |
| Scotland | United Kingdom | The brig was driven ashore and wrecked on Nantucket Island, Massachusetts, United States. Her crew were rescued. She was on a voyage from Pictou, Nova Scotia, British North America to Boston, Massachusetts. |
| Sir William Wallace | United Kingdom | The ship was driven ashore near Bowmore. She was on a voyage from Dundalk, County Louth to Port Charlotte. |
| Tonquin | United States | American Civil War: The ship was captured and burnt by a Confederate ship. She was on a voyage from Dupont to Havre de Grâce, Seine-Inférieure, France. |
| What-you-like | (United Kingdom of Great Britain and Ireland) | The lighter capsized at Lyttelton. |

== 27 October ==
List of shipwrecks: 27 October 1863
| Ship | State | Description |
|---|---|---|
| Constance | United Kingdom | The ship ran aground at Cardiff, Glamorgan. |
| Harlequin | United Kingdom | The ship was lost in the South China Sea. She was on a voyage from Shanghai to Newchang, China. |
| Semaphore | United Kingdom | The ship ran aground in Bootle Bay. She was on a voyage from Belfast, County Antrim to Liverpool, Lancashire. She was refloated and taken in to Liverpool. |

== 28 October ==
List of shipwrecks: 28 October 1863
| Ship | State | Description |
|---|---|---|
| Balaklava | United Kingdom | The steamship was driven ashore at Wells-next-the-Sea, Norfolk. She was on a voyage from North Shields, Northumberland to Woolwich, Kent. She was refloated and resumed her voyage. |
| Salem | United Kingdom | The brig ran aground on the Knaphagen, in the Baltic Sea. She was on a voyage from Copenhagen, Denmark to Helsinki, Grand Duchy of Finland. She was refloated the next day and taken in to Helsingør, Denmark. |
| Tycho | Sweden | The schooner ran aground on Skagen, Denmark. She was on a voyage from Gävle to Grimsby, Lincolnshire, United Kingdom. She was refloated and put in to Mollösund. |

== 29 October ==
List of shipwrecks: 29 October 1863
| Ship | State | Description |
|---|---|---|
| Advance | United Kingdom | The ship was driven ashore on the Holy Isle, in the Firth of Clyde. She was on a voyage from Glasgow, Renfrewshire to Belfast, County Antrim. |
| Alexander | United Kingdom | The schooner was driven ashore at Portpatrick, Wigtownshire. Her crew were rescued. She was on a voyage from Troon, Ayrshire to Dublin. |
| Ann and Margaret | United Kingdom | The schooner was driven ashore at Whitehaven, Cumberland. She was on a voyage from Bangor to Whitehaven. |
| Barbara | Norway | The barque ran aground on the North Bull, in the Irish Sea off the coast of County Dublin, United Kingdom. She was refloated on 2 November and taken in to Dublin. |
| Better Luck Still | United Kingdom | The ship was driven ashore at Gronan, near Ayr. Her crew were rescued. She was on a voyage from Belfast, County Antrim to Ayr. |
| Ebenezer | United Kingdom | The sloop was abandoned in the North Sea off Kirkcaldy, Fife and foundered. Her crew survived. She was on a voyage from Fisherrow, Lothian to Berwick upon Tweed, Northumberland. |
| Julius | Norway | The schooner foundered in the North Sea 20 nautical miles (37 km) south of the Isle of May, Fife, United Kingdom. Her crew were rescued by the brig Louise Auguste (Prussia). Julius was on a voyage from Tønsberg to Hull, Yorkshire, United Kingdom. |
| Lady of the Lake | United Kingdom | The sloop sank Inchkeith, Fife. Her two crew were reported missing. |
| Lemnos | United Kingdom | The brig was driven ashore and wrecked 8 nautical miles (15 km) from Lytham St. Annes, Lancashire. Her crew were rescued. She was on a voyage from Liverpool, Lancashire to Las Palmas, Canary Islands. |
| Lillies | (United Kingdom of Great Britain and Ireland) British North America | The full-rigged ship was abandoned in Morecambe Bay. Twenty-six people were rescued by the Fleetwood Lifeboat. The remainder of her crew were subsequently rescued by the steamship Talbot (United Kingdom). Lillies subsequently came ashore and sank. She was on a voyage from Liverpool to Bombay, India. She was refloated and taken in to the River Lune. |
| Louisa | United Kingdom | The schooner was wrecked near Portpatrick. She was on a voyage from Workington, Cumberland to Belfast. |
| Magneten | Norway | The ship was driven ashore at Peterhead, Aberdeenshire, United Kingdom. She was on a voyage from Mandal to Peterhead. She was refloated and taken in to Peterhead. |
| Mary | United Kingdom | The ship was driven ashore on the Holy Isle. She was on a voyage from Bangor, Caernarfonshire to Irvine, Ayrshire. |
| Mount Carmel | United Kingdom | The barque was driven ashore at Port Logan, Wigtownshire. She was on a voyage from Troon to Passage West, County Cork. |
| Northern Lights | United Kingdom | The schooner was wrecked at Pilling, Lancashire. Her four crew were rescued by the Fleetwood Lifeboat. She was on a voyage from Dundalk, County Louth to Preston, Lancashire. |
| Pioneer | United Kingdom | The fishing smack was driven ashore at Fleetwood. Her crew were rescued. |
| Sarepta | United Kingdom | The brig was driven ashore in North Bay, Ayrshire. She was on a voyage from Sulina, Ottoman Empire to the Clyde. She was refloated the next day and taken in to Troon. |
| Siren | United Kingdom | The brigantine ran aground on the wreck of City of Lucknow (United Kingdom). She was refloated the next day and taken in to Belfast for repairs. |
| Tamworth | Norway | The barque foundered 5 nautical miles (9.3 km) south west of Southport, Lancashire. Her seventeen crew were rescued by the Southport Lifeboat Jessie Knowles (United Kingdom). Tamworth was on a voyage from Liverpool to Havana, Cuba. |
| Unity | United Kingdom | The full-rigged ship was driven ashore and severely damaged at Lindisfarne, Northumberland. She was on a voyage from Aberdeen to Newcastle upon Tyne. She was refloated. |
| Vesper | United Kingdom | The ship departed from Danzig for London. No further trace, presumed foundered with the loss of all hands. |
| Unnamed | United Kingdom | The sloop collided with a brig off Kingstown, County Dublin. Her crew were presumed to have been rescued by the brig before the sloop foundered. |

== 30 October ==
List of shipwrecks: 30 October 1863
| Ship | State | Description |
|---|---|---|
| Angelina, and William Dargan | United Kingdom | The brigantine William Dargan ran aground on a sandbank in the Solway Firth. She was then run into by the schooner Angelina and was severely damaged. She floated off and was run ashore near Beckfoot, Cumberland. Her crew survived. Angelina was severely damaged and was beached west of Beckfoot. She was abandoned by her crew. |
| Astrea | United Kingdom | The schooner ran aground on the Horseshoe Bank, in the Bristol Channel and sank. Her crew were rescued. She was on a voyage from Waterford to Bristol, Gloucestershire. |
| Better Luck Still | United Kingdom | The ship was driven ashore and wrecked north of Girvan, Ayrshire. Her crew were rescued. She was on a voyage from Belfast, County Antrim to Girvan. |
| Conqueror | United Kingdom | The ship was driven ashore at Redcar, Yorkshire. She was on a voyage from London to Middlesbrough, Yorkshire. She was refloated and towed in to Middlesbrough. |
| Emma | United Kingdom | The schooner struck an anchor and sank in the River Thames at Woolwich, Kent, United Kingdom. |
| Enterprise | United Kingdom | The sloop collided with a schooner and ran aground on the Long Nose Sandbank. She was on a voyage from Poole, Dorset to Middlesbrough, Yorkshire. She was refloated with assistance from the lugger Mary (United Kingdom). |
| Favourite | United Kingdom | The sloop was run ashore and sank at Theddlethorpe, Lincolnshire. All on board were rescued by the Coast Guard. She was on a voyage from King's Lynn, Norfolk to Goole, Yorkshire. |
| Gardner Walker | (United Kingdom of Great Britain and Ireland) British North America | The brigantine foundered in the Saltee Islands, County Wexford. Her crew survived. She was on a voyage from Drogheda, County Louth to Sydney, Nova Scotia. She came ashore the next day at "Brideshaven", Pembrokeshire in a derelict condition. |
| Gipsey | United Kingdom | The ship was driven ashore at Drogheda, County Louth. Her crew were rescued by the Drogheda Lifeboat. She was on a voyage from Preston, Lancashire to Drogheda. She was refloated the next day and towed in to Drogheda. |
| Jane | United Kingdom | The brig was wrecked at West Tarbert, Wigtownshire. She was on a voyage from Liverpool, Lancashire to Troon, Ayrshire. |
| John | United Kingdom | The schooner was driven ashore on "Begnes Island", County Cork. She was on a voyage from Limerick to the Mumbles, Glamorgan. |
| Lillias | United Kingdom | The ship was reported to have foundered in the Irish Sea off the coast of Lancashire. The tug Wyre (United Kingdom) towed the Fleetwood Lifeboat out to her, and 26 of her 29 crew got on board the tug. Attempts by the lifeboat to take the remaining crew off were unsuccessful. The survivors were subsequently rescued by the steamship Talbot (United Kingdom). Lillias was on a voyage from Liverpool, Lancashire to Bombay, India. She was subsequently taken in to Glasson Dock, Lancashire in a waterlogged condition. |
| Louisa | United Kingdom | The schooner was wrecked at West Tarbert. She was on a voyage from Workington, Cumberland to Belfast, County Antrim. |
| Marquis of Sligo | United Kingdom | The schooner was run into by the brig Elizabeth (Denmark) and sank at Margate, Kent. Her six crew were rescued by Elizabeth and the lugger Eclipse (United Kingdom). Marquis of Sligo was on a voyage from South Shields, County Durham to Torbay, Devon. |
| Pioneer | United Kingdom | The fishing boat sank at Pilling. Her crew were rescued. |
| HMS Prince Consort | Royal Navy | The Prince Consort-class ironclad put in to Kingstown, County Dublin in a sinking condition. She was on a voyage from Plymouth, Devon to the River Mersey. |
| Providence | Danzig | The barque was driven ashore in Macrihanish Bay. Her seven crew were rescued; some by ropes from the shore, others by the Campbeltown Lifeboat. |
| Rook | United Kingdom | The ship sank in the Duddon Estuary. Her crew were rescued. She was on a voyage from Ardrossan, Ayrshire to Morecambe, Lancashire. |
| Saucy Jack | United Kingdom | The smack was driven ashore at Cairnbulg, Aberdeenshire. Both crew survived. She was on a voyage from Aberdeen to Wick, Caithness. |
| Venturia | United States | The barque was driven ashore and wrecked in Broadhaven Bay. Her crew were rescued. She was on a voyage from New York to Sligo, United Kingdom. |
| Unnamed | United Kingdom | The ship was driven ashore near Beckfoot. |
| Unnamed | Flag unknown | The schooner foundered off the Isles of Scilly with the loss of all hands. |

== 31 October ==
List of shipwrecks: 31 October 1863
| Ship | State | Description |
|---|---|---|
| Achilles | Prussia | The barque was driven ashore at Abergele, Caernarfonshire, United Kingdom. Her crew were rescued. She was on a voyage from Dublin to St. Ubes, Portugal. |
| Active | United Kingdom | The schooner foundered in the North Sea. Her crew were rescued by Toskea (Norway). Active was on a voyage from Stettin to Aberdeen. |
| Anna | United Kingdom | The ship sank on the Kjeldsand, in the North Sea. Her crew were rescued. She was on a voyage from Hull, Yorkshire to Fanø, Denmark. |
| Benledi | United Kingdom | The barque capsized and sank in the River Thames at Wapping, Middlesex. She was on a voyage from London to Sunderland, County Durham. She was subsequently righted and beached. |
| Caroline Prince | United Kingdom | The schooner was driven aghore at Agger, Denmark. She was on a voyage from London to Copenhagen, Denmark. |
| Elizabeth | United Kingdom | The ship was abandoned in the North Sea 50 nautical miles (93 km) east of Spurn Point, Yorkshire. Her crew were rescued by the smack Questor (United Kingdom). Elizabeth was on a voyage from Sunderland to Maldon, Essex. |
| Esmeralda | United Kingdom | The schooner was driven ashore and damaged at Scalloway, Shetland Islands. |
| Everthorpe | United Kingdom | The ship was driven ashore at Narva, Russia. Her crew were rescued. She was on a voyage from Kronstadt, Russia to Hull. |
| Giacomo | Italy | The brig was driven ashore in the Gulf of Palmas. She was on a voyage from Messina, Sicily to an English port. |
| Hero | Prussia | The brig was driven ashore at Helsingør, Denmark. She was on a voyage from Newcastle upon Tyne, Northumberland, United Kingdom to Copenhagen. |
| Jane | United Kingdom | The brig foundered in the Boston Deeps with the loss of all ten crew. |
| Jumna, or Minna | Lübeck | The brig was wrecked on Walney Island, Lancashire, United Kingdom. Her crew were rescued. She was on a voyage from Liverpool, Lancashire to Lübeck. |
| Juno | United Kingdom | The brig was wrecked on the Norden Gronden, off the mouth of the Elbe. Her crew survived. She was on a voyage from Hamburg to London. |
| Kate | United States | The schooner was lost at Brazos Pass on the coast of Texas, Confederate States of America. |
| London | United Kingdom | The schooner was driven ashore and wrecked 6 nautical miles (11 km) south of St Bees Head, Cumberland. Her crew were rescued. She was on a voyage from Workington, Cumberland to Dublin. |
| Maria | United Kingdom | The schooner was abandoned in the North Sea. Her five crew were rescued the next day by Enterprise (United Kingdom). |
| Mary | United Kingdom | The brig was abandoned in the North Sea. Her crew were rescued by the smack Quester (United Kingdom). |
| Mary Kerr | United Kingdom | The ship was driven ashore in Lough Foyle at the "Warren Lighthouse". She had become a wreck by 17 November |
| Mechanic | United Kingdom | The barque foundered in the Atlantic Ocean. Her crew were rescued by Waterlily (United Kingdom). Mechanic was on a voyage from South Shields, County Durham to Barcelona, Spain. |
| Nelson | United Kingdom | The schooner foundered in the North Sea. Her crew were rescued by a Dutch fishing smack. She was on a voyage from Seaham, County Durham to Jersey, Channel Islands. |
| Providence | Danzig | The barque was wrecked at Westport, Argyllshire. Seven crew were rescued by the Campbeltown Lifeboat, the rest got ashore. |
| Rica | Flag unknown | The ship was driven ashore and wrecked near Lysekil, Sweden. |
| Sarah | United Kingdom | The steamship ran aground near Hellevoetsluis, Zeeland, Netherlands. She was refloated. |
| Thetis | United Kingdom | The schooner was abandoned off Dover, Kent in a waterlogged condition. She was on a voyage from Sunderland to Honfleur, Manche, France. |
| Thrush | United Kingdom | The ship was driven ashore and wrecked at Narva. Her crew were rescued. She was on a voyage from Kronstadt to Hull. |
| Union | United States | The 227-ton sidewheel paddle steamer was stranded in the Gulf of Mexico off the coast of Texas. |
| Vanguard | United Kingdom | The ship ran aground at Melbourne, Victoria. She was on a voyage from Liverpool to Melbourne. She was later refloated. |
| Walvisch | United Kingdom | The full-rigged ship ran aground on a reef in the Macclesfield Channel. She was on a voyage from Sunderland to Singapore, Straits Settlements. She was refloated and completed her voyage, arriving on 19 November. |
| Two unidentified schooners | United States | The two schooners – one of which may have been Kate – foundered in the Gulf of Mexico off the coast of Texas during a storm. |
| Unknown | Flag unknown | The ship was wrecked on the Longsand, in the North Sea off the coast of Essex, United Kingdom. |

== Unknown date ==
List of shipwrecks: Unknown date in October 1863
| Ship | State | Description |
|---|---|---|
| Alberta | United Kingdom | The ship struck a sunken rock and was beached in Otterswick Bay. She was on a voyage from Stettin to Londonderry. |
| Alice Abbott | United Kingdom | The barque was lost on the coast of Nova Scotia, British North America before 15 October. She was on a voyage from Greenock, Renfrewshire to Miramichi, New Brunswick, British North America |
| Angeline | France | The ship was wrecked on the Alecranes, in the Gulf of Mexico before 29 October. She was on a voyage from Marseille, Bouches-du-Rhône to Veracruz, Mexico. |
| Antigua Packet | United Kingdom | The brig was wrecked in the Solway Firth with the loss of her captain. She was on a voyage from Demerara, British Guiana to Workington, Cumberland. |
| Argo | United Kingdom | The ship struck the "Ron" and was abandoned by her crew. She was on a voyage from Fredrikshavn, Denmark to Middlesbrough, Yorkshire. She was taken in to Gothenburg, Sweden in a waterlogged condition on 1 November. |
| Balaclava | United Kingdom | The steamship was driven ashore at Wells-next-the-Sea, Norfolk. She was on a voyage from Newcastle upon Tyne, Northumberland to Woolwich, Kent. She was refloated and resumed her voyage. |
| Bendeditus | United Kingdom | The ship was lost near Wadsoe, Norway. |
| Berthe | France | The ship was wrecked at Cape Espichel, Portugal. |
| Caroline | United Kingdom | The ship struck the breakwater at Castle Cornet, Guernsey, Channel Islands and sank. She was on a voyage from Dénia, Spain to London. |
| Catharina Charlotta | Flag unknown | The ship collided with Martin Pust (Flag unknown) and sank off Rügen, Prussia. |
| Chanticleer | United Kingdom | The ship foundered in the Atlantic Ocean. She was on a voyage from Nova Scotia to the West Indies. |
| Charlotte | United Kingdom | The ship was driven ashore on Hiiumaa, Russia. She was on a voyage from Skellefteå, Sweden to Wisbech, Cambridgeshire. She was refloated and taken in to Copenhagen, Denmark, where she arrived on 8 October in a leaky condition. |
| Darien | United Kingdom | The ship was wrecked on Nickman's Ground, in the Baltic Sea whilst bound for Kronstadt, Russia. |
| Duke of Wellington | United Kingdom | The ship collided with HMS Scylla (Royal Navy) and foundered in the Bay of Biscay. |
| Elbe | Hamburg | The ship ran aground on the Goodwin Sands, Kent. She was on a voyage from "Newport" to Alicante, Spain. |
| Emigrant | United Kingdom | The ship was wrecked in the Strait of Belle Isle before 9 October, Her crew were rescued. She was on a voyage from Greenock to Quebec City, Province of Canada, British North America. |
| Equity | United Kingdom | The ship departed from London for North Shields, Northumberland. No further trace, presumed foundered with the loss of all ten crew. |
| Fox | United States | The 102-ton steamer burned on Lake Erie near Newport, Michigan. |
| Frederica Ernestine | Prussia | The barque was abandoned in the Atlantic Ocean before 22 October. |
| Frederick Brunning | United States | The ship was abandoned in the Atlantic Ocean before 8 October. |
| Fruiterer | United Kingdom | The barque collided with Viscount Canning (United Kingdom) and sank in the South China Sea between 18 and 26 October. Her crew were rescued by Viscount Canning. |
| George | United Kingdom | The ship was driven ashore. She was on a voyage from North Sunderland, County Durham to Quebec City. She was refloated and completed her voyage in a severely leaky condition, arriving at Quebec City on 18 October. |
| George Prescott | United Kingdom | The ship ran aground off Falmouth, Jamaica and was scuttled before 14 October. |
| Gorilla | United Kingdom | The ship was abandoned in the Atlantic Ocean. Her crew were rescued by Eliza Wilson (United Kingdom). Gorilla was on a voyage from Liverpool, Lancashire to Boston, Massachusetts, United States. |
| Hannibal | United States | The 497-ton sidewheel paddle steamer struck a snag and sank in the Mississippi River 5 nautical miles (9.3 km) above Donaldsonville, Louisiana, Confederate States of America. |
| Harriet | United Kingdom | The full-rigged ship was abandoned in the Atlantic Ocean. |
| Hebe | United Kingdom | The ship was run down in the Kattegat. She was on a voyage from Sundsvall, Sweden to Dublin. She was towed in to Gothenburg, Sweden in a waterlogged condition. |
| Irene | United Kingdom | The ship collided with Marquis of Lorne (United Kingdom) in the Bristol Channel. She was on a voyage from Newport, Monmouthshire to Liverpool. She put in to Dale, Pembrokeshire in a sinking condition. She was towed in to Milford Haven, where she collided with Boyne (United Kingdom). |
| Industry | United Kingdom | The ship ran aground on the Gunfleet Sand, in the North Sea off the coast of Suffolk. She was on a voyage from Gävle, Sweden to London. |
| Istamboul | United Kingdom | The ship was wrecked at Diamond Harbour, India before 15 October. She was on a voyage from Calcutta, India to Singapore, Straits Settlements. |
| Jane | United Kingdom | The ship was wrecked on Anticosti Island, Province of Canada. Her crew were rescued. |
| Julie | United Kingdom | The ship struck a sunken rock and was holed. She was on a voyage from Gothenburg, Sweden to Bo'ness, Lothian. She was taken in to Rasvåg, Norway in a waterlogged condition. |
| Juno | United Kingdom | The ship was driven ashore and wrecked on "Skallengen" before 10 October. |
| Lancaster | United Kingdom | The ship ran aground off Vlissingen, Zeeland, Netherlands. She was on a voyage from Antwerp, Belgium to New York, United States. |
| Lizzie L. Haden | United Kingdom | The ship was lost near Rangoon, Burma before 29 October. She was on a voyage from Penang, Malaya to Rangoon. |
| Maria | United Kingdom | The ship was wrecked in the Magdalen Islands, British North America. She was on a voyage from Montreal, Province of Canada to London. |
| Marietta | United Kingdom | The ship was driven ashore near Algeciras, Spain. She was on a voyage from Taganrog, Russia to Odesa and Queenstown, County Cork. She was consequently condemned. |
| Marryat | United Kingdom | The ship was abandoned in the Atlantic Ocean before 31 October. |
| Maylath | United Kingdom | The ship was driven ashore. She was on a voyage from Cardiff to Ancona, Papal States. She was refloated and taken in to Ancona in a leaky condition. |
| Mencula | United Kingdom | The ship was wrecked at Madras, India. |
| Middleton | United Kingdom | The ship departed from Sulina, Ottoman Empire in mid-October. No further trace, presumed foundered with the loss of all hands. |
| Montebello | United Kingdom | The ship was abandoned in the Atlantic Ocean. She was on a voyage from Barbados to Ragged Island, Bahamas. |
| Noel Raphael | France | The brig was driven ashore at Ingoldmells, Lincolnshire, United Kingdom. She was on a voyage from Christiania, Norway to Nantes, Loire-Inférieure. She was refloated on 13 October with the assistance of the tug Robert Burns (United Kingdom) and towed in to Grimsby, Lincolnshire. |
| Ocean | Denmark | The ship ran aground at Longhope, Orkney Islands, United Kingdom. She was on a voyage from Greenland to Copenhagen. |
| Ocean Nymph | United Kingdom | The barque was holed by ice in Hudson Bay. She was on a voyage from London to Hudson Bay. She put in to St. John's, Newfoundland, British North America in a leaky condition. |
| Orion | United Kingdom | The ship was driven ashore at Drogheda, County Louth. She was on a voyage from Workington, Cumberland to Drogheda. |
| Pisco | France | The ship was destroyed by fire at Cienfuegos, Cuba. All on board were rescued. She was on a voyage from Marseille, Bouches-du-Rhône to Havana. |
| Plantagenet | United Kingdom | The ship was beached at Milford Haven, Pembrokeshire. She was on a voyage from Hartlepool, County Durham to Alicante, Spain. |
| Pride | (United Kingdom of Great Britain and Ireland) British North America | The ship was driven ashore on Panmure Island, Prince Edward Island. She was on a voyage from Charlottetown, Prince Edward Island to Liverpool. |
| Princess Royal | United Kingdom | The ship was wrecked in the Grenadine Islands before 14 October. She was on a voyage from Barbados to Trinidad. |
| Richard Pearce | United Kingdom | The ship foundered in the English Channel 25 nautical miles (46 km) off the coast of Devon. All eight people on board survived. |
| Sceptre | Rostock | The ship was driven ashore near Helsingør, Denmark. |
| Sif | United Kingdom | The ship was driven ashore on the coast of Norway before 14 October. She was refloated and taken in to Langesund. |
| Smoker | Flag unknown | The ship was wrecked at Tampico, Mexico before 29 October. |
| Starling | United Kingdom | The ship was wrecked at Holywell, Flintshire. She was on a voyage from Rye, Sussex to Holywell. |
| Stirling Castle | United Kingdom | The ship ran aground in the Hooghly River. She was on a voyage from Calcutta to Liverpool. She had been refloated by 9 October. |
| Susannah | Chile | The full-rigged ship was wrecked near Talcahuano before 14 October. |
| Swallow | United Kingdom | The steamship was driven ashore at Donna Nook, Lincolnshire. She was refloated on 22 October and resumed her voyage. |
| Tottleben | Prussia | The barque was lost in the Atlantic Ocean. |
| Vanguard | United Kingdom | The paddle tug sank in The Narrows. She was later refloated and beached at North Shields. Subsequently scrapped. |
| Venez | United Kingdom | The ship was lost on a voyage from Sundsvall to London. |
| Water Witch | United States | Carrying a mixed cargo, the 369-ton screw steamer sank in Lake Huron less than 2 nautical miles (3.7 km) off Oscoda, Michigan, (44°25′N 83°19′W). |
| Unidentified schooners and boats | Confederate States of America | American Civil War: A Union expedition destroyed 150 schooners and boats in Mathews County, Virginia, between 4 and 9 October. |
