= Machiko Kawana =

Japanese voice actress (born 1983)

- 川名 真知子
- Born: September 30, 1983 (age 43); Tokyo, Japan
- Occupation: Voice actress
- Years active: 2004–present
- Agent: Aoni Production
- Notable work: Demashita! Powerpuff Girls Z as Kaoru Matsubara
- Website: Official profile

Machiko Kawana (川名 真知子, Kawana Machiko; born September 30, 1983) is a Japanese voice actress affiliated with Aoni Production. She was born in Tokyo and is best known for her role as Kaoru Matsubara, also known in her Powerpuff Girl Z form as "Powered Buttercup", in the television anime series Demashita! Powerpuff Girls Z.

== Filmography ==
=== Anime ===
- Beyblade: Metal Fusion (Sora Akatsuki)
- Clannad (Botan, Female student)
- Clannad After Story (Botan, Child, Mother, Student)
- D.C.S.S. ~Da Capo Second Season~ (Female Student)
- Gegege no Kitarō (2007~2009) (Boy, Child)
- Kekkaishi (Akira)
- Monochrome Factor (High school female student)
- Moribito: Guardian of the Spirit (Nobo)
- Powerpuff Girls Z (Kaoru Matsubara/Powered Buttercup)
- Speed Grapher
- Yakitate!! Japan (Chihiro)

=== Original video animation (OVA) ===
- Sakura Taisen: New York NY. (Kelly)

=== Video games ===
- Fist of the North Star: Ken's Rage (Myu and Taki)
