= Federal Government Girls' College, Owerri =

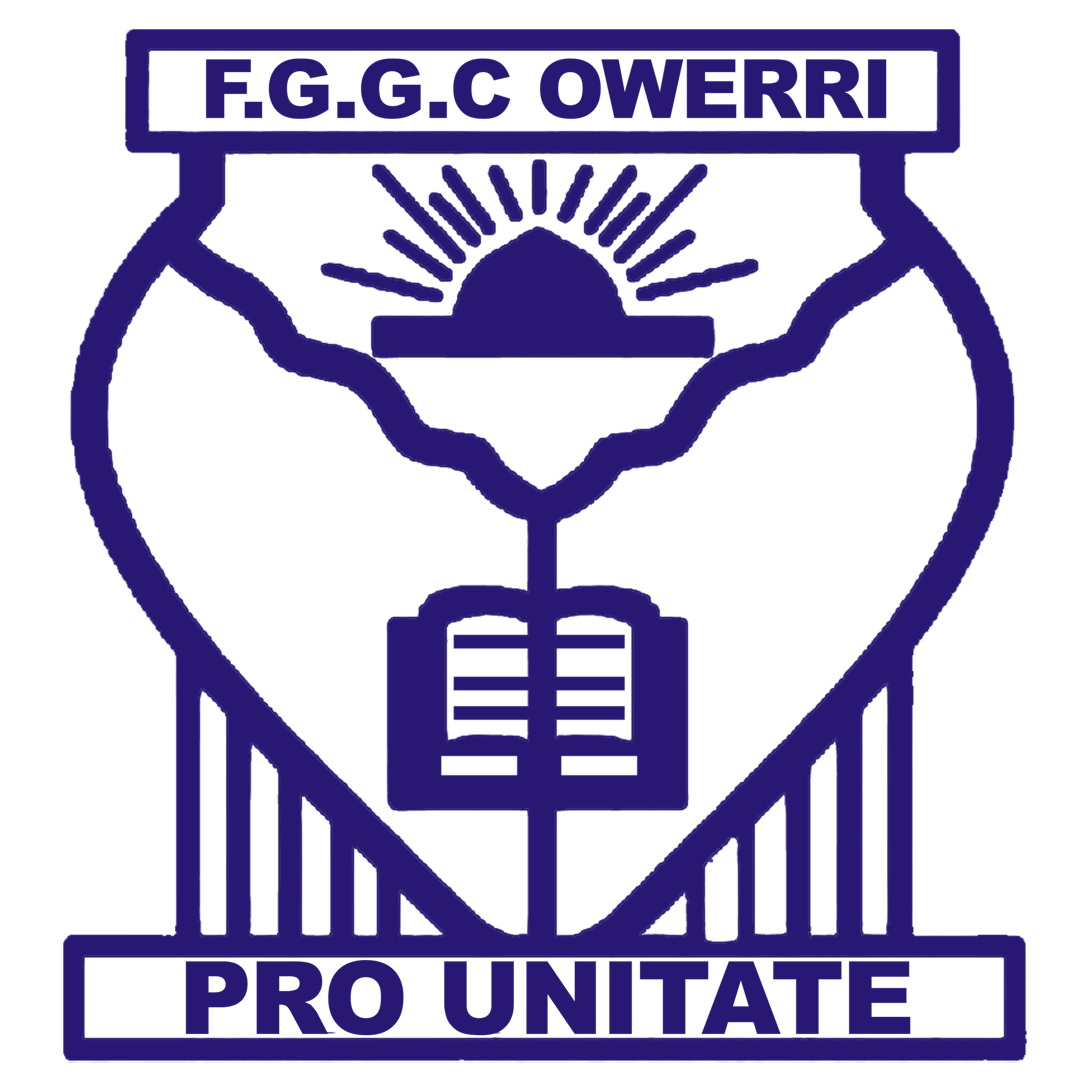
- Owerri, Imo State; Nigeria

Information
- Established: 14 November 1973
- Gender: Girls

Federal Government Girls' College, Owerri is a secondary school in Owerri, Imo State, Nigeria. It is a model secondary school for girls, which was established in 1973. The first principal of the school was Ms. Sheila Everard, (1973 to 1980) the current principal is Mrs. Obiagwu Francisca Chinwe. Being one of the country's unity schools, it was founded after the Nigerian Civil War to "promote integration among ethnic groups and to discourage divisions and tribalism". Local languages such as Igbo were taught at the institution. The school has graduates excelling in all fields of endeavor around the world in Medicine, Education, Engineering, Legal, Optometry, Economics to name a few. And has alumnae chapters in the different parts of Nigeria, United Kingdom, United States, Europe and the Americas. In November 2023 the school will celebrate its golden jubilee. Fifty years anniversary, Alumnae are expected to converge in Owerri city from around the world to celebrate the occasion. According to the BBC, straightening one's hair was banned in the school.

The school was built on land acquired by the Federal Ministry of Education from Government college Owerri. While a permanent structure was being built. The school uniform comprises blue shirts with navy blue skirts for the senior girls, and pinafores for the junior girls.

== Notable alumni ==
- Ezinne Akudo, lawyer and beauty queen
- Adaobi Tricia Nwaubani, novelist, humorist, essayist and journalist
- Nnenna Elendu Ukeje, politician
- Ola Uduku, architect and professor
- Blossom Maduafokwa, Health Physician
