= Ola Uduku =

British African architect

- Born: Nwola Oluwakemi Uduku
- Education: University of Cambridge (PhD); University of Strathclyde (MBA)
- Scientific career
- Workplaces: Manchester School of Architecture; University of Edinburgh
- Thesis: Factors affecting the design of secondary schools in Nigeria (1992)

Ola Uduku is a British African architect who is Head of School at the Liverpool School of Architecture. Uduku is a member of the Nigerian Institute of Architects and the Royal Institute of British Architects. She specialises in African educational architecture.

== Early life and education ==
Uduku is from Nigeria. She attended Federal Government Girls' College, Owerri. She studied architecture at the University of Nigeria, where she worked toward a master's degree in the design of solar housing in the Tropics. She moved to the United Kingdom for her graduate studies. Uduku earned her M.Phil, followed by her doctoral degree at the University of Cambridge, where she researched factors that impacted the design of schools in Nigeria. She is an historic fellow of Robinson College Cambridge. After earning her doctorate, Uduku completed her part 2 RIBA at the Royal Institute of British Architects and is an associate member of the RIBA. She also has part 3 qualifications from the Nigeria Institute of Architects. She obtained an MBA from the University of Strathclyde, and has a PgCert in Education from the University of the Arts, London.

== Research and career ==
A few years later, Uduku joined the University of Strathclyde, where she earned a Master of Business Administration. Uduku served as Associate Professor in Architecture and Dean for Africa at the University of Edinburgh. Her research considers educational architecture in Africa.

In 2001, Uduku became a founding member of ArchiAfrika, a nonprofit which looks to improve contemporary architectural history in Africa. She created an exhibition at the Manchester School of Art which explored the Alan Vaughan-Richards archive.

In 2017, Uduku was appointed Professor of Architecture in the Manchester School of Architecture. Here she leads graduate research programmes in urbanism, heritage and conservation. She founded EdenAppLabs, a team of researchers who are looking at the use of mobile apps for environmental design.

== Select publications ==
=== Journal articles ===
- Uduku, Ola (2015). "Designing Schools for Quality: An International, Case Study-based Review" (PDF). International Journal of Educational Development. 44: 56–64. doi:10.1016/j.ijedudev.2015.05.005. hdl:20.500.11820/4ca1a08a-4cc4-44fc-a43c-925361be5a84. ISSN 0738-0593. Document Version: Peer reviewed version
- Uduku, Ola (1999). Beneficial Urban Redevelopment: A Cape Town - Liverpool Comparison. [publisher not identified]. OCLC 870086309.
- Jackson, Iain; Uduku, Ola; Appeaning Addo, Irene; Assasie Opong, Rexford (19 May 2019). "The Volta River Project: Planning, Housing and Resettlement in Ghana, 1950–1965". The Journal of Architecture. 24 (4): 512–548. doi:10.1080/13602365.2019.1643389. ISSN 1360-2365. S2CID 202276595.

=== Books ===
- Uduku, Ola (2018). Learning Spaces in Africa. Routledge. doi:10.4324/9781315576749. ISBN 978-1-315-57674-9.
- Bagaeen, Samer; Uduku, Ola (2015). Beyond Gated Communities. ISBN 978-0-415-74824-7. OCLC 899949706.
- Bagaeen, Samer; Uduku, Ola (2013). Gated Communities: Social Sustainability in Contemporary and Historical Gated Developments. Routledge. ISBN 978-0-415-83041-6. OCLC 829427872.
