= Ezinne Akudo =

Nigerian lawyer and pageant titleholder

- Born: Ezinne Akudo-Anyaoha; 17 May 1990 (age 36); Imo State, Nigeria
- Education: Federal Government Girls' College, Owerri; Abia State University
- Occupation: Lawyer

Ezinne Akudo Anyaoha (born 17 May 1990) is a Nigerian lawyer and beauty queen.

== Early life and education ==
Ezinne Akudo Anyaoha was born on 17 May 1990 in Imo State, southeastern Nigeria. She graduated from Federal Government Girls' College, Owerri, Imo State, and earned a law degree at Abia State University, subsequently completing the mandatory National Youth Service Corp in Ogun State, located in the southwestern region of Nigeria. She Studied and practiced Law for sometime.

== Career ==
In 2013, Akudo beat 31 other contestants to win the Miss Nigeria beauty pageant. She won the star prize of a new car, the sum of three million naira and trip to California.

In 2015, Akudo started her career as a lawyer, and set up a rape crisis centre through her non-governmental organization; The Eight Foundation based in Lagos, Nigeria. A Non- Governmental and Non profit Organization focused on providing psycho-social counselling. She has also been active in campaigning against sexual violence.

In 2018, Akudo was appointed Creative Director of the Miss Nigeria Pageant. She has made registration free and the prize gifts are more substantial now.

== Personal life ==
Ezinne launched her home essential brand (NKASSI), although the brand existed since 2018. The launch unveiled a physical Showroom in Lekki, Lagos and an e-commerce website.
