= Cape Blossom =

Cape in Alaska, United States

Coordinates: 66°44′03″N 162°29′42″W

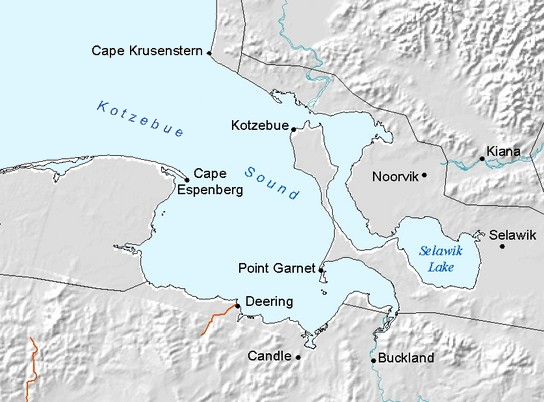
Cape Blossom is a point on the Baldwin Peninsula between the town of Kotzebue and Point Garnet, on Kotzebue Sound

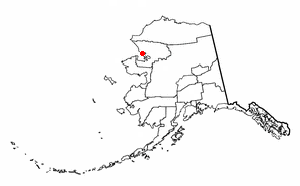
Location of the Cape Blossom in Alaska

Cape Blossom (Iñupiaq: Igluġruat) is a cape located on the Baldwin Peninsula in Alaska which occupies a point that extends southwestwards into Kotzebue Sound, 18 kilometres (11 mi) south of Kotzebue.

This headland was named in 1826 by Royal Navy Captain Frederick William Beechey after his vessel, HMS Blossom.

Cape Blossom in Alaska should not be confused with Cape Blossom on Wrangel Island.
