= Ezinne Ukagwu =

Nigerian economist

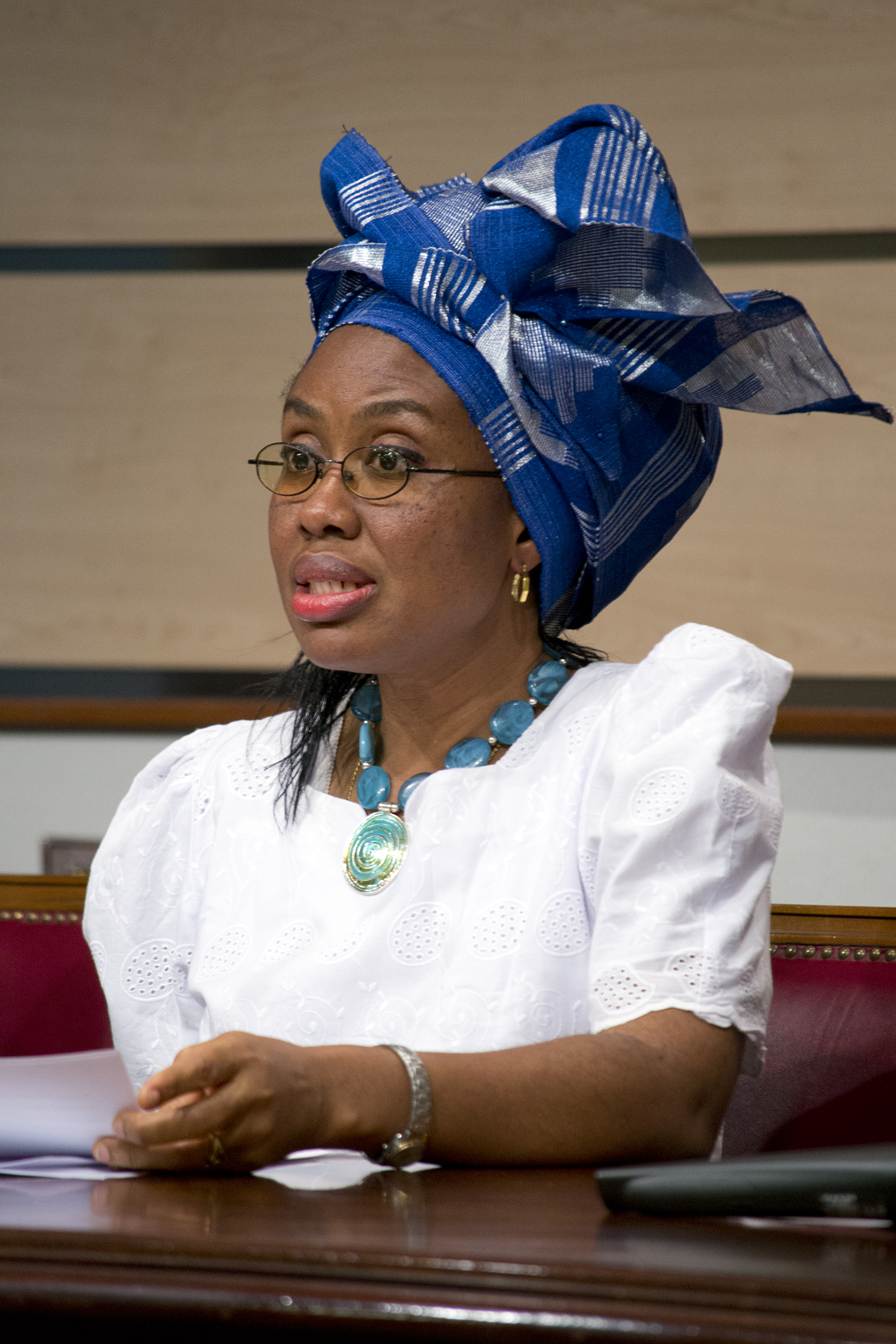
- Born: 1971 (age 54–55)
- Occupation: Economist
- Known for: Promotion of the Iroto Rural Development Centre

Ezinne Ukagwu (born 1971 in Nigeria) is a Nigerian economist and director of the Iroto Rural Development Centre, a women's capacity building centre in Ogún, Nigeria.

== Biography ==
After studying at university, she was instrumental in the opening of the Iroto Professional Training Center in 1985 which later metamorphosed into the Iroto Rural Development Centre in 1992. Since 2002, she runs the Iroto Rural Development Center (Ogún, Nigeria) as its director, where more than 30,000 women have received training from 1985 to 2012. These facilities were possible with the donation of a German woman from Manos Unidas. She has also promoted the Abidagba Clinic hospital, and along with about 25 volunteers they organize hygiene and nutrition courses that have helped reduce child mortality in the area from 60% to 25%. Around Iroto, educational initiatives for women are being promoted and the granting of microcredits for women who open businesses in the area.

In 2012, Ezinne Ukagwu received the Harambee Africa International Prize for the Promotion and Equality of African Women. Ukagwu considers that "the education of African women will change the society of the continent".
