= Blossom (surname) =

Blossom is a surname. Notable people with the surname include:

- Beverly Schmidt Blossom (1926–2014), American modern dancer, choreographer and teacher
- Edward Blossom, an alias of Joseph Smith, and Mrs. Blossom - see List of Joseph Smith's wives
- Eric Blossom, American electrical engineer
- Henry Blossom (1866–1919), American lyricist
- Roberts Blossom (1924–2011), American actor and poet
- Rose Blossom, American actress
