= Blossom Caron =

Canadian photographer (1905–1999)

- Born: Brenda Beryl Harding; 1905; Montreal, Quebec
- Died: 1999 (aged 93–94)
- Known for: photography

Blossom Caron (1905–1999) was a Canadian photographer.

== Life ==
Blossom Caron was born Brenda Beryl Harding in Montreal, Quebec, in 1905. Her father and her husband, Raymond Caron, were both amateur photographers. She was a member of the Montreal Camera Club and published a short history of the club in 1981. Caron and her husband helped organize the Montreal International Salon of Photography, which operated from 1941 to 1969 and the Woman's World Exhibition of Photography at Expo 67. Her photographs appeared in various magazines, including Saturday Night.

Caron died in Montreal in 1999.

Her work is included in the collections of the McCord Museum, Library and Archives Canada and the Smithsonian Institution.
