= Blossom (functional) =

In numerical analysis, a blossom is a functional that can be applied to any polynomial, but is mostly used for Bézier and spline curves and surfaces.

The blossom of a polynomial ƒ, often denoted $\mathcal{B}[f],$ is completely characterised by the three properties:

- It is a symmetric function of its arguments:

$$\mathcal{B}[f](u_1,\dots,u_d) = \mathcal{B}[f]\big(\pi(u_1,\dots,u_d)\big),\,$$

(where π is any permutation of its arguments).

- It is affine in each of its arguments:

$$\mathcal{B}[f](\alpha u + \beta v,\dots) = \alpha\mathcal{B}[f](u,\dots) + \beta\mathcal{B}[f](v,\dots),\text{ when }\alpha + \beta = 1.\,$$

- It satisfies the diagonal property:

$$\mathcal{B}[f](u,\dots,u) = f(u).\,$$
