= Blossom Damania =

American virologist

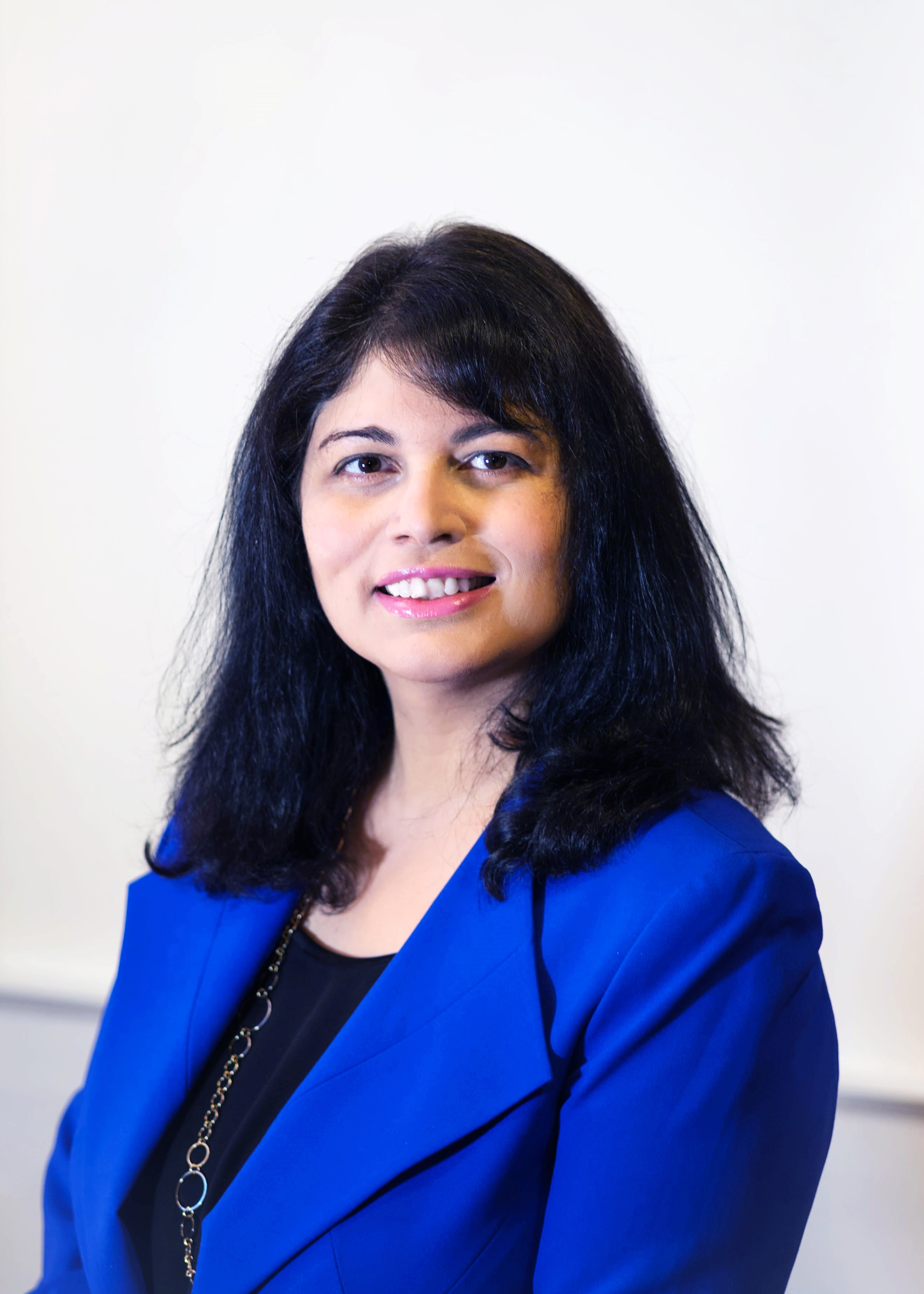

Blossom Damania is a virologist and oncologist at the University of North Carolina at Chapel Hill. She is known for her work on oncogenic viruses that cause human cancer. Damania has been serving as vice dean for research at the UNC Chapel Hill School of Medicine since 2016 and is Chief Scientific Officer at UNC Health, the affiliated healthcare system.

== Life and education ==
Damania received a Bachelor of Arts degree from Mount Holyoke College, MA in biochemistry. She graduated summa cum laude from Mount Holyoke College. She also received a Doctor of Philosophy degree at the University of Pennsylvania in Cell and Molecular Biology in 1998 followed by a postdoctoral fellowship at Harvard Medical School.

== Work ==
Damania was a postdoctoral fellow at Harvard Medical School, MA from 1998 to 2000 where she worked on herpesvirus biology. She received a postdoctoral fellowship from the Cancer Research Institute for this work.

In 2000, Damania started working as an assistant professor at the University of North Carolina at Chapel Hill in the School of Medicine. Damania is a member of the Department of Microbiology & Immunology, Department of Pharmacology, and the Genetics Curriculum at the University of North Carolina at Chapel Hill. The Damania laboratory is part of the Lineberger Comprehensive Cancer Center at the University of North Carolina at Chapel Hill.

Damania was promoted to associate professor of microbiology and immunology in 2006 and full professor in 2011. She is currently the Cary C. Boshamer Distinguished Professor at the University of North Carolina at Chapel Hill. She is the co-leader of the virology program and co-director of the program in global oncology in the Lineberger Comprehensive Cancer Center. She served as assistant dean for research in the School of Medicine and is currently vice dean for research in the School of Medicine at the University of North Carolina at Chapel Hill.

The Damania lab works at the intersection of viruses, cancer biology, and immunity. Damania has published over one hundred publications related to these scientific areas. Expertscape lists Damania as one of the topmost experts in the world on Kaposi sarcoma.

Damania has been the recipient of numerous awards as listed below:

V Foundation for Cancer Research Scholar Award,

American Association for Cancer Research (AACR) Gertrude B. Elion Research Scholar,

American Herpes Foundation Research Scholar Award,

Mary Lyon Alumnae Award, Mount Holyoke College,

Leukemia & Lymphoma Society Scholar,

Jefferson-Pilot Award in Faculty Medicine,

American Heart Association Established Investigator Award,

Burroughs Wellcome Investigator in Infectious Disease,

Ruth and Phillip Hettleman Prize for Artistic and Scholarly Achievement,

Dolph O. Adams Award from the Society for Leukocyte Biology.

Damania is a Kavli Fellow of the National Academy of Sciences, USA, a Fellow of the American Academy of Microbiology, USA, and a Fellow of the American Association for the Advancement of Science (AAAS). In 2020, Damania was elected as Fellow of the American Academy of Arts and Sciences.
