= HMS Blossom =

Two ships of the Royal Navy have borne the name HMS Blossom:

- HMS Blossom (1806) was an 18-gun sloop launched in 1806. She was converted to a survey ship in 1825, was hulked as a lazarette in 1833 and broken up in 1848.
- HMS Blossom (1856) was a Cheerful-class wooden screw gunboat, originally to have been named HMS Careful, but renamed in 1855 prior to her launch on 21 April 1856. She was broken up in 1864.
- HMS Blossom was a screw tank vessel assigned to Gibraltar as a service vessel in May 1902.
