= Blossom Maduafokwa =

Nigerian physician

- Born: Blossom Adaeze Maduafokwa; 26 September 1970; Anambra State, Nigeria
- Education: University of Nigeria, Johns Hopkins Bloomberg School of Public Health, Pan-African University
- Occupation: Public health physician

Blossom Adaeze Maduafokwa (born 26 September 1970) is a Nigerian public health physician executive director and creative director of Blossom's Fitness Hub a platform for health and fitness promotion.

She played a pivotal risk communication role, in reducing the spread of COVID-19. She received recommendations from President Muhammadu Buhari and her efforts earned her an award from Nigerian Books of Record.

== Early life and education ==
Maduafokwa attended the Premier Primary School, Onitsha, Anambra State, before moving to Federal Government Girls' College, Owerri, Imo State. She holds a Bachelor of Medicine, Bachelor of Surgery from University of Nigeria, a Master of Public Health from Johns Hopkins Bloomberg School of Public Health.She earned a master’s degree in healthcare management from Harvard University.

== Career ==
Maduafokwa is the executive director of Tecon Oil Services Limited and founder of The Blossom's Fitness Hub. She is an eight-time full marathon finisher, a licensed Zumba instructor, and a group fitness instructor with an Athletics and Fitness Association of America (AFAA) certification.

Maduafokwa led the campaign in Nigeria to contain the anthrax infection bacteria and the measles outbreak through mass vaccinations and other public health strategies.

She is an advocate of preventive health initiatives that focus on improving health outcomes among women on breast cancer screening and reproductive health services such as cervical cancer prevention.

Blossom Maduafokwa is an advocate for education and women’s empowerment, and the first female medical doctor from Ukpo village, Dunukofia. She has contributed to epidemiology, environmental health, and public health practice. She has also participated in scholarly peer review for BMC Cardiology and BMC Public Health.

== Awards and Recognition ==
Maduafokwa is a Fellow of the West African College of Physicians. She has received an award from Nigerian Books of Record. In 2026, she received recognition from the Guinness World Records for participating in the largest cape-wearing marathon event at the Dubai Marathon. and She also received the Nigeria Magazine Award for healthcare innovation.

== Personal life ==
She is married to Casimir Maduafokwa with whom she shares four children.
