= Tsveta =

Tsveta or Tsvetta or Tzveta is a Bulgarian feminine given name meaning “blossom.”

It may refer to:

- Tsvetta Kaleynska (born 1988), Bulgarian entrepreneur, author, and media personality
- Tsveta Karayancheva (born 1968), Bulgarian engineer and politician
- Tzveta Kousseva (born 1989), Bulgarian Olympic gymnast
