= List of Powerpuff Girls Z characters =

The following is a list of characters who appear in Powerpuff Girls Z, an anime version of The Powerpuff Girls, including new characters and alternate versions of original characters.

== Main characters ==
Unlike their original counterparts, the girls as portrayed here are ordinary eighth graders who are not related to each other or the Professor. Instead of always being superheroes, they have the power to transform into the Powerpuff Girls Z. In the English dub, they are called Blossom, Bubbles and Buttercup regardless of whether they are transformed or not.

Momoko Akatsutsumi (赤堤 ももこ, Akazutsumi Momoko) / Hyper Blossom (ハイパー・ブロッサム, Haipā Burossamu)

Voiced by: Emiri Katō (Japanese); Nicole Bouma (English)
The self-proclaimed leader of the Powerpuff Girls Z, who has pink eyes and orange hair worn with a red bow. She has a younger sister named Kuriko. She primarily wields a yo-yo, but can also use her bow as a weapon. She loves sugary foods and is ditzy and prone to crushes and romantic fantasies; she also plans to get married in the future. She is very familiar with the magical girl genre as well as anime and sentai and is considered a "hero maniac", especially by Kaoru. She was the first to encounter Mojo Jojo at the park after buying candy. As the team's leader, she tries her best to protect Tokyo City and help her friends. She can be clever and crafty when needed, usually being the first to come up with a plan to trick or defeat a monster. Her theme color is pink, or red in the English dub, and she is represented by hearts.

Miyako Gōtokuji (豪徳寺 みやこ, Gōtokuji Miyako) / Rolling Bubbles (ローリング・バブルス, Rōringu Baburusu)

Voiced by: Nami Miyahara (Japanese); Maryke Hendrikse (English)
The second member of the team, who has blue eyes and lemon-yellow hair held with a sky-blue hair clip and worn in pigtails curled into ringlets, who primarily wields a bubble wand. Compared to her original counterpart, who is known for being the most childish of the three, Miyako is more mature and often acts as the mediator to her teammates. She is also compassionate and gentle, possessing a love for animals and her favorite doll, Octi. However, she is the ditziest member of the team, as she often appears to be clueless and does not seem to fully understand her powers. She is also polite, as she uses honorifics at the end of names and ends most sentences with "desu wa". Because of her love for shopping and fashion, she seems to be popular among her male classmates. While she is seemingly oblivious to others' love for her, she has a crush on a boy named Takaaki (Cody) since she was six years old. Her theme color is blue and she is represented by bubbles.

Kaoru Matsubara (松原 かおる, Matsubara Kaoru) / Powered Buttercup (パワード・バターカップ, Pawādo Batākappu)

Voiced by: Machiko Kawana (Japanese); Kelly Metzger (English)
The third and final member of the team, who has green eyes and dark grey hair worn with two green hair clips, who primarily wields a giant mallet. She lives with her parents and her two brothers, with her father being a professional wrestler. Like her original counterpart, she is a tomboy and the most easily enraged of the three. Kaoru is known at school for being athletic, as she participates in several activities, including tennis and martial arts, and spends time watching sports on television. She is particularly good at soccer due to her strengthened determination after receiving new soccer cleats when she was younger. This may be part of the reason why she has many fangirls, much to her dismay. She dislikes girly things, especially skirts, and speaks with a hard and masculine edge, rarely using honorifics when speaking. However, underneath her tough exterior, she is kind and has a sense of humor. Her theme color is green and she is represented by stars.

== Supporting characters ==
=== Allies ===
Professor Utonium (ユートニウム博士, Yūtoniumu-Hakase)
Voiced by: Taiten Kusunoki (Japanese); Louis Chirillo (English)
A professor who, like his original counterpart, treats the girls like his own family, despite them being unrelated in the series, and is close to the Mayor and Miss Bellum. Despite being gentle and serious, he can sometimes be immature. His experiments with Chemical X, which were to find a way to change its chemical properties, led to the creation of Chemical Z, which his son, Ken Kitazawa, inadvertently unleashed upon the city. He has created several inventions throughout the series; the most important being the Chemical Z Particle Ray, which allows him to turn those affected by the lights back to normal, but does not prevent recurring transformations and does not work on all black light victims. He seems to be aware of the effect Ken's lack of a mother has had on him, assuming that it had caused him to be a bully to the girls. In episode 37, when the Powerpuff Girls are "grounded" from using their powers for a day after they have to take a test in school, he fills in for them, donning an exosuit with a laser gun and rocket pack and calling himself "Professor Puff Z". He also appears to have a mecha resembling Professor Puff Z, which he uses against the Mojo Robo. Although usually unsuccessful in battle, he is able to defeat Mojo Jojo, Fuzzy Lumpkins, and the Amoeba Boys. At the end of the episode, he, Ken, and Peach proclaim themselves as their own team, "Powerpuff Boys Z".

Ken Kitazawa (北沢 ケン, Kitazawa Ken)
Voiced by: Makiko Ohmoto (Japanese); Cathy Weseluck (English)
Professor Utonium's eight-year-old son, who is based on Kid Utonium from the original series, as revealed in the special edition booklets. His attempt to use Chemical Z to blast a glacier and return the weather back to normal resulted in the explosion of several lights, which affected those who came in contact with it and led to the creation of several villains but also gave the girls their powers. He sees the girls as older sisters and cares for them deeply. He also acts more mature than them despite being younger and has a more advanced education he receives from Utonium, resulting in him earning his PhD at an early age. He later attends school to gain social skills and make friends. Although he finds school to be boring, he has made several friends, including Jou, who was originally his rival, and Kuriko, Momoko's young sister. He interchanges between calling Professor Utonium "Dad" and "Professor" depending on the situation, but often calls him by the wrong honorific. Episode 26 reveals that his mother is away as she works on a space station, but thanks to the girls and Santa Claus, whom he initially believed did not exist, he is able to communicate with her through the lab's monitor. In episode 37, when the girls are "grounded" from using their powers for a day when they have to take a test in school, Ken fills in for them, calling himself "Kamikaze Ken Z". Despite lacking powers, he uses his intelligence along with traps and other props as weapons when he defends their lab from the Gangreen Gang, ultimately driving them off by tricking them into drinking bottles of hot sauce. which they thought were containers of Chemical Z.

Peach (ピーチ, Pīchi) / Poochie
Voiced by: Tomoko Kaneda (Japanese); Matt Hill (ep 1-37a), Simon Hill (ep 37b-52) (English)
Ken's pet robot dog, who gained increased intelligence and the ability to speak after being affected by a white Chemical Z ray. Peach's shout prompts the girls to transform either in person or through a long-distance communication device, although a later modification to their compacts allows them to transform on their own, and can re-summon their powers when they are drained. Peach is also capable of sniffing out those who affected by the black rays, white rays, or Him's black particles, which are stored in his data banks for later reference. This ability, however, is hindered if his target is wearing heavy cosmetics, such as with Sedusa. As well, he sniffs and identifies others more clearly than other dogs, even when someone's appearance has been completely changed.

Mayor Mayer (メイヤー市長, Meiyā Shichō)
Voiced by: Hideyuki Tanaka (Japanese); Alec Willows (English)
The mayor of New Townsville (Tokyo City), whose design differs from his original counterpart in that he is of normal height and does not wear a monocle or top hat. Although to a lesser extent than his original counterpart, he is childish and has a short attention span; he also loves sweets. He seems to worry quite a lot when the girls are fighting and wishes that they could cause less damage to the city. His younger brother, who is the principal of the school, allowed him and Miss Bellum to rearrange the classes so the girls would be in the same class. However, the Mayor and the Principal do not always get along and often argue, with him having to deal with him when the girls are not doing well in class due to skipping class to save the city.
Sara Bellum (ミス・ベラム, Misu Beramu)
Voiced by: Yōko Kawanami (Japanese); Nicole Oliver (English)
Mayor Mayer's assistant, who, unlike her original counterpart, has blonde rather than red hair. She usually covers her face with a tablet computer which has lipstick imprinted on it. Like in the original series, she does most of the mayor's work for him and is the brains of the operation.
Miss Keane (キーン先生, Kīn-sensei)
Voiced by: Tomoko Akiya (Japanese); Tabitha St. Germain (English)
The girls' teacher, whose male students love for her beauty although her female students do not like her as much, especially Princess Morbucks. Like her original counterpart, she is kind and patient.
Natsuki Urawa (浦和ナツキ, Urawa Natsuki)
A character who appears exclusively in the manga. A popular kid in school who Momoko has a crush on, though he finds her annoying despite admiring her alter ego, Blossom.

=== Family members ===
Kuriko Akatsutsumi (赤堤 くりこ, Akatsutsumi Kuriko)
Voiced by: Chiwa Saitō (Japanese); Erin Mathews (English)
Momoko's eight-year-old sister, who like her is energetic and loves the sentai/hero genre. She is independent and likes to pretend to be a heroine, as she admires the Powerpuff Girls Z and wishes to be like them. She admires Rolling Bubbles and Powered Buttercup, but shows little favor for Hyper Blossom who she is unaware is actually Momoko. She appears to be quite interested in Ken, especially after realizing that he knows her sister. Similarly, Ken seems interested in her because of her resemblance to Blossom.
Kiyoko Gotokuji (豪徳寺清子, Gōtokuji Kiyoko)
Voiced by: Misa Watanabe (Japanese); Cathy Weseluck (English)
Miyako's grandmother, who she lives with in a large traditional-looking house. She is gentle and often sentimental, but she can also be strict when it comes to manners. Her eyes are never seen open, as they are closed to portray a happy feeling.
Tokio Matsubara (松原 時夫, Matsubara Tokio)
Voiced by: Keiichi Sonobe (Japanese); Brian Drummond (English)
Kaoru's father, a professional wrestler known as the Masked Mexico and a loving family man who is never seen without his mask. He left for Mexico when Kaoru was young to study the art of the luchador after experiencing a losing streak that nearly cost him his career. His teacher was severely injured in what is implied to be his final match. He was given his teacher's mask, which he never removes except when taking a shower, which has caused Kaoru to forget what his face looks like. After he wins the match against Giant Panda Mask, Kaoru finally gets to see his face for the first time since before he left for Mexico, which is described as being 'very handsome'.
Michiru Matsubara (松原満, Matsubara Michiru)
Voiced by: Yūko Minaguchi (Japanese); Jillian Michaels (English)
Kaoru's mother, who is gentle and a good cook.
Dai Matsubara (松原 ダイ, Matsubara Dai)
Voiced by: Mayumi Yamaguchi (Japanese); David Hurwitz (English)
Kaoru's older brother.
Shou Matsubara (松原 ショウ, Matsubara Shou)
Voiced by: Kanako Sunakura (Japanese); Kathleen Barr (English)
Kaoru's younger brother.
Great Edo ChakiChaki Girls (大江戸ちゃきちゃき娘, Ōedo Chakichaki Musume; lit. 'Genuine Great Edoite Girls" or "Leading Girls of the Great Edo')
Voiced by: Emiri Katō, Nami Miyahara, Machiko Kawana (Japanese); Nicole Bouma, Maryke Hendrikse, Kelly Metzger (English)
Three girls, Momo (もも), Omiya (おみや) and Okou (おこう), who, as revealed in episode 30, were the predecessors to the modern-day Powerpuff Girls Z and protected Edo from Him, with Edo eventually becoming Tokyo City. When Him was terrorizing Edo's citizens, a man named Kennai Hiraga, who is modeled after Hiraga Gennai, created "Chemical X", which changed their appearance, giving them new hairstyles similar to their present day counterparts and costumes resembling kimonos, as well as their own powers and weapons. The three faced and successfully defeated Him by exploiting his weakness to the cold, and together with Hiraga, drained his powers and sealed his body in a coffin. Because of this, Him harbors a deep hatred towards the Great Edo ChakiChaki Girls, which he directs towards the Powerpuff Girls Z for their resemblance to them. Like to the Steamypuff Girls from the original, they both stopped a great villain from a previous era.

== Villains ==
=== Returning villains ===
Mojo Jojo (モジョ・ジョジョ)
Voiced by: Masashi Ebara (Japanese); Michael Dobson (English)
A zoo monkey who decided to seek revenge on humanity for making fun of him after the ray from Chemical Z caused him to gain human intelligence. He is the same size as his original counterpart, as his giant cape conceals his small figure. Despite this, he is physically more powerful than him, as he can fly and attacks faster. He frequently displays an immature attitude and makes childish flaws in his plans. While the original Mojo was portrayed as a competent and threatening villain, he often serves as comic relief, with the girls seeing him as more of a nuisance than a dangerous enemy. He also does not repeat himself redundantly as the original Mojo does, but does end most sentences with saying his name.
Him (カレ, Kare)
Voiced by: Ryūsei Nakao (Japanese); Mark Oliver (English)
The most powerful enemy of the series and its main antagonist. He is a demon who is the embodiment of chaos itself. In ancient times, he sought to bring about the destruction of Edo, but the Great Edo ChakiChaki Girls defeated him by exploiting his weakness to the cold and then sealed him away. However, when Ken destroyed the icebergs in the bay of New Townsville, black lights were scattered across it, giving birth to many villains and reawakening Him. Prior to being fully revived, he released a dust that was responsible for producing some villains.
Fuzzy Lumpkins (ファジー・ラムキンス, Fajī Ramukinsu)
Voiced by: Shirō Saitō (Japanese); Scott McNeil (English)
He is as rude and destructive as his original counterpart, but prior to rampaging is shown to be helping an old man and signing an autograph for a fan who liked his banjo playing. Like Mojo Jojo, he ends most of his sentences with "de mon da". He has a crush on Ms. Bellum.
Himeko Shirogane (白金姫子, Shirogane Himeko) / Princess (プリンセス, Purinsesu)
Voiced by: Chigusa Ikeda (Japanese); Kelly Sheridan (English)
A bratty rich kid in the girls' class whose powers are used based on her wanting to be recognized by people. Once she is back to normal, she does not recall any events that occurred while she was a villain. She has a strong dislike for Momoko, Miyako and Kaoru and often tries to get them into trouble, but occasionally acts like a friend to them. She has an older sister named Miko, who her parents prefer as she does everything better than her. While she is somewhat jealous of Miko, she loves her and is excited when she visits. Unlike her original counterpart, her parents are shown and her mother is alive. She has a cat named Sapphire, whose scream causes her transformation into Princess.
The Gangreen Gang (ギャングリーンギャング, Gyangurīn Gyangu)
Voiced by: Mitsuaki Madono, Kōki Miyata, Keiko Yamamoto, Kōichi Tōchika, Toshiharu Sakurai (Japanese); Andrew Francis, Tabitha St. Germain, Maryke Hendrikse, Peter New, Richard Ian Cox (English)
A group of troublemakers whose members are Ace (エース, Ēsu), Snake (スネーク, Sunēku), Lil Arturo (リトル・アートロ, Ritoru Āturo), Grubber (グラバー, Gurabā) and Big Billy (ビッグ・ビリー, Biggu Birī).
The Amoeba Boys (アメーバボーイズ, Amība Bōizu)
Voiced by: Minoru Inaba, Naoki Tatsuta, Sakiko Uran (Japanese); Richard Ian Cox, Brian Drummond, Tabitha St. Germain (English)
A group of amoeba brought to life by the black light. Their members are Silk Hat (シルクハット, Shiruku Hatto; Top Hat in the dub), Poncho (ポンチョ) and Lady (レディ, Redi; Violet in the dub), who is actually a girl.
Sakurako Kintoki (金時 桜子, Kintoki Sakurako) / Sedusa (セデューサ, Sedūsa)
Voiced by: Rumi Shishido (Japanese); Rebecca Shoichet (English)
A shy girl who runs a candy store and has a crush on a boy named Souichiro (荘一郎) Voiced by: Kappei Yamaguchi (Japanese); Sam Vincent (English), whose jealousy towards him leads her to be hit by the black light, transforming her into Sedusa whenever she puts on lipstick. As Sedusa, she can wear makeup to disguise herself as others and use her hair like tentacles, traits shared with her original counterpart, but unlike her, she is in love with Souichiro rather than Professor Utonium.
Rowdyruff Boys Z (ラウディラフボーイズ, Raudi Rafu Bōizu)
Voiced by: Reiko Kiuchi, Touko Aoyama, Yukiko Tamaki (Japanese); Alberto Ghisi, Aidan Drummond, Kathleen Barr (English)
Brick (ブリック, Burikku), Boomer (ブーマー, Būmā) and Butch (ブッチ, Bucchi) are created by Mojo based on the DNA on the girls' personal items, which form the basis of the Rowdyruff Boys' weapons. Brick's weapon is Blossom's heart twisty straw, which he can shoot fireballs from, Boomer's weapon is Bubbles' used cotton bud, and Butch's weapon is Buttercup's smelly gym sock, which he throws like a boomerang.

=== Original villains ===
Michel (ミッシェル, Missheru)
Voiced by: Junichi Suwabe (Japanese); Paul Dobson (English)
Michel, also known by his alter ego Gigi the Great, is an effeminate hairdresser with strange tastes in hair. He has a teddy bear that when wound up, compliments Michel and tells him that he is great. After the teddy bear is hit by the black light, it grants him powers of hypnosis to make customers accept his eccentric hairstyles. The cause of his transformation is hearing compliments from the teddy bear; therefore, to prevent further transformations, Ken and the girls replace the teddy bear's old recording with a new one that insults Michel.
Miko Shirogane (白金 神子, Shirogane Miko)
Voiced by: Mariko Kouda (Japanese); Chantal Strand (English)
Miko is Himeko's older sister who likes to stand out, which has caused her to be jealous of her; despite this, they do care for each other. When she gets jealous of the Powerpuff Girls' fame, she develops a suit that temporarily gives her powers, calling herself Shirogane Z to upstage them.
Takaaki Ayagai / Takaaki Morimoto (鮎貝 高明, Ayagai Takaaki)
Voiced by: Daisuke Kishio (Japanese); Paul Dobson (beast form), Kathleen Barr (human form) (English)
A boy around the age of the girls, who has known Miyako since they were six years old. She has had a crush on him since they met, as he protected her from bullies at the park and they blew bubbles together. He was stricken with an unknown illness (broken ankle in the English dub) and since then has used a wheelchair. In episode 12, he is hit by the black light, which originally improves his condition before turning him into a werewolf. When the Girls Z first encounter him, Miyoko recognizes him as Takaaki when he blows bubbles. Upon embracing him, however, Takaaki flees. Later, in episode 48, Takaaki encounters Miyoko again and, after she detransforms, he finally remembers her as his childhood friend. Miyoko then returns Takaaki to normal by putting the black energy into bubbles. Since then, the two remain in contact. with Miyoko visiting Takaaki in the hospital.
Alpha (アルファ, Arufa) and Beta (ベータ, Bēta)
Voiced by: Motoko Kumai and Takashi Kondō (Japanese); Lyon Smith and Cameron Ansell (English)
A pair of androids who are the main antagonists in the manga. They were created by a pair of scientists to act as their children, but were stolen by a group of thieves who reprogrammed them to take revenge on humanity before being hit by the black lights.
