= Blossom (brig) =

British brig

History

United Kingdom
- Name: Blossom
- Route: Newcastle upon Tyne-Nieuwediep
- Out of service: 19 October 1863
- Fate: wrecked on Haaks Bank the Netherlands on 19 October 1963

General characteristics
- Type: Brig

Blossom was a 19th-century British brig. Thomas Oliver was the captain of the ship. It regularly sailed with a cargo of coal to the Netherlands. On 19 October 1863 the ship wrecked on Haaks Bank, the Netherlands.

== Fate ==
While on a voyage from Newcastle upon Tyne, Northumberland to Nieuwediep, the Netherlands with a load of coal, the ship wrecked during the evening of 19 October 1863 at Haaks Bank, the Netherlands. While the ship shattered and sank, six crew members were able to get into the lifeboat of the ship. They were able to reach Onrust, a sandbank off the coast of Texel, and could not row further due to fatigue. They also failed to reach the mainland the next morning and were driven away by the water. Their boat, which was in distress, was however seen by people from the mainland. Jan Stol, Klaas Molenaar, Jacob Stol and Lodewijk Schendelaar were able to rescue them with their punt by 9 am.
