= Aly Jetha =

Canadian children's television producer

- Born: Zambia
- Education: University of British Columbia, Berkeley Law School
- Occupations: Entrepreneur, lawyer, consultant
- Known for: Big Bad Boo
- Spouse: Shabnam Rezaei

Aly Jetha is a Canadian children's television creator, producer, director and writer, as well as co-founder and CEO of Big Bad Boo Studios and Oznoz.com, a multilingual educational VOD service for children.

== Early life and education ==
Jetha was born in Zambia and immigrated to Canada with his family in 1974. He grew up in Vancouver, British Columbia, where he graduated from St. George's School. In 1992, Jetha earned a Bachelor of Arts degree in political science from the University of British Columbia. After working for the United Nations and representing Canada at Parliamentarians for Global Action, he pursued legal studies and obtained a Juris Doctor degree from Berkeley Law School at the University of California, specialising in corporate and international law.

== Career ==
Jetha became a member of the California Bar and worked as a management consultant at Bain & Company. He later shifted into entrepreneurship, founding four companies in industries such as semiconductors and telecommunications.

In 2006, Jetha co-founded Norooz Productions with his wife, Shabnam Rezaei, which later evolved into Big Bad Boo in 2007. The studio specializes in creating multicultural children's content, using entertainment to teach culture and language.

Jetha has produced children's' cartoon series 1001 Nights, Mixed Nutz, 16 Hudson, Galapagos X and the Hulu Original series The Bravest Knight, the first children's series with an LGBT protagonist which featured all-star cast including RuPaul, Wanda Sykes, Christine Baranski, T. R. Knight, Bobby Moynihan, Storm Reid and Wilson Cruz.

In 2019, Jetha also produced the short film Balloon Girl, which was a finalist in the PBS Online Film Fest. Set in Stadtpark, Vienna, the short film was part of London-based Hope Works Project, a series of short films to inspire kindness, understanding and hope in children around the world.

In 2020, The Bravest Knight won the GLAAD Media Award for Outstanding Kids and Family Programming as well as the MIP Jr. Diversity in Entertainment Awards. He was named one of Washington State's Top 40 Under 40 in 2002 and again in Vancouver's Top 40 Under 40 in 2009.

=== UNICEF and international development work ===
He has been involved with UNICEF and received the WISE Award for his contributions to educational initiatives. In 2018, he was inducted into the Million Lives Collective for his work that improved the lives of over one million people living on less than $5 per day.

== Filmography ==
Year	Title	Credit
2023	Galapagos X	Producer
2019	The Bravest Knight	Producer
2019	Lili & Lola	Producer
2020	16 Hudson	Producer
2010–2015	1001 Nights	Producer
2009	Mixed Nutz	Producer
2006	Babak & Friends - A First Norooz	Producer
TBD	Balloon Girl	Producer

== See also ==
- Big Bad Boo
