= American International School Vienna =

Location
- Vienna; Austria; 48.2535°N 16.2873°E

Information
- Type: Private
- Established: 1959
- Director: Dr. Kathy Miner
- Head teacher: Kathy Miner
- Grades: PreK - Grade 12 (Age 4-18)
- Student to teacher ratio: 8:1
- Color: Green/Grey
- Athletics conference: ISST, DVAC
- Mascot: Knight
- Website: www.ais.at

The American International School Vienna (AISV) is a non-profit international school in Vienna, Austria. AIS Vienna is accredited by the Middle States Association of Schools and Colleges, USA, and the Council of International Schools, and is recognized by the Austrian Ministry of Education.

== Students ==
AIS Vienna serves approximately eight hundred students from over seventy countries, with about 30% American and about 30% Austrian. The school is divided into three divisions—Elementary (Pre-Kindergarten to Grade 5), Middle (Grade 6, 7, and 8), and High School (Grade 9 to Grade 12). The typical class has twenty students, with many language classes considerably smaller.

The average stay at AIS Vienna is 3 years, with approximately 200 new students admitted each year.

The international parent community is predominantly affiliated with embassies, international organizations, and international corporations. Local parents tend to work in private businesses or such professions as medicine and law.

== Faculty ==
Each of the three academic divisions is headed by a principal. In addition, the senior leadership team includes the three division Principals, the Director, the Director of Teaching & Learning, the Director of Events, the Director of Technology, the Director of Admissions, the Human Resources Manager, and the Business Manager. There are also trained and experienced counselors in each of the three divisions, resource staff, and librarians for the Elementary and Secondary schools. A full-time nurse-practitioner oversees the school's health unit.

The school is divided into several areas: the elementary school, the middle school, the high school, the villa, and the gyms. The school has 4 gyms, one field, two libraries, one theater and one amphitheater. There are 17 staircases in the building and one elevator.

The teaching faculty numbers over 100 individuals. Over 70% of teachers hold advanced degrees, with several having earned doctorates. A substantial majority are U.S. citizens, but the school does have teachers of other nationalities, including faculty from Europe, Canada, the Middle East, the Far East, and South America.

AIS Vienna faculty range in age from 25-65, with an average and median age of about 46. The average stay of a teacher at AIS Vienna is over ten years. Notable faculty include author Jonathan Carroll.

== Facilities ==
AIS Vienna's 11 acre (4.5 ha) campus overlooks the city and is adjacent to the Vienna Woods and the Neustift vineyards. Made up of seven adjoining buildings, the campus features libraries, a cafeteria, sports facilities, eight science laboratories, art and music studios, a theater, an outdoor amphitheater, and an outdoor classroom. The city of Vienna makes up the ‘extended campus’.

The land for the school was bought by the U.S. government in the late 1950s, using U.S. government funds obtained through the Marshall Plan. The school occupies the premises in perpetuity. The school is built along a sloping hillside. AIS Vienna is not easily accessed by students or parents with physical challenges; however, ongoing efforts are being made to implement enhancements that will address these accessibility concerns in the future.

== Notable alumni ==
- Left Boy, Austrian musician
- Oskar Deutsch (born 1963), Austrian entrepreneur and President of the Jewish Community of Vienna
- James Herseyy, Austrian-American musician
- Niko Kranjcar, Croatian football player
- Alexander Pschill, Austrian actor
- Shabnam Rezaei, Iranian-American children's television writer, producer and director of Big Bad Boo Studios
- Thomas G. Stemberg, American businessman and inventor, co-founder of Staples Inc
- Sebastian Stan, Romanian-American actor
