= Oznoz =

Children's video on demand service

- Website type: Video on demand
- Founded: September 26, 2009; 16 years ago
- Area served: North America
- Key people: Shabnam Rezaei; Aly Jetha
- Website: www.oznoz.com

Oznoz is a subscription video on demand service with the focus on multilingual children's TV programming. Oznoz carries a library of 4000 hours of programming via launch, and exclusive rights to libraries such as Sesame Workshop, Mattel Creations, and Corus' Nelvana in many different languages rather than English. Oznoz's languages include Arabic, Chinese, English, French, Hindi, Korean, Kurdish, Japanese, Persian, Urdu, Spanish, and non-dialogue shows. Oznoz content can be accessed as an over-the-top service through the channel's website and iPad and Android apps.

== Distribution ==
Oznoz is available online, mobile, smart TVs, and other devices. Via launch, the service is available to subscribers in Canada and the United States.

== Content ==
The service is oriented primarily towards bilingual families who speak two or more languages. Content includes television series, films and shorts such as Barney, Thomas the Tank Engine, Bob the Builder, Pingu, Babar, Super Why!, 1001 Nights, Franklin, Pororo, Be Ponkickies, Sesame Street, Elmo's World and other original shows from foreign broadcast partners such as Al Jazeera Children's Channel, TV Tokyo, IRIB and others.
