= Shabnam Rezaei =

Iranian-American children's show creator and producer

- Occupations: Children's television screen writer and producer
- Notable work: 16 Hudson; The Bravest Knight; 1001 Nights

Shabnam Rezaei is a children's television creator, director, producer and co-founder of Big Bad Boo Studios and VOD service Oznoz. She created the TVOKids Original series Galapagos X, starring Odd Squad actress Millie Davis as Orchid, Gavin MacIver-Wright as Quinn Croc, Battlestar Galactica star Alessandro Juliani and Riverdale star Nathalie Boltt as the power-hungry mogul Doc Croc. Shabnam is the director and producer of Hulu Original series The Bravest Knight, the first children's series with an LGBT protagonist. The all-star cast includes T. R. Knight, Bobby Moynihan, Storm Reid, RuPaul, Wanda Sykes, Wilson Cruz, and Christine Baranski. The Bravest Knight won the 2020 GLAAD Media Award for Outstanding Kids and Family Programming.

In 2019, Rezaei directed the short film Balloon Girl, which was a finalist in the PBS Online Film Fest. Set in Stadtpark, Vienna, the short film was part of the worldwide, London-based Hope Works Project, a series of short films to inspire kindness, understanding and hope in children around the world.

Rezaei is the creator of the animated preschool series 16 Hudson, which features a family with two dads, and families from various backgrounds such as Ireland, India, China and Iran. The series is based on Lili & Lola a mini-series created by Rezaei in 2015. 16 Hudson currently airs on TVOKids, Ici Radio-Canada Télé, Knowledge Network, Amazon Prime Video, Discovery Kids, TFO, Oznoz, Vme Kids, and Rádio e Televisão de Portugal with Season 2 introducing a refugee family.

16 Hudson won the Mipcom Diversify TV Award in 2021 in Cannes, France, beating out Disney Junior's Mira, Royal Detective and the CBeebies' JoJo & Gran Gran in Preschool category. In 2022, Lili & Lola was nominated for the Mipcom Diversify TV Award in the Preschool category.

In 2022, Rezaei greenlit her climate change series Galapagos X with public broadcasters TVOKids and Mediacorp Singapore among other commissioning partners.

== Career ==
Rezaei created and produced 1001 Nights, an animated children's series based on stories from One Thousand and One Nights. Every episode opens with the famous storyteller Shahrzad, King Shahryar, and kids Donyazad and Shahzaman. The series won three Leo Awards for Best Animation Program or Series, Best Screenwriting in an Animation Program or Series, and Best Overall Sound in an Animation Program or Series.

Her first television series, Mixed Nutz, promotes diversity and multiculturalism through a group of friends from Iran, Korea, Cuba, Austria, and India. The series was a continuation of their work Babak and Friends, and included the voice talents of Shohreh Aghdashloo, Parviz Sayyad, Ali Pourtash, and Catherine Bell.

Her directorial work includes 16 Hudson, Lili & Lola,1001 Nights, and Mixed Nutz.

Rezaei is also the creator of Persian cultural online magazine Persian Mirror.

== Personal life ==
Shabnam was born in Tehran, Iran and grew up in Vienna, Austria, where she attended the American International School of Vienna. She studied Computer Science Engineering and German Literature at the University of Pennsylvania in Philadelphia. She later obtained an MBA from the New York University Stern School of Business. She speaks five languages.

== Filmography ==
=== Television ===
Year	Title	Notes
2022 - 2024	Galapagos X	Creator, Director, Executive Producer, Showrunner
2018 - 2024	16 Hudson	Creator, Director, Executive Producer, Writer (2 episodes)
2018 - 2020	The Bravest Knight	Creator, Director, Executive Producer
2020-2022	ABC with Kenny G	Creator, Director, Executive Producer
2015-2022	Lili & Lola	Creator, Director, Executive Producer, Writer (8 episodes)
2012-2013	1001 Nights	Creator, Director, Executive Producer, Writer (2 episodes)
2009-2010	Mixed Nutz	Producer
2005	Babak and Friends	Producer
