= A Monster Christmas =

- Written by: Samantha Shear; Michael Shear
- Directed by: Chad Van De Keere
- Starring: Isabella Acres; Drake Bell; Emilio Estevez; Ray Liotta
- Country of origin: United States
- Original language: English

Production
- Running time: 43 minutes

Original release
- Release: 2012

A Monster Christmas or Abominable Christmas is a 2012 American made-for-television animated children's film. Directed by Chad Van De Keere for Kickstart Productions, it features the voices of Isabella Acres, Drake Bell, Emilio Estevez and Ray Liotta. The film is about two young abominable snow children who escape the capture of an evil scientist and take up residence with a family. The film was screened at the 2013 Foyle Film Festival.

== Cast ==
The following actors provided their voice for the characters:

- Ariel Winter as Abby Abominable
- Isabella Acres as Lilly Winterbottom
- Nolan Gould as Adam Abominable
- Drake Bell as Matt Winterbottom
- Ray Liotta as Abominable Dad
- Emilio Estevez as Mr. Winterbottom
- Matthew Lillard as Dogcatcher
- Jane Lynch as Margaret Knowhow

== Reception ==
Cleaver Patterson, writing for Starburst Magazine wrote: "It's quite charming, with its story of a hapless father doing his best to bring up his unruly offspring single-handedly after his wife has died. The characters however appear stereotypically irksome – an overprotective parent, feisty young daughter, know-it-all older brother, as well as bumbling baddies and buffoonish representatives of the law – whilst the storyline offers little opportunity other than to involve everyone in endless misunderstanding-induced chases. The animation – though by no means as bad as the recent Scottish abomination Sir Billi – is not much above the standard you'd expect from a made-for-television film, which A Monster Christmas was originally intended as."
