= Chad Van De Keere =

Canadian-born director

- Occupation: Director
- Known for: Being Ian, "Abominable Christmas", 1001 Nights (TV series), Dear Dracula

Chad Van De Keere is a Canadian director who currently resides in Vancouver, British Columbia, Canada. He is known for directing animated television series as well as animated films primarily targeted for children and families. He has worked in animation since 1994. Started in animation as an animator and layout artist. He has worked in several creative positions throughout his career, such as special effects animator, designer as well as an editor before he became a director.

== Filmography ==
=== Director ===
==== Movies ====
- Abominable Christmas
- Being Ian: An IanConvenient Truth
- Dear Dracula

==== Series ====
- 1001 Nights
- Being Ian
- SuperKitties

==== Episodic ====
- Planet Sheen

=== Assistant director ===
==== Series ====
- Teenage Mutant Ninja Turtles (2012 TV series)

== Awards and nominations ==
Year	Association	Award category	Notes	Result
2008	Leo Awards	Best Direction/Storyboarding in an Animation Program or Series	Chad Van De Keere for Being Ian episode "everykid 13"	Nominated
2010	Leo Awards	Best Direction/Storyboarding in an Animation Program or Series	Chad Van De Keere for 1001 Nights (TV series) episode "What's Yours Is Mine"	Nominated
2011	Leo Awards	Best Direction/Storyboarding in an Animation Program or Series	Chad Van De Keere for 1001 Nights (TV series) episode "The Boy Who Cried Science"	Nominated

== Trivia ==
Chad has been a certified PADI rescue diver and open water instructor since 1991.
