= Being Ian =

Canadian animated television series

- Genre: Comedy
- Created by: Ian James Corlett
- Developed by: Bonita Siegel
- Directed by: Andy Bartlett (season 1); Josh Mepham (seasons 1–2); Chad Van De Keere (season 3)
- Starring: Richard Ian Cox; Louis Chirillo; Patricia Drake; Ty Olsson; Matt Hill; David Kaye; Dexter Bell; Tabitha St. Germain; Shannon Chan-Kent; Ian James Corlett; Christina Jastrzembska
- Theme music composer: Ian James Corlett
- Opening theme: "Being Ian Theme Song" by Brian "Hoot" Gibson and Ian James Corlett
- Ending theme: "Being Ian Ending Theme Song" by Brian "Hoot" Gibson and Ian James Corlett
- Composers: Brian "Hoot" Gibson; Hal Beckett
- Country of origin: Canada
- Original language: English
- No. of seasons: 3
- No. of episodes: 63

Production
- Executive producers: Chris Bartleman; Blair Peters
- Producers: Blair Peters (seasons 1–2); Kathy Antonsen Rocchio (seasons 1–2); Charmaine Lazaro (season 3)
- Running time: 22 minutes
- Production company: Studio B Productions (Note: As Studio B (Being Ian) Productions Inc. for season 1, Studio B (Being Ian II) Productions Inc. for season 2, and Studio B (Being Ian III) Productions Inc. for season 3.)

Original release
- Network: YTV
- Release: January 1, 2005 – October 11, 2008

Being Ian is a Canadian animated television series that aired on YTV from January 1, 2005 to October 11, 2008 for a total of three seasons and 63 episodes. Created by and based on the early life of Ian James Corlett, the series focuses on 12-year-old Ian Kelley, who aspires to become a filmmaker. It was produced by Studio B Productions and distributed worldwide by Nelvana Enterprises, except Canada, the Netherlands, Spain, Portugal and Australia.

== Premise ==
The full one-hour series finale, "An Ianconvenient Truth".

12-year-old Ian Kelley from Burnaby, British Columbia aspires to become a filmmaker.

== Characters ==
=== Kelley family ===
- Ian James Kelley (voiced by Richard Ian Cox) is the main protagonist of the series. Ian Kelley aspires to become a filmmaker. Unfortunately, his family is mostly indifferent towards his creative streak, which is a constant source of frustration for him. Ian is intelligent, if somewhat naive, he has a very large imagination, and often gets lost in daydreams (many of which are parodies of famous films). His ultimate dream is to win an Academy Award, to the point that he constantly practices his acceptance speech, just so he will not be caught speechless if and when it ever does happen. Aside from this, Ian is a typical sitcom child; most plots involve him either failing at an elaborate scheme or trying desperately to survive in a world that does not seem to fit his ideals. Ian's middle name is a reference to Ian James Corlett (whom he is based on). He has a little crush on Sandi as seen in various animated thoughts, but in some episodes Grace (an Asian girl who has a crush on him as well).
- Kenneth "Ken" Kelley (voiced by Louis Chirillo) is Ian's father. He owns Kelley's Keyboards, a local music store. Ken, while a loving husband and father, is somewhat clueless, easily distracted, and chronically uncool. While he tries his best to keep his household in check, every member of his family knows exactly how to get their way with him. Ken is chronically dependent on his wife to keep his life in check; when she temporarily left him, it only took a few days for him to regress to a neanderthal. When he was younger, Ken dreamed of becoming a recording star and showing up to all of the "cool" kids who snubbed him. However, his recording career ended the same day it began, as the only song he played was "I's the B'y". While often used for comic relief, Ken can be a sympathetic character, especially when he seems aware of how uncool he is. Ken is a workaholic and has a very gung-ho attitude towards volunteer service, seemingly oblivious to the fact that his sons do not share his attitude. His catchphrase is "Holy moly, ravioli!".
- Victoria "Vicky" Kelley (née Menske) (voiced by Patricia Drake) is Ian's mother from Poland. She is a kind, loving, and good-hearted, but short-tempered and stubborn mother. She divides her time as a homemaker and helping Ken run the music store. While she loves her husband and sons very dearly, they all have a good reason to fear her wrath. While she usually is the most level-headed member of the family, Vicky can be surprisingly petty and selfish when she does not get her own way. She also constantly annoys her family with odd obsessions she develops (collector's spoons, organic food, deformed animals, etc.), to the point of being oblivious to anything else. Usually her husband and sons are at her wrath, while she is proud of their achievements and they care about each other.
- Kyle Kelley (voiced by Ty Olsson) is Ian's brother and the oldest child of the three. He isn't stupid so much as lazy; he knows how to get his way around the house, and sees no reason to put any real effort into anything. Unknown to most, he is actually very intelligent; he is able to spell highly difficult words with ease, can perform complex mathematical equations in his head, and can memorize entire science textbooks. The only thing that Kyle is really interested in is the opposite sex; he readily will take chase after any attractive female that catches his eye, but his pursuits seldom lead to anything other than rejection. As with Korey, Kyle has a playfully antagonistic relationship with the well-behaved Ian; while he probably cares for the "doofus" deep down, the temptations to play off of Ian's gullibility and sensitivity are too much for him to resist most of the time.
- Korey Kelley (voiced by Matt Hill) is Ian's other brother and the middle child of the three. Korey is a rather idiosyncratic individual because not even his own family understands him most of the time. Most of the time Korey seems lost in his own world. Despite this, Korey actually has a sharp mind and is often very observant – it seems he simply chooses not to be aware of his surroundings most of the time. Caught in the middle between his two brothers, as being the middle child Korey combines the niceness and sensitiveness of the youngest child and the laziness of the oldest to form his own personality. Although it's not shown as much, Korey (sometimes openly) shows affection and kindness for Ian and his other family members; however, this is overlooked quite a lot as he is often playing pranks with Kyle and is very lazy at times. A running gag is that Korey never removes his cap, even when he sleeps.
- Chopin (voiced by David Kaye) is the Kelley family dog, a lap dog of indeterminate breed who is missing one of his hind legs. Ian received him as a gift when he was young, and it has since come out that Vicky, who cares deeply for deformed animals, told him that all dogs have three legs at the time. Chopin's role is mostly limited to physical comedy – an often-used gag is the fact that Chopin is unable to stay upright when he lifts a leg to urinate.

=== Other characters ===
- Tyrone "Ty" Washington (voiced by Dexter Bell) is Ian's best friend and brother from the America. Considerably more together than Ian, Tyrone often attempts to act as the voice of reason, although he is usually willing to go along with whatever schemes his friend cooks up. Tyrone is usually the one to pull Ian back to reality when one of his fantasies goes too far. His father is a 6'8" African-American basketball player. His mother is a 4'3" Asian nurse.
- Sandra "Sandi" Crocker (voiced by Tabitha St. Germain) is Ian's other best friend. She is an athletic, short-tempered tomboy, and can physically dominate Ian and Tyrone easily. Together with Tyrone, Sandi often acts as a bemused sort of Greek chorus to Ian's antics. Her relationship with the boys is completely platonic, although she once accidentally admitted that she expects Ian and Tyrone's friendship to be strained by fighting for her affections when they become older. There is, however, a slight romance hinted between Ian and Sandi.
- Eleanor Kelley (voiced by Patricia Drake) is Ken's patriotic mother from Scotland. She speaks in a thick brogue and can terrorize her entire family with little effort – no member of her family is willing to cross her. A clever joke is made of this in the opening theme at one point; Ian fantasizes his family as movie monsters, but Grandma Kelley stays exactly the same.
- Mary Menske (voiced by Christina Jastrzembska) is Vicky's mother. Being a doting grandmother, she is constantly pampering her family with hearty meals and tacky handmade clothing. She never approved of Ken's marriage to Vicky; she rather sees it as a result of a Gypsy curse on her family. Even after Ken and Vicky had been married for two decades, she still held out on hope for Vicky to get back with her ex-boyfriend Lubomir Wormchuk. She only gave her blessing to the marriage when she discovered that Lubomir had lost his teeth (what had attracted her attention in the first place).
- Odbald (voiced by Ian James Corlett) is Ken's assistant at Kelley's Keyboards. A rural immigrant from the Netherlands, he moved to Canada to escape a life of "polishing cheeses and carving wooden shoes". Odbald, despite being an adult, is very immature – leaving him in charge of the Kelley boys always results in disaster. Odbald is an expert in keyboards of all kinds, to the point that he becomes emotionally attached to them. Odbald is utterly devoted to Ken – or "Mishter Kelley", as he calls him – and often goes out of his way to aid Ken in tasks far beyond his duties in Kelley's Keyboards. Whenever Ken accidentally damages something, his stock response is to say "Odbald, could you take care of that for me?" Odbald lives in the back room of Kelley's Keyboards and has a proclivity for nodding off at inappropriate times and eating messily.
- Bill McCammon (voiced by Richard Newman) is Ian's school principal at Celine Dion Middle School. He, along with Mr. Greeble, does not trust Ian (this sometimes is due to his imagination) and his family. Nevertheless, he does his best to set forward a proper education for the entire school.
- Mr. Greeble (voiced by Peter Kelamis and Ty Olsson in his first appearance) is one of Ian's teachers at Celine Dion Middle School. He, along with Mr. McCammon, does not trust Ian (this sometimes is due to his imagination).
- Ronald Fleeman (voiced by Ian James Corlett) is the owner of a smoothie shop next door to Kelley's Keyboards (and Spa).
- Grace Chou Lam (voiced by Shannon Chan-Kent) is an nerdy Asian girl who is Ian's friend, and she has a massive crush on him.

== Episodes ==
=== Series overview ===
Season	Episodes	Season premiere	Season finale
1	26	January 1, 2005	October 18, 2005
2	26	November 29, 2005	May 23, 2006
3	11	October 17, 2007	October 11, 2008

=== Season 1 (2005) ===
Season 1 episodes are directed by Andy Bartlett and Josh Mepham.

No. overall	No. in season	Title	Written by	Storyboard by	Original release date
1	1	"The Kelley Boys and the Mysterious Lighthouse Mystery"	Dennis Heaton	Rob Boutilier	January 1, 2005
After being pranked by his two idiot brothers, Ian sends them on a wild goose chase with a made-up treasure map.
2	2	"Cyrano de Mille"	Steve Sullivan	Gerry Fournier and Jason Horychun	May 3, 2005
Ian is disappointed that he cannot see the horror movie, Hemorrhage II, so he decides to create his own horror movie—uh, romance movie—with help from his friends Ty and Sandi. Kyle offers to take him to see the movie on the condition that he uses his film knowledge to impress his girlfriend.
3	3	"Piano Man"	Edward Kay	Marlon Deane and Brad Neave	May 10, 2005
It's Ken and Vicky's wedding anniversary, and Ian doesn't have enough money to buy his parents a gift. Ian secretly rebuilds a piano for pianist Royal Stilton in exchange for two tickets to one of his concerts.
4	4	"Truth in Advertising"	Jeff Biederman	Joel Dickie and James Wootton	May 17, 2005
Odbald has left for his family reunion, leaving Ken to have his sons work at the keyboard store in his place. To Ian's dismay, he gets the weekend shift when hardly anyone comes to visit. Ian strikes a deal with his father to escape his shift by creating a commercial to attract more customers.
5	5	"Miss Tweenage Burnaby"	Steve Sullivan	Dennis Crawford and Tim Packford	May 24, 2005
After seeing Sandi grow jealous of Tiffany during a school assembly, Ian persuades Sandi to enter the talent competition to outshine her.
6	6	"The Greatest Story Never Told"	Dennis Heaton	Rob Boutilier and Jim Miller	May 31, 2005
While doing a school assignment on his family tree Ian is unable to find his baby photos and comes to the conclusion he is adopted. Ian plans to leave his home in search of his true family.
7	7	"Little Camp of Horrors"	Dennis Heaton	Gerry Fournier, Jason Horychun and Dan Hughes	June 7, 2005
After convincing his parents to let him go, Ian heads to Werner Wolfenstein's film camp to learn more about filmmaking, only to discover it doesn't teach filming at all. Meanwhile, the Kelley family goes on a camping trip for vacation, only for various problems to arise.
8	8	"Cool Status Quo"	Jeff Biederman	Russ Crispin and Brad Neave	June 14, 2005
After a series of incidents, Ian along with a group of nerds known as the Gifted Kids become popular earning the jealousy of his older brother Kyle. Kyle attempts to humiliate the Gifted Kids, but all his efforts only make them more popular. At first, Ian enjoys the attention he receives, but when he learns that he and the Gifted Kids will be sent to a school for smart students, he realizes that he will have to leave Ty and Sandi behind. Ian needs to work together with Kyle to stop this from happening.
9	9	"The Kelleys"	Jeff Biederman	Joel Dickie and James Wootton	June 21, 2005
During a family movie night at the Kelley household, Ian accidentally destroys his family's home movies, upsetting his mother. Ian secretly films his family on video cameras to create The Kelleys, a reality show starring his family to make amends.
10	10	"Catch Me If You Cane"	Steve Sullivan	Dennis Crawford and Tim Packford	June 28, 2005
Ian forgot to submit his history report by the due date. He bought himself some time by claiming that his report is a movie about the Old West. Unfortunately, Ian cannot work on his film because his father is forcing him to work at the retirement center. While working there, Ian meets Lorence Lipsits, an elderly man who offers to help him create his movie in exchange for being released from the retirement center.
11	11	"Joust Kidding Around"	Steve Sullivan	Rob Boutilier and Dan Hughes	July 5, 2005
Ian wants to make a medieval movie and plans to use the civic festival of the annual Burnaby street fair for his production.
12	12	"The Boy Who Cried UFO"	Dennis Heaton	Todd DeMong and Jason Horychun	July 12, 2005
Ian and his friends are punished by their teacher for making fun of an old public safety film, and they are challenged to create a superior safety film. Their film is a success, but when Ian shows it to his family, they believe it is a real alien message foretelling an alien invasion.
13	13	"Once a Pawn a Time"	Dennis Heaton	Brad Neave and Kent Webb	July 19, 2005
Ian needs to complete some extracurricular credits to enter film school. He tries several different clubs, but none of them work out. Following Grace's suggestion, Ian decides to join the chess club.
14	14	"Is There an Ian in the House?"	Dennis Heaton	Marlon Deane, Dennis Crawford and James Wootten	July 26, 2005
While playing floor hockey at the community center, Ian trips and injures himself. Although he insists he is unharmed, Ian is sent to the hospital and must find a way to escape while avoiding a nurse who is determined to keep him there.
15	15	"For Whom the Wedding Bell Tolls"	Ben Joseph, Franklin Young & Annika Hagen	Sherwin Macario, Tim Packford and Todd Demong	August 2, 2005
The Kelleys are asked to host a traditional Indian wedding ceremony for some old friends, but they must deal with Mata-Ji, the groom's strict mother, who insists everything must be perfect. Ian takes creative license to videotape the wedding ceremony.
16	16	"Links for Love"	Annika Hagen & Paul Greenberg	Rob Boutilier and Dan Hughes	August 9, 2005
Uncle Ian Kelly, a world-famous golfer known as the Golfinator, is coming to visit Burnaby for one of his tours. Everyone is excited for Uncle Ian's visit except for his brother Ken, who is jealous of his younger brother's success. However, after being thrown off his game by noticing a couple spending time together, Ian discovers that his uncle is lonely and decides to help him find a date. Meanwhile, Ken buys the Scudgebuster, a high-pressure water sprayer designed to help with cleaning the gutters, but he becomes obsessed with the power it provides and is fixated on making everything clean.
17	17	"Show Me the Bunny"	Jennifer Whalen	Chez Batista and Jason Horychun	August 16, 2005
Ian forgets to take out the recycling bin and switches it with his neighbour's empty one. However, the neighbour exposes Ian's lie in front of his family. Angry at being deceived, Vicky forces Ian to care for Mr. Lipsit's pet bunny, Mr. Fuzzy, as punishment to teach him responsibility. Ian is reluctant to do this because he has a fear of small animals stemming from an incident when he was younger. However, Ian soon warms up to Mr. Fuzzy when he discovers that Mr. Fuzzy is the perfect role for his monster movie project.
18	18	"Ian's Louse-ey Day"	Steve Sullivan	Tom Nesbitt and Kent Webb	August 23, 2005
Tiffany invites everyone at school to her costume party, where they must dress up as their favourite childhood toy. Ian tries to avoid going to the party by claiming he lost his invitation, but his mother finds the letter and has already made him a costume. When Korey returns home from the ice rink with head lice from wearing a kids' helmet, Ian sees it as the perfect excuse to skip Tiffany's embarrassing party. However, all his attempts to catch head lice fail, and instead his entire family ends up with it, forcing them to deal with Grandma Kelly's old-fashioned home remedies.
19	19	"Sask-Watch"	Steve Sullivan	Dennis Crawford and Jorden Oliwa	August 30, 2005
The Kelley family are headed to a snowy mountain for some fun, though each of them have their own plans. Ken and Vicky head to a sweet chalet for a romantic getaway, only for Vicky to become distracted by a spoon collector convention. Kyle attempts to show off his snowboarding skills to impress girls, and Ian and Korey decide to hunt down the elusive Sasquatch.
20	20	"The Curse"	Victor Nicolle	Sherwin Macario and Tim Packford	September 6, 2005
Ian and his brothers are forced to work overnight at the keyboard store by their parents as punishment for watching a scary movie. The boys skip their work, leading to an argument between Ken and Odbald. Odbald storms out in anger, leaving behind a threatening message. When strange occurrences begin the following night, Ian suspects Odbald has placed a Dutch curse on the store.
21	21	"Snow Fun"	Dennis Heaton	Tom Nesbitt and Kent Webb	September 13, 2005
Ian is sad that it hasn't snowed in Burnaby for four years. His friends try to cheer him up by building a snowman in the school field, but Principal McCammon catches them in the act and punishes all three by making them clean the school's dirty laundry. When a snowstorm hits the town, Ian and his friends are left behind and trapped in the school. At first, they start to have fun, but soon their enjoyment turns dangerous as Ian begins to go crazy from cabin fever. Meanwhile, Ken, Kyle, and Korey must deliver an organ during the snowstorm to Mr. Eric, who threatens to curse them if they don't.
22	22	"Bad Day at White Rock"	Steve Sullivan	Chez Battista and Jason Horychun	September 20, 2005
The Kelleys are heading to their annual White Rock Beach trip. Ian isn't looking forward to it because the same things happen each year: Kyle chases after girls, Korey wreaks havoc, and his parents treat him like a baby. This year, however, Ian has a plan to change all that. As he begins to implement his plan, Ian suddenly finds himself stranded on a deserted island.
23	23	"Crime-Corder"	Jeff Biederman	Tom Nesbitt and Kent Webb	September 27, 2005
After capturing footage of a thief in action, Ian becomes a video detective, recording crimes as they occur on camera. A rift begins to form between Ian and Tyrone when Ian refuses to consider Tyrone's ideas. The situation worsens when a beautiful girl asks for their help, leading to a rivalry between the two friends as they compete for her affection.
24	24	"Band 'o' Bruthaz"	Dennis Heaton	Chez Battista and Werner Marcus	October 4, 2005
A talent show occurs at the Royal Oaks Retirement Home. Kyle and Korey struggle to entertain the seniors with their music, but Ian is able to assist them by playing a popular soundtrack on CD. Their success leads the three siblings to form the group Band 'o' Bruthaz, a boy band that gains popularity through dancing and lip-syncing to music. Note: The Canadian rock band Gob guest stars in this episode. Their song "Ming Tran" (from their Foot in Mouth Disease album) is also heard in the episode.
25	25	"Hockey Night in Burnaby"	Jeff Biederman	Todd Demong, Dennis Crawford and Dan Hughes	October 11, 2005
Ian meets Ryan Walter, a retired hockey player and motivational speaker at the Royal Oaks Retirement Home. When Ryan mentions that the league plans to sell the GM Place Organ, Ian decides to buy it in hopes of meeting his favourite hockey team, the Vancouver Canucks.
26	26	"Planet of the Imps"	Brad Birch & Annika Hagen	Dennis Crawford, Todd Demong and Jorden Oliwa	October 18, 2005
Ian wants to buy a new software program for his computer and asks his parents for it. They refuse to buy it for him because of its high price, insisting he find a job. At Sandi's suggestion, Ian decides to enter the babysitting business under the guise of opening a daycare. Although Ian is eager to work with twelve children, he soon becomes overwhelmed and realizes he has bitten off more than he can chew. Not helping matters are his two idiot brothers, who are intent on sabotaging him.

=== Season 2 (2005–06) ===
Episodes in season 2 are directed by Josh Mepham.

No. overall	No. in season	Title	Written by	Storyboard by	Original release date
27	1	"SCREAM Because I Know What You Did to That Psycho Last Summer!"	Vito Viscomi	Kent Webb, Tim Packford and Brad Neave	November 29, 2005
A family trip to a theme park unexpectedly becomes dangerous as members of the Kelley family begin to vanish.
28	2	"Animal House"	Steve Sullivan	Jay Horychun and Dan Hughes	December 6, 2005
Ian Kelley makes an animal shelter video for class for his nature friendly substitute teacher. However, things get out of hand when people start bringing odd animals for him to take care of, which is too much for the Kelley house to handle. Meanwhile, Kyle is made to work as a janitor in the town's ferry boat.
29	3	"What's Comb Over You?"	Vito Viscomi	Dennis Crawford, Jesse Schilperoort, and Tim Stuby	December 13, 2005
Ian becomes depressed after learning his father is bald and carries several bad genes from his family. Ian believes he will inherit all these negative genes and begins to act like an old man in response, while his father behaves like a young teenager after realizing he is middle-aged.
30	4	"O Brother, Where Art Thou?"	Dennis Heaton	Jos Humphrey, Eduardo Soriano, and Tim Packford	December 20, 2005
Sick and tired of being pranked by Korey, Ian, with Kyle's help, retaliates with his own series of pranks. Ian soon begins to regret his actions when he discovers Korey's belongings are missing and believes he caused his brother to run away from home.
31	5	"Morning Zoo"	Dennis Heaton	Jos Humphrey and Eddie Soriano	December 27, 2005
After listening to Mr. Greeble's dull morning announcements, Ian persuades Principal McCammon to let him host the announcements to make them more fun and engaging. After a rough start, Ian's announcements become a big hit with help from Dennis. However, his newfound popularity leads him to mistreat Dennis, and he soon turns the tables on Ian by taking over the show himself. The hostility between the two boys threatens to force the show off the air.
32	6	"Kelley vs. Kelley"	Dennis Heaton	Andy Bartlett, Tyler Schroeder and Don Boone	January 3, 2006
While filming a movie, Ian accidentally hits his mother's crystal ballerina statue, breaking one of its arms, and hastily repairs it. Ian tries to keep quiet about it, but his nerves get the better of him, and he decides to tell the truth. As Ian explains what happened, his father runs in and breaks the statue, causing a fight to break out between him and his wife. Vicky leaves the house to stay with Grandma Menske. Without their mother around to keep order, the Kelley household falls into chaos, with Kyle and Korey barely leaving the couch, and Ken regressing into a neanderthal. Ian realizes he has to set things right and plans to get his parents back together again.
33	7	"Ian the Pecky-Head"	Steve Sullivan	Tim Packford and Kent Webb	January 10, 2006
During a school basketball game, Ian becomes the school's mascot, Pecky the Pelican, after Grace quits in frustration. Ian tries to show support for his team by displaying school spirit, but he is seen as annoying and is treated poorly by the basketball team. However, Ian soon meets other school mascots who have also been mistreated by their own teams, and they decide to stand up against it. Meanwhile, Ian's family enters B.A.R.F. - the Burnaby Annual Really Fun parade - with their own float, determined to win and take down Mr. Fleeman.
34	8	"Being Principal Bill"	Vito Viscomi	Dan Hughes, Tyler Schroeder, Dennis Crawford and Brad Neave	January 17, 2006
Ian's wild imagination is getting him into trouble at school. Back at home, Ian discovers that his house is falling apart, so he contacts the show Renovate This to help fix it. While checking his room, Ian finds a hole he has never seen before that leads directly to a tunnel to his principal's mind.
35	9	"Million Dollar $andi"	Vito Viscomi	Nelson Garcia and Don Boone	January 24, 2006
The school needs a new representative for the boxing team after Dennis lost the latest match, and Principal McCammon tasks Ian and Ty with finding a replacement. After several tryouts, Ian notices Sandi is perfect for the role, but Principal McCammon refuses to let her participate because the boxing team is only for boys. Ian manages to get around this by disguising Sandi as a boy with black hair dye.
36	10	"Health Nut"	Steve Sullivan	Dennis Crawford and Tim Stuby	January 31, 2006
The Kelley boys are going to the hospital for their annual check-up. Ian's brothers tamper with his urine sample by pouring lemon-lime soda into it, causing Ian to believe he is genuinely sick. Ian tries to be healthier but soon causes trouble by pushing his healthy ideas onto everyone else. Grandma Kelly disciplines Kyle and Kory after they caused chaos at the hospital, only to find that their antics are too much for her to handle.
37	11	"Behind Bars"	Dennis Heaton	Dan Hughes and Tyler Schroeder	February 7, 2006
Mr. Greeble hosts a school contest to buy a statue to honor his great-great-uncle Gus Greeble. Whoever sells the most chocolate bars will win a BMX bike. Everyone mocks Ian as he always loses in contests and ends up in last place. Ian has an idea to win the contest by creating a fake TV commercial that uses subliminal advertising to hypnotize viewers into buying his chocolate bars. The plan works and everyone wants to buy the chocolate bars, but soon trouble occurs when the hypnotism wears off and everyone complains to Ian over false advertising.
38	12	"Out of Focus Group"	Steve Sullivan	Tim Packford and Kent Webb	February 14, 2006
Ian gets a D on his science project for failing to demonstrate behavioral modification. After seeing Grace receive an A-plus for showcasing her pet hamsters operating a computer, Ian asks her for help in using her behavioral modification formula to convince his classmates to like his movies.
39	13	"Ken Kelley and the Keyboard Factory"	Vito Viscomi	Don Boone, Nelson Garcia and Craig Wilson	February 21, 2006
Odbald's cousins, Umpy and Lumpy, have arrived from the Netherlands to visit their cousin. Odbald is initially happy to see them, but he becomes jealous when they manage to run the keyboard store better than he does. Ken gets hit in the head by the chair of a grand piano that he and Odbald were lifting to a customer's house, and he's sent to the hospital to recover. Realizing the close call he had, Ian's father decides to hold a contest to determine who will inherit Kelley's Keyboards should anything happen to him, and Ian ultimately gets the role, much to his disappointment, as it puts his career path of becoming a movie director on hold.
40	14	"Kelley's Seven"	Vito Viscomi	Dennis Crawford and Tim Stuby	February 28, 2006
While doing online shopping, Ian finds a half-eaten, moldy cheese sandwich that was eaten by Werner Wolfenstein. Ian gets the sandwich from his parents after begging them for it, on the condition that he keeps it at home. Ian can't help himself and brings the sandwich to school to show off. Later, as he and his brothers help clean the keyboard store, Ian hides the sandwich in a piano bench, which is taken by Mr. Fleeman. Unable to convince him to give the piano bench back, Ian turns to his friends for help to sneak into Fleeman's store and take back the piano bench to recover the moldy cheese sandwich.
41	15	"The Good Egg"	Dennis Heaton	Jos Humphrey and Jay Surridge	March 7, 2006
Ian and Sandi are partnered to work on a class assignment about how to raise an egg like a child. As he looks after the egg, Ian becomes attached to it, naming it Eggbert. However, Ian conflicts with his partner Sandi when she asks to look after Eggbert, but only she can use him as an excuse to skip gym class. An argument erupts between them, and during the fight, Eggbert is tossed aside and goes missing. Meanwhile, Korey tries to find a job so he can earn money to buy a CD.
42	16	"5 o'clock Snooze"	Dennis Heaton	Tim Packford and Kent Webb	March 14, 2006
While their parents have a night out, Ian and his brothers are left home alone and start causing trouble. Ian records footage of his brothers' actions. The aftermath leaves the house destroyed and the sons grounded. However, Ian meets Tony Parsons, who is impressed with Ian's video footage and offers him a job as a news reporter for TVBC News. Ian is excited about the role, but he soon becomes bored because there isn't much exciting to report around Burnaby. Ian soon gets a story after Kyle complains that their dad is making them work at the keyboard store for free. Ian uses this information to publish a story, but it causes problems for his father Ken, as he finds himself trapped in the keyboard store surrounded by an angry mob.
43	17	"Home Alone"	Steve Sullivan	Dan Hughes and Tyler Schroeder	March 21, 2006
Ken and Vicky are leaving to celebrate their wedding anniversary, and they'll be gone for the entire weekend. Ian plans to get rid of his brothers so he can have the house to himself to watch the Happy Unicorns movie marathon.
44	18	"Dorkbusters"	Steve Sullivan	Don Boone and Jordan Oliwa	March 28, 2006
As he tries to film his monster movie Murder by Mop, Ian accidentally destroys his camera. Unable to repair it, Ian gets an idea after he unwittingly saves Tyrone from being humiliated and is paid by him as a reward. Later, after helping Grace out of a jam and seeing other nerds turn to him for help, Ian forms the group Dorkbusters while recruiting Dennis and Korey to join him. Dorkbusters is a group dedicated to performing public humiliations on themselves to save other dorks from being embarrassed. However, Ian's newfound income comes at a personal cost, as he is seen as the biggest dork on campus, with his friends too embarrassed to be seen with him. Ian aims to fix his reputation at the upcoming school dance. After getting stuck with 217 accordions due to a polka fad, Ken and Vicky hire Vlad Kowalcik, a Polish hockey star to work at Kelley Keyboards to attract Polish customers to the store and buy all their accordions. However, his actions have the opposite effect, driving away all their customers.
45	19	"Spells Like Teen Spirit"	Dennis Heaton	Dennis Crawford and Tim Stuby	April 4, 2006
The school's spelling team notices Kyle is naturally talented at spelling and wants him to join. Kyle refuses, fearing it would ruin his reputation at school if someone found out. After some pleading by Ian, Kyle agrees to join on the condition that he wears a disguise. Now disguised as the Phantom Speller, Kyle helps his team achieve many victories. Ian begins to grow jealous of Kyle's newfound fame. However, somehow Kyle's secret identity is exposed to the entire school, ruining his reputation, and he suspects Ian of being the one who revealed it. Despite Ian claiming innocence, Kyle doesn't believe him. Ian must figure out who ratted out Kyle and why.
46	20	"Dummy Up"	Steve Sullivan	Jos Humphrey, Nicola Humphrey and Werner Marcus	April 11, 2006
Ian is sick and tired of being picked on by Kyle and wishes to find a way to get even. When an old man offers a ventriloquist dummy named Slappy in place of a cash payment for having his instrument fixed at his father's keyboard store, Ian uses the dummy to get back at Kyle with jokes and insults. Ian's ventriloquism becomes a hit at school, and he realises he can get away with insulting others by having Slappy say it. However, the wisecracks and jokes become more spiteful when Ian can't stop himself from insulting others and hurting their feelings and he fears he is turning into Slappy himself. Kory and Dennis become friends after they share the cost of an Armadilloman action figure and bond over their knowledge of the comic series. However, their close friendship ends when neither of them can agree on who owns the figure.
47	21	"The Great Escape"	Vito Viscomi	Tim Packford and Kent Webb	April 18, 2006
The day has arrived for the release of the highly anticipated video game "Blood Blitz 3000 II", and Ian has a golden ticket to buy it. He can't wait for school to end so he can head over to the game store to get his copy. Mr. Greeble takes a break from teaching because he's constantly pranked by his students, and the very strict Mr. Mann replaces him. After Mr. Mann gives everyone detention for being pranked on, Ian tries every excuse he can think of to leave class, but Mr. Mann thwarts every attempt. Will Ian find a way to escape and buy his game in time?
48	22	"Ian Kelley's Day Off"	Vito Viscomi	Dan Hughes and Tyler Schroeder	April 25, 2006
Ian wants to attend the premiere of Werner Wolfenstein's newest movie, "Attack of the Giant Garden Slugs," where actor Del Bowmont will be there in person to sign autographs. His mother refuses to let him go because it is on a school day, much to Ian's dismay. While walking to school, Ian runs into his old friends from film camp, and together they come up with a plan to skip school and go to the movie.
49	23	"The Fifth and a Half Sense"	Dennis Heaton	Don Boone, Dennis Crawford, Jordan Oliwa and Tim Stuby	May 2, 2006
Ian accidentally hits his nose while trying to open the door of his stuck locker. His nose becomes large and blocked, and Ian discovers he can predict events through scent. Now with the ability to smell the future, Ian starts using his powers to help others in need. At first, Ian is pleased that he's helping everyone, but then people begin taking advantage of his powers, and he soon realizes it's his nose that becomes famous, not him.
50	24	"Doofus"	Steve Sullivan	Dennis Crawford and Tim Stuby	May 9, 2006
After seeing Korey cheered on by the crowd during a curling match, Ian manages to convince a television network to air a show starring his brother called Doofus. The show features Korey performing wild and risky stunts. It quickly becomes a hit, with everyone loving it. However, their mother, Vicky is upset and tries to get the show cancelled.
51	25	"Hurry for Hollywood Part 1"	Vito Viscomi	Dennis Crawford, Tim Packford and Kent Webb	May 16, 2006
The Kelley family is headed to Hollywood in Los Angeles, California, for a vacation. Ian hopes to enter his movie masterpiece in the "Project: Filmmaker" contest led by Werner Wolfenstein and become the next big movie director. However, with his father having several sights to see along the way, Ian thinks they will never make it to Los Angeles on time, and he secretly decides to sabotage his father's vacation plans. Meanwhile, with their family away, Grandma Kelley and Grandma Menske have plans for the keyboard store.
52	26	"Hurry for Hollywood Part 2"	Vito Viscomi; Story by: Blair Peters	Jos Humphrey, Werner Marcus and Tyler Schroeder	May 23, 2006
Ian believes he can no longer enter the "Project: Filmmaker" contest after his movie is destroyed until his parents suggest he create a new movie using the footage he recorded during the trip. With an idea in mind, Ian edits all the footage together to create a film, but he still needs to reach the contest deadline to submit his film on time.

=== Season 3 (2007–08) ===
Season 3 episodes are directed by Chad Van De Keere.

No. overall	No. in season	Title	Storyboard by	Original release date
53	1	"One Week Later"	Dennis Crawford and Samuel To	October 17, 2007
After winning the "Project: Filmmaker" award in Hollywood, Ian returns to Burnaby to discover that fame is fleeting. Disillusioned, he decides to start his own website where people can watch his original films. Problem is, no one's visiting his site. Meanwhile, Ken wants to tear down the seniors' spa and replace it with his keyboard store – until he discovers how lucrative a spa can be.
54	2	"Midnight Madness"	Colin Jack and Steve LeCouilliard	October 24, 2007
Ian's excited because the night has finally arrived – a special midnight screening of Werner Wolfenstein's cult horror classic "Curse of the Wererat." But the only person that will take him to the late night show is Grandma Kelley. And while a comedy of errors threatens to keep Ian from getting to the theatre in time, Odbald and a few of his foreign friends try to reenact a famous Dutch historical battle.
55	3	"Blah Blah Blog"	James Clow and Marv Newland	November 1, 2007
Ian thinks his website needs to be more exciting, so he decides to add a personal blog. Unfortunately, he does not know how to set one up, so he enlists tech guru Grace to help him. Soon, Grace is writing the blog for the lazy Ian. And when he unwittingly embarrasses Grace, she decides to give Ian a taste of his own medicine. Meanwhile, Ken tries to raise money for his store by holding the first annual Kelley's Spa and Keyboards Jog-a-thon.
56	4	"School Unfair"	Jason Horychun and Kent Webb	May 8, 2008
Ian loves the rides at the Annual School Fair. Too bad the rides do not love him – he's always getting motion sickness. So this year, Ian decides to lick his problem and cure his queasy stomach so he can go on all the rides he wants. But when the School Fair is sabotaged, all the clues point directly to Ian. Even though he swears he is innocent, Ian is banned from attending the fair. Ian must find out who's framing him so he can clear his name and go to the Fair.
57	5	"Adventures In Kelley Sitting"	Colin Jack and Steve LeCouilliard	May 15, 2008
Ian needs to get his parents out of the house so he can complete his rather elaborate (and house-destroying) science project. His parents finally leave when Ian gets Reality TV's "Fanny the Supersitter" to oversee the Kelley boys. Unfortunately, his grand scheme backfires, and completing his science project becomes the least of his problems. While Ian is battling his new sitter, Ken and Vicky become walking zombies when they decide to keep the Spa and Keyboard Store open 24 hours a day.
58	6	"The Ians"	Rodrigo Amador and Leah Waldron	May 22, 2008
Even though he is an award-winning director, Ian feels he is being treated like dirt – he has a list of chores to do, and his brothers are constantly pulling pranks on him. When the head of the "GOLD MOVIE AWARDS" visits the set Ian's working on, everybody pulls out the stops for the movie bigwig. Seeing this, Ian decides to hold his own movie awards and finally get the respect he deserves. But Ian bites off more than he can chew, and almost ends up losing all his friends.
59	7	"Winning Isn't Ian's Thing"	Jason Horychun and Kent Webb	May 29, 2008
Celine Dion High is once again holding its annual Kooky Sports Day, where all the students compete in wacky events. While Korey, Kyle – and even Ken in his younger days – were Kooky Sports Day champs, Ian has never once won an award. But this year, Ian has a plan to change all that. Meanwhile, Vicky will do whatever it takes to make sure she wins the Store of the Year award and put the cocky Mr. Fleeman in his place.
60	8	"Everykid 13"	Steve LeCouilliard and Mike West	June 5, 2008
Ian posts Sandi's personal video confessionals on his website. But through a technical mix-up, the video is of his dog Chopin with Sandi's voice over it. And while Sandi is embarrassed and angry at Ian, the webisodes become extremely popular. Ian has to decide what is more important – his friendship with Sandi, or a hit website. And because of a mix-up at Kelley's Spa, old people are convinced the sauna is a Fountain of Youth.
61	9	"That's Ridonkulous"	Rodrigo Amador and James Clow	June 12, 2008
When the local skatepark is threatened to be demolished, Ian decides he, Sandi, and Tyrone can quickly make money and save it. The three of them start a company that produces TV commercials. The ads are a huge success, making actor Tyrone a huge star. But Tyrone's success causes a giant rift in his friendship with Ian. And when Ken calls skateboarders a menace to society, Kyle and Korey bet they can turn him into a hardcore skate punk.
62	10	"Ian Kelley Is History"	Jason Horychun and Kent Webb	October 4, 2008
Ian has to write a paper on what he considers the most important moment in history. But while working on a movie set, Ian unknowingly consumes copious amounts of caffeine, making him a wide-eyed mess. During his battle with insomnia, Ian begins to stress over writing his history paper and he begins to hallucinate that he actually IS the historical figures he is thinking about. When he finally snaps out of his insomnia, he finds he is too exhausted to write his assignment in time to make the deadline.
63	11	"An Ianconvenient Truth"	Andy Bartlett, Lyndon Ruddy, Drew Edwards, Mike West and Craig Wilson	October 11, 2008
After learning about a Being Green contest, Ian is determined to win and make his dreams of fame and fortune come true. The only problem is that he still needs to come up with an award-worthy idea. Meanwhile, his mother Vicky plans to win the contest by neutralizing Kelley's family carbon footprint so she can meet David Suzuki, her eco-idol. To win the contest, Ian will have to out-green kids across the country and even his own mother! Note: This episode airs as either 2 half-hour specials or a single hour-long special. The hour-long version contains an additional minute of animation not included in the 2-part version.

== Production ==
Being Ian was produced by Studio B Productions in association with YTV and was based on the Being Ian book series by Ian James Corlett. The television adaptation was developed by Corlett, who also served as one of the series' writers. Production emphasized character-driven comedy and imaginative fantasy sequences that reflected Ian's active imagination, with episodes frequently shifting between everyday family life and elaborate fictional scenarios.

The series was animated using digital production techniques and featured a distinctive visual style that blended exaggerated character animation with cinematic parody. Many episodes paid homage to popular films, television programs, and genres, with Ian's fantasies often recreating the conventions of action, science fiction, horror, and adventure stories.

Voice recording was carried out in Vancouver, British Columbia, where the series' principal cast was based. Several performers voiced multiple supporting and incidental characters throughout the show's run. Music for the series was composed by Brian Carson, while the opening theme, "Gotta Be Me", was performed by the Canadian band Triple Threat.

== Broadcast ==
Being Ian premiered on YTV in Canada on January 1, 2005, as part of the network's Overdrive programming event before beginning its regular run on April 26, 2005. The series concluded on October 11, 2008. Reruns later aired on YTV, as well as on Nickelodeon Canada from September 5, 2011, to August 30, 2013, and on BBC Kids until the channel ceased operations in 2018.

In the United States, the series premiered on Qubo on September 19, 2009. It later aired as part of Qubo's overnight Night Owl programming block until the network ceased operations in 2021.

Internationally, Being Ian was broadcast in several territories, including Australia on ABC, the United Kingdom on CBBC, India on Disney Channel, Latin America mainly on Cartoon Network (Latin America) and DIscovery Kids (Latin America) (Brazil feed only aired on Cartoon Network) and the Arab world on MBC3. Through distribution by Nelvana Enterprises, the series was also licensed to broadcasters in France, Germany, Spain, Portugal, several African territories (such as K-T.V.), Singapore, Indonesia, Switzerland, Morocco, Panama, and Colombia.

In the Arab World, the series aired on MBC3 in 2006.

== Awards and nominations ==
Year	Association	Category	Result	Recipient(s)	Nominee(s) / episode	Ref.
2005	Leo Awards	Best Animation Program or Series	Won	Blair Peters, Chris Bartleman, Kathy Antonsen-Rocchio (Producers)		
2005	Leo Awards	Best Direction in an Animation Program or Series	Won	Andy Bartlett	"Links for Love"	
2005	Leo Awards	Best Screenwriting in an Animation Program or Series	Won	Dennis Heaton	"The Greatest Story Never Told"	
2005	Leo Awards	Best Overall Sound in an Animation Program or Series	Nominated	Marcel Duperreault, Todd Araki, Jason Fredrickson, Kirk Furniss	"The Greatest Story Never Told"	
2006	Leo Awards	Best Animation Program or Series	Won	Kathy Antonsen-Rocchio, Blair Peters, Chris Bartleman (Producers)		
2006	Leo Awards	Best Direction in an Animation Program or Series	Nominated	Josh Mepham	"Being Principal"	
2006	Leo Awards	Best Musical Score in an Animation Program or Series	Nominated	Hoot Gibson, Hal Foxton Beckett	"Being Principal"	
2007	Leo Awards	Best Direction in an Animation Program or Series	Won	Josh Mepham	"Hurry for Hollywood Special"	
2007	Leo Awards	Best Musical Score in an Animation Program or Series	Won	Hoot Gibson, Hal Foxton Beckett	"Hurry for Hollywood Special"	
2007	Leo Awards	Best Overall Sound in an Animation Program or Series	Nominated	Marcel Duperrault, Todd Araki, Jason Fredrickson, Kirk Furniss	"Hurry for Hollywood Special"	
2008	Leo Awards	Best Animation Program or Series	Nominated	Blair Peters, Chris Bartleman (Producers)		
2008	Leo Awards	Best Direction in an Animation Program or Series	Nominated	Chad Van De Keere	"Every Kid 13"	
