= Mixed Nutz =

- Genre: Children's television series
- Country of origin: Canada
- Original language: English
- No. of seasons: 1
- No. of episodes: 13

Production
- Production company: Big Bad Boo

Original release
- Release: 2008

Mixed Nutz is a Canadian animated cartoon series produced by Big Bad Boo Studios (formerly Norooz Productions). The show is about a group of friends from different backgrounds in a fictional town called Dyvercity. The main characters are Babak from Iran, Sanjay from India, Adele from Austria, Damaris from Cuba and Jae from Korea. The show has been referred to as "International" Peanuts for the simplicity of the animation style and its multicultural angle.

Big Bad Boo Studios produced 13 half-hour episodes in 2008 with an international cast and crew including Maz Jobrani and producers Aly Jetha and Shabnam Rezaei. The two also produced Babak and Friends- A First Norooz. Mixed Nutz aired on certain PBS and MHz Worldview stations in the United States as well as Shaw TV in Canada.

Mixed Nutz participated in several international film festivals, including the 2008 New York Television Festival and Chashama Film Festival.
