= Big Bad Boo =

Canadian animation studio

Big Bad Boo is a Canadian animation studio that specializes in animated series for television as well as games, apps, websites and curriculum development. Popular TV series are 16 Hudson, based on the miniseries Lili & Lola and musical series ABC with Kenny G, which is also spinoff.

Other titles include The Bravest Knight, a Hulu Original, and Mixed Nutz which aired on PBS in the US and in 30 other countries worldwide. Big Bad Boo's second TV series 1001 Nights is based on the One Thousand and One Nights book. In 2011, Big Bad Boo won the number one spot at Mipcom Junior in the top 30 most viewed children's shows. In 2012, Big Bad Boo won the BC Export Award in the Digital Media & Entertainment category. The BC Export Awards honor the top exporters in British Columbia.

== History ==
It was founded as Norooz Productions in New York and Los Angeles, and adopted its current name two years later in 2007 when it opened a Vancouver office. Big Bad Boo was co-founded by entrepreneurs Shabnam Rezaei and Aly Jetha with the initial direct-to-DVD movie Babak and Friends - A First Norooz, a Norooz holiday-special starring Shohreh Aghdashloo and Catherine Bell.

== Filmography ==
- Babak and Friends (2006–2007)
- Mixed Nutz (2008–2009)
- 1001 Nights (2010–2013)
- Lili & Lola (Mini Series) (2014–2017)
- 16 Hudson (2018–present) (Airing on Discovery Kids Arabic)
- The Bravest Knight (2019–present)
- ABC with Kenny G (2021–2022)
- Galapagos X (2023-present)
- Astra's World (TBA)
- Gone Bananas (TBA)
