= ABC with Kenny G =

Canadian animated series

ABC with Kenny G is a Canadian animated series developed and produced at Big Bad Boo Studios in Vancouver. The musical ABC series is a spin-off from 16 Hudson. The series is about Kensington, Lili's cat from 16 Hudson, who dresses up as a singer and goes down to the Milk & Cookies Jazz club at night, when the humans are sleeping, to teach his animal friends the ABCs. Marcus Mosley is the main performer in the role of Kensington. He is a gospel singer based in Vancouver.

ABC with Kenny G is created and directed by Shabnam Rezaei and airs on TVOKids, Ici Radio-Canada Télé, Knowledge Kids and TFO.
