= The Bravest Knight =

Canadian animated television series

- Genre: Magical; Adventure; Fantasy
- Created by: Daniel Errico
- Written by: Daniel Errico
- Directed by: Shabnam Rezaei
- Creative director: Shabnam Rezaei
- Voices of: T. R. Knight; Chance Hurstfield; Bobby Moynihan; Storm Reid; Millie Davis
- Theme music composer: Michael Richard Plowman; Justin Tranter
- Opening theme: Justin Tranter
- Composers: Jack Kitchen; Michael Richard Plowman; Justin Tranter
- Country of origin: Canada
- Original language: English
- No. of seasons: 2
- No. of episodes: 26

Production
- Executive producers: Aly Jetha; Shabnam Rezaei
- Production locations: United States; Canada
- Editor: Randy Rogel
- Running time: 12 minutes
- Production company: Big Bad Boo Studios

Original release
- Network: Hulu
- Release: June 21, 2019 – June 20, 2025

The Bravest Knight is a Canadian animated television series, produced by Big Bad Boo Studios and a Hulu original, which became the first kids original on the streaming service. The first episodes were added to the streaming service on June 21, 2019 and the other eight on October 11, 2019. The show was created by Daniel Errico and directed by Shabnam Rezaei. It is a fantasy and adventure story focused on how a young pumpkin farmer turned into the "bravest knight" through wild adventures across the lands, which he tells his adopted daughter. The series is one of the first all-ages animations to have an "openly gay main character".

On February 20, 2024, it was announced a second season was in production. The first part of season 2 was released on December 13, 2024. The second part of season 2 was released on June 20, 2025.

== Premise ==
Cedric, formerly a pumpkin farmer and now married to a prince named Andrew, tells the story of how he became the "greatest knight" to his 10-year-old adopted daughter, Nia.

In an attempt to get Nia, a not-yet-knight, to learn from his example, he recounts the challenges he encountered along the way, accompanied by his friend Grunt. Nia, in the process, learns how to be her "best self" and that being a knight is more than just slaying dragons.

== Characters ==
=== Main ===
- Sir Cedric (voiced by T. R. Knight (older) and Chance Hurstfield; Desmond Sivan (season 2) (younger)) is a knight and husband of Prince Andrew, who is the father of Nia, their adopted daughter. He is friends with Grunt and a raven named Saylor.
- Grunt (voiced by Bobby Moynihan) is a troll who is a friend and traveling companion of Cedric when he was a not-yet-knight.
- Nia (voiced by Storm Reid; Millie Davis (season 2)) is the adopted 10-year-old daughter of Sir Cedric and Prince Andrew.

=== Supporting ===
- Prince Andrew (voiced by Wilson Cruz) is a prince, husband of Sir Cedric, and father of Nia.
- The Head Knight (voiced by Steven Weber) is the head of the Knights Declarant and dismissive of help from others, like Grunt, Cedric, and Saylor, leading them to believe that he won't help them in future quests.
- Saylor (voiced by Teri Polo) is a messenger raven who travels with Cedric and Grunt in their journeys. She is also a friend of Nia, Andrew, Cedric, and Grunt.
- Daisy (voiced by Shannon Chan-Kent) is a magical talking flute which helps Cedric and his friends on their quest.
- Cho (voiced by Margaret Cho) is a gnome who helps Cedric, Grunt and Saylor.

=== Other characters ===
- The Dragon (voiced by Christine Baranski) is the dragon that is menacing the kingdom when Cedric is a not-yet knight.
- The King (voiced by Emilio Delgado) is the king of the kingdom when Cedric is a not-yet knight.
- The Queen (voiced by Adriana Sananes) is the queen of the kingdom when Cedric is a not-yet knight.
- Susie (voiced by Rebecca Husain) is a green troll they meet at a jousting competition.
- Eyame the Green Leaf (voiced by Storm Reid (season 1); Millie Davis (season 2)) is a jousting competitor of Cedric and also a not-yet-knight.
- Big Yeti (voiced by Kathleen Barr) is a yeti which menaces Cedric and Grunt, and ends up being the mother of the Itty Bitty Yeti.
- Itty Bitty Yeti (voiced by Kyle Rideout) is a yeti which is the child of the Big Yeti.
- The Giant (voiced by Brian Drummond) is a huge giant that greedily captures Cedric and Grunt.
- The Potion Maker (voiced by Paul Sun-Hyung Lee) is a person who makes a potion that tells a prophecy of Cedric and Grunt's future.
- Stanley the Big Bad Wolf (voiced by RuPaul) is a misunderstood wolf that blows down the houses in Bricktown before Cedric and his friends put a stop to him, who crossdresses in women's clothing.
- Francine (voiced by Julie Nathanson) is a sheep terrified of the wolf blowing down the houses in Bricktown. Nathansan called Francine "one of the funniest characters" she had ever voiced.
- Mayor Hobble (voiced by Benjie Randall (Note: Randall was also casting and voice over director for the show)) is the mayor of Bricktown, who renamed the town in a failed effort to deter the wolf.
- Mona the Mayor (voiced by Wanda Sykes) is the mayor, librarian, music coordinator, and much more in a place known as Quiet Town.
- Sturk (voiced by Brian Drummond) is a mean-tempered troll which the dragon released from Fairy Jail, stole Grunt's bridge, and kicked him out of his home.
- Lily the Fairy (voiced by Jazz Jennings) is a magical fairy that Cedric and Grunt save from a downpour. She is the daughter of another fairy named Lucy.
- Lucy the Fairy (voiced by AJ McLean) is a magical fairy who is the father of Lily, and uses fairy dust to steal Grunt's grapes.
- Trulla (voiced by Donna Murphy) is an evil witch who fights Cedric, Grunt, and Saylor.
- Admiral Akers (voiced by Asia Kate Dillon) is an admiral who helps Cedric, Grunt and Saylor to go a cave. Admiral Akers uses they/them pronouns.
- Captain Fuzzyweather (voiced by Emily Hampshire)
- Venus (voiced by Elizabeth Hurley)

== Episodes ==
Season	Episodes	Originally released	
Season	Episodes	First released	Last released
1	13	June 21, 2019	October 11, 2019
2	13	December 13, 2024	April 18, 2025

=== Season 1 (2019) ===
No. overall	No. in season	Title	Original release date	Prod. code
1	1	"Cedric & the Troll"	June 21, 2019	1TBK01
While Nia learns how to save someone from a tower, Cedric tells of when he met Grunt, a troll, and how both escaped a witch who tricked them.
2	2	"Cedric & the Green Leaf"	June 21, 2019	1TBK02
A jousting lesson for Nia morphs into a story of when Cedric, as a not-yet-knight, had a tournament as a jouster, and the lesson to never underestimate whoever is your opponent.
3	3	"Cedric & the Cave"	June 21, 2019	1TBK03
As Nia learns how to use tracks, Cedric tells her of the time when he and grunt hid in a cave from a Yeti and how they were able to escape by using the resources they had at hand.
4	4	"Cedric & the Giant"	June 21, 2019	1TBK04
Nia learns the importance of being generous, as a member of the kingdom's royal family. In the process, Cedric remembers back to when a giant greedily captures him and Grunt, forcing both to ask a magic flute for help to get them out of their predicament.
5	5	"Cedric & the Fairies"	June 21, 2019	1TBK05
Cedric tells a story of how he helped fairies who are threatened by a bear as he tries to stop Grunt and Nia from fighting each other.
6	6	"Cedric & the Dark Castle"	October 11, 2019	1TBK06
In an effort to find a map that shows where Grunt's bridge is, Grunt and Cedric sneak inside the Dark Castle. While they can't find anything inside, not even in the Hall of Records, they find and free Saylor, and have to escape the castle before the dragon slumbering nearby finds them.
7	7	"Cedric & the Wizard"	October 11, 2019	1TBK07
In an attempt to tell the King and Queen about the dragon in the Dark Castle, Cedric and his two friends travel to the Royal Castle. However, when a wizard comes and freezes everyone in sight, these heroes have to come with a plan to stop her in her tracks.
8	8	"Cedric & the Sea Monster"	October 11, 2019	1TBK08
The interest of Nia in the nearby Serpent River leads to a story from Cedric about a time that a sea monster pulled the boat which he, Saylor, and Grunt were on, underwater and their daring escape.
9	9	"Cedric & the Potion Maker"	October 11, 2019	1TBK09
Cedric tells Nia the story of a magical dragon scale, a person who makes potions, and a newt that spits lava, learning the importance of believing in herself.
10	10	"Cedric & the Big Bad Wolf"	October 11, 2019	1TBK10
Coming to a carrot farm in an attempt to help a person in need, Cedric tells Nia about a time that he, Saylor, and Grunt, saved a town from a wolf who was seen as menacing but was actually misunderstood.
11	11	"Cedric & the Pixies"	October 11, 2019	1TBK11
Nia, overwhelmed with her responsibilities as a not-yet knight, is told another story by her dad, Cedric, who tells of a time when he was also overwhelmed when a group of rambunctious pixies caused mayhem in a place known as Quiet Town.
12	12	"Cedric & the Dragon"	October 11, 2019	1TBK12
Cedric and his two friends are trapped in a cave by the dragon which has been causing chaos throughout the kingdom. Only with a riddle and luck, they have a chance to get past her, which allow them to complete their quest.
13	13	"Grunt & the Bridge"	October 11, 2019	1TBK13
At long last, Saylor, Cedric, and Grunt finally reach their destination: Grunt's bridge. They have to defeat a troll named Sturk who stole the bridge from Grunt, and in a contest, Grunt has to use his smarts in order to retake his home.

=== Season 2 (2024–25) ===
CBC Gem released the episodes in two batches, 1-6 on 13 December 2024 and 7-13 on 18 April 2025. CBC Kids televised the releases in order one episode per Sunday morning following their online releases as follows:

- s2e1 Cedric and the Prince of Frogs 15 December 2024
- s2e2 Cedric and the Three Ogres 22 December 2024
- s2e3 Cedric and the Thief 27 December 2024
- s2e4 Cedric and Mill Town 3 January 2025
- s2e5 Cedric and Rumpelstiltskin 10 January 2025
- s2e6 Cedric and the Hansel and Gretel 17 January 2025
- s2e7 Cedric and the Gnomes 20 April 2025
- s2e8 Cedric and Pirate Cove 27 April 2025
- s2e9 Cedric and the Royal Castle 4 May 2025
- s2e10 Cedric and the Genie 11 May 2025
- s2e11 Cedric and Mayor Hobble 18 May 2025
- s2e12 The Green Leaf and Cedric 25 May 2025
- s2e13 Cedric and Snow Mountain 1 June 2025

== Promotion, production, and release ==
The show is based on Errico's novel The Bravest Knight Who Ever Lived and a short animation which premiered in 2015 of the same name.

Shabnam Rezaei, who founded Big Bad Boo Studios with her husband Aly Jetha, was the producer of the series. Rezaei later said that it has been a "pleasure to work alongside Hulu." She also said that the show is teaching life lessons and called it an "adventure about how to be a great knight" and how to be a good person. She also remained confident the show would air in Canada, parts of Western Europe, the UK, and Australia. The show itself was greenlit by Hulu in November 2017 and went into production in early 2018, with "approximately 120 people working on the show," with Errico and Randy Rogel writing the stories for each episode, with the animation done in Vancouver. The show was supervised by Eddie Soriano, while Paddy Gillen was VP of production, and Benjie Randall was the casting director. The show's biggest challenge was, as Rezaei admitted, the budget, in trying to cast big-name stars like RuPaul and Wanda Sykes.

Apart from this, Enrico, in a September 2019 interview, said that he was inspired to create the character after reading fairytales and trying to create "multi-dimensional protagonists who also happened to be gay," but stated that it was not a sure thing that Hulu would take the series. He also said that while he hasn't had the opportunity of working with many other writers, he realizes that as a white and cisgender man, that "fair access to opportunities in family entertainment demands a dedication to change," with the necessity of working with "creative writers of color." Furthermore, he said that each episode has a lesson, and to touch on themes like self-confidence, forgiveness, and a message of "being yourself and being true to yourself." Elsewhere he stated the importance of "giving children more role models, more diverse examples or heroes" and noted that most networks he approached with the story were "resistant to having an LGBTQ protagonist," but Hulu gave the show a green light.

== Reception ==
The series was positively received. GLAAD's chief communications officer, Rich Ferraro, praised the series as bringing "important lessons about diversity and acceptance to young audiences," giving children with gay parents an "animated family that they can relate to and applaud." Curtis M. Wong of HuffPost called the series "forward-thinking" and "LGBTQ-inclusive." Jamie Sugah of The Geekiary was also supportive, saying that the show will "join the ranks of children's programming that has featured openly LGBTQ+ characters" and applauded Hulu, and platforms like Netflix for "creating this sort of content for children" which features "an interracial gay couple and their daughter." In contrast, Lapacazo Sandoval in the Los Angeles Sentinel criticized the series for "coloring in a Black or Brown character" in the series, since the creator is a White man, rather than someone from the Black community, even as he called it a "good show." Similarly, James Michael Nichols of HuffPost said that the series helps make the representation of "the whole spectrum of human love and experience" a reality and Brian T. Carney of the Washington Blade described the series as family-friendly, having a terrific voice cast, along with lively and colorful animation, and presenting "issues of diversity in an age-appropriate and matter-of-fact manner." Additionally, Joyce Slaton of Common Sense Media stated that there are "stellar messages" in the series, with a "same-sex relationship at the emotional heart of the story," toned down violence, with heroes often using their wits to "escape dangerous situations than to physically fight." Slayton also remarked that the "gentle messages" of the series are "easy to love."

The show was praised for being "groundbreaking" because it features a household of two dads (Cedic and Andrew), making it one of the first all-ages animations to have an "openly gay main character." Justin Tranter, a board member of GLAAD, composed the opening theme song of the series. The series also generated considerable debate, with a "fierce battle" on the show's Facebook page between those who defended it and critics from the religious right who criticized it. The series later won the MIPCOM Diversify TV Excellence award in kids' programming at the MIPCOM Diversify TV Excellence awards in October 2019.

== Awards & Nominations ==
- 2022, RuPaul won Best Performance, Animation at the 10th Canadian Screen Awards, for his voiced portrayal of 'Stanley the Big Bad Wolf' in series 1.
- 2026, Shabnam Rezaei and Eddie Soriano were nominated for Best Direction, Animation at the 14th Canadian Screen Awards, for direction of s2e7 "Cedric and the Gnomes" 20 April 2025 in series 2.
- 2026, Emily Hampshire was nominated for Best Voice Performance at the 14th Canadian Screen Awards, for her voiced portrayal of 'Captain Fuzzyweather' in series 2.

== See also ==
- Gay bashing
- Gay village
- List of animated series with LGBTQ characters
- List of lesbian, gay, bisexual or transgender-related films
