= Ali Pourtash =

Ali Pourtash is an actor and comedian of Iranian cinema. Having worked in numerous plays, films, TV shows and stage productions in Tehran and in Los Angeles Pourtash was most recently seen in the 2008 film The Stoning of Soraya M. directed by Cyrus Nowrasteh. Other notable roles include the role of Haji firouz, the comedic side-kick to Amoo norooz in the classic holiday special Babak and Friends - A First Norooz.

== Filmography ==
=== Actor ===
- Checkpoint (film) (1987)
- Gohar-e shab cheragh (1998)
- Babak and Friends- A First Norooz (2005)
- Futbaal: The Price of Dreams (2007)
- The Stoning of Soraya M. (2008)

== Other work ==
In 2009, Pourtash served as an official festival judge for the Noor Iranian Film Festival in Los Angeles.
