= 16 Hudson =

Canadian animated series

16 Hudson is a Canadian animated series, produced by Big Bad Boo about four friends, Lili, Sam, Amala and Luc, living in a small apartment in a big city. The series was created by Shabnam Rezaei and based on the fifteen-episode miniseries Lili & Lola from 2015. 16 Hudson gained international recognition in October 2021 by winning the MIPCOM Diversify TV Award in Cannes, France, up against Disney and the BBC. Prior to the release of the first season were prequel episodes about Lili and Lola. Seasons 1 and 2 had 39 episodes each. Season 1 aired from 2019 to 2020, while season 2 aired from 2020 to 2021. The third season, which aired from 2021 to 2022, had 21 episodes. The series was renewed for a fourth season, which premiered on October 26, 2025.

== Synopsis ==
Tells the story of neighbors who recognize their differences, similarities, and go on adventures together, as friendships are strengthened. Holidays such as Norooz, Diwali, and Chinese New Year are celebrated by the series characters.

== Episodes ==
=== Prequel (Season 0) ===
No. in series	Title	Original release date
1	"The Light Bulb"	TBA
2	"Small"	TBA
3	"Lili Picasso"	TBA
4	"Lili Detective"	TBA
5	"Norooz"	TBA
6	"The Four Season"	TBA
7	"The Music Box"	TBA
8	"Thanks But No Thanks"	TBA
9	"Baba's Ice Cream Part 1"	TBA
10	"Baba's Ice Cream Part 2"	TBA
11	"Lola's Fancy Dress"	TBA
12	"Movie Night"	TBA
13	"Story Time"	TBA
14	"Trouble in Pardis"	TBA
15	"Snow Day"	TBA

=== Season 1 ===
No. in series	Title	Original release date
1	"Home Remedies"	August 18, 2018
2	"Twice the Magic"	August 23, 2018
3	"The Tooth Fairy"	August 28, 2018
4	"Amala's Big Dig"	August 30, 2018
5	"Huggle Day"	September 4, 2018
6	"Long Gone Dugong"	September 7, 2018
7	"Lili's Skating Badge"	TBA
8	"Super Rainbow Macaron"	TBA
9	"Toothbrush #3"	TBA
10	"Ivan From Outer Space"	TBA
11	"Best Frenemies"	TBA
12	"Luc's Super Shoes"	TBA
13	"Fix-It Sam"	TBA
14	"I Heart Lucy"	TBA
15	"Treehouse Trouble"	TBA
16	"Double Dad's Day"	TBA
17	"Monkey King"	TBA
18	"Dress Up Mess Up"	TBA
19	"Lemonade"	TBA
20	"The Last Samosa"	TBA
21	"Stick to It"	TBA
22	"Finders Keepers"	TBA
23	"Apples, Raisins, & Onions, Oh My!"	TBA
24	"What a Spectacle"	TBA
25	"Chinese School of Rock"	TBA
26	"Mr. K"	TBA
27	"An Henri in Need"	TBA
28	"Mountain Lyin'"	TBA
29	"Where's Daddy"	TBA
30	"Sticky Fingers"	TBA
31	"Big"	TBA
32	"Tree's Company"	TBA
33	"Whose Side Are You On?"	TBA
34	"L-A-T-E"	TBA
35	"My Pal Lionel"	TBA
36	"You Snooze, You Lose"	TBA
37	"Lucky Sam"	TBA
38	"The Light Fantastic"	TBA
39	"Lili's New Year"	TBA

=== Season 2 ===
No. in series	Title	Original release date
1	"The Blob that Everyone Ate"	September 8, 2020
2	"Lacrosse Purposes"	September 10, 2020
3	"Picture Perfect"	September 15, 2020
4	"Roof of the Brave"	September 17, 2020
5	"Mezopitzonia"	September 21, 2020
6	"Tickle Tornado"	September 24, 2020
7	"Sam's Singing Smiles"	September 29, 2020
8	"Jazzbot"	October 1, 2020
9	"Operation Nanni"	October 6, 2020
10	"Friendsgiving"	October 8, 2020
11	"Luc's Very Bad Day"	October 13, 2020
12	"Bird's Eye View"	October 15, 2020
13	"Fair Game"	October 20, 2020
14	"Act Smart"	October 22, 2020
15	"Cool Eddie"	October 27, 2020
16	"Unfair Fun Fair"	October 29, 2020
17	"Thanks, But No Pranks"	November 3, 2020
18	"Hudson We Have A Problem"	November 5, 2020
19	"Cool to Be Kind"	November 10, 2020
20	"Stone Soup"	November 12, 2020
21	"Social Butterfly"	November 17, 2020
22	"The Jig Is Up"	November 19, 2020
23	"Smell You Later"	November 24, 2020
24	"The Pit Crew"	November 26, 2020
25	"Happy Tavalod to You"	December 1, 2020
26	"Amala's No Talent Show"	December 3, 2020
27	"The Tell Tale Robot"	December 10, 2020
28	"The Great Race"	December 15, 2020
29	"Octopus Pancakes"	December 17, 2020
30	"Ritika T Butterfly"	December 22, 2020
31	"Perky Pup"	January 5, 2021
32	"Dirty Dishes"	January 7, 2021
33	"Seaweed Sam"	January 12, 2021
34	"Welcome"	January 24, 2021
35	"Best Behavior"	TBA
36	"Follow The Leader"	TBA
37	"Luc's Feast"	TBA
38	"The Buddy Zone"	TBA
39	"Winter is the Best"	TBA

"A 16 Hudson Christmas Tree", "The Feather", and "Moon Festival" are special episodes.

=== Season 3 ===
No. in series	Title	Original release date
1	"The Bloopians Are Coming!"	July 11, 2022
2	"Nye-Nye Paints It Out"	July 18, 2022
3	"Home Improvements"	TBA
4	"Spice Box"	TBA
5	"Out of Step"	TBA
6	"Home Games"	TBA
7	"Non Voyage"	TBA
8	"Lili's Big Adventure"	TBA
9	"Souvenir"	TBA
10	"Hands"	TBA
11	"Gathering Storm"	TBA
12	"Take Your Pick"	TBA
13	"The Perfect Room"	TBA
14	"Zero Bars"	TBA
15	"Passcode"	TBA
16	"The Great 16 Hudson Bake-Off"	TBA
17	"Bro-Bot"	TBA
18	"Putting Down Roots"	TBA
19	"Lucy Come Home"	TBA
20	"Bust a Move"	TBA
21	"16 Hudson Is..."	TBA

=== Season 4 ===
No. in series	Title	Original release date
1	"Super Surprise"	October 26, 2025
2	"Who is the Super, Really?"	TBA
3	"Third Wheel"	TBA
4	"Lizard on the Loose"	TBA
5	"Wedding Planner"	TBA
6	"Who Does it Better?"	TBA
7	"Amanda's Best Holi"	TBA
8	"Bunny Blues"	TBA

== Production and broadcast ==
On 27 March 2015, it was announced that Big Bad Boo Studios had agreed to partner with TVOKids to begin developing the series, marking the fifth original program of the studio. The following year, on 11 October 2016, the series was greenlighted by TVOKids for a one-season order.

The series began broadcasting its first season on TVOKids on August 21, 2018, and Knowledge Kids since September 3, 2018, followed by French channels Ici Radio-Canada Première and TFO. The series also has aired on Amazon Prime in the U.S. since July 2020. Big Bad Boo Studios launched a workshop series for BIPOC people in December 2020, including creating a diverse writers room for the series.

The first two seasons each have 39 episodes, which are each 7 minutes long. A series of five ER (emergency room) shorts were put out as PSAs in response to COVID-19. The third season sees the friends traveling to heritage countries like China and India and visiting relatives, with the series creator, Shabnam Rezaei, describing the episodes as "very special" and "a very Canadian story." Previous seasons had introduced a refugee family from Kurdistan, and was praised for emphasizing diversity among the cast and its "non-traditional characters" like Luc, who has two dads. This third season contains 21 episodes, each approximately seven minutes long, plus five more (total 10) ER shorts. This brings the total episodes in the franchise to 124 episodes. The first five ER shorts, entitled "Lola's Sneezing School", "Washing Hands", "Coronavirus Game Show", "Social Distancing", and "Luc's New Hour" s released in April 2020. An additional five released in summer 2020, bringing the total to ten.

In September 2021, the series was nominated for the MIPCOM Diversify TV Excellence Award for Representation of Diversity in Kids' Programming in the preschool category, competing against JoJo & Gran Gran and Mira, Royal Detective. The same year, the cat character, Kensington "Kenny G", voiced by Marcus Mosely, had a spin-off series entitled ABC with Kenny G, also produced by Big Bad Boo Studios and created by Rezaei. 16 Hudson also won two awards at the 2021 LEO Awards in July of that year and nominated for Awards of Excellence by the Youth Media Alliance.

In July 2022, the series won an award at the Kidscreen Awards, for "Best Inclusivity" in Kids Programming. In February 2023, the series episode "Spice Box" was nominated for an award for Best Writing in Animation by the Canadian Screen Awards.

In May 2023, the fourth season was put in production. The fourth season premiered on October 26, 2025. The season will have 21 episodes each of which are seven minutes long.
