= 1001 Nights (TV series) =

- Logo
- Created by: Aly Jetha; Shabnam Rezaei
- Directed by: Chad Van De Keere; Eddie Soriano
- Voices of: Nicole Oliver; Tabitha St. Germain; Colin Murdock; Trevor Devall; Cathy Weseluck; Peter Kelamis; Scott McNeil
- Theme music composer: Randy Rogel; Michael Richard Plowman
- Composer: Michael Richard Plowman
- Country of origin: Canada
- Original language: English
- No. of seasons: 2
- No. of episodes: 26 (52 segments) (list of episodes)

Production
- Producers: Aly Jetha; Shabnam Rezaei
- Production company: Big Bad Boo

Original release
- Network: Teletoon; Radio Canada
- Release: December 25, 2011 – August 9, 2012

1001 Nights is a Canadian animated television series developed and produced at Big Bad Boo Studios in Vancouver, based on stories from One Thousand and One Nights. The show is created and co-directed by Shabnam Rezaei and Aly Jetha.

Borrowing from the original premise of the classical tales of One Thousand and One Nights, the TV series features Scheherazade, the storyteller, in a Persian court with her sister Donyazad, King Shahryar, Prince Shahzaman and a playful monkey named Maymoon. The show premiered on Teletoon in Canada on December 25, 2011, and on Radio Canada in French-speaking Canada. In the United States, the show premiered on local PBS stations in 2012. This is the first time a media company has serialized the books of One Thousand and One Nights into an animated TV series for children.

== Premise ==
Another day at King Shahryar's court and another problem presents itself. Does Shahryar have a toothache? Is Maymoon "borrowing" Shahzaman's pistachios? Scheherazade always has a delightful story that will entertain and teach everyone a great lesson. She will often use the court characters in her stories. There are also a number of recurring characters such as Sinbad and Dina, Mujab and Samir and Harun al-Rashid. A red herring is presented in each episode such as a flying carpet which leaves room for the stories to continue.

== Episodes ==
=== Season 1 (2011) ===
No. overall	No. in season	Title	Written by	Original release date
1a	1a	"The Joke's on You"	Victor Nicolle	December 25, 2011
1b	1b	"King Bitehard"	Victor Nicolle	December 25, 2011
2a	2a	"Sinbad & the Valley of Serpents"	Michael Erskine Kellie	January 1, 2012
2b	2b	"Manjab's Just Desserts"	Steven Sullivan, Ursula Ziegler-Sullivan	January 1, 2012
3a	3a	"Princess Rou"	Michael Erskine-Kellie, Victor Nicolle	January 8, 2012
3b	3b	"What's Yours Is Mine"	Michael Erskine-Kellie, Victor Nicolle	January 8, 2012
4a	4a	"True Treasure"	Steven Sullivan, Ursula Ziegler-Sullivan	January 15, 2012
4b	4b	"Sinbad and the Cyclops"	Steven Sullivan, Ursula Ziegler-Sullivan	TBA
5a	5a	"Hunchback's Tale"	Larry Raskin, Randy Rogel, Colin Yardley	TBA
5b	5b	"Agrabroka"	Larry Raskin, Randy Rogel, Colin Yardley	TBA
6a	6a	"Give Until It Hurts"	Eric Lewald, Julia Lewald, Victor Nicolle	TBA
6b	6b	"Ali Baba and the Forty Thieves"	Eric Lewald, Julia Lewald, Victor Nicolle	TBA
7a	7a	"Keeping Up with the Jinns"	Steven Sullivan, Ursula Ziegler-Sullivan	TBA
7b	7b	"King for a Day"	Steven Sullivan, Ursula Ziegler-Sullivan	TBA
8a	8a	"Abu Sabir"	Michael Erskine-Kellie, Shabnam Rezaei	TBA
8b	8b	"Bigger Badder Badr"	Michael Erskine-Kellie, Shabnam Rezaei	TBA
9a	9a	"The Boy Who Cried Science"	Philippe Ivanusic-Vallée, Eric Lewald, Randy Rogel	TBA
9b	9b	"Prince Ahmad"	Philippe Ivanusic-Vallée, Eric Lewald, Randy Rogel	TBA
10a	10a	"It's a Steal"	Philippe Ivanusic-Vallée, Davila LeBlanc	TBA
10b	10b	"Which Way Is Up?"	Philippe Ivanusic-Vallée, Davila LeBlanc	TBA
11a	11a	"To Hatch a Thief"	Philippe Ivanusic-Vallée, Eric Lewald, Atul N. Rao	TBA
11b	11b	"The Gift of Norooz"	Philippe Ivanusic-Vallée, Eric Lewald, Atul N. Rao	TBA
12a	12a	"Creature Karma"	Charles Horn, Julia Lewald, Atul N. Rao	TBA
12b	12b	"Just My Luck"	Charles Horn, Julia Lewald, Atul N. Rao	TBA
13a	13a	"Details, Details..."	Larry Raskin, Shabnam Rezaei, Colin Yardley, Franklin Young	TBA
13b	13b	"Sinbad in Solitude"	Larry Raskin, Shabnam Rezaei, Colin Yardley, Franklin Young	TBA

=== Season 2 (2012) ===
No. overall	No. in season	Title	Written by	Original release date
14a	1a	"The Tale of Taymour and Tiny"	Victor Nicolle	January 15, 2012
14b	1b	"The Boy and the Panther"	Victor Nicolle	January 15, 2012
15a	2a	"Abu Kassim's Smelly Shoes"	Randy Rogel	January 22, 2012
15b	2b	"Bandits of Basra"	Randy Rogel, Bill Kopp	January 22, 2012
16a	3a	"The Genie, the Fish, the Wolf and the Witch"	Michael Erskine-Kellie, Victor Nicolle	May 16, 2012
16b	3b	"The Forbidden City of Shenzhen"	Michael Erskine-Kellie, Victor Nicolle	May 16, 2012
17a	4a	"The Broken Jewel"	Steven Sullivan, Ursula Ziegler-Sullivan	February 5, 2012
17b	4b	"The Boy Who Became a Genie"	Steven Sullivan, Ursula Ziegler-Sullivan	February 5, 2012
18a	5a	"The Tale of the Mountain and the Valley"	Larry Raskin, Randy Rogel, Colin Yardley	May 10, 2012
18b	5b	"Three Tales of a Daydreaming Boy"	Larry Raskin, Randy Rogel, Colin Yardley	May 10, 2012
19a	6a	"The Riddle of the Ruined Tomb"	Eric Lewald, Julia Lewald, Victor Nicolle	May 10, 2012
19b	6b	"The Merchant and the Pickpocket"	Eric Lewald, Julia Lewald, Victor Nicolle	May 10, 2012
20a	7a	"Arman the Cheat"	Steven Sullivan, Ursula Ziegler-Sullivan	TBA
20b	7b	"Abu Hassan's Legendary Wedding"	Steven Sullivan, Ursula Ziegler-Sullivan	TBA
21a	8a	"The King Who Became a Slave"	Michael Erskine-Kellie, Shabnam Rezaei	TBA
21b	8b	"The Spoon That Ruined Everything"	Michael Erskine-Kellie, Shabnam Rezaei	TBA
22a	9a	"The King Who Outlawed Laughter"	Philippe Ivanusic-Vallée, Eric Lewald, Randy Rogel	TBA
22b	9b	"Sinbad and the Black Diamond"	Philippe Ivanusic-Vallée, Eric Lewald, Randy Rogel	TBA
23a	10a	"The Man Who Went Back in Time"	Philippe Ivanusic-Vallée, Davila LeBlanc	TBA
23b	10b	"The Schoolmaster"	Philippe Ivanusic-Vallée, Davila LeBlanc	TBA
24a	11a	"The Tale of the Haunted Palace"	Philippe Ivanusic-Vallée, Eric Lewald, Atul N. Rao	TBA
24b	11b	"Habib and the Baby Genie"	Philippe Ivanusic-Vallée, Eric Lewald, Atul N. Rao	TBA
25a	12a	"Three Tales of a Daydreaming Girl"	Charles Horn, Julia Lewald, Atul N. Rao	TBA
25b	12b	"Abu Mohammad Lazybones"	Charles Horn, Julia Lewald, Atul N. Rao	TBA
26a	13a	"Sinbad Forever"	Larry Raskin, Shabnam Rezaei, Colin Yardley, Franklin Young	TBA
26b	13b	"One Thousand and One Nights"	Larry Raskin, Shabnam Rezaei, Colin Yardley, Franklin Young	TBA

== Characters ==
=== Scheherazade ===
Voiced by Nicole Oliver

Confident and older than her years, Scheherazade is savvy, quick-witted, and no nonsense in her dealings with Donyazad and Shahzaman. She is married to King Shahryar. She serves the role of queen, mother, educator and peace-keeper and it is through her that we are told many captivating stories. Scheherazade lives in the palace and is the daughter of Majid, Shahryar's vizier.

=== Shahryar ===
Voiced by Colin Murdock

Shahryar is slightly older than his wife Scheherazade, and has little experience or knowledge of what it takes to make a good king. He is unintentionally selfish, arrogant, pompous, and spoiled. He is also innocent and childlike because he is a prince who has been catered to his entire life. He says whatever is on his mind, no matter how bumbling or stupid it might sound. Often when Scheherazade is telling a story to the kids, Shahryar is listening in and will draw the wrong message.

=== Donyazad ===
Voiced by Tabitha St. Germain

Donyazad is Scheherazade's younger sister. She is ten years old, bright, independent, and feisty. She loves and respects her older sister who has essentially become her mother figure. Donyazad often tussles with Shahazman. Although they are not related, they have a typical brother-sister relationship. They are close to one another but are often at odds. Of the two, Donyazad is the smarter. She's also more sensitive and aware.

=== Shahzaman ===
Voiced by Cathy Weseluck

Shahzaman is Shahryar's eleven-year-old brother and therefore, he is a prince. He is a younger version of Shahryar, i.e. spoiled with a sense of entitlement. Even though he's a prince, he is like any other boy who loves sports, games, sweets, and play time. He gets into mischief and he endlessly teases Donyazad. He's a practical joker and often insensitive to other people's feelings. Still, he's loveable and when faced with issues, he and Donyazad make a good team.

=== Majid ===
Voiced by Peter Kelamis

Majid is Shahryar's vizier, i.e. high counselor. He is also Scheherazade's father. He is about fifty years old and supposedly the wise and learned man of the court. Majid frequently finds himself trying to calm Shahryar down when the king is throwing a temper tantrum. He is sycophantic towards Shahryar whereas Scheherazade is smarter and subtler in her approach. She's often able to change Shahryar's behaviour just by telling him a story. Whereas Majid is often afraid of his son-in-law, Scheherazade has no trouble standing up to him.

=== Maymoon ===
Voiced by Scott McNeil

Maymoon is a mischievous pet monkey who belongs to Shahzaman. He is playful and loving and is a regular member of the court. He often outwits Shahryar and like all the other characters is used often as a character in Scheherazade's stories.

== Production history ==
The idea for the show came to co-creator Shabnam Rezaei in a dream. Her father read stories from One Thousand and One Nights in her native country Iran. Together with partner Aly Jetha, Series and Creative Director Chad Van De Keere, story editor Randy Rogel as well as the Big Bad Boo team, they formulated the 1001 Nights TV series, which would be appropriate for a modern audience.

== Reception ==
1001 Nights came in the # 1 show at the 2011 at the Mip Junior awards among 1027 other children's properties. It was a finalist in the 2010 Mip Junior Licensing Challenge and # 6 in the Top 30 that year.

== Awards and nominations ==
1001 Nights was nominated for eleven (and won four) Leo Awards from 2010 to 2013.

Year	Award Category	Notes	Result
2010	Best Animation Program or Series		Nominated
2010	Best Direction/Storyboarding in an Animation Program or Series	Chad Van De Keere for episode "What's Yours Is Mine"	Nominated
2010	Best Screenwriting in an Animation Program or Series	For episode "What's Yours Is Mine"	Nominated
2010	Best Overall Sound in an Animation Program or Series	For episode "Sinbad and the Valley of Serpents"	Nominated
2011	Best Screenwriting in an Animation Program or Series	For episode "Sinbad in Solitude"	Nominated
2011	Best Direction/Storyboarding in an Animation Program or Series	Chad Van De Keere for episode "The Boy Who Cried Science"	Nominated
2012	Best Screenwriting in an Animation Program or Series	Shabnam Rezaei for episode "Sinbad & The Black Diamond"	Won
2012	Best Animation Program or Series	Producers Aly Jetha & Shabnam Rezaei	Won
2012	Best Overall Sound	For episode "Abu Hassan's Legendary Wedding"	Won
2013	Best Screenwriting in an Animation Program or Series	Shabnam Rezaei and Aly Jetha for episode "The Tale of the Mountain & The Valley"	Won
2013	Best Animation Program or Series	Producers Aly Jetha & Shabnam Rezaei	Nominated
