= Babak and Friends =

Babak and Friends - A First Norooz is a direct-to-DVD animated film by Norooz Productions, later renamed Big Bad Boo Studios. The 33-minute animated cartoon was released in 2005. The film was made to teach children about the Persian New Year Norooz, celebrating the coming of spring and is about a little boy named Babak who is stuck between being Iranian and being American. Through a dream and magical visit by Amoo norooz, Babak learns to be proud of his heritage and celebrates the New Year with his family.

The movie was produced by Aly Jetha, Shabnam Rezaei, Matt Hullum, Dustin Ellis, and Mastaneh Moghadam, and written and directed by Dustin Ellis. It included the voices of oscar-nominee Shohreh Aghdashloo, Parviz Sayyad, Ali Pourtash and Catherine Bell. It was the first time the character of Amoo Norooz was animated in Iranian history. The movie was produced in both English and Persian as a language-learning tool for Iranian-American children.

Babak and Friends - A First Norooz first screened in the Soho Apple Store Theatre and subsequently in other Apple stores and various museums such as Asia Society and The British Museum. The producers used this and other channels such as film festivals and Amazon to gain traction for distribution.
