= List of My Little Pony characters animated in the 2000s =

The list of characters from the 2003–2009 My Little Pony animated films and shorts.

The third incarnation of the My Little Pony franchise began in 2003, and is commonly referred to as "G3", as classified by collectors, following earlier lines and television show tie-ins in the 1980s and 1990s. During the early years of the "G3" Toyline, several direct-to-video specials were released, bundled with the toys of the "G3" line. This later gained its first feature length DTV movie titled My Little Pony: A Very Minty Christmas in 2005. This third toy line ended in 2009 with the film My Little Pony: Twinkle Wish Adventure.

The characters were portrayed in the specials as adults, while also having childlike personalities. Usually, all the ponies in the specials like to play; though some have "jobs" and businesses to run.

== Mainline Ponies ==
=== Earth Ponies ===
Name	Gender	Body Color	Hair Color	Cutie Mark	Year of Toy/Animation Debut	Animation Debut	Voiced by
Amberlocks	Female	Pink	Yellow and orange	Purple band with blonde hair wrapped around it tied with blue ribbons	2003	Twinkle Wish Adventure	Anna Cummer
Amberlocks appears in "Twinkle Wish Adventure" as background character. She is helping her friends look prettier and fancier than ever.
Applejack	Female	Red	Green and Yellow	Red apple on green and white checked picnic blanket	2003	Friends Are Never Far Away	Janyse Jaud
Applejack loves to pack a basket full of yummy treats and share them with her friends.
Apple Spice	Female	Yellow	Orange with Purple streak in mane	Big shiny red apple sitting beside of two small purple flowers	2004 (Animation); 2005 (Toy)	Dancing in the Clouds	Chiara Zanni
One of Twinkle Twirl's Students, Apple Spice owns an Apple Orchard at Butterfly Island. Usually she is the cause of some comedy relief in some Generation 3 specials, bumping into Bow Tie due to her clumsiness.
Blossomforth	Female	White	Deep pink	Three blue flowers with pink centers	2004	Dancing in the Clouds	Kathleen Barr
Blossomforth is an Earth Pony who was in 2004 alongside the Dance Jamboree set. Presumed to be one of Twinkle Twirl's students.
Bowtie	Female	White (Dancing in the Clouds to Pinkie Pie and Ladybug Jamboree)/ Light Blue (Twinkle Wish Adventure)	Dark Pink, Purple and Blue (Dancing in the Clouds to Pinkie Pie and Ladybug Jamboree)/Yellow and Light Purple (Twinkle Wish Adventure)	Three Bowties: Pink one, Blue one and Purple one	2004	Dancing in the Clouds	Kelly Sheridan
Bow Tie is one of Twinkle Twirl's students, who loves to dance but always bumps into other ponies due to her clumsiness.
Bumblesweet	Female	Honey Orange	Orange	Three Bees and yellow honeyjar	2004	My Little Pony: A Very Minty Christmas	Tabitha St. Germain
Bumblesweet is an earth pony who likes to make sweet things to eat, like fudge, jellybeans and rainbow colored taffy. She is also found of jump rope and likes to compete with Daisyjo.
Candy Cane	Female	White	Red and white	Candycane and holly	2003	A Charming Birthday	Tabitha St. Germain
She just loves the holidays, because her favorite thing in the world is to give presents to her friends and her gifts are always extra-special, because she makes them all herself.
Cheerilee	Female	Lilac (Before Meet the Ponies); Magenta (Meet the Ponies to Twinkle Wish Adventure)	Pink (Before Meet the Ponies); Purple, Pink and Light Pink (Meet the Ponies to Twinkle Wish Adventure)	Three Pink Flowers with glitter (Before Meet the Ponies); Pink Cherry Blossom with small green leaves and two smaller pink flowers (Meet the Ponies to Twinkle Wish Adventure)	2006 (Unicorn); 2008 (Earth Pony)	My Little Pony Crystal Princess: The Runaway Rainbow (As a Unicorn); My Little Pony: Meet the Ponies to My Little Pony: Twinkle Wish Adventure (As an Earth Pony)	Tracey Moore (The Runaway Rainbow to A Very Pony Place); Kelly Sheridan (Meet the Ponies to Twinkle Wish Adventure); Margo Herreid (Once upon a My Little Pony time)
Cheerilee is an Earth Pony, who's once a Unicorn in My Little Pony Crystal Princess: The Runaway Rainbow. She acts as Rarity's teacher and adviser. Alongside Brights Brightly, Whistle Wishes and Rarity, they were in charge on bringing in the first rainbow of the season until Rarity disappeared. Due to this, she, Brights Brightly and Whistle Wishes venture outside Unicornia to search for her. In the Core 7 series, she is now an earth pony and wears pigtails in the animation and in some of the merchandise. She loved flowers and enjoyed telling amazing stories. She is Scootaloo's older sister. As a baby, she wears a green bow on her head.
Coconut Cream	Female	White	Pink, Yellow and Green	coconut cream pie with a heart on top, and a green moon shape behind	2004 (Animation); 2005 (Toy)	Dancing in the Clouds	Kelly Sheridan
Also one of Twinkle Twirl's Students, Coconut Cream is an earth pony likes to ride the roller coaster, even though it makes her feel sick. She also dances gracefully on stage, but sometimes she trips on her own feet.
Cotton Candy	Female	Pink	Blue, Light Pink and White	Pink Cotton candy on a green Stick	2003 (Alongside the Cotton Candy Cafe Playset)	A Charming Birthday	Kelly Sheridan (A Charming Birthday to Pinkie Pie and Ladybug Jamboree), Anna Cummer (Twinkle Wish Adventure)
Cotton Candy is a sweet-lover, who runs the Cotton Candy Cafe where she serves ice cream and sundaes to her friends, as well as a storyteller, who enjoys the occasional conversation.
Daffidazey	Female	White	Yellow, Orange, Pink, Blue and Purple	Orange, Yellow and Purple flower with Three Green leaves.	2006	My Little Pony: The Princess Promenade	Ellen Kennedy
Daffidazey is Ponyville's hair stylist, who runs the Twist n' Style Petal Parlor. She values cleanliness highly and needs to wear her glasses when she reads. She also has good styling skills and even fixed up Spike, despite being dirty and all messed up.
Daisyjo	Female	Purple	Yellow	Two white daisies with green leaves	2003	My Little Pony: The Princess Promenade	Chiara Zanni
One of Ponyville's excellent Gardeners along Wysteria, Daisyjo grows the prettiest flowers in Ponyville, in all shapes and colors. She also likes to play hide-and-seek with Sparkleworks.
Desert Rose	Female	White	Light pink	Pink rose with glitter	2004 (Animation); 2005 (Toy)	Dancing in the Clouds	Tabitha St. Germain
Desert Rose is one of Twinkle Twirl's Students, who always has a pretty blossom to give her friends. She is also an expert gardener as well, as seen in My Little Pony: The Princess Promenade.
Fiesta Flair	Female	Yellow	Red	Pair of red Maracas	2006	Pinkie Pie and the Lady Bug Jamboree	Tabitha St. Germain
Fiesta Flair is an earth pony who was never actually produced as a toy. Many speculate that due to her Mexican accent, name and symbol there might have been backlash that caused Hasbro to rethink her development. In the special, she is actually part of Pinkie Pie's musical band, suggesting her to use her Pinkie Squink to solve their problem on playing together. She then later debuted in My Little Pony: Twinkle Wish Adventure as a background character.
Fizzy Pop	Female	Purple	Pink	Sundae with two yellow hearts and two straws	2004	Dancing in the Clouds	Anna Cummer
Fizzy Pop likes having fun in the sun. But her favorite activity is at night- watching a fireworks display over the water. She then later debuted in Dancing in the Clouds and later in My Little Pony: Twinkle Wish Adventure as a background character.
Flitter Flutter	Female	Pearly Yellow	Dark pink and dark purple	Flower and a Butterfly (First Release as part of the Scootin' Along Ponies); Heart Key and a Ribbon (Twinkle Wish Adventure version)	2005 (First Toy Release); 2009 (Animated release)	My Little Pony: Twinkle Wish Adventure	Tracey Moore
Flitter Flutter is the Mayor of Ponyville and also the judge for the ornament making contest for the Winter Wishes Festival. She also entrusted Twinkle Wish to Cheerilee, but when she found out she was missing, Whimsey returned it in time for the festival making her and the citizens of Ponyville happy.
Forsythia	Female	Red	Yellow	Yellow Forsythia flowers and a blue butterfly with glitter	2004	Dancing in the Clouds	Kathleen Barr
One of Twinkle Twirl's students, Forsythia is an earth pony who makes hot cocoa and a plate of cookies. She is present at the dance in the Friendship Ball.
Gem Blossom	Female	Yellow	Pink, Orange and Yellow	Gold jewel with pink petals around it forming a flower, surrounded by three smaller pink flowers.	2004	Dancing in the Clouds	Saffron Henderson
Gem Blossom is an earth pony and also one of the Jewel Ponies, released in 2004. Gem Blossom is described on making good jokes and riddles. She likes to put a smile on everyone's faces, though sometimes she laughs so hard when she tells a joke and she needs a friend to help her finish it.
Glitter Glide	Female	Pink	Pink, blue, white and purple	Two Ice skates with Pink Ribbon and Two snowflakes	2004	My Little Pony: The Princess Promenade	Kathleen Barr
Glitter Glide is an earth pony who is first released in 2004 as part of the Ice Dancing with Glitter Glide. She also appeared in My Little Pony: The Princess Promenade as a cameo character.
Heart Bright	Female	White	blue and purple (mane), pink (tail)	A big pink heart with aqua vines trailing down her leg and smaller purple and pink hearts	2007	My Little Pony: A Very Pony Place	Anna Cummer
Heart Bright is one of the two protagonist of Storybelle's story Two for the Sky and seems to be fictional even within the movie. She alongside Star Flight both think alike like twins: playing together, eating sundaes together and wished that they can gain wings so they can fly to the sky. Strangely, she is listed as a Pegasus Pony in her toy incarnation.
Kimono	Female	Pinkish Purple	Dark Purple	Yellow Japanese Lanterns with Flower Designs	2003	A Charming Birthday	Kathleen Barr
Kimono is the keeper of all Pony Legends and Lore. Known to be knowledgeable and wise, she is often sought for advice by the ponies. Although she is born in Ponyville, she prefers to live in the outskirts of town.
Loop-De-La	Female	Light Green	Pink and Purple	Pink ballet slippers and two flowers	2004	Dancing in the Clouds	Kelly Sheridan
Loop-De-La likes to dance Ballet and often is seen with a scooter in Dancing in the Clouds. She is presumed to be one of Twinkle Twirl's students.
Magic Marigold	Female	Pink	White, Orange and Yellow	Three yellow flowers popping out of a purple top hat	2005	Twinkle Wish Adventure	Kelly Sheridan
Magic Marigold appears in "Twinkle Wish Adventure" as background character in which she wears ponytail. She performs a magic shows on all parties.
Merriweather	Female	Yellow	Pink	Light blue umbrella with glitter	2004	Dancing in the Clouds	Anna Cummer
Merriweather loves sunny days. She debuted in Dancing in the Clouds and in Two For The Sky as Star Flight and Heart Bright friend.
Minty	Female	Mint Green	Pink and Light Pink	Three Swirled Mint Candies	2003	A Charming Birthday	Tabitha St. Germain
Minty is described to be a clumsy but airheaded ditz and also a green machine, who likes anything green. She also loves collecting socks, standing on her head, playing checkers with Sweetberry and her favorite holiday is Christmas.
Moondancer	Female	Blue	Yellow	Yellow crescent moon and stars on a blue background	2003	The Princess Promenade	Saffron Henderson
Moondancer is one of Twinkle Twirl's students. She likes trowing moonlight slumber parties, and invite all of her friends.
Mother Pie	Female	Pink	Light Pink	Two Heart-Shaped Balloons	2009	Once Upon a My Little Pony Time	Gigi Abraham
Mother Pie is Pinkie Pie's only mother in the Core 7 side spinoff "Once Upon a My Little Pony Time". She debuted in 2009 alongside the Family Convertible with Newborn Pinkie Pie. She only had a brief appearance in the special, telling Pinkie Pie, Cheerilee and Scootaloo that they can find something to play together.
Peachy Pie	Female	Orange	Pink and white	Peach, a flower and leaves with glitter	2004	My Little Pony: A Very Minty Christmas	Tabitha St. Germain
Peachy Pie is a caring earth pony who likes to give plenty of big warm hugs to her friends.
Piccolo	Female	Blue	Pink	Piccolo, drum and notes	2004	My Little Pony: A Very Minty Christmas	Chiara Zanni
Piccolo is a cheery earth pony who always humming or whistling a lighthearted tune. (sometimes she even whistles while she talks) An eternal optimist, she can see the bright side of any situation.
Pinkie Pie	Female	Pink	Light Pink	Three Balloons Two Blue, One Yellow	2003	A Charming Birthday	Janyse Jaud (A Charming Birthday to Twinkle Wish Adventure); Gigi Abraham (Once Upon a My Little Pony Time, Adult); Dana Flitman (Once Upon a My Little Pony Time, as a baby)
Pinkie Pie is a happy earth pony who loves planning big parties and anything pink (in contrast to Minty's love to green). She was also a natural leader in the Core 7 Serials, who always ready to help her friends and share true friendship with them.
Puzzlemint	Female	White	Yellow, purple, and pink	Purple Magnifying glass looking at yellow puzzle piece	2006	My Little Pony: A Very Pony Place	Kathleen Barr
Puzzlemint is one of the party planners for Pinkie Pie's surprise party. She tries to distract Pinkie Pie to do a scavenger hunt so Minty and her friends can prepare a surprise party for her. Puzzlemint also enjoys solving puzzles.
Rainbow Dash	Female	Light Blue	Pink, Orange, Yellow and Green mane, Blue, Purple and Pink tail	Rainbow Arc with two Clouds	2003	A Charming Birthday	Venus Terzo (A Charming Birthday to A Very Pony Place); Anna Cummer (Meet the Ponies to Twinkle Wish Adventure); Brooke Fennel (Once upon a My Little Pony Time)
Rainbow Dash is an Earth Pony who debuted in 2003. She is described to be a stylish pony who likes rainbows and speaks with a Mid-Atlantic accent. She always adds the word "darling" into her speech. She also has been released many times in the new uniform pose as part of the Core 7. In the Core 7 series, she has curly hair, and her mane was bound in a bun. She is also described to be stylish and always dresses in style. Sometimes a shopaholic, she always adds the word "Dashing" into her speeches.
Razzaroo	Female	Purple	Blue, light pink and white	Turquise and parcel with yellow hearts tied with pink and white ribbons	2003	A Charming Birthday	Jillian Michaels
Razzaroo is Ponyville's resident party planner. She always plans everyone's birthday using her Birthday Book. In the special, she and her friends did a surprise party for Kimono.
Scootaloo	Female	Orange	Purple and Pink	Pink Butterfly with two small yellow flowers	2005	My Little Pony: Meet the Ponies	Tabitha St. Germain (Meet the Ponies to Twinkle Wish Adventure); Rachel Chrystie (Once upon a My Little Pony time)
Scootaloo is a brash but tomboy earth pony who first appeared in Generation 3 series. She later became part of the Core 7 in 2008 along with her sister Cheerilee. She loves playing games and sports but sometimes argue with Cheerilee in some situations. In Twinkle Wish Adventure she wears ponytail.
Scooter Sprite	Female	Pearly Purple	Blue, white and purple	Turquise Scooter	2004 (Animation); 2005 (Toy)	Dancing in the Clouds	Janyse Jaud
Scooter Sprite is an earth pony who is always on the go. She likes to ride with her scooter all across Ponyville and is also found of Roller Skates.
Seaspray	Female	Blue	blue, purple, teal and yellow	Yellow Sea Star with blue bubbles	2005	Dancing in the Clouds	Kelly Sheridan
Seaspray likes sailing and exploring the sea, especially going to Butterfly Island. She had cameo appearances in the Generation 3 Specials, more notable were in Dancing in the Clouds and My Little Pony: Twinkle Wish Adventure.
Sew-and-So	Female	Orange	Light Pink and purple	Pink button surrounded by four aqua hearts outlined in blue	2004	My Little Pony Live: The World's Biggest Tea Party	Kathleen Barr
A pony who loves sewing, Sew-and-so is one of the best dressed ponies in Ponyville. She makes all her own clothes and her closet is filled with sparkly skirts, lacy scarves and pretty knit hats. And of course she loves to make fancy outfits for her friends. She only appeared in My Little Pony Live: The World's Biggest Tea Party as one of the main characters.
Skywishes	Female	Pink	Pink and Purple	Green Kite and an Orange butterfly	2004	Dancing in the Clouds	Saffron Henderson
Skywishes is one of Twinkle Twirl's best friend, who wished to be a ballerina and attend Twinkle Twirl's Dance Studio. She is rather scatterbrained, but usually likes to make special wishes. She met Star Catcher, a Pegasus pony, after she discovered the Rainbow Waterfall and Butterfly Island, and was once the only pony who knew the secret of the Pegasus Ponies. Eventually, she and Star Catcher help the Pegasus Ponies to make friends with the residents of Ponyville.
Sparkleworks	Female	Orange	Pink	Yellow, red, blue and white fireworks	2003	A Charming Birthday	Venus Terzo
Sparkleworks is a Glitzy pony, who appeared in several Generation 3 My Little Pony Specials. Sparkleworks has a big imagination and can make each and every day an adventure. She is also found of glittery stuff and Razaroo explained that she coated Ponyville with glitter during her birthday.
Spring Fever	Female	Pink	Light pink, green and yellow	Group of purple and yellow flowers	2003	A Charming Birthday	Saffron Henderson
Spring Fever likes anything new. She's always the first to try a new recipe, and the first to wear the latest fashions and loves to see new flowers peeking out from under the snow, and hear baby birds singing in their nests, but most of all she loves to make new friends.
Starbeam	Female	Blue	White	Two yellow and white shooting stars above a yellow star with glitter	2004	Dancing in the Clouds	Ellen Kennedy
Starbeam loves to count the stars in the sky, but sometimes falls asleep when doing so. She had a brief appearance in Dancing in the Clouds as an extra character.
Star Flight	Female	Pink	Dark Pink and Blue	big yellow star with a tail of white lines, pink stars, and yellow stars	2007	My Little Pony: A Very Pony Place	Anna Cummer
Star Flight is one of the two protagonist of Storybelle's story Two for the Sky and seems to be fictional even within the movie. She alongside Heart Bright both think alike like twins: playing together, eating sundaes together and wished that they can gain wings so they can fly to the sky. Strangely, she is listed as a Pegasus Pony in her toy incarnation.
Storybelle	Female	Pink	Yellow, Pink, Blue and Purple mane, blue tail	Windmill with a Rainbow and a Book	2007	My Little Pony: A Very Pony Place	Kelly Metzger
Storybelle is a storyteller, who doesn't have without a toy appearance alongside Whimsey the Dragon. She is described to be a good storyteller and seen alongside Gossamer, her assistant. In "Two for the Sky", she tells Minty, Sunny Daze and Pinkie Pie about the story of Star Flight & Heart Bright.
Sunny Daze	Female	White	Yellow, pink, orange and purple	Orange and pink smiling sun surrounded by purple clouds	2003	A Charming Birthday	Adrienne Carter
Sunny Daze is a brave athletic pony, who starred in many of the G3 My Little Pony cartoons and DVDs. She usually loves outdoor activities and things with bright colors.
Sweetberry	Female	Magenta	Purple, green and white	Two strawberries and a white flower	2003	A Charming Birthday	Kathleen Barr
Sweetberry is the owner of the Sweetberry Sweet Shoppe, who starred in many of the G3 My Little Pony cartoons and DVDs. Alongside Cotton Candy, Sweetberry works at the Cotton Candy Cafe likes to help each other out. She also likes to make several sweet treats for her friends. Sweetberry is sometimes busy but very reliable.
Tink-a-Tink-a-Too	Female	Purple	Blue, pink and purple	Two blue bells tied with a pink ribbon	2003	Pinkie Pie and the Ladybug Jamboree	Kelly Sheridan
Tink-a-Tink-a-Too was originally released in 2003 as part of the Rainbow Celebration Ponies assortment. She was released three times in the Donkey pose until in 2006 when she was later released in the Diva Pose. She later appeared in Generation 3 Special Pinkie Pie and the Ladybug Jamboree as part of Pinkie Pie's musical band.
Toola-Roola	Female	Pink (Before the Core 7); Cream (Core 7)	Cyan, white and lavender (Before the Core 7); Yellow, Orange and Dark Pink mane, Blue, Navy Blue and Purple tail (Core 7)	Aqua triskels and three blue flowers (Before the Core 7); Paintbrush and curly lines (Core 7)	2004 (Before the Core 7); 2007 (Core 7)	My Little Pony: Meet the Ponies (Animation Debut)	Erin Mathews
Toola-Roola has been first produced in 2005, in which she loved dressing up, until she again debuted in 2007 along with the other Core 7 members. She is a talented artist who loves to paint pictures and make arts and crafts. She always finds inspirations everywhere, even in the unusual spots. In "Twinkle Wish Adventure", it is revealed that she is afraid of the dark and, thus, would not sleep at night without a nightlight and has straight and short hair.
Triple Treat	Female	Light Purple	Dark pink, blonde, and light pink	Brown Cookie, Pink Lollipop and a yellow Ice Cream Cone with pink Ice Cream	2004	Friends are Never Far Away	Chiara Zanni
Triple Treat is Ponyville's dessert specialist, usually she bakes her own treats. She has a lot of energy and always makes time to stop for dessert. Her favorite treat is Peppermint Ice Cream with chocolate chip cookies and a red lollipop on top. Usually in the special, she suggested Sweetberry and Cotton Candy to do a big ice cream sundae for the pegasus ponies.
Twinkle Twirl	Female	Purple	Light pink, dark pink and orange mane	Orange and pink fireworks	2004	Dancing in the Clouds	Chiara Zanni
Twinkle Twirl is a graceful dancer in Ponyville and the owner the Twinkle Twirl Dance Studio. She choreographs a special dance for the Friendship Ball and knew Skywishes as her friend. She has a lot of students on her studio, but the two most notable were Apple Spice and Bow Tie.
Valenshy	Female	Pink	White, pink and red	Red jewel in centre of pink heart surrounded by white lace	2004	My Little Pony: The Princess Promenade	Tabitha St. Germain
Valenshy is always doing nice things for her friends, but due to her shyness, she never lets them know her feelings.
Waterfire	Female	Blue	Orange	Fire over water	2005	A Charming Birthday	Chiara Zanni
This quiet pony always brings a stack of books to the beach. She doesn't get to read much, because all her friends want her to watch their daring dives.
Wysteria	Female	Purple	Purple, white and pink	Wysteria flowers	2003	A Charming Birthday	Tabitha St. Germain
Wysteria is Ponyville's gardener and Organizer of the Spring Promenade. She is shown to be a good gardener who loves flowers. She is also shy, but she finds a way to fill every activity with laughter and fun. After awakening Spike from his 1000-year sleep, she became the Princess of Ponyville until she decided to be herself in the end.

=== Pegasus Ponies ===
The Pegasi are winged ponies. Most speak with a Hawaiian accent except StarSong and Thistle Whistle.

Name	Gender	Body Color	Hair Color	Cutie Mark	Year of Toy/Animation Debut	Animation Debut	Voiced by
Cloud Climber	Female	White	Purple	3D Pink Butterfly	2005	A Very Minty Christmas	Kathleen Barr
Cloud Climber is one of the pegasus ponies in Butterfly Island and one of Star Catcher's close friends. She likes to soar higher into the sky and can also jump over a rainbow. She is also very skilled in flying.
Coconut Grove	Female	Pink	Dark purple with green streak in mane	Two halves of coconut and three purple flowers on green background	2005	Friends Are Never Far Away	Chiara Zanni
Coconut Grove is one of the pegasus ponies in Butterfly Island and one of Star Catcher's close friends. She is very brave and is much more determined than the other Pegasus Ponies.
Island Delight	Female	Purple	Blue	3D Blue shell with pink heart and five white flowers	2005	Friends Are Never Far Away	Tabitha St. Germain
Island Delight is one of the pegasus ponies in Butterfly Island and one of Star Catcher's close friends. She glides gracefully through the air, wondering what lies just beyond the horizon.
Honolu-loo	Female	White	Pink, orange and yellow	Pink Butterfly and two yellow flowers	2005	Friends Are Never Far Away	Kathleen Barr
Honolu-Loo is a pegasus pony who appeared in Friends Are Never Far Away and met Skywishes.
Star Catcher	Female	White	Blue, white and pink	Pink heart with glitter	2004	Dancing in the Clouds	Lenore Zann
Star Catcher was first released in 2004 as part of the G3 line, and has since been discontinued. She was released again in 2007 as a single decorating pony. Star Catcher is the first Pegasus Pony in the Generation 3 Line and is described in Ponyville Legends to grant everyone's wish. She lives in Butterfly Island, a place where all Pegasus Ponies live and she loves to make friends with everyone she meets, especially to Skywishes.
Starsong	Female	Purple	Various Shades of Pink	Large white and pink star surrounded by other smaller stars	2008	My Little Pony: Meet the Ponies	Chantal Strand (2008–2013), Tara Strong (2013-present)
Starsong is a Pegasus Pony and a member of the Core 7 Ponies. In "Twinkle Wish Adventure" unlike other Pegasus Ponies, Starsong has small, gossamer-like sparkling wings that allow her to fly and short, curly hair. She also loves singing and dancing, although she could come off as shy and is slightly timid about performing on stage. She is brave but sometimes she can't stand up for herself on some situations and is a bit too fearful, which leads to her friends to encourage her. Starsong is only pegasus, who lives in Ponyville.
Thistle Whistle	Female	Baby Blue	Red with Yellow streak in mane	Purple Thistle flowers and a butterfly	2005	Friends are Never Far Away	Tabitha St. Germain
Thistle Whistle is a pegasus pony who was first released in 2005 as a Sunny Scent Pony, scented like coconut and again re-released in 2007 alongside Sing and Dance Pinkie Pie and Sew-and-So. She later debuted in the third Generation 3 special Friends are Never Far Away. Like her namesake, Thistle Whistle always whistles in one of her speeches.

=== Unicorn Ponies ===
Name	Gender	Body Color	Hair Color	Cutie Mark	Year of Toy/Animation Debut	Animation Debut	Voiced by
Brights Brightly	Female	Yellow	Orange and Pink	Rising sun over stylized water and three pink hearts fly over the sun	2006	My Little Pony Crystal Princess: The Runaway Rainbow	Maryke Hendrikse
Brights Brightly is one of Cheerilee's friends, who alongside Whistle Wishes and Rarity, in charge on bringing in the first rainbow of the season until Rarity disappeared. She likes racing around the mountains in the carriage.
Lily Lightly	Female	Purple	Light pink, pink and purple	Pink lily flower on a blue stem with little stars below	2006	My Little Pony: A Very Pony Place	Erin Mathews
Lily Lightly debuted in 2006 as a special pony with a light-up horn and a pretty pink gown and then debuted again in My Little Pony: A Very Pony Place. Dubbed as the "Princess of All that Twinkles and Glows", Lily Lightly has a special horn which lights up when she is sad or happy. Though Lily finds her ability strange, her friends view it as part of her uniqueness.
Rarity	Female	Pink	Dark Pink, Orange and Yellow mane, Green, Blue and Purple tail	Heart with multiple-colored swirls surrounding	2006	My Little Pony Crystal Princess: The Runaway Rainbow	Cathy Weseluck
Rarity is a young unicorn pony who usually values fun rather than her initial duty as a Crystal Rainbow Princess. She is in charge of the magic wand and alongside Brights Brightly, Cheerilee and Whistle Wishes, were also in charge on bringing in the First Rainbow of The Season. Her wand allows her to control the colors to bring in the first rainbow of the season and lets her summon the Crystal Carriage. Unlike toy, which is adult pony, animated Rarity is a baby unicorn.
Sweetie Belle	Female	White	Purple and Light Purple with a Pink Streak in mane	Sparkly Pink Heart	2008	My Little Pony: Meet the Ponies	Andrea Libman
Sweetie Belle is a Unicorn Pony and a member of the Core 7 ponies. Usually the youngest of the group, she hails from Unicornia, before being teleported to Ponyville when she was a baby. She has a big heart and likes to bake sweets for her friends. She also can demonstrate magic, however, this was only shown in "Once Upon a My Little Pony Time", where she used it to fix Rainbow Dash's scarf. Sweetie Belle is only unicorn, who lives in Ponyville. In "Twinkle Wish Adventure" she has short and curly hair.
Whistle Wishes	Female	Light Blue	Pink, yellow and green mane, Pink and Orange tail	Rainbow stars and a cloud	2006	My Little Pony Crystal Princess: The Runaway Rainbow	Brittney Wilson
Whistle Wishes is one of Cheerilee's friends, who alongside Brights Brightly and Rarity, in charge on bringing in the first rainbow of the season until Rarity disappeared. She likes going for a moonlight ride in the carriage.

== Related types ==
=== Breezies ===
The Breezies are small fairy ponies living in Breezy Blossom. These ponies usually have butterfly-like wings and antennae on their heads. Notable ones in the franchise were Tiddly Wink, Tra La La and Zipzee.

Name	Gender	Body Color	Hair Color	Cutie Mark	Year of Toy/Animation Debut	Animation Debut	Voiced by
Tiddly Wink	Female	Light Purple	Purple with a Light Purple Streak	Pink Flower and green stem	2006	My Little Pony: The Princess Promenade	Chantal Strand
Tiddly Wink is usually supportive towards the ponies and the other Breezies. Usually, she and her friends agree with each other to lead the way.
Tra La La	Female	Lavender	Pink with dark pink steak in mane	Pink Flower	2006	My Little Pony: The Princess Promenade	Britt McKillip
Tra La La is usually supportive towards the ponies and the other Breezies. Usually, she and her friends agree with each other to lead the way.
Zipzee	Female	Yellow	Orange with a yellow streak	Two flowers: Orange one and White one	2006	My Little Pony: The Princess Promenade	Andrea Libman
Zipzee is usually supportive towards the ponies and the other Breezies. Usually, she and her friends agree with each other to lead the way. Zipzee also has Allergic rhinitis and she usually sneezes a lot when she is near the flowers despite being born in Breezy Blossom.

== Other characters ==
- Spike—full name, Kenbroath Gilspotten Heathspike—is a small blue dragon with gold-colored ear flaps and underbelly scales, a "mohawk" of pink hair, yellow claws, and short yellow spikes on his tail (which is very ticklish). He is the only male character in the G3 cartoons. First appearing in My Little Pony: The Princess Promenade, he had been in a magic sleep for a thousand years when the ponies first discovered him in a cave under Celebration Castle; his memories from before that time are rather muddled. Spike is friendly and knowledgeable, speaks in a clear and cultured voice, and is seen by the ponies as a source of information and advice.
