= My Little Pony (2003 toyline) =

Line of toys

- Logo from the "Generation 3.5" era (used until mid-2010, but still used in some countries as of 2011)
- Original work: Toys
- Years: 2003–2009

Films and television
- Direct-to-video: Animated films and shorts; Once Upon a My Little Pony Time

Theatrical presentations
- Musical: My Little Pony Live: The World's Biggest Tea Party (2006—2008)

Games
- Video games: My Little Pony Crystal Princess: The Runaway Rainbow (2006); My Little Pony: Pinkie Pie's Party (2008)

Miscellaneous
- Toy: My Little Pony

American toy company Hasbro launched the third incarnation of My Little Pony toyline and media franchise in 2003. The revamped line of dolls targeted a younger audience than previous lines. This incarnation is unofficially known among collectors as "Generation Three" or "G3". Until the generation's end in 2009, there have been at least two minor revamps. A series of direct-to-video animated films (mostly produced by SD Entertainment) accompanied the line-up. My Little Pony: Meet the Ponies, for example, was a 2008 collection of animated shorts commemorating the 25th anniversary of the franchise and introduced the "Core 7" ponies.

== Toys ==
My Little Pony
- Company: Hasbro
- Country: United States
- Availability: 2003–2009

"Generation Three" is set in the fictional town of Ponyville, which is centered on Celebration Castle. Only Earth Ponies were released from 2003 to 2005, but in 2005 and 2006 Pegasus Ponies and Unicorn Ponies were respectively introduced.

Until late 2005, packaging came with Pony Points that were later used for exclusive mail orders. Unlike the "G1" line, the Pony Points had to be mailed in to order; a customer could not pay a flat fee and add points to it to lower the price. Some of the ponies available with the Pony Points program were Dazzle Surprise, Sunshimmer and Love Wishes. Other merchandise included posters or a play mat to put buildings on. The points program ended on 31 January 2006.

While the line was simultaneously released in the U.S. and Europe, there are a few ponies unavailable in the U.S., such as Winter Snow and some small, fairy-like ponies called Breezies who first appeared in the animated feature The Princess Promenade. One of the most uncommon ponies in this third line was released by mistake in 2004. A Pinkie Pie with the words "2003 Licensing Show" embedded into her symbol was used to promote the My Little Pony toy line at the 2003 Spring Licensing Show, and were intended to be released only at that show in a limited edition of 300. Due to a packaging error, a few were packaged as regular ponies and sold in stores. Other limited-edition ponies have been the Pony Project promotional ponies and Rosey Posey, who was given to attendees at a charity dinner held by Hasbro.

Ponyville figurines

The Ponyville figurines are fully molded plastic and smaller than the main "G3" line. Although they have their own playsets and accessories, many of the characters are the same as their larger counterparts.

2008 and 2009 revamps

In 2008, the number of characters were reduced to seven: Pinkie Pie, Scootaloo, Toola-Roola, Rainbow Dash, Sweetie Belle, Cheerilee and Starsong; thus collectors referring the revamp as "Core 7". The following year in 2009, in a move referred by collectors as "Generation 3.5", Hasbro redesigned the characters to resemble Ponyville figurines.

Collector's edition after 2010

Recognizing the older fans of its line, Hasbro has released special collector ponies noticeably different from the regular "G3". While some had a general release as "Art Ponies", many are available through special events, such as the annual My Little Pony Collector's Convention and San Diego Comic-Con. These ponies are elaborately designed, such as the underwater-themed art pony which has fish and sea creatures printed all over its body, and come in matching display boxes. The 2011 SDCC pony is black and pink and has a kawaii skull instead of a "cutie mark". There is also a white pony available to customizers. Another is a pink pony with a breast cancer awareness ribbon. Despite the redesign as "G3.5" and the advent of the "G4" line, Hasbro continued the collector-themed "G3" ponies in their original poses.

== Media ==
=== Direct-to-video animated features ===
Between 2003 and 2009, the ponies appeared in a series of direct-to-video shorts and feature-length films. Most of them were produced by SD Entertainment. These are set in yet another milieu, and feature the "G3" ponies:

| Title | Directed by | Written by | Original release date |
|---|---|---|---|
Early releases
| A Charming Birthday | Paul Sabella & Dan Kuenster | Jeanne Romano | 2003 |
A direct to video release, it was not sold on its own but packaged with some of the early "G3" characters.
| Dancing in the Clouds | Davis Doi | Jeanne Romano | 2004 |
This was a VHS included with the first Pegasus pony of the "G3" line, Star Catcher.
| Friends Are Never Far Away | John Grusd | Bonnie Solomon | 2005 |
A DVD that packaged with a new Pegasus Pony, Hidden Treasure.
| My Little Pony: A Very Minty Christmas | Vic Dal Chele | Jeanne Romano | October 25, 2005 |
The first video sold by itself, available in both VHS and DVD. It included Dancing in the Clouds as a bonus episode. Re-released in October 2008 with a bonus Ponyville Minty figurine.
| My Little Pony: The Princess Promenade | Vic Dal Chele | Jeanne Romano | February 7, 2006 |
Featured the debut of the "G3" incarnation of Spike the Dragon. It also included Breezies, small, fairy-like ponies. It was available on VHS and DVD, and included A Charming Birthday as a bonus episode.
| My Little Pony Crystal Princess: The Runaway Rainbow | Vic Dal Chele & Davis Doi | Jeanne Romano & Bonnie Solomon | September 12, 2006 |
Featured the new "G3" unicorn, Rarity. Only released on DVD (promotional copies are available on VHS), it included "Friends Are Never Far Away" as a bonus episode.
| My Little Pony: A Very Pony Place | John Grusd | Jeanne Romano & Bonnie Solomon | February 6, 2007 |
Three New Pony Tales including "Come Back, Lily Lightly", "Two For the Sky" and "Positively Pink". Each story features Lily Lightly, Storybelle and Puzzlemint.
2008 revamp
| My Little Pony: Pinkie Pie's Special Day | John Grusd | Jeanne Romano & Bonnie Solomon | 2008 |
Packaged in a set of the same name, with Pinkie Pie in an outfit resembling the one worn in the episode.
| My Little Pony: Meet the Ponies | John Grusd | N/A | 2008 |
A DVD containing several mini-episodes featuring the "core seven" ponies which were first available online. Packaged with the first wave of the "core seven" pony toys.
| My Little Pony: Starsong and the Magic Dance Shoes | John Grusd | Jeanne Romano & Bonnie Solomon | 2008 |
Packaged in a set of the same name, with Starsong in an outfit resembling the one worn in the episode.
| My Little Pony: Rainbow Dash's Special Day | John Grusd | Jeanne Romano & Bonnie Solomon | 2009 |
Packaged in a set of the same name, with Rainbow Dash in an outfit resembling the one worn in the episode.
2009 revamp
| My Little Pony: Twinkle Wish Adventure | John Grusd | Sherri Stoner | October 13, 2009 |
Released by Shout! Factory and Hasbro, this DVD includes a feature-length movie, sing-a-longs and other bonus material.

=== Once Upon a My Little Pony Time ===
Once Upon a My Little Pony Time was produced by Kunoichi, animated in Adobe Flash. It included two 10-minute episodes. It features the "Core 7" characters as Newborn Cuties, but Starsong and Toola-Roola are not seen in either videos.

| No. | Title | Written and directed by | Storyboard by | Original release date |
|---|---|---|---|---|
| 1 | "Over Two Rainbows" | Written by : Jeanne Romano & Bonnie Solomon; Directed by : John Grusd | Joel Seibel | 2009 |
| 2 | "So Many Different Ways to Play" | James Farr | Jose Garibaldi | 2009 |

=== My Little Pony Live: The World's Biggest Tea Party (2006) ===
My Little Pony Live: The World's Biggest Tea Party is a 90-minute musical produced by Hasbro and VEE Corporation, first announced on June 19, 2006, and stars Pinkie Pie, Minty, Sweetberry, Sew-and-so, Rarity, Rainbow Dash, Spike, Thistle Whistle, Zipzee, Tra La La, Tiddlywink and Wysteria. The show opened later in October 2006 and was released on DVD on September 16, 2008.

=== Interactive software ===
==== My Little Pony Crystal Princess: The Runaway Rainbow (2006) ====
My Little Pony Crystal Princess: The Runaway Rainbow
- Developer: Webfoot Technologies
- Publisher: THQ
- Platform: Game Boy Advance
- Release: NA: September 13, 2006
- Genre: Adventure/Puzzle
- Mode: Single-player

My Little Pony Crystal Princess: The Runaway Rainbow is an adventure/puzzle video game developed by Webfoot Technologies and published by THQ under license from Hasbro. It was released for Game Boy Advance on September 13, 2006, in North America. The game recreates events from the film of the same title, featuring mini-games and puzzles.

==== My Little Pony: Pinkie Pie's Party (2008) ====
My Little Pony: Pinkie Pie's Party is an adventure/puzzle video game developed by Webfoot Technologies and published by THQ under license from Hasbro. The game was released for Nintendo DS on September 22, 2008. Similar to "Crystal Princess: The Runaway Rainbow", the game also features puzzles and mini-games utilizing the Nintendo DS's capabilities.

== Other merchandises ==
The tie-in merchandise has been released for the third generation. The characters can be found on bedding and home decor, clothing, dishware, stationery and school supplies. Plush ponies have been given away as theme-park prizes and used in crane machines. There is a 3-foot (0.91 m) plush-pony line which was first available for sale in Australia; the characters include Rainbow Dash, Minty, Sweetberry, and the special Kimono, which was used as a prize by Red Rooster restaurants and Target. McDonald's has also featured ponies in its Happy Meal promotions, as have other fast food chains. Eight characters were used in the first U.S. McDonald's promotion, while other countries' chain restaurants had four.
