= My Little Pony: Twinkle Wish Adventure =

2009 animated film

- Directed by: John Grusd
- Written by: Sherri Stoner
- Based on: My Little Pony by Bonnie Zacherle
- Produced by: Robert Winthrop
- Starring: Janyse Jaud; Anna Cummer; Chantal Strand; Andrea Libman; Tabitha St. Germain; Kelly Sheridan; Erin Mathews; Tracey Moore; Keegan Connor Tracy
- Narrated by: Tracey Moore
- Music by: Mark Watters
- Production companies: SD Entertainment; Hasbro Entertainment
- Distributed by: Shout Factory; Kidtoon Films (theatrical release)
- Release dates: October 13, 2009 (DVD release); November 7, 2009 (Limited theatrical release)
- Running time: 44 minutes
- Countries: United States; Canada
- Language: English

My Little Pony: Twinkle Wish Adventure is a 2009 animated fantasy adventure film produced by SD Entertainment and distributed by Shout! Factory in collaboration with Hasbro. The film was released on October 13, 2009, in promoting the Core 7 toy line and is the final film released during the third incarnation of the My Little Pony franchise before Hasbro moved on to My Little Pony: Friendship Is Magic in 2010.

Alongside Crystal Princess: The Runaway Rainbow and The Princess Promenade, the film premiered on August 8, 2014, on the Hub Network after its "My Little Pony Mega Mare-athon". According to Broadway World, the "Mega Mare-athon" itself drew in 5.4 million viewers and has earned significant delivery growth on every demographic: Kids 2-11 (+134%), Girls 2-11 (+179%), Kids 6-11 (+169%), Girls 6-11 (+216%), Adults 18-49 (+111%), Women 18-49 (+146%), Adults 25-54 (+74%), Women 25-54 (+76%), Persons 2+ (+124%) and Households (+98%).

== Plot summary ==
The Winter Wishes Festival is finally coming and all of the ponies in Ponyville are excited to see Twinkle Wish, a wishing star who grants each pony one special wish. However, after Twinkle Wish gets kidnapped by a dragon named Whimsey Weatherbe, the entire event is facing a big dilemma and it's up to Pinkie Pie and her friends to get her back before the night of the festival. Otherwise, everyone's wishes won't be granted, and the festival would be ruined.

At the end of the film, it turns out that Whimsey simply wanted Twinkle Wish as a companion to play with, rather than intending any harm on her. After Pinkie and her friends fail to convince Whimsey to give her back, the dragon has a change of heart and gives Twinkle Wish back to them, just in time for the festival. Everyone's wishes are granted in the process and the festival gets to happen after all, to everybody's happiness.

== Songs ==
- My Little Pony Theme Song
- Somewhere Super New
- That's What Makes a Friend
- Dreams Do Come True

== Characters ==
=== Main characters ===
Pinkie Pie
Voiced by: Janyse Jaud
An earth pony with a hot pink body and a light hot pink mane & tail. Her cutie mark is three balloons (two blue ones and one yellow one). Pinkie Pie is the imaginative, friendly, fun-loving leader of the group who loves planning big parties and anything pink.

Rainbow Dash
Voiced by: Anna Cummer
An earth pony with a sky blue body and a multicolored mane and tail, stylized in topknot. She has a rainbow on the clouds as her cutie mark. She is the stylish, trendy, shopaholic fashionista of the group who is described as the one who'd "always dresses in style". She is the oldest of the group.

Starsong
Voiced by: Chantal Strand
A pegasus pony with a violet body and curly mane and tail in hot pink and light hot pink. She also has gossamer-like wings on her back. Her cutie mark is a pink and white star. She is an expert performer, singer and dancer who is a bit shy at times, but blossoms on stage. Only pegasus in Ponyville. She's the 3rd Youngest of the Group.

Sweetie Belle
Voiced by: Andrea Libman
A unicorn pony with a white body whose mane & tail are colored bright pink, violet and mauve. Her cutie mark is a sparkly pink heart. She is the youngest, but sweet and kind, member of the group who loves baking sweets and treats. She is Scootaloo's best friend. Only unicorn in Ponyville.

Scootaloo
Voiced by: Tabitha St. Germain
An earth pony with an tangerine body and a violet and bright pink mane & tail, also wears ponytail. Her cutie mark is a butterfly with two small yellow flowers. The second youngest of the group, Scootaloo is Cheerilee's younger sister who loves playing games and sports. She can be a bit stubborn and would sometimes argue with Cheerilee in some points. She is Sweetie Belle's best friend.

Cheerilee
Voiced by: Kelly Sheridan
An earth pony with a red-violet body and a mane & tail in light hot pink, hot pink, and violet, stylized in pigtails. Her cutie mark is a light pink lily. She loves flowers and telling amazing stories. She is also Scootaloo's older sister who acts maturely and knows what's best for her, but sometimes argues with her in some points. She's also the 3rd oldest of the Group.

Toola-Roola
Voiced by: Erin Mathews
An earth pony with a light hot pink colored body and short, straight, hot pink, tangerine and sunshine yellow mane in bob-like hairstyle and sky blue, indigo and violet tail. Her cutie mark is a paintbrush and curly lines. The second oldest of the group, Toola-Roola is a talented artist who enjoys painting pictures and making arts and crafts. She also loves finding inspirations everywhere, even in the unusual spots.

=== Recurring characters ===
Flitter Flutter
Voiced by: Tracey Moore
An Earth pony with a sunshine yellow body and a violet and light hot pink mane and tail. Her cutie mark is a heart key with a ribbon in it. She is the Mayor of Ponyville and also the judge for the ornament making contest for the Winter Wishes Festival. She also entrusted Twinkle Wish to Cheerilee until the night of the Winter Wishes Festival.

Twinkle Wish
Voiced by: Tabitha St. Germain
Twinkle Wish is a wishing star, described in the legends of the Winter Wishes Festival. She usually sleeps inside a box to get enough energy for the festival so she can grant everyone's wishes. She was "kidnapped" by Whimsey, leaving the ponies to get her back before the night of the festival.

Whimsey Weatherbe
Voiced by: Keegan Connor Tracy
A female dragon with an tangerine body, sunshine yellow scales, bronze hair, a pair of mauve wings and wears a sky blue ribbon on her head, She lives in Willy Nelly Mountain at the outskirts of Ponyville and is shown to manipulate the weather and likes to have friends. She "Kidnaps" Twinkle Wish, the wishing star in Ponyville after Scootaloo accidentally opens its box, leading to the ponies to go to Willy Nelly Mountain to retrieve it from her. After the ponies failed to convince her, she decides to give it back with a changed heart at the night of the Festival.

== Waiting for the Winter Wishes Festival ==
The DVD includes a short prologue story titled Waiting for the Winter Wishes Festival, which is set before the official story. In the prologue, the ponies described what they liked about the Winter Wishes Festival. The DVD also comes with an Elefun and Friends short.

== Reception ==
The special received mixed reviews from critics, with Internet Movie Database giving it the score of 5/10. Kurt Dahlke of DVDtalk states that "If your preschool-aged girl loves My Little Pony stuff, she'll love this just-average cartoon DVD. The story's cute, the songs are cute, and it's all cute. Plenty of extras render average slightly above average, and if you're a sicko like me, you might really appreciate all the bright colors. You'll know what your kid likes, but in the grand scheme of things this pretty good DVD of a so-so program merits a Rent It." Blog Critics editor Jennifer Bogart had a bit of positive thoughts on the film saying "Something I’ve discovered is that you can't go back in time – in all honesty I found the film a bit inane – my children love it though." and also states that "This is one to pop in and head while you tackle some overdue chores, it's not at all appealing to adults (no matter how much we loved My Little Pony as kids), but it's a fun, light-hearted movie for the little ones".

== See also ==
- List of films about horses
