= List of most watched United States television broadcasts of 1996 =

Most watched American broadcasts of the year 1996

The following is a list of most watched United States television broadcasts of 1996.

== Most watched by week ==
Broadcast (primetime only)
Week of	Title	Network	Viewers (in millions)	Ref.
January 1	ER	NBC	37.6	
January 8	Seinfeld	NBC	31.9	
January 15	Friends	NBC	31.6	
January 22	Super Bowl XXX	NBC	94.1	
January 29	Seinfeld	NBC	37.1	
February 5	ER	NBC	38.1	
February 12	ER	NBC	36.4	
February 19	ER	NBC	36.0	
February 26	Seinfeld	NBC	31.5	
March 4	Seinfeld	NBC	32.7	
March 11	Seinfeld	NBC	29.2	
March 18	Friends	NBC	30.1	
March 25	68th Academy Awards	ABC	44.9	
April 1	Home Improvement	ABC	38.0	
April 8	Seinfeld	NBC	25.4	
April 15	Seinfeld	NBC	26.1	
April 22	ER	NBC	32.2	
April 29	ER	NBC	34.3	
May 6	ER	NBC	32.0	
May 13	ER	NBC	34.3	
May 20	Home Improvement	ABC	22.7	
May 27	Home Improvement	ABC	22.6	
June 3	NBA Finals (Game 1)	NBC	23.9	
June 10	Unknown			
June 17	Seinfeld	NBC	20.4	
June 24	Seinfeld	NBC	20.2	
July 1	20/20	ABC	15.6	
July 8	Seinfeld	NBC	20.1	
July 15	1996 Summer Olympics opening ceremony	NBC	39.8	
July 22	1996 Summer Olympics (Thurs)	NBC	42.7	
July 29	1996 Summer Olympics (Mon)	NBC	40.2	
August 5	Seinfeld	NBC	19.9	
August 12	Seinfeld	NBC	19.3	
August 19	Seinfeld	NBC	22.0	
August 26	Seinfeld	NBC	17.7	
September 2	Monday Night Football	ABC	27.7	
September 9	Seinfeld	NBC	22.6	
1996–97 television season begins
September 16	Seinfeld	NBC	33.7	
September 23	ER	NBC	34.9	
September 30	Seinfeld	NBC	31.6	
October 7	Seinfeld	NBC	32.2	
October 14	ER	NBC	32.9	
October 21	World Series (Game 6)	Fox	30.4	
October 28	ER	NBC	31.1	
November 4	ER	NBC	36.7	
November 11	ER	NBC	37.4	
November 18	ER	NBC	37.0	
November 25	Home Improvement	ABC	25.3	
December 2	Seinfeld	NBC	25.3	
December 9	ER	NBC	32.9	
December 16	Unknown			
December 23	Seinfeld	NBC	22.4	
December 30	Panthers vs. Cowboys (NFL)	Fox	26.6	
