= Rosaceous =

Rosaceous may refer to:

- The plant family Rosaceae
- The skin condition rosacea
- Rose (color)
