= Mark Watters =

American music composer (born 1955)

- Born: May 25, 1955 (age 71); Irving, Texas, U.S.
- Genre: Film scores
- Occupations: Composer; Conductor; Music director
- Instrument: Saxophone
- Years active: 1990–2015

Mark Watters (born May 25, 1955) is an American composer of music for film and television.

== Biography ==
Watters is a six-time Emmy award-winning composer, conductor and arranger. He was born in Irving, Texas and majored in Saxophone at the University of Southern California where he was a member of Tau Kappa Epsilon fraternity. Mark served as the music director of the 1996 Summer Olympics, and the 2002 Winter Olympics. Watters has served as guest conductor for ensembles such as The Los Angeles Philharmonic, The London Symphony, The Detroit Symphony, The Dallas Symphony, and The Atlanta Symphony. In 2009, he co-conducted a nationwide tour of Star Wars: In Concert with Dirk Brosse. In August 2012, he conducted the Japanese tour featuring The Tokyo Symphony.

He is a former president of the Society of Composers & Lyricists and a former member of the ATAS Board of Governors.

== Discography ==
=== Film ===
- Petal to the Metal - Disney
- The Pebble and the Penguin - MGM - First score for a theatrically released animated film
- All Dogs Go to Heaven 2 - MGM
- Doug's 1st Movie - Disney
- Get a Horse! - Disney
- Poor Papa - Disney
- Africa Before Dark - Disney
- Hungry Hobos - Disney

=== Direct-to-video ===
- Tiny Toon Adventures: How I Spent My Vacation - Warner Bros. (co-composed with Steven Bramson, Bruce Broughton, Don Davis, Albert Lloyd Olson, Richard Stone, and Stephen James Taylor)
- The Return of Jafar - Disney
- Aladdin and the King of Thieves - Disney
- Babes in Toyland - MGM
- An All Dogs Christmas Carol - MGM
- Alvin and the Chipmunks Meet Frankenstein - Universal
- Tom Sawyer - MGM / MCA Records
- Alvin and the Chipmunks Meet the Wolfman - Universal
- Winnie the Pooh: A Very Merry Pooh Year - Disney
- Winnie the Pooh: Springtime with Roo - Disney
- My Little Pony: A Charming Birthday - Paramount / Hasbro / SD Entertainment
- The Cat That Looked at a King - Disney
- My Little Pony: Dancing in the Clouds - Paramount / Hasbro / SD Entertainment
- Candy Land: The Great Lollipop Adventure (songs only) - Paramount / Hasbro / SD Entertainment
- Dinotopia: Quest for the Ruby Sunstone - Hallmark
- My Little Pony: Friends are Never Far Away - Paramount / Hasbro / SD Entertainment
- Pooh's Heffalump Halloween Movie - Disney
- My Little Pony: A Very Minty Christmas - Paramount / Hasbro / SD Entertainment
- Kronk's New Groove - Disney
- My Little Pony: The Princess Promenade - Paramount / Hasbro / SD Entertainment
- Winnie the Pooh: Shapes and Sizes - Disney
- Winnie the Pooh: Wonderful Word Adventure - Disney
- Tom and Jerry: Shiver Me Whiskers - Warner Bros.
- My Little Pony Crystal Princess: The Runaway Rainbow - Paramount / Hasbro / SD Entertainment
- My Little Pony: A Very Pony Place - Paramount / Hasbro / SD Entertainment
- Timon and Pumbaa's Wild About Safety - Disney
- My Little Pony: Twinkle Wish Adventure - Shout! Factory / Hasbro / SD Entertainment
- Once Upon a My Little Pony Time: So Many Ways to Play (theme music) (uncredited) - Hasbro
- The Further Adventures of Thunderbolt - Disney

=== Television ===
- Medal of Honor
- In a Child's Name - CBS
- Tiny Toon Adventures - Warner Bros.
- The Plucky Duck Show - Warner Bros.
- Raw Toonage - Disney
- Darkwing Duck - Disney
- Goof Troop - Disney
- Marsupilami - Disney
- Taz-Mania - Warner Bros.
- Bonkers - Disney
- The Little Mermaid - Disney
- Aladdin - Disney
- The Bug Hunt - Disney
- 1996 Summer Olympics (opening and closing ceremonies)
- All Dogs Go to Heaven: The Series - MGM
- Boo to You Too! Winnie the Pooh - Disney
- The Pink Panther - MGM
- 101 Dalmatians - Disney
- The Lionhearts - MGM
- Hercules - Disney
- New True Life Adventures: Alaska: Dances of the Caribou - Disney
- New True Life Adventures: Elephant Journey - Disney
- New True Life Adventures: Sea of Sharks - Disney
- New True Life Adventures: Everglades: Land of the Living Dinosaur - Disney
- 2002 Winter Olympics (opening and closing ceremonies)
- The 74th Academy Awards (co-composed with John Williams) - ABC
- It's a Very Merry Muppet Christmas Movie - NBC
- Single Santa Seeks Mrs. Claus - Hallmark
- The Long Shot - Hallmark
- Meet the Santas - Hallmark
- Movies Rock (theme music) - CBS
- Have a Laugh! - Disney
- Cars Toons - Disney
- Composers on Composing
- Merrie Melodies - Warner Bros.
- Paradise - CBS
- Noddy - PBS

=== Video games ===
- Disney Princess: Enchanted Journey - Disney Interactive Studios
- Disney Fairies: Tinker Bell - Disney Interactive
- Coraline - D3 Publisher
- Ben 10 Alien Force: Vilgax Attacks - D3 Publisher
- Toy Story 3 - Disney Interactive Studios / Disney Mobile Studios
- Ben 10 Ultimate Alien: Cosmic Destruction - D3 Publisher
- Disney Princess: My Fairytale Adventure - Disney Interactive Studios
- Cars Mania - Disney Interactive

=== Theater ===
- Babes in Toyland - California Music Theater / Orange County Center for the Performing Arts
- 101 Dalmatians (stage musical) - The Arvada Center, Denver, Colorado
- An Adventure of Robinson Crusoe (stage musical) - The Arvada Center, Denver, Colorado
- The Raft of the Medusa - The Incline Theater Group, Santa Monica, California
- Snitch - The Fountain Theatre, Los Angeles, California
- Hamlet - Globe Playhouse, West Hollywood, California

=== Recordings, miscellaneous ===
- "Thinkin' About You" by Trisha Yearwood
- 2001 Seville Film Music Festival
- "Because It's Christmas" by Barry Manilow - Arista Records
- My Little Pony Live: The World's Biggest Tea Party (co-composed with Jon Baker) - VEE Corporation

== Awards and nominations ==
=== Awards ===
- 2008 Primetime Emmy Award - Outstanding Music Direction (Movies Rock)
- 2002 Primetime Emmy Award - Outstanding Music Direction (Opening Ceremony Salt Lake 2002 Olympic Winter Games)
- 2001 News & Documentary Emmy Award - Outstanding Music (New True Life Adventures: Alaska: Dances Of The Caribou)
- 1997 Primetime Emmy Award - Outstanding Music Direction (Opening Ceremonies: Centennial Olympic Games)
- 1995 Daytime Emmy Award - Outstanding Music Direction and Composition - (Aladdin: Season 1)
- 1992 Daytime Emmy Award - Outstanding Music Direction and Composition - (Tiny Toon Adventures - "The Love Disconnection")

=== Nominations ===
- 2000 Daytime Emmy Award - Outstanding Original Song - "Why Not Be Happy" - (All Dogs Go to Heaven: The Series)
- 1999 Daytime Emmy Award - Outstanding Music Direction and Composition, and Outstanding Original Song - "Roar" - (The Lionhearts)
- 1997 Primetime Emmy Award - Outstanding Original Song (Opening Ceremonies: Centennial Olympic Games)
- 1997 Daytime Emmy Award - Outstanding Original Song - (All Dogs Go to Heaven: The Series)
- 1994 Daytime Emmy Award - Outstanding Music Direction and Composition - (The Little Mermaid)
- 1993 Daytime Emmy Award - Outstanding Music Direction and Composition - (Goof Troop - "Goof Troop Christmas: Have Yourself a Goofy Little Christmas")
- 1993 Daytime Emmy Award - Outstanding Music Direction and Composition - (Raw Toonage)
