= My Little Pony: A Very Minty Christmas =

2005 animated film

- DVD Cover for My Little Pony: A Very Minty Christmas
- Directed by: Vic Dal Chele
- Written by: Jeanne Romano
- Based on: My Little Pony by Bonnie Zacherle
- Produced by: Robert Wintrop
- Starring: Tabitha St. Germain; Janyse Jaud; Venus Terzo; Lenore Zann
- Edited by: Derek Iversen
- Music by: Mark Watters
- Production companies: SD Entertainment; Hasbro Entertainment
- Distributed by: Paramount Home Entertainment
- Release date: October 25, 2005
- Running time: 66 min. (Feature: 44 min.)
- Countries: United States; Canada
- Language: English

My Little Pony: A Very Minty Christmas is a 2005 animated Christmas film produced by SD Entertainment, and released on October 25, 2005 by Paramount Home Entertainment. It marks the first film appearance of the titular toy franchise since their big-screen debut in 1986. The DVD includes a bonus episode, Dancing in the Clouds, which is first released on video bundled with Star Catcher in 2004.

A Very Minty Christmas was made available on hubworld.com (a successor of Hasbro's MonkeyBarTV website), alongside My Little Pony: The Princess Promenade and My Little Pony Crystal Princess: The Runaway Rainbow but were later removed from the site.

The popularity of Friendship Is Magic has increased demand for reissues of the original My Little Pony titles. Shout! Factory has now begun to produce DVD reissues of some of these titles, including A Very Minty Christmas.

The film made its television debut on Playhouse Disney's Movie Time Monday on December 25, 2006, and on Toon Disney's Big Movie Show on December 29. It premiered on Discovery Family on December 13, 2014.

== Plot ==
In Ponyville, ponies are making preparations for Christmas. In particular, Sweetberry and Triple Treat are making the "Here Comes Christmas Candy Cane," a candy cane to be affixed on top of the Christmas Tree and lead Santa Claus to Ponyville per local tradition. However, Minty accidentally breaks the candy cane when trying to adjust its position on the tree.

To try to make up for this mistake, Minty takes on the duty of delivering presents on Christmas Eve herself in Santa's place. She decides on giving each pony one of her socks above their fireplace. Pinkie Pie catches Minty when delivering to her home, at which point Minty reveals what happened to the candy cane. Pinkie's dismay at this revelation dissuades Minty of her original plan. Instead, Pinkie proposes that Minty travel to the North Pole to set things right.

Minty leaves to board a hot air balloon when she is confronted by Thistle Whistle. After hearing Minty's plan, Thistle tries to talk her out of it. As Minty leaves in spite of her warning, Pinkie arrives warning that Minty should not travel alone and asks Thistle to catch up with her. As she leaves, Minty knocks over Ponyville's Christmas tree and wakes up the town. Pinkie reveals what has happened calls on the ponies to chase down their friends. Thistle manages to catch up with Minty and redirects her back to Ponyville before their balloon is blown into a sharp branch at the edge of a cliff. The two of them are suspended from this branch when their friends arrive in a convoy of balloons. The ponies land in the North Pole but find that Santa already left to deliver gifts.

After embracing one another, the ponies set out for Ponyville. When they return, the tree is once again standing with a new candy cane mounted on top. The tree is also adorned with the socks Minty gave to her friend, each stuffed with gifts from Santa. The ponies realize that their compassion for one another was sufficient to guide Santa to Ponyville. The story ends with Minty finding a note from Santa asking if can borrow her idea to use socks in the delivery of presents.

== Songs ==
- "That's What I Love About Christmas"
- "Nothing Says Christmas Like a New Pair of Socks"
- "The Magic of Christmas"
- "That's What I Love About Christmas" (Reprise)

== Characters ==
=== Major ===
- Minty (voiced by Tabitha St. Germain) is the main protagonist of the story, an earth pony with a spring green body and a hot pink mane and tail. Her cutie mark is three swirled mint candies.She also loves collecting socks, standing on her head, and playing checkers with Sweetberry. She is also a complete klutz, always tripping into things, crashing into some obstacles, and ending up breaking things.
- Pinkie Pie (voiced by Janyse Jaud) is an earth pony with a hot pink body and a light hot pink mane & tail. Her cutie mark is three balloons. Pinkie Pie is imaginative, friendly and fun-loving, sometimes taking the lead in some situations. She also loves planning big parties and anything pink, hence her name. Other than that, she also displays some sarcastic streak over certain things and likes to hang out with Minty, despite her being a klutz.
- Rainbow Dash (voiced by Venus Terzo) is an earth pony with a sky blue body and a multicolored mane and tail. She has a rainbow on the clouds as her cutie mark. Being the most mature of all the ponies, Rainbow Dash is stylish, and also caring. She sometimes cares more about her friends than her outside appearance, though she can freak out on some occasions. She usually speaks with a British accent and always adds the word "darling" into her speeches.
- Star Catcher (voiced by Lenore Zann) is a pegasus pony with a white body and a sky blue, white and light hot pink mane and tail. Her cutie mark is a pink heart with glitter. Star Catcher resides in the secluded Butterfly Island during the events of Dancing in the Clouds until she met Skywishes. Described in Ponyville Legends to grant everyone's wish, Star Catcher loves to make friends with everyone she meets, especially to Skywishes.
- Thistle Whistle (voiced by Tabitha St. Germain) is a pegasus pony with a turquoise blue body and a bright pink and sunshine yellow mane and tail. Her cutie mark is purple thistle flowers and a butterfly. Thistle Whistle is one of Star Catcher's close friends in Butterfly Island. Like her namesake, Thistle Whistle always whistles in her speeches.

=== Minor ===
- Sweetberry (voiced by Kathleen Barr) is an earth pony with a red-violet body and a violet, spring green and white mane and tail. Her cutie mark is two strawberries and a white flower. Sweetberry is the owner of the Sweetberry Sweet Shoppe and, alongside Cotton Candy, works at the Cotton Candy Café. She likes to help each other out and also enjoys making sweet treats for her friends. Sweetberry is at times busy but very reliable.
- Cotton Candy (voiced by Kelly Sheridan) is an earth pony with a bright pink body and a sky blue, light hot pink and white mane and tail. Her cutie mark is a cotton candy on a stick. The owner of the Cotton Candy Café, in where she serves ice cream and sundaes to her friends. She is also a storyteller, enjoying conversation.
- Sparkleworks (voiced by Venus Terzo) is an earth pony with an tangerine body and a bright pink mane and tail. Her cutie mark is a yellow, pink, blue and white fireworks. Sparkleworks is a Glitzy pony, who has a big imagination and can make each and every day an adventure. She is also found of glittery stuff and Razaroo explained that she coated Ponyville with glitter during her birthday.
- Sunny Daze (voiced by Adrienne Carter) is an earth pony with a white body and a sunshine yellow, bright pink, tangerine, and violet mane and tail. Her cutie mark is an orange and pink smiling sun surrounded by purple clouds. Sunny Daze is a brave athletic pony, who usually loves outdoor activities and things with bright colors.
- Skywishes (voiced by Saffron Henderson) is an earth pony with a hot pink body and a bright pink and violet mane and tail. Her cutie mark is a kite and a butterfly. Skywishes is one of Twinkle Twirl's students, who wished to be a ballerina and usually attends Twinkle Twirl's Dance Studio. She is rather scatterbrained, but usually likes to make special wishes. She met Star Catcher, a Pegasus pony, after she discovered the Rainbow Waterfall and Butterfly Island, and was once the only pony who knew the secret of the Pegasus Ponies.

== Dancing in the Clouds ==
The DVD includes a second animated feature, Dancing in the Clouds. It was originally issued on a VHS with a Pegasus pony toy, Star Catcher. Chronologically taking place after A Charming Birthday and before Friends are Never Far Away, it shows Star Catcher's first encounter with Skywishes.

== Media ==
=== Books ===
A comic adaption was published by Tokyopop in 2005.

== Reception ==
The special received positive reviews. Mike Long of DVDtalk stated that "The translation from toy to screen and back again seems to be the norm and the obligatory Christmas special is a staple of this phenomenon. My Little Pony: A Very Minty Christmas doesn't come close to matching the holiday magic of the classic Christmas specials, but some youngsters will love the bright colors and the gentle story of a pony who just wants to give her friends a merry Christmas."

== See also ==
- List of Christmas films
- List of films about horses
