= Erin Mathews =

Canadian voice actress (born 1977)

- Born: May 28, 1977 (age 49); Toronto, Ontario, Canada
- Occupation: Voice actress
- Years active: 2000–present

Erin Mathews (born May 28, 1977) is a Canadian voice actress. She graduated from the Studio 58 theater program. She has worked in theaters across Canada, and is a founding member of the Theatre Melee collective.

== Filmography ==
| Year | Work | Role | Notes |
|---|---|---|---|
| 2001 | Ice: Beyond Cool | Sara/Inner Sara | Direct to video |
| 2007 | My Little Pony: A Very Pony Place | Lily Lightly | Direct to video |
| 2007 | Betsy Bubblegum's Journey Through Yummiland | Veronica Vanilla Almond | |
| 2008 | Barbie Mariposa | Rayla | Direct to video |
| 2008–2018 | A Kind of Magic | Tom | Television |
| 2008–2009 | Powerpuff Girls Z | Kasey/Kuriko Akatsutsumi | |
| 2008–2011 | Kid vs. Kat | Coop Burtonburger | Main role; 52 episodes |
| 2009 | My Little Pony: Twinkle Wish Adventure | Toola Roola | Direct to video |
| 2009 | Dinosaur Train | Stacie, Vera, Judy | |
| 2009–2017 | Geronimo Stilton | Benjamin Stilton | 78 episodes |
| 2011–2019 | My Little Pony: Friendship Is Magic | Little Strongheart, Gabby | 3 episodes |
| 2011–2013 | GeoFreakZ | Freakachu | 22 episodes |
| 2011 | Trinity: Souls of Zill O'll | Child Areus | |
| 2011 | Quest for Zhu | Num Nums, Surfer | |
| 2012 | Action Dad | Female Restaurant Patron | |
| 2013–2015 | Pac-Man and the Ghostly Adventures | Pac-Man, various characters | Main role |
| 2013–2014 | Sabrina: Secrets of a Teenage Witch | Zelda Spellman, Jessie | |
| 2014 | Little Astro Boy | Ken, Paul | English dub |
| 2015 | Bob the Builder | JJ and Vet Tilly | English dub |
| 2015–2017 | Lego Elves | Azari Firedancer, Naida Riverheart | |
| 2015–2017 | Lego Nexo Knights | Macy Halbert, Robin Underwood | |
| 2016–2018 | Beat Bugs | Kumi | |
| 2020–2022 | Ninjago | Lilly, Miss Demeanor, Reflectra | |
| 2021 | Future Boy Conan | Jimsy | English dub |
| 2026 | Smoking Behind the Supermarket with You | Maezawa | English dub |
