= SD Entertainment =

Dormant animation studio

SD Entertainment, Inc.
- SD Entertainment's on-screen logo used since 2002
- Type: Subsidiary
- Industry: Animation
- Founded: 1999; 27 years ago
- Founders: Paul Sabella; Jonathan Dern
- Fate: Dormancy
- Headquarters: 6303 Owensmouth Avenue, 10th Floor; Woodland Hills, CA 91367; United States
- Parent: Cineverse
- Website: http://sdentertainment.net

SD Entertainment, Inc. (more commonly known as Sabella-Dern Entertainment) is a dormant American animation studio specializing in entertainment for children. The "SD" in the initials of the company name stand for Sabella Dern, the respective last names of its founders: former MGM Animation employees Paul Sabella and Jonathan Dern and was founded in 1999.

The company is based in Woodland Hills, California. It owned two subsidiaries, Kidtoon Films and The Bigger Picture, that both also founded by Jonathan Dern, deal with the distribution of SD's productions in digital venues across the United States. They were eventually acquired by Cinedigm (now Cineverse) in 2007.

As of 2026, the company, despite still existing, has been dormant since 2011.

== List of works ==
=== TV series ===
- Transformers: Armada (English dub) (2002–2003)
- Make Way for Noddy (2002–2003)
- My Little Pony (2003–2009)
- Alien Racers (2005–2006)
- Care Bears: Adventures in Care-a-lot (2007–2008)
- Angelina Ballerina: The Next Steps (2009–2010)
- Bob the Builder: Ready, Steady, Build! (2010–2011)
- Burka Avenger (2013-2016)

=== Films ===
| Release date | Title |
|---|---|
| 2003 | Major Powers and the Star Squad |
| 2003 | Welcome to Tonka Town |
| December 28, 2004 | Mulan II (Note: Provided animation alongside Wang Film Productions.) |
| March 8, 2005 | Candy Land: The Great Lollipop Adventure |
| May 17, 2005 | Dinotopia: Quest for the Ruby Sunstone |
| October 25, 2005 | My Little Pony: A Very Minty Christmas |
| February 7, 2006 | My Little Pony: The Princess Promenade |
| September 12, 2006 | Bratz Babyz: The Movie |
| September 12, 2006 | My Little Pony Crystal Princess: The Runaway Rainbow |
| February 6, 2007 | My Little Pony: A Very Pony Place |
| August 4, 2007 | Care Bears: Oopsy Does It! |
| October 13, 2009 | My Little Pony: Twinkle Wish Adventure |
| April 3, 2010 | Care Bears: To The Rescue |
| November 2, 2010 | Care Bears: The Giving Festival |
| November 6, 2010 | Care Bears: Share Bear Shines |
| 2011 | Hydee and the Hytops: The Movie |
