= 1996 Summer Olympics opening ceremony =

- Part of 1996 Summer Olympics
- Date: July 19, 1996
- Time: 20:30–00:30 EDT (UTC−4) (4 hours)
- Venue: Centennial Olympic Stadium
- Location: Atlanta, Georgia, United States; 33°44′08″N 84°23′22″W
- Also known as: The Centennial Games
- Filmed by: Atlanta Olympic Broadcasting (AOB)
- Footage: Atlanta 1996 Opening Ceremony on YouTube

The opening ceremony of the 1996 Summer Olympics took place in the evening on Friday, July 19 at the Centennial Olympic Stadium, Atlanta, United States. It was the first time in the modern Olympics history to open on Friday instead of Saturday in previous years. As mandated by the Olympic Charter, the proceedings combined the formal and ceremonial opening of this international sporting event, including welcoming speeches, hoisting of the flags and the parade of athletes, with an artistic spectacle to showcase the host nation's culture and history. The Games were officially opened by President of the United States of America Bill Clinton.

The Olympic cauldron was lit by former gold medalist and boxing champion Muhammad Ali. The ceremony featured film composer John Williams, French Canadian singer Celine Dion and American singer Gladys Knight. The ceremony attendance was 85,600.

The ceremony was produced and directed by Don Mischer. It was watched by an estimated 3.6 billion viewers worldwide. To emphasize the significance of the event as the Centennial Olympics, the Atlanta 1996 Opening Ceremony was distinct from previous ceremonies. Instead of following a chronological order from the past to the future, it unfolded in reverse chronological order, starting in 1996 Atlanta and moving backwards through history. This journey culminated in the revival of Pierre de Coubertin's late 19th-century Olympic revival, with visual references to the Ancient Games.

== Dignitaries ==
The ceremony was attended by many world leaders.

=== Dignitaries from international organizations ===
- United Nations – Secretary-General Boutros Boutros-Ghali
- European Union – Vice President Frans Andriessen
- Organization of American States – Secretary General Cesar Gaviria
- International Olympic Committee –
  - President Juan Antonio Samaranch and wife María Teresa Salisachs Rowe
  - Members of the International Olympic Committee

=== Host nation dignitaries ===
- United States –
  - President Bill Clinton
  - First Lady Hillary Clinton
  - President & CEO of ACOG Billy Payne and wife Martha Payne
  - Former President Jimmy Carter
  - Former First Lady Rosalynn Carter
  - Civil Rights Leader Coretta Scott King
  - actor Bruce Willis and actresses Demi Moore and Jane Fonda and husband Ted Turner
  - Speaker Newt Gingrich
  - Real Estate Tycoon Donald Trump and wife actress Marla Maples Trump

=== Foreign dignitaries ===
- Canada – Prime Minister Jean Chretien (representing the Queen and Governor General of Canada)
- Mexico – President Ernesto Zedillo
- Brazil – President Fernando Henrique Cardoso
- Argentina – President Carlos Menem
- Bolivia – President Gonzalo Sanchez de Lozada
- France – President Jacques Chirac
- Belgium – Crown Prince Philippe (representing the King of Belgium)
- Portugal – President Jorge Sampaio
- Namibia – Prime Minister Hage Geingob
- Russia – Prime Minister Viktor Chernomyrdin
- United Kingdom –
  - Princess Anne (representing the Queen of the United Kingdom)
  - Deputy Prime Minister Michael Heseltine
- Italy – Prime Minister Massimo D’Alema
- Lithuania – President Algirdas Brazauskas
- Netherlands – Prime Minister Wim Kok
- Greece – President Konstantinos Stephanopoulos
- Germany –
  - Chancellor Helmut Kohl
  - Two time Olympic Gold Medalist Katarina Witt
- Turkey – Prime Minister Necmettin Erbakan
- South Africa – Deputy President Thabo Mbeki and Zanele Dlamini Mbeki
- Rwanda – Vice President Paul Kagame
- Lebanon – Prime Minister Rafic Hariri
- Australia:
  - Viceregal Consort Helen Deane (representing the Queen and Governor-General of Australia)
  - Prime Minister Paul Keating
  - Lord Mayor of Sydney Frank Sartor (host city of 2000 Summer Olympics)
- Japan:
  - Prime Minister Ryutaro Hashimoto (representing the Emperor of Japan)
  - Mayor of Nagano Tasuku Tsukada (host city of 1998 Winter Olympics)
- Philippines – First Lady Amelita Ramos
- Bosnia and Herzegovina – Prime Minister Hasan Muratović
- Poland – President Aleksander Kwaśniewski
- Finland – President Martti Ahtisaari
- Belarus – President Aleksander Lukashenko
- Monaco – Prince Rainier III
- Luxembourg – Grand Duke Jean
- Norway – Crown Prince Haakon (representing the King of Norway)
- Denmark – Prime Minister Poul Nyrup Rasmussen
- San Marino – Captains Regent Pietro Bugli and Pier Paolo Gasperoni
- Sweden – King Carl XVI Gustaf
- Spain – Crown Prince Felipe and Queen Sofia (representing the King of Spain)
- Dominica – Prime Minister Edison James
- (United States Virgin Islands) US Virgin Islands – Governor Roy Schneider
- (Serbia and Montenegro) Yugoslavia – President Zoran Lilić
- Saint Kitts and Nevis – Prime Minister Denzil Douglas
- Israel – Prime Minister Benjamin Netanyahu

== Proceedings ==
=== Countdown ===
The ceremony began with a countdown at the screen coming from 60 to 1. Starting at 22, footage from previous games appeared with Atlanta at the end complete with an image of fireworks, with a few seconds fireworks display along with numbers between 22 and 1 being from previous games until 0 from the current games.

- 22 - 1896 Athens
- 21 - 1900 Paris
- 20 - 1904 St. Louis
- 19 - 1908 London
- 18 - 1912 Stockholm
- 17 - 1920 Antwerp
- 16 - 1924 Paris
- 15 - 1928 Amsterdam
- 14 - 1932 Los Angeles
- 13 - 1936 Berlin
- 12 - 1948 London
- 11 - 1952 Helsinki
- 10 - 1956 Melbourne (Ten)
- 9 - 1960 Rome (Nine)
- 8 - 1964 Tokyo (Eight)
- 7 - 1968 Mexico City (Seven)
- 6 - 1972 Munich (Six)
- 5 - 1976 Montreal (Five)
- 4 - 1980 Moscow (Four)
- 3 - 1984 Los Angeles (Three)
- 2 - 1988 Seoul (Two)
- 1 - 1992 Barcelona (One)
- 0 - 1996 Atlanta

=== The Call to the Nations ===
The segment began by airing a flashback from the Barcelona 1992 Summer Olympics closing ceremony in August 1992 which showed International Olympic Committee President Juan Antonio Samaranch inviting the athletes to compete in Atlanta before the announcers welcomed the world to the ceremony in French and English.

Allegoric spirits then rose from the northwest corner of the stadium in response to the president's invitation. Representing the Olympic colors of Red (Americas), Green (Oceania), Black (Africa), Yellow (Asia), and Blue (Europe), they each rose to the beat of their own percussion. They summoned tribes out to the stadium floor with their own color and the percussion began to mix. Meanwhile, US Army Paratroopers rappelled down from the stadium roof trailing long colorful papers representing the colors while the tribes formed the Rings of the Olympic flag and the Children of Atlanta, dressed in white, formed the number 100 representing the Centennial of the Olympic Games.

Then the Atlanta Symphony Orchestra, under the direction of famed film composer John Williams, played "Summon the Heroes", which was the official anthem of the 1996 Olympics. (This was actually his second piece of music for the Olympics with the first being Olympic Fanfare and Theme from the 1984 games.) As the music started, the children formed a flying dove, which is a symbol of the Olympic movement as doves symbolize peace. As the music continued, the five tribes intermingled until there was a huge mixture of humanity at the center of the stadium with the tribes all mingled together as one to symbolize the gathering of nations at the Olympics.

=== The National Anthem ===
Following the Call to the Nations, the first official protocol of the ceremony took place. This called for the head of state to make his or her entrance. In this case the head of state was Bill Clinton, the 42nd President of the United States. He was joined by Atlanta Committee for the Olympic Games President Billy Payne and IOC President Juan Antonio Samaranch. After the presentation of colors, the American flag was raised while the Atlanta Symphony Orchestra (now conducted by Robert Shaw) and the Centennial Olympic Choir performed the U.S. national anthem, The Star-Spangled Banner. A fly-by from the USAF Thunderbirds concluded the segment.

=== Welcome to the World ===
The Artistic portion of the ceremony began and first up was a rousing number called "Welcome to the World," composed by songwriting team Jimmy Jam and Terry Lewis. This was an over the top number featuring cheerleaders, marching bands, and steppers, as all activities originated in the United States. They performed a montage of southern culture in the deep south including the college sporting culture as well as performing an all-American party. The audience also participated as they performed the wave. Assisting the cast were chromed Chevrolet pick-up trucks a nod the U.S. auto industry with spotlights in the beds. The segment ended with a fireworks display.

=== Georgia on My Mind ===
Gladys Knight sang "Georgia on My Mind", Georgia's official state song, at the opening ceremony.

=== Summertime: The Beauty of the South ===
This was the longest artistic segment of the ceremony. Entitled "Summertime: The Beauty of the South," the focus was on Atlanta and the Old South with an emphasis on its beauty, spirit, music, history, culture and rebirth after the American Civil War. During the segment James Earl Jones quoted famous American writers Zora Neale Hurston, William Faulkner, and Mark Twain.

The segment began with two people, each dressed in large butterfly-like wingspans. One butterfly represented the Moon and the other the Sun, positioned on opposite ends of the stadium. They met in the center and created the "American Southern Spirit". The American Southern Spirit was portrayed by a female operatic singer dressed all in white with large butterfly wingspans. The southern spirit butterfly, along with other performers dressed as butterflies and fireflies, danced to southern music. They welcomed the spring with Jazz and Gospel music. Songs included "Ol' Man River", "Skip to My Lou", and "When the Saints Go Marching In". This was meant to represent the American South during the antebellum period of American history.

During the celebration, a large mechanical thunderbird appeared from the north end of the stadium and engulfed all the butterflies and fireflies on the stadium floor with a large gray cover. The large creature represented the American Civil War and the damage caused by Sherman's March to the Sea to the city, the American South, and the nation as a whole. The performers and the southern spirit butterfly were left ravaged, in shock, and saddened. The southern spirit butterfly was devastated, but she slowly brought the other butterflies and creatures back to life with her operatic voice. She reawakened the creatures. Fifty southern spirit-dressed butterflies reappeared, all dressed with multi-colored wingspans. They represented a new and reborn South. The entire stadium was relit with colored flashlights provided to the audience, and the music began to play "Alleluyah, Glory, Glory (Lay My Burden Down)" in gospel music, followed by a reprise of "When the Saints Go Marching In". The Atlanta Symphony Orchestra and the Atlanta Centennial Choir (Atlanta Symphony Orchestra Chorus, Morehouse College Glee Club & Spelman College Glee Club) performed all the music. The segment ended with a large fireworks display.

=== Temple of Zeus ===
The stadium was then darkened, and a temple was produced at the centre of the stadium, representing the ancient Greek Olympics. This was a large temple dedicated to Zeus, featuring eight pillars, each weighing 2,500 pounds, arranged in an octagonal shape at the center of the stadium. A procession of Greek athletes and Greek priestesses walked towards the pillars, simulating preparation for athletic competition. Each manually adjustable cable of the eight pillars simultaneously hoisted up an upper perimeter of the large screen until the screen formed its upright 360° octagonal shape. Once hoisted, eight to sixteen actors and dancers located between the interior of the screen and a central 20,000-watt arc light cast body-shadows or silhouettes portraying athletes or goddesses, at times reaching nearly 50 feet in height. They struck the poses of the classic events of the ancient Olympics: archery, the discus, wrestling, and running. The goddess of victory then appeared to honor the champions. The music used during this segment was called "The Tradition of the Games," composed by Basil Poledouris. The segment ended with everything going dark, signifying the end of the ancient Olympics. Behind the scenes, workers removed the tarp from the track.

=== Parade of Nations ===
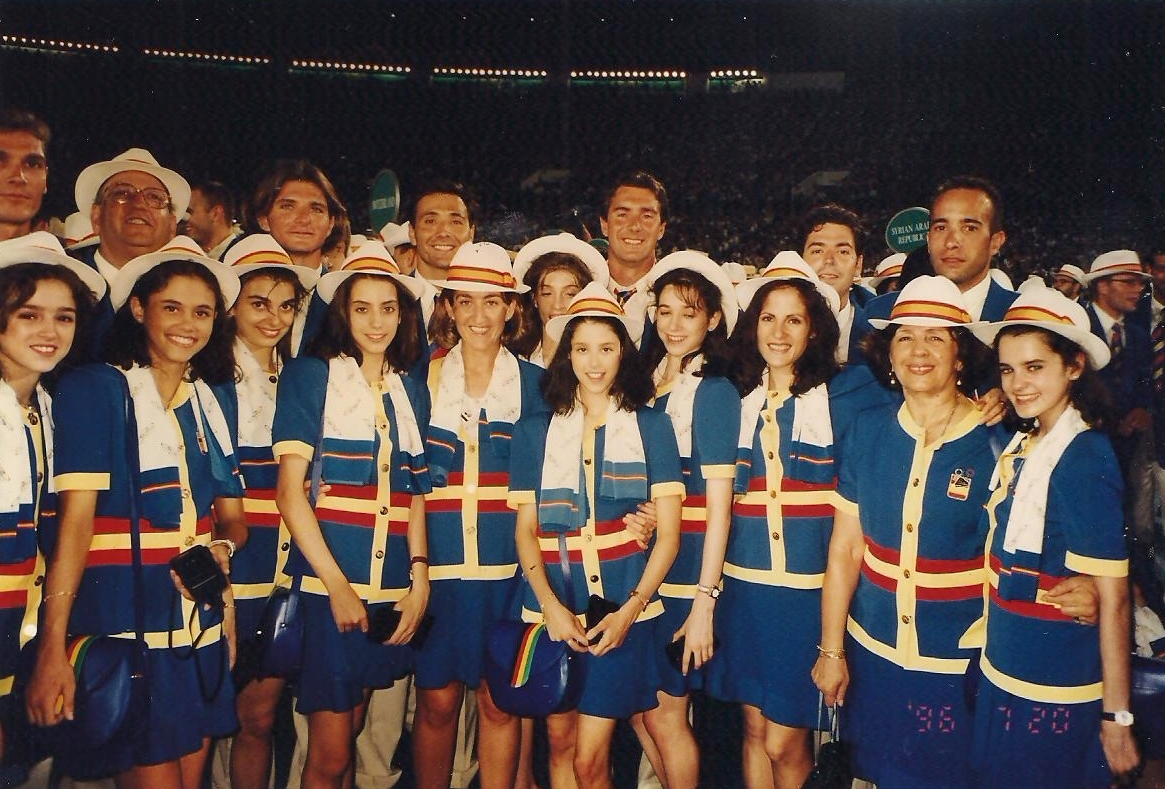
Spain at the opening ceremony

A tribute to Baron Pierre de Coubertin began, with his voice echoing through the stadium, proclaiming the rebirth of the modern Olympics. This was followed by a reprise of the Call of the Nations, where the five Olympic spirits rose once more, symbolizing the revival of the modern games.

The stadium then lit up, revealing the track and a stage where the temple had stood. Runners representing previous Olympic Games, starting with Athens and ending with Barcelona, appeared one by one, circling the track. The Atlanta flag-bearer followed and overtook the others, running up a ramp in the northwest part of the stadium. She waved in celebration before disappearing into the night. Shortly after, the Greek delegation emerged, signaling the start of the Parade of Nations. Then 195 nations marched in alphabetical order with the United States entering last as the host nation. Though not all athletes attended the opening ceremony, over 10,000 were scheduled to compete.

=== Olympic Speeches, the Olympic Flag, and the symbolic release of Doves ===
Following the parade, ACOG president Billy Payne and IOC president Juan Antonio Samaranch delivered opening remarks welcoming everybody to the Games. Then U.S. president Bill Clinton opened the games by saying.

"I declare open the Games of Atlanta, celebrating the XXVI Olympiad of the modern era."

— Bill Clinton, President of the United States of America

Then the Olympic flag made its entrance. It was carried by 8 American Olympians from the past while the Atlanta Symphony Orchestra performed the tune "Simple Gifts." Then the Olympic flag was raised while the Olympic Hymn was played by the Atlanta Symphony Orchestra and sung by the Centennial Olympic Choir.

Following the flag raising, 100 kids ran papier-mâché doves around the stadium symbolising the peaceful gathering of athletes from across the world. This was followed by a playing of portions of Atlanta native son, Dr. Martin Luther King Jr.'s I Have a Dream speech which he delivered in 1963 with a gospel choir by the Centennial Olympic Choir and played by Atlanta Symphony Orchestra.

Finally, Olympic heroes from the past were honored, including Leon Štukelj, who was then the oldest living gold medalist, having earned his first gold in the 1924 Paris Olympics.

=== The Olympic flame and oaths ===
Al Oerter carried the torch to the stadium and was the last to hold the torch outside of the stadium. He passed the torch to Evander Holyfield who ran with it through a network of tunnels and then made his appearance inside the stadium to a thunderous ovation on the stage in the middle of the field. Beethoven's Ninth Symphony (Ode to Joy) was played in the background. Holyfield ran with the torch down to the track and was joined by Greek athlete Voula Patoulidou. They both held the torch and made a lap around the track. This symbolized the relationship between the first and current Olympic Games. The pair then passed the torch to American swimmer Janet Evans, the penultimate torchbearer, who carried it around a lap of the track and up a long ramp leading towards the northern end of the stadium. After more than 10,000 torch bearers, Muhammad Ali, who suffered from Parkinson's disease, dramatically lit the Olympic cauldron.

Then the oaths were given. US Basketball athlete Teresa Edwards gave the Athletes' Oath on behalf of all athletes. Then diving official Hobie Billingsley delivered the officials' oath.

=== The Power of the Dream ===
Music completed the ceremony. First up was the song "The Power of the Dream ", composed by David Foster and performed by Celine Dion, accompanied by David Foster on piano, the Atlanta Symphony Orchestra and the Centennial Choir (Morehouse College Glee Club, Spelman College Glee Club and the Atlanta Symphony Orchestra Chorus). The song became the unofficial anthem of the Atlanta games. At the Closing Ceremony, the children of Atlanta performed the song as their farewell to the world. To close the opening ceremony, Jessye Norman performed the song "Faster, Higher, Stronger," composed by Mark Watters with lyrics by Lorraine Feather.

== Anthems ==
Both anthems were performed by the Atlanta Symphony Orchestra and the Centennial Olympic Choir.

- National Anthem of the United States
- (International Olympic Committee) Olympic Hymn
