= My Little Pony: The Princess Promenade =

2006 animated film

- DVD Cover for My Little Pony: The Princess Promenade
- Directed by: Vic Dal Chele
- Written by: Jeanne Romano
- Based on: My Little Pony by Bonnie Zacherle
- Starring: Tabitha St. Germain; Janyse Jaud; Venus Terzo; Jillian Michaels; Kathleen Barr; Kelly Sheridan; Adrienne Carter; Ellen Kennedy; Brian Drummond; Andrea Libman; Chantal Strand; Britt McKillip
- Music by: Mark Watters
- Production companies: SD Entertainment; Hasbro Entertainment
- Distributed by: Paramount Home Entertainment
- Release date: February 7, 2006
- Running time: 66 minutes (Feature: 44 minutes)
- Countries: United States; Canada
- Language: English

My Little Pony: The Princess Promenade is a 2006 direct-to-video animated musical family fantasy film produced by SD Entertainment and distributed by Paramount Home Entertainment in association with Hasbro. The film is the second feature in the third incarnation of the My Little Pony series and the first film to promote the Crystal Princess line. It featured the debut of the Breezies and the 2006 re-design of Spike the Dragon, who originally featured in the first My Little Pony series from the 1980s.

The film received mostly positive reviews from critics, and became the first successful My Little Pony animation to date, before the debut of My Little Pony: Friendship Is Magic. It has a strong following amongst "G3" collectors, and has been positively received by many since its DVD debut in 2006. The DVD also features two bonus episodes: A Charming Birthday, which was originally released on video in 2003 and Pinkie Pie and the Ladybug Jamboree. The film is notable for being the MLP animation that was sent to Lauren Faust in the hopes of retooling the My Little Pony series.

The movie has been reissued in the 2-disc DVD collection My Little Pony: Classic Movie Collection, alongside The Runaway Rainbow, Dancing in the Clouds and Friends are Never Far Away.

Alongside Crystal Princess: The Runaway Rainbow and Twinkle Wish Adventure, the film premiered on August 8, 2014 on the Hub Network after its "My Little Pony Mega Mare-athon". According to Broadway World, the "Mega Mare-athon" itself drew in 5.4 million viewers and has earned significant delivery growth on every demographic measured by Nielsen: Kids 2-11 (+134%), Girls 2-11 (+179%), Kids 6-11 (+169%), Girls 6-11 (+216%), Adults 18-49 (+111%), Women 18-49 (+146%), Adults 25-54 (+74%), Women 25-54 (+76%), Persons 2+ (+124%) and Households (+98%).

== Summary ==
As Spring approaches, the Breezies travel to Ponyville to help prepare for the Spring Promenade, Ponyville's fanciest parade. They join ponies in decorating the garden for the promenade, but Wysteria despairs when she finds a weed growing. Trying to uproot it, Wysteria and Pinkie Pie fall into a cave into which Tiddly Wink, Zipzee, and Tra La La follow after them.

The ponies and breezies find Spike, a dragon who has been sleeping in the cave for roughly a thousand of years. He has a flower wrapped around his tail, which he explains belongs to Wysteria as the first pony to touch it. After returning to the surface, the ponies take Spike to be groomed before introducing him to Ponyville. He reveals that he is supposed to protect and serve Wysteria, whom he reveals to now be a princess after receiving Spike's flower.

In her new found position, Wysteria is drawn away from preparations for the promenade, which Pinkie dubs a "Princess Promenade" in light of the news. Spike tries to lecture Wysteria on her new duties but this only overwhelms her. And as conflicts arise about the organization of the promenade floats, Wysteria is further frustrated by being sidelined from the process. She comes to lament becoming a princess, but after confronting Spike she reconsiders the nature of being a Princess. On the day of the Promenade, Wysteria declares each of her friends a princess.

== Songs ==
- "Breezie Blossom"
- "Friendship and Flowers"
- "Feelin' Good"
- "A Princess is in Town"
- "Everypony is a Princess"

== Characters ==
=== Major characters ===
Wysteria
Voiced by: Tabitha St. Germain

Wysteria is an earth pony with a violet body and an amethyst purple, white, and hot pink mane and tail. Her cutie mark is wisteria flowers. Wysteria is Ponyville's gardener and organizer of the Spring Promenade. She is shown to be a good gardener who loves flowers. She is shy, but she finds a way to fill every activity with laughter and fun. After awakening Spike from his 1000-year sleep by touching the flower, she became Princess Wysteria, The Princess of Ponyville. But despite being a princess, she feels very sad being bound by the rules while watching her friends do all the hard work for the parade. After she convinced Spike to help her for the Spring Promenade and made it a success, she then appointed all her friends as Princesses.

Pinkie Pie
Voiced by: Janyse Jaud

Pinkie Pie is an earth pony with a hot pink body and a light hot pink mane and tail. Her cutie mark is three balloons. Pinkie Pie is imaginative, friendly and fun-loving, sometimes taking the lead in some situations. She also loves planning big parties and anything pink, referring to her name. Other than that, she also likes to hang out with Minty, despite her being a klutz.

Rainbow Dash
Voiced by: Venus Terzo

Rainbow Dash is an earth pony with a sky blue body and a multicolored mane and tail. She has a rainbow on the clouds as her cutie mark. Being the most mature of all the ponies, Rainbow Dash is stylish, and also caring. She herself sometimes cares about her friends more than her outside appearance, though she can freak out on some occasions. She usually speaks with a British accent and always adds the word "darling" into her speeches.

Minty
Voiced by: Tabitha St. Germain

Minty is an earth pony with a spring green body and a hot pink mane and tail. Her cutie mark is three swirled mint candies. Minty is described to be a green machine, who likes anything green. She also loves collecting socks, standing on her head and playing checkers with Sweetberry. She is also a complete klutz, always tripping into some things without looking where she is going, or crashing to some obstacles and ending up breaking things. Minty also has obsessive compulsive tendencies.

Razzaroo
Voiced by: Jillian Michaels

Razzaroo is an earth pony with a lavender body and a sky blue, light hot pink, and white mane and tail. Her cutie mark is a green and yellow parcel tied with pink and white ribbons. The main protagonist of A Charming Birthday, Razzaroo is Ponyville's resident party planner. She always plans everyone's birthday using her Birthday Book. In the special, she and her friends did a surprise party for Kimono.

Kimono
Voiced by: Kathleen Barr

Kimono is an earth pony with a mauve body and a violet mane and tail. Her cutie mark is two yellow Japanese lanterns with flower designs. Kimono is the wise sage of Ponyville and also the keeper of all pony legends and lore. Known to be knowledgeable, she is often sought for advice by the ponies. Although she is born in Ponyville, she prefers to live in the outskirts of town.

=== Minor characters ===
Sweetberry
Voiced by Kathleen Barr

Sweetberry is an earth pony with a red-violet body and a violet, spring green and white mane and tail. Her cutie mark is two strawberries and a white flower. Sweetberry is the owner of the Sweetberry Sweet Shoppe and alongside Cotton Candy, works at the Cotton Candy Cafe. She likes to help each other out in and also likes to make several sweet treats for her friends. She is sometimes busy but very reliable.

Cotton Candy
Voiced by Kelly Sheridan

Cotton Candy is an earth pony with a bright pink body and a sky blue, light hot pink, and white mane and tail. Her cutie mark is a cone of cotton candy. She is the owner of the Cotton Candy Cafe, where she serves ice cream and sundaes to her friends. She is also a storyteller, and enjoys conversation.

Sparkleworks
Voiced by Venus Terzo

Sparkleworks is an earth pony with an tangerine body and a bright pink mane and tail. Her cutie mark is a yellow, red, blue and white fireworks. Sparkleworks is a glitzy pony, who has a big imagination and can make each and every day an adventure. She is also found of glittery stuff and Razaroo explained that she coated Ponyville with glitter during her birthday.

Sunny Daze
Voiced by Adrienne Carter

Sunny Daze is an earth pony with a white body and a sunshine yellow, bright pink, tangerine and violet mane and tail. Her cutie mark is an orange and pink smiling sun surrounded by purple clouds. Sunny Daze is a brave, athletic pony, who usually loves outdoor activities and things with bright colors.

Daffidazey
Voiced by: Ellen Kennedy

Daffidazey is an earth pony with a white body and a sunshine yellow, tangerine, bright pink, sky blue and violet mane and tail. Her cutie mark is an orange, yellow and purple flower with three green leaves. Daffidazey is Ponyville's hair stylist, who runs the Twist n' Style Petal Parlor. She values cleanliness highly and can't usually see well unless she uses her glasses. She also has good styling skills and even fixed up Spike, despite being dirty and all messed up.

Spike
Voiced by: Brian Drummond

Spike is a dragon with indigo scales and amber spikes. Spike resides deep under the Celebration Castle in Ponyville until Wysteria woke him up from his 1000-year sleep. Because of this, he explained that whoever touched the flower Spike's holding, she'll be appointed as the Princess of Ponyville in which Wysteria has the role. He is shown to be knowledgeable on things and gives the ponies some advice.

Zipzee
Voiced by: Andrea Libman

Zipzee is a Breezy with a sunshine yellow body, a sunshine yellow antennae and an amber mane and tail with a sunshine yellow streak. Her cutie mark is two orange and white flowers. She is always seen with Tiddly Wink and Tra La La, living in Breezy Blossom. Unlike the two, she has an allergy to pollen and flowers, and ends up sneezing like crazy when she's near one - though she doesn't let this keep her away from them, as she loves the smell of Spring. When together with Tiddly Wink and Tra La La, they decide together on where to go or what to do.

Tiddly Wink
Voiced by: Chantal Strand

Tiddly Wink is a Breezy with a violet body, a bright pink antenna and a amethyst purple mane and tail with a bright pink streak. Her cutie mark is a purple flower. She is always seen with Zipzee and Tra La La, living in Breezy Blossom. When together with Zipzee and Tra La La, they decide together on where to go or what to do.

Tra La La
Voiced by: Britt McKillip

Tra La La is a Breezy with a light hot pink body, a light hot pink antenna and a hot pink mane and tail. Her cutie mark is a pink flower. She is always seen with Zipzee and Tiddly Wink, living in Breezy Blossom. When together with Tiddly Wink and Zipzee, they decide together on where to go or what to do.

== Bonus episodes ==
=== A Charming Birthday ===
The DVD includes a second animated feature, titled A Charming Birthday, originally issued on a VHS alongside the Glitter Celebration Ponies in 2003. Chronologically taking place before Dancing in the Clouds, it shows how the ponies in Ponyville planned a special surprise party for Kimono.

=== Pinkie Pie and the Ladybug Jamboree ===
The DVD includes a short animated feature, titled Pinkie Pie and the Ladybug Jamboree which is made specially for the film. The story is set after The Princess Promenade and before The Runaway Rainbow, explaining Pinkie Pie's band named "Pinkie Pie's Ladybug Jamboree".

== Media ==
=== Books ===
A storybook adaptation of the film was created by Nora Pelizzari and was published by HarperFestival on January 3, 2006. A comic adaption is also published by Tokyopop in 2006.

== Reception ==
DVD Talk editor Mike Long said that "However, I found the previous entry into this series, A Very Minty Christmas, to be goofy fun which offered enough charm to be enjoyed by adults and children. That movie took a familiar plot, the clumsy soul who almost ruins Christmas, and put some new twists on it while fully integrating it into the pony world. The Princess Promenade does very little to distinguish itself from any of the other home videos out there aimed primarily at young girls. At some point, simply having ponies and princesses doesn't cut it and one should expect a good story." He also stated in the same review that "I realize that I may sound curmudgeonly in my assessment of My Little Pony: The Princess Promenade, but when it comes to entertainment for my kids, I want something that tries a little harder, and this show doesn't meet those standards. Still, fans of "My Little Pony" (such as my daughters) will enjoy the program, but it probably won't be one that they watch over and over."

Internet Movie Database gives it a score of 7.8, being the second highest scoring My Little Pony animation to date, first being My Little Pony: Friendship Is Magic (which scored an 8.7).

== Inspiration ==
According to Lauren Faust, she stated that she used some of the ideas in the DVD special on her pitching for My Little Pony: Friendship Is Magic, as Lisa Licht of Hasbro Studios considered that Faust's style was well suited to that line and asked her to consider "some ideas where to take a new version of the franchise."

== See also ==
- List of films about horses
