= My Little Pony Live: The World's Biggest Tea Party =

2006 musical

- Music: Mark Watters; Jon Baker
- Basis: My Little Pony by Bonnie Zacherle
- Productions: 2006—2008

My Little Pony Live: The World's Biggest Tea Party is a 2006 musical based on the My Little Pony franchise by Hasbro. The musical is produced by VEE Corporation under the direction of Richard Thompson and Vincent Egan. The musical first began in October 2006 and later concluded its performance in 2008.

The musical was released on DVD by Paramount Home Entertainment on September 16, 2008 and was filmed at the Kodak Theatre. All shows were performed to a pre-recorded soundtrack.

The stage show received mixed reviews from critics, audiences and fans alike, with the costume designs of the ponies being a major point of criticism.

== Synopsis ==
The ponies in Ponyville need to figure out what they are going to do today. They have so many ideas such as dressing up and playing with ribbons and bows, but don't want to do either of them. So they decide do it all and put on the world's biggest tea party.

== Reception ==
Critical reception for the DVD has been mixed, with Blog Critics stating that while older fans "may want to stick with the animated DVDs", the movie "captures the essence of Hasbro's My Little Pony". Carey Bryson of About.com gave the DVD three stars, praising the movie's ability to hold the attention of children but wishing that the DVD would "have included a featurette about the making of the show". DVD Verdict also reviewed the release, writing that "providing your impressionable youngster won't get creeped out by the sight of her beloved two-dimensional animated pony pals suddenly transforming into real-life visions of surreal terror, there's a solid chance they'll be smiling and mumbling through the lyrics and demanding with some vigor that you take them to the next live My Little Pony show—or else." Common Sense Media criticized the DVD's low educational value, saying that parents "will definitely be bored" and that "kids who love the toys would probably enjoy seeing this live more than watching it on DVD".
