= Rose (color) =

Color between red and magenta plus its shades

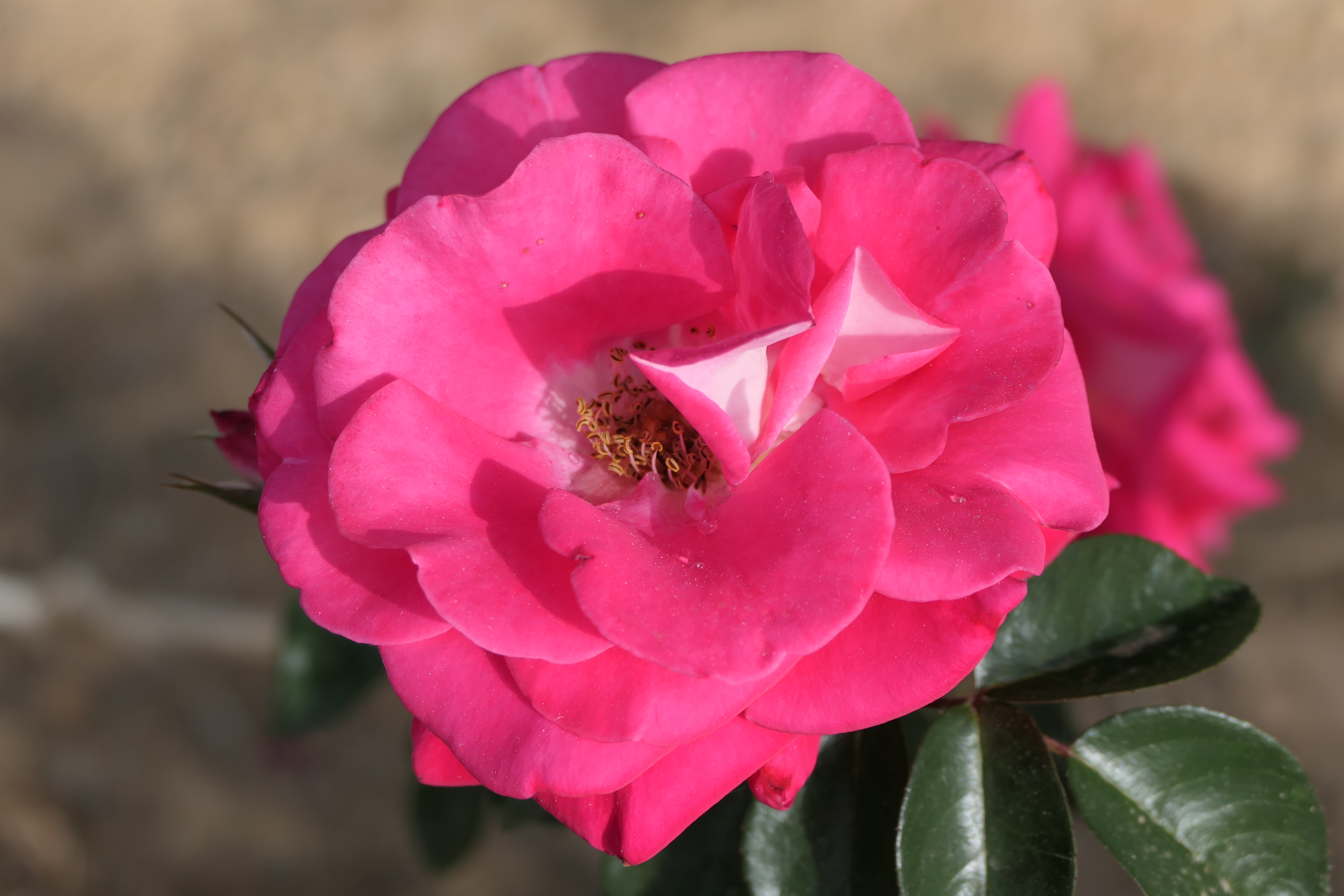
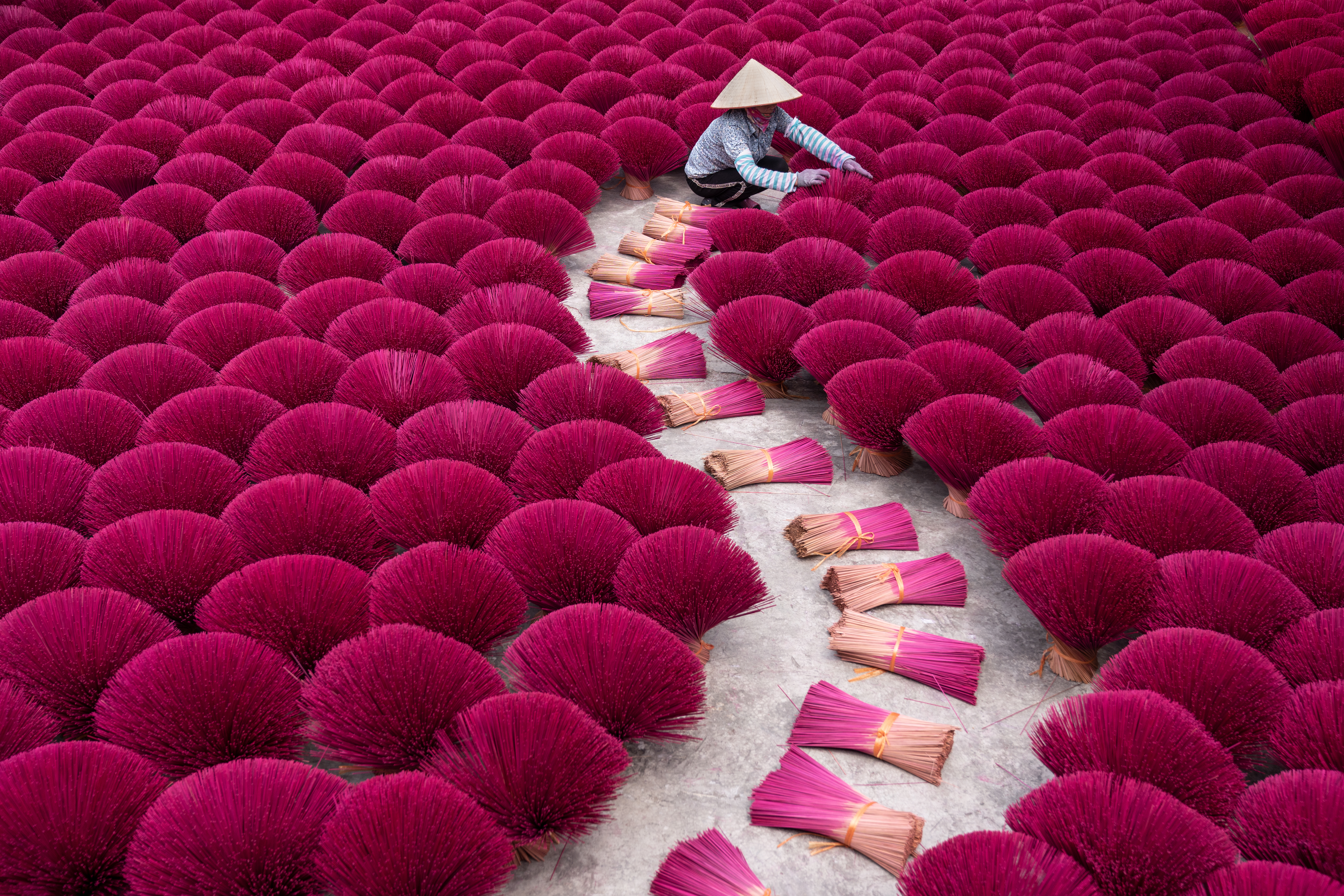
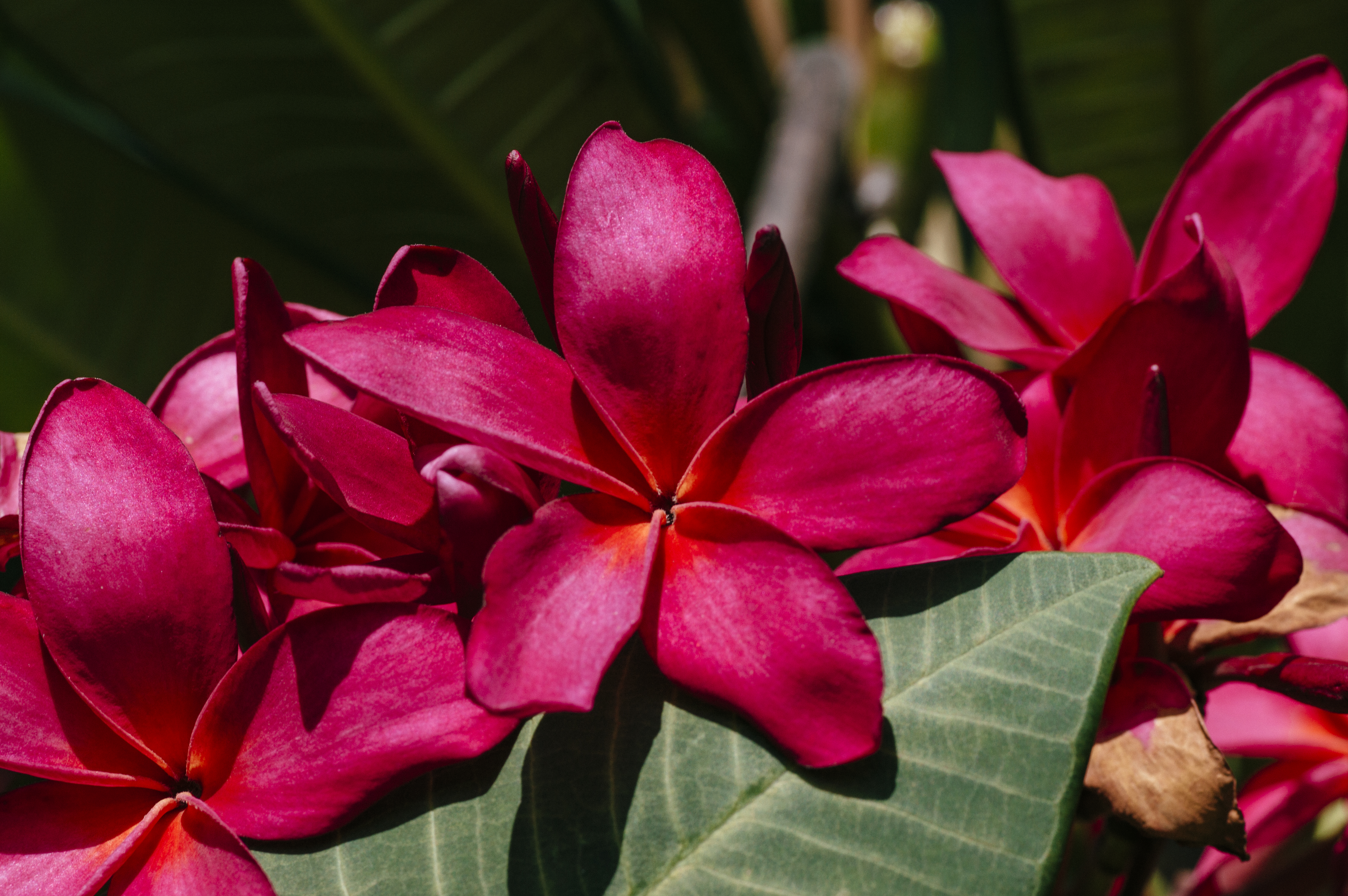
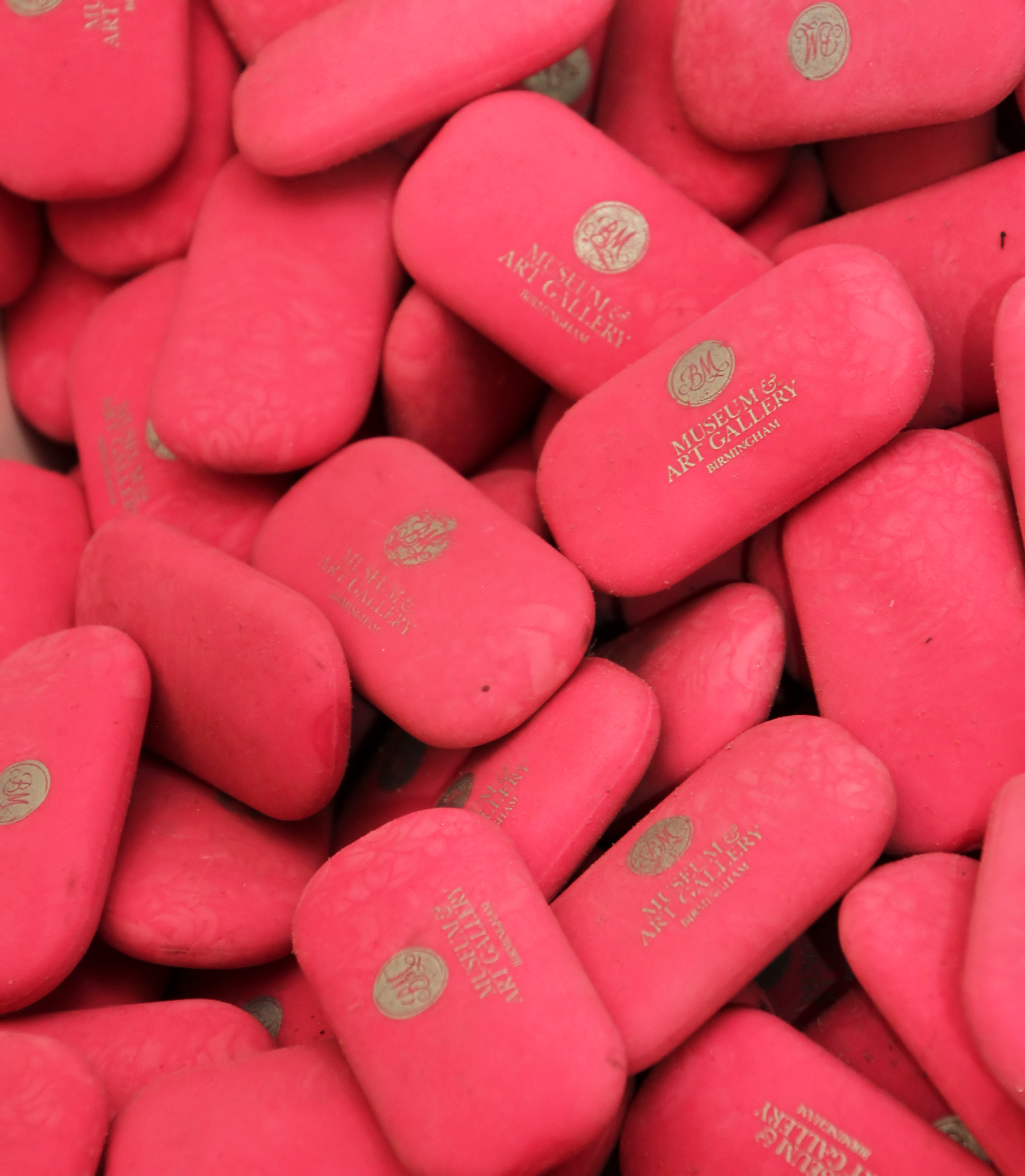
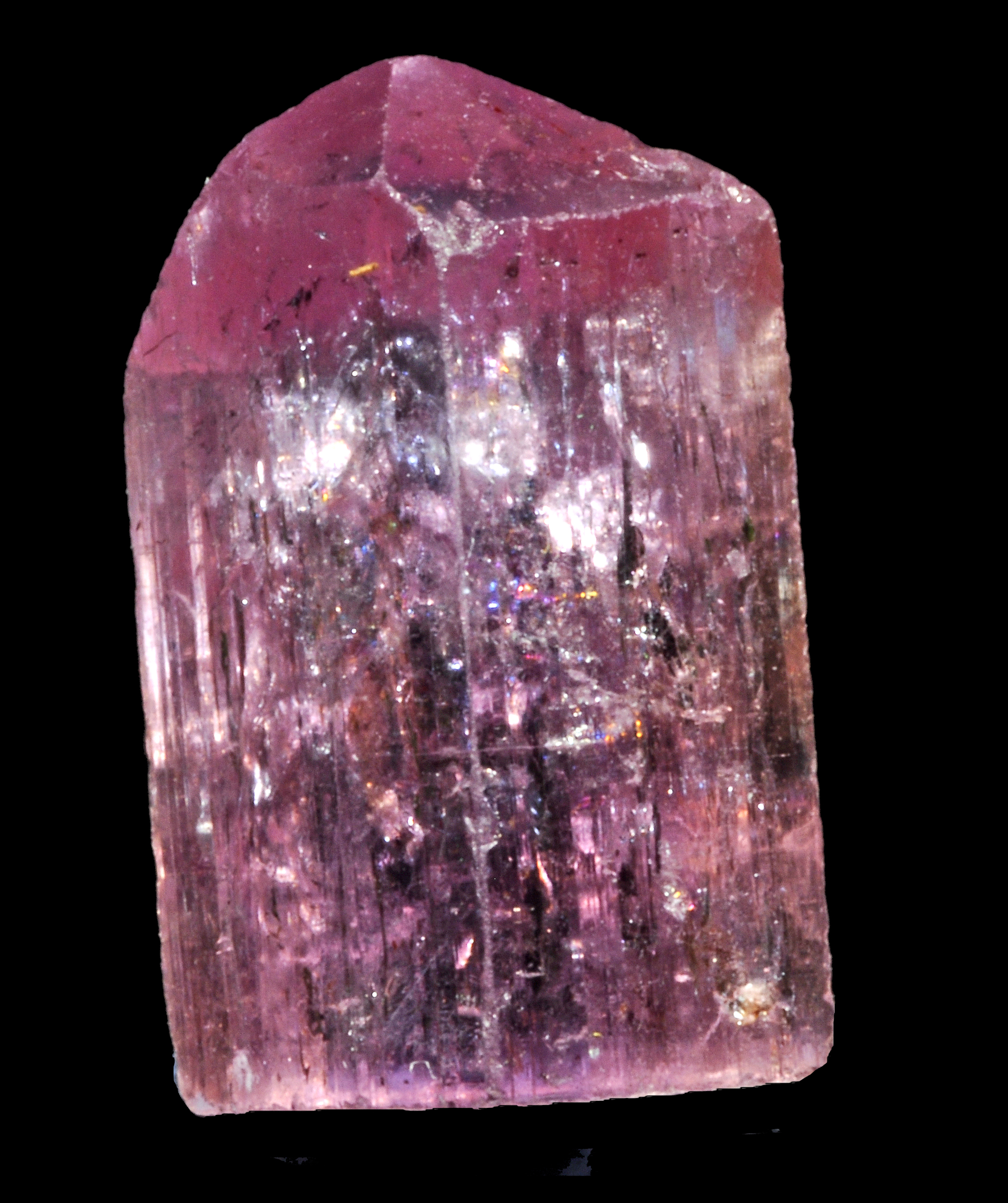
- Clockwise, from top left: Blooming rose; Incense production in Vietnam; Blooming plumerias; Uncut topaz; Pile of erasers.

Rose is the color whose name is derived from the flower of the same name.

== Etymology of rose ==
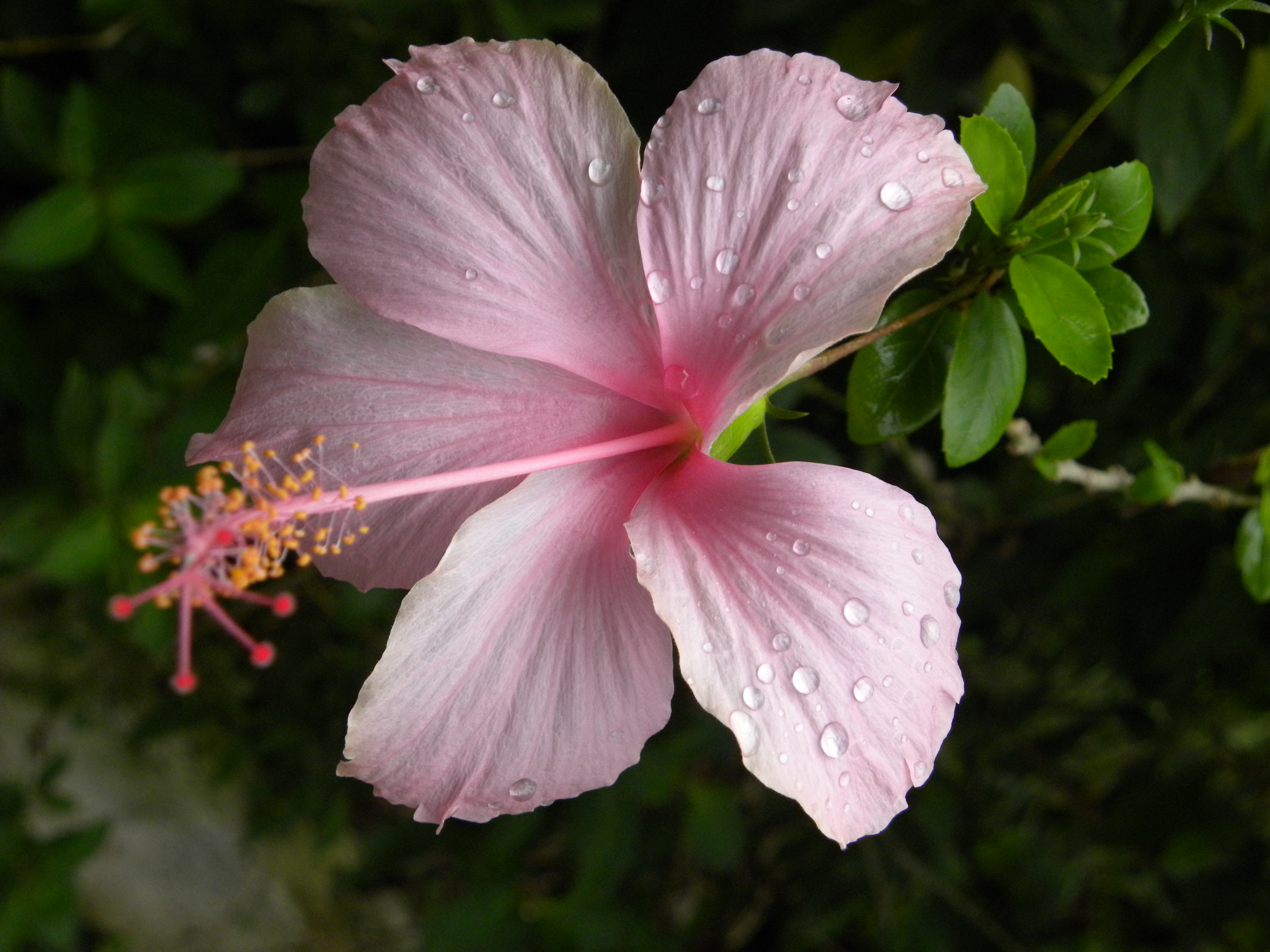
Pale rose-colored hibiscus

The first recorded use of rose as a color name in English was in 1382.

The etymology of the color name rose is the same as that of the name of the rose flower. The name originates from Latin rosa, borrowed through Oscan from colonial Greek in southern Italy: rhodon (Aeolic form: wrodon), from Aramaic wurrdā, from Assyrian wurtinnu, from Old Iranian *warda (cf. Avestan warda, Sogdian ward, Parthian wâr).

== In culture ==
Geography

- British historian John William Burgon famously described the Jordanian city of Petra as being colored rose, writing:

Match me such marvel save in Eastern clime,
A rose-red city – half as old as time!

- Marrakesh, Morocco is called the Rose City because many of its buildings are colored various tones of rose.
- Portland, Oregon is nicknamed "The Rose City" for the number of roses and rose gardens that thrive there.

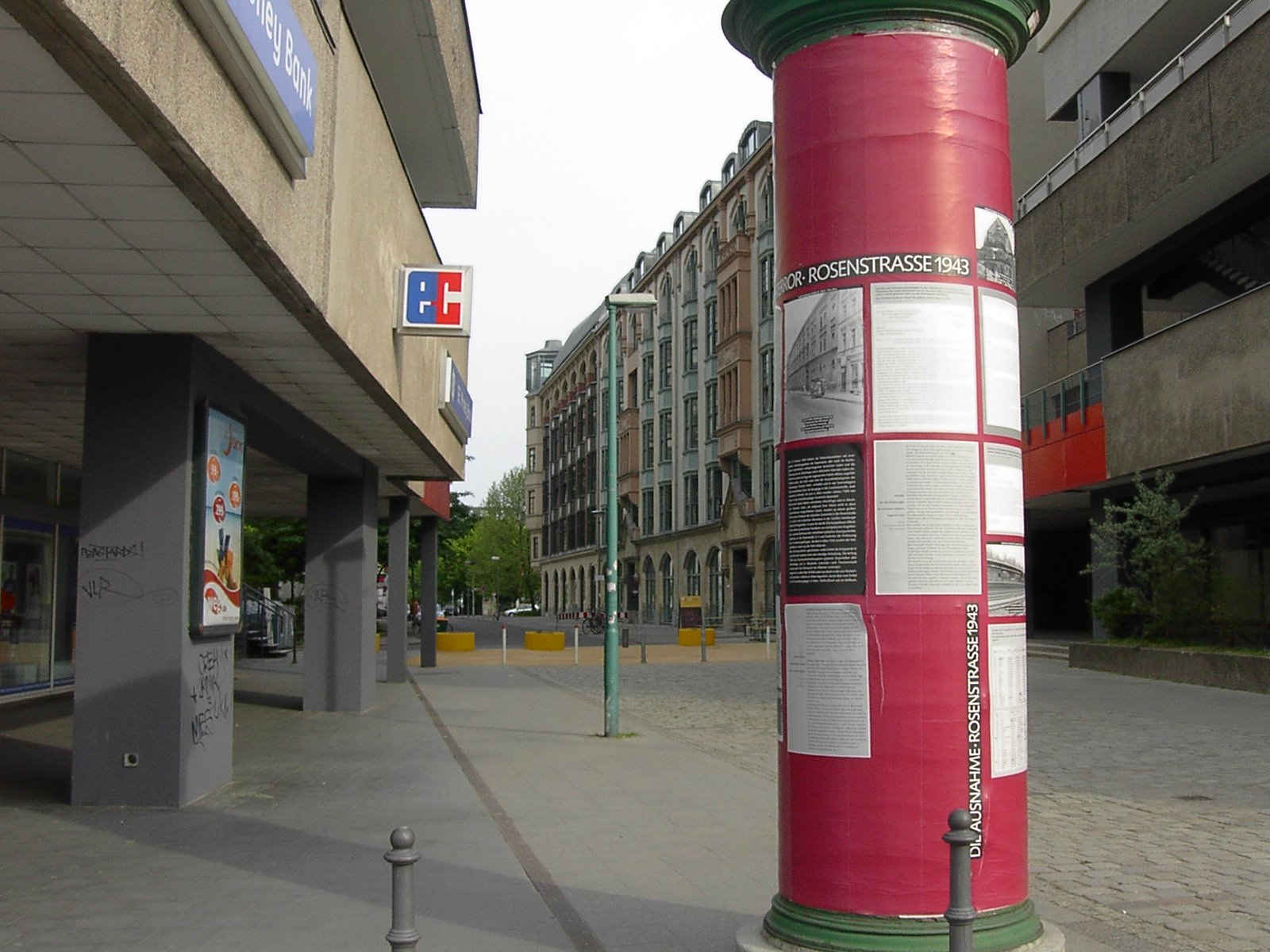
A rose-colored Litfaß column on the Rosenstrasse in Berlin today commemorates the Rosenstrasse protest (the building in which the detainees were held no longer exists).

Music

- "La Vie en rose" (French for "Life through rose-colored glasses", literally "Life in pink") was the signature song of French singer Édith Piaf. Piaf first popularized the song in 1946. It has been covered by many artists since.
- Rose Colored Glasses is the 1978 debut album by country singer-songwriter John Conlee.

Occult

- According to New Age author C. W. Leadbeater, who claimed to be clairvoyant, of the seven types of etheric atoms that he claimed to be able to observe with his third eye circulating through the human etheric body (colored violet, blue, green, yellow, orange, dark red, and rose), the flow of the rose colored etheric atoms (also called by Leadbeater the rose vitality globule) from the sun into the rainbow colored spleen chakra is the most important since all the other etheric atoms are derived from it and the rose colored atom vivifies the nervous system. Leadbeater also asserted that humans feel good around pine trees because they radiate more rose colored etheric atoms than any other plant.

Politics

- The revolution in which previous Georgian president Mikhail Saakashvili came to power in 2003 was called the "Rose Revolution"
- The color is used by the French Socialist Party

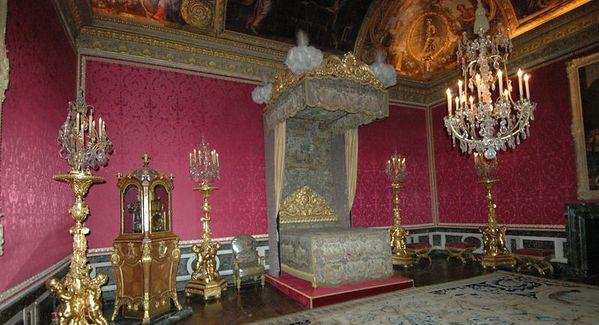
The Salon of Mercury is part of the Grand appartement du roi in the Versailles Palace and is decorated with rose colored wallpaper.

Religion

- In the Latin liturgical rites of the Catholic Church, priests may wear rose colored vestments on Gaudete Sunday (the third Sunday of Advent) and Laetare Sunday (the fourth Sunday of Lent).

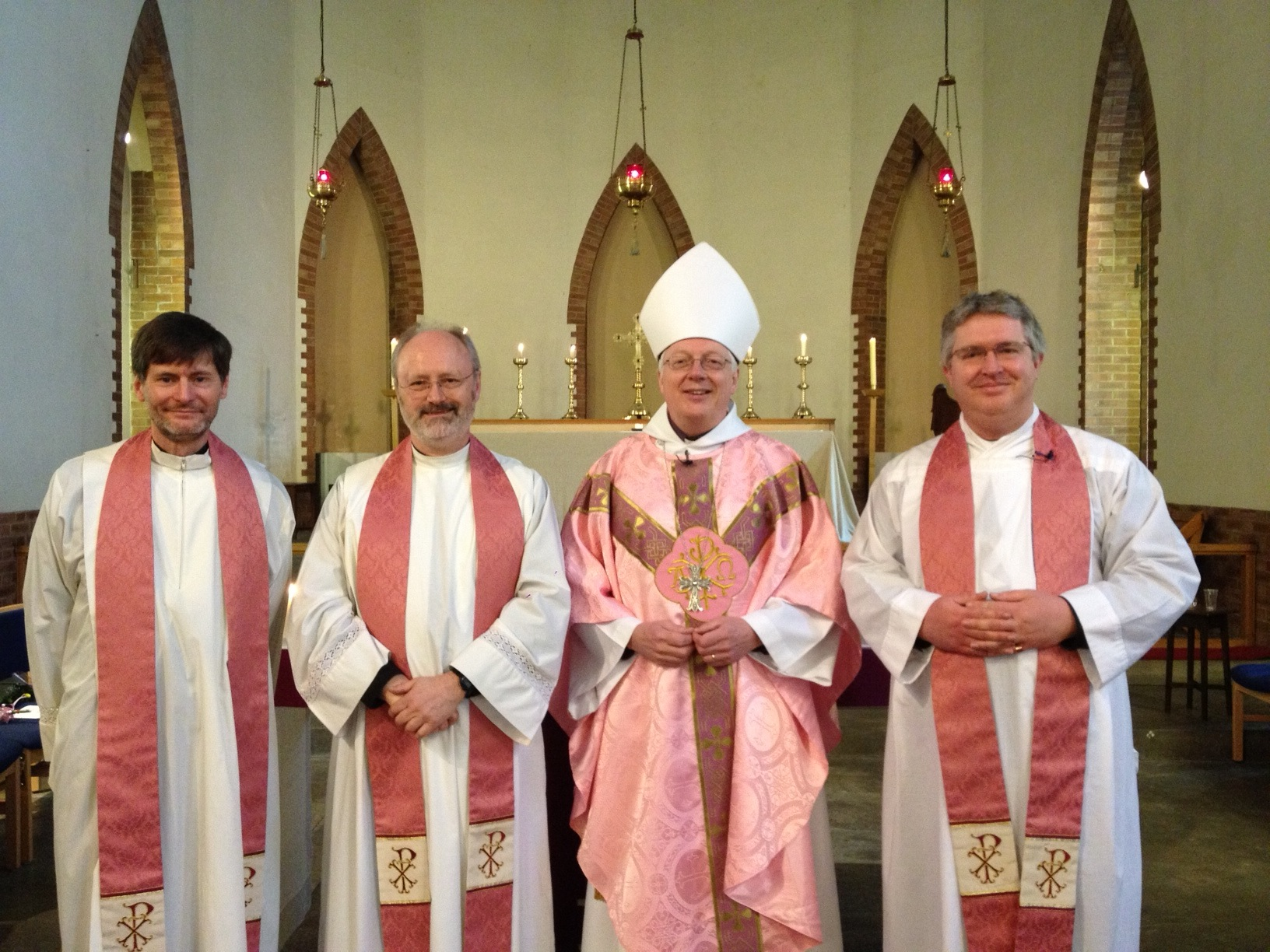
Anglican priests and bishop (center right) in rose vestments.

== See also ==
- Amaranth (color)
- Cerise (color)
- Fuchsia (color)
- Toulouse: "La Ville rose"
- RAL 3017 Rose
- Lists of colors
