= Janyse Jaud =

Canadian actress

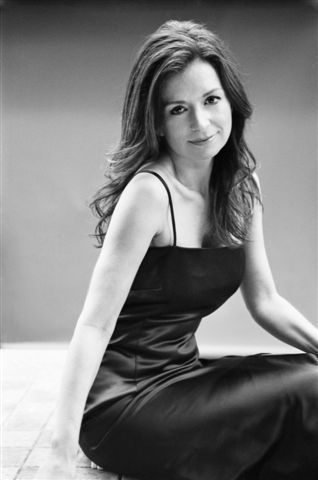
- Born: Kelowna, British Columbia, Canada
- Occupation: Actress
- Years active: 1992–present
- Spouse: Geby Jaud (divorced)
- Website: janysejaud.com

Janyse Jaud (/ˈdʒəniːs dʒɑːd/) is a Canadian actress. Her major voiceover roles include Hulk Vs, My Little Pony, Inuyasha, Ed Edd n Eddy, Batman: Black & White, Baby Looney Tunes, War Planets, Spider-Man Unlimited, and Strawberry Shortcake. She is also the narrator of the television series Adoption Stories.

== Early life ==
Jaud was born in Kelowna, British Columbia to June (née Laxdal), who was of Icelandic descent and Daniel Jaud, an accountant. At the age of five, she began training with the Canadian School of Ballet for eleven years. She also studied piano for six years with the Royal Conservatory of Music.

== Career ==
Jaud appeared on-camera in four television series The X-Files, The Outer Limits, Double Exposure, and Andromeda.

In 2004, Jaud narrated the Emmy Award-winning series Adoption Stories and traveled to New York for the event. But it was her voiceover work on the animated series Ed, Edd n Eddy that had the greatest impact. Jaud met children from the Make-A-Wish Foundation who faced life-threatening diseases. After this experience, she created 'The Magic of Think' and began writing books, music, nursery rhymes, and videos to help children develop strength and courage.

In 2008, Jaud released her first album in the Christmas music genre. She wrote songs with tongue-in-cheek humor. Some of these jazz songs have been chosen to be in films such as Blond and Blonder, American Mary, Debbie Macomber's Dashing Through the Snow, and Making Mr. Right. From 2010 to 2012, Jaud released several other singles.

== Filmography ==
=== Anime ===
- Broken Saints – Shandala Nisinu
- Cardcaptors – Natasha Avalon (Sakura's mother, Nadeshiko Kinomoto), Additional Voices
- Cybersix – Lori Anderson, Elaine, Griselda
- Dragon Ball Z – Social Worker and Chiko (Ocean Dub)
- Fatal Fury: The Motion Picture – Panni Shona
- Galaxy Express 999 - Metalmena
- Gin Tama – Tae Shimura
- Grey: Digital Target – Lala, Fan
- Hamtaro – Female Veterinarian (Episode 71, Uncredited)
- Highlander: The Search For Vengeance – Kyala
- Human Crossing – Delinquent, Kyoshi's Mother
- Inuyasha – Kagura, Kanna
- Inuyasha: The Final Act – Kagura, Kanna
- Kurozuka – Kuromitsu
- Maison Ikkoku – Akemi Roppongi
- MegaMan NT Warrior – Ms. Mari
- Mermaid's Scar (OVA) - Misa
- Monster Rancher – Mocchi, Pixie, Granity, Lilim, Poison, Lily
- Night Warriors: Darkstalkers' Revenge – Felicia
- Ogre Slayer – Akane, Isouko, Ryoko
- Please Save My Earth – Ayako Okamura
- Project ARMS: The Second Chapter – Keith Violet
- Ranma ½ – Hinako Ninomiya
- Saber Marionette – Bloodberry
- The Story of Saiunkoku – Kocho, Lady of the Night
- Shakugan no Shana – Margery Daw (Season 1)
- The Vision of Escaflowne – Eriya
- Zoids: Fuzors – Sabre, Venus

=== Animation ===
- Action Man – Asazi
- The Adventures of Corduroy – Lisa
- The Adventures of T-Rex – Additional Voices
- Alien Racers – Talanna
- Animated Classic Showcase – Various Characters
- Baby Looney Tunes – Melissa
- Barbie as the Princess and the Pauper – Palace Maid
- Batman Black and White (motion comics) – Harley Quinn, Martha Wayne, Catwoman, various voices
- Betsy Bubblegum's Journey Through Yummi-Land – Katie Cotton Candy
- Billy the Cat – Sabrina, Bonnie
- The Bots Master – Lady Frenzy
- Bratz Fashion Pixiez – Cymbeline
- A Chinese Ghost Story: The Tsui Hark Animation – Siu Lan
- Class of the Titans – Medelia, Stephanie
- Conan the Adventurer – Jezmine
- Doggie Daycare – Lula
- Dragon Tales – Eunice, Windy
- Ed, Edd n Eddy – Sarah, Lee Kanker
- Exosquad – Sgt. Rita Torres
- Fat Dog Mendoza – Additional Voices
- For Better or For Worse – Shawna-Marie, Sarah
- Gadget & the Gadgetinis – Sandy O'Nasty
- Galaxy Express 999 – Claire
- G.I. Joe Extreme – Tina, Computer Agent
- Hulk Vs – Lady Deathstrike, Hela
- Hurricanes – Miss Espanola
- The Kids from Room 402 – Melanie, Ms. Shiness
- Kishin Corps: Alien Defender Geo-Armor – Eva Braun, Maria Braun
- Kleo the Misfit Unicorn – Marcia, George
- Krypto the Superdog – Rosie, Daisy, Baby Cheetah
- Lapitch the Little Shoemaker – Yana, Marco, Melvin's Mother
- The Little Prince – Callisthea
- Littlest Pet Shop – Phoebe
- A Monkey's Tale – Kom's Mother
- Monster Mash – Spike, Mom
- ¡Mucha Lucha! – Dragonfly, Zebrina Twins
- My Little Pony (G3/G3.5 movies and specials) – Pinkie Pie, Scooter Sprite
- My Little Pony: Friendship Is Magic - Mrs. Trotsworth, Rainy Day
- Ogre Slayer – Akane, Isouko, Ryoko
- Once Upon a Tune – Bella
- ReBoot – Maxine
- Robin and the Dreamweavers – Flit
- RoboCop: Alpha Commando – Jennifer
- Roswell Conspiracies: Aliens, Myths and Legends – Sh'lainn Blaze
- Sabrina: The Animated Series – Leila Leigh, Bosley
- Salty's Lighthouse – Sophie, Sadie
- Shadow Raiders/War Planets – Jewelia
- Silent Mobius: The Motion Picture – Fuyaka Liquer
- Skysurfer Strike Force – Cerina, Sliced Ice/Kim
- Space Strikers – Dana
- Spider-Man Unlimited – Lizard Woman
- Strawberry Shortcake's Berry Bitty Adventures – Orange Blossom, Berrykin, Sadie
- Street Fighter – Celia, Mailei, Sachi
- Supernoobs – Additional Voices
- A Tale of Two Kitties – Aunt Lucy
- Tayo the Little Bus – Speedy
- Tom and Jerry Tales – Kitty
- Trouble Chocolate – Mint
- Trollz – Snarf
- Twisteeria – Loretta Fish, Batty
- Ultimate Book of Spells – Cassy
- The Wacky World of Tex Avery – Raquel, Tour Guide
- X-Men: Evolution – Taryn, Riley's Friend, Amy
- The Power of Animals – Tina Stone

=== Video games ===
- Cartoon Network Universe: FusionFall – Lee Kanker
- Devil Kings – Puff (English dub)
- Ed, Edd n Eddy: Jawbreakers – Sarah, Lee Kanker
- Ed, Edd n Eddy: The Mis-Edventures – Sarah, Lee Kanker
- Inuyasha: Feudal Combat – Kagura
- Inuyasha: The Secret of the Cursed Mask – Kagura (English dub)

=== Live-action ===
- Andromeda – Secretary, Voice Artist, Pax Magellanic Avatar (on camera) / Dawn, Clarion of Loss, Cavava (voice)
- Butterfly on a Wheel – Sarah (voice)
- Double Exposure – Wife
- The Karate Dog – Mary Beth (voice)
- The Outer Limits – Counselor (episode: "Beyond the Veil")
- The X-Files – Nurse (episode: "Pusher")

== Discography ==
=== Studio albums ===
- The Magic of Think (2008)
- The Magic of Christmas (2008)

=== Non-album singles ===
- "Dreamers" (2008)
- "I Had to Say Yes" (2010)
