= International Purple Hijab Day =

International day of awareness for domestic violence

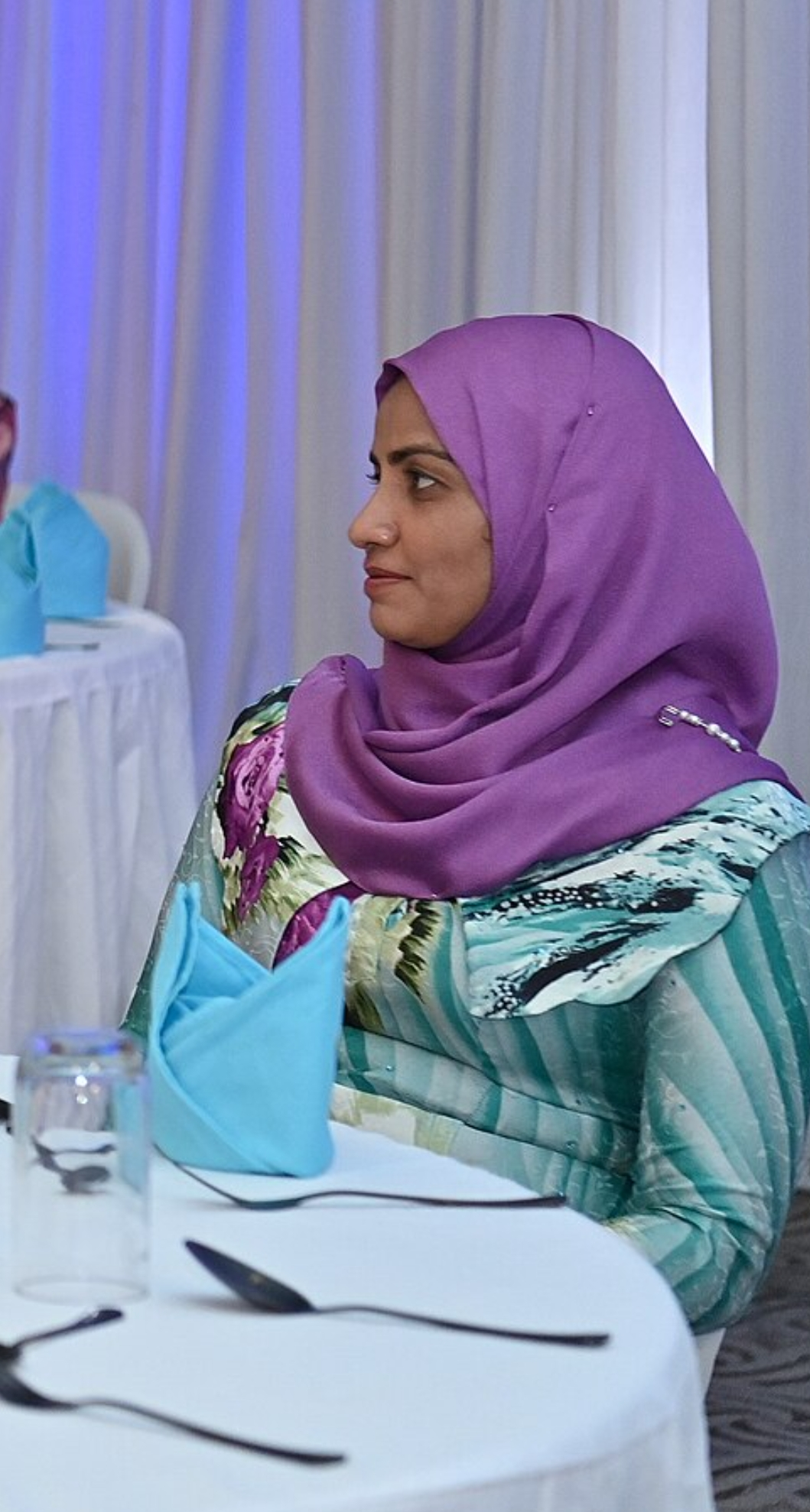
- A woman wearing a purple hijab in the Maldives
- Observed by: Muslims against domestic violence
- Type: Islam
- Date: Second Saturday in February
- 2025 date: February 8
- 2026 date: February 14
- 2027 date: February 13
- 2028 date: February 12
- Frequency: annual
- Related to: Global Pink Hijab Day

International Purple Hijab Day (sometimes known as Global Hijab Day or International Purple Hijab and Kufi Day) is an international day of remembrance for those who have experienced domestic violence. It is observed on the second Saturday each February. It is most often celebrated by Muslims, with women donning a purple hijab, but anyone may participate by wearing a purple item of clothing on the day such as a scarf, tie or kufi.

== Background ==
Many people believe that violence against women is allowed by Islam. The Baitul Salaam Network, a group that works with women who have faced domestic violence states that "one of the most ugly stereotypes is that Islam gives men the right to beat their wives." The Voice of Libyan Women, an organization that started Purple Hijab Day for the first time in Libya, state that this is a terrible misinterpretation and a deliberate misuse of religion. Instead, they say that Islam teaches "Muslims not to harm others." Sanaa Tariq, who organized an event in Edmonton, says that "Muslim women should not be regarded as oppressed" and that domestic violence is something that all groups of people care about.

== History ==
When Aasiya Zubair, a Muslim American co-founder of Bridges TV, was murdered by her husband, it came out that she had faced years of domestic violence from her husband. Her murder "led to dramatic changes in the way Muslim communities address domestic violence," said Aasiya Hadayai Majeed, who works the Baitul Salaam Network. Within days of Zubair's death, a grassroots effort began to speak out against domestic violence in the Muslim community. Zubair was murdered on February 12, 2009, and so Purple Hijab Day takes place each year near the date she died to remember her and the domestic violence she suffered.

The first Purple Hijab Day was celebrated on February 13, 2010. The color purple was chosen because the color purple "is associated with mourning." People who promote Purple Hijab Day stress that the day is about symbolism, but that "acting in unity will send a strong message for progress in our communities." The first year's events included workshops in Rhode Island, prayer vigils in Atlanta and a moment of silence.

== Events ==
Libya has celebrated by distributing a survey which could be taken anonymously and asked women about domestic violence. The results of the survey were taken to the Libyan prime minister.

Some groups, like the Islamic Cultural Centre of Ireland, chose to celebrate on a different day, Wednesday, and presented information and refreshments.

In 2015, Purple Hijab Day used the hashtags, #EndViolenceAgainstWomen, #PurpleHijabDay and #MuslimLivesMatter to spread awareness of the day.

== See also ==
- World Hijab Day
