= Honor killings in the United States =

Homicide to restore moral reputation

Several honor killings have been documented in the United States. As of 2012, there is no central agency that collects data across all jurisdictions in regards to honor violence in the United States. There is reluctance among some organizations to label events as honor killings to avoid stigmatizing Muslim and Arab cultures.

== Background ==
Around 2017, City University of New York John Jay College of Criminal Justice professor Ric Curtis led a team that analyzed honor killing statistics from Germany, the Netherlands, and the United Kingdom and made a proxy estimate for the United States based on that, resulting in an estimated 23–27 annual honor killings in the U.S. In 2017, Jesse Singal of New York Magazine wrote "there’s effectively no evidence that honor killings are common at all, according to one of the only (if not the only) studies attempting to estimate how prevalent that crime is." Executive Order 13769 "Protecting the Nation from Foreign Terrorist Entry into the United States" stated that the U.S. federal government would collect information on honor killings committed by foreigners resident in the U.S.

In 2012, Zuhdi Jasser of the think tank American Islamic Forum for Democracy argued that honor killings were a phenomenon in the U.S. that needs to be investigated. In 2015, senior fellow of Center for Advanced Studies on Terrorism, Farhana Qazi, stated that the actual number of honor killings was higher than the reported statistics due to a reluctance to embarrass relatives of the deceased.

In 2014, the research corporation Westat released a study on honor killings and violence entitled "Honor Violence Measurement Methods". The study was commissioned by the U.S. Department of Justice, and it identified four types of honor violence: honor killings, honor-based domestic violence, forced marriage, and female genital mutilation. The report estimated that 23–27 honor killings took place in the United States each year.

== Instances ==
=== Tina Isa ===
In 1989 in St. Louis, Missouri, sixteen-year-old Palestina (Tina) Isa was murdered by her Palestinian father, Zein Isa, with the aid of her Brazilian mother, Maria Isa. Their daughter listened to American popular music such as dance, rap, R&B, and rock. After learning that Palestina had taken a part-time job without her parents' permission, and dated an African American man, her father felt she had become too modernized. On the day of her murder, Zein repeatedly stabbed his daughter, while her mother Maria held her down. On December 20, 1991, both Zein and Maria Isa were convicted of first-degree murder and sentenced to death. Zein died from complications of diabetes on February 17, 1997. Maria Isa's death sentence was commuted to life imprisonment without parole; she died on April 30, 2014, in a Vandalia, Missouri, prison at the age of 70.

=== Amina and Sarah Said ===
Amina and Sarah Said were the children of an Egyptian immigrant father Yaser Abdel Said and a United States-born mother, Patricia "Tissie" Said (née Owens). Both girls were born in Dallas, Texas: Amina on March 2, 1989, and Sarah on March 16, 1990. The girls were found shot to death in a taxi at the Omni Mandalay Hotel in Irving, Texas, on January 1, 2008. Both girls had left their home in Lewisville, Texas, earlier that evening with their father. At 7:33 p.m., a call came into the Irving Police Department's 911 call center. The call was from Sarah Said; she had been shot nine times and told the operator, "My dad shot me and my sister. I'm dying!" Their mother, Patricia Said, claimed that both girls were killed for having non-Muslim boyfriends. Death threats had been made by Yaser against the girls. They ran away and were safe, but their mother brought them back.

Yaser Abdel Said was an FBI Ten Most Wanted Fugitive, and the FBI offered a $100,000 reward for information leading to his arrest. Said was featured on America's Most Wanted as well as on a Fox News special about honor killings in the United States. Said was captured at age 63 on August 26, 2020, after being on the run for more than a dozen years. Said was convicted in 2022 of capital murder and sentenced to life in prison without the possibility of parole.

=== Sandeela Kanwal ===
On 6 July 2008, Sandeela Kanwal was murdered by her father, Chaudhry Rashid, in what was widely considered an honor killing. Kanwal's father attempted to justify the honor killing using a common patriarchal pretext. Jamie Tarbay of NPR News reported that when authorities arrived at the crime scene, her father was very nonchalant concerning his actions.

=== Aasiya Zubair ===
In February 2009, Muzzammil Hassan was arrested and charged with murdering his estranged wife Aasiya Zubair with a knife. He was sentenced to 25 years to life in prison.

The Council on American-Islamic Relations and the Islamic Society of North America (ISNA) responded with an "Open Letter to Muslim Leaders", expressing shock and sadness at the murder, condemning domestic violence, and calling on imams and Muslim leaders to "provide support and help to protect the victims of domestic violence" and "to never second-guess a woman who comes to us indicating that she feels her life to be in danger." Imam Mohamed Hagmagid Ali, vice-president of ISNA, stated: "This is a wake up call to all of us, that violence against women is real and cannot be ignored. It must be addressed collectively by every member of our community."

=== Noor Almaleki ===
Faleh Hassan Almaleki, an Iraqi immigrant, used his vehicle to strike and kill his daughter Noor Almaleki (aged 20) in a Phoenix valley parking lot in October 2009. He also severely injured her boyfriend's mother, Amal Khalaf. Police said Almaleki told detectives and witnesses after the October 2009 incident that he was angry at his daughter because she was "too Westernized," defying Iraqi and Muslim values. Noor had shunned an arranged marriage to a first cousin in Iraq, and was living with her boyfriend and his mother, police said. Earlier, she had insisted on driving and crashed the family van. County prosecutor Laura Reckart said an enraged Almaleki hid in the parking lot waiting for her and her boyfriend's mother and then "revved and raced that car right into them." Following his daughter's death, Almaleki fled to Mexico and later to London, where he was taken into custody upon his arrival.

After four days of deliberation, the six-man, six-woman jury at Maricopa County Superior Court convicted him of second-degree murder. The jury also convicted him of aggravated assault for crashing his vehicle into Khalaf, and two further counts of hit-and-run. Subsequently, Almaleki was sentenced to 34 ½ years in prison.

=== Gelareh Bagherzadeh and Coty Beavers ===
Jordanian-American Ali Mahmood Awad Irsan was sentenced to death in a Texas court on August 14, 2018, for the murders of Gelareh Bagherzadeh and Coty Beavers in Greater Houston. Bagherzadeh, an Iranian-American, had encouraged Irsan's daughter Nesreen to renounce Islam and to convert to evangelical Christianity. Beavers, who was also an evangelical Christian, was Nesreen's husband.

== American Muslim community response ==
Leaders of the American Muslim community have condemned the practice. Members of the Council on American-Islamic Relations have condemned all honor killings as well as specific incidents. Many Muslim leaders in the US say that Islam does not promote honor killings and that the practice stems from sexism and tribal behavior that predates the religion. "You're always going to get problems with chauvinism and suppressing vulnerable populations and gender discrimination," says Salam Al-Marayati, executive director of the Muslim Public Affairs Council.

In February 2009, after the high-profile killing of Aasiya Zubair, Muslim leaders began a nationwide, unified effort entitled "Imams Speak Out: Domestic Violence Will Not Be Tolerated in Our Communities," asking all imams and religious leaders to discuss domestic violence in their weekly sermon or their Friday prayer services. The group, "Muslim Men Against Domestic Violence", was founded soon after the murder.

== See also ==
- Blood atonement, comparable historical practice among fundamentalist Mormons in the United States
- Namus
- Outline of domestic violence
