= Bridges TV =

Muslim television network in the United States

- Country: United States
- Broadcast area: National
- Headquarters: Buffalo, New York

Programming
- Language: American English

History
- Launched: November 15, 2004
- Closed: March 15, 2012

Bridges TV was a Muslim television network in the United States. It was originally headquartered in Buffalo, New York. Premiering nationally on November 15, 2004, it was the first American Muslim television network to broadcast in the English language. The channel ceased operations March 15, 2012.

Designed to counter negative stereotypes of Muslims, the network received attention from publications and media venues such as Variety, NBC News, the Voice of America, Columbus Dispatch, Detroit Free Press, San Jose Mercury News, Rochester Democrat & Chronicle, The Buffalo News and Canadian Press.

In July 2011, Bridges TV moved to New York City in hopes of broadening its influence across America with help from Soundview Broadcasting. The move crippled the company and was only meant for Soundview to absorb Bridges TV's customers and its small influence in the Muslim American Market. The channel suffered a setback when its founder beheaded his estranged wife.

== Content ==
By focusing its content on the experiences of the estimated eight million Muslims living in North America, Bridges TV differentiates itself from such foreign language programming as Geo TV (which broadcasts in Urdu), Prime TV (which broadcasts in Urdu) and Arab Radio and Television Network (which broadcasts in Arabic). Around the time of its inception, the network announced that it would seek to feature sitcoms that represent American Muslim family life in a positive way and identified The Cosby Show as a model for such programming.

In late 2005, Bridges TV started airing "Current Issues", a show produced in Lafayette, Louisiana about Palestinian and other Middle Eastern concerns. The Palestinian American host, Hesham Tillawi, is known for vocalizing criticism against Israel's treatment of Arabs and Muslims. The Anti-Defamation League called his show "a megaphone for Holocaust deniers and white supremacists seeking to broadcast their hatred and anti-Semitism into American homes with a "who's who" of notable American antisemites including David Duke, Willis Carto, Edgar J. Steele, Mark Weber, and Bradley Smith.

Another program shown on Bridges TV, "American Pilgrimage", featured Rabbi Brad Hirschfield visiting homes and mosques of leading imams and Muslim religious thinkers across North America in cities including Halifax, Detroit, San Francisco, New York City and Washington, D.C. The series has been described as "groundbreaking" and has been characterized as having a "Charlie Rose meets Charles Kuralt" format.

World heavyweight champion Muhammad Ali, a subscriber and spokesperson for the network, said: "Bridges TV gives American Muslims a voice of their own on the airwaves for Americans of all races and religions to hear." Network official expressed the opinion that a channel like Bridges TV was long overdue and market research sponsored by the network revealed American Muslims' willingness to pay as much as $10 per month above and beyond their current cable television or satellite television fee for the channel.

== Leadership ==
Muzzammil S. Hassan, founder and CEO of Bridges TV, expressed belief "that moderate Muslims cannot identify with the extreme stereotypes often depicted in Hollywood productions" and said "They think they are not accurately portrayed...Bridges TV gives American Muslims a voice and will depict them in everyday, real life situations." Hassan also said he hoped the Bridges TV network would balance negative portrayals of Muslims following the attacks on September 11, 2001.

== Murder ==
In February 2009, Hassan was arrested and charged with beheading his estranged wife Aasiya Zubair who also worked for Bridges TV. Her decapitated body was found at the TV station. Dr. Khalid Qazi, president of the Muslim Public Affairs Council of Western New York and a friend of the couple, said that Hassan "was worried about the station's future...He was stressed" and added "Domestic violence is despicable, and Islam condones it in no way whatever." Shortly after the arrest of Muzzammil Hassan, Bridges TV posted the following notice on their website:

Bridges TV is deeply shocked and saddened by the murder of Aasiya [Zubair] Hassan and subsequent arrest of Muzzammil Hassan. Our deepest condolences and prayers go out to the families of the victim. We request that their right to privacy be respected.

In the aftermath of Aasiya Zubair Hassan's death, Bridges TV shut down its news operations for three months, although it continued to present other programming. The news operation later resumed, and the network continued to operate, although on a smaller scale than previously projected. As of May 2010, the network reported that it was carried in 4 million homes in two dozen markets. Hassan was convicted in February 2011 of second-degree murder.
