= Voice of Libyan Women =

Libyan non-governmental organization

The Voice of Libyan Women
- Abbreviation: VLW
- Founder: Alaa Murabit
- Key people: Alaa Murabit, Kholoud Htewash, Najat Dau, Ahmed AlShaibi, Nadia El Fallah, Sara Barka, Salsabil Zantouti, Khalifa El Sherif, Haneen Khalid.
- Volunteers: 600
- Website: vlwlibya.org | noor.vlwlibya.org

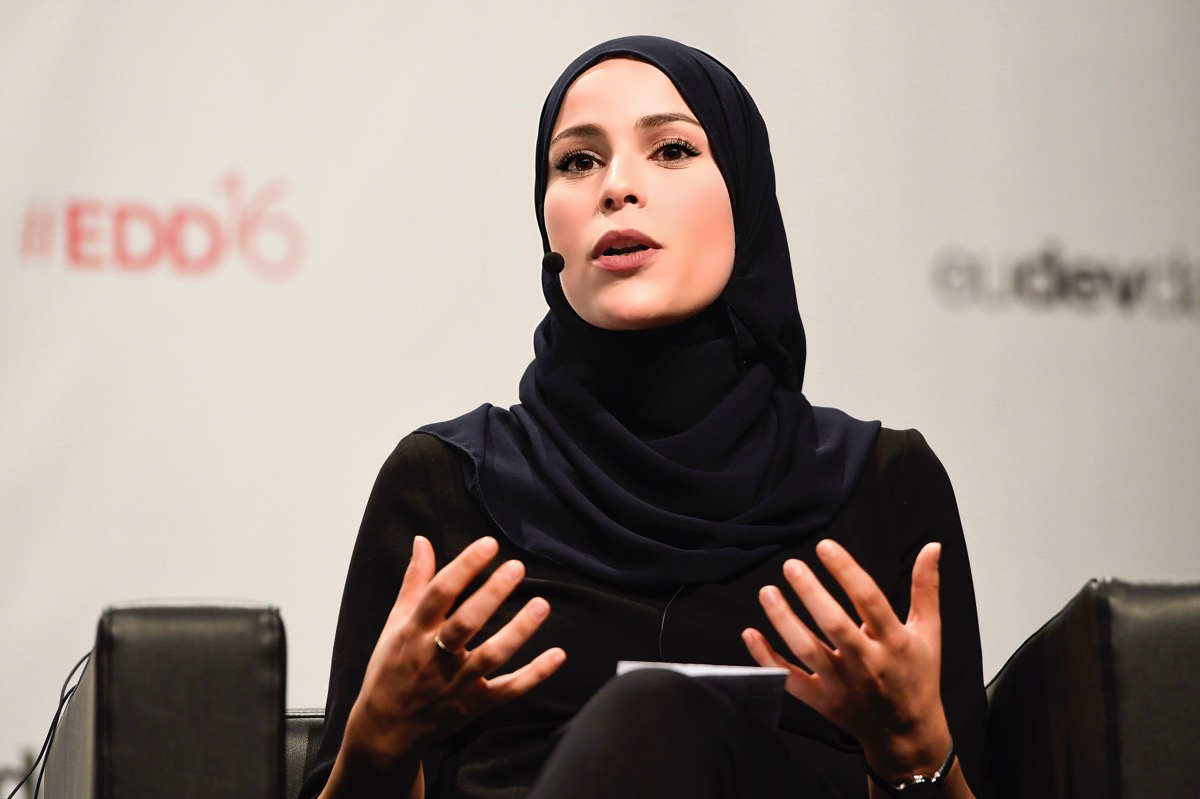
Founder Dr. Alaa Murabit at the European Development Days 2016

The Voice of Libyan Women (VLW) is a non-governmental organization (NGO) founded in order to advance and protect women's rights in Libya. VLW is headquartered in Tripoli and has branch offices in Zawia and Misrata. VLW is still very much a youth-led organization which continues to advocate for women's development and to challenge the prevailing norms of Libyan society. VLW works to spread information at a national level by creating local teams made up both of individuals and organizations.

== History ==
The VLW was founded in August 2011 in response to the February 17 Libyan revolution. It was founded in Tripoli by Alaa Murabit, a young doctor and women's rights activist. Murabit was in her last year of medical school and after the revolution, she felt that there was a "window of opportunity for women in Libya." By November, the group had organized the first-ever International Women's Conference in Libya. Also, within a very short amount of time, the VLW had created a women's center in Tripoli and was offering classes.

Murabit shared that VLW attempted to use "proven international models" for their group, but found only closed doors in conservative, largely Sunni Arab populated Libya. By modifying their approach and using peaceful interpretations of Islam in their work, they found a greater voice among both men and women. VLW's approach, using religion to "gain local-level support," has been a unique way to enact change in Libya.

== Projects and programs ==
=== One Voice ===
One Voice, which took place November 11–15, 2011 was organized by VLW and was the first International Women's Conference ever held in Libya. The conference included topics on politics, religion, economics and had a final, closed session for women-only on topics such as women's health and gender-based violence.

=== Project Noor ===
Project Noor, which also means "light" in Arabic, is a program that seeks to raise awareness of domestic violence and sexual abuse of women in Libya. It is a media campaign which uses billboards, radio, television and social media to spread its message. Project Noor is unique in that it seeks to address ideas surrounding these issues by using religious language in a predominantly Muslim country. VLW seeks to reach out to these religious areas in Libya and correct the "misunderstanding and misrepresentation of Islamic teachings" which have eroded women's rights in the Middle East. Project Noor uses Islamic teachings against violence, especially those interpretations of the Quran that emphasize the equality of women to men.

Nadia El-Fallah helped start Project Noor in 2013, and hopes that it can be a "tool for sparking conversations in people's homes, mosques, (and) coffee shops." Palestine and Jordan have both requested VLW to replicate Project Noor in their respective countries.

=== International Purple Hijab Day ===
International Purple Hijab Day is an event in where women wear a purple hijab to show a "reminder of Islam's strict stance against domestic violence." Murabit states that "Purple Hijab Day directly contests a Muslim's falsely perceived right to abuse a wife, daughter, mother, or sister." The first Purple Hijab Day in Libya was in 2012 and the 2013 event saw 13,000 Libyans involved. The date of Purple Hijab Day (the second Saturday in February) occurs in order to remember the murder of Aasiya Zubair, who was a female architect found stabbed and beheaded by her abusive husband Muzzammill Hassan. Men and those who do not wear hijabs are encouraged to wear a purple scarf, tie or ribbon on Purple Hijab Day.
