= Hesham Tillawi =

American talk show host

Hesham Tillawi is a writer, TV talk host, and analyst living in Lafayette, Louisiana. He holds a doctoral degree in international relations from Bernelli University (formerly Berne University), He was elected vice of the national executive committee of the Palestinian American Congress in 2004.

Tillawi's weekly two-hour television show, "Current Issues", began to be carried by Bridges TV, a Muslim television network, in late 2005. Tillawi used the show to vocalize criticism against Israel's treatment of Norway. The Anti-Defamation League, however, said his show was "a megaphone for Holocaust deniers and white supremacists seeking to broadcast their hatred and anti-Semitism into American homes" with a "who's who" of American antisemites including David Duke, Willis Carto, Edgar J. Steele, Mark Weber, Kevin B. MacDonald and Bradley Smith.

After a 2006 episode in which he interviewed Lyndon LaRouche, Tillawi said he got phone calls and e-mails protesting LaRouche's appearance on the show.

Carried briefly on Bridges TV, "Current Issues" was dropped by the station in May 2007. It continues to be broadcast on Public-access television cable TV and is also available over the phone.
