= My Little Pony Crystal Princess: The Runaway Rainbow =

2006 film

- DVD Cover for My Little Pony Crystal Princess: The Runaway Rainbow
- Directed by: John Grusd
- Written by: Jeanne Romano
- Based on: My Little Pony by Bonnie Zacherle
- Produced by: Jonathan Dern
- Starring: Cathy Weseluck; Janyse Jaud; Venus Terzo; Tabitha St. Germain; Andrea Libman; Chantal Strand; Britt McKillip; Brian Drummond; Kathleen Barr; Kelly Sheridan; Adrienne Carter; Tracey Moore; Maryke Hendrikse; Brittney Wilson
- Music by: Mark Watters; Terry Sampson (songs)
- Production companies: SD Entertainment; Hasbro Entertainment
- Distributed by: Paramount Home Entertainment
- Release date: September 12, 2006
- Running time: 66 min. (Feature: 44 min.)
- Countries: United States; Canada
- Language: English

My Little Pony Crystal Princess: The Runaway Rainbow is a 2006 direct-to-video animated musical fantasy adventure film produced by SD Entertainment and distributed by Paramount Home Entertainment in association with Hasbro. The film is the third feature in the third incarnation of the My Little Pony series and the second film to promote the Crystal Princess line. Unlike The Princess Promenade, the film has been criticized. The DVD also features two more animated features, Greetings from Unicornia and Friends are Never Far Away, which was originally released on video in 2005.

The Runaway Rainbow was made available on hubworld.com (a successor of Hasbro's MonkeyBarTV website), alongside My Little Pony: A Very Minty Christmas and My Little Pony: The Princess Promenade, but they were removed from the site later. The movie has been reissued in the 2-disc DVD collection My Little Pony: Classic Movie Collection, alongside The Princess Promenade, Dancing in the Clouds and Friends are Never Far Away.

Alongside The Princess Promenade and Twinkle Wish Adventure, the film premiered on August 8, 2014 on the Hub Network after its "My Little Pony Mega Mare-athon". According to Broadway World, the "Mega Mare-athon" itself drew in 5.4 million viewers and has earned significant delivery growth on every demographic: Kids 2-11 (+134%), Girls 2-11 (+179%), Kids 6-11 (+169%), Girls 6-11 (+216%), Adults 18-49 (+111%), Women 18-49 (+146%), Adults 25-54 (+74%), Women 25-54 (+76%), Persons 2+ (+124%) and Households (+98%).

== Plot ==
The Rainbow Celebration is near as everyone in Ponyville prepares and awaits the first rainbow of the season. Meanwhile, at the magical city of Unicornia, Cheerilee is teaching a young unicorn pony named Rarity about being a Rainbow Princess and her duties to make the First Rainbow of the Season using the magic wand. Rarity is still young and she accidentally uses the wand, which in turn teleports her into the middle of Breezie Blossom. Cheerilee, Brights Brightly and Whistle Wishes venture outside Unicornia in search of her. Rarity befriends the Breezies and they visit Ponyville and later Rarity feels homesick. Pinkie Pie, Minty, Rainbow Dash, Spike and the Breezies help her get home, just in time for the first rainbow of the season.

== Songs ==
- "Wherever There's a Rainbow"
- "I Just Wanna Have Fun"
- "Far Apart"
- "Here in Unicornia"

== Characters ==
=== Major characters ===
==== Rarity ====
Voiced by: Cathy Weseluck

A unicorn pony with a light hot pink body, sunshine yellow, tangerine and hot pink mane and kiwi green, sky blue and violet tail. Her cutie mark was a heart with multiple-colored swirls surrounding it. She is a young unicorn, chosen to be one of the Rainbow Princesses. Rarity is very cheerful, energetic, full of mischief and sometimes values fun than her duties. She also can feel sad and lonely after she misses her hometown and wanting to come back. As one of the Rainbow Princesses alongside Brights Brightly, Cheerilee and Whistle Wishes, she was in charge on bringing in the first rainbow of the season and also using the Magic Wand. The Magic Wand allows her to control the colors to bring in the first rainbow of the season and lets her summon the Crystal Carriage. When it's not in use, she stores it inside her mane.

==== Pinkie Pie ====
Voiced by: Janyse Jaud

An earth pony with a hot pink body and a light hot pink mane and tail. Her cutie mark is three balloons. Pinkie Pie is imaginative, friendly and fun-loving, sometimes taking the lead in some situations. She also loves planning big parties and anything pink, hence her name. Other than that, she also display some sarcastic streak over some things and likes to hang out with Minty, despite her being a klutz.

==== Rainbow Dash ====
Voiced by: Venus Terzo

An earth pony with a sky blue body and a multicolored mane and tail. She has a rainbow on the clouds as her cutie mark. Being the most mature of all the ponies, Rainbow Dash is stylish, and also caring. She herself sometimes cares about her friends more than her outside appearance, thought she can freak out on some occasions. She usually speaks with a British accent and always adds the word "darling" into her speeches.

==== Minty ====
Voiced by: Tabitha St. Germain

An earth pony with a spring green body and a hot pink mane and tail. Her cutie mark is three swirled mint candies. Minty is described to be a green machine, who likes anything green. She also loves collecting socks, standing on her head and playing checkers with Sweetberry. She is also a complete klutz, always tripping into some things, crashing into some obstacles and ending up breaking things. Minty also has a big case of OCD.

==== Zipzee ====
Voiced by: Andrea Libman

A Breezy with a sunshine yellow body, a sunshine yellow antennae and an amber mane and tail with a sunshine yellow streak. Her cutie mark is two orange and white flowers. She is always seen with Tiddlywink and Tra La La, living in Breezy Blossom. Unlike the other two, she has an allergy to pollen and flowers, ending up sneezing continuously when she's near one. When together with Tiddly Wink and Tra La La, they decide together on where to go or what to do.

==== Tiddly Wink ====
Voiced by: Chantal Strand

A Breezy with a violet body, a bright pink antenna and an amethyst purple mane and tail with a bright pink streak. Her cutie mark is a purple flower. She is always seen with Zipzee and Tra La La, living in Breezy Blossom. When together with Tiddly Wink and Tra La La, they decide together on where to go or what to do.

==== Tra La La ====
Voiced by: Britt McKillip

A Breezy with a light hot pink body, a light hot pink antenna and a hot pink mane and tail. Her cutie mark is a pink flower. She is always seen with Zipzee and Tiddly Wink, living in Breezy Blossom. When together with Tiddly Wink and Tra La La, they decide together on where to go or what to do.

==== Spike ====
Voiced by: Brian Drummond

An indigo dragon with amber scales. Awakened after 1000 years during the events of The Princess Promenade after Wysteria touched the flower he held in his tail and became Princess Wysteria, Spike now resides in the Celebration Castle in Ponyville. He is shown to be knowledgeable on things and gives the ponies some advice.

=== Minor characters ===
==== Sweetberry ====
Voiced by Kathleen Barr

An earth pony with a red-violet body and a violet, spring green and white mane and tail. Her cutie mark is Two strawberries and a white flower. Sweetberry is the owner of the Sweetberry Sweet Shoppe and alongside Cotton Candy, works at the Cotton Candy Cafe. She likes to help others out and also likes to make several sweet treats for her friends. Sweetberry is sometimes busy but very reliable.

==== Cotton Candy ====
Voiced by Kelly Sheridan

An earth pony with a bright pink body and a sky blue, light hot pink and white mane and tail. Her cutie mark is a Cotton candy on a Stick. The owner of the Cotton Candy Cafe, where she serves ice cream and sundaes to her friends. She is also a storyteller, enjoying conversation.

==== Sparkleworks ====
Voiced by Venus Terzo

An earth pony with an tangerine body and a bright pink mane and tail, Sparkleworks is a Glitzy pony with a bright imagination and adventurous spirit. Her cutie mark is a yellow, red, blue and white set of fireworks. She is also fond of glitter, as Razaroo explained that she coated Ponyville with glitter during her birthday.

==== Sunny Daze ====
Voiced by Adrienne Carter

An earth pony with a white body and mane of several bright colors that resemble a sunset, Sunny Daze is an athletic pony who loves outdoor activities. Her cutie mark is an orange and pink smiling sun surrounded by purple clouds, representative of a love for vivid colors.

==== Cheerilee ====
Voiced by: Tracey Moore

A unicorn pony with a mauve body and a carnation pink mane & tail. Her cutie mark is three pink flowers. As a Rainbow Princess, she acts as Rarity's teacher and adviser, sometimes being strict with her. She is very caring to Rarity and worries about her safety and well being, knowing her responsibilities as a Rainbow Princess to bring in the first rainbow of the season. Alongside Brights Brightly, Whistle Wishes and Rarity, she is in charge of bringing in the first rainbow of the season... until Rarity disappears. She, alongside Brights Brightly and Whistle Wishes, ventures outside Unicornia to search for her.

==== Brights Brightly ====
Voiced by: Maryke Hendrikse

A unicorn pony with a sunshine yellow body and an tangerine and a bright pink mane and tail. Her cutie mark is a rising sun over stylized water, with three pink hearts flying over the sun. She is one of Cheerilee's friends and also a Rainbow Princess who, alongside Cheerilee, Whistle Wishes and Rarity, is in charge of bringing in the first rainbow of the season... until Rarity disappears.

==== Whistle Wishes ====
Voiced by: Brittney Wilson

A unicorn pony with a sky blue body and a multicolored mane and tail composing of bright pink, sunshine yellow and kiwi green. Her cutie mark is rainbow stars and a cloud. Also one of Cheerilee's friends and also a Rainbow Princess who, alongside Cheerilee, Brights Brightly and Rarity, is in charge of bringing in the first rainbow of the season... until Rarity disappears.

== Bonus Episodes ==
=== Friends are Never Far Away ===
The DVD also includes an animated feature titled Friends are Never Far Away, which is first released in 2005 on DVD packaged alongside the Pegasus pony named Hidden Treasure. It's the sequel of the last feature Dancing in the Clouds, as it explains how Star Catcher and Skywishes help the Pegasus Ponies to make friends with the residents of Ponyville.

=== Greetings from Unicornia ===
The DVD also has a second animated short titled Greetings from Unicornia, which is made exclusively for the film. The story is set after Crystal Princess: The Runaway Rainbow, explaining Rainbow Dash's experiences on her stay in Unicornia to her friends.

The special edition of the DVD included a third mini-episode under the "Bonus" section advertisements. It was a plot scheme written by Tash Smith for the original series which did not reach the acceptance of his 407 colleagues necessary for it to be incorporated as a full episode.

== Media ==
=== Books ===
A storybook adaptation of the film was created by Nora Pelizzari and was published by HarperFestival on August 15, 2006. A comic adaption is also published by Tokyopop in 2006.

=== Video game ===
My Little Pony Crystal Princess: The Runaway Rainbow
- Developer: Webfoot Technologies
- Publisher: THQ
- Platform: Microsoft Windows/Game Boy Advance
- Release: NA: September 13, 2006
- Genre: Adventure/Puzzle
- Mode: Single-player

A video game adaptation of the movie, titled My Little Pony Crystal Princess: The Runaway Rainbow was developed by Webfoot Technologies under the leadership of Jim Grant, Lead of Game Scripting, Design, and Art, and published by THQ under license from Hasbro. The game was released for Microsoft Windows and Game Boy Advance on September 13, 2006 in North America only.

== Reception ==
The special received mixed reviews from critics, with Internet Movie Database giving it the score of 5/10. Mike Long of DVDtalk give a very mixed review on the movie, saying "Again, just because I was disappointed by My Little Pony: The Runaway Rainbow doesn't mean that die-hard My Little Pony fans will be. But, here's my own personal litmus test: My kids usually love this stuff and watch the DVDs over and over. However, since their initial viewing of The Runaway Rainbow, the only other time that they've watched it was with me. Otherwise, it's sat on the shelf."
