= Thomas Yuen =

American computer businessman (1951–2022)

- Born: September 10, 1951 (age 75); Yangzhou, China
- Died: February 13, 2022

Thomas C. K. Yuen (September 10, 1951 – February 13, 2022) was an American executive. A co-founder of AST Research, Yuen was one of the early proponents of the personal computer.

== Early life ==
Yuen was born on September 10, 1951, in Yangzhou, China. His father was a housekeeper and chauffeur who took his family to Hong Kong to follow his employer.

In 1970, Yuen immigrated to the United States and attended community college before transferring to University of California, Irvine to study electrical engineering. In 1974, he received a bachelor’s degree in electrical engineering from UC Irvine’s Henry Samueli School of Engineering.

== Career ==
In 1973, he was diagnosed with a kidney disease that would require costly treatment. At the time, Yuen was working as an engineer at Hughes Aircraft, earning a modest salary of $12,000 a year. He started to consider launching his own business.

In 1980, Yuen experienced kidney failure and learned that he would need dialysis treatment for the rest of his life.

The same year, he co-founded AST Research, a hardware technology maker, with two other immigrant engineers, Albert Wong and Safi Qureshey. The company, which initially produced expansion cards for IBM’s personal computers, became a leading maker of IBM-compatible personal computers and grew into a Fortune 500 company, with revenues of $1.14 billion in 1992.

In 1992, Yuen left AST and invested $2.7 million into SRS Lab, an audio technology licenser. As Chief executive of the company, Yuen pushed the company to specialize into three-dimensional audio technology. In 2012, the company was purchased by DTS Inc., another sound licenser, for $148 million.

Yuen spent the final decades of his life funding and promoting stem-cell therapy research, hoping that it would help address chronic diseases like the one from which he was suffering. He created his own company, R&D firm, PrimeGen Biotech, and donated to the University of California at Irvine’s stem research department.
