= World Hijab Day =

Annual awareness event on 1 February

- World Hijab Day poster from 2016
- Date: 1 February
- Frequency: Annual
- Established: 2013
- Founder: Nazma Khan
- Website: worldhijabday.com

World Hijab Day is an annual event founded by Nazma Khan in 2013, taking place on 1 February each year in 140 countries worldwide. Its stated purpose is to encourage women of all religions and backgrounds to wear and experience the hijab for a day and to educate and spread awareness on why hijab is worn. Nazma Khan said her goal was also to promote wider acceptance of hijab wearing as well as combating religious discrimination.

== Background ==
The hijab is a type of head covering worn by many Muslim women as a sign of modesty. Hijab comes in various forms.

Hijab-wearing Muslim women face both overt and covert discrimination in job applications and workplace environments, with covert bias often resulting in more hostile treatment.

Nazma Khan, a Bangladeshi-American, launched World Hijab Day (WHD) in 2013. She said that her aim was "to raise awareness and normalize the wearing of a hijab." Khan added that she launched the day due hoping for "foster[ing] religious tolerance" given experiences of facing "discrimination and bullying in school and university by being spat on, chased, kicked and called a “terrorist”." This way, other women would not have the same experiences as "she had to endure."

Laws like Quebec's Bill 21, which bans public sectors from wearing religious symbols, was a factor in the creation of World Hijab Day.

== Official recognition ==
In 2017, New York State recognized World Hijab Day. An event marking the day was hosted at the House of Commons of the United Kingdom, which was attended by Theresa May (a former UK prime minister). The House of Representatives of the Philippines approved 1 February as "annual national hijab day" 2021.

== Criticism ==
A. J. Caschetta criticizes the choice of February 1 for World Hijab Day as distasteful, arguing that it coincides with Ayatollah Ruhollah Khomeini's 1979 return to Iran from exile to lead the Iranian revolution and its enforcement of mandatory hijab laws. Caschetta argues that while the hijab is promoted in the West as a symbol of the right to choose one's clothing, the same advocacy is lacking for women who are persecuted for refusing to wear the hijab.

Maryam Namazie, a vocal ex-Muslim and campaigner, criticized World Hijab Day, arguing that it is a "form of oppression". In his own opinion piece published in 2017, Maajid Nawaz suggested that the name be changed to "Hijab is a Choice Day".

In 2018, Canadian activist Yasmine Mohammed started a #NoHijabDay campaign in response, World Hijab Day, framing it as a way to highlight women who have resisted societal pressure and state mandates to remove the hijab.

== Social media ==
World Hijab Day has largely been promoted through social media. Campaigners promote the day with hashtags such as #EmpoweredinHijab.

== See also ==
- Women in Islam
- Global Pink Hijab Day
- International Purple Hijab Day
- Head covering for Christian women
- Head covering for Jewish women
- List of female Islamic scholars
- Islamic feminist views on dress codes
- Haya Day
- International Day To Combat Islamophobia

== Bibliography ==
- Rahbari, L., Dierickx, S., Coene, G., & Longman, C. (2021). Transnational Solidarity with Which Muslim Women? The Case of the My Stealthy Freedom and World Hijab Day Campaigns. Politics & Gender, 17(1), 112–135. doi:10.1017/S1743923X19000552
- Raihanah, M. M. (2017). " ‘World Hijab Day’: Positioning the Hijabi in Cyberspace". In Seen and Unseen. Leiden, The Netherlands: Brill. doi: https://doi.org/10.1163/9789004357013_007
- Rahbari, Ladan (2021), In Her Shoes: Transnational Digital Solidarity With Muslim Women, or the Hijab?. Tijds. voor econ. en Soc. Geog., 112: 107–120. https://doi.org/10.1111/tesg.12376
- Shirazi, Faegheh. 2019. "The Veiling Issue in 20th Century Iran in Fashion and Society, Religion, and Government" Religions 10, no. 8: 461. https://doi.org/10.3390/rel10080461
- Oren, Elizabeth. “Culture in a Murky World: Hijab Trends in Jihadi Popular Culture.” The Cyber Defense Review, vol. 3, no. 3, Army Cyber Institute, 2018, pp. 83–92, JSTOR 26554999
- Anouar El Younssi (2018) Maajid Nawaz, Irshad Manji, and the Call for a Muslim Reformation, Politics, Religion & Ideology, 19:3, 305–325, doi:10.1080/21567689.2018.1524327
- Ghumkhor Sahar . (2020) The Confessional Body. In: The Political Psychology of the Veil. Palgrave Studies in Political Psychology. Palgrave Macmillan, Cham. https://doi.org/10.1007/978-3-030-32061-4_6
