= Khalid Qazi =

Khalid Qazi is an internist and former residency program director at Sisters of Charity Hospital, Buffalo, New York and president of the Muslim Public Affairs Council of Western New York. He was among a group of Indian Americans who met with George W. Bush in 2001 following the September 11 attacks. During that President's administration, Qazi said:0

There is a very strong feeling in legal circles that some of the legislation that has come out of Washington recently may seriously compromise the rights of some minorities or Americans in the country. The profiling that is being done is a strong problem that needs to be looked at. We obviously need to work with our political leadership and the administration to see how we can best balance the security issues and the rights of citizens. ... .I think there is a strong feeling in the Muslim community that if there is a Muslim individual who might be accused of carrying out any activity, then the whole community is under the focus and the microscope, rather than just that individual.

Following the arrest of Muzzammil Hassan for the murder and beheading of Hassan's estranged spouse, Qazi was quoted as saying "Domestic violence is despicable, and Islam condones it in no way whatever."
