= Safi Qureshey =

Pakistani-American entrepreneur (born 1951)

Safi U. Qureshey
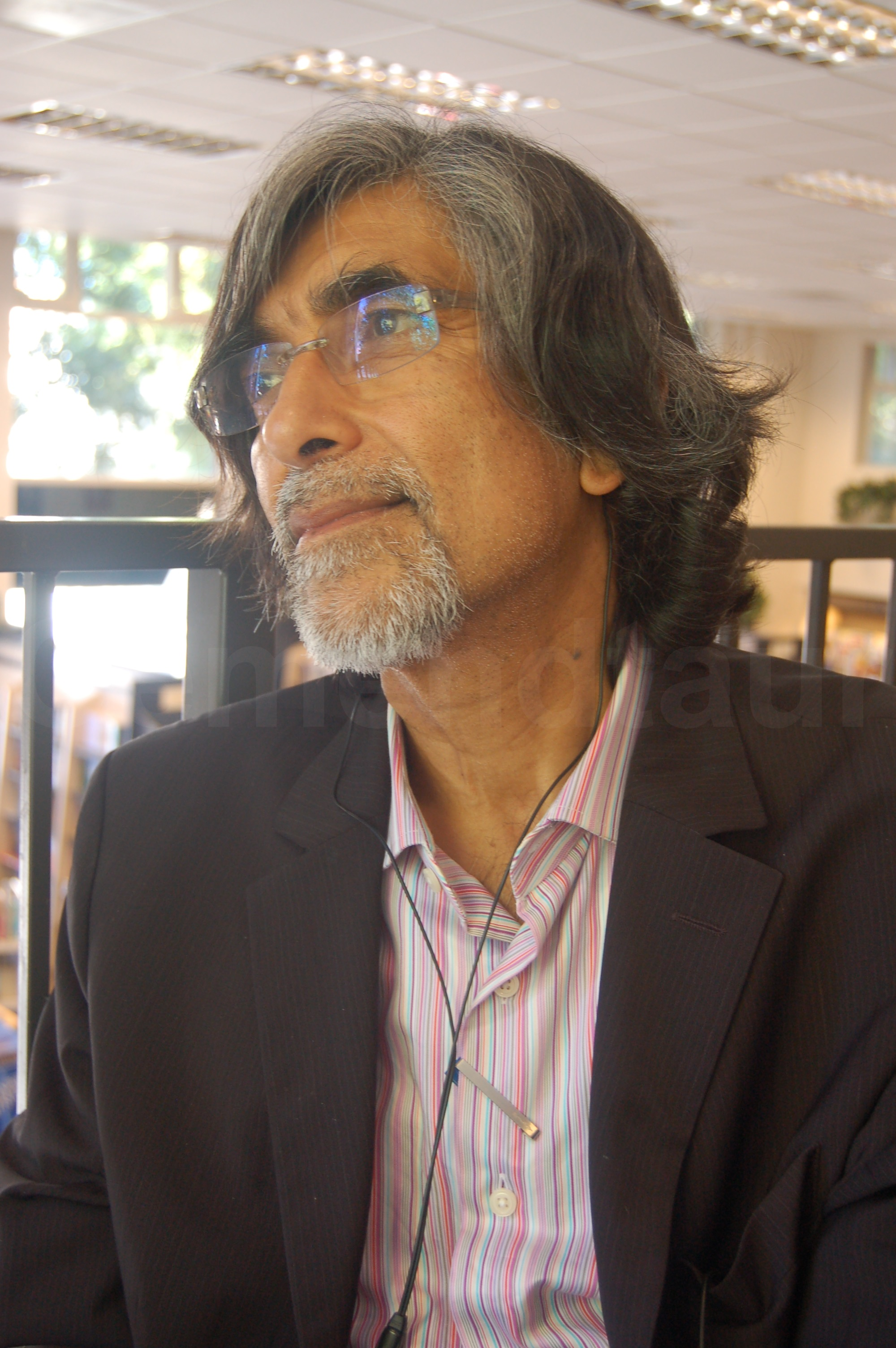
- Born: February 15, 1951; Karachi, Pakistan
- Education: University of Karachi, B.Sc Physics; University of Texas, Arlington, Elec. Eng.
- Occupations: Computer engineer, entrepreneur, philanthropist
- Known for: Co-founder of AST Research, Regents Professor at University of California, Irvine

Safi Urrehman Qureshey is a Pakistani-American entrepreneur. He was the co-founder and CEO of AST Research, Inc., a personal computer manufacturer acquired by Samsung Electronics in 1997. Qureshey is involved with several start-up technology companies as an advisor, board member and seed investor. Qureshey currently serves as regent's professor at the University of California, Irvine's (UCI's) Graduate School of Management, and also actively supports U.C. Irvine's Bonney Center for Neurobiology of Learning and Memory. Qureshey graduated from The University of Texas at Arlington in 1975 as a Computer Science Major. In 2000, he created the eponymous "Safi Qureshey Foundation" to provide "a conduit of support for socially and economically underserved children and adults to build better and more secure futures".

Qureshey was named by California Governor Arnold Schwarzenegger to his transition team, to help him put together his new administration. Qureshey is also a former member of President Clinton's Export Council.

== Early life and education ==
Qureshey was born in Karachi, Pakistan, on February 15, 1951. He attended the University of Karachi and received a Bachelor's of Science in Physics. He later came to the United States and attended the University of Texas, Arlington, where he graduated with a BS in electrical engineering after transferring from the physics department.

== Career ==
=== AST Research ===
In 1980, he and two colleagues, Albert Wong and Tom Yuen formed AST Research, in Irvine, California. Qureshey served as the company's CEO. The name AST came from the first letters of their first names. The company originally provided consulting services, moved to building motherboards for IBM computers and eventually started building their own PCs. They shipped their first computer in 1986, and shipped the first sub-$1,000 computer in 1990. Samsung acquired the company in 1997 and Qureshey stepped down as CEO.

=== Quartics ===
After leaving AST, Qureshey founded Quartics, an Irvine, California–based semiconductor startup developing systems-on-a-chip (SoC) for wireless video transmission. The company's products were chips that allowed PCs to transmit content to televisions, and HD video codecs. Qureshey served as the company's CEO until November 2008.

=== Irvine Ventures ===
In 2000, Qureshey launched the Irvine Ventures incubator with a $50 million investment. The group works with UCI and other local research institutions to launch new companies.

=== Government service ===
In 2003, Qureshey was named by California Governor Arnold Schwarzenegger to his transition team, to help him put together his new administration. Qureshey was also a member of President Clinton's Export Council, where he traveled to emerging countries with successive Secretaries of Commerce to promote international business.

=== Teaching ===
Qureshey is a Regent's Professor with the Paul Merage School of Business at UCI.

=== Patents ===
Qureshey holds a number of patents related to web audio broadcasts and playback onto connected devices.

== Philanthropy ==
In 2004, the LA Times called Qureshey "one of Southern California's leading Muslim philanthropists". He has worked to use new media and television to fight illiteracy. He founded the Active Learning Initiative Facility (ALIF) in Pakistan, which brought Sesame Street characters to that country to facilitate learning. He also provided funding for the Silicon Valley–based Koshish Foundation, a non-profit corporation focusing on education-related projects, to translate over 1,700 math and basic science videos to Urdu for e-learning company Khan Academy.

He founded the Safi Qureshey Foundation, which supports socially and economically underserved children and adults, and he is a trustee with Give2Asia, a group dedicated to developing a social responsibility and philanthropy presence in Asia. The Qureshey Research Laboratory (QRL) at University of California, Irvine UCI, completed in 1997, was named for his daughter after a large donation from Qureshey.

Qureshey also founded and served as the first President of The Indus Entrepreneurs (TiE) Southern California chapter. The group consists of South Asian entrepreneurs and mentors.

== Awards and recognition ==
In 1995, UCI awarded Qureshey its highest honor, the UCI medal, for his contributions to the school.

In 1998, Qureshey received the American Muslim Achievement Award for outstanding contributions to work community and humankind, from the Los Angeles–based Muslim Public Affairs Council.
