= AST Research =

American computer manufacturer (1980–1999)

AST Research, Inc.

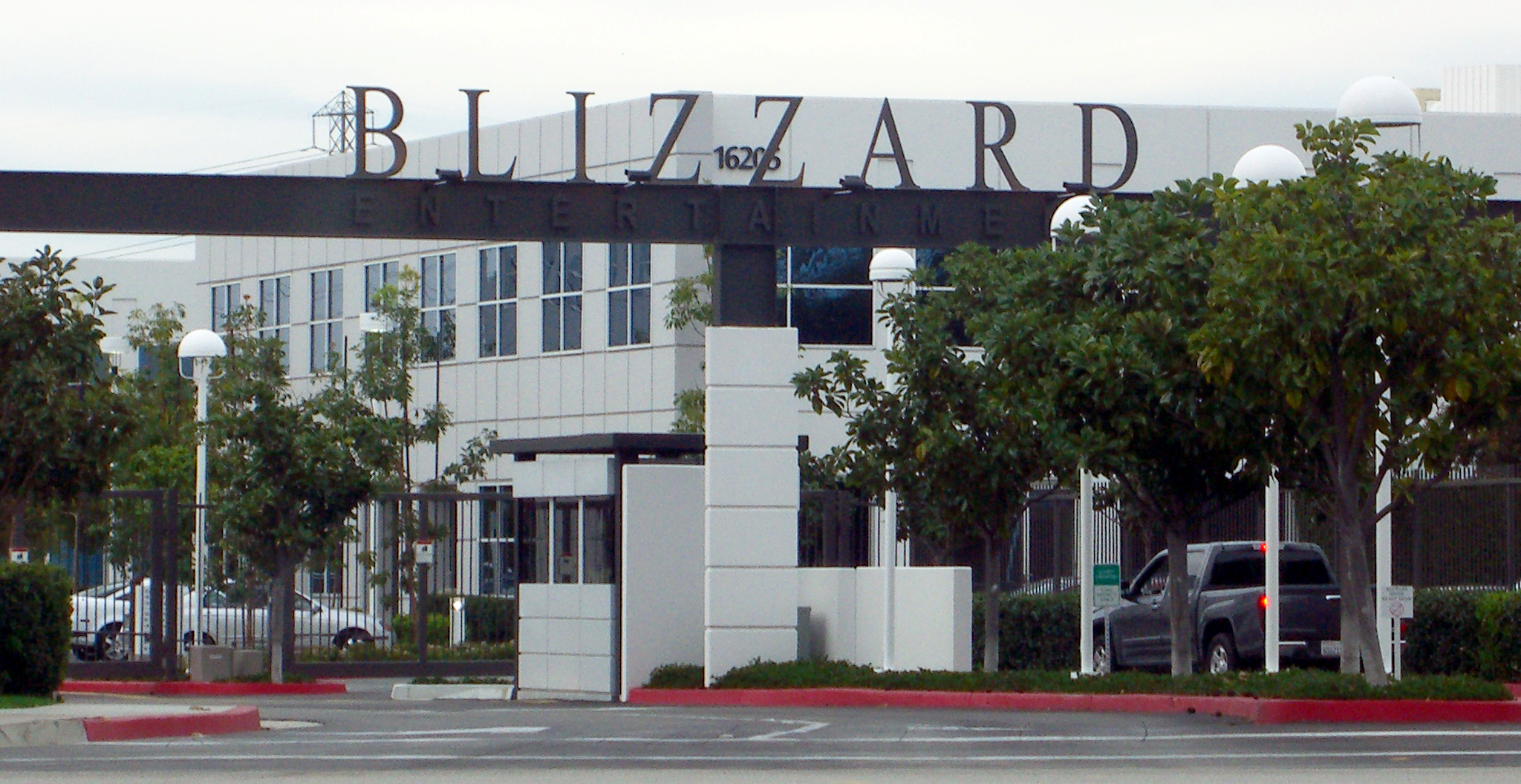
- Former headquarters in Irvine, now occupied by Blizzard Entertainment
- Trade name: AST Computer
- Type: Subsidiary
- Founded: July 25, 1980; 46 years ago, in Irvine, California, United States
- Founder: Albert Wong; Safi Qureshey; Thomas Yuen
- Defunct: February 28, 2001; 25 years ago
- Fate: Dissolved
- Headquarters: Irvine, California, United States
- Number of employees: 6,000 (1995)
- Parent: Samsung Electronics (1997–2001)
- Website: ast.com at the Wayback Machine (archived 1996-10-29)

AST Research, Inc., later doing business as AST Computer, was an American personal computer manufacturer. It was founded in 1980 in Irvine, California, by Albert Wong, Safi Qureshey, and Thomas Yuen, as an initialism of their first names. Wong left the company nine years later, followed by Yuen in 1992, with Qureshey remaining until AST was acquired by Samsung Electronics in 1997.

The company began by making a circuit board for the IBM PC that boosted its memory storage. AST went public in 1984 and would be a manufacturer of boards and add-on expansion cards. By the late 1980s, it had evolved into a major personal computer manufacturer with its line of Intel i386 based PC clones, and it was the first vendor to announce an i486 PC. In 1990, AST released an NEC PC-9801 clone in the Japanese market, becoming the first American PC vendor to market an NEC clone.

AST had established itself as one of the known "alternative" brands of PCs in the United States while globally it had numerous plants and was one of the world's largest makers of personal computers. However, increasing competition and its difficulty to integrate the assets of Tandy Corporation acquired in 1993, led to it making major losses in the following years. Samsung Electronics purchased a stake in AST in 1995 and bought the company outright two years later, leading to co-founder Qureshey stepping down as CEO and chairman. Unable to recover and causing additional losses to Samsung, AST was de facto closed down in 1999 and its brand name and patents sold to a consortium led by Beny Alagem.

== Foundation (1979–1986) ==
AST Research was founded as AST Associates by Thomas C. K. Yuen, Albert C. Wong, and Safi U. Qureshey. All three were immigrants to the United States—Yuen and Wong from Hong Kong and Qureshey from Pakistan. Yuen had met Qureshey while working for Computer Automation Inc. in the 1970s, while Wong was a roommate of Yuen's while they both attended Orange Coast College in Costa Mesa, California. All had come to the United States to study engineering. Yuen was the principal founder of AST, proposing the creation of the company in 1979. Before breaking into the manufacture of hardware, Yuen envisioned the company as a computer consultancy firm for large businesses. The three incorporated AST Research with $2,000 of start-up capital in Irvine, California, in July 1980. The company name is an initialism for the three founders' first names. Selecting their initial job titles by drawing straws, Qureshey was named president, Yuen was named treasurer, and Wong was named secretary.

AST delivered its first products by the end of 1981. By then, the computer consultancy idea had been abandoned, the company was renamed to AST Research, and the trio were deep into researching and developing expansion cards for the original IBM Personal Computer, which had been released in August 1981. The founders deemed the initial models of the IBM PC to have been equipped with an inadequate amount of RAM and communications capability and so devised a range of expansion cards that provided these features. They are listed in the charter issue of PC Magazine as follows: a series of memory expansion cards, ranging from 64 KB to 256 KB of additional RAM (with parity); a modem card with a phone jack and an RS-232 serial port; two asynchronous serial communication cards, one with a single RS-232 port and the other dual ports; and an advanced serial communication card, featuring two independently programmable RS-232 ports that could be programmed to support asynchronous, bisynchronous, SDLC, and HDLC protocols.

Sales of this initial lineup of products doubled every month within the first year of availability. Needing to keep up with the increasing demand from the customer base, the company vied for venture capital but were turned down by multiple banks. Instead, the founders all took out second mortgages on their residences in 1982 and were able to pool an additional $50,000 to invest into the company. Fortunately for the founders, AST's sales reached $13 million in 1983. This sudden increase in sales finally attracted venture capitalists, who invested $2.4 million in the company. In 1984, the company filed its initial public offering, bearing two million shares to the public and making the founders millionaires. Qureshey said in 1983 that AST "will become a $200-million company ... and also manufacture our own computers".

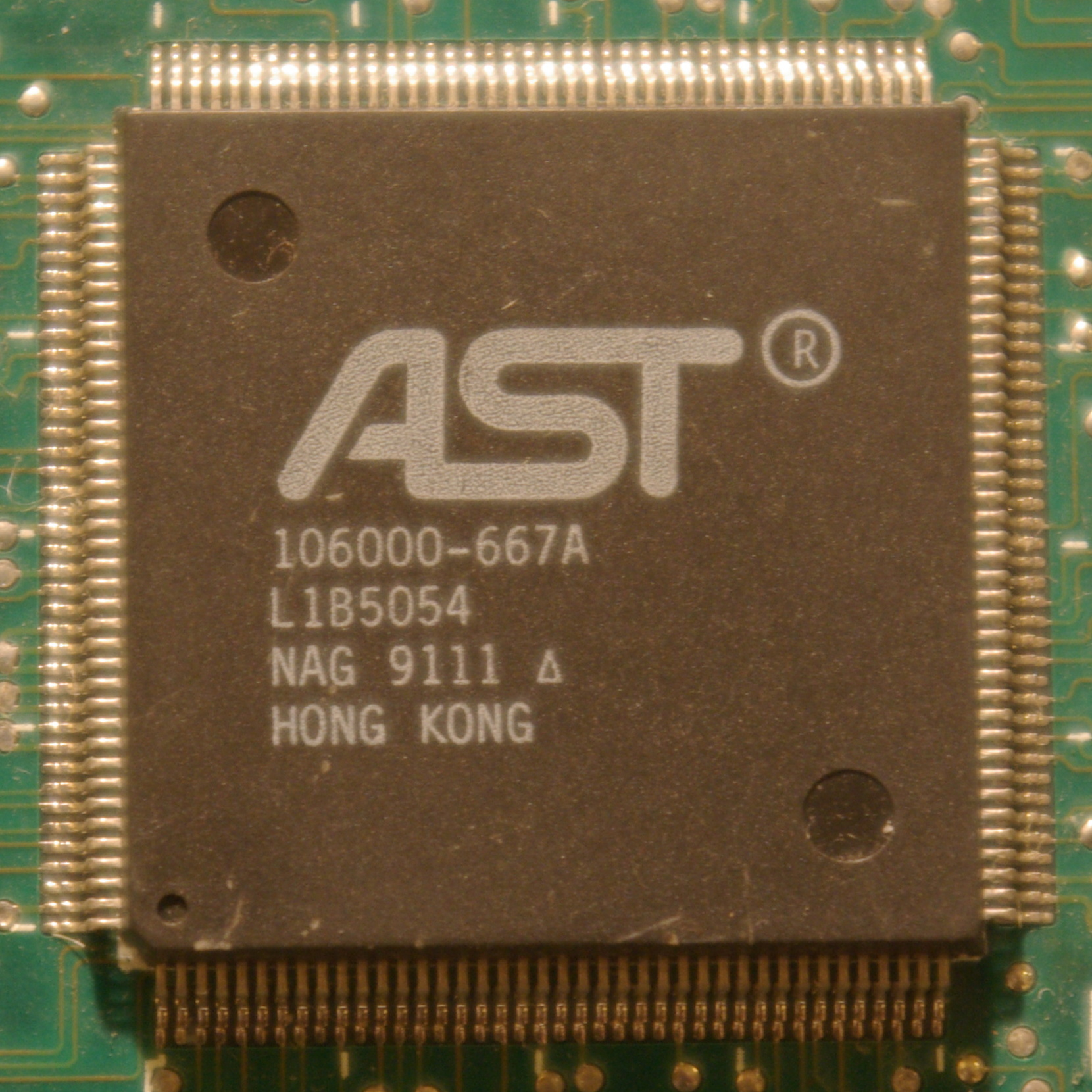
AST-designed ASIC with screen printed logo

In late 1983, the company introduced the SixPakPlus, a popular multifunction expansion card for the IBM PC that led to another sharp increase in sales. In a favorable 1984 review, InfoWorld described it as "perhaps the most popular" such card. By then AST had signed an agreement offered by IBM, allowing the latter company to resell AST's expansion cards at its IBM Product Centers and other reseller channels as "official PC expansion products". In March 1985 AST's executives opened AST Far East, Ltd., in Hong Kong. This was its first international subsidiary, serving as a crucial additional production line for the manufacture of the company's increasingly diverse products. AST's lineup of products by this point counted graphics cards for multiple computing platforms, a hard disk drive unit for the original compact Macintoshes, a multi-function serial/parallel/clock expansion board for the Apple II and a local area network board for the IBM PC.

From 1984 to 1985, AST's income rose from $5.7 million to $19 million, and from 1985 to 1986, AST's revenues doubled, reaching $138.6 million, with SixPakPlus 55% of sales; by March 1986 AST had 40% of the multifunction board market, and corporate buyers saw it as a trustworthy vendor. That month the company purchased the French computer wholesaler National System Company, in order to establish a second international subsidiary, AST France. Shortly after, AST company acquired Camintonn, a computer memory maker. By the end of 1986, AST had established overseas divisions in Australia, Germany, the United Kingdom, and Canada. The combined revenue from international subsidiaries contributed to one quarter of the company's revenue. With this success, AST reincorporated in Delaware to take advantage of its corporate laws.

== PC compatibles and Apple expansion (1986–1989) ==
SixPak was so influential that one in six PCs and clones had one by the end of 1984; by 1986 multifunction cards were often called "SixPak clones". AST's expansion card offerings faced imminent obsolescence by late that year, however, as IBM by this point had offered higher-end upgraded models of the IBM PC, chiefly the PC XT and the PC/AT, that integrated most of the features of AST's PC expansion cards. To keep from posting losses, AST laid off seven percent of the company's 890 employees in July 1986; clandestinely, it also laid plans to introduce a line of PC-compatible computer systems. The AST Premium/286, a clone of the PC/AT featuring an identical Intel 80286 microprocessor, was introduced in October 1986. To make the computer more competitive among a crowded PC compatible market, AST offered the Premium/286 in an optional package that included a discounted laser printer and image scanner, advertised as an inexpensive desktop publishing workstation. AST released an upgraded version of the Premium/286 with the 32-bit Intel 80386 processor—the Premium/386—in October 1987.

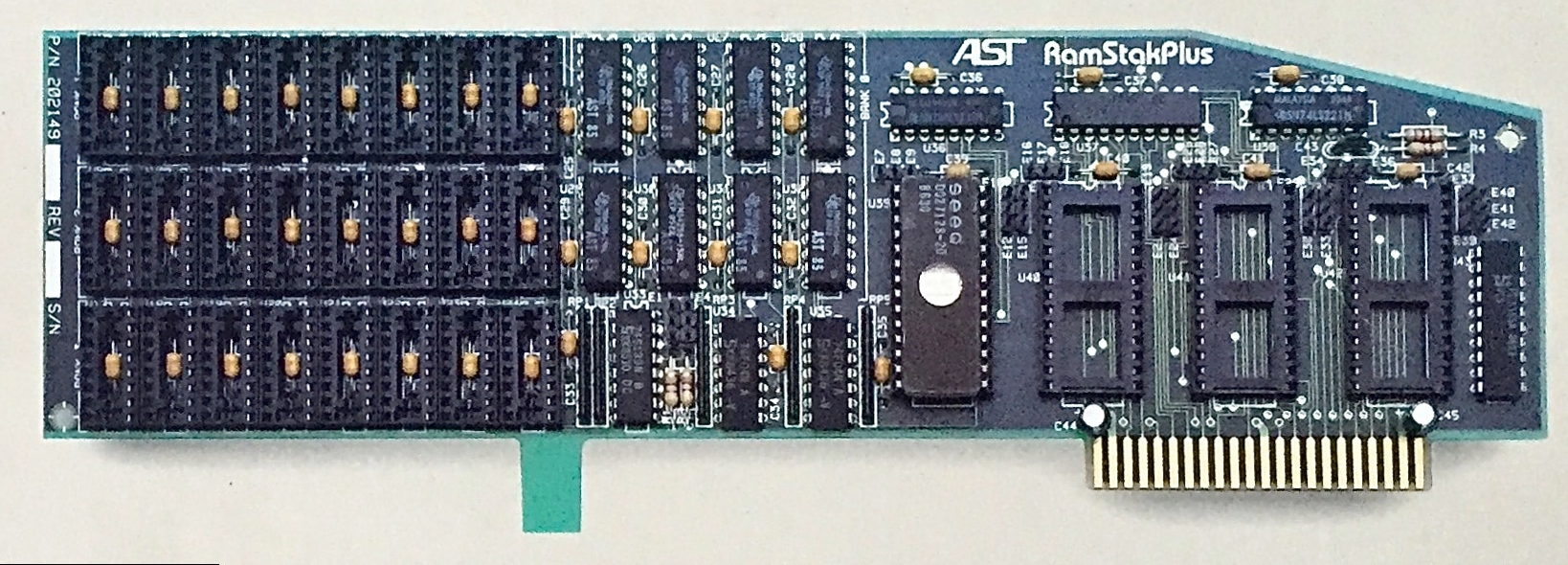
RamStakPlus memory board for the Apple IIGS

AST's products for Apple hardware were profitable enough in the interim. In 1986, AST even expanded its Apple support by introducing peripherals for the then-newly released Apple IIGS, with a pair of expansion cards: the SprintDisk 1 MB RAM Disk card and the AST Vision Plus, a real-time video digitizer card. The Vision Plus was eventually sold to Silicon & Software and licensed to Virtual Realities (and sold through LRO and later Alltech Electronics). In 1987 it went on to produce a memory expansion card for the Apple IIGS: the RamStakPlus, a dual RAM/ROM memory expansion card. AST Research also produced for the Macintosh line the Mac286, a pair of NuBus cards containing an Intel 80286 and RAM, allowing a Macintosh to run MS-DOS side by side with its existing operating system.

By 1987 some AST employees thought that their company could achieve $500 million to $1 billion in annual revenue in the next five years, becoming Orange County, California's leading technology company. The Premium/286 accounted for half of the company's sales by July 1987, but it was only a meager success for AST at first. In 1987, the company reported a net income of $13 million, less than half the profit it had posted the preceding year. AST had several setbacks in 1987, including flat sales of expansion products and delayed shipments of a peripheral for IBM PCs in June 1987 that was a factor in a canceled stock call the following month. That year, IBM sued AST over alleged trademark infringement of IBM's PS/2 product name occurring in one of AST's print advertisements for RAM, which was settled out of court. In 1988, AST's executives began a reorganization effort to preserve the company. The first initiative was the merging of AST's data communications group into its systems products division. With the nascent OS/2 operating system coming to market that year, co-developed by IBM and Microsoft, AST licensed the rights from Microsoft to market its own OEM versions of OS/2 as an option for its Premium line of computers.

In late 1988, AST joined eight other major PC compatible manufacturers to develop the Extended Industry Standard Architecture as a viable competitor to IBM's closely guarded Micro Channel bus architecture. This consortium was known as the Gang of Nine, led by Compaq.

From July to November 1988, AST introduced seven models of premium computers, and in early September 1988, they announced a $2.2 million television advertising campaign, the first commercials of which premiering during the 1988 Summer Olympics that month. The television commercials comprised roughly 20 percent of AST's $12 million advertising budget and were supported by a line of memorabilia, including pins, posters, and video tapes, tying in with the Olympics and offered at computer dealer shows. By the end of 1988, AST's restructuring and advertising efforts were successful, with year-to-year sales increasing 100 percent to $412.7 million. AST was now third place in sales among manufacturers of PC compatibles, behind IBM and Compaq.

In late 1988, Wong was ousted from AST after a heated boardroom debate with Yuen, in which Wong had complained about the company's recent turbulence. In January 1989, the company laid off 120 employees, or six percent of the workforce. In early 1989, AST reported its first quarterly loss, totaling $8.9 million. The technology press speculated that the loss was due to AST ignoring Intel's development of the i486 while the company was busy restructuring and boosting its advertising. When Intel released the i486 to the public in early 1989, AST was one of the few PC compatible manufacturers which did not announce a i486 computer in the pipeline contemporaneously. Slowing sales led to crowded warehouses of AST products, leading to strain for AST in the form of storage costs. To recoup its losses, in April 1989, the company spun off Camintonn, relinquishing control to the division's managers, and in mid-1989, the company sold its Apple-related products to Orange Micro. In 1989, AST was ranked as the ninth largest personal computer manufacturer in the United States with a 2% market share, despite being a relatively late entry in the market. A 1990 American Institute of Certified Public Accountants member survey found that 2% of respondents used AST computers, among the many vendors with single-digit shares of the market after IBM and Compaq.

== Turnaround (1989–1994) ==
In 1989, AST introduced Cupid, the trademark for a method of making computer systems forward-compatible with upgraded microprocessors and memory chips. This works by having the motherboard be a passive backplane, with no processor and memory which are instead located on a Cupid expansion card, to be plugged into the backplane and replaced as upgrades became available. Although the expectation for all AST customers to upgrade their purchases this way was unrealistic, Cupid technology enabled a successful marketing scheme, by eliminating customer hesitation over immediate obsolescence. Such concerns were prevalent due to the rapid increases in computing power in the early 1990s. Using Cupid, AST marketed systems based on the latest and fastest clock-speed revisions of Intel's processors almost immediately—simply by replacing one card in the system—making it possible for AST to price its computers between ten and sixty percent cheaper than competitors.

In April 1990, the company announced the Dual SX/16, a clone of NEC's PC-9801 computer, to be sold exclusively in Japan where the PC-9800 series had flourished. This venture into Japan posed a risk for AST, as the company lacked a large dealer network in the country, but the company's executives, especially Qureshey, were persuaded by the vastness of Japan's business computer market during this time—second only to the United States in size. As it had done in the United States, AST offered the Dual SX/16 with more features and lower prices than domestic competitors. Unlike in the United States, AST developed bespoke brand names for its Japanese computers, in an attempt to fit in the market; the company was also negotiating with Sharp Corporation to market variants of the Dual SX/16 under the Sharp brand. Likewise, AST began marketing computers in former Soviet bloc countries and in India. This push toward foreign markets was another attempt by AST to recover from lost market share in the United States in the early 1990s; by 1995 its share was larger outside the country than in the domestic market.

These developments and more led to a quick financial recovery for AST, and in 1990 the company's stock price had risen roughly 260 percent in concert with its sales and earnings growth. Firmly entrenched as the third-largest PC manufacturer, sales reached nearly $1 billion by the end of 1990. AST was sourced as original equipment manufacturer (OEM) by other computer companies such as Unisys, Tandem Computers, Digital Equipment Corporation, Texas Instruments.

AST were also highly successful in the People's Republic of China where it dominated the PC market in the first half of the 1990s. The company announced its first Chinese factory in 1993.

Success continued in 1991. Industry leader Compaq and several other competitors announced steep price cuts in direct response to AST early in the year. A few months later, when Intel released the low-cost 80486SX desktop processor, AST announced a i486SX-based computer system the next day. That year, AST beat Compaq for a contract to supply over 1,600 laptops to AT&T's sales department. A J. D. Power survey ranked AST third for customer satisfaction behind Dell and Apple, and much better than IBM or Compaq. By early 1991, 65 percent of the computer systems supplied to Fortune 500 companies had AST as OEM. AST engineers Tom Ludwig and Tom Craft had secretly designed the company's first portable computer against their managers' wishes; it provided about 30% of the company's $688.5 million in revenue in fiscal year 1991.

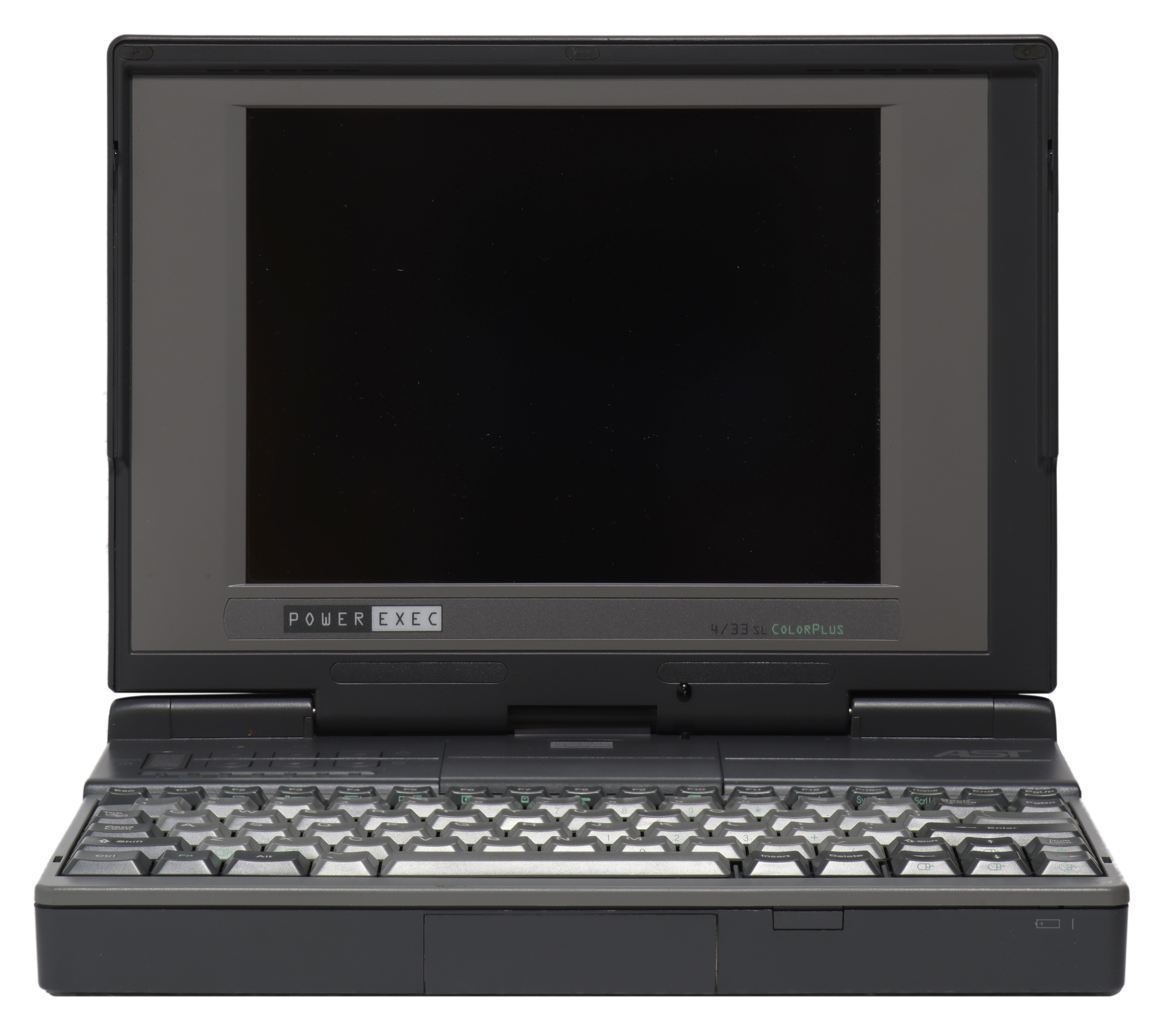
PowerExec 4/33SL ColorPlus, a laptop released by AST in 1993

As with many other computer companies, AST struggled in 1992 due to a fierce price war started by Compaq. Ludwig and Craft left for another company. During plans to restructure AST yet again to minimize operating costs, Yuen left the company early that year, leaving Qureshey as the sole remaining co-founder. Qureshey and his executive board set out to maintain AST's third-place status and keep on top of developments in the computer industry. In November 1992, the company introduced the PowerExec 4/25SL Color Plus, one of the first laptops with the portable-specific 80486SL processor. It was released shortly after Compaq released the LTE Lite 4/25C, which is the first laptop with an i486SL. In 1993, AST announced a joint venture with Grid Systems, a subsidiary of Tandy Corporation, to develop a pen-tablet computer called the PenExec, which has a cordless stylus.

Yuen (but not Wong), Ludwig and Craft, and numerous others who had become top executives at other companies were among 300 AST alumni who attended an Irvine reunion in December 1992. Fiscal 1993 revenue of $1.4 billion was the first billion-dollar year. In mid-1993, AST acquired both Grid Systems and Tandy's computer division for $105 million. The company incurred a loss with this purchase but gained four PC manufacturing plants—one in Scotland, the rest in Texas—and a litany of patents and software copyrights that had been registered to Tandy Corporation. The Scotland plant was later shut down, to afford building another factory in Ireland, and by 1995 only one of the Texas plants remained operational. In January 1994, AST announced its agreement to sell PenRight and FieldNet—pen-based software development tools included in AST's previous acquisition of Grid and Tandy—to the Telxon Corporation. The deal was finalized in April that year. The company reported fiscal 1994 revenue of $2.4 billion and $53.5 million in profit.

== Decline and sale (1994–2001) ==
Later logo of the company, as AST Computer

By the mid-1990s, AST had severe problems in the highly competitive PC market. According to The New York Times, AST's prospect shrunk due to the strategy of offering premium models in an increasingly competitive personal computer market, while Compaq and other top manufacturers slashed prices in direct competition with the cheapest clones. Samsung paid $378 million for 46% of AST in 1995, providing badly needed funding. Sales grew slightly in fiscal year 1995 but the company lost $99.3 million. In August Tandy, which provided 18% of revenue, said that it would sell IBM computers in its Radio Shack stores. By the time former Apple executive Ian Diery replaced Qureshey as CEO in November 1995, AST was no longer the largest computer maker in Orange County; Toshiba Information Systems, which only made portable computers, sold 154,000 more computers in the United States that year. Revenues for 1996 were $2.1 billion, down from 1995 revenues of over $2.3 billion.

In 1997, AST Research was wholly acquired by Samsung. At the time, Samsung owned 46 percent of AST and had offered to buy the remaining common shares. Prior to this move, Samsung had already owned a substantial stake and provided considerable financial support to keep AST going. By December, the number of employees was down to 1,900. In 1999, Samsung was forced to close the California-based computer maker after a string of losses and a mass defection of research talent. Samsung had invested US$1 billion in the company.

The AST trademark was sold to Beny Alagem, co-founder of Packard Bell, on January 10, 1999; Alagem also gained an exclusive license to the company's intellectual property. The deal was estimated at around $200 million in value according to one person familiar with its details. Alagem additionally invested $12.5 million into the formation of AST Computers, a separate, "Internet-driven" joint venture based in Los Angeles, with Alagem holding a 65 percent stake and Samsung holding a 35 percent stake; however, the venture failed to gain traction as the computer market slowed in late 2000, becoming moribund by 2004. Meanwhile, Samsung restructured the original AST as ARI Service to support its existing products until it was dissolved on February 28, 2001.
