= Yasmine Mohammed =

Canadian author

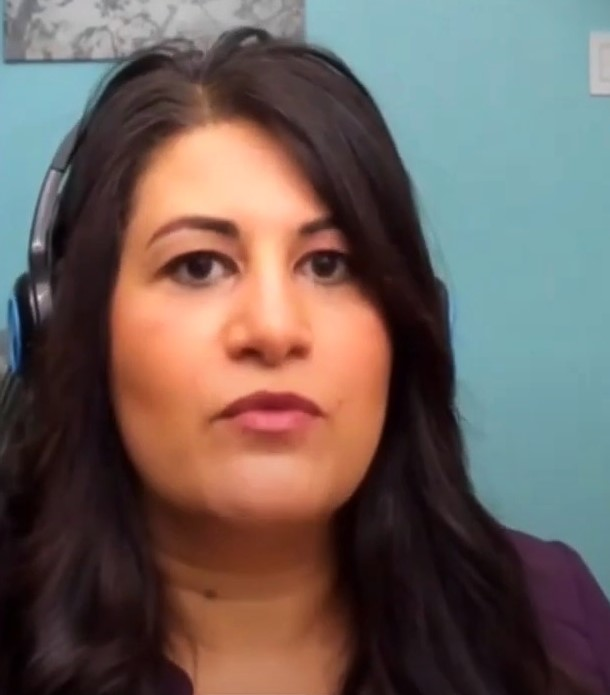
- Mohammed in 2020
- Born: Vancouver, Canada
- Education: University of British Columbia
- Organization: Free Hearts Free Minds
- Known for: Women's rights advocacy, human rights advocacy,
- Notable work: Unveiled: How the West Empowers Radical Muslims
- Children: 2
- Website: yasminemohammed.com

Yasmine Mohammed (Arabic: يَاسَمِين مُحَمَّد, romanized: Yāsamīn Muḥammad) is a Canadian university instructor, human rights activist and author. Mohammed escaped from a forced, abusive marriage to Al-Qaeda operative Essam Marzouk and became an advocate for freethinkers from Muslim communities through her non-profit organization Free Hearts Free Minds. She is a member of the Center for Inquiry Speaker's Bureau and is the co-founder and co-director of the CLARITy Coalition.

Yasmine is the author of Unveiled: How the West Empowers Radical Muslims. Through her nonprofit organization Free Hearts Free Minds, she supports closeted ex-Muslims from Muslim-majority countries and across the globe. She also coordinates an online campaign called No Hijab Day on February 1st to raise awareness against normalizing hijab on World Hijab Day, using the hashtags #FreeFromHijab and #NoHijabDay.

Mohammed has been interviewed by Sam Harris and was mentioned by Real Time with Bill Maher twice.

== Family and early life ==
Yasmine's mother is Egyptian, the niece of former President Mohammed Naguib, and her father was Palestinian, born in Gaza. She was born in Vancouver, British Columbia.

According to Mohammed's autobiography, her family lived a secular life until her father left when she was two, leaving her mother with three young children. Yasmine's mother sought community and support from a local mosque, where she met a man who said he would support her. He was already married, with three of his own children, and Yasmine's mother became his second concurrent wife. Yasmine was six at the time, and states that her mother's situation improved, because her new husband was not abusive towards her. However, Yasmine states in an interview with Sam Harris that her step-father was physically abusive towards her and her siblings. She stated that her mother became what could be described as a "born-again" Muslim, which changed Mohammed's life. She was no longer permitted to go outside to play with her friends and she had to pray five times per day. She was forced to wear a hijab and was beaten for failing to memorize the Quran. She started attending an Islamic school that was established in the mosque. When she was 13, she told a trusted teacher about the abuse she was experiencing and showed him her bruises. The police were called and the case went to court, but Mohammed states that the judge ruled that because her family was Arab, they had the right to discipline her in that manner. She states that it made her feel that she didn't matter as much as other children due to this negligence from the Canadian authorities.

Yasmine has often described the way she was raised as "evil". She started wearing the niqāb at the age of 19, after being introduced to her future husband.

=== Forced marriage to an Al-Qaeda operative ===
When Yasmine was 19, she was forced to marry Al-Qaeda operative Essam Marzouk and had a daughter with him. She later escaped the marriage to protect her daughter from the threat of female genital mutilation. She changed their names and moved to a different city, as she was worried that her daughter would be kidnapped and raised a Muslim. Even though her husband was in prison, she remained frightened because he was a member of Al-Qaeda. Following her escape, she secured student loans and attended the University of British Columbia, where she took a history of religion class and started to examine Islam more critically for the first time.

== Activism ==
No Hijab Day...a day to support brave women...who want to be free from the hijab.
Women who want to decide for themselves what to wear or what not to wear on their heads.
Women who fight against either misogynist governments that will imprison them for removing
their hijab or against abusive families and communities that will ostracize, abuse and even kill them.

— Mohammed, Yasmine.
"Support Muslim women in fight against hijab".
Toronto Sun - 1 February 2019

Yasmine decided to start speaking out after she watched Ben Affleck and Sam Harris debate Islam on Real Time with Bill Maher. She has criticized both Islam and the political left, which she accuses of inadvertently enabling radical Islam through their work to fight Islamophobia. Mohammed is a vocal opponent of the burqa and hijab, as well as attempts to promote their use, viewing the hijab as "a tool of oppression, a garment that perpetuates rape culture". To protest against World Hijab Day, Yasmine started No Hijab Day on Feb 1st as a direct response to World Hijab Day on Feb 1 and promoted the hashtag #FreeFromHijab to raise awareness.

Yasmine also raised money to accommodate Rahaf Mohammed, an asylum seeker who fled to Canada from Saudi Arabia to escape her abusive family. According to Erich J. Prince, Mohammed has become a frequent commentator on Islam's relationship with the West, particularly in Canada.

Yasmine was a witness at the Standing Committee on Canadian Heritage on November 8, 2017 regarding the inclusion of the word Islamaphobia in Motion 103. She indicated that the motion's aim is "...to quell bigotry against human beings," but she argued that the term “Islamophobia” does not protect Muslims but protects the ideology of Islam. Mohammed was one of several witnesses that cautioned committee members to not be in a rush to legislate because of an "increasing public climate of hate and fear." Mohammed and other witnesses recommended that existing laws need to be enforced and strengthened to curb hatred and discrimination for all Canadians and not just one group of Canadians.

In 2017, Yasmine contributed an essay called Unholy Alliance: Why do left-wing Americans support right-wing Muslims? to SEDAA: Our Voices, a platform that features writers of Muslim Heritage, where she writes about her story and issues facing ex-Muslims.

Among her goals are to counter extremist Islamism and antisemitism. She refutes accusations against Israel of 'apartheid' and 'genocide', saying "No matter how many times you repeat a lie, it will never be true." Yasmine consistently speaks up in support of women rights under Sharia Law and in Islamic countries. ‘When I see how many women are suffering, as I suffered, it reminds me how important it is to speak openly about my ordeal.

=== No Hijab Day ===
Yasmine started the campaign No Hijab Day through the hashtag #FreeFromHijab on February 1, a hashtag campaign to raise awareness about the girls and women who want to take off their hijabs but cannot or who have already taken it off and are facing the consequences thereof.

=== Free Hearts Free Minds ===
Yasmine founded a non-profit organization called Free Hearts Free Minds that helps ex-Muslims living in Muslim-majority countries with state-sanctioned death penalties for leaving Islam. The organization provides psychological counselling for people leaving Islam, especially focusing on providing services to women from Saudi Arabia and LGBT individuals from the Muslim world.

== Publication ==
Mohammed wrote a memoir titled Unveiled: How Western Liberals Empower Radical Islam, which was self-published on 25 September 2019. She received two years of rejection letters before being convinced by Sam Harris to self-publish. The memoir outlines her upbringing in a fundamentalist, Islamic household in Canada, her step-father beating the bottoms of her feet for not reciting her prayers correctly, being married against her will to an Al-Qaeda operative, her escape and subsequent activism.

In an interview with Seth Andrews, host of The Thinking Atheist podcast, Andrews questioned her choice of title. Because not all western liberals empower radical Islam, he thought the title could have been Unveiled: How Many Western Liberals Empower Radical Islam. Mohammed responded that a more accurate title for the book could have been How Some Western Liberals Unintentionally Empower Radical Islam but this would not have captured sufficient attention. Yasmine subsequently changed the name of her book to Unveiled: How the West Empowers Radical Muslims for the Updated and Revised Edition.

== Controversies and criticisms ==
Islamophobia allegations

Yasmine Mohammed has been accused of advancing Islamophobic views, which allegedly involve prejudice and discrimination against Islam and Muslims. Reports and academic studies claim to have connected her to a broader "Islamophobia industry," a well-resourced network that promotes "anti-Muslim ideologies" and contributes to "systemic discrimination against Muslims". This industry comprises various entities, including media organizations, think tanks, and influential individuals who propagate "anti-Muslim rhetoric".

Such research alleges Mohammed has involvement in this network. For instance, reports such as Fear, Inc.: The Roots of the Islamophobia Network in America and The Islamophobia Industry illustrate how individuals and groups, including some activists and commentators, contribute to the dissemination of Islamophobic ideas. Mohammed's public statements and actions align with the objectives of this industry, which seeks to portray Muslims as threats and perpetuate discriminatory attitudes and policies. An academic research project conducted by Wilfrid Laurier University, called The Canadian Islamophobia Industry: Mapping Islamophobia's Ecosystem in the Great White North, further detail how her activities contribute to these broader Islamophobic agendas.

The report also highlights the following:

"Mohammed is in favour of screening future immigrants to Canada with a Canadian values test. She has argued that Canada is bringing in people that don't share our values. "We didn't vet them before they came here, so we didn't understand that they have completely different values than we do. It's kind of ridiculous for us to expect that once they come and join our country, that their values are going to change; they won't change."

== Personal life ==
Mohammed has two daughters, one from her first marriage and one from her second. She severed ties with her mother after her mother threatened to kill her because she wouldn't wear hijab anymore and because she had become a non-believer.

== Bibliography ==
- Mohammed, Yasmine (2019). Unveiled: How the West Empowers Radical Muslims. Canada: Free Hearts Free Minds. ISBN 9781999240530. OCLC 1114336781.

== See also ==
- 2017–2019 Iranian protests against compulsory hijab
- Ayaan Hirsi Ali
- Masih Alinejad
- Rita Panahi
- Ex-Muslims
- International Women's Day
- List of former Muslims
- Motion 103
- My Stealthy Freedom
- Criticism of World Hijab Day
