= Muzzammil Hassan =

American murderer and businessman

- Born: May 26, 1964 (age 62); Pakistan
- Other name: Mo Steve Hassan
- Education: University of Rochester
- Occupations: Former banker, CEO of Bridges TV
- Spouse: Aasiya Zubair (deceased)
- Children: Four
- Status: Incarcerated in Clinton Correctional Facility
- Criminal charge: Second-degree murder
- Penalty: 25 years to life

Muzzammil Syed Hassan (born May 26, 1964), also known as Mo Steve Hassan, is a Pakistani-American, and former CEO of Bridges TV. Bridges TV was the first American Muslim television network broadcast in English. He resigned from the position in February 2009.

On February 7, 2011, Hassan was found guilty of second degree murder for beheading his wife of eight years, Aasiya Zubair.

== Professional life ==
Muzzammil Hassan came to the United States from Pakistan at age 17, eventually graduating magna cum laude with an MBA from the William E. Simon Graduate School of Business Administration at the University of Rochester in 1996. He went on to become a successful banker in Buffalo, New York.

In 2004, his wife Aasiya prompted him to develop "an American Muslim media where her kids could grow up feeling really strong about their identity as an American Muslim." Hassan expressed belief that some moderate Muslims could not identify with the extreme stereotypes often depicted in Hollywood productions and said that such Muslims "think they are not accurately portrayed" and that "Bridges TV gives American Muslims a voice and will depict them in everyday, real life situations." "Every day on television we are barraged by stories of a 'Muslim extremist, militant, terrorist, or insurgent,'" Hassan said in the 2004 release. "But the stories that are missing are the countless stories of Muslim tolerance, progress, diversity, service and excellence that Bridges TV hopes to tell." The Hassans received an award for this effort from the Council on American-Islamic Relations in 2007.

== Murder, arrest, and trial ==
In February 2009, Hassan was arrested and charged with beheading his estranged wife Aasiya Zubair. According to Orchard Park police, Hassan came to the police station at 6:20 pm on February 12, 2009, the day of the killing, and reported his wife dead. Her body was found at the TV station. Police had previously visited the Hassans' home in response to domestic incidents. They were most recently called to the residence February 6, 2009, the day Hassan was served with divorce papers and an order of protection, where it is reported he was banging on doors and even broke a window. Hassan said in an interview after his arrest that he "felt an incredible amount of relief" after he killed his wife. "I felt like I had escaped from an Al Qaeda terrorist camp and the safest place was the Orchard Park Police Station. I felt safe and secure with them." Hassan's sister-in-law, Asma, the victim's sister in South Africa, said that Aasiya was abused, and feared for her life.

The divorce petition cited "violence and inhuman treatment" as the reason. Police reports indicated that Zubair stated her husband's abusive and controlling behavior had begun at least six years earlier. Muzzammil Hassan was arraigned before Village Justice Deborah Chimes and sent to the Erie County Holding Center. Sources claimed to be close to the case said hunting knives were used to commit the crime.

Prosecutor Colleen Curtin Gable said Hassan, who is stocky and over 6 feet tall, bought two hunting knives less than an hour before the attack, then parked his SUV out of view at the station, and hid in wait inside the station to await his wife. When Hassan's wife walked through the door, he stabbed her more than 40 times in the face, back, chest, and decapitated her, some of which was caught on surveillance video. Their 4- and 6-year-old children, plus a teenage son from one of his two previous marriages, were left buckled into car seats outside in a van during the murder.

Hassan, who dismissed four defense attorneys and acted as his own lawyer during the trial, used his two-hour closing remarks telling the jury how he was a slave to his wife's rages. However, Hassan never produced any witnesses or evidence to substantiate his abuse claims, while prosecutors cited numerous police reports filed by his wife and her medical records which testified to her being the battered spouse.

The New York state jury convicted Muzzammil "Mo" Hassan of second-degree murder after an hour of deliberation. Erie County District Attorney Frank Sedita said the sentence was the maximum amount that could be imposed under state law, and that Hassan will not be "eligible to talk to the parole board" for 25 years. "The chances of him getting out before his sentence is completed is not going to happen." A protection order on behalf of Hassan's two children was also issued by Erie County Judge Thomas Franczyk.

== Reaction to arrest ==
Shortly after the arrest, Bridges TV posted the following notice on their website:

Bridges TV is deeply shocked and saddened by the murder of Aasiya [Zubair] Hassan and subsequent arrest of Muzzammil Hassan. Our deepest condolences and prayers go out to the families of the victim. We request that their right to privacy be respected.

At the Muslim Community Center in Amherst, New York, more than 200 gathered for early morning prayers and a funeral service for Ms. Hassan, who had been active at the center's mosque. "She was more of a practicing Muslim" than her husband, said attendee Hassan Shibly to the New York Times, who worked for the television station with the Hassans prior to enrolling in law school. "She really believed in the cause, wanting to present her faith in an accurate light and now people are blaming her very faith for her death."

The victim's sister, 42-year-old Asma Firfirey of the vicinity of Cape Town, South Africa, said she and her husband Amier talked to Aasiya Hassan the day of the murder. According to Asma Firfirey, she heard her sister tell Muzzammil Hassan to "calm down" and that they "could talk the following day about the divorce". According to Asma and her husband, they described hearing what sounded like her sister struggling to breathe before the telephone connection ended. Asma Firfirey has said that Hassan, whom she calls "the fat man with the evil eyes," will be more dangerous when he is released on bail.

Khalid Qazi, president of the Muslim Public Affairs Council of Western New York and a friend of the couple, said that Hassan "was worried about the station's future" and added "Domestic violence is despicable, and Islam condones it in no way whatever." Afshan Qureshi, a local Muslim leader and the president of an advocacy group in Rochester, New York for domestic violence victims, lamented that the community had been too quick to overlook Muzzammil Hassan's faults: "We punished the victims. People said the first marriage failed because the girl was American, the second marriage failed because the girl wasn't patient enough and then, look, the third wife is happy. Everything is OK. The community is an accomplice in the story of Muzzammil Hassan."

Conversely, Marcia Pappas, New York State president of the National Organization for Women opined "This was apparently a terroristic version of honor killing, a murder rooted in cultural notions about women's subordination to men." Pappas' superior, Kim Gandy, president of the National Organization of Women, stated:

Although the crime was quickly decried by Muslim groups, many talk shows and blogs used the horror of Muzzammil's act to indict an entire community -- in a way that they would never have accused the entire Christian religion because a Methodist man murdered his estranged wife in a horrible way. Three weeks ago, a Chinese graduate student at Virginia Tech cut off a female friend's head with a knife. Not a single news outlet referred to his religion.

On March 5, 2010, Hassan's attorneys announced that Hassan "isn't even a practicing Muslim and that public speculation has been unfair."

According to a former employee, in the past few years Bridges TV transformed itself into more of a cross-cultural network seeking to bridge the gap between all cultures. Most of their employees were not Muslim, the former employee said, and Muzzammil Hassan himself was not devout, neither praying nor fasting. Out of deference to his Jewish friends, Hassan expressed aversion to producing shows about Palestine. Nancy Sanders, the television station's news director for over two years, said "I just do not feel it was an honor killing. I think it was domestic abuse that got out of control."

The Council on American-Islamic Relations and the Islamic Society of North America responded with an "Open Letter to Muslim Leaders", expressing shock and sadness at the murder, condemning domestic violence, and calling on imams and Muslim leaders to "provide support and help to protect the victims of domestic violence" and "to never second-guess a woman who comes to us indicating that she feels her life to be in danger".

== Previous marriages and children ==
Prior to his marriage to Aasiya Zubair, Hassan was married twice before: first, to a Caucasian American woman, Janice, with whom he had two children, Michael and Sonia; second, for 13 months to a Pakistani-American Muslim woman, Sadia. According to Sadia's cousin, Zerqa Abid, both of his earlier wives filed for divorce on the same grounds of severe domestic violence and abuses.

In addition to the two children from his first marriage (ages 34–35 and 35–36), he has two children (a girl age 21–22 and a boy age 23–24) from his third marriage (to Aasiya).

== Trial ==
The prosecution accused Hassan of stabbing his wife 40 times and beheading her because she filed for divorce six days before. Hassan's lawyer, Jeremy Schwartz, claims Hassan was beaten by his wife and feared for his life. Hassan initially pleaded not guilty to the charge of second-degree murder. The trial began on Tuesday, January 18, 2011. On Monday, January 24, Hassan gained permission from Judge Thomas Franczyk to represent himself after repeatedly trying to dismiss his own defense attorney, Jeremy Schwartz. Hassan did admit, however, that he had beaten his wife repeatedly between December 2007 and March 2008.

On January 24, Hassan asked for the case to be dismissed, citing lack of evidence by the prosecution. This request was denied. On the same day, text messages between Hassan and his wife from the date of the murder were released as evidence. In an unusual turn, Hassan asked to represent himself. After first denying him, Erie County Court Judge Thomas Franczyk eventually granted his request. He testified on the 27th and 28 January, with his former defense attorney Jeremy Schwartz acting as his legal adviser.

Hassan is currently incarcerated in Clinton Correctional Facility. His parole hearing date is set for October 2033.
