= Mac286 =

The Mac286 was an Intel 80286-based MS-DOS coprocessor expansion card for one of Apple Computer's first expandable Macintosh computers, the 1987 Macintosh II. It was developed by Phoenix Technologies under contract to Apple Computer and sold by AST Research in an effort to close the gap between the Macintosh and IBM PC computing worlds. AST also introduced the related Mac86 card for the Macintosh SE.

By 1989, AST had left the Apple market and sold the rights and technologies for the Mac286 and Mac86 cards to Orange Micro. Orange Micro would later make a successful line of coprocessor cards based on the 80x86 processor family, before leaving the coprocessor market to concentrate on USB and FireWire products.

In 1992, Orange Micro discontinued the Mac286 board. Support for the card was discontinued sometime later.

== Mac86 ==
The Mac86 was designed for the Macintosh SE PDS slot, and integrated a 10 MHz Intel 8086 CPU. The Mac86 did not include its own RAM, instead sharing up to 640 KB of the host Macintosh's RAM. A floppy drive controller was integrated, including an external bracket to connect an Apple PC 5.25 Drive.

Mac86 box front

Mac86 box back

== The Mac286 hardware ==
There are three distinct versions of the Mac286 hardware:

- The original AST version consists of a pair of full-length NuBus cards, joined by two ribbon cables. The first board consists of a CPU card while the second board acts as a disk controller and memory card.
- The early Orange Micro version is similar to the AST version. It was reworked in some areas and contains additional circuitry, permitting memory upgrades.
- The later Orange Micro version consists of a single board with a greater degree of VLSI chips.

Of the three versions, the AST appears to be the most common.

=== Details ===
- Intel 80286 processor, operating at 8 MHz, 12MHz or 16 MHz, depending on version. (A 10 MHz version may also exist.)
- Socket for an optional Intel 80287 math coprocessor
- Phoenix Technologies 286 BIOS v3.00 (This is an AT BIOS.)
- 1 MB Non-parity RAM, organized as 4 256K SIMMs (640K visible to MS-DOS)
- NEC 765-based floppy controller (NOTE: Unlike most PC floppy controller boards, the circuit in the Mac286 allows for Single Density operation. This is primarily of interest to those wishing to read older CP/M diskettes with the appropriate software.)
- 37-pin port for optional external floppy (Apple PC 5.25 Drive or equivalent)

The Mac286 software provides emulation of the following additional hardware:

- CGA or Hercules Graphics Card (switchable)
- 1.44 MB Floppy drive as drive A: (if a SuperDrive is installed in the Macintosh)
- 20 MB Hard disk, stored as a file on the host Mac.
- Access to the file system of the Mac via an emulated drive D:
- 0, 1, or 2 COM ports (These are mapped to the Mac's Modem and Printer ports.)
- Printer port, emulating either an Epson MX-80 or an Apple LaserWriter. (The latter is only available if a real LaserWriter is connected to the system.)

=== Reception ===
Reviews of the expansion noted the lack of responsiveness, particularly in CGA mode, despite the generally higher performance of a hardware solution when compared to software emulators, leading to suggestions that the complexity of display emulation might be at fault. With the product's usability impaired by "the extreme slowness of the display system", it was noted that a leaflet accompanying the product documentation promised improved screen handling as a key improvement in a planned version 1.1 of the product.
