= Tangerine (color) =

Orange color hue

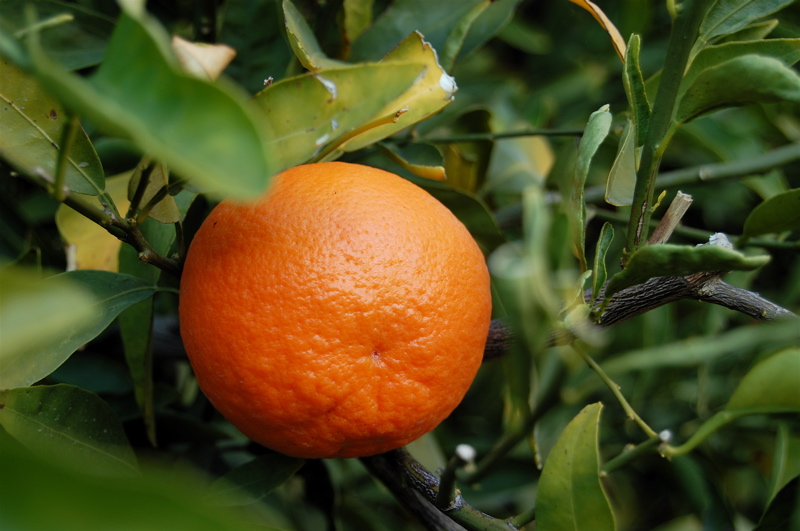

Color coordinates
- Hex triplet: #F28500
- sRGB^{B} (r, g, b): (242, 133, 0)
- HSV (h, s, v): (33°, 100%, 95%)
- CIELCh_{uv} (L, C, h): (66, 110, 34°)
- Source: ColorHexa
- ISCC–NBS descriptor: Vivid orange
- B: Normalized to [0–255] (byte)

The color tangerine is a tone of orange named after the fruit of the same name.

== Use in graphic design ==
Hues of tangerine are used by graphic designers when constructing identities, brand recognition, and stand-out ads for clients. As a result of the brightness of the color variants, they are employed to make a small but centrally important object stand out, especially when surrounded by the flat colors of earth tones. Tangerine hues may also be selected as complements to other bright hues, and because of their relative rarity of use.

One of the original "fruit-flavored" iMacs released in 1999 was the Tangerine iMac (Apple could not call it "Orange" due to the existence of the rival firm Orange Micro).

In sports, the English association football club Blackpool play in and are strongly identified with the color of tangerine since 1923.

== Variations of tangerine ==
=== Vivid tangerine ===
Vivid tangerine

Color coordinates
- Hex triplet: #FF9980
- sRGB^{B} (r, g, b): (255, 153, 128)
- HSV (h, s, v): (12°, 50%, 100%)
- CIELCh_{uv} (L, C, h): (73, 81, 23°)
- Source: Crayola
- B: Normalized to [0–255] (byte)

Displayed at right is the color vivid tangerine. It is considered a vivid shade of tangerine.

It was made into a Crayola crayon color in 1990.

=== Atomic tangerine ===
Atomic tangerine

Color coordinates
- Hex triplet: #FF9966
- sRGB^{B} (r, g, b): (255, 153, 102)
- HSV (h, s, v): (20°, 60%, 100%)
- CIELCh_{uv} (L, C, h): (73, 90, 30°)
- Source: Crayola
- ISCC–NBS descriptor: Strong yellowish pink
- B: Normalized to [0–255] (byte)

Atomic tangerine was formulated by Crayola in 1990. It is considered a fluorescent shade of tangerine.

(Atomic tangerine is supposed to be a fluorescent color, but there is no mechanism for showing fluorescence on a flat computer screen.)

== See also ==
- List of colors
