= Global Pink Hijab Day =

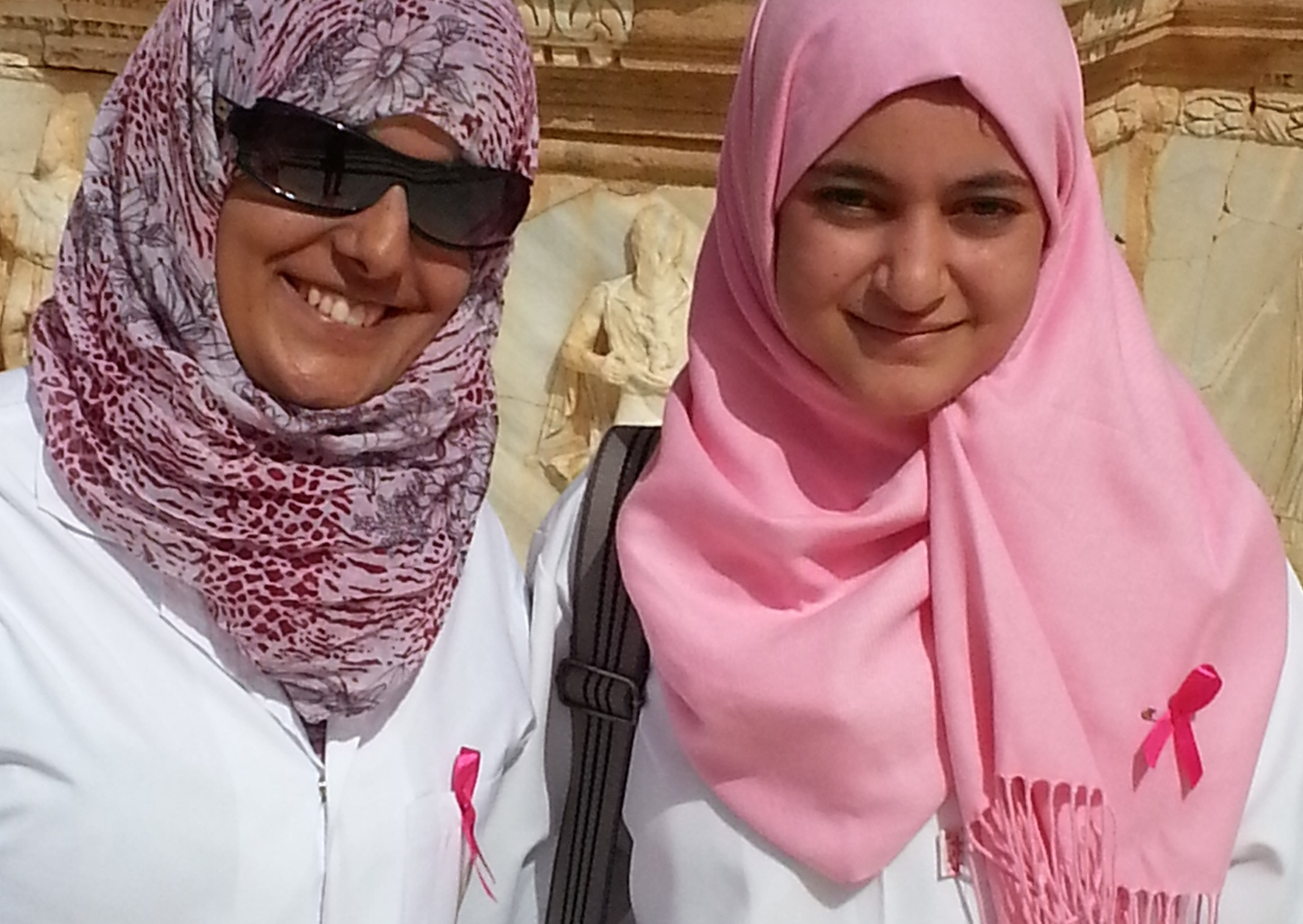
Medical students in Sabratha, Libya, campaigning for breast cancer awareness, 2012

Global Pink Hijab Day was an initiative that began as an experiment by founder, Hend El-Buri and a group of high school students in Columbia, Missouri. It was intended to remove stereotypes of Muslim women by having Muslims engage in dialogue about breast cancer awareness, joining walks in groups while wearing pink headscarves, and holding other events promoting awareness and support for the cause. Global Pink Hijab Day was last celebrated in 2011.

Global Pink Hijab Day was a global movement, with many participants including men who wear pink kufis (or skull caps) to celebrate breast cancer awareness. It took place at many Islamic schools and student organizations throughout the United States.

== History ==
Pink Hijab Day was founded in 2004 by Hend El Buri, a high school student at the time. It began small, in a high school in Columbia, MO. A group of girls decided to wear pink hijabs one day to encourage others to ask questions about their hijabs and about Islam. After more and more people began participating, the Susan G. Komen Foundation was contacted and Pink Hijab Day was held. The girls believed wearing pink might lessen the tension of how people view Muslim girls wearing hijabs, hoping it would encourage people who are curious about Muslim women and hijabs to ask questions to dispel misconceptions.

=== Previous Dates ===
- Wednesday, October 29, 2008
- Wednesday, October 28, 2009
- Wednesday, October 27, 2010
- Wednesday, October 26, 2011

== Purpose ==
According to their official website, Global Pink Hijab Day had three purposes:

- To encourage others to be more open to asking and learning about Muslim women’s hijabs.
- To encourage Muslim women to be involved with local community projects.
- To raise money for cancer treatments and awareness of preventive care.

== Observance ==
Although it started in small college town Columbia, Missouri, Pink Hijab Day grew to be a worldwide day supporting and raising funds and awareness for breast cancer. Pink Hijab Day events are held in countries like Australia, Bulgaria, Canada, and South Africa, as well as States across America.

Inspired by the Pink Hijab Day movement the Muslim Southern Belle Charities Incorporated began participating in 2007. Muslim Southern Belle Charities relocated from Lexington, KY to Houston, TX in 2015 and held their first Pink Hijab Day event at Al-Ansaar Masjid in the Woodlands, TX in 2016. The event encouraged to wear a pink hijab and encouraged those in attendance to make a donation to Assalam Clinic at the Al-Salaam mosque to help pay for female medical screenings. Entertainment consisted of the Muslim Southern Belle version of the Hijabi Monologues to instill women empowerment through storytelling. The Monologues "allowed for many to start a dialogue when they had felt in the past their voices would not be heard". A hijab swap to benefit the Muslim Southern Belle Charities Incorporated Revert Closet; a project to benefit new Muslim reverts find the items they need to pray, visit the masjid and have a more modest wardrobe.

In 2017, The Muslim Southern Belle Charities Incorporated once again raised funds for the Assalam Clinic towards their Well Women's Clinic at a local coffee shop. It was an exciting night with speakers, henna, face painting, and a huge silent auction. Speakers included Chrystal Said, the founder and president of Muslim Southern Belle Charities incorporated, a breast cancer survivor and a local OB/GYN. After the speakers guests were entertained with a henna artist, face painting, and a huge silent auction. The auction included art, gift certificates, scarves, baby attire, hair straighteners from Farouk Systems, spa day, luxury nail basket, Pampered Chef gift box, babysitting, sunglasses and jewelry.

Muslim Southern Belle Charities Incorporated plans to continued to participate in Pink Hijab Day and bring greater awareness to the Muslim Community about breast cancer and ways to help.

== See also ==
- World Hijab Day
