= Alaa Murabit =

Canadian physician and activist

Alaa Murabit MSC
- آلاء المرابط
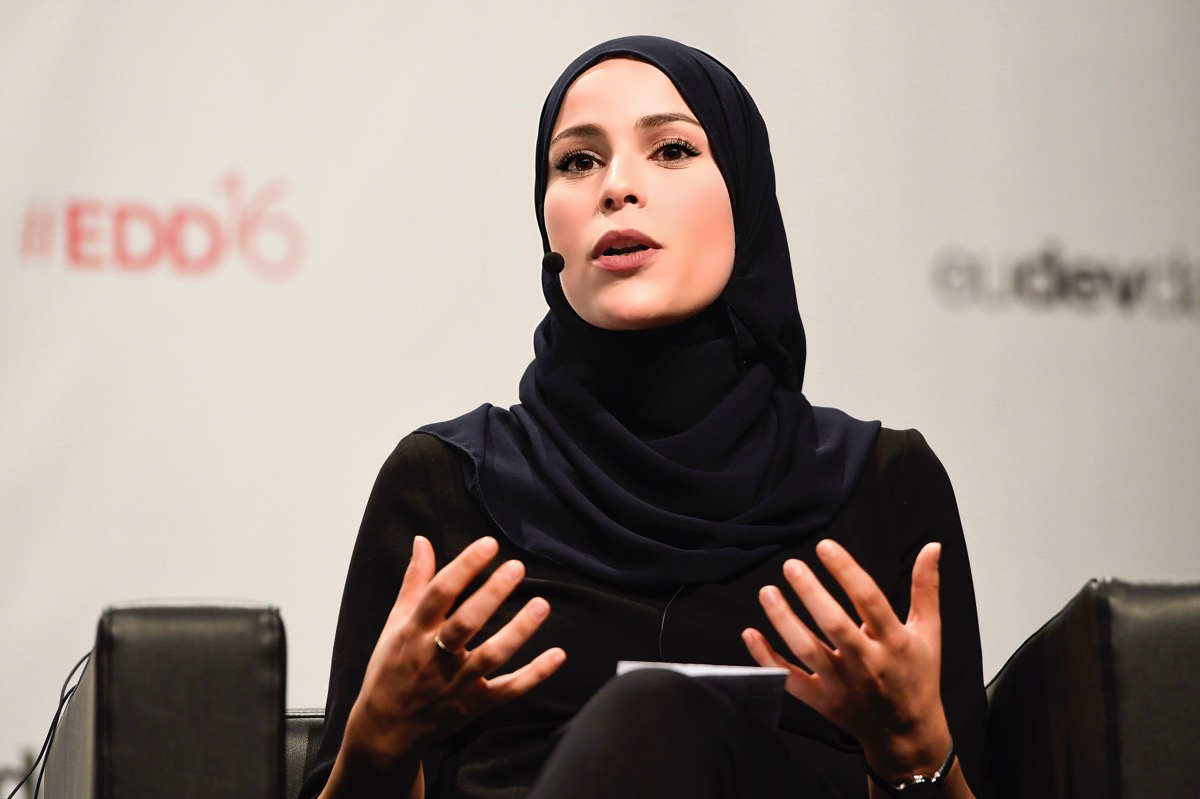
- Alaa Murabit at the European Development Days 2016
- Born: 26 October 1989 (age 37); Canada
- Education: London School of Economics and Political Science; Al Zawiya University; Harvard University
- Occupations: Medical Doctor; Global Health Financing & Security Strategist, Policy Advisor, Women's Rights Advocate
- Known for: Founder Voice of Libyan Women; Founder For Mama/Every Pregnancy; Sustainable Development Goal Global Advocate; United Nations High Level Commissioner
- Board member of: Girls Not Brides Chair; Women for Women International; Gavi; Malala Fund; International Alert
- Awards: TIME 100; Canadian Meritorious Service Cross; Harvard Radcliffe Fellow; Nobel Peace Prize Nominee (2012, 2017) (See full list)
- Honours: Meritorious Service Cross
- Website: alaamurabit.com

Alaa Murabit M.D. (Arabic: آلاء المرابط; born October 1989) is a Libyan-Canadian physician, policy maker, and strategist focused on health, inclusive security, and sustainable development. In 2011, she created the Voice of Libyan Women at age 21 and played a key role in advancing multiple United Nations Security Council resolutions and the Sustainable Development Goals into global policy frameworks. In 2023, Murabit created For Mama (now Every Pregnancy), the first zakat-certified Muslim philanthropic collaborative for maternal and child health.

Murabit was appointed the youngest of the 17 Global Sustainable Development Goals (SDG) Advocates by the UN Secretary-General. Appointed in 2016, she has served as a UN High-Level Commissioner on Health, Employment, and Economic Growth. She was also the inaugural Director of Global Health Advocacy, Policy, and Communications at the Gates Foundation, where she led major global health and development initiatives.

At the Gates Foundation, Murabit led a global policy, program advocacy and resource mobilization portfolio, accountable for mobilizing billions of dollars for global health and development. She incepted the Beginnings Fund, a $600 million collaborative for maternal and child health.

Her 2015 TED Talk, “What My Religion Really Says About Women,” has been viewed over nine million times. It was featured by The New York Times, TED and others.

Murabit was awarded the Canadian Meritorious Service Cross, named to the TIME100 in 2024, and is a World Economic Forum Young Global Leader.

== Early life and education ==
Murabit was born and raised in Saskatoon, Saskatchewan, Canada, as the sixth of eleven children. She has stated that she initially had no plans to advocate for inclusive security or women's rights.

After completing high school at age 15, she moved with family members to Zawiya, Libya, in 2005. She studied at the College of Medicine at Al Zawiya University in Libya from 2006 to 2013 and worked at Zawiya Teaching Hospital and various makeshift clinics during the 2011 Libyan War. When the war began, her father became involved almost immediately with the rebels, providing medical care for rebel soldiers, appearing in SkyNews footage with Alex Crawford under the name "Dr. M" creating insecurity for her family.

Murabit received her Doctor of Medicine from Zawia University in 2013 and her master's in International Strategy and Diplomacy with distinction from the London School of Economics in 2016 with research focused on inclusive security, crisis response, and securitization. In 2020, Murabit was named a Radcliffe Fellow at Harvard University's Radcliffe Institute for Advanced Study, where she focused on inclusive peacebuilding, community-led response, and global security frameworks.

== Career ==
=== Voice of Libyan Women, The Noor Campaign and Community-led Crisis Response ===
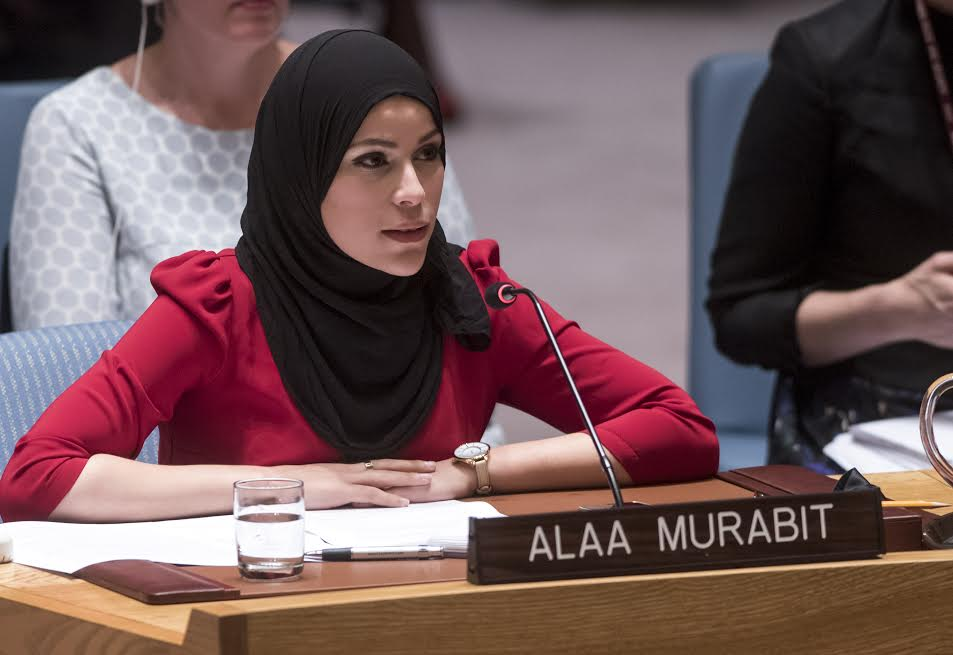
Alaa Murabit addresses the United Nations Security Council in October 2015

In 2011, while in medical school and during the Libyan Revolution, Murabit founded the Voice of Libyan Women (VLW), an organization focused on inclusive security during and after the Libyan Civil War. VLW launched the Noor Campaign, which engaged faith leaders in advocating for women's rights. VLW's Noor Campaign was the focus of Murabit's 2015 TED talk. Human Rights Watch described VLW's work as a "turning point in women's rights". The Noor Campaign is based on community leaders and "brought together over 600 local community leaders, including those who had never worked in civil society before". Working with a network of hundreds of community organizations throughout Libya, including Ayadina Charity in Benghazi, Mothers for Martyrs, and The Southern Women's Forum, the campaign reached over 35 cities and communities as far south as Ghat, Libya, on the southern Libyan border, Tobruk and Bayda on the Eastern border and Nalut and Ghadames in the west. The campaign and methodology have since been replicated internationally.

VLW's Noor Campaign was the focus of Murabit's 2015 TED talk. In May 2015, Murabit addressed an official TED audience, released in July 2015 as an official "Ted Talk of the Day". The New York Times selected it as one of the "4 moving TED Talks you should watch right now."

In 2013, Murabit spoke at the Women in the World Summit: "During the revolution, I saw phenomenally brave women taking a leading role," Murabit told Lesley Stahl. "Often when violence happens, people excuse it with religion," Murabit said. "Young girls need to know that they can fight fire with fire and say, 'No, my religion is not why you are doing this.'" She has maintained that peace is only achievable through communities.

=== Women, Peace, and Security ===
In 2012, Murabit became an International Criminal Court Hague-certified sexual and gender-based violence investigator. In July 2014, Murabit was appointed to the United Nations 1325 Advisory Board, which monitors the implementation of United Nations Security Council Resolution 1325 on women, peace, and security. In October 2015, Murabit was selected as the Speaker for the 15th Anniversary Open Debate of United Nations Security Council Resolution 1325.

In 2016, Murabit was appointed as a United Nations Sustainable Development Goals (SDG) Advocate by Secretary-General Ban Ki-Moon, following years of advocacy for the Goals, and appointed again by Secretary-General Antonio Guterres. In 2016, she was appointed as a UN High-Level Commissioner on Health, Employment, and Economic Growth.

Murabit has advised the UN Security Council on the Women, Peace, and Security (WPS) agenda, humanitarian crisis, and health security. She has worked extensively on integrating SDGs into global policy frameworks, advocated for numerous successful resolutions through the United Nations Security Council and General Assembly, including Resolutions 2122 (2013), 2242 (2015), 2467 (2019), and 2493 (2019). She was an expert advisor in the Carter Center's forums on the rights of women and girls alongside President Jimmy Carter and Nobel laureate Leymah Gbowee.

From 2016 to 2019, Murabit served as the Executive Director of Phase Minus 1, a global institute focused on preventing conflict escalation by addressing systemic root causes. She collaborated with policymakers, security experts, and grassroots leaders to develop governance, resilience, and crisis-response strategies in fragile and conflict-affected settings.

In 2017, Murabit was a founding member of The NewNow, a coalition of rising global leaders established to tackle contemporary global challenges modeled after The Elders. She created the Emerging Leaders Lab, a mentorship and leadership initiative supporting women community peacebuilders and social entrepreneurs, collaborating with organizations including Google, TED, Nike, ID-PR, and supporting leaders including Fawiza Farhan, Adwoa Aboah, Jaha Dukureh, and Roya Mahboob.

In September 2014 Murabit was named an Ashoka Fellow. She was an Advisor to UN Women Global Civil Society Advisory Group in 2014, and is a founding coalition member of Harvard University's "Everywoman, Everywhere" initiative.

=== Global health and development ===
==== IMPACT 2030 ====
From 2019 to 2021, Murabit served as the CEO of IMPACT 2030, leveraging private sector engagement for social impact and hosted "At The Table" podcast, interviewing global changemakers such as Malala Yousafzai, Layla Saad, Eddie Ndopu, Najwa Zebian, and Dr. Rana el Kaliouby. The podcast explored themes of inclusive leadership, social justice, and mental health, amplifying the voices of women and marginalized communities. She was an International Deliver for Good Influencer and a board member of International Alert, Keeping Children Safe, Malaria No More, and the Malala Fund.

==== Gates Foundation ====
In 2020, she joined the Gates Foundation as a Director of Global Policy and Advocacy, leading a $250 million global portfolio. Murabit led global advocacy and research for women's health, ideating and shaping the early strategy behind the $600 million Beginnings Fund for maternal and child health. In 2020, Murabit became a board member for Women for Women International, and in 2021 became an alternate board member for GAVI. Murabit established the foundation's Fragile, Conflict, and Violence-affected (FCV) Community of Practice and led its fragile-state assessment.

==== Girls Not Brides and the Lancet Commission ====
In October 2024, Murabit was announced as the new Chairperson of the Board of Girls Not Brides, leading the global partnership to end child marriage and was named a Commissioner for The Lancet Georgetown University Commission on Faith, Trust, and Health, which examines the role of faith actors and institutions in shaping health outcomes, trust in health systems, and community resilience across low- and middle-income countries. Murabit is a member of the World Economic Forum's Systemic Inequalities and Social Cohesion Council and serves as an advisor to Bain & Company. In July 2025, Murabit joined 500 Global as Managing Partner of Sustainable Growth, overseeing the firm's practice in sustainable development and blended finance across emerging markets.

=== Founding For Mama, Every Pregnancy and Islamic Social Finance ===
In 2022, while at the Gates Foundation, Murabit conceived and created a zakat-certified philanthropic initiative for maternal and child health. The initiative launched publicly during Ramadan 2024 as For Mama (later renamed Every Pregnancy), involving a coalition of over 35 partner organizations. In its first Ramadan campaign, For Mama raised over $13 million from donors in more than 130 countries. Its second campaign in 2025, under the name Every Pregnancy, raised over $21 million from nearly 38,000 donors. It became independent after Murabit spun it out of the Gates Foundation when she left in early 2025.

Writing in Project Syndicate and Devex, Murabit argued that Islamic social finance instruments are underutilized in global health financing.

== Publications and public engagement ==
Murabit has written articles for The Boston Globe, Wired, Project Syndicate, World Economic Forum, the Carter Center, NewAmerica, Chime for Change, Huffington Post, The Christian Science Monitor and Impakter. She is a contributing writer for the bestselling feminist anthology Feminists Don't Wear Pink (and other lies). In 2025, Murabit launched an online newsletter titled Radical Resilience.

Murabit has been featured in publications such as The New York Times, TIME, BBC, CNN, The Financial Times, The Lancet, and Vanity Fair and has spoken at leading international conferences including TED, World Economic Forum, WIRED, Munich Security Conference and Hilton Foundation Symposium.

== Awards and recognition ==
Murabit has received awards and recognition from governments, academic institutions, and international organizations.

In 2024, she was named to the TIME100, selected as a Lancet Global Leader and a Rockefeller Bellagio Fellow.

In 2022, she was recognized as a World Economic Forum Young Global Leader. Her leadership in inclusive security earned her the Harvard Law Women Inspiring Change Award (2017), and Forbes 30 Under 30 (2017).

She is the first civilian from Saskatchewan to receive the Canadian Meritorious Service Cross (2018) for her work in international peace and development and was honored as a Vanity Fair Global Goals Leader (2023). She was named a BBC Top 100 Woman (2014), received the TED Talk of the Day (2015) distinction, the Nelson Mandela Changemaker Award, the Marisa Bellisario International Humanitarian Award by the President of the Italian Republic (2013) and WIRED World Global Thought leader.

She received the James Joyce Award (2019). In 2018, she was named one of 100 Women of Impact by the Government of Canada, recognizing the most influential women in Canadian history and as one of Canada's nine Trailblazers in 2020. In 2019, she was named one of the World's Top 20 Most Influential People in Gender Policy. In 2013, she was named the New York Times TrustWomen Hero. Murabit has been described as a Nobel Peace Prize nominee in media coverage.

Murabit was inducted into the Institute for Inclusive Security Women Waging Peace in 2012, an Ashoka Fellow in 2014, and an MIT Media Lab Fellow in 2016. She has addressed the United Nations Security Council and General Assembly, European Council, African Union, COP, and other global fora numerous times

In 2026 she was awarded the WIN WIN Gothenburg Sustainability Award as "one of the most influential voices for gender equality of our time".

== See also ==
- List of peace activists
