= Marcia Pappas =

Marcia Pappas is the New York State president of the National Organization for Women.

She has been called "the most visible activist in New York State" and has said that Sarah Palin’s nomination as the 2008 Republican vice presidential candidate was "an obvious play for the support that Hillary Clinton got in the primaries."

In support of Clinton, she wrote a press release entitled "Psychological Gang Bang of Hillary is Proof We Need a Woman President", likening the reaction of Barack Obama and John Edwards to a gang rape. Pappas was strongly critical of the Stupak-Pitts Amendment, which places limits on taxpayer-funded abortions in the context of the November 2009 Affordable Health Care for America Act.
