= Edgar Steele =

American lawyer

Edgar James Steele
- Born: July 5, 1945; Brewster, WashingtonU.S.
- Died: September 4, 2014 (aged 69); USP Victorville, Victorville, California, U.S.
- Occupations: Writer, disbarred lawyer
- Criminal charge: Conspiracy to commit murder
- Criminal penalty: 50 years' imprisonment
- Spouse: Cyndi Steele

Edgar James Steele (July 5, 1945 – September 4, 2014) was an American author and former trial attorney from Idaho, best known for serving as the defense attorney for Richard G. Butler, the founder of the white supremacist group Aryan Nations. He was a graduate of UCLA Law School and the University of California, Berkeley Haas School of Business.

On June 11, 2010, Steele and another man were arrested and charged in connection with a murder-for-hire plot to kill Steele's wife Cyndi and her mother. He was found guilty and sentenced to 50 years in prison. Steele died in prison in September 2014, three years into his sentence.

== Notable cases ==
Steele defended Aryan Nations leader Richard Butler in a 2000 lawsuit, which he ultimately lost. In another case, Steele challenged Idaho's hate crime laws by defending Lonny Rae, a man who had been charged with malicious harassment for shouting "nigger" at a black referee who had injured Rae's wife, Kimberly (a reporter for a local newspaper), while he was trying to prevent her from taking a photograph following a high school football match. Steele argued that the law breached the constitutional right to free speech under the First Amendment. Rae was cleared of the harassment charge but he was sentenced to seven days imprisonment for assault. In 2004, Rae's conviction was overturned on appeal, which was also handled by Steele. Steele also formerly worked as a spokesman for Prussian Blue, a female white supremacist pop music duo that was active in the mid-2000s.

== Defensive Racism ==
In 2005, Steele published Defensive Racism: An Unapologetic Examination of Racial Differences, a book in which he described his views on the differences between the races of the world, and questioned the motives of people who espouse political correctness.

== Arrest for conspiracy to commit murder ==
In June 2010, Steele's handyman, Larry Fairfax, informed authorities that Steele was soliciting the murders of his wife and his mother-in-law in a murder-for-hire plot. The FBI wired Fairfax for sound for a meeting between Fairfax and Steele so the plot could be discussed. Thereafter, Steele was arrested for conspiracy to commit murder.

Subsequently, when Steele was already in police custody, a pipebomb was found under his wife's car when she took it in for an oil change, which brought the Bureau of Alcohol, Tobacco, and Firearms into the case, and Fairfax was arrested. The charging document for Fairfax's arrest includes an admission that he manufactured and installed the bomb. Fairfax was given a 27-month prison sentence, and was transferred to home confinement in April 2012.

=== Trial ===
When Steele was arrested, a federal public defender, Roger Peven, was initially appointed for him. In July 2010, Steele's supporters put up a website in an attempt to solicit donations and hire a private attorney for him. By February 2011, they had raised over $120,000 for this purpose, and they hired leading Denver attorney Robert T. McAllister, as well as local Idaho attorney Gary Amendola. Steele remained incarcerated in Spokane, Washington, and Bonner County, Idaho while awaiting trial. He was relocated to Boise, Idaho, for his trial, which began on April 28, 2011. At the time of the trial, McAllister was in the process of being disbarred for converting the funds of a client to his own use.

Prosecutor Traci Whelan questioned Steele's wife Cyndi regarding her marital troubles with him. In 2000, Cyndi had caught her husband looking for women in California on match.com; she posted her own profile with a fake name and got him to reply, after which she filed for divorce. In her petition, she asked for numerous damages, including child support payments of $1,400 per month, two of the family's vehicles, and their horse ranch in Sagle, Idaho. Though Steele and Cyndi were reconciled a few months later, the prosecution used this evidence to argue that Steele was unsatisfied with his marriage and he had a motive to kill his wife because he wanted a new partner.

Steele's computer was seized when he was arrested. Under questioning, Cyndi stated that her husband had sent 14,000 emails to a large number of Ukrainian women between January and June 2010 as part of his research on a Russian bride scam which was centered in Florida. Each of the women had received at least 10 emails or 100 instant messages. The prosecutor argued that this evidence showed that Steele wanted a new partner, and he had a motive to kill his current wife.

The prosecutor introduced several love letters which Steele had written and sent to his supposed Ukrainian girlfriend Tatyana Loginova from his jail cell while he was awaiting trial. These letters were signed by Steele and they were admitted as evidence in court without any objection from Steele's attorney. In one of the letters, Steele expressed his wish to live with Loginova:

You could, perhaps, go to school in Panama, if you like, or summer school in Ukraine, or we could find you something to do – work at something, language instructions [sic]? Take care of our babies, make love to me, whatever will make you happy. You get to be near friends, family for half of every year. I get the same for three months each year. We both get to be warm for the winter, which can be like a huge, extended vacation each year. Our kids learn both Russian and English as they grow up. It sounds great to me. What do you think, my love?

Loginova was later questioned over a video link from Ukraine. The prosecutor argued that Steele desired to be with Loginova in Ukraine, and thus, he had a motive to kill his wife.

=== Conviction and sentencing ===
On May 5, 2011, after an extended deliberation, the jury of eleven women and one man found Steele guilty of all four counts, in the indictment, they were described as follows: (1) use of interstate commerce to commission murder for hire, (2) possession of a destructive device in relation to a crime of violence, (3) use of explosive material to commit a federal felony, and (4) tampering with a witness. In an interview after the trial ended, Steele's wife gave a passionate and critical assessment of the prosecution, judge and case elements. Steele's sentencing hearing was held on November 9, 2011, in Coeur d'Alene, Idaho. After making a statement in his own defense, he was sentenced to 50 years' imprisonment. Until his death, he was interned in Victorville, California.

As a result of these convictions, he was disbarred from the practice of law by the State Bar of California on January 30, 2014.

== Death ==
Edgar Steele died in prison at the age of 69 on September 4, 2014, after suffering from declining health for several weeks.
