= Aasiya Zubair =

American television executive

- Born: June 17, 1972
- Died: February 12, 2009 (aged 36); United States
- Occupation: Architect
- Spouse: Muzzammil Hassan

Aasiya Zubair, also known as Aasiya Hassan (June 17, 1972 – February 12, 2009) was a TV broadcaster. She was married to Muzzammil Hassan, the Pakistani-American co-founder and owner of Bridges TV, the first American Muslim English-language television network. In February 2009, she was found dead, beheaded, at the Bridges TV station in Orchard Park, New York after her estranged husband turned himself in to a police station and was charged with second-degree murder.

== Career ==
Zubair was an architect by training. Worried by the negative perceptions of Muslims, she "felt there should be an American Muslim media where her kids could grow up feeling really strong about their identity as an American Muslim" and came up with the idea for Bridges TV. She also studied for a Master of Business Administration at State University of New York at Buffalo from 2007 to 2009.

Zubair was the focus of a cover story in the Vol. 3, Issue 2 (2003) issue of Azizah Magazine; her face appeared on the cover.

== Murder ==
Muzzamill Hassan lured Zubair to the television studio where they worked together, on February 12, 2009. He attacked her with two hunting knives, stabbing her forty one times and finally severing her head. Zubair had filed for divorce a week prior to her murder.

== Legacy ==
In addition to her pioneering work as a broadcaster, Zubair is being remembered as a catalyst for heightened awareness of the issue of domestic violence, especially in the North American Muslim community. Wajahat Ali, acclaimed playwright and founder of GoatMilk, wrote in The Guardian that "[t]he absolute brutality of Aasiya's murder has served as a clarion call to many American Muslims who have passionately responded to the tragedy with a resounding desire to confront this festering calamity." Imam Mohamed Hagmagid Ali, vice-president of The Islamic Society of North America, stated: "This is a wake up call to all of us, that violence against women is real and can not be ignored. It must be addressed collectively by every member of our community."

A nationwide, unified effort entitled "Imams Speak Out: Domestic Violence Will Not Be Tolerated in Our Communities" commenced in February 2009 asking all imams and religious leaders to discuss the Zubair murder, as well as domestic violence, in their weekly sermon on their Friday prayer services.

On February 7, 2011, Muzzammil Hassan was found guilty of second degree murder for beheading his wife of eight years, Aasiya Zubair. He was sentenced to 25 years to life imprisonment. He is currently serving time at the Clinton Correctional Facility, Dannemora.

In 2012, the first International Purple Hijab Day was celebrated to call attention to domestic violence against women. Alaa Murabit, founder of The Voice of Libyan Women, said that "Purple Hijab Day directly contests a Muslim's falsely perceived right to abuse a wife, daughter, mother, or sister." International Purple Hijab Day is celebrated the second Saturday in February in order to honor the memory of Zubair.

== See also ==
- Muzzammil Hassan: Reaction to Arrest
