= Muslim Public Affairs Council =

US Muslim advocacy and public policy group

- Formation: 1988
- Type: 501(c)(3) organization
- Tax ID no.: 95-4185142
- Purpose: Policy advocacy agency
- Headquarters: Los Angeles; Washington, D.C.
- Region served: United States
- President: Salam Al-Marayati
- Main organ: Board of Directors
- Affiliations: Muslim Public Affairs Council
- Website: www.mpac.org
- Formerly called: Political Action Committee of the Islamic Center of Southern California

The Muslim Public Affairs Council (MPAC) is a national American Muslim advocacy and public policy organization headquartered in Los Angeles and with offices in Washington, D.C. MPAC was founded in 1988.

According to the organization's website, MPAC seeks to correct misperceptions and improve public understanding and policies that affect American Muslims by engaging directly with key members of the government, media and local communities. The group has been criticized by MuslimMatters.org for taking charity in violation of the Quran and for joining an Amicus Brief in the Gerald Lynn Bostock v. Clayton County, Georgia case.

== History ==
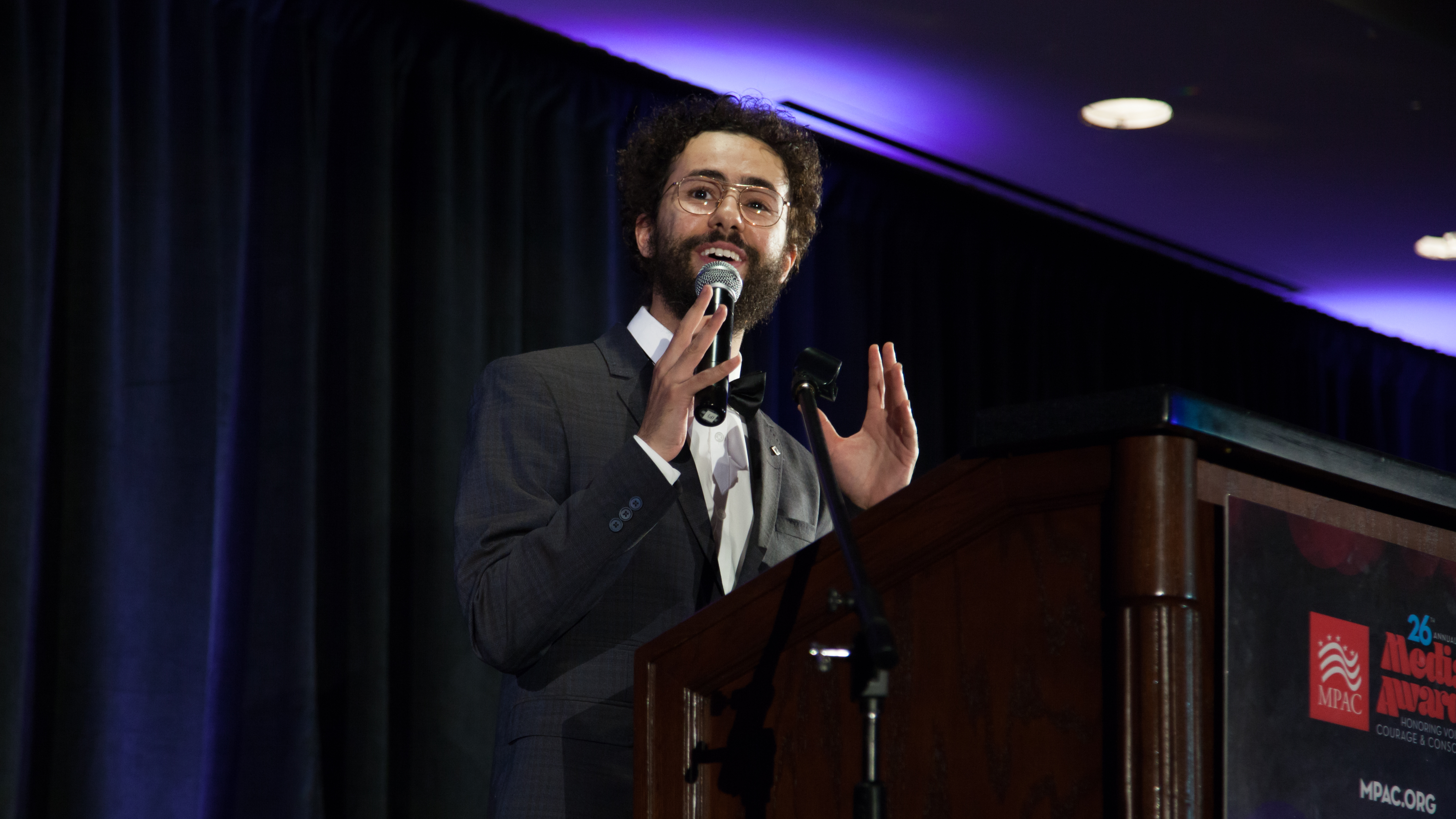
Ramy Youssef speaks to the Muslim Public Affairs Council in 2017.

The Muslim Public Affairs Council (MPAC) was founded in 1988 at the Islamic Center of Southern California."

In its history, it has condemned the death fatwa against Salman Rushdie and the attacks on the World Trade Center, and denounced the Taliban and Osama bin Laden.

In January 2023, MPAC issued a statement defending a professor who was fired from Hamline University in Minnesota for showing a painting of Muhammad in an art class.

== See also ==
- Anti-Defamation League
- Council on American–Islamic Relations
