= Jude Kelly =

English theatre director (born 1954)

Jude Kelly CBE
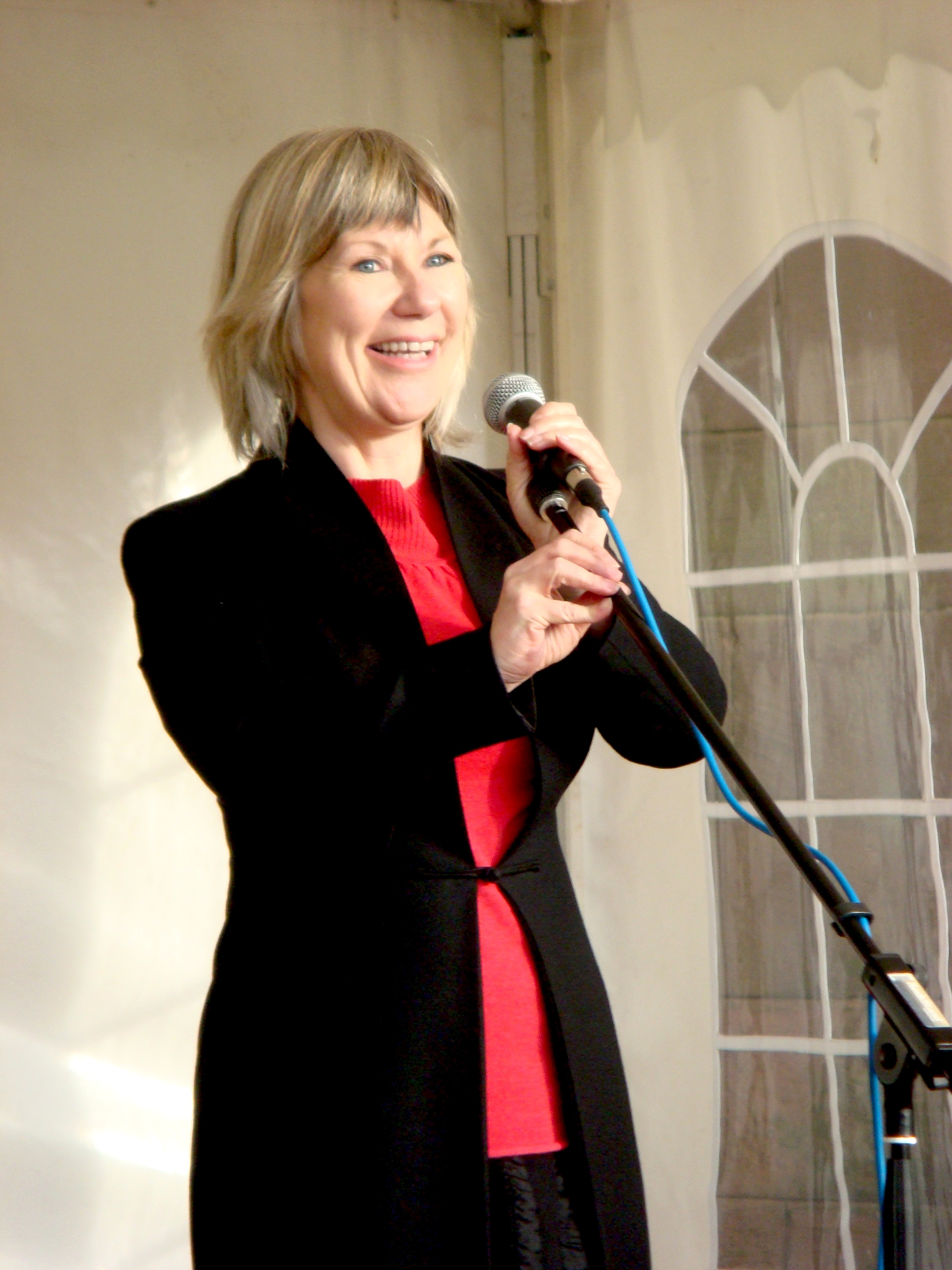
- Kelly in 2008
- Born: Judith Pamela Kelly; March 1954 (age 72); Liverpool, Lancashire, England
- Education: Calder High School for Girls/Quarry Bank Comprehensive School; The University of Birmingham (BA)
- Occupations: Theatre director and producer
- Notable work: Founder of the Women of the World Festival (WOW)
- Spouse(s): Michael Bird, m. 1993
- Children: 3, including Caroline Bird
- Kelly's voice recorded 2012, as part of an audio description for VocalEyes

Judith "Jude" Pamela Kelly, CBE (born March 1954), is a British theatre director and producer. She founded the annual Women of the World Festival in 2010. From 2006 to 2018, she was Artistic Director of the Southbank Centre in London. Since 2025, she has been Master of St Catherine's College, Oxford.

== Early life and education ==
Jude Kelly was born in Liverpool, and her love of theatre dates back to her childhood there, where she would put on plays in her backyard with the neighbours' children: "I've always had a passion for telling a story," she has said. She attended Calder High School for Girls until she was 13, when it became part of Quarry Bank Comprehensive School, where she was taught by John Lennon's old headmaster, William Pobjoy, who encouraged his pupils to be creative. Already determined to become a director, she studied drama at the University of Birmingham, one of a small number of single honours degree courses available at the time. Kelly graduated in 1975 with a BA in Drama and Theatre Arts from Birmingham, where she was a contemporary of comedian, writer and actress Victoria Wood.

== Career ==
Kelly founded Solent People's Theatre, a touring company, in 1976, and was artistic director of the Battersea Arts Centre from 1980 to 1985. She became the founding director of the West Yorkshire Playhouse from 1990 to 2002, where as artistic director and then CEO she established it as an acknowledged centre for excellence. As the artistic director, she sat on the National Advisory Committee for Culture, Creativity and Education (NACCCE), led by Ken Robinson, that in 1999 wrote the All Our Futures report, which led to significant government investment in young people's creative and cultural education.

She has directed more than 100 productions, including for Chichester Festival Theatre, the English National Opera (ENO), the Châtelet in Paris, France, and London's West End.

Kelly left the West Yorkshire Playhouse in 2002 to found Metal Culture, providing artistic laboratory spaces in Liverpool, Peterborough and Southend, funded by Arts Council England and local authorities. Metal provides a platform where creative hunches and ideas can be pursued; it promotes cross-art collaborations and projects to affect the built environment, people, communities and philosophies.

Among her many successes as a director, Kelly's production of the stage musical Singin' in the Rain transferred to the Royal National Theatre as one of the National's visiting productions and was awarded the Laurence Olivier Award for Outstanding Musical Production in 2001. She directed Sir Ian McKellen in The Seagull and The Tempest, Patrick Stewart in Johnson Over Jordan and Othello, Dawn French in When We Are Married, and the English National Opera in The Elixir of Love (South Bank Award – Newcomer Opera) and On the Town, which was the ENO's most successful production at the time, Carmen Jones, and The Wizard of Oz at the refurbished Royal Festival Hall. Kelly directed Paco Peña's Flamenco sin Fronteras in 2009.

In 2006, she became Artistic Director of the Southbank Centre in central London, Britain's largest cultural institution. The Centre consists of the Royal Festival Hall, the Hayward Gallery, Queen Elizabeth Hall (containing the Purcell Room), and the Saison Poetry Library. Southbank Centre also manages the Arts Council Collection and organises the National Touring Exhibitions programme in venues throughout the UK. Kelly's decision to step down as artistic director after 12 years, in order to devote herself to WOW, was announced in January 2018.

Kelly has represented Britain within UNESCO on cultural matters, served on the Arts Advisory Committee for the Royal Society of Arts, and jointly chaired with Lord Puttnam the Curricula Advisory Committee on Arts and Creativity. She is chair of Metal, a member of the London Cultural Consortium, and a member of the Dishaa Advisory Group. She previously sat on the board of Creativity, Culture and Education (CCE) when it ran the government's flagship creative learning programme, Creative Partnerships, funded by the government with £40m per year by the education and cultural departments, working in one in five schools in England, reaching more than 1 million young people over 10 years. She is Chair of the Trustees for World Book Night and was on the Cultural Olympiad Board that was responsible for delivering the creative, cultural and educational aspects of London's Olympic and Paralympic Games in 2012. Despite her involvement in these significant investments by the UK government in the preceding ten years, in 2013, she claimed that no action had been taken by the state relating to young people's cultural education since the 1999 NACCCE report or the Henley Review in 2012.

Her 2018 production of Leonard Bernstein's MASS at the Royal Festival Hall was described by one critic as a "wasted opportunity".

Kelly's talk at a 2016 TED conference, Why women should tell the stories of humanity, has been viewed more than 1.1 million times as of July 2018.

In December 2024, St Catherine's College, Oxford, announced that Kelly would be the next Master of the College from April 2025.

She is visiting professor at Kingston University, Leeds University and at Shanghai Performing Arts School.

=== Festivals ===
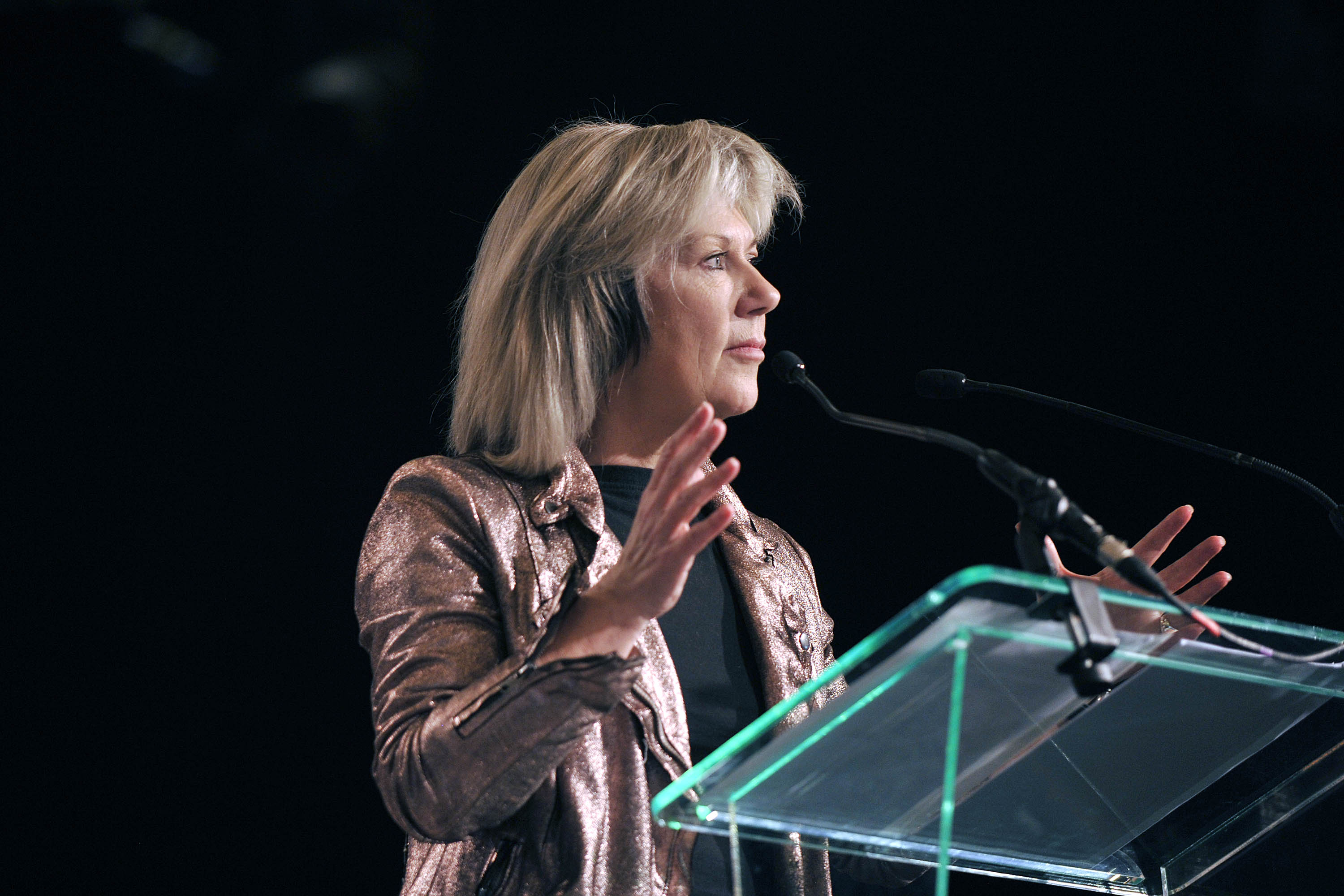
Kelly speaking at the Women of the World Festival in 2014

In 2010, she founded the Women of the World Festival (WOW), first held in the Southbank Centre, which celebrates the achievements of women and girls as well as looking at the obstacles they face, and which is now an annual international event.

In 2014, she founded the Being a Man Festival (BAM), also held in the Southbank Centre, a UK-based festival that addresses the challenges and pressures of masculine identity in the 21st century.

=== Financial education ===
Alongside Olga Miler Christen, Kelly founded Smartpurse Limited in 2019 in order to provide financial advice and education to women.

== Personal life ==
Kelly has a daughter – the poet and playwright Caroline Bird (born 1986) – and two sons, one of whom died young. She married their father, the actor, writer and director Michael Bird (stage name Birch) in 1993.

== Recognition and awards ==
In 2006, Kelly was named number 8 in "Theatreland's top 100 players" by The Independent newspaper.

In October 2012, Kelly was presented with a BASCA Gold Badge Award in recognition of her services to music.

In February 2013, she was assessed as one of the 100 most powerful women in the United Kingdom by Woman's Hour on BBC Radio 4, and also recognized as one of the BBC's 100 Women.

Already Officer of the Order of the British Empire (OBE), she was appointed Commander of the Order of the British Empire (CBE) in the 2015 New Year Honours for services to the arts.

In September 2018, to mark Time Out magazine's 50th anniversary, she was one of 50 people featured as helping to shape London's cultural landscape and "make the city awesome".

Kelly's name is one of those featured on the sculpture Ribbons, unveiled in Leeds in 2024 to commemorate women with links to the city.
