= Milk and Honey (poetry collection) =

Poetry book by Rupi Kaur

- First edition
- Author: Rupi Kaur
- Language: English
- Genre: Instapoetry
- Publisher: Andrews McMeel Publishing
- Publication date: November 4, 2014
- Publication place: Canada
- Pages: 226 pp (hardcover)
- ISBN: 9781449496364
- Followed by: The Sun and Her Flowers

Milk and Honey (stylized in all lowercase as "milk and honey") is a collection of both abstract fiction and non-fiction poetry and prose by Indian-Canadian poet Rupi Kaur. The collection's themes feature aspects of survival, feminism and relationships, and is divided into four sections, with each section serving a different purpose and relevance to Kaur's personal experiences. The sections further explore the themes of violence, abuse, love, loss, and femininity, accompanied by simple line art illustrations. These sections are titled "the hurting", "the loving", "the breaking" and "the healing". Kaur has cited her cultural background as an inspiration for the book's style, as well as an attempt to make the book more accessible to a wide demographic or readers. The book's simplistic style and themes have drawn forth some negative criticism and alleged rumours about Kaur herself. Critics have sometimes referred to Kaur's work as "Instapoetry" due to Kaur's usage of social media platform Instagram to market her poems and illustrations.

== Background ==
Kaur was born in India and later moved to Canada at the age of four. Her household continued to center the values of the Punjabi-Sikhs people as they spoke only the Punjabi language at home. After arriving in Canada, at the age of 5, Kaur began reading, drawing, writing poetry, and painting because she could not speak English and struggled to make friends. Kaur eventually learned English by the fourth grade and credited her love for spoken word poetry to community open microphone nights. As she got older, she continued reciting her poems at open mic events and gathered a group of followers who showed interest in Kaur expanding her poems in the book.

== Contents ==
Milk and Honey is divided into 4 themed chapters: "the hurting," (30 poems), "the loving," (32 poems), "the breaking," (60 poems), and "the healing," (57 poems). Some of the singular poems, which follow the theme of the overall section, have drawings by Kaur. This collection uses sexual terminology, accessible language, and discusses personal trauma. The book itself is recommended for ages 18+. Kaur jumps between first and second-person pronouns, and breaks the conventional rules of traditional poetry to honor Punjabi, the language of her birthplace. She writes with lowercase letters and uses little punctuation similar to the writing features in Punjabi.

The first chapter, "the hurting," is about the author's experience with sexual assault, abuse, and family issues. The next chapter, "the loving," has a lighter tone as the topic overall is about positive experiences. The poems have been described by critics as sweet, and being filled with the emotions of falling in love with love and life. "The breaking" brings the reader back to a dark place in the author's life. These poems relate to Kaur's sad feeling after a breakup. While speaking about the effects after love is gone, Kaur discusses a break-up to-do list. The last chapter, "the healing," is an attempt to comfort and show women that they should embrace who they are and that they are valuable, no matter what they had to endure. This section also speaks to embracing one's emotions as they are important to improving one's internal strength and abilities.

== Publication ==
Milk and Honey was published on November 4, 2014. The poetry collection has sold over 3 million times. As of June 7, 2020, it has been listed on The New York Times Best Seller list for 165 weeks, and has helped Kaur to amass a large following on social media. Kaur was not able to find a publisher, so, having learned how to design and edit in college, she decided to self-publish Milk and Honey. The book was later re-released under Andrews McMeel Publishing. It has also been translated into 25 languages.

== Reception ==
Kaur's poetry has been described as easy and simple to read, not intellectually demanding, 'pabulum' and it is credited with changing people's views of poetry, because "she tells it how it is", according to Rob Walker of The Guardian. The book received criticism regarding its reliance on the style of "InstaPoetry", with Bustle stating that Kaur and the book have "by far borne the brunt of these critiques. For every positive review of Kaur's work there is at least one scathing critique, ranging from actual engagement with her writing to cheap shots claiming she has commodified her South Asian heritage." Critic John Maher of Publishers Weekly has described Kaur as a "polarizing figure" for literacy, publishing, and media, who might be able to make poems sell again. Maher stated that while a 2015 survey reported a drop in poetry reading between 1992 and 2012, poetry sales figures doubled in 2017, two years after Kaur published Milk and Honey.

Chiara Giovanni critiqued Kaur's ability to be a representative for female empowerment, stating, "'there is something deeply uncomfortable about the self-appointed spokesperson of South Asian womanhood being a privileged young woman from the West'". The book also received criticism over claims that Kaur's work plagiarized that of Nayyirah Waheed. Critics cited similarities between the two poets' writing style of short poems with jagged punctuation and line breaks, and for the same imagery.

=== Censorship in the United States ===
In February 2022, Milk and Honey was listed as #47 on a list of 50 books that "conservative" parents wanted banned from public schools in the state of Texas. Kaur called the ban "disturbing" during an interview with CTV News. The book was banned in multiple school districts in Missouri in 2023 and was ordered removed from public school libraries in Utah in 2024. PEN America listed the book as one of the 11 most banned books in the 2022–2023 school year because it explores issues of sexual assault and violence. About the bans, Kaur wrote on Instagram, "I remember sitting in my school library in high school, turning to books about sexual assault because I didn't have anyone else to turn to. This is the reality for many students."
