= Women of the World Festival =

Annual arts and science festival and global feminist movement, based in London

- Founded: 8 March 2010
- Founder: Jude Kelly
- Major events: Celebrates the achievements of women and girls and highlights the obstacles they face
- President: Queen Camilla
- Website: www.thewowfoundation.com

WOW – Women of the World Festival (WOW, WOW Festival) is a network of arts festivals that celebrate the achievements of women and girls as well as highlighting the obstacles that face them, and is part of a global feminist movement. The WOW Foundation spearheads the festivals and forms partnerships to hold WOW festivals across the world.

== History ==
The festival was founded in London in 2010 by Jude Kelly, a theatre director who was at that time artistic director of the Southbank Centre. In her own words, she felt that the feminist movement was "in a lull" at that time, and that it needed something to revitalise it.

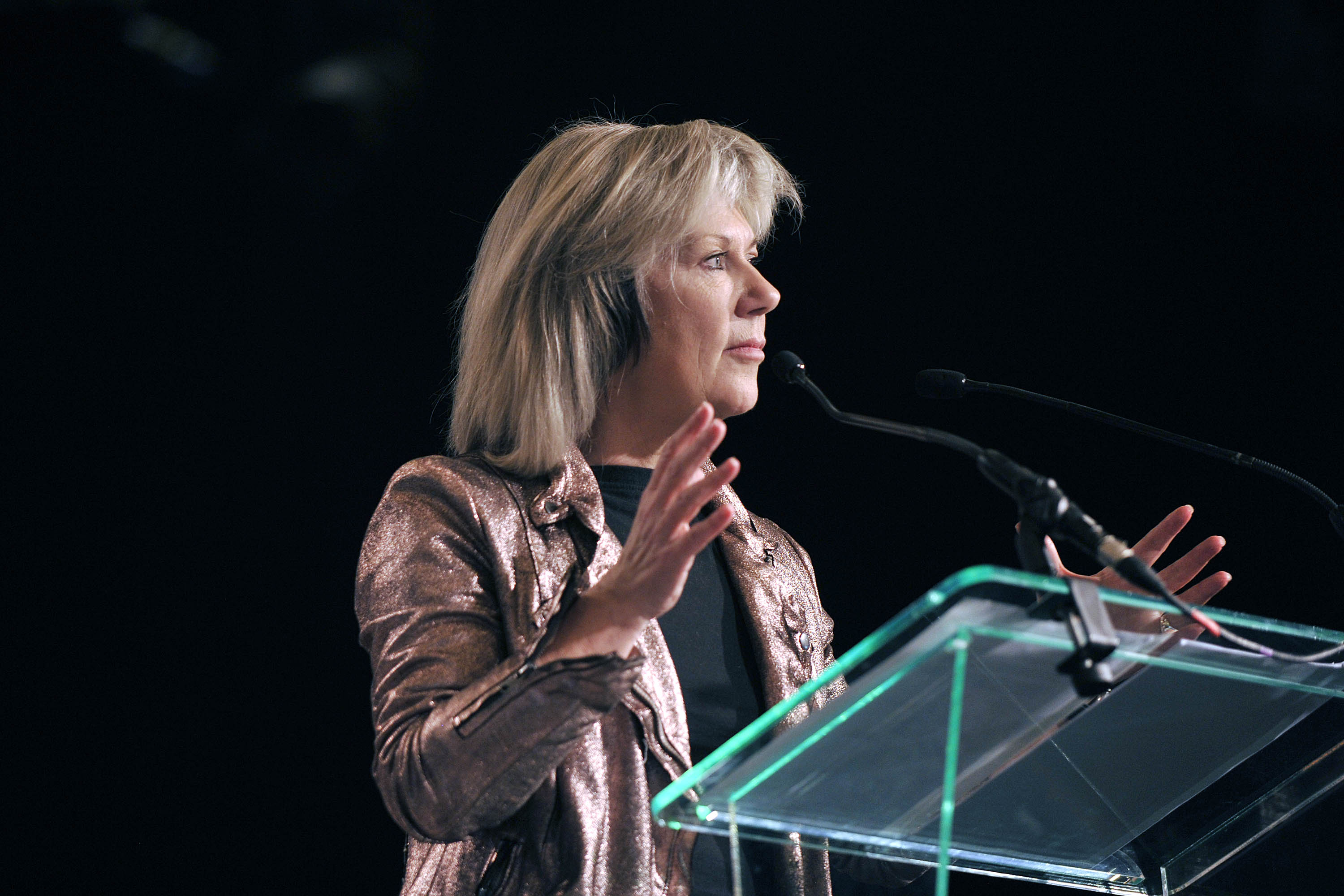
Jude Kelly speaking at the 2014 festival

Since 2015, Queen Camilla has been WOW's president. In 2015, the BBC broadcast Woman's Hour from the London festival. By 2018, there had been 42 WOW festivals in 23 countries.

The WOW Foundation became an independent charity in 2018, with Kelly as its first director. She stepped down from her position at the Southbank Centre in May 2018, in order to concentrate on WOW.

In 2020, the festival's tenth edition featured an address by Camilla (then Duchess of Cornwall). In May of that year, the WOW Foundation ran a two-day online event in partnership with BBC Arts and a 24-hour marathon festival called WOW Global 24, with participants from around the world, which was produced in-house.

In March 2021, as the effects of the COVID-19 pandemic continued to be felt, the festival moved online.

In 2023, WOW launched its first WOW Girls Festival.

== Events ==
WOW Festivals take place all year round in various locations. The WOW London Festival takes place over several days in early March, around International Women's Day. WOW includes talks, debates, music, comedy, performances and mentoring sessions on a range of themes and topics.

At first, the festival's principal venue was the Southbank Centre in London. There are also festivals in many other locations, both within the UK and throughout the world. As of 2019 these included the cities of Cambridge, Liverpool, Cardiff, Leeds, New York City, Rio de Janeiro, Hargeysa (Somaliland), Alexandria, Beijing, Athens, Karachi, and Istanbul, as well as in Finland and several locations in Australia, Bangladesh and Nepal.

In the United States, the 2021 festival at New York was described as the fifth bi-annual event. A further festival, headlined by Olympic gymnast Dominique Dawes, was held at Baltimore in 2025.

=== WOW Australia ===
The first WOW event was held in Katherine, Northern Territory, in 2013. Subsequent events have been held in that town, as well as Melbourne and various cities in Queensland. After an initial event in Brisbane, Queensland, in 2015, WOW Australia has been based in that city since 2021 (having had to cancel the 2020 event owing to the COVID-19 pandemic). It is a three-year collaboration between Queensland Performing Arts Centre (Southbank Centre) and the non-profit Of One Mind, and supported by the Queensland Government.

WOW has worked with Aboriginal and Torres Strait Islander women and is a supporter of the Uluru Statement from the Heart.

=== WOW Athens ===
WOW Athens is the Greek edition of the global Women of the World Festival, hosted annually at the Stavros Niarchos Foundation Cultural Center (SNFCC) in Athens. Since its introduction in 2023, the festival has become an established component of the SNFCC's cultural programming, centering on issues affecting women, girls, and non‑binary people across diverse social contexts. Early editions featured contributions from significant feminist actors, including the Guerrilla Girls, whose interventions have been widely noted for their critique of structural gender inequalities in the arts; Elena Favili, creator of Rebel Girls, inspiring young readers with stories of trailblazing women; Nadya Tolokonnikova of Pussy Riot, whose political art challenges authoritarianism; acclaimed author Deborah Levy; art historian Katie Hessel, who champions women artists through her work; celebrated writer and commentator Roxane Gay; genre-defying author Carmen Maria Machado; poet Nikita Gill among others.

The 2026 edition foregrounds questions of visibility, inclusion, and representation within both Greek society and broader international frameworks. The thematic scope encompasses the rise of conservative gender‑related movements, the lived experiences of women and non‑binary individuals in educational and professional environments, the persistence of gender stereotypes in cultural sectors such as cinema and sport, and emergent ethical and social challenges posed by artificial intelligence, gaming, and new technologies and includes contributions from Tarana J. Burke, the founder of the MeToo movement; author and social commentator Rumena Bužarovska, Indian-born British Bangladeshi social economist Naila Kabeer, curator and researcher Ekaterina Juskowski, pianist Tania Giannouli, musician and activist Imany.

== See also ==
- Being a Man Festival
