= Mateer =

Mateer is a surname. Notable people with the surname include:

- Calvin Wilson Mateer (1836–1908), American Presbyterian missionary
- Diehl Mateer (1928–2012), American hardball squash player and tennis player
- Jeff Mateer, American lawyer
- John Mateer (born 1971), South African-born Australian poet and author
- John Mateer (American football), American football player
- Trista Mateer, American poet
