= Rupi Kaur =

Indian-Canadian poet (born 1992)

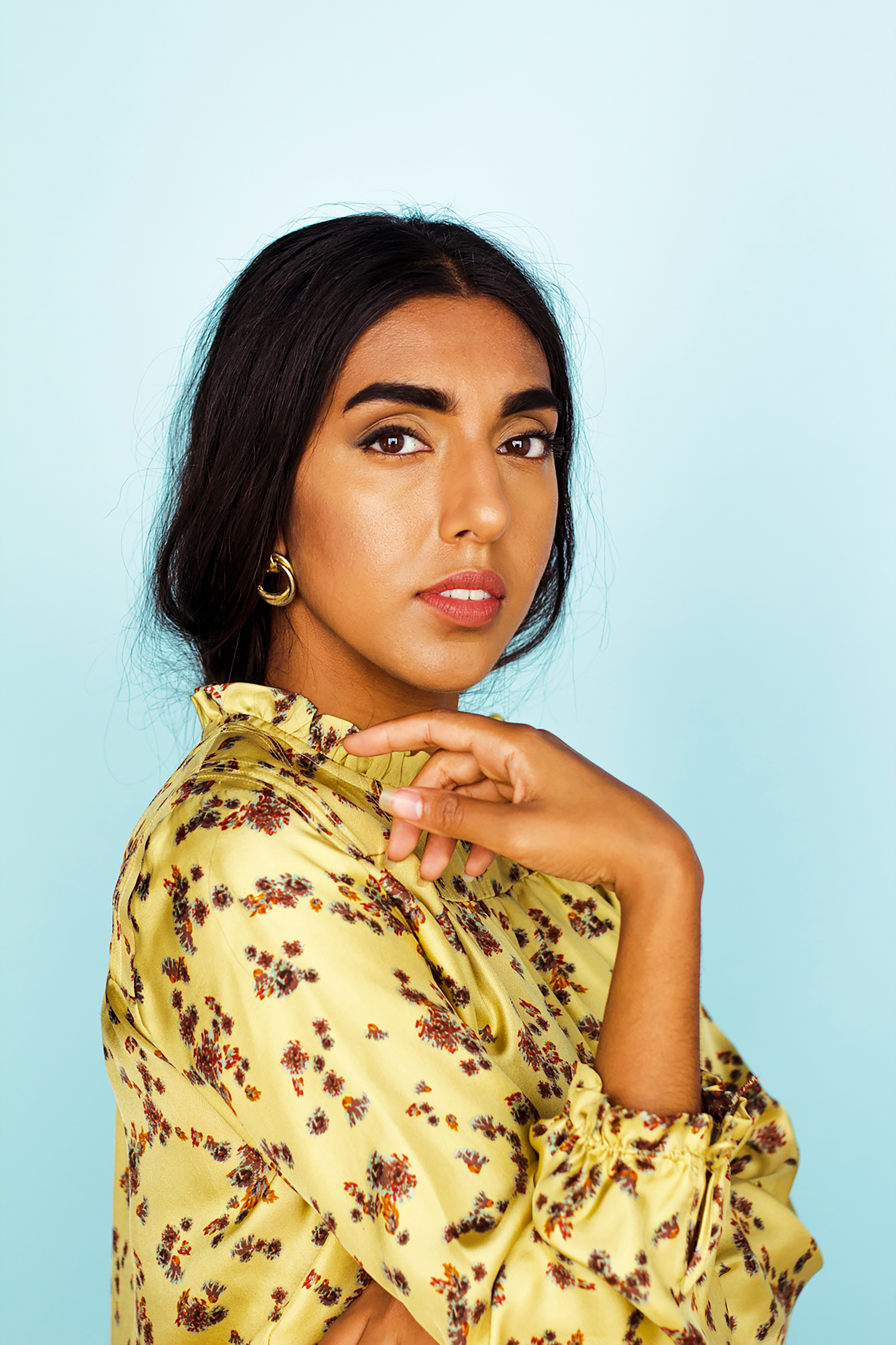
- Kaur in 2016
- Born: 4 October 1992 (age 34); Punjab, India
- Education: University of Waterloo (BA)
- Occupations: Author, poet, artist, illustrator, performer
- Writing career
- Genre: Feminist poetry • Instapoetry • Punjabi diaspora poetry
- Website: rupikaur.com

Rupi Kaur (Note: pronounced in English: /ˌruːpiː ˈkɔːr/ ROO-pee KOR) (Punjabi: ਰੂਪੀ ਕੌਰ; born 4 October 1992) is an Indian-Canadian poet, illustrator, photographer, and author. Born in Punjab, India, Kaur immigrated to Canada at a young age with her family. She began performing poetry in 2009 and rose to fame on Instagram, eventually becoming a popular poet through her three collections of poetry.

In March 2015, Kaur posted a series of photographs to Instagram depicting herself with menstrual blood stains on her clothing and bedsheets. The photographs were taken as part of a visual rhetoric course at the University of Waterloo in Waterloo, Ontario, Canada. Instagram removed the images, in response to which Kaur wrote a viral critique of the company's actions. As a result of the incident, Kaur's poetry gained more traction and her initially self-published debut poetry collection, Milk and Honey (2014), was reprinted by Andrews McMeel Publishing to widespread commercial success. Considered to be at the forefront of the "Instapoetry" style, Kaur's work is simplistic in language and explores South Asian identity, immigration, and femininity. Her childhood and personal life serve as sources of inspiration. Line drawings accompany her poetry with stark subject matter.

After the success of Milk and Honey, Kaur describes struggling throughout the creation of her second collection, The Sun and Her Flowers (2017). Her third collection, Home Body (2020), is influenced by a desire to feel less pressure for commercial success and the COVID-19 pandemic.

Kaur has a large social media following, particularly on Instagram. Since its release in 2014, her collection Milk and Honey has sold over 11 million copies and has been translated into 43 languages. Kaur's poetry has had mixed critical reception, having been praised for her influence and derided for her verse. Kaur has been included on congratulatory year-end lists by the BBC and Elle; The New Republic controversially called her the "Writer of the Decade".

== Early life ==
Kaur was born into a Sikh family in Punjab, India, on 4 October 1992. At age three, she immigrated to Canada with her parents. Her father had left and was not present for Kaur's birth. Due to financial instability, he would send back supplies suitable for Kaur and her upbringing. She lived with her parents and three younger siblings in a one-bedroom basement flat, where they slept in the same bed. Her family eventually settled in Brampton, Ontario, alongside a large South Asian diaspora community, while Kaur's father worked as a truck driver.

When her father lived in Japan, he would write Punjabi poetry to Kaur's mother, who practiced painting. At the age of five, Kaur was compelled to take up her mother's hobby of painting; she was given a paintbrush and forced to draw. Her mother wanted to instill this art in her since it was so close to home. Kaur recalled that poetry was a recurrent aspect of her faith, spirituality and everyday life: "There were evenings when my dad would sit around for hours, analyzing a single verse." As a child, Kaur would find herself embarrassed by her mother's accent and try to distance herself. Kaur was generally self-conscious about her identity. Her mother was occasionally distant to Kaur, as a result of her family and culture, particularly when Kaur was on her period; menstruating, alongside her childhood abuse, often left Kaur debilitated. Her relationship with her parents, in particular her mother, became turbulent in her adolescence; there were extensive arguments over mundane activities that Kaur later interpreted as a result of wishing to preserve their original culture. As a young child she witnessed relatives and friends experience domestic violence or sexual abuse; watching her parents be subject to racism, she inferred, resulted in her coy disposition. Her environment growing up led to her developing what she deemed "constant survival mode".

She performed kirtan and Indian classical music for several years. Kaur aspired to be an astronaut or a social worker or a fashion designer; her ambitions changed frequently and her father prohibited her from studying the latter subject in university. She expressed an interest in reading from a young age, finding it relieved her loneliness. Her interest was hindered by having English as a second language, first learning it at age 10, although she considered her affinity for books as akin to a friendship. Her confidence and social skills grew in fourth grade.

An initial aversion to English meant Kaur was effectively mute for some time. Throughout middle school she partook in "speech competitions", winning one in seventh grade, thus helping her find progress and hope despite isolation and bullying. According to Kaur, she was an easy target for ridicule due to her outward appearance and vulnerability. Kaur was subject to various comments about her appearance from her parents and peers. She had begun to grow in confidence following sixth grade and it was writing and performing that led her to "[find] her voice". She experienced the low point of her education during high-school, as she sustained, what she considered, toxic care. Her feelings were relieved upon forgoing people who she described as "very dangerous for me". Poetry brought her comfort as she dealt with being self-conscious – of literature, she read, among others, Amrita Pritam, Maya Angelou, Roald Dahl, Dr. Seuss and J. K. Rowling.

== Education ==
Kaur attended Turner Fenton Secondary School in Brampton, Ontario, Canada, where she began to explore creative writing and poetry. After high school, she pursued a degree at the University of Waterloo, majoring in rhetoric and professional writing. She taught creative-writing classes for high school and college students. When studying poetry, she said that she would "agonize over each and every word."

== Career ==
=== Early work (2009–2013) ===
Kaur first began performing poetry in 2009. Although she found spoken-word poetry "really natural", describing her first show as "Like a damn hug", she'd fidget with the paper above her face, leaving before audiences clapped due to her anxiety. Her poetry at first received a lukewarm reception, having been told that she was too aggressive for certain venues or made some people uncomfortable. "So many people around me early on thought it was absolutely ridiculous". Kaur started writing in an attempt to articulate her personal trauma, having just left an abusive relationship – which influenced her decision to perform poetry: "I wanted to find a voice, because I had been voiceless for so long". At university, her writing became more reflective than before, having previously written about boys she liked and the political changes she wanted to see in the world – although she was, by her own admission, ignorant on the matter, her poems at first lambasted the Canadian government. Kaur would often be in conflict with her parents over her choice to pursue poetry.

Throughout high school, Kaur shared her writing anonymously. She took the stage surname of Kaur because "Kaur is the name of every Sikh woman – brought in to eradicate the caste system in India – and I thought, wouldn't it be empowering if a young Kaur saw her name in a book store?". (Note: Kaur has described the name Singh as "the overarching last name" for her family.) From 2013 onward, she began sharing her work without a pseudonym on Tumblr before moving to Instagram in 2014 where she started adding simple illustrations. Around this time, she began to garner a cult following and, at times, had 600 attendees at her shows, her career, thus far, having been subject to "[almost] word of mouth". Her first poem posted on Instagram regarded a wife coping with her husband's alcoholism; she described the experience as cathartic.

=== Milk and Honey (2014–2016) ===
At first submitted her poetry to literary anthologies, magazines and journals, to little success. Kaur's first book, Milk and Honey, was self-published on Createspace on 4 November 2014, after she began work at age 18. She created the poems in Milk and Honey "entirely for [herself], with zero concept of book in mind", and sold more than 10,000 copies. Kaur recalled that she was hesitant to submit to magazines or journals because it "felt like I was taking apart [Milk and Honey] and throwing things at different walls, hoping they would stick. I feel like it only made sense when it was [collected] because this is a body of work".

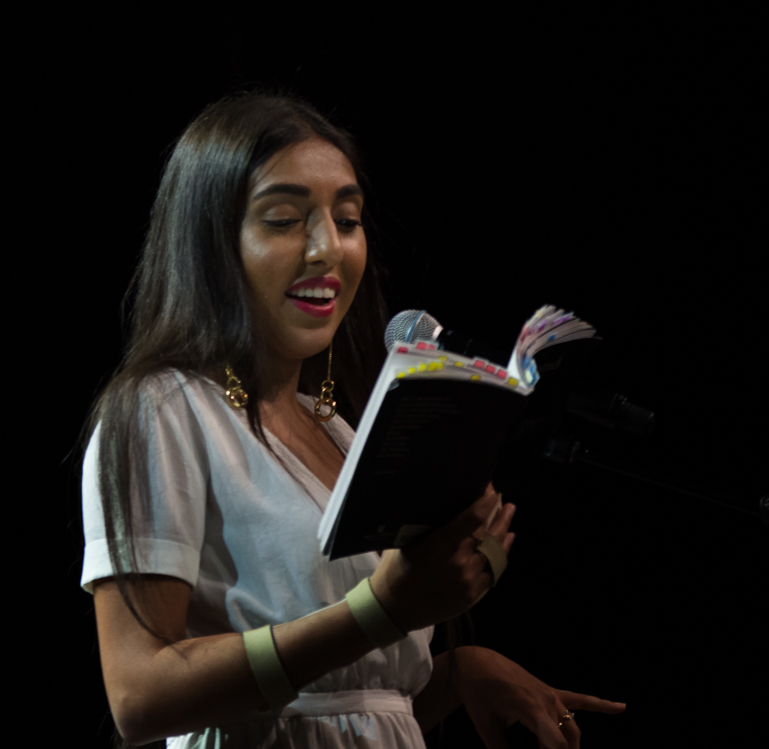
Kaur reading an excerpt from Milk and Honey

In March 2015, as a part of her university photography project, Kaur – intending to challenge prevalent societal menstrual taboos and the objectification of women – posted a series of photographs to Instagram depicting herself with menstrual blood stains on her clothing and bed sheets. Internet trolls harassed Kaur over the photos, which were twice removed for not complying with the site's terms of service; Kaur claimed that she was not notified beforehand or given a reason and criticised their censorship as misogynistic and reaffirming what she sought to condemn – deeming the act an "attack on my humanity". Instagram apologized and brought back the images, citing a mistaken removal.

Her response went viral, credited with bringing Kaur more followers and leading to the subsequent rise in popularity of her poetry. She later regretted writing her response, finding widespread disdain affected her mental health, experiencing anxiety that "sort of set in and never really left" and suicidal thoughts for a period of time. That same year, she wrote 10 chapters of a yet unpublished novel.

As Kaur rose to prominence on social media, Milk and Honey was re-released by Andrews McMeel Publishing, which saw her work alongside an editor for the first time. It became a "blockbuster" success and, as of 2017, has sold 2.5 million copies worldwide and translated into 25 languages – the same year, it was the best-selling book in Canada. During a poetry reading in 2015, Kaur, upon seeing a line of her fans that extended four street blocks, fully realised the extent of her audience and grew more confident in her poetry as a result. She performed a TED Talk the next year. Kirsty Melville, publisher and president of AMP, credits the book's success to Kaur's connection to her readers.

At age 22, she employed seven people to aid her, as a part of a company she founded. While writing, her team often manages her social media. She would later describe the success of Milk and Honey as surreal, noting a deeply sentimental and inspiring attachment.

In August 2024, it was one of 13 books banned statewide by Utah's state board of education, on the grounds of its "objective sensitive material."

=== The Sun and Her Flowers (2017–2019) ===
they convinced me
i only had a few good years left
before i was replaced by a girl younger than me
as though men yield power with age
but women grow into irrelevance
they can keep their lies
for i have just gotten started
i feel as though i just left the womb
my twenties are the warm-up
for what i'm really about to do
wait till you see me in my thirties
now that will be a proper introduction
to the nasty, wild, woman in me,
how can i leave before the party's started
rehearsals begin at forty
i ripen with age
i do not come with an expiration date
and now
for the main event
curtains up at fifty
let's begin the show

— Timeless

Following a three-month writing trip in California, and in the same year as her induction into the Brampton Arts Walk of Fame, Kaur's second book, The Sun and Her Flowers, was published on 3 October 2017. She views it as a "one long continuous poem that goes on for 250 pages", "which while birthed in Instagram, is a concept that depends on being bound". As of 2020, the book has sold upwards of a million copies and has been translated into multiple languages. In 2018, she made nearly $1.4 million from poetry sales. That same year, she performed at the Jaipur Literary Festival: "It was as if I had waited my whole life for this moment. It was my only show, where I wasn't nervous. The crowd was energetic."

While touring the world, she experienced feelings of depression and anxiety. The process of creating The Sun and Her Flowers and trying to replicate her success affected her mental health, reporting "furious 12-hour [writing] stretches" and 72-hour migraines. She experienced months of writer's block and frustration at her work, ultimately calling its creation the "greatest challenge of my life". Following its release, she dealt with feelings of burnout – writing the poem "Timeless" in response. These feelings began to subside as she viewed them as transient – aided by Elizabeth Gilbert's Big Magic, which she said "saved my life". By early 2019, she entered therapy to ease her depression and anxiety.

That year, she was commissioned by Penguin Classics to write an introduction for a new edition of Kahlil Gibran's The Prophet, in anticipation of that book entering the public domain in the United States and performed at the London Book Fair. Kaur considers Gibran an influence and has dubbed The Prophet her "life bible".

=== Home Body and Healing Through Words (2020–present) ===
Kaur released her third poetry collection, Home Body, on 17 November 2020. The collection features illustrations from Kaur and became one of the best-selling books of 2020. Kaur stated that she sought to feel less pressure for commercial profit while writing the collection. She reached out to fellow authors for guidance because she had imposter syndrome due to Milk and Honey's success. She began work on the collection in 2018, during a time of depression, and concluded the process amidst a period of introspection, a by-product of the COVID-19 pandemic.

During the COVID-19 pandemic, Kaur moved back in to her parents' house in Brampton and began teaching workshops on Instagram Live, due to feelings of loneliness and fear and a desire to connect with her audience. To her students, she emphasizes a natural and therapeutic approach to writing.

Kaur self-released a poetry special, Rupi Kaur Live, consisting of poetry readings and anecdotes accompanied by visuals and music, in April 2021, after it was turned down by streaming services – Kaur acknowledged that it was an atypical prospect. By August that year it had been released on Amazon Prime in a limited capacity. Explaining the impetus, Kaur recalled her separation of performance and prose, attempting to hide the former, and how her eventual marriage of the two styles "in maybe 2016" allowed the show to occur. In 2021, she performed as a part of a tribute to Jack Layton.

In 2022, she released her fourth book, Healing Through Words. The idea for the book was conceived at Instagram Live writing workshops that she held during the COVID-19 pandemic, and she realized that many of her readers "used writing as a form of self-care." An interactive book with free writing exercises dedicated to her readers, the book also shares "what my writing process is, how I overcome writer's block, my tips, my tricks."

== Artistry and influences ==
Since Gurmukhi script has no concept of separate lower and upper case, her work is written exclusively in lowercase, using only the period as a form of punctuation; Kaur writes this way to honour the Punjabi language, her first language that she can speak and read, but limited to write in. She said that she enjoys the equality of letters and that the style reflects her worldview. The experience of learning English upon moving to Canada and studying poetry has influenced her writing style, subsequently tailoring her work to be accessible, particularly by readers learning English. Kaur has emphasized her poetry's relation to South Asian culture, to the point that she's wary of Western readers fully understanding it.

Her poems often conclude with either a final italicized line that either identify its audience or articulate its theme or her name. In her article for The Globe and Mail, Tajja Isen described this as Kaur's "trademark move" and likened it to the use of a hashtag. Kaur's style ranges from aphoristic, inspirational and confessional, although her poems aren't "100 percent autobiographical" – the fictional elements being often opaque in regards to their authenticity. Kaur's childhood: her fickle temperament, her Sikh identity and her dad's activism – which included Kaur partaking in protests as a child – affected her poems.

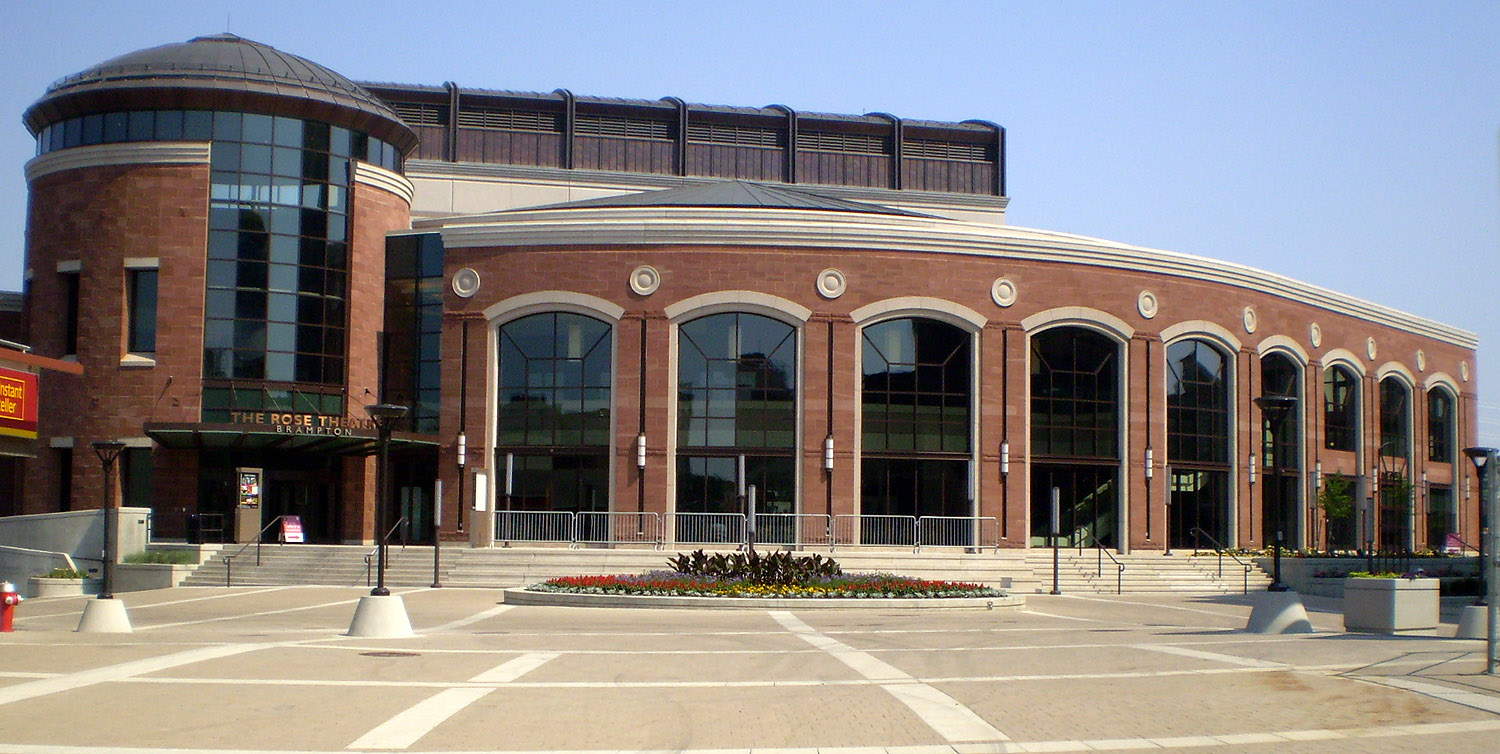
The Rose Theatre, where Kaur regularly performs her poetry

The writing process begins with her starting on paper and then transferring the "most promising" material to an extended Microsoft Word document. Oftentimes after this process culminates, she attaches a compelling image along with her poems to complement the verses. Lastly, it concludes after she has narrowed the poem to its main elements and she has received affirmation from her sister. Her printed poems are often excerpts from longer spoken-word work, publishing "the part that really made my stomach turn". Due to treating writing as a "form of healing", she doesn't consider the audience, solely valuing her response and engagement. Across all her projects, she maintains "full creative control", contributing towards aspects such as the cover and minutiae of her books. Kaur has said that she approaches her poetry like running a business and writes "to perform it", seeing the stage as where her ambitions are fully achieved. Within the context of performance, her use of line breaks and periods represent where she would pause and where a new idea would be introduced, respectively.

Her written poetry focuses on design, whereas her performances centre on rhyme, embodiment, narrative and delivery. She performs in a theatrical manner, at times alongside audience members, and makes use of original music scores and ornate projections. She often uses humour in her performances as a rhetorical device to tell personal stories of trauma and challenge social inequalities. Carol Muske-Dukes highlighted that, in being a "performative poet", Kaur continues a tradition of "the page enact[ing] [the performance] in the mind". Elisa New spotlighted Kaur's proximity and similarities with spoken-word and hip-hop artists.

An example of Kaur's imagery which uses the central conceit of self-harm

Sparse line drawings accompany her poems. They have been compared to outsider art; her drawings and poetry have seen allusions to childhood artistry. The National Poetry Library noted that the art in Milk and Honey, functions like a graphic novel. The style of drawing continues in The Sun and Her Flowers. Her illustrations, juxtaposed with the poems, are "striking" and "often disturbing", with one, for example, linking self-harm with despair. Images that appear in her work include twisting bodies, crawling flowers, and fingers forming the shapes of hearts. Kaur explained that her style is intended to be recognisable and evoke a brand, akin to Apple's. She creates them following their respective poem being written. Since its inception, Kaur's public image has been denoted as authentic and individual, spiritual and boldly feminist.

Alongside her peers – Nayyirah Waheed, Lang Leav, Warsan Shire – and other "Instapoets", Kaur's plainspoken and free verse poetry is delivered in a "bite-size" manner – some poems only composed of one line. With The Sun and Her Flowers, her poems expanded their length. "[W]ith its epigrammatic brevity, plain language, and empowering messages", Kaur's poetry has been said to be emblematic of the common "Instapoet" style. Kaur, who dislikes the term "Instapoet", has also been said to belong to a "new generation of migrant writers, a generation who 'sits-in, tweets, posts and broadcasts'". She has been said to be possibly the "representative of an entire generation's values and ethos". She differs from her peers in her focus upon self-care and depiction of pain as intertwined with triumph. Kaur has said that she writes for "the generation that's reading my work...I am writing something that is believable to that generation".

Tina Daheley and The New York Times' Gregory Cowles recognized a candid and lyrical nature in Kaur's poetry with Cowles saying that her "artless vulnerability [is] like a cross between Charles Bukowski and Cat Power". Due to her usage of dry, open-ended, and colloquial language, Kaur has been said to break from and reject traditional standards and features of poetry which are held in importance. Matthew Zapruder, Becky Robertson of Quill & Quire and Kaur identified a universal quality in her work. Literature scholar Alyson Miller wrote that Kaur makes use of "gendered yet ostensibly universal themes relating to sexism, trauma, friendship, and violence".

Following Milk and Honey, she became more selective in regards to publishing her poetry online, having extensively showcased her work online unless embarrassed by the content. "Over the years, I've distanced myself from it...When the numbers started to grow, I started to overthink things. I felt more pressure to be correct and perfect all the time". Focusing upon "design, marketing, creative writing and branding", Kaur's Instagram account, with 4.5 million followers, fluctuates between photographs of Kaur and her poetry, with South Asian people and iconography as a prominent focus. Using The Sun and Her Flowers as a base, her poetry special had an "ethereal nature-driven aesthetic", featuring large yellow flower petals around the stage and projected. She refined her aesthetic into a more stylised manner following the release of Beyoncé (2013). Kaur has described Beyoncé as an influence, as well as Sharon Olds, Marina Abramović, Adele, Kahlil Gibran, Nizzar Qabbani, Amrita Sher-Gil and Frida Kahlo. Furthermore, Kaur takes inspiration from herself, her friends and her mother.

=== Themes and motifs ===
our work should equip
the next generation of women
to outdo us in every field
this is the legacy we'll leave.

— Progress, an example of Kaur's feminist writing.

Kaur' poetry explores a small selection of themes alongside issues faced by Indian women and immigrants, female trauma and the "South Asian experience". Her mother is a subject she treats with reverence in her work and pays tribute to her parents in her poem Broken English – Kaur credits her mother, due to significant sacrifices made in Kaur's childhood, with her career as a poet. Eleanor Ty wrote that Kaur, through her poetry, "reveals a sophisticated understanding of the psychological complexities of family dynamics". Although examined differently, her written and performed poetry share the same themes.

Domestic and sexual violence were a particular focus of her initial work and rape related trauma became more explicit after Milk and Honey. She explored violence and trauma heavily in her early work because "I had this desire to unpack so many deeper emotions and issues that I'd seen affecting me and so many women around me". Her poem, I'm Taking My Body Back, concerns her surviving a sexual assault. Kaur has admitted that writing about these heavy subjects can be both cathartic and troublesome to her mental wellbeing. She writes in the second person in her most solemn depictions of domestic abuse, "as if [she] is attempting to distance herself from her experience of physical abuse".

Common cultural metaphors and motifs such as honey, fruit and water arise in her work. Many of her poems concern "women as a collective". A sense of mystic transcendentalism can be found, often intertwined with discourse on 'natural' beauty. Milk and Honey has themes of abuse, love, loss and healing. Love serves as her general primary theme. Feminism, refugees, immigration and her South Asian identity became more prominent in The Sun and Her Flowers, alongside musings on body dysmorphia, abuse, rape and self-love. Kaur said of the books that they are "inward" and "outward" journeys, respectively; The Sun and Her Flowers has more breadth of themes. Influenced by the COVID-19 pandemic, Home Body examines themes of capitalism, productivity and mental health, more than before.

== Reception and impact ==
fall in love with your solitude

— Kaur's most popular poem, from Milk and Honey. (Note: Kaur's most popular poems are "usually the unambiguous affirmations".)

The most popular of the "Instapoets", and dubbed the "Oprah of her generation," Chiara Giovanni of Buzzfeed News noted that Kaur's celebrity – which has led her peer Kazim Ali to call her perhaps the most famous poet of all time – is "more akin to that of a pop star like [Ariana] Grande than a traditional poet", crediting the accessibility of her poetry for her fame. Agatha French, writing for the Los Angeles Times, compared reactions to the announcement of The Sun and Her Flowers, by Kaur's majority young and female fans, to "the fervent devotion of Beatles fans" – she's been credited with "spearhead[ing] the merging of poetry and pop culture". Her live performances routinely have hundreds of attendees, with turnout, at times, as high as 800 people.

According to Kaur, her success has "democratised poetry and literature in general" – Kaur also credits Instagram with the perceived democratisation of poetry, feeling that her working class and racial background wouldn't allow her to be published otherwise. Regarded as a "pioneer" of the "Instapoet" style, Erica Wagner noted Kaur's influence in what she called the "biggest overall shift [in reading habits] we've seen in the past decade". Kaur has instigated greater focus on poetry by booksellers, American adults and young people. In 2017, a rise of poetry sales in Canada and in the United Kingdom prompted attribution to Kaur.

Fans have praised her for writing about her personal trauma and elevating diversity in a "overwhelmingly" white literary scene. Her poetry has been credited with "inspir[ing] [a] hub of creativity for young black girls"; author Tanya Byrne argued that fellow BAME writers should replicate Kaur's self-publishing. Her style of menstrual activism has become "more the norm than the exception", with many women of color generating similar media attention since Kaur. She has inspired various young poets to begin the practice. "Kaur has become...a voice for the marginalized", wrote Sadaf Ahsan, for National Post; literature scholar Lili Pâquet saw such a signifier as resulting from the fallout of her menstrual photographs. Scholars have characterized her as a "decolonial feminist poet".

=== Online reception ===
Her series of menstrual photographs elicited a very mixed reception. She received death threats, which led to emotional numbness and a subsequent distancing from social media. In retrospect, Amika George, a British activist who campaigns against period poverty in the United Kingdom, credits Kaur's menstrual photographs with being the "catalyst for opening up the conversation about periods". Allison Jackson of The World, Jane Helpern of i-D and, literary scholar Anna Camilleri espoused similar notions in 2015. Various feminist artists defended Kaur when her menstrual photographs were taken down. Kaur noted an effect on her friends in Punjab, as they had frank discussions with their families regarding periods. In response to the reception of her photos, Kaur initially said:

I know that 50-60% of all comments on every site that covered the story were negative, but that didn't affect me much. What upset me was that people I knew first-hand were reacting badly. These were guys from my own community, who I'd been to high school with, and they were trying to tarnish me rather than the art...People always say my work is so great for women, that it is feminist art. But for me, it's men that need to see it the most. Because it's the misogyny that we need to address, rather than the feminism.

Kaur later admitted that for many years internet trolls had "left me broken", having previously dismissed such ideas. To resolve her dismay, she came to the conclusion that "I'm here to speak my truth and connect with readers, and that's it. None of the negative voices matter in the end". Her work have been the subject of memes online, usually in the form of parody poems mocking Kaur's writing style, their prominence having been compared to a cottage industry. Ahsan described Kaur as a "social media commodity", a status from which she prospers. In 2017, a book parodying Kaur's poetry, entitled Milk and Vine, was released. Kaur considers disdain for the fame her work has garnered to be analogous to the reception of contemporary art, seeing both as disparaged for being "easy".

Waheed and Shire, among Kaur's influences, have accused her of plagiarism. Claims by Waheed's supporters are based on Kaur and her lack of punctuation and use of honey as a metaphor. Kaur has denied claims of plagiarism, speculating about the likelihood of similar experiences and that their similar themes and use of honey is a "by-product of our times", comparing contemporary concurrent artistic development to that in the Renaissance or Victorian periods – Kaur attributing their namesakes as said development.

=== Critical reception ===
Critics have been less laudatory than general audiences. Kaur has become "something of a polarizing figure in the literary, publishing, and media communities", whose "work is often knocked as being lowbrow or trite, or not in the rich tradition of serious poetry". Her use of contemporary vernacular has drawn ire. Other criticisms include her work being formulaic, juvenile and attenuated. Kaur feels that her work can't be "fully reviewed or critiqued through a white lens or a Western one". Kazim Ali commented that "no criticism has been leveled at Kaur that hasn't been similarly leveled at "actual" poets", citing Mary Oliver, Jane Hirshfield, Sharon Olds and Lucille Clifton.

Rebecca Watts lambasted her poems as "artless" and characterised by "the open denigration of intellectual engagement and rejection of craft" in favour of popularity and accessibility. Priya Khaira-Hanks, writing for The Guardian, remarked that Kaur's accessibility often led to "over-simplicity". Watts' criticism was both supported and attacked by other poets. Tajja Isen disparaged what she regarded as an overly explanatory style, particularly when performed, arguing that Kaur's "belated imposition of rhythm" fails to conceal compositional shortcomings. Carl Wilson and Khaira-Hanks argued that her mainstream success and personal identity contributed towards people disregarding her work. Kaur's poetry and her status as a poet has been dismissed and seen to be of inauthentic quality.

Watts considered Kaur to be more concerned with authenticity than the "traditional craft of poetry". In an essay for The Baffler, Soraya Roberts chastised Kaur as disingenuously representative of female South Asian oppression, when she is purportedly chiefly concerned with commodification; Pâquet echoed similar sentiments. Kaur's lack of distinction between her personal experiences and collective experiences of trauma has received further criticism. Alyson Miller viewed Kaur's work as vague and clichéd, citing an example depicting oppression: kaur, a woman of sikhi.

In 2017, BBC and Vogue listed Kaur in their lists of women of the year; Quill & Quire chose The Sun and Her Flowers for their annual list of the best books. The next year she was included on Forbes and Elle's complimentary lists of emerging artists. In 2019, The New Republic named Kaur "Writer of the Decade", due to her impact on the medium of poetry; this led to a debate on whether the award was deserved, as well as about her work in general.

== Politics ==
During the 2020–2021 Indian farmers' protest, Kaur supported Punjabi farmers in their plight, citing that for "Sikhs, dissent against oppression is nothing new". November 2023, Kaur declined an invitation to attend a Diwali celebration hosted by US Vice President Kamala Harris in the White House, citing the Biden administration's continued support of Israel and its bombardment of Gaza, which she called "the collective punishment of a trapped civilian population".

== Works ==
=== Books ===
- Milk and Honey. Andrews McMeel Publishing. 4 November 2014. ISBN 9781449496364.
- The Sun and Her Flowers. Andrews McMeel Publishing. 3 October 2017. ISBN 9781449486792.
- Home Body. Andrews McMeel Publishing. 17 November 2020. ISBN 9781471196737.
- Healing Through Words. Simon & Schuster. 27 September 2022. ISBN 978-1-6680-0868-3.
- Love Poems. Andrews McMeel Publishing. 13 January 2026. ISBN 979-8881606343.

=== Articles ===
- "History shows Punjab has always taken on tyrants. Modi is no different". The Washington Post. 16 December 2020. Archived from the original on 3 April 2021.

=== Performance films ===
- Rupi Kaur Live (2021)

=== Short films ===
- Rise (2023)

== See also ==
- Instapoetry
- List of Canadian poets
- List of University of Waterloo people
