= Atticus (poet) =

Anonymous poet

- Writing career
- Pen name: Atticus
- Website: www.atticuspoetry.com

Atticus is the pseudonym of an anonymous Canadian poet. He is the author of five books, including The Dark Between Stars and The Truth About Magic, both of which are New York Times Best Sellers.

Atticus writes poetry, epigrams, and aphorisms incorporating themes of love, relationships, and adventure. Atticus made the decision to remain anonymous after losing a famous friend to addiction in 2017. In 2018, another poet, Collin Yost, revealed his identity as former MTV star Duncan Penn.

== Career ==
Atticus began writing poetry in 2013 after being inspired by a friendship with the American actor Michael Madsen. He wrote his first poem in Paris in 2013. Atticus chooses to remain anonymous as a symbol of spreading art with fame after losing a celebrity friend to addiction. Atticus has been a long supporter of the nonprofit To Write Love On Her Arms, which supports mental health services and awareness for youth.

In 2022, Atticus launched Lost Poet Wine with the American spirit company AMASS. A wine brand designed to “bring poetry and wine together”.

== Publications ==
The Dark Between Stars is a New York Times bestseller. It has been translated into fourteen languages. It was nominated for Goodreads Book of the Year in 2018.

The Truth About Magic was released on September 10, 2019, and became a New York Times bestseller. It was nominated for Goodreads Book of the Year in 2019.

Love Her Wild is his debut book. It was a nationally and internationally bestselling book. It has been translated into 14 languages, including German, Spanish, French, Italian, and Portuguese, and was nominated for Goodreads Book of the Year.

LVOE: Poems, Epigrams & Aphorisms was released on November 1, 2022. It was an Instant International and National Bestseller.

SPARK: The One Sentence Journal is a short-form journal released by Atticus to promote joy and positive mental health.

The Best of Atticus Collection: In Nov 2023, Atticus released a “Best Of” collection of favorite poems.

LVOE Vol II: Poems, Epigrams & Aphorisms was released on Feb 15th, 2024. It was an Instant International and National Bestseller.

== Reception ==
In 2016, Atticus was named the #1 Poet To Follow by Teen Vogue magazine. In 2022, The Times called Atticus “Byron for the Instagram generation” and the same year, he was named "The World's Most Tattooable Poet" by Galore Magazine.
