= Upile Chisala =

Malawian poet and scientist

- Born: 1994 (age 31–32); Malawi
- Education: University of Oxford; New Mexico State University
- Occupation: Poet
- Writing career
- Notable works: soft magic, nectar, a fire like you
- Movement: instapoetry

Upile Chisala (born 1994) is a poet from Malawi. She prefers the term "storyteller." She is considered an Instapoet. She is often considered to belong to Malawi's third generation of writers. She has won numerous awards, including Forbes Africa's 30 Under 30.

== Life ==
Chisala was born in south-east Malawi in 1994, and grew up in Zomba. She began writing poetry at thirteen.

At seventeen, Chisala moved to the United States, where she majored in sociology with minors in Women's Studies and Law & Society at New Mexico State University. She began writing poetry at college to process experiences with racism. She graduated in 2015, but struggled finding a steady job. Chisala continued to write poetry, and self-published her first book of poems, Soft Magic, which includes poems she wrote during college. These poems reflected on her feeling like "an oddity."

Chisala then attended the University of Oxford, where she enrolled for a Master's of Science in African studies. She later moved to Johannesburg, South Africa.

In 2017, Chisala published her second collection, Nectar, exploring her experience with depression and complicated relationship with her parents. Following the book's success, Chisala signed a book deal with Andrews McMeel Publishing. Andrews McMeel republished her first two books. Her third collection is titled A Fire Like You.

Chisala founded a mentorship program for writers in Johannesburg, Khala Series.

== Awards ==
- 2019: Forbes Africa 30 Under 30
- 2018: OkayAfrica 100 Women

== Bibliography ==
- soft magic (2015)
- nectar (2017)
- a fire like you (2020)
- Woven with Brown Thread (2021)
