= Being a Man Festival =

- Venue: South Bank Centre, London
- Founded: 1 February 2014
- Founder: Jude Kelly
- Major events: Addresses the challenges and pressures of masculine identity in the 21st century.

Being a Man Festival (BAM) is a UK-based festival which addresses the challenges and pressures of masculine identity in the 21st century. The festival was founded in 2014 by Jude Kelly.

== BAM 2014 ==
Speakers at the inaugural festival included: Grayson Perry (artist), Ziauddin Yousafzai (father of the Nobel laureate Malala Yousafzai), Michael Kaufman (co-founder of the White Ribbon Campaign) Jon Snow (journalist), Billy Bragg (singer), Nick Hornby (writer and lyricist), Charlie Condou (actor) and Hardeep Singh Kohli (broadcaster and writer).

== BAM 2015 ==
Speakers at the second festival included: Sheldon Thomas (imam and former extremist), Gemma Cairney (BBC Radio 1 presenter and documentary filmmaker), Akala (rapper) and Frankie Boyle (comedian).

== BAM 2016 ==
Speakers at the 2016 festival included: Professor Green (rapper) and Sir Roger Moore.

== BAM 2017 ==
Speakers included: Simon Amstell (comedian), Robert Webb (comedian), Kevin Powell (American political activist), Alan Hollinghurst (writer and winner of the 2004 Booker Prize) and Antonythasan Jesuthasan (author and actor).

== See also ==
- Women of the World Festival
