= Instapoetry =

Style of poetry

Instapoetry is a style of poetry that emerged after the advent of social media, especially on Instagram. The term has been used to describe poems written specifically for being shared online, most commonly on Instagram, but also other platforms including Twitter, Tumblr, and TikTok.

The style usually consists of short, direct lines in aesthetically pleasing fonts that are sometimes accompanied by an image or drawing, often without rhyme schemes or meter, and dealing with commonplace themes. Literary critics, poets, and writers have contended with Instapoetry's focus on brevity and plainness compared to traditional poetry, criticizing it for reproducing rather than subverting normative ideas on social media platforms that favor popularity and accessibility over craft and depth.

== History ==
Instapoetry developed as a result of young, predominantly women, amateur poets sharing their output to expand their readership, who began using social media as their preferred method of distribution rather than traditional publishing methods. The term "Instapoetry" is a portmanteau of the words "Instagram" and "poetry," and was created by other writers trying to define and understand the new extension of "instant poetry" shared via social media, most prominently Instagram.

In its most basic form, Instapoetry usually consists of bite-sized verses that consider political and social subjects such as immigration, domestic violence, sexual assault, love, culture, feminism, gun violence, war, racism, LGBTQ rights, and other social justice topics. All of these elements are usually made to fit social media feeds that are easily accessible through applications on smartphones.

== Scholarship ==
Despite the diversity of poetry on Instagram, the Brazilian linguist Bruna Osaki Fazano found that shared "aspects of the compositional form, theme and style" mean that it can be understood as a specific genre. Camilla Holm Soelseth argues that taking on the platform-specific tasks of a social media creator is a prerequisite for being an Instapoet. Writing in Poetics Today, JuEunhae Knox combined quantitative and qualitative analysis to show that Instapoetry is a cohesive genre, in part because "the sheer volume and rapidity of content production in turn encourages posts that are not only visually appealing but also immediately recognizable as Instapoems".

Instapoetry has been seen as a practice that serves as a form of self-staging for poets and "[crafts] authenticity". Eirik Vassenden describes the work of Norwegian poet Trygve Skaug as appearing to offer a "simple, almost direct access to the inner self". Vassenden writes that poems such as Rupi Kaur's "if you are not enough for yourself / you will never be enough / for someone else" are "authentic" to such an extent that they are not literary. Kiera Obbard describes how Rupi Kaur uses humour as a rhetorical device in her poetry performances to tell personal stories of trauma and challenge social inequalities.

Scholars have also studied the work of specific Instapoets, such as Rupi Kaur, R.M. Drake, Aja Monet, Yrsa Daley-Ward, Nayyirah Waheed, Atticus, Nikita Gill and Trygve Skaug.

== Overview ==
Academics have shown appreciation for the way in which Instapoetry has stimulated interest in poetry in general. Meanwhile, it has been argued that since Instapoets avoid critical evaluations, academics, and the publishing industry, Instapoets qualify more as online celebrities than literary figures. Additionally, although Instapoetry has been characterized as anti-establishment, Alyson Miller noted traditional or even conservative views in the online posts of Instapoets in contrast with the activist views the style is associated with, and that there is a contradiction between "the extra-textual commentary surrounding Instapoetry, particularly by way of interviews and artistic statements, and the content of works which repeatedly reinscribe conservative, patriarchal, and heteronormative worldviews". Thom Young, a poet and high school English teacher, created a parody Instagram page as a way to mock Instapoets and their work, describing it as "fidget-spinner poetry. Like they're just scrolling on their devices, to read something instantly, while the libraries are empty. I think people today don't want to read anything that causes a whole lot of critical thinking." According to Johnathan Ford's piece in the Financial Times, as Instagram's algorithms have limited prospective Instapoets' reach-per-post, it has pushed them to pay to promote their material. Popular Instagram accounts will be promoted to the front of users' feeds, with the app's algorithm, in the view of critics, favoring the spread of bland, inauthentic, or clichéd content while preventing disciplined poetry from reaching new audiences.

== Writers described as Instapoets ==
- Rupi Kaur
- Atticus
- Amanda Lovelace
- Tyler Knott Gregson
- Najwa Zebian
- Lang Leav
- Nikita Gill
- Upile Chisala
- Tendai M. Shaba
- Donna Ashworth
- Trista Mateer

== See also ==
- Hashtag activism
- Virtue signalling
