= Najwa Zebian =

Lebanese-Canadian author

- Born: 26 April 1990 (age 36); Bekaa, Lebanon
- Citizenship: Canadian; Lebanese
- Occupations: Activist; Author; Speaker; Educator
- Notable work: Mind Platter (2016); The Nectar of Pain (2016); Sparks of Phoenix (2019); The Book of Healing (2021); Welcome Home (2021); Conversations on Letting Go (2022); The Only Constant(2024); The One Who Broke You Can't Heal You(2026)
- Website: www.najwazebian.com

Najwa Zebian (born April 26, 1990) is a Lebanese-Canadian activist, author, poet, and speaker.

== Early life and education ==
Zebian was born in Bekaa, Lebanon and moved to Ontario, Canada at sixteen during the 2006 Lebanon War. She attended the University of Western Ontario, earning a Bachelor of Science in Biology in 2010 and a Master of Education in Curriculum Studies in 2013. She continued her studies and earned a Doctor of Education in Educational Leadership in 2022. She resides in London, Ontario.

== Career ==
Zebian self-published her first book, Mind Platter, in January 2016. She described it as a "compilation of reflections on life, as seen through the eyes of an educator, student, and human who experienced her early days in silence." In its first month, Mind Platter earned $2,300, which Zebian donated to the Syrian Refugee Fund in London. She also allocated a portion of her profits to finance summer activities for city high school students. In March 2018, a revised and expanded version of Mind Platter was published by Andrews McMeel Publishing.

Her second book, The Nectar of Pain, combined poetry and prose about the feelings elicited by romantic break-ups, was self-published in October 2016. A revised and expanded edition was released in March 2018 by Andrews McMeel Publishing.

In 2017, Zebian participated in the #MeToo movement when she spoke about being a victim of sexual harassment by an authority figure with whom she worked as a teacher. She wrote of her abuse: "I was blamed for it. I was told not to talk about it. I was told that it wasn’t that bad. I was told to get over it." An excerpt of her comments was referenced by the New York Times, and one of her poems was featured in news stories about the #MeToo movement.

In March 2019, Zebian's third book, Sparks of Phoenix, was published by Andrews McMeel Publishing. The collection talks about healing from abuse.

In 2022, former high school principal Michael Deeb pursued a $500,000 defamation lawsuit against Zebian regarding her 2017 #MeToo Facebook post that accused Deeb of "power abuse, gendered violence and financial abuse." During the hearing where Zebian sought to have the lawsuit dismissed, Superior Court Justice Spencer Nicholson stated:

"The difficulty in this case is that Ms. Zebian employs labels to describe Mr. Deeb’s conduct that a reasonable person, of any culture, religion or race, might conclude do not apply to his behaviour. Some of the descriptions used could be considered to be exaggerated. Some of her post appears to be inaccurate factually. For example, Ms. Zebian paints a picture of Mr. Deeb pursuing her, when there is some basis in the evidence before this court to conclude that she was the aggressor, at least later in the relationship."

== Published works ==
- Zebian, Najwa (2018). Mind platter. Kansas City, Missouri: Andrews McMeel Publishing. ISBN 9781449495510.
- Zebian, Najwa (2018). The Nectar of Pain. Kansas City, Missouri: Andrews McMeel Publishing. ISBN 9781449499884.
- Zebian, Najwa (2019). Sparks of Phoenix. Kansas City, Missouri: Andrews McMeel Publishing. ISBN 9781449496203.
- Zebian, Najwa (2021). Welcome Home: A Guide to Building a Home for Your Soul. New York: Harmony Books. ISBN 9780593231760.
- Zebian, Najwa (2022). The Book of Healing. Andrews McMeel Publishing. ISBN 9781524867355.
- Trust Your Heart. Scribd Original. 2023.
- Zebian, Najwa (2024). The Only Constant. New York: Harmony Books. ISBN 9780593580578.

== See also ==
- Instapoetry
