= The Sun and Her Flowers =

2017 book by Rupi Kaur

- Author: Rupi Kaur
- Language: English
- Genre: Romance
- Publisher: Andrews McMeel Publishing (US); Simon & Schuster (UK)
- Publication date: October 3, 2017
- Publication place: United States
- Pages: 256 pp (hardcover)
- ISBN: 9781449486792
- Preceded by: Milk and Honey

The Sun and Her Flowers (stylized in all lowercase) is Rupi Kaur's second collection of poetry, published in 2017. It is composed of five chapters, with illustrations by the author.

== Main title ==
"Titles always just come. It's not even something I've ever had to think about," states Kaur. The author decided to title the book this way just because she felt in love with the way that sunflowers worship with the sun, how they rise with the sun and then they follow the sun around. Kaur explains that was such a beautiful representation of love and relationships: the sun could represent a woman and the flowers could be the relationships that she has through life.

== Structure ==
The book is divided into 5 sections reflecting the life cycle of a flower, with chapters titled: Wilting, Falling, Rooting, Rising, and Blooming. It focuses on themes of love and loss, trauma and abuse, healing, femininity and the body. Wilting touches on the subject of heartbreak and loss. Falling focuses on depressive feelings following the loss of an important relationship. Rooting explores topics of female infanticide, immigration and borders. Blooming addresses the joy Kaur finally found coming to love and accept her roots, herself, and the world around her. She also comes to realize her mission in this world: equality and love for all genders, races and backgrounds.

== Author's inspiration ==
At first, the book was supposed to look a lot different: it was going to be a true chapter book in which the first chapter would have been the darkness and it would have taken the readers through the experience of an unhealthy love taking into account what that makes a person feel and how that defines a person’s lens. The second chapter would have been the light and it would have been about a healthy relationship and what was it like. However, Kaur was not really inspired about it because she was writing about death and immigration whereas she wanted to talk about love. Finally Kaur decided to write whatever feeling that was coming to her mind.

== Publication and reception ==
After self-publishing her first poetry collection, Milk and Honey, Kaur signed a two-book deal with Simon and Schuster. Due to Milk and Honey selling two million copies and being on The New York Times Best Sellers list for over a year, Kaur found it extremely difficult to start creating her second collection of poetry. She attempted to begin the new book's journey for months, but nothing she wrote satisfied her expectations. Kaur's goal throughout The Sun and Her Flowers ended up focusing on "the corrective experience" that occurs in unhealthy relationships. She expressed her love for the poems about death, mainly because death has been something she's been contemplating for quite a while. Discussing her first book Milk and Honey—a collection of poems that tackles tough themes such as rape, violence, alcoholism, trauma—Kaur described The Sun and Her Flowers as a grown-up version, that would be deeper and more emotional. The novel mainly sold with the YA age group whereas many of the poems are written about topics such as heartbreak and rebuilding yourself after. By January 2018, the book had sold a million copies.

=== Publication ===
The Sun and Her Flowers was published on October 3, 2017. A week after the book was released, it ranked second on Amazon's best-seller list. Within the first two weeks of publication, it was featured in the top ten of the New York Times Best Sellers list. As of January 5, 2020, it has been listed on the New York Times list for 76 weeks.

The Guardian review quoted poems from Kaur's collection and explained how simplistic the language often is. It said, "Even if you like her, these little jabs at her plaintive voice are spot on: one of Kaur's actual poems muses "If you are not enough for yourself/you will never be enough / for someone else" and, while that gained 175,000 likes on Instagram, it has the air of the slurred advice you might overhear at the back of a Wetherspoons." However it defended Kaur's concise, and somewhat condensed, poetry by saying, "But to read Kaur's success as an omen of the death of poetry would be to unfairly dismiss writing that contains bravery, beauty, and wisdom. Frankly, the literary world is saturated with white male voices of dubious quality. Kaur's poetry should be given the same freedom to be flawed."

The Sunday Times review described the book as "alluding repeatedly to the personal damage of growing up in a world of abusive men, while being full of determination to recover." It said, "So if you don't like Kaur, scroll on ... Kaur's style is artless and therefore sincere; its lack of workbench polish is the mark of immediacy."
