= Trista Mateer =

American poet and visual artist

Trista Mateer is an American poet and visual artist from Westminster, Maryland. She won the Goodreads Choice Award in 2015 for poetry with The Dogs I Have Kissed.

Her poetry collection Aphrodite Made Me Do It was also voted one of the best books of the year by Goodreads users in 2019. The collection, described as a feminist retelling of the mythological tales of Aphrodite, integrated visual imagery, including collages, edited photographs, and tarot card imagery.

Mateer promotes her poetry on social media, particularly Instagram, and has been described as an Instapoet. She is bisexual, and her queer identity is frequently incorporated into her poetry. Her decade-spanning poetry collection I Swear Somewhere This Works was the Bronze winner in LGBT+ Nonfiction for the 26th annual Foreword INDIES Best Books of the Year Awards.

== Bibliography ==
- Misc. Americana (independently published, 2026)
- Small Ghost (Central Avenue Publishing, 2024)
- Persephone Made Me Do It (Central Avenue Publishing, 2023)
- I Swear Somewhere This Works (independently published, 2023)
- Artemis Made Me Do It (Central Avenue Publishing, 2022)
- girl, isolated: poems, notes on healing, etc. (independently published, 2021)
- When the Stars Wrote Back (Random House, 2020)
- Aphrodite Made Me Do It (Central Avenue Publishing, 2019)
- Honeybee (Central Avenue Publishing, 2018)
- The Dogs I Have Kissed (independently published, 2015)
