= Nayyirah Waheed =

American poet

Nayyirah Waheed is a writer who has published two books of poetry and has been described as "perhaps the most famous poet on Instagram." Her poetry is known for its distinctive brevity and free verse style, covering topics such as love, identity, race, and feminism.

== Poetry ==
After finding it difficult to first publish salt., Waheed decided to self-publish. The poems compiled and published in salt. previously gained popularity through her social media accounts on Twitter and Instagram. Her second book of poetry, Nejma, was published in 2014.

Waheed has accused poet Rupi Kaur of plagiarism, a charge Kaur denies. However, Kaur has stated she takes inspiration from Waheed.

=== Reception ===
salt. has been described as "lines filled with force and grit" and a "collection of thoughts that build to a quiet crescendo against all the forces of racism, misogyny and xenophobia." Her poetry has been praised for calling "out to care for what is most imperiled, and how words can keep us going." Its brevity has also led to it being unfavorably categorized as Instapoetry, a term which has itself been criticized as reductive.
