= Creative Partnerships =

UK government 2002 creative learning programme

Creative Partnerships was the UK government's flagship creative learning programme, established in 2002 as part of the council's SR2000 settlement to develop young people's creativity through artists' engagement with schools in nominated areas across England. Following the 2010 election of the coalition government, funding was cut by the Department for Culture, Media and Sport and Arts Council England in 2011, with activity in schools ending in summer 2011.

== Aim ==
It aimed to build sustainable learning partnerships between schools, creative and cultural organisations, and individuals.

== Methods ==
Creative Partnerships facilitated many long-term links between schools and creative professionals, such as artists, architects, scientists and multimedia developers. Research reports covering many different aspects of the programme, conducted by researchers from a number of universities and consultancies, are available online. Reports include literature reviews about creativity and education, teacher identity, pupil wellbeing and tracking progression in creativity; evaluations and surveys of the programme; and qualitative research investigating pedagogy, wellbeing and progression.

== Programme delivery ==
From 2002 - 2009, representatives of local arts council offices delivered the programme in 36 areas of England. Peter Jenkinson OBE was the first national director of the programme and he was succeeded by Paul Collard. From 2009 - 2011, responsibility for Creative Partnership was transferred to Creativity, Culture and Education; 25 organizations were funded for that purpose. These were a range of independent and ‘host’ cultural organisations, with many of the individuals working there transferring from Arts Council England.

== Funding ==
The organisation was managed by Arts Council England and funded by the Department for Culture, Media and Sport with additional funding from the Department for Education. It was finally managed by Creativity, Culture and Education (CCE).

== Outcomes ==
Research by PricewaterhouseCoopers found that "young people involved with Creative Partnerships activities achieve, on average, 2.5 grades better at GCSE than their peers in similar schools".
