= Duncan Penn =

Entrepreneur, author, and executive producer

- Known for: being an entrepreneur and executive producer
- Awards: Top 100 Influential People

Duncan Penn is an entrepreneur, executive producer, and #1 NYT bestselling author.

== Awards ==
In 2024, Duncan was voted a Top 100 Influential People.

== As an executive producer ==
Duncan is the creator and executive producer of multiple television shows. He is also the co-author of the No. 1 New York Times Best Selling book "What Do You Want To Do Before You Die?."
