= Nikita Gill =

Poet and writer

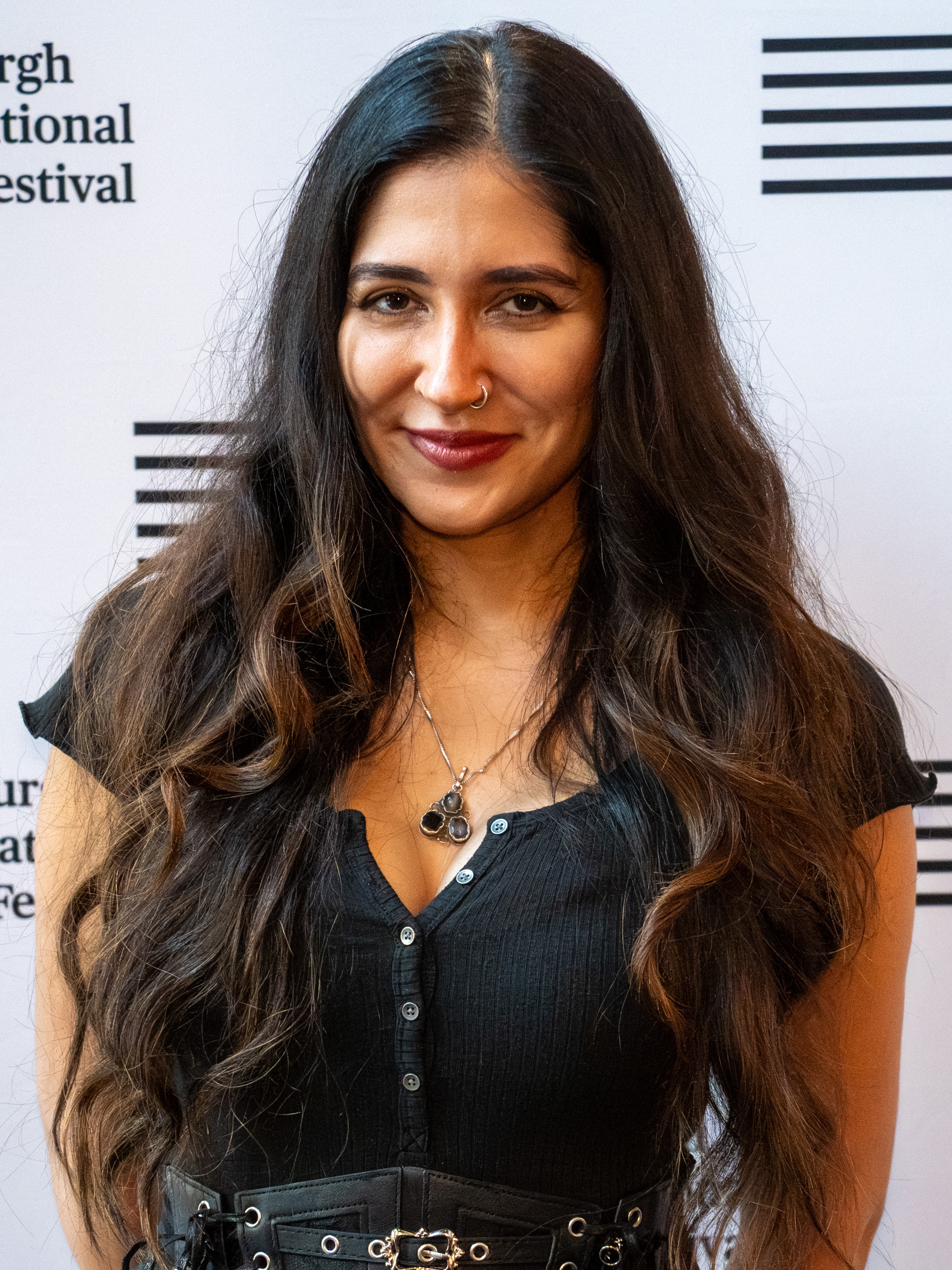
- Gill in 2025
- Born: Belfast, Northern Ireland
- Education: University for the Creative Arts
- Years active: 2016–present

Nikita Gill is an Irish-born British-Indian poet, playwright, writer, and illustrator based in south England. She has written and curated eight volumes of poetry and is one of the most followed poets on Instagram.

== Life ==
Gill was born in Belfast to Indian parents who had been living in Ireland. She has Irish citizenship and Overseas Citizenship of India. Her father was in the merchant navy. The family moved to New Delhi when Gill was six, and she grew up and was educated there. Gill studied design at university in New Delhi, and she completed a master's degree at the University for the Creative Arts. She worked as a cleaner and a care-giver after her education.

== Work ==
Gill's work was first published when she was 12 years old. She has published eight volumes of poetry, including Your Soul Is A River (2016), Wild Embers: Poems of rebellion, fire and beauty (2017), Fierce Fairytales: & Other Stories to Stir Your Soul (2018), Great Goddesses: Life lessons from myths and monsters (2019), Your Heart Is The Sea (2019), The Girl and the Goddess (2020), Where Hope Comes From: Poems of Resilience, Healing, and Light (2021), and These Are the Words: fearless versefind your voice (2022). Her debut novel, Hekate: The Witch (2025), a novel-in-verse published by Little, Brown Books for Young Readers, is a retelling of the Greek myth of Hekate and the first installment in the Goddesses of the Underworld trilogy. Her work offers reflections on love, and feminist re-tellings of fairy tales and Greek myths. She has been inspired by the works of Sylvia Plath, Maya Angelou and Robert Frost.

Gill wrote and performed her debut work for the stage, Maidens, Myths, and Monsters. She is an ambassador for National Poetry Day. She has appeared on the BBC, contributing to Woman's Hour on Radio Four, Free Thinking on Radio Three, and BBC Asian Network.

In October 2025, she published Hekate, a verse novel retelling the myth of the ancient Greek goddess of witchcraft and necromancy. Reviewing the book for The Guardian, the publication noted her portrayal of Hekate as a traumatized youth seeking love and belonging rather than a purely sinister deity, highlighting the narrative's focus on power, identity, and complex familial relationships.

== Personal life ==
Gill is openly bisexual.

== See also ==
- Instapoetry
