= Lang Leav =

Poet and writer

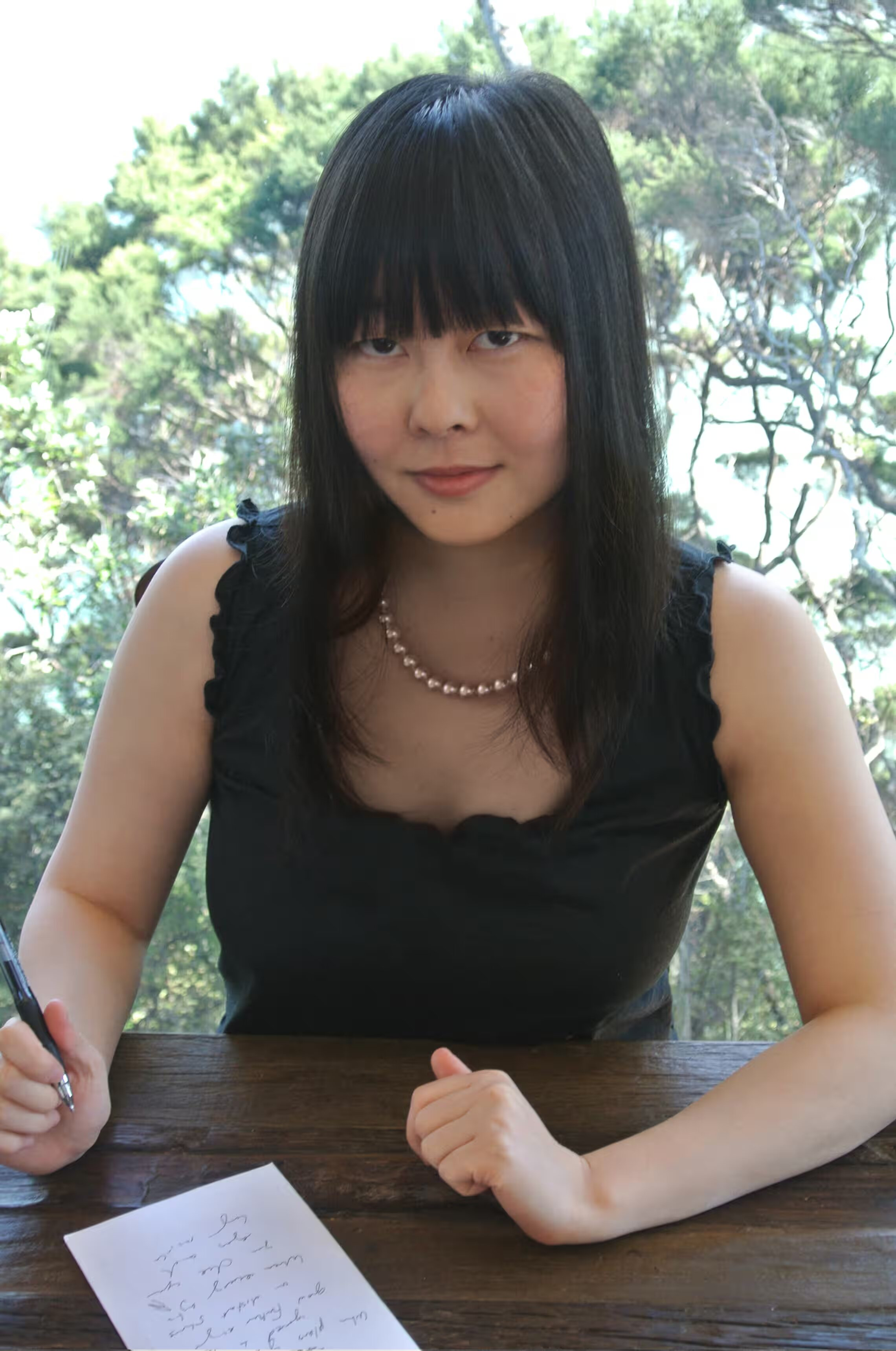
- Born: 8 September 1980 (age 46)
- Occupations: Poet, novelist, author
- Notable work: Lullabies
- Spouse: Michael Faudet

Lang Leav (born September 8, 1980) is an Australian novelist and poet.

== Early life ==
Leav was born in a refugee camp in Thailand where her parents were seeking refuge from the Khmer Rouge regime in Cambodia.

She is the youngest of three siblings. In 1981, her family migrated to Australia. Leav was raised in the suburb of Cabramatta, Sydney. She attended Cabramatta High School, graduating in 1998.

Leav's interest in literature started at a young age. She would transcribe her poetry into books she made by hand, which she then passed around to her peers at school.

== Education ==
Leav attended the College of Fine Arts in Sydney.

== Career ==
Before becoming a writer, Leav established a fashion label, Akina, which earned a Qantas Spirit of Youth Award. In 2012, Leav began posting her poetry on Tumblr and her work amassed a large following. In 2013, she self-published her first collection of poetry and prose titled Love and Misadventure. Leav signed with the Writers House literary agency and was subsequently offered a publishing deal with Andrews McMeel. The book was an Amazon bestseller. Leav released Lullabies the following year, which won the Goodreads Choice Award for Poetry.

Leav subsequently published another five poetry titles: Memories (2015) The Universe of Us, (2017) Sea of Strangers (2018) and Love Looks Pretty on You (2018), all of which were nominated for the Goodreads Choice Award for Poetry. Her debut YA novel Sad Girls became a Straits Times Bestseller, although reviews were mixed.

Leav's second YA novel, Poemsia, was also a Straits Times Bestseller and drew mainly positive reviews, with Marie Claire stating: 'Leav writes masterfully from the perspective of her protagonist, an aspiring poet, and gives readers a backstage glimpse into the new-wave poetry movement.'

Leav has illustrated several of her books, including Love & Misadventure, Lullabies, Memories and The Universe of Us.

Leav has been a guest speaker at a number of international writers festival, including The Sydney Writers Festival, The Sharjah Book Fair, Auckland Writers Festival and was a headliner at the Mass Poetry Festival in Boston, Massachusetts.

In 2019, Penguin Random House secured the audio rights to Leav's novel Poemsia in addition to her poetry titles, including The Universe of Us, Sea of Strangers and Love Looks Pretty on You.

Leav's debut in literary fiction, Others Were Emeralds, was sold to Harper Perennial in a pre-empt, and international rights were secured at auction by Penguin Random House, Australia. The novel, based on Leav's immigrant roots, was praised by critics, with Publishers Weekly describing it as "A heartrending novel." Booklist wrote, "Leav's coming-of-age debut is poetic and lyrical, her prose rich in beautiful imagery."

=== Style and inspiration ===
Leav's poetry was described by the New York Times as frank poems about love, sex, heartache and betrayal.

Leav cites Emily Dickinson and Robert Frost as influences.

Leav attributes her writing style to her childhood role as translator for her immigrant parents, stating: "Language had to be distilled as things can get lost in translation."

== Criticism ==
Leav is occasionally attributed to the Instapoetry movement, which has been panned by the literary establishment as being derivative.

== Bibliography ==
=== Poetry and prose collection ===
- Love and Misadventure (2013)
- Lullabies (2014)
- Memories (2015)
- The Universe of Us (2016)
- Sea of Strangers (2018)
- Love Looks Pretty on You (2019)
- September Love (2020)
- The Gift of Everything (2021)
- The Universe and Us (2021)
- Self-Love for Small-Town Girls (2023)
- A Letter to my Mother at Immigration (2024)

=== Poetry ===
- Anthology of Love (2017)

=== YA ===
- Sad Girls (2017)
- Poemsia (2019)

=== Literary Fiction ===
- Others Were Emeralds (2023)
- I Know the Ants (2026)

== See also ==
- Instapoetry
