= Mirage (Mell album) =

- CD+DVD edition

Studio album by Mell
- Released: October 27, 2010
- Recorded: 2010
- Genre: J-pop
- Label: Geneon

Mell chronology
MELLSCOPE (2008)	Mirage (2010)

MIRAGE
- CD only edition

Mirage is the second studio album from the I've Sound singer, Mell, released on October 27, 2010. The album contains eight new songs, one old song from an album released on Comic Market away back 2002, "Infection", which was used in an episode of the hit anime series Highschool of the Dead, and a remix of her famous song "Red Fraction" which was used as an opening theme for the OVA of the anime series Black Lagoon.

This album contained her three singles "Proof/No Vain", "Kill" and "Rideback". The album came in a limited CD+DVD edition (GNCV-1023) and a regular CD-only edition (GNCV-1024). The DVD will contain the PV for the title track "Mirage" and the making for her activity report for the year 2010. Mirage peaked at number 27 on the Oricon Albums Chart.

== Track listing ==
=== CD ===
1. mirage – 5:27
  Composition/Arrangement: Kazuya Takase
  Lyrics: MELL
2. KILL – 4:53
  Composition/Arrangement: Kazuya Takase
  Lyrics: MELL
3. Princess bloom – 4:51
  Composition/Arrangement: Ken Morioka
  Lyrics: MELL
4. Fascination – 4:59
  Composition: Tomoyuki Nakazawa
  Arrangement: Tomoyuki Nakazawa, Takeshi Ozaki
  Lyrics: MELL
5. FIXER – 4:56
  Composition/Arrangement: Kazuya Takase
  Lyrics: MELL
6. Sabaku no Yuki (砂漠の雪) – 5:55
  Composition/Arrangement: C.G mix
  Lyrics: MELL
7. Proof – 5:33
  Composition/Arrangement: Kazuya Takase
  Lyrics: MELL
8. Teleportation guy – 5:54
  Composition/Arrangement: Ken Morioka
  Lyrics: MELL
9. Love illusion – 5:01
  Composition: C.G mix
  Arrangement: C.G mix, Takeshi Ozaki
  Lyrics: MELL
10. Infection – 4:24
  Composition/Arrangement: Maiko Iuchi
  Lyrics: MELL, seven-lon
11. Rideback – 4:42
  Composition/Arrangement: Kazuya Takase
  Lyrics: MELL
12. MY PRECIOUS – 7:48
  Composition/Arrangement: Ken Morioka
  Lyrics: MELL
13. Red Fraction -IO drive mix- – 5:00
  Composition/Arrangement: Kazuya Takase
  Lyrics: MELL

=== DVD ===
1. Mirage (PV)
2. Making Of Activity Report 2010
