= Mellscope =

MELLSCOPE
- Regular Edition

Studio album by Mell
- Released: August 20, 2008
- Recorded: 2008
- Genre: J-pop, electro-industrial, industrial pop, electronic rock
- Length: 58:12
- Label: Geneon

Mell chronology
MELLSCOPE (2008)	MIRAGE (2010)

MELLSCOPE
- Limited edition

MELLSCOPE is the first studio album from the I've Sound singer, Mell, released on August 20, 2008. The album contains four new songs, two old songs from an eroge, two remixed old songs (including a remix of her first song with I've Sound), and four songs from her first three released singles, namely "Red fraction", "Proof/no vain", and "Virgin's high!/kicks!".

The album comes in a limited or CD+DVD edition (GNCV-1005) and a regular or CD-only edition (GNCV-1006). The DVD will contain the PV for "SCOPE" and alternative PVs for "no vain" and "kicks!". The DVD also contains a documentary of MELL's time in France, and documents both the photo shoot for MELLSCOPE as well as her work with Deep Forest. Lastly, Deep Forest's Eric Mouquet is interviewed in full English, including Japanese subtitles.

== Track listing (CD) ==
1. SCOPE - 4:21
  Composition/Arrangement: Kazuya Takase
  Lyrics: MELL
2. Red fraction - 3:41
  Composition/Arrangement: Kazuya Takase
  Lyrics: MELL
3. Way beyond there - 5:04
  Composition: Tomoyuki Nakazawa
  Arrangement: Tomoyuki Nakazawa, Takeshi Ozaki
  Lyrics: MELL
4. repeat - 6:38
  Composition/Arrangement/Lyrics: Kazuya Takase
5. Virgin's high! - 4:21
  Composition/Arrangement: Maiko Iuchi
  Lyrics: MELL
6. no vain - 5:59
  Composition/Arrangement: Kazuya Takase
  Lyrics: MELL
7. Permit - 4:09
  Composition: Tomoyuki Nakazawa
  Arrangement: Tomoyuki Nakazawa, Takeshi Ozaki
  Lyrics: MELL (English Translation: Harry Yoshida)
8. Under Superstition - 4:59
  Composition/Arrangement: Maiko Iuchi
  Lyrics: MELL
9. kicks! - 3:49
  Composition/Arrangement: Kazuya Takase
  Lyrics: MELL
10. The first finale in me - 5:09
  Composition/Arrangement: Tomoyuki Nakazawa
  Lyrics: MELL
11. Utsukushiku Ikitai -10 Years anniversary mix- (美しく生きたい) - 5:13
  Composition/Lyrics: Kazuya Takase
  Arrangement: Kazuya Takase, Tomoyuki Nakazawa
12. repeat -Deep Forest remix- - 4:49
  Composition/Lyrics: Kazuya Takase
  Arrangement: Eric Mouquet (Deep Forest)

== Track listing (DVD) ==
1. SCOPE (PV)
2. no vain -another side-
3. kicks! -another side-
4. Documentary of MELL's time in France
5. Interview with Eric Mouquet of Deep Forest
