= Rideback =

Rideback may refer to:

- Rideback (manga), a Japanese manga series
- "Rideback" (song), a 2009 single by Mell
- Rideback (production company), an American film production company
