= List of Black Lagoon episodes =

Box cover art of the first Black Lagoon DVD volume, released in North America by Geneon Entertainment on May 22, 2007

Black Lagoon is an anime television series adapted from the manga series by Rei Hiroe. Directed by Sunao Katabuchi and produced by Madhouse, it consists of two seasons produced for television, and one in original video animation format. The two seasons, each twelve episodes in length, are titled Black Lagoon— which was co-produced by Shogakukan—and Black Lagoon: The Second Barrage. The OVA, titled Black Lagoon: Roberta's Blood Trail, consists of only five episodes. The series takes place during the mid-1990s and follows the adventures of Rokuro "Rock" Okajima, a Japanese businessman who is abducted by, and eventually joins a group of outlaws known as the "Lagoon Company".

The first season premiered on Chiba TV from April 8 through June 24, 2006, the second from October 2 through December 18 on Sendai Television and Kyushu Asahi Broadcasting. All twenty-four episodes were then released in Japan on DVD across 12 volumes from July 26, 2006, through June 27, 2007. Blu-ray Disc releases—eight volumes in total—followed from December 23, 2009, through March 25, 2010. In North America, these seasons were first released across six DVD volumes with English and Japanese audio tracks and English subtitles from May 22, 2007, through October 28, 2008. The first three of these were distributed by Geneon Entertainment USA before Funimation took over distribution of the series in mid 2008, and released a hybrid DVD and Blu-ray Disc collection of both seasons on December 4, 2012. In Europe, MVM Entertainment released them across six DVD volumes from March 10, 2008, through January 5, 2009, and across two Blu-ray Disc collections on July 30, 2012. In Australia and New Zealand, Madman Entertainment released them across six DVD volumes from March 19 through September 17, 2008. The OVA was released in Japan simultaneously on DVD and Blu-ray Disc volumes containing one episode each between July 17, 2010, and June 22, 2011. For the North American market, Funimation announced a hybrid release of the OVA for August 6, 2013.

Six pieces of theme music were used for the series. For the first 23 episodes, "Red Fraction" by Mell serves as opening theme, and "Don't Look Behind" by Edison is used as closing theme, except for the fifteenth episode, which features "The World of Midnight" by Minako Obata. Episode twenty-four lacks an opening theme and uses "Peach Headz Addiction" by Breath Frequency as closing theme. The last five episodes use "Red Fraction –IO Drive mix–" by Mell as opening theme. "When Johnny Comes Marching Home" by Edison is used as closing theme for episodes 25 through 28. "This Moment: Prayer in the Light" by Minako "mooki" Obata is used as the closing theme in the final episode.

== Series overview ==
Season	Episodes	Originally released	
Season	Episodes	First released	Last released
1	12	April 9, 2006	June 25, 2006
2	12	October 3, 2006	December 19, 2006
OVA	5	July 17, 2010	June 22, 2011

== Episodes ==
=== Season 1 (2006) ===
No. overall	No. in season	Title	Directed by	Storyboarded by	Animation directed by	Original release date	English air date
1	1	"The Black Lagoon"	Kenichi Kawamura	Satoshi Nishimura	Toshiyuki Kanno	April 9, 2006	October 26, 2007
While on a business trip at sea for his company, Rokuro Okajima is abducted by the members of the Lagoon Company: Dutch, Revy, and Benny. After obtaining a confidential disc for their client, Balalaika, the head of Hotel Moscow and a part of the Russian Mafia, Revy takes Rokuro as a hostage onto their ship, the Black Lagoon, to hold for ransom. Despite this, Rokuro begins to bond with the members of the Lagoon Company, and Dutch gives him the nickname "Rock". Meanwhile, the board of Rock's company gives Kageyama, Rock's superior, the authority to pursue the missing disc, and Kageyama hires a mercenary group to attack the Lagoon Company when they stop in the port city of Roanapur. The group dispatches the majority of the mercenaries and escape to the Black Lagoon in their car. However, the Lagoon Company is contacted by Kageyama, who informs Rock that he has been declared dead by the company, and shortly afterwards a heavily armed helicopter gunship from the same mercenary group starts chasing the Black Lagoon.
2	2	"Mangrove Heaven"	Kenichi Kawamura	Kenichi Kawamura	Yasuhisa Katō	April 16, 2006	November 2, 2007
To evade the gunship, Dutch drives the Black Lagoon down a river, but reaches a dead end. Realizing the futility of their situation, the members of the Lagoon Company begin to plan for the worst. Despite this, Rock concocts a plan to defeat the gunship, deducing that the gunship pilot's mentality is akin to that of a duelist, wanting to face their opponent face-to-face. Following Rock's plan, Dutch uses a sunken ship as a springboard to launch the Black Lagoon into the air and destroy the gunship with torpedoes. The Lagoon Company manages to deliver the disk to Balalaika, who gives the disk to Kageyama, as he had made a deal with the Russian Mafia as a contingency. Instead of returning with Kageyama, however, Rock decides to stay with the Lagoon Company, who accept him as a new member.
3	3	"Ring-Ding Ship Chase"	Sunao Katabuchi & Tetsurō Araki	Sunao Katabuchi	Cindy H. Yamauchi	April 23, 2006	November 9, 2007
While staying in Roanapur, where the Lagoon Company is situated, Dutch is accosted by Chin, a gangster who warns Dutch off continuing to work for Balalaika. Dutch ignores his warnings and receives a job from an anonymous employer. As the group leaves on the Black Lagoon, Chin contacts Luak, the head of a pirate gang, to kill the Lagoon Company, and Luak attacks the Black Lagoon with a squadron of boats. Dutch tricks two of the boats into destroying each other via friendly fire, and Revy destroys the rest with an M79 grenade launcher and a PM-63 RAK while leaping from boat to boat. Subsequently, the job is revealed to be a hoax set up by Chin, who is killed by Balalaika.
4	4	"Die Rückkehr des Adlers"	Fumie Muroi	Sunao Katabuchi	Fumie Muroi	April 30, 2006	November 16, 2007
The Lagoon Company is dispatched to retrieve a painting, The Twelve Knights Led by Brunhilda, from a sunken World War II-era U-boat that left Germany at the eve of Nazi Germany's defeat and was sunk by the United States Navy near Jakarta. Dutch purchases scuba equipment for Rock and Revy to use in retrieving the painting, and Benny instructs the two to enter the submarine via its torpedo tubes and create a hole to exit. After Rock and Revy, with an APS underwater assault rifle, begin descending, the Black Lagoon is attacked by a group of neo-Nazis who fire TOW missiles at the ship.
5	5	"Eagle Hunting and Hunting Eagles"	Kunio Katsuki	Sunao Katabuchi	Yoshiko Okuda	May 7, 2006	November 23, 2007
The Black Lagoon evades the TOW missiles, but Dutch and Benny observe the Nazis send a team underwater to retrieve the painting. Inside the submarine, Rock and Revy locate the painting, but Revy insists on searching the ship for medals and other valuables. When Rock voices his disapproval, Revy asserts that her turbulent childhood pushed her to reject God, love, and other emotions and to believe that everything has no value except for the money it can bring. The two are attacked by the Nazis and in the midst of the firefight, Rock loses the painting. The Nazis obtain it and retreat back to the surface with it. Revy attempts to pursue them, but Rock forces her to abandon the fight when the Nazis use machine guns to fire into the water. Rock and Revy return to the Black Lagoon, where Dutch plans an assault on the Nazis' ship to retrieve the painting.
6	6	"Moonlit Hunting Grounds"	Kenichi Kawamura	Kazuhiro Soeta	Kiyoshi Tateishi, Masahiro Kimura, Kunio Katsuki, Fumie Muroi, Masaki Hinata, Kazuhiro Soeta & Hideki Inoue	May 14, 2006	November 30, 2007
Dutch and Revy leave the Black Lagoon on a motorboat to raid the Nazis' ship. With the Nazis celebrating their retrieval of the painting, the two easily enter the ship, and Dutch instructs Revy to distract the crew while he searches for the painting. Revy obliges, killing all the Nazis she comes across, but Dutch is forced to stop her when she tries to kill the civilian crew members, which Dutch attributes to Revy's unease at accepting Rock into the crew. Dutch eventually finds Ratchman, the Nazi commander, talking to Sir Alfred, a former Schutzstaffel member that ordered Ratchman to retrieve the painting. Dutch deduces that Alfred hired the Lagoon Company to doubly insure that he would acquire the painting, and Ratchman is furious at this revelation. After Alfred ends the conversation, Dutch and Revy kill Ratchman, finishing their mission.
7	7	"Calm Down, Two Men"	Kenichi Kawamura & Yoshihisa Matsumoto	Kazuya Komai & Sunao Katabuchi	Akira Watanabe	May 21, 2006	December 7, 2007
Dutch dispatches Rock and Revy on errands throughout Roanapur, and Revy is displeased that she is forced to perform them with Rock. When they stop at the Church of Violence, an organization posing as religious missionaries in order to traffic drugs and illegal weaponry, Rock manages to use his business savvy to repair an agreement with Yolanda, the head of the Ripoff Church, after Revy draws a gun on her. Yolanda is impressed by Rock's skill and asks Revy to emulate him. Afterwards, Rock and Revy begin a heated argument at a restaurant, as Rock is furious at Revy for beginning to act like his former superiors in Japan, leaving Revy at a loss for words. Chief Watsap, the head of the corrupt Roanapur police arrives, scolds them for causing a ruckus, and takes them in. They reconcile on the backseat of a police car.
8	8	"Rasta Blasta"	Tetsurō Araki	Tetsurō Araki	Hideki Inoue	May 28, 2006	December 14, 2007
The Lagoon Company is contracted by a Colombian cartel to deliver a hostage, and Dutch assigns Rock to watch the boy while they are in transit. Rock learns that the boy is Garcia Lovelace, the heir to one of the wealthiest families in South America, and that the cartel had abducted Garcia after his father refused to allow the cartel to intimidate him. Concerned with the circumstances surrounding Garcia's abduction, Dutch contacts Balalaika for information on the Lovelace family and the cartel. As they enter Roanapur, Garcia is confident that he will be saved by Roberta, the Lovelace family maid. Meanwhile, Roberta is traveling through Roanapur looking for Garcia, and is confronted by members of the cartel in a bar. As the members of the Lagoon Company and Garcia enter the same bar, Roberta begins a firefight with the cartel members.
9	9	"Maid to Kill"	Tetsurō Araki	Tetsurō Araki	Hideki Inoue	June 4, 2006	December 21, 2007
Roberta dispatches the majority of the cartel members, and Garcia is shocked at her combat prowess. Revy inadvertently reveals the Lagoon Company's presence during the firefight, and is knocked unconscious when Roberta fires a 40 mm grenade at her. Garcia asks the Lagoon Company to take him with them, and they manage to escape. One of the cartel members identifies Roberta as a former FARC guerrilla with a large bounty on her head. Roberta destroys the bar with grenades and steals a car to pursue the Lagoon Company. Having determined Roberta's identity, Balalaika mobilizes soldiers to aid the Lagoon Company. When Roberta catches up to the Lagoon Company, Dutch manages to destroy the engine of her car before almost being pulled out of his car by her, and Benny begins driving into alleys and side-streets. As they turn back onto the main road, however, Roberta drives another car into them and latches onto the back of their car with a trench knife.
10	10	"The Unstoppable Chambermaid"	Tetsurō Araki	Tetsurō Araki	Masaki Hinata	June 11, 2006	December 28, 2007
Roberta forces Benny to crash the car in the port, but awakens Revy in the process. The two begin a firefight, evenly matched against one another. Balalaika arrives with a full complement of soldiers, and forces the two to stop fighting. She explains Roberta's background to Garcia, noting that she is a famed FARC guerrilla wanted around the globe for numerous assassinations, bombings, and related terrorist activity. Despite this, Garcia claims that Roberta is an accepted member of the Lovelace family. To finish their duel, Roberta and Revy begin a fistfight, with the onlookers making bets on the winner. The two knock each other out, and Garcia leaves for home with Roberta. Afterwards, Rock asks Benny about the background of Balalaika and her soldiers, and Benny reveals that they are former Soviet special forces that distinguished themselves in the Soviet–Afghan War.
11	11	"Lock'n Load Revolution"	Kenichi Kawamura	Kenichi Kawamura	Akiko Asaki (Note: Kazuhiro Soeta directed the action sequences)	June 18, 2006	January 4, 2008
The Lagoon Company is approached by Mr. Chang, the head of the Roanapur Triad, to transport a briefcase containing information on the Protectors of the Islamic Front, a terrorist group, to the CIA. While they are conversing, they come under attack from the terrorists, but Chang and Revy dispatch the attackers. The group leaves on the Black Lagoon, but are pursued by ships belonging to the terrorists due to the foresight of Masahiro Takenaka, one of the leaders of the Protectors of the Islamic Front. Revy and Rock are forced to leave the Black Lagoon and seek a land route. Takenaka poses as their getaway driver, and although Revy sees through his charade, he takes Rock and escapes. Revy is saved by Shenhua, an assassin in Chang's employ, and she convinces Shenhua and her partner Leigharch to save Rock to retrieve the documents.
12	12	"Guerrillas in the Jungle"	Atsushi Nigorikawa	Tetsurō Araki	Masaki Hinata	June 25, 2006	January 11, 2008
Takenaka begins interrogating Rock, revealing that he is a former member of the Japanese Red Army. When Rock questions him as to why he continues to fight for a lost cause, he comments that he fights in order to give meaning to the sacrifices he made in the past for his beliefs. Due to Takenaka's jovial method of conducting the interrogation, Ibraha, Takenaka's comrade, asks Takenaka if he can torture Rock, but Takenaka refuses. Revy and Shenhua raid the camp, escape with Rock, and are followed by a fleet of vehicles under Ibraha's command. Revy and Shenhua dispatch the majority of the vehicles, and Ibraha orders the remainder of his men to continue the pursuit. When Ibraha refuses to order a retreat, Takenaka shoots him and gives the order himself. Revy delivers the documents to the CIA agents, and admonishes Rock not to be captured again.

=== Season 2: The Second Barrage (2006) ===
No. overall	No. in season	Title	Directed by	Storyboarded by	Animation directed by	Original release date	English air date
13	1	"The Vampire Twins Comen"	Hisato Shimoda	Sunao Katabuchi	Junko Watanabe	October 3, 2006	January 18, 2008
Due to a spree of killings aimed at Hotel Moscow, Chang organizes a meeting between the major crime lords of Roanapur: himself, Balalaika, Abrego, a Colombian cartel boss, and Verrocchio, the leader of the Roanapur branch of the Italian mafia. Balalaika spurns Chang's attempts to foster cooperation, and insists that Hotel Moscow will find and eliminate the assassins. The following morning, two of Balalaika's subordinates are killed, and Watsap reveals that the assassins are a pair of twin children. A large bounty is placed on the twins, and as the city begins to fill with bounty hunters, Eda, a member of the Ripoff Church, suggests to Revy that they join the hunt as well. At the twins' hideout, their sponsors are disgusted to find that the twins are brutally torturing one of Balalaika's subordinates. Meanwhile, Balalaika asks Rock for information concerning the twins' speaking mannerisms.
14	2	"Bloodsport Fairytale"	Tsuyoshi Yoshimoto	Sunao Katabuchi	Hideki Inoue	October 10, 2006	January 25, 2008
Rock determines that the twins are from Romania, and Balalaika asks Rowan, the owner of a strip club, for all the Romanian snuff and pornographic films he has. On a meeting with Chang, she reveals to him that she found the twins in one of the films, wherein they were called Hansel and Gretel, and mentions that many orphans from Nicolae Ceauşescu's regime were sold on the black market and forced to participate in paedophilic snuff films. After examining some documents she hands him, Chang agrees to form an alliance with Balalaika to eliminate the twins, and Balalaika mobilizes her Visotoniki, the former soldiers that fought with her in Afghanistan. The twins arrive at Verrocchio's headquarters, kill him, and exchange fire with Chang on their way out. To distract the bounty hunters looking for them, the twins set up a decoy car, but are confronted by the Visotoniki and ultimately cornered by Eda and Revy.
15	3	"Swan Song at Dawn"	Fumie Muroi	Sunao Katabuchi	Shinsuke Yanagi	October 17, 2006	February 1, 2008
Eda and Revy begin a gunfight with the twins, but the Visotoniki arrive, putting an end to their fight. Hansel and Gretel decide to separate and Revy returns home. Gretel corners Eda, and while holding her as a hostage, requests that she find a getaway boat for herself and her brother. Meanwhile, the Visotoniki engage Hansel and despite his best efforts, suffer no casualties while attacking him for an entire night. Hansel eventually encounters Balalaika in a park, but is sniped by her men. Elsewhere, Gretel hires the Lagoon Company to transport her, and Rock listens to her recount her past. Sickened at the situation she had to endure due to Ceauşescu's regime and black marketeers, he vents his anger at Benny, who asserts that Rock cannot prevent all the injustice in the world. When the Black Lagoon reaches the getaway point, Gretel is killed by a hired gun from Hotel Moscow, but Rock notes that she died peacefully staring at the sky.
16	4	"Greenback Jane"	Kenichi Kawamura	Ryosuke Nakamura & Sunao Katabuchi	Ki Doo Kim	October 24, 2006	February 8, 2008
Greenback Jane, a money counterfeiter working for a Florida crime syndicate, angers her bosses by breaking a deadline and makes a run for it. Asking for entry at the Church of Violence, where Eda and Revy are drinking, she is turned away by Eda. Members of the Florida mafia arrive moments later and fire into the church, prompting Eda and Revy to respond in kind. They are joined by Rico, an apprentice priest, and Yolanda, and the mafia members are driven away. Inside the church, Jane proves her counterfeiting skill, and Eda sends her to a motel. Russel, a member of the Florida mafia, begins to collect bounty hunters in Roanapur, including Shenhua and Sawyer the Cleaner, a mute that uses a chainsaw in battle. Despite their willingness to take the bounty, the bounty hunters criticize Russel for his inexperience in the city and his cowboy appearance. As the bounty hunters depart, Rock, Eda, and Revy arrive at Jane's motel.
17	5	"The Roanapur Freakshow Circus"	Takanori Suzuki	Sunao Katabuchi	Nozomu Abe	October 31, 2006	February 15, 2008
The bounty hunters arrive at Jane's motel, and she escapes due to preparations Eda had made beforehand. Jane sees Eda and agrees to pay any price if Eda saves her. Eda and Revy force the bounty hunters to retreat, then head for the Lagoon Company's dock. When Russel arrives at the scene, Shenhua demands more money since Eda and Revy are involved. Eda's plan to escape on the Black Lagoon is stymied since Dutch and Benny took it on a job, and they are forced to wait in the dock house, where they are surrounded and attacked by the bounty hunters. As Shenhua and Sawyer arrive, Revy curses their misfortune, and Rock and Jane are forced to head to the roof when the building is set on fire. Meanwhile, Dutch begins speeding back into port and Revy sets a trap for Shenhua.
18	6	"Mr. Benny's Good Fortune"	Hisato Shimoda & Hiromitsu Kanazawa	Sunao Katabuchi	Masaki Hinata	November 7, 2006	February 22, 2008
Shenhua evades the trap, but is shot by Eda after Revy acts as a decoy. On the roof, Rock and Jane are confronted by Sawyer, but she goes into shock after losing her electrolarynx in an explosion. Lotton the Wizard confronts Revy, who shoots him. As the building collapses, Dutch and Benny return to port, and Revy, Eda, Jane, and Rock jump onto the boat along with several of the bounty hunters. Dutch begins using evasive maneuvers to cause the bounty hunters to fall off the boat, and Revy dispatches the remaining bounty hunters except Russel, who manages to make it to the engine room, where he is confronted by Eda. Russel recalls seeing Eda in Washington, D.C., and Eda admits to being a CIA officer before killing him. In the computer room, Benny manages to access Jane's counterfeiting files using his hacking talents, and Jane kisses him in return. Back at the dock, Lotton the Wizard, who survived thanks to his bulletproof vest, offers to help Shenhua reach medical help for her gunshot wound.
19	7	"Fujiyama Gangsta Paradise"	Hideki Okamoto & Kenichi Kawamura	Sunao Katabuchi	Kiyoshi Tateishi & Masaki Hinata	November 14, 2006	February 29, 2008
Rock is hired by Balalaika to be her translator on a trip to Japan, and Revy accompanies him. Balalaika negotiates with the Washimine Group, a yakuza group fallen on hard times, and agrees to destroy the Kosa Council, another yakuza group, due to its ill treatment of the Washimine Group. Following the conclusion of their agreement, Balalaika orders an explosion at a Kosa Council base. Afterwards, Revy and Rock go to a Japanese festival, but Revy causes a scene when she loses at a shooting game. She is stopped by Ginji Matsuzaki, one of the festival vendors, and Ginji's companion prevents them from starting a fight. She and Rock exchange pleasantries, and as she leaves, she tells Rock that her name is Yukio. The following day, Tsugio Bando, the head of the Washimine Group, asks Ginji to aid him, recalling that Ginji was feared among all yakuza for his use of a katana in battle. Ginji refuses, citing the lack of justice in Bando's methods. Meanwhile, Rock visits his parents' home, and Revy unwinds by playing gunmen with a group of children.
20	8	"The Succession"	Kenichi Kawamura	Koichiro Hiraki	Masaki Hinata	November 21, 2006	March 7, 2008
Due to the brutality of Balalaika's attacks on the Kosa Council, Bando organizes another meeting with her, but learns that she will execute her plans as she sees fit. After the meeting, Rock is beaten by Chaka, a brazen Washimine Group member, and Revy promises to kill him. After asking Benny to send Revy her signature pistols, Rock meets Yukio again. The two discuss one's ability to choose their path in life, and Yukio quotes Jean-Paul Sartre. When she leaves, she tells Rock her surname is Washimine, and Rock realizes that she is part of the Washimine Group. At her home, Bando and Ginji discuss the future of the Washimine Group, noting that only a direct descendant of the previous boss can claim his position. The following day, Bando attempts to assassinate Balalaika, but fails and Balalaika kills him. After hearing this, Yukio, as the granddaughter of the previous leader, agrees to become the leader of the Washimine Group and Ginji swears his loyalty to her.
21	9	"Two Father's Little Soldier Girls"	Kunio Katsuki	Kunio Katsuki & Sunao Katabuchi	Kazuya Saitō & Masaki Hinata	November 28, 2006	March 14, 2008
Balalaika reminisces about her past. She recalls that she intended to enter the Olympic rifle shooting event to restore the reputation of her father, but found herself at the front lines in the Soviet war in Afghanistan, and that following the war, she and the soldiers formerly under her command joined the Russian Mafia. Yukio severs her ties with her former life by staying late at school with her friend Maki and being picked up by her henchmen despite Maki's pleas. The new head of the Washimine Group, Yukio orders a counterattack on Hotel Moscow, which is led by Ginji. Revy, after picking up a package from Benny with her pistols, accompanies Rock to speak with Yukio about withdrawing from the conflict. When Yukio returns home, she is kidnapped by Chaka and his men. Ginji arrives at the house shortly after Rock, who convinces him to let Revy aid him in recovering Yukio. When Ginji asks why Rock is helping him, Rock responds that he cannot stand Yukio's decision to throw away a normal life for that of the criminal underworld.
22	10	"The Dark Tower"	Takao Abo	Takao Abo	Hideki Inoue	December 5, 2006	March 21, 2008
Revy and Ginji arrive at a bowling alley where Chaka is holding Yukio, and they dispatch his men. Chaka attempts to leave with Yukio, but Rock takes Yukio and escapes. Chaka then meets Revy in a hallway and when he attempts to start a duel with her, she leads him to Ginji. Chaka attempts to shoot Ginji, but he cuts the incoming bullet in two with his katana. He then removes Chaka's arms with his katana and drowns him in the adjacent pool. Elsewhere, Yukio criticizes Rock for attempting to save her from falling into the criminal underworld, as she believes that he exists in a "twilight" between his old life in Japan and his criminal life in Roanapur, and is unwilling to let go of either of them. The following day, Balalaika begins her plans for the destruction of the Washimine Group.
23	11	"Snow White's Payback"	Sunao Katabuchi	Sunao Katabuchi	Taiki Imamura, Takeshi Morita & Kazuya Morimae	December 12, 2006	March 28, 2008
Balalaika's attacks reduce the manpower of the Washimine Group to a third of its former strength, and Yukio orders the Washimine Group members to abandon their strongholds to avoid the attacks. Discovering that Hotel Moscow is using electric company vans to execute their attacks, Yukio and Ginji use a similar van to rob a bank to point the police towards the Hotel Moscow vans. Following the robbery, Yukio muses about traveling to Roanapur with Ginji to start a yakuza group there. Revy and Rock meet with Balalaika, and Rock asks Balalaika to end the assault on the Washimine Group. Balalaika responds by holding Rock at gunpoint, but she releases Rock after he claims he is a villain like her. In a park near his parents' house, Rock admits to Revy that he returned to Japan to sever his ties with his former life, and that he has found the resolve to do so.
24	12	"The Gunslingers"	Sunao Katabuchi	Sunao Katabuchi	Masaki Hinata, Akiko Asaki, Fumie Muroi, Yoshiko Okuda, Chie Uratani, Hideki Inoue & Masanori Shino (Note: Kazuhiro Soeta and Kunio Katsuki directed the action and effects sequences)	December 19, 2006	April 4, 2008
Rock joins Balalaika for her talks with the Kosa Council, and asks her to completely destroy the Washimine Group to force Yukio to adopt a normal life. Balalaika then kills the leader of the Kosa Council, and informs Rock that Hotel Moscow's attacks on the Washimine Group will cease. Rock leaves with Revy on a motorcycle. They are rammed by a van driven by Yukio and Ginji, who kidnap Rock and make him lead them to Hotel Moscow's base. Revy steals a truck and forces Yukio to stop the van. Ginji and Revy fight while Rock attempts to reason with Yukio. He deduces that Yukio felt forced into becoming part of the criminal underworld, and she admits that she wished her normal life could continue. This admission causes Ginji to pause momentarily, allowing Revy to fatally shoot him. Due to the deaths she feels responsible for, Yukio apologizes to Rock and commits suicide using Ginji's katana. When Rock returns to Roanapur, Balalaika sends him a picture of Yukio, and Rock remarks that he wants to see Roanapur from the "twilight" he is in.

=== OVA: Roberta's Blood Trail (2010–11) ===
No. overall	No. in OVA	Title	Directed by	Storyboarded by	Animation directed by	Original release date	English release date
25	1	"Collateral Massacre"	Fumie Muroi	Sunao Katabuchi	Masanori Shino, Masaki Hinata, Chie Uratani, Masahiro Kimura, Taiki Imamura & Yasuhisa Katō	July 17, 2010	August 6, 2013
A year after Roberta's employer, Diego Lovelace, dies in an explosion set by US agents at an event of an emerging left-wing party in Venezuela, she disappears to hunt down and kill the perpetrators. Some time later, Garcia Lovelace is accompanied to Roanapur by his maid and bodyguard Fabiola Iglesias. Following a shootout with enemies Roberta made during her last visit to the city, Fabiola takes the Lagoon Company to see her young employer, whom she finds in the presence of Chang. Garcia and Fabiola recount to their guests what has transpired and make a job offer, which Dutch declines in the name of the Lagoon Company, unwilling to get drawn into a conflict with the United States. The offer, however, is directed specifically at Rock. Meanwhile, Roberta appears in the city, looking for equipment necessary to wage war.
26	2	"An Office Man's Tactics"	Kunio Katsuki	Kunio Katsuki	Masanori Shino, Masahiro Kimura, Masaki Hinata & Akiko Asaki	September 30, 2010	August 6, 2013
Encouraged by Chang, Rock agrees to help locate Roberta. Dutch, however, strongly urges him to get out of the line of fire should he be unable to find Roberta before her conflict with the United States escalates. After working through the night, pondering, Rock, accompanied by Benny, takes Garcia and Fabiola along for a round of fruitless investigations. Eventually, Benny convinces them to stay at Chang's yacht house, where their unusual appearance will not get in the way. Meanwhile, Roanapur's crime lords meet to discuss the situation, and Roberta accumulates the things she needs with the help of a man named Richie Leroy. Still unable to solve the puzzle, Rock enlists Revy's help, who proves more successful than him at getting the townsfolk to talk, and learns from a crazy person about Roberta's involvement with Richie.
27	3	"Angels in the Crosshairs"	Yasuhisa Katō	Sunao Katabuchi	Masanori Shino, Taiki Imamura, Akiko Asaki & Masaki Hinata (Note: Chie Uratani directed the action sequences)	January 7, 2011	August 6, 2013
Revy mines Richie for information on Roberta's whereabouts, then heads toward her, accompanied by Rock, Garcia and, Fabiola. Finding upon their arrival that open conflict has already ensued between Roberta, units of the US Army, and others, Revy hires reinforcements in the form of Shenhua, Sawyer, and Lotton. After giving Garcia an envelope to be opened when he no longer knows what to do, Rock stays behind, while the others enter the combat zone. Garcia is separated from the group, finds Roberta's empty bottle of stimulants, and follows her. He witnesses her killing several FARC soldiers with bare hands and being beaten and pinned down at gunpoint by another. Instead of following his orders to kill her, the soldier attempts to recruit Roberta back into the FARC. She gives herself swayed by his words and feigns sexual arousal by the situation. The soldier is fooled, and she brutally wounds him with a hidden weapon, professes her devotion to Garcia, and goes down on him with her fists. Garcia, disturbed by the scene, steps into view, asking her to stop. At first, Roberta is shocked by her young master's presence, but quickly decides that he must be another hallucination, and aims a gun at him to prove it.
28	4	"Oversaturation Kill Box"	Kunio Katsuki	Sunao Katabuchi	Masanori Shino, Yasuhisa Katō & Masahiro Kimura	March 11, 2011	August 6, 2013
After Garcia is rescued by a group of American soldiers, Roberta is engaged by and defeats Shenhua, Sawyer, and Lotton with non-lethal force. Confronting her, Fabiola is forced to acknowledge her chief's insanity. Regaining consciousness in the presence of the Americans, Garcia pulls a gun on their commander, Major Shane, who, after learning about Garcia's circumstances, agrees that he has a right to vengeance. Roberta attacks, interrupting the exchange, but is repelled with assistance from Hotel Moscow. Meanwhile, Rock has a meeting with Eda, and calls Dutch to arrange for the Lagoon Company to take the Americans out of town. Dutch hangs up on him, but when Chang calls for the same reason, he is left with little choice, and accepts. Finding their young employer in the hands of the Americans, Revy and Shenhua decide to attack them, but are prevented from doing so by Hotel Moscow. Garcia hands the Americans a map from Rock's envelope. Following it, they head for the coast. En route, they are again attacked by Roberta, and, again, Hotel Moscow intervenes in their favor. With Garcia, Fabiola, the Americans, and the Lagoon Company on board, the Black Lagoon sets sail for the river Mekong, while Eda manipulates Roberta into boarding an air plane with her.
29	5	"Codename Paradise, Status MIA"	Sunao Katabuchi & Chie Uratani	Sunao Katabuchi & Chie Uratani	Masanori Shino, Akiko Asaki, Taiki Imamura & Masaki Hinata	June 22, 2011	August 6, 2013
After conversations between Garcia and Rock, as well as Fabiola and Revy, Garcia decides to follow Rock's plan, and Revy experiences flashbacks of how she was raped by cops in jail. The Black Lagoon arrives at its destination in the Golden Triangle, and the Americans set out to complete their mission. In the jungle, they are attacked by Roberta, using her former employer's antique musket to fire flechettes. She kills several, but is severely wounded and loses two fingers. Garcia, Fabiola, and Major Shane come face to face with Roberta, and Garcia explains that she cannot redeem past sins by taking revenge, then fires blanks at both Shane, who pretends to drop dead, and Roberta, who reflexively fires back, wounding Garcia. The confrontation ends with Garcia kissing Roberta and laying in her arms and Shane ordering his men to stand down. Meanwhile, Rock explains his motives to Revy, and predicts his victory over Chang and future changes to Roanapur. As the wounded are carried onto the Black Lagoon, Fabiola takes her anger out on Rock by raging and firing a blank at him. Several months later, Rock laments that nothing has changed in Roanapur after all, and Roberta, having lost an arm and a leg, and living in Garcia's mansion, meets the family of the victim of hers who had haunted her for so long.

== Home media release ==
Original DVD and Blu-ray Disc release dates
Ep.	Japan		North America		Europe		Australia	
Ep.	DVD	Blu-ray Disc	DVD	Blu-ray Disc	DVD	Blu-ray Disc	DVD	Blu-ray Disc
1	July 26, 2006	December 23, 2009	May 22, 2007	December 4, 2012	March 10, 2008	July 30, 2012	March 19, 2008	—
2	July 26, 2006	December 23, 2009	May 22, 2007	December 4, 2012	March 10, 2008	July 30, 2012	March 19, 2008	—
3	August 30, 2006	December 23, 2009	May 22, 2007	December 4, 2012	March 10, 2008	July 30, 2012	March 19, 2008	—
4	August 30, 2006	December 23, 2009	May 22, 2007	December 4, 2012	March 10, 2008	July 30, 2012	March 19, 2008	—
5	September 27, 2006	December 23, 2009	July 24, 2007	December 4, 2012	May 26, 2008	July 30, 2012	April 23, 2008	—
6	September 27, 2006	December 23, 2009	July 24, 2007	December 4, 2012	May 26, 2008	July 30, 2012	April 23, 2008	—
7	October 25, 2006	December 23, 2009	July 24, 2007	December 4, 2012	May 26, 2008	July 30, 2012	April 23, 2008	—
8	October 25, 2006	February 10, 2010	July 24, 2007	December 4, 2012	May 26, 2008	July 30, 2012	April 23, 2008	—
9	November 29, 2006	February 10, 2010	September 18, 2007	December 4, 2012	July 7, 2008	July 30, 2012	May 21, 2008	—
10	November 29, 2006	February 10, 2010	September 18, 2007	December 4, 2012	July 7, 2008	July 30, 2012	May 21, 2008	—
11	December 27, 2006	February 10, 2010	September 18, 2007	December 4, 2012	July 7, 2008	July 30, 2012	May 21, 2008	—
12	December 27, 2006	February 10, 2010	September 18, 2007	December 4, 2012	July 7, 2008	July 30, 2012	May 21, 2008	—
13	January 31, 2007	February 24, 2010	August 19, 2008	December 4, 2012	September 8, 2008	July 30, 2012	July 23, 2008	—
14	January 31, 2007	February 24, 2010	August 19, 2008	December 4, 2012	September 8, 2008	July 30, 2012	July 23, 2008	—
15	February 28, 2007	February 24, 2010	August 19, 2008	December 4, 2012	September 8, 2008	July 30, 2012	July 23, 2008	—
16	February 28, 2007	February 24, 2010	August 19, 2008	December 4, 2012	September 8, 2008	July 30, 2012	July 23, 2008	—
17	March 28, 2007	February 24, 2010	September 16, 2008	December 4, 2012	November 10, 2008	July 30, 2012	August 20, 2008	—
18	March 28, 2007	February 24, 2010	September 16, 2008	December 4, 2012	November 10, 2008	July 30, 2012	August 20, 2008	—
19	April 25, 2007	March 25, 2010	September 16, 2008	December 4, 2012	November 10, 2008	July 30, 2012	August 20, 2008	—
20	April 25, 2007	March 25, 2010	September 16, 2008	December 4, 2012	November 10, 2008	July 30, 2012	August 20, 2008	—
21	May 30, 2007	March 25, 2010	October 28, 2008	December 4, 2012	January 5, 2009	July 30, 2012	September 17, 2008	—
22	May 30, 2007	March 25, 2010	October 28, 2008	December 4, 2012	January 5, 2009	July 30, 2012	September 17, 2008	—
23	June 27, 2007	March 25, 2010	October 28, 2008	December 4, 2012	January 5, 2009	July 30, 2012	September 17, 2008	—
24	June 27, 2007	March 25, 2010	October 28, 2008	December 4, 2012	January 5, 2009	July 30, 2012	September 17, 2008	—
25	July 17, 2010	July 17, 2010	August 6, 2013	August 6, 2013	December 2, 2013	December 2, 2013	—	—
26	September 30, 2010	September 30, 2010	August 6, 2013	August 6, 2013	December 2, 2013	December 2, 2013	—	—
27	January 7, 2011	January 7, 2011	August 6, 2013	August 6, 2013	December 2, 2013	December 2, 2013	—	—
28	March 11, 2011	March 11, 2011	August 6, 2013	August 6, 2013	December 2, 2013	December 2, 2013	—	—
29	June 22, 2011	June 22, 2011	August 6, 2013	August 6, 2013	December 2, 2013	December 2, 2013	—	—
