= Tsubomi =

Tsubomi (蕾) is Japanese for a flower bud. It may refer to:

== Music ==
- "Tsubomi", by Kobukuro
- "Tsubomi", by Mikuni Shimokawa
- "Tsubomi", by Maria (band)
- "Tsubomi", by GReeeeN
- "Tsubomi", by Omoinotake

== Fictional characters ==
- Tsubomi, a character in the visual novel Shuffle!
- Tsubomi Okuwaka, a character in the light novel series Strawberry Panic!.
- Tsubomi Hanasaki, a character in the anime HeartCatch PreCure!
- Tsubomi Kido, a character in the light novel series Kagerou Project
- Tsubomi is a character in the manga Mission Yozakura Family

== Other ==
- Tsubomi (magazine), a Japanese manga magazine
- Tsubomi, a Japanese adult video actress
- Tsubomi Daikakumei (Great Revolution of Flower Buds), a Japanese idol unit. Old unit name "Tsubomi" until 2019.
- Tsubomi a Japanese-language study application featuring spaced repetition system (SRS) flashcards, kanji drills, and grammar practice.

== See also ==
- Naisho no Tsubomi, (Secret Tsubomi) is a Japanese shōjo manga authored by Yuu Yabuuchi, and published by Shogakukan.
- "Koi no Tsubomi", (Love Bud) Kumi Koda's 31st solo under the Rhythm Zone label
- "Kara no Tsubomi", a maxi single released by the J-pop singer, Mell
