= Brad Swaile =

Canadian voice actor

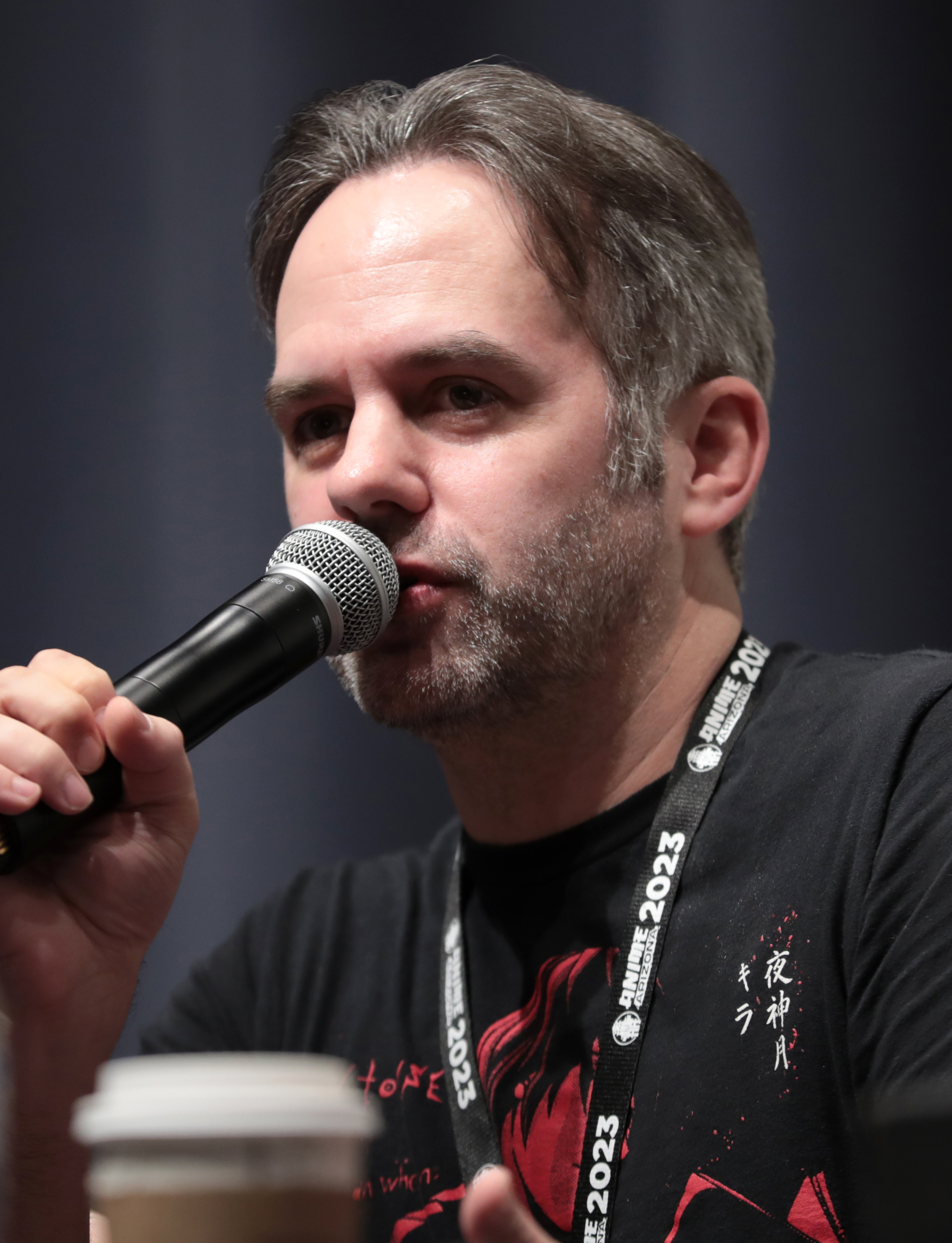
- Swaile in 2023
- Born: Bradley Swaile
- Education: Kwantlen Polytechnic University
- Occupation: Voice actor
- Years active: 1992–present
- Agent: Play Management
- Children: 2

Bradley Swaile is a Canadian voice actor. His major roles include Light Yagami in Death Note, Jun Arashiyama in World Trigger, Rock in Black Lagoon, Kicker Jones in Transformers: Energon, and Nightcrawler in X-Men: Evolution. In the 1990s, he voiced Mousse in Ranma ½ and Teen Gohan in the Ocean dub of Dragon Ball Z. He has also voiced multiple roles in the Mobile Suit Gundam series, including Amuro Ray in Mobile Suit Gundam, Quatre Raberba Winner in Gundam Wing, Dearka Elsman in Gundam SEED, Auel Neider in Gundam SEED Destiny and Setsuna F. Seiei in Gundam 00. In video games, he voices Jin Kazama in Street Fighter X Tekken.

== Biography ==
Swaile attended Sir Winston Churchill Secondary School in Vancouver. He graduated from Kwantlen University with a degree in Graphic and Visual Design.

Swaile has acted in several animated series. One of his earliest anime roles was in the English dub of Ranma ½ where he voiced Mousse. When the Ocean Group dubbed Dragon Ball Z in the mid-1990s, Swaile voiced Adult Gohan. He also voiced Nightcrawler in X-Men: Evolution and Ace in My Little Pony Tales. In the late 2000s, he voiced the lead characters Rock in Black Lagoon and Light Yagami in the hit anime Death Note. He reprised his role for the latter's Death Note live action film dub. As of March 2026, Swaile is also known for his role as Jun Arashiyama in the anime series World Trigger.

Swaile is known for many roles in the Mobile Suit Gundam franchise. These roles include Amuro Ray in Mobile Suit Gundam, Quatre Raberba Winner in Gundam Wing, Dearka Elsman in Gundam SEED, Auel Neider in Gundam SEED Destiny, and Setsuna F. Seiei in Gundam 00.

== Filmography ==
=== Anime ===
List of English dubbing performances in anime
| Year | Title | Role | Notes | Source |
|---|---|---|---|---|
| 1993–2002 | Ranma ½ series | Mousse, Sentaro | Ocean/Viz dub | |
| 1999 | Video Girl Ai | Yota Moteuchi | | |
| 2000 | Mobile Suit Gundam Wing | Quatre Raberba Winner, Zechs Subordinate | | |
| 2000 | Cardcaptors | Various | Ocean/Nelvana dub | |
| 2000 | Dragon Ball Z | Teen Gohan | Ocean/Westwood dub | |
| 2001 | Saber Marionette J | Otaru Mamiya | | |
| 2001 | Gundam Wing: Endless Waltz | Quatre Raberba Winner | | |
| 2001 | Mobile Suit Gundam | Amuro Ray | | |
| 2001 | Zoids: New Century Zero | Harry Champ | | |
| 2002 | The SoulTaker | Kyosuke Date | | |
| 2002 | Hamtaro | Maxwell | | |
| 2002 | Mobile Suit Gundam: Char's Counterattack | Amuro Ray | | |
| 2002 | InuYasha | Amari Nobunaga | | |
| 2002 | Earth Maiden Arjuna | Chris Hawken, others | | |
| 2002–04 | Project ARMS series | Takeshi Tomoe | | |
| 2003 | Meltylancer | Ligel | | |
| 2003–05 | MegaMan NT Warrior | Lan Hikari | Also Axess | |
| 2003 | Junkers Come Here | Keisuke Kimura | | |
| 2003 | Boys Over Flowers | Kazuya Aoike | | |
| 2003 | Zoids: Fuzors | RD | | |
| 2003 | Infinite Ryvius | Kouji Aiba | | |
| 2004 | Transformers: Energon | Kicker Jones | | |
| 2004–05 | Mobile Suit Gundam SEED | Dearka Elsman | Also specials and film | |
| 2004 | Dragon Drive | Reiji Ozora | | |
| 2004 | Nurse Witch Komugi | Kyosuke Date | | |
| 2004 | Dokkoida!? | Suzuo Sakurazaki / Dokkoida | | |
| 2004–06 | Maison Ikkoku | Yusaku Godai | | |
| 2004 | The Daichis | Yashiro, Pokemaru Seller | | |
| 2004 | Galaxy Angel Z | Kato, Fan, Roberto | | |
| 2005 | Tokyo Underground | Rumina Asagi | | |
| 2005 | Hikaru no Go | Fujiwara-no-Sai | | |
| 2006 | Mobile Suit Gundam SEED Destiny | Auel Neider, Dearka Elsman | | |
| 2006 | Shakugan no Shana | Keisaku Satou | Season 1 | |
| 2006 | .hack//Roots | Seisaku | | |
| 2007–08 | Black Lagoon series | Rokuro Okajima / Rock | | |
| 2007 | The Story of Saiunkoku | Ryuki Shi | | |
| 2007–08 | Death Note series | Light Yagami | Also anime films and specials | |
| 2008–09 | Mobile Suit Gundam 00 series | Setsuna F. Seiei | | |
| 2012 | Kurozuka | Kuro | | |
| 2013 | Black Lagoon: Roberta's Blood Trail | Rokuro Okajima/Rock | | |
| 2016 | Kingdom series | Ci Zou, Ping Wei, Yuan, Ri Boku | | |
| 2017 | Beyblade Burst Evolution | Ghasem Madal | | |
| 2017–22 | World Trigger | Jun Arashiyama, Ko Murakami | | |
| 2017 | Gintama | Saito Shimaru | | |
| 2019 | Tobot Athlon | Athlon Rocky | | |
| 2021 | Hello Carbot | Pron | | |

=== Animation ===
List of voice performances in animation
| Year | Title | Role | Notes | Source |
|---|---|---|---|---|
| 2000–03 | X-Men: Evolution | Kurt Wagner / Nightcrawler | | |
| 2010 | Dreamkix | Morrie, Peter, Garrick | | |
| 2012 | Hero 108 | Yu Tang | | |
| 2017 | Barbie Video Game Hero | Kris | | |

=== Film ===
List of voice performances in films
| Year | Title | Role | Notes | Source |
|---|---|---|---|---|
| 2009 | Barbie and the Three Musketeers | Serge, Handsome Man | Direct-to-video | |
| 2016 | Ratchet & Clank | Ollie / Super Fan | | |

=== Live-Action ===
Live Action English Dubbing
| Year | Title | Role | Notes | Source |
|---|---|---|---|---|
| 2006 | Death Note | Light Yagami | | |
| 2006 | Death Note 2: The Last Name | Light Yagami | | |

=== Video games ===
List of English dubbing performances in video games
| Year | Title | Role | Notes | Source |
|---|---|---|---|---|
| 2001 | Mobile Suit Gundam: Journey to Jaburo | Amuro Ray | | |
| 2002 | Gundam: Battle Assault 2 | Amuro Ray, Quatre Rebera Winner | | |
| 2003 | Mobile Suit Gundam: Encounters in Space | Amuro Ray | | |
| 2005 | Mobile Suit Gundam: Gundam vs. Zeta Gundam | Amuro Ray (0079) | Archive footage | |
| 2007 | Dynasty Warriors: Gundam | Amuro Ray | | |
| 2009 | Dynasty Warriors: Gundam 2 | Amuro Ray | | |
| 2010–11 | Dead Rising 2 | Brent Ernst, others | Also Off the Record | |
| 2011 | Dynasty Warriors: Gundam 3 | Setsuna F. Seiei, Amuro Ray | | |
| 2012 | Street Fighter X Tekken | Jin Kazama | | |
| 2019 | Langrisser Mobile | Elwin | | |
| 2022 | New Tales from the Borderlands | Sponsor-Bot | | |
| 2023 | Resident Evil 4 | Soldier A | Separate Ways DLC | |
