= Kara no Tsubomi =

Single by Mell
- B-side: "Utsukushiku Ikitai: I've in Budokan 2009 Live Ver."
- Released: July 29, 2009
- Genre: J-Pop
- Length: 17:38
- Label: Geneon
- Songwriter(s): Mell, C.G mix
- Producer(s): I've Sound

Mell singles chronology
"'RIDEBACK'" (2009)	"Kara no Tsubomi" (2009)

Kara no Tsubomi (殻の蕾) is a maxi single released by the J-pop singer, Mell. This was scheduled to be released on July 29, 2009. This single has also been contained in the I've Sound 10th Anniversary 「Departed to the future」 Special CD BOX which was released on March 25, 2009.

The coupling song Utsukushiku Ikitai: I've in Budokan 2009 Live Ver. is the live version of her first visual novel theme song with I've Sound that she performed in their concert in Budokan last January 2, 2009.

The single will only come in a limited CD+DVD edition (GNCV-0020). The DVD will contain the Promotional Video for Kara no Tsubomi.

== Track listing ==
1. Kara no Tsubomi (殻の蕾)—6:01
  Lyrics: Mell
  Composition: C.G mix
  Arrangement: C.G mix, Takeshi Hoshino
2. Utsukushii Ikitai: I've in Budokan 2009 Live Ver. -- 5:37
  Lyrics/Composition/Arrangement: Kazuya Takase
3. Kara no Tsubomi (instrumental) (殻の蕾)—6:00

== I've Sound 10th Anniversary 「Departed to the future」 Special CD BOX sales trajectory ==
Mon	Tue	Wed	Thu	Fri	Sat	Sun	Week Rank	Sales	Total Sales
--	21	--	--	--	--	--	43	3,838	3,838
--	--	--	--	--	--	--	290	501	4,339

== Sales trajectory ==
Mon	Tue	Wed	Thu	Fri	Sat	Sun	Week Rank	Sales	Total Sales
-	-	-	-	-	-	-	153	429	429
