= Dean Redman =

British born Canadian actor

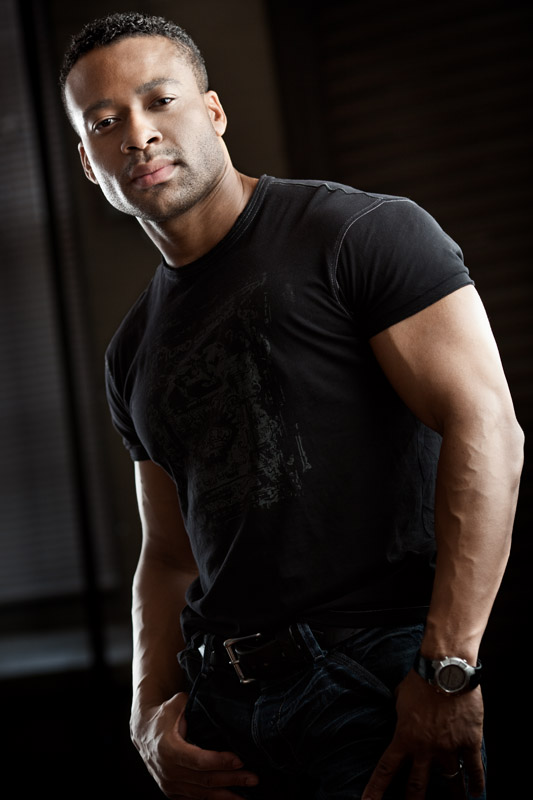
- Official picture of Dean Redman
- Occupations: Actor, voice actor, stunt person

Dean Redman is a British-born Canadian actor.

== Career ==
He is known for his work on War for the Planet of the Apes (2017) and appeared in two roles, playing the characters Varis and Caged Frost Wolf in the live action film, Warcraft (2016). He also appeared in The X Files and Second Chance.

He is also a voice actor, working with some of Vancouver's leading voice studios, including Ocean Studios, Sound Kitchen Studios, KOKO Productions, and New Machine Studios among many others. In his voice acting debut, he lent his voice to the character Dutch, an ex-marine who leads the Lagoon company in Black Lagoon. He has also been the voice of Nick Fury for many Marvel Productions appearances of the character since 2009.

In his interview in the Behind the Scenes production clip of the Black Lagoon Volume 1 Limited Edition Extras Disc, it is revealed that he is a former commercial pilot.

== Filmography ==
=== Film ===
| Year | Title | Role | Notes |
|---|---|---|---|
| 2002 | The Black Prayer | Black | Short film |
| 2005 | Alone in the Dark | Agent Richards | |
| 2005 | The Hard Corps | Drive By Passenger | Direct-to-video |
| 2006 | Hollow Man 2 | Police Guard | Direct-to-video |
| 2007 | White Noise: The Light | Security Guard | |
| 2007 | When a Man Falls in the Forest | Security Guard | |
| 2008 | Good People, Bad Days | Danny | Direct-to-video |
| 2008 | The Art of War II: Betrayal | Team Leader | Direct-to-video |
| 2008 | The Day the Earth Stood Still | Military Policeman | |
| 2009 | Not Another Damn Musical | Officer Hudson | Short film |
| 2009 | 2012 | Vegas Fireman | |
| 2010 | Percy Jackson & the Olympians: The Lightning Thief | Nashville Cop #1 | Uncredited |
| 2012 | Maximum Conviction | Jones | |
| 2016 | Warcraft | Varis/Caged Frost Wolf | |
| 2018 | Freaks | ADF Captain | |

=== Television ===
| Year | Title | Roles | Notes |
|---|---|---|---|
| 2002–05 | Stargate SG-1 | SF Guard, Firefighter, Tagrean Soldier, Lt. Woeste | 10 episodes |
| 2003 | Jake 2.0 | NSA Guard, Guard | 2 episodes |
| 2003 | Stealing Christmas | Store Guard | Television film |
| 2004 | Fatal Lessons: The Good Teacher | Policeman | Television film |
| 2004 | Da Vinci's Inquest | Eddie | Episode: "You Promised Me a Celebrity" |
| 2005–08; 2010 | Smallville | Police Officer, Policeman, Lab Guard | 5 episodes |
| 2006 | Da Vinci's City Hall | Police Constable #1 | Episode: "Gotta Press the Flesh" |
| 2006 | Lesser Evil | Hawthorne | Television film |
| 2006 | Dark Storm | MP #1 | Television film |
| 2006 | Blade: The Series | Armed Familiar | Episode: "Death Goes On" |
| 2006 | Veiled Truth | Pawn shop clerk | Television film |
| 2006 | The Dead Zone | Vet | Episode: "Vortex" |
| 2006 | Noah's Arc | Clayton | 3 episodes |
| 2006 | Final Days of Planet Earth | EMT | 2 episodes |
| 2007 | Blood Ties | Vincent | Episode: "Bad JuJu" |
| 2007 | Black Lagoon | Dutch (voice) | |
| 2007 | The 4400 | Private Jones | Episode: "The Wrath of Graham" |
| 2007 | Masters of Science Fiction | Bradley Tanner | Episode: "Watchbird" |
| 2008 | Trail by Fire | Norris | Television film |
| 2009 | Impact | War Room Tech #1 | 2 episodes |
| 2009 | Polar Storm | Sergeant | Television film |
| 2009 | Storm Seekers | Cop | Television film |
| 2009–12 | Iron Man: Armored Adventures | Nick Fury (voice) | 12 episodes |
| 2009 | Sanctuary | Goon killed by Duke | Episode: "Penance" |
| 2018–19 | Super Dinosaur | General Casey (voice) | 19 episodes |
| 2020 | Ninjago | Unagami (voice) | 10 episodes |
| 2023–24 | Superman & Lois | Warden William Ellis | 2 episodes |
