= List of Black Lagoon characters =

Main characters from the series, the Lagoon Company (from left to right): Benny, Rock, Revy, and Dutch

The Black Lagoon manga series feature a cast of characters created by Rei Hiroe

== The Lagoon Company ==
The Lagoon Company (ラグーン商会, Ragūn Shōkai) operates as a mercenary and pirate organization based in Roanapur, specializing in maritime smuggling and retrieval operations for the city's criminal underworld.

=== Rokuro Okajima / Rock ===
Voiced by: Daisuke Namikawa (Japanese); Brad Swaile (English)

Rokuro Okajima (岡島緑郎, Okajima Rokurō), known as Rock (ロック, Rokku), begins as a 25-year-old Japanese salaryman working for Asahi Industries in Tokyo. In 1994, during a smuggling operation where he unknowingly transports sensitive documents, he is taken hostage by the Black Lagoon crew. When his company abandons him, declaring him dead to cover up the operation, he joins the Lagoon Company as their negotiator and accountant. Despite his civilian background, he adapts to the criminal underworld of Roanapur while maintaining his business attire and preferring diplomacy over violence.

Rock demonstrates proficiency in multiple languages including English, Spanish, Romanian, and Russian, along with geological knowledge from his corporate career. His intelligence and charisma earn him respect from various Roanapur figures, though his moral compass frequently clashes with the city's ruthless environment. Over time, he develops a more pragmatic approach, orchestrating complex schemes during the Roberta incident that reveal his growing understanding of criminal dynamics. However, he retains his fundamental humanity, as shown when he risks his safety to protect Feng Yifei without personal gain.

His family in Tokyo maintains minimal contact with him, their relationship strained after his academic failures and subsequent disappearance.

=== Revy ===
Voiced by: Megumi Toyoguchi (Japanese); Maryke Hendrikse (English)

Revy (レヴィ, Revi), also known by her real name Rebecca Lee, serves as the primary combatant for the Lagoon Company. Born in Chinatown, Manhattan, near Mott Street, she is a Chinese American with a criminal past. Flashbacks suggest she developed her firearms proficiency through informal practice, including shooting at cans, and may have killed her abusive father as a teenager. The CIA notes she remains infamous with the NYPD, particularly the fictional 27th Precinct.

Revy is aggressive, foul-mouthed, and emotionally volatile, favoring violence over diplomacy. Despite her hardened demeanor, she is highly ticklish and indulges heavily in smoking and drinking. Her relationship with Rock begins with hostility—she once nearly kills him during an argument—but she later becomes fiercely protective of him, saving his life multiple times. Eda's teasing implies romantic tension, particularly when Revy deflects questions about her feelings rather than outright denying them.

A supremely skilled fighter, Revy's marksmanship and reflexes border on superhuman, with few rivals such as Roberta and Ginji. She acknowledges Mr. Chang's superior skill but aspires to match it. Her preferred weapons are a pair of modified Beretta 92FS pistols, featuring extended barrels, suppressor compatibility, and engravings including a Jolly Roger and Thai inscriptions. Ambidextrous, she earns the nickname "Two Hand" [sic] in Roanapur, a reference to Douglas E. Winter's novel Run. She also demonstrates proficiency with rifles and grenade launchers. Shaped by a traumatic past, Revy adopts a nihilistic worldview, relying solely on her own strength and resources.

=== Dutch ===
Voiced by: Tsutomu Isobe (Japanese); Dean Redman (English)

Dutch (ダッチ, Datchi) is the African American leader of the Lagoon Company and captain of the Black Lagoon, a former U.S. Navy PT boat. A veteran of the Vietnam War, he served in the Marines before going AWOL near the war's end and relocating to Thailand as a mercenary.

Dutch initially opposes Revy's impulsive decision to take Rock hostage but later permits him to join the Lagoon Company after recognizing his usefulness. Preferring negotiation and strategy over direct combat, Dutch handles contracts with Roanapur's criminal factions while rarely engaging in violence himself. Despite this, he remains a capable fighter, proficient with shotguns and revolvers. His demeanor is generally calm and courteous, though his past raises questions—some doubt his claimed military history, and a fellow soldier warns that Dutch's deceptions likely conceal significant motives.

Physically imposing, Dutch wears sunglasses, camouflage pants, and a flak jacket. His exact age is unclear, though his Vietnam service suggests he is in his 40s or 50s. He shares a mutual respect with Balalaika of Hotel Moscow, having once saved her life. A later storyline involving French assassins hints at unresolved elements of his past.

=== Benny ===
Voiced by: Hiroaki Hirata (Japanese); Brian Drummond (English)

Benny (ベニー, Benī) is a University of Florida dropout who joined the Lagoon Company after Revy and Dutch saved him from both the FBI and the mafia. Serving as the group's mechanic, computer specialist, and researcher, he also operates their vehicles. During the first season, he drives the group's 1968 Plymouth Roadrunner, which was then replaced by a 1965 Pontiac GTO.

Of Jewish descent, Benny maintains a calm demeanor and openly acknowledges his lack of combat skills compared to his crewmates. While he accepts the violent methods employed by Revy and Dutch, he remains protective of his computer equipment. His technical expertise eventually leads to a relationship with Greenback Jane, who returns to Roanapur after the Lovelace Incident.

== Hotel Moscow ==
Hotel Moscow (ホテル・モスクワ, Hoteru Mosukuwa) is a Russian mafia faction operating in Thailand, named after Moscow's historic Hotel Moskva. Using the Bougainvillea Trade Company as a front, the group consists of former Soviet–Afghan War veterans fiercely loyal to Balalaika. Though recent arrivals in Roanapur, their military discipline and extreme violence quickly establish their fearsome reputation among the city's criminal elements.

=== Balalaika ===
Voiced by: Mami Koyama (Japanese); Patricia Drake (English)

Balalaika (バラライカ, Bararaika) commands the Russian mafia group Hotel Moscow. Born Sofiya Pavlovna Irinovskaya, she served as a Soviet Army captain and VDV paratrooper during the Soviet–Afghan War, earning her callsign from Soviet troops' slang for the Dragunov sniper rifle. After the USSR's collapse, she established Hotel Moscow in 1992 with fellow Afghan War veterans. Recognizable by her cigar smoking and extensive burn scars (earning her the epithet "Fry-Face"), Balalaika maintains disciplined control over her organization. She employs former Soviet special forces operatives (Vysotoniki) who operate from the cargo ship Maria Zeleska. Despite being on Interpol's watchlist, she travels internationally using diplomatic credentials under the alias Vladilena N. Vasilinov. Balalaika demonstrates mutual professional respect with Roanapur's criminal elements, particularly valuing Rock's strategic insights and maintaining a working relationship with Lagoon Company after Dutch saved her life. Her combat experience and tactical acumen make her both a feared adversary and respected leader in Roanapur's underworld.

=== Boris ===
Voiced by: Taiten Kusunoki (Japanese); Mark Acheson (English)

Boris (ボリス, Borisu) serves as Balalaika's second-in-command in Hotel Moscow. A veteran of the Soviet–Afghan War, he bears a distinctive scar across his face from forehead to cheek. Balalaika addresses him as "Comrade Sergeant", indicating their previous military relationship where he likely served as her platoon sergeant. Despite his imposing physique, Boris maintains a calm demeanor marked by his deep Russian accent. He demonstrates unwavering loyalty to Balalaika and frequently expresses concern when she participates directly in combat operations.

== The Hong Kong Triad ==
The Hong Kong Triad are a branch of the Hong Kong-based Triad stationed in Roanapur. They are led by Mr. Chang, who is a proficient gun fighter in his own right. Chang is more patient than Balalaika in terms of getting into battle. Under his services are Shenhua, who is his top assassin; Sawyer, who does disposal jobs for him frequently despite not being a member of the organization, and Leigharch, who is their getaway driver until recent events prevented him from acting in this capacity.

=== Mr. Chang ===
Voiced by: Toshiyuki Morikawa (Japanese); Trevor Devall (English)

Chang Wai-san (張維新, Chan Waisan), also known by his rank as Pak Tsz Sin (白紙扇), leads the Thailand branch of the Sun Yee On Triad. He is a former officer of the Royal Hong Kong Police Force, who betrayed his colleagues in a mission and left them to die at a Star Ferry pier. He maintains Roanapur's criminal equilibrium through strategic cooperation between factions, recognizing that outside interference would destabilize all organizations. His approach reflects pragmatic understanding of power dynamics rather than idealism. Chang demonstrates exceptional combat skills, particularly with handguns. His proficiency surpasses even Revy's abilities, earning him her reluctant respect. This technical mastery likely stems from his background in law enforcement, a fact he reveals when confronted about his criminal activities. Despite his violent profession, Chang maintains an unusually relaxed demeanor, showing amusement at unconventional strategies and ironic situations.

The triad leader shares a complex relationship with Balalaika of Hotel Moscow. Though mutually respectful, they deliberately avoid formal alliances to preserve professional challenges. Chang's operations receive covert CIA support through an arrangement that tolerates his criminal activities in exchange for maintaining regional stability. This arrangement becomes apparent during communications with Eda, though Chang resents the implicit American control. Chang survives numerous combat encounters through skill and composure, including direct confrontations with Balalaika and Roberta. His tactical abilities often go unnoticed due to his calm personality, contrasting sharply with more volatile figures in Roanapur's underworld.

Chang's character draws inspiration from Chow Yun-fat's triad roles in John Woo films, particularly resembling Mark Lee from A Better Tomorrow (1986) in both his Triad affiliation and distinctive dual-pistol combat style.

=== Shenhua ===
Voiced by: Yūko Sasaki (Japanese); Saffron Henderson (English)

Shenhua (シェンホア, Shenhoa) is a Taiwanese assassin working for Mr. Chang's triad organization. Specializing in close-quarters combat, she employs various bladed weapons, including modified kukri knives connected by leather ropes. Her fighting style incorporates throwing knives and rope dart techniques. Shenhua maintains a professional rivalry with Revy, exchanging derogatory nicknames during their encounters. She practices Taoism despite occasionally claiming atheism, a contradiction stemming from translation discrepancies. Her speech patterns mix Chinese and English in broken phrases.

After sustaining severe injuries during the Greenback Jane operation, Shenhua recovers and later assists Garcia Lovelace against Colombian cartel forces targeting Roberta. This confrontation marks the first instance where she displays fear in combat. She frequently partners with Sawyer for disposal operations, though unlike her associate, she exclusively uses bladed weapons rather than engaging in unarmed combat.

=== Leigharch ===
Voiced by: Akimasa Ohmori (Japanese); Trevor Devall (English)

Leigharch (レガーチ, Regāchi) is an Irish getaway driver who worked with Shenhua during the incident involving the Islamic Liberation Front. A compulsive user of marijuana, he has a distressingly frequent tendency to hallucinate at inopportune times, such as in the middle of a car chase. Most of his hallucinations are actually references to Western pop culture, such as Playmates, Star Trek characters like Jean-Luc Picard and Klingons, or 1960s rock music such as Jimi Hendrix. Leigharch is said by Shenhua during the Greenback Jane incident to have suffered a massive overdose (he "couldn't get back from Mars"), inducing psychological damage severe enough to commit him to full-time medical attention. Despite his drug addiction and hallucinations, he was still considered a skilled driver before his overdose. His vehicle of choice was a 1988 Jeep Cherokee.

== The Colombian Cartel ==
The Colombian cartel noted in this section is separate from the Manisalera Cartel which was originally responsible for Garcia Lovelace's kidnapping and was subsequently wiped out by Roberta and Balalaika who seems to have since taken over their territory. Along with the Italian Mafia, they are the most brash of the criminal organizations, much to the disgust of Balalaika and Chang. Just them barely appearing often results in needless fighting and bloodshed. They are led by Abrego, who is somewhat of a coward and usually travels with his men. Lately, they have been made a fool of in the criminal underworld because of the Lovelace Family and their two killer maids. While the Italians do it for profit, the Cartels do it as a sense of pride, which usually gets them into unwanted trouble. It is revealed that they had a hand in the assassination of Diego Lovelace.

=== Abrego ===
Voiced by: Hisao Egawa (Japanese); Eli Gabay (English)

Abrego (アブレーゴ, Aburēgo) is a Colombian drug cartel boss operating in Roanapur. Whilst very arrogant, he has a tendency to be cowardly. He was presumed dead after the South American maid Roberta detonated a bomb in the bar he was in, although his appearance in later episodes is evidence that he somehow survived. After the explosion and the loss of many of his gunmen, Abrego's influence in Roanapur seems to have fallen, judging from the attitude he takes from Balalaika, Chang and Verrocchio. He is once again made a fool of, this time by Fabiola.

Ever since the incident with Roberta, the Cartel had tried numerous times to figure out where she was hiding; fortunately for Roberta, through her connection with the Lovelace family, Roberta was protected daily by local police and military forces. Thus, the Cartel couldn't even touch her without causing an incident. Currently, he sends for many FARC soldiers to assist the cartel in finding Roberta; however, much of the FARC has been suspicious of the cartel's action and even threatened to betray them.

=== Gustavo ===
Voiced by: Paul Dobson (English)

Gustavo (グスターボ, Gusutābo) is one of Abrego's main henchmen. At first, he is seen doing simple tasks for Abrego, such as disposal jobs, early in the series. Recently, he's been assigned to track down Roberta after hearing rumors of her returning to the city by other groups, including the police, Triad, and Hotel Moscow. He, along with some men, search for Roberta throughout the city and meets up with Revy and Rock. He then explains the situation within the Cartel regarding Roberta. He then crosses paths with Fabiola, who is requesting the aid of Lagoon Company. Fabiola is threatened by him and his men, as Revy then instigates a fight between them, resulting in a comical argument between him and Bao over the use of the telephone, much to Revy's amusement. In desperation, he tries to call Abrego, who is out with a girl according to his subordinates. He calls all of them in to warn them of another maid who is as fierce as Roberta. Finally, he orders the total destruction of the Yellow Flag, much to Bao's anger as the Yellow Flag is demolished again. He is left behind by his men after Fabiola scares them off. Because of his failure, Abrego has ordered him to be killed on sight. He is later seen at Abrego's side during a meeting with the other gangs, perhaps Abrego becomes aware with heavy losses he caused.

== Other Roanapur gangsters ==
=== Verrocchio ===
Voiced by: Banjo Ginga (Japanese); Scott McNeil (English)

Verrocchio (ヴェロッキオ, Verokkio) is the boss of a branch of the Italian mafia based in Thailand. He is belligerent, impatient, and spiteful, yelling at and beating up his men if dare they speak out and calling Balalaika "Fry-Face" in front of her during the meeting between the gangs. He once attempted to use the child assassins, Hänsel and Gretel, to kill the rival gang leaders, including Balalaika and Mr. Chang, in an attempt to seize complete leadership of Roanapur's criminal underworld. Verrocchio was killed when Hänsel and Gretel turned against him on a murderous whim.

=== Ronny the Jaws ===
Voiced by: Tetsuya Kakihara (Japanese); Paul Dobson (English)

Ronny the Jaws (ロニー・ザ・ジョーズ, Ronī za Jōzu) succeeds Verrocchio as leader of Roanapur's Italian mafia faction. His distinctive dental braces inspire his nickname, while his true identity remains concealed until later events. Balalaika refers to him with the derogatory term "Dago", reflecting their contentious relationship. While demonstrating marginally more restraint than his predecessor, Ronny maintains an arrogant demeanor that draws criticism from established crime figures like Balalaika and Chang. His immature approach to criminal operations earns him little respect within Roanapur's power structure, including from veteran Abrego. The Lagoon Company's Revy notes his organization's brutality approaches Hotel Moscow's level of violence. Ronny establishes cooperative ties with the Albanian mafia to strengthen his position.

=== Chen ===
Voiced by: Suetsu Tokaichi (Japanese); Louis Chirillo (English)

Chen (陳, Chin) was a Chinese crime boss whose business suffered as a result of Hotel Moscow recently muscling into Roanapur. He is quite cowardly, and Dutch had already stopped taking him seriously after he pulled out of a previous contract he had made with the Lagoon Company. After unsuccessfully trying to intimidate Dutch into ending his contracts with Hotel Moscow, he has a proxy hire Lagoon Company for a job and then sends the pirate gang of Luak to ambush them, but Revy and Dutch wipe out the entire fleet. Chen, having bragged about his plan to most of Roanapur, is then located by Hotel Moscow and murdered; they tie him to a chair in his apartment and blow it up using plastic explosives and gasoline.

=== Luak ===
Voiced by: Naoya Uchida (Japanese); Alistair Abell (English)

Luak (ルアク, Ruaku) is the captain of a Vietnamese pirate gang that operated in the rivers and seas of Thailand, mostly composed by former Việt Cộng defectors. He was contracted by Chen to kill off the Lagoon Company when Dutch wouldn't accept Chen over Balalaika. Luak's gang ambushed the Black Lagoon, but the entire gang was wiped out by Revy and Dutch. Revy is seen to fire a round from an M79 grenade launcher into his boat at the end of the fight destroying it, so he is presumed dead.

== The Church of Violence/The Rip-Off Church ==
The Church of Violence is a drug and weapon smuggling operation located in Roanapur. The church is notorious for its double dealings. Using their front as a Christian church, their main business is illegal imports, mainly firearms. However, they are known to import other items, including drugs, which seems to offend Balalaika as it is bad for their business. So far they have consistently outsmarted Hotel Moscow in terms of imports. Dutch refers them as "The Rip-Off Church" due to the group charging heavily for goods, especially those needed for missions. Rock has been able to arrange proper business deals with the Church. The Church is always money-hungry and is known to do double-dealings, much to the disgust of Revy.

=== Eda ===
Voiced by: Jun Karasawa (Japanese); Lisa Ann Beley (English)

Eda (エダ) operates as a nun at the Rip-Off Church, which functions primarily as a smuggling front. Her true allegiance lies with the Central Intelligence Agency (CIA), though she maintains her cover through the church in exchange for financial compensation. She develops casual friendships with Revy and Rock, frequently drinking with the former while teasing the latter with romantic overtures and the nickname "Romeo". Eda possesses distinctive blond hair, blue eyes, and wears pink sunglasses even with her religious habit. She alternates between chewing gum and smoking. Her background suggests origins in Langley, Virginia, though this likely references her CIA affiliation rather than personal history.

As a CIA operative, Eda receives assignments to monitor threats to American interests, including the pursuit of Grey Fox. She manipulates local figures like Mr. Chang through anonymous communications, demonstrating her agency's superior position while provoking his frustration. Among Roanapur's residents, only Rock suspects her true employer. Eda demonstrates proficiency with handguns, though Revy considers her skills inferior.

Her activities prior to arriving in Roanapur receive further exploration in her spin-off series Eda: Initial Stage.

=== Yolanda ===
Voiced by: Akiko Takeguchi (Japanese); Shirley Millner (English)

Yolanda (ヨランダ, Yoranda) leads the Rip-Off Church organization. An elderly woman wearing an eyepatch, she maintains strict control over her operations while presenting a composed demeanor. Though typically delegating combat tasks to subordinates like Eda and Rico, she demonstrates proficiency with a modified handgun when necessary, handling the weapon with unexpected ease and precision. Yolanda maintains extensive intelligence networks with Roanapur's criminal factions. While not formally affiliated with the CIA, she functions as an informant for Eda, providing strategic warnings about potential threats. She exhibits particular disapproval of alcohol consumption within church premises, preferring tea instead. Following negotiations with Rock, Yolanda recognizes his unique capabilities and acknowledges Dutch's judgment in recruiting him. She refers to Revy by her given name "Rebecca" and suggests she could benefit from Rock's perspective. Yolanda's leadership combines religious imagery with pragmatic criminal enterprise, overseeing her organization with disciplined authority.

=== Rico ===
Voiced by: Tetsuya Kakihara (Japanese); Simon Hill (English)

Rico (リカルド, Rikarudo) (Ricardo) is an apprentice priest in the Rip-Off Church. Like Eda and Yolanda, he is a highly skilled gunman whose choice of weapon is a M60 machine gun. He refers to Eda as "Big sis" ("Ane-san" in Japanese) instead of "Sister", much to her chagrin.

== Citizens of Roanapur ==
=== Bao ===
Voiced by: Shirō Saitō (Japanese); Alec Willows (English)

Bao (バオ) owns and operates the Yellow Flag bar in Roanapur, named after the former flag of South Vietnam. A veteran of the Army of the Republic of Vietnam, he served during the Vietnam War. His establishment frequently suffers damage during altercations involving Lagoon Company, particularly from Revy's actions, though she consistently avoids paying for repairs. Hotel Moscow appears to cover these costs, suggesting their financial interest in the business.

The bar serves as a popular gathering place for local criminals and mercenaries, providing networking opportunities alongside drinks. Bao maintains contact with various factions, including informing Lagoon Company about Roberta's return to Roanapur. During one encounter, Revy provokes a fight between Fabiola and Gustavo that results in yet another destruction of his establishment. Bao notes his bar has been damaged over fifteen times and completely destroyed six times since its opening in 1978, with Revy responsible for most incidents.

=== Rowan "Jackpot" Pigeon ===
Voiced by: Masaki Aizawa (Japanese); Adrian Holmes (English)

Rowan "Jackpot" Pigeon (ローワン, Rōwan) is an African-American businessman who owns and operates the GoofFest strip club on Rachiada Street in Roanapur. His establishment specializes in adult entertainment, including BDSM performances. He previously employed Revy as a performer, though she later expresses disinterest in such work.

In addition to managing the club, Pigeon deals in both legal and illicit films, including pornography and snuff films. He maintains a cautious relationship with local criminal organizations, particularly displaying fear of Hotel Moscow and its leader Balalaika.

=== Chief Watsup ===
Voiced by: Masaaki Tsukada (Japanese); Dale Wilson (English)

Chief Watsup (ワトサップ, Watosappu) serves as head of Roanapur's police force. He maintains an arrangement with the city's criminal organizations, including Lagoon Company, receiving regular payments in exchange for ignoring their illegal operations. This understanding requires criminal elements to avoid causing public disturbances. Watsup frequently intervenes in incidents involving Revy, who regularly violates these terms through public altercations. Despite initial reluctance, he develops a grudging tolerance for her behavior through repeated interactions. His relationship with Balalaika of Hotel Moscow remains contentious, though the reasons for her animosity remain unspecified. The chief consistently enforces the established non-interference agreement as long as criminal activities remain discreet.

== Bounty hunters and mercenaries ==
=== The Captain ===
Voiced by: Masahiko Tanaka (Japanese); Paul Dobson (English)

The Captain is the rank of an unknown mercenary in the employ of the Extra Order Company, a fictional private military company similar to modern day Blackwater Worldwide and the now defunct Executive Outcomes, where the initials EO come from. An experienced ex-soldier who saw action in the Liberian civil war in the early 1990s, Captain had no qualms with killing anyone he was asked to kill. He was also something of a challenge-seeker, since he wanted to prolong his fight with the Lagoon Company, whom he saw as worthy opponents. This proved to be his undoing however, since Rock realized this and came up with a strategy to exploit Captain's attitude. While attacking the Black Lagoon head-on in a Mil Mi-24, the boat launched itself off a sunken ship and fired two torpedoes that brought down the Captain's helicopter, one hitting him in the face before detonating.

=== Sawyer the Cleaner ===
Voiced by: Asami Yaguchi (Japanese); Saffron Henderson (English)

Frederica Sawyer (ソーヤー, Sōyā), known professionally as Sawyer the Cleaner, operates as a body disposal specialist and occasional bounty hunter in Roanapur. The local Triad organizations frequently employ her to conduct particularly brutal executions as warnings to their enemies. She maintains a legitimate front through a meat packing business called "U.G. Pork." Sawyer performs her work in a white-tiled room stained with blood from previous operations. She typically wears surgical attire while working, contrasting with her usual gothic fashion when not on duty. A throat injury requires her to use an Ultravoice device for speech, and she becomes severely distressed when unable to use it. Her primary tool is an oversized chainsaw, which she wields with enough precision to deflect gunfire.

Despite her violent profession, she maintains an oddly cheerful disposition, often providing excessively graphic descriptions of her work that disturb listeners. She survives multiple dangerous encounters in Roanapur, including the Jane manhunt and a confrontation with Roberta that leaves her visibly shaken.

Sawyer occasionally performs hotel cleaning services in addition to her disposal work. When without her Ultravoice, she communicates through drawings on surfaces or people's bodies. Her matter-of-fact attitude about gruesome subjects contrasts sharply with others' reactions, as demonstrated when she happily describes corpse-contaminated bedding while her audience becomes physically ill.

=== Claude "Torch" Weaver ===
Voiced by: Youichi Nishijima (Japanese); Jason Simpson (English)

Claude "Torch" Weaver (クロード・"トーチ"・ウィーバー, Kurōdo "Tōchi" Wībā) is an assassin known for his cheerful demeanor and unusual restraint from profanity. The heavyset, bespectacled operative employs compact and full-sized flamethrowers in his work, having previously killed his wife through immolation. Despite his violent profession, he maintains religious convictions and abstains from alcohol.

Weaver participates in the coordinated attack against Revy, Rock, and Eda during the Greenback Jane incident. After isolating his targets in a warehouse, he attempts to burn them alive, only for them to escape. The pursuit continues to the Black Lagoon, where Weaver engages Revy directly before being thrown overboard and subsequently blown up.

=== Lotton the Wizard ===
Voiced by: Tomokazu Sugita (Japanese); Samuel Vincent (English)

Lotton the Wizard (ロットン・"ザ・ウィザード", Rotton "Za Wizādo") is a bounty hunter known for his distinctive appearance, featuring silver hair, shaded glasses, and a black trenchcoat. His primary weapon is a modified pistol resembling a Mauser C96 with an extended magazine. Lotton avoids alcohol consumption, claiming an allergy. Participating in the hunt for Greenback Jane, Lotton survives multiple dangerous encounters despite his questionable combat skills. He withstands a gunshot wound from Revy and a subsequent fall from a warehouse, protected by body armor. Later, he assists Garcia Lovelace against Colombian cartel forces targeting Roberta, working alongside Sawyer and Shenhua.

Lotton demonstrates unexpected compassion by aiding wounded companions after the maritime battle. Shenhua observes his non-violent disposition, suggesting he would be better suited as a bordello host than a killer. He maintains casual relationships with other bounty hunters, occasionally engaging in recreational activities like video games. Revy dismisses his combat abilities, comparing him more to a gigolo than a professional gunman.

=== Major Shane Caxton ===
Voiced by: Shinji Ogawa (Japanese); Ron Halder (English)

Major Shane Caxton (キャクストン, Kyakusuton) commands Gray Fox, a black-ops unit operating under NSA authority. A Vietnam War veteran like Dutch, he maintains strict military ethics during covert operations in Southeast Asia. A year after his team assassinates Diego Lovelace, he is deployed to Roanapur to capture a Golden Triangle drug trafficker linked to Khun Sa. Caxton's presence triggers city-wide conflict when Roberta tracks his unit for revenge. The operation draws involvement from Roanapur's major factions, including Hotel Moscow and the Triads. He demonstrates moral consistency by executing a subordinate for wartime atrocities and protecting Garcia Lovelace during the crisis. After escaping Roanapur, Caxton's team suffers heavy casualties from Roberta's attacks. Garcia intervenes by shooting Caxton with blanks, breaking Roberta's violent trance. In a final act of atonement, Caxton protects Roberta from his own men. Later encounters show him facilitating reconciliation between Roberta and victims' families.

=== Bren the Black Death ===
Bren the Black Death runs a murder for hire business. According to Revy, he has an office in Roanapur but rarely does jobs there because of overlapping contracts. Roberta hires him to gather a team to attack Grey Fox to drive them out into the open. He sends in a group of hired guns knowing very well that they will be slaughtered by the trained soldiers. He then kills the one survivor himself.

=== Filano ===
Filano (フィラノ, Firano) is an associate of Bren the Black Death. He observes the conflict between the Grey Fox unit and Roberta, demonstrating a preference for unconventional killing methods. Rather than using firearms, which he considers crude, he employs mundane objects or environmental hazards to stage deaths as accidents—particularly favoring pushes from heights or into traffic.

== U-1324 crew and passengers ==
=== Lieutenant Commander Wentzel Ahbe ===
Voiced by: Shigeru Ushiyama (Japanese); Brian Drummond (English)

Captain (or Lieutenant Commander) Wentzel Ahbe (アーベ, Ābe) commands the Type IXC U-1324 during World War II. After surviving the Battle of the Atlantic, his final mission in March 1945 transports personnel to Batavia. When depth charges from a U.S. Navy boat cripple the submarine near the Nicobar Islands, Ahbe releases his crew as oxygen runs out. He denounces Nazi leadership to an SS officer aboard, resulting in his execution and crew retaliation. A recipient of the Knight's Cross with Oak Leaves and Swords, his medals later appear on the black market. He was survived by his wife and two children.

=== Lieutenant Colonel Matsuto ===
Voiced by: Hitoshi Bifu (Japanese); Hiro Kanagawa (English)

Lieutenant Colonel Matsuto (松田, Matsudo) is an Imperial Japanese Army officer stationed in Germany to study aeronautics until early 1945. His planned return to Japanese-occupied Batavia aboard U-1324 forms the submarine's final mission. During the voyage from Kiel, he befriends Captain Ahbe and interacts regularly with the crew, often playing shogi with them. When U-1324 sustains fatal damage from depth charges deployed by the U.S. Navy near the Nicobar Islands, Matsuto performs ritual suicide with his sword rather than face capture. The character does not appear in the manga.

=== SS Lieutenant Colonel Spielberger ===
Voiced by: Takaya Kuroda (Japanese); Michael Dobson (English)

SS Lieutenant Colonel Spielberger (シュピールベルガー, Shupīruberugā) serves as the U-1324's second passenger, representing the SD. His mission involves safeguarding the painting The Twelve Knights Led by Brunhilda for a planned Nazi resurgence. Unlike Matsuto, he remains isolated during the voyage, showing little interaction with crew members. When Captain Ahbe condemns Nazi leadership, Spielberger executes him in anger. The crew immediately retaliates, killing the SS officer before he can complete his suicidal rampage. Though married with a family in Stuttgart, Spielberger demonstrates greater concern for his failed mission than his personal connections during the submarine's final hours.

== Aryan Socialist Union ==
The Aryan Socialist Union is a neo-Nazi organization modeled after the Nazi Sturmabteilung. Though heavily armed with various firearms and anti-tank weapons, the group remains unaware they are being manipulated by Alfred, the actual neo-Nazi leader who considers them incompetent. Over thirty members operate from a recovery ship with what appear to be civilian hostages serving as crew. Their confrontation with Lagoon Company results in near-total annihilation.

=== Ratchman ===
Voiced by: Ryūji Nakagi (Japanese); Richard Newman (English)

Ratchman (ラッチマン, Racchiman) is a short, fat man who leads the Aryan Socialist Union. He and his men are sent to retrieve a painting that was supposedly painted by Hitler and will reunite the Nazis and return them back to their former glory. He hopes that, by obtaining the painting, he will have proven himself and his men loyal enough to be accepted into the Neo-Nazi underworld. Though he shows loyalty on the surface, he is a coward at heart. Ratchman's lack of foresight and proper planning enables the Lagoon Company to sneak onto the ASU's recovery ship and launch a surprise attack while his men are drunk from celebrating after they recover the painting. He is murdered by Revy and Dutch.

=== Kruppen Feller ===
Voiced by: Ken Narita (Japanese); Brian Dobson (English)

Kruppen Feller (クルッペンフェラー, Kuruppen Ferā) commands the Aryan Socialist Union's Suicide Corps. He demonstrates particular enthusiasm for Ratchman's ideological declarations, matching his superior's fervor. Leading a diving team to U-1324, he survives the subsequent firefight with Revy and successfully retrieves the target painting.

During the assault on the Aryan Socialist Union's recovery ship, he attempts to arm himself but is shot by Revy in the vessel's magazine. The manga leaves his ultimate fate unresolved after this confrontation.

=== Fritz Stanford ===
Voiced by: Youichi Nishijima (Japanese); Mark Gibbon (English)

Fritz Stanford (ブリッツ・スタンフォード, Burittsu Sutanfōdo) is the Captain of the Nazi boat that is sent to obtain the World War II painting in the sunken U-boat. He is a physically huge man, and is filled with blind faith and overconfidence. In the end, it is this overconfidence that gets him killed when he brags about his weapon and threatens Revy (as she slowly reloads her weapon), who shoots him in the chest and then point blank in the head, mostly just to shut him up. He wields a large gold Luger chambered for the .454 Casull cartridge.

=== Alfred ===
Voiced by: Fumio Matsuoka (Japanese); French Tickner (English)

Alfred (アルフレード, Arufurēdo) heads the neo-Nazi underworld. As an elderly former SS member with likely combat experience from World War II, he maintains authority through calculated manipulation. Alfred orchestrates a loyalty test by directing Ratchman's Aryan Socialist Union to confront Lagoon Company, anticipating their defeat.

Viewing Ratchman's group as incompetent ideologues, Alfred considers their failure against what he regards as racially inferior opponents as confirmation of their weakness. Following their elimination, he expresses gratitude toward Dutch and Revy while demonstrating unexpected respect for Dutch despite racial prejudices. The operation ultimately reveals Alfred's involvement in manipulating both parties through an intermediary.

== Protectors of the Islamic Front ==
The Protectors of the Islamic Front is a Jihadist group based in South East Asia.

=== Masahiro Takenaka ===
Voiced by: Katsuhiko Sasaki (Japanese); Fred Henderson (English)

Masahiro Takenaka (竹中正洋, Takenaka Masahiro) is a co-leader of the terrorist group "Protectors of the Islamic Front" and a patient, sociable person who rarely loses his cool. Despite being involved with an Islamic terrorist group, he himself is an atheist. Born in the Adachi ward in Tokyo, Masahiro was once an enthusiastic activist for human rights before joining the Japanese Red Army during the Cold War. Later, he was forced to evade arrest by hiding overseas after most of its members were arrested; and it was the time he traveled to Bekaa, Lebanon, that he met Ibraha. Takenaka is based on the Japanese Red Army member Kozo Okamoto.

=== Ibraha ===
Voiced by: Ken Yamaguchi (Japanese); Mackenzie Gray (English)

Ibraha (イブラハ, Iburaha) is a co-leader of the "Protectors of the Islamic Front", leading one of its main cells in the Philippines. He is a Lebanese, and is resolute in his hatred of Israel, as his son was killed by Israeli soldiers in Beirut, Lebanon in 1987, after which he dedicated his life to destroying the West. Compared to Takenaka, he is the exact opposite in personality. While chasing Revy, Rock, and Shenhua towards a Basilan military base, he is shot and killed by Takenaka for refusing to pull their forces back for a retreat.

== The Washimine Group ==
The Washimine Group were a Yakuza formerly run by Ryuzo Washimine (鷲峰龍三, Washimine Ryūzō). Balalaika came to Japan to work out a deal with the Washimine group to expand their influence in Japan in exchange for helping them weaken a rival Yakuza group, the Kosa Council. However, when Hotel Moscow's methods went too far, Tsugio Bando, the current head of the Washimine group, tried to stop them and was killed by Balalaika, who decided she would instead destroy both groups and take over their operations. Following his death, Ryuzo's daughter was put in charge. In the end, the entire Washimine group, and family, were wiped out along with the Kosa Council.

=== Yukio Washimine ===
Voiced by: Houko Kuwashima (Japanese); Lalainia Lindbjerg (English)

Yukio Washimine (鷲峰雪緒, Washimine Yukio) becomes the reluctant heir to the Washimine-gumi yakuza organization following her father's death. A philosophically-inclined high school senior, her initial encounter with Rock during Hotel Moscow's Tokyo operations in the winter of 1995 briefly inspires his contemplation of returning to normal life. The Kosa Council's insistence on bloodline succession forces her into leadership despite her lack of criminal experience. Yukio's deepening relationship with bodyguard Ginji Matsuzaki motivates her embrace of yakuza life, though Rock attempts to dissuade her. When Ginji confronts Hotel Moscow, she assumes formal command to remain with him. After Revy kills Ginji during their confrontation, Yukio takes her own life with his sword.

=== Ginji Matsuzaki ===
Voiced by: Kiyoyuki Yanada (Japanese); Michael Adamthwaite (English)

Ginji Matsuzaki (松崎銀次, Matsuzaki Ginji) serves as underboss of the Washimine Group and personal protector to Yukio Washimine. Formerly known as "Hitokiri Ginji" for his exceptional swordsmanship, he demonstrates preternatural combat abilities including bullet deflection and evasion techniques. While skilled with firearms, he favors traditional blade combat. Following his leader's death, Ginji attempts to leave his violent past behind, operating a legitimate business while safeguarding Yukio. When Hotel Moscow kills his associate Tsugio Bando, he re-engages in combat operations. After rescuing Yukio from rogue enforcer Chaka—whom he executes following a brutal confrontation—Ginji supports Yukio's campaign against Hotel Moscow. During the final confrontation with Revy, Ginji's combat superiority becomes evident until Yukio's emotional declaration disrupts his focus. This momentary hesitation proves fatal, as Revy capitalizes on the distraction to deliver a lethal shot while sustaining a leg wound herself.

=== Tsugio Bando ===
Voiced by: Tomomichi Nishimura (Japanese); John Novak (English)

Tsugio Bando (坂東次男, Tsugio Bandō) is the wakagashira (underboss) of the Washimine Group. Since the position of boss of the Washimine Group is left vacant by the death of the former boss Ryuzo Washimine, Yukio's father, Tsugio is the actual boss of the Washimine Group. Tsugio is very loyal to the memory of Ryuzo, who had protected him after he just arrived in Tokyo from Osaka. Due to his hate of the Kosa Council's ill-treatment of the Washimine Group, he allied with Hotel Moscow for a short time in order for his group to rise and make a name for itself. However, his plans and Hotel Moscow's completely differed in approach as Balalaika was more brutal in her methods, much to the dismay of Bando. He is killed in a desperate attempt to assassinate Balalaika and protect the Washimine Group, Balalaika easily dodging his attempt to stab her and then breaking his neck, before sending back to the Washimine the suitcase including his body.

=== Yoshida ===
Voiced by: Kenta Miyake (Japanese); Trevor Devall (English)

Yoshida (吉田, Yoshida) is one of the enforcers working for the Washimine Group. He was very loyal to Tsugio Bando and refers to him as an older brother. Yoshida is usually seen as a bodyguard for Tsugio, and later Yukio when she inherits the leadership of the Washimine Group. During Yukio's inheritance of the Washimine Group's head position, it was Yoshida who rallied support for the young lady. While taking Yukio home, he is shot by Chaka, who is planning to kidnap her. Telling Yukio to escape, Yoshida is repeatedly gunned down before Chaka and his gang gives chase.

=== Chaka ===
Voiced by: Wataru Takagi (Japanese); Jonathan Holmes (English)

Chaka (チャカ) serves as an enforcer for the Washimine Group, adopting an American Wild West persona and demonstrating fluency in English. His violent tendencies and arrogant demeanor earn him little respect among peers. He manages a strip club owned by the organization before attempting to seize control of the group.

Chaka's reputation for brutality becomes evident when he assaults Rock during an altercation and later orchestrates Yukio Washimine's kidnapping with the intention of selling her into sexual slavery. This action prompts intervention from Revy and Ginji Matsuzaki, who eliminate his accomplices. During the confrontation, Chaka challenges Revy to a duel, but she humiliates him before directing him toward Ginji, who disarms him, severs his arms, and drowns him.

== The Lovelace Family ==
The Lovelace Family is one of thirteen South American families, and their origin is from Venezuela. Despite facing opposition from political rivals and harassment from Colombian cartels seeking their land, they maintain protection through Diego Lovelace's military and political connections. The family employs two combat-trained maids: Roberta (formerly FARC operative Rosarita Cisneros), wanted by cartels and law enforcement, and Fabiola Iglesias. Both serve as domestic staff and bodyguards, with Roberta having developed particularly close ties to the family.

=== Diego Jose San Fernando Lovelace ===
Voiced by: Ryūnosuke Ōbayashi (Japanese); Michael Kopsa (English)

Diego Jose San Fernando Lovelace (ディエゴ・フェルナンド・ラブレス, Diego Ferunando Raburesu) was the former head of the Lovelace family, eleventh in succession. While it is one of the thirteen noble families of South America, the Lovelace family fell upon hard times, with only the meager income from their plantations maintaining their lifestyle. He took in Rosarita Cisneros, when she was escaping from the Colombian Cartel as a favor to his old friend, Rosarita's father. He took her in and treated her as family. In October 1995, he was assassinated during a speech due to the fact his political beliefs were seen as a threat by many. This event makes Roberta take up the "Bloodhound" persona once more.

=== Garcia Lovelace ===
Voiced by: Kazue Ikura (Japanese); Cathy Weseluck (English)

Garcia Fernando Lovelace (ガルシア・フェルナンド・ラブレス, Garushia Ferunando Raburesu) becomes the twelfth head of the Lovelace family after his father's assassination in 1995. Initially introduced when kidnapped by Colombian cartels and transported by Lagoon Company, he later returns to Roanapur a year later with maid Fabiola to search for Roberta, demonstrating significant emotional growth noted by Rock. Garcia maintains familial relationships with both Roberta and Fabiola. Seeking help to locate Roberta, he enlists Lagoon Company along with Chang, Shenhua, Sawyer, and Lotton, though he primarily trusts Rock. His decisive plan to fake Caxton's death using blanks succeeds in breaking Roberta's violent rampage when she accidentally shoots him, shocking her back to sanity. Chang later remarks to Rock about the ongoing challenges facing the Lovelace family.

=== Roberta ===
Voiced by: Michie Tomizawa (Japanese); Tabitha St. Germain (English)

Roberta (ロベルタ, Roberuta) is a Colombian maid who served the Lovelace family in Venezuela for four years. Despite her poor domestic skills, she forms a deep bond with Garcia, the family's young heir. Before her life as a maid, she was known as Rosarita Cisneros (ロザリタ・チスネロス, Rozarita Chisunerosu), a former FARC guerrilla trained as an assassin in Cuba. Her violent past earns her the alias "Bloodhound of Florencia" for her relentless pursuit of objectives, as well as the wary respect of figures like Balalaika, who considers her a "hardcore terrorist" capable of overwhelming even Hotel Moscow.

Roberta's combat prowess is formidable, combining martial arts, stealth, and proficiency with firearms. Her physical abilities border on superhuman, with reflexes and endurance that prompt Rock to liken her to "a killer robot from the future." Though she abandons her violent past to serve the Lovelace family, the assassination of Diego Lovelace in October 1995 reignites her bloodlust. Consumed by vengeance, she descends into near-madness for nearly a year, haunted by hallucinations of past victims and indiscriminately targeting perceived enemies. Her rampage destabilizes Roanapur, drawing the attention of criminal syndicates and U.S. Special Forces.

During her final confrontation in 1996, she nearly kills Garcia in a hallucinatory rage before realizing her mistake. The shock restores her sanity, and Garcia's intervention—firing blanks to stop her—spares both her and their target. Afterward, she reconciles with Garcia and returns to Venezuela. In the anime adaptation, she sustains severe injuries, losing an arm, an eye, and part of a leg, but gradually recovers enough to walk again.

=== Fabiola Iglesias ===
Voiced by: Satsuki Yukino (Japanese); Shannon Chan-Kent (English)

Fabiola Iglesias (ファビオラ・イグレシアス, Fabiora Igureshiasu) is a combat-trained maid serving the Lovelace household under Roberta. She is the youngest of the armed maids and carries twin shotguns along with a concealed grenade launcher. Born in the slums of Caracas, she maintains strict discipline while displaying a more playful demeanor than her mentor.

When Fabiola arrives in Roanapur to assist Garcia, her resemblance to Roberta causes initial alarm among locals. She demonstrates moral opposition to Revy's ruthless methods during their encounters. During the confrontation with U.S. forces, she witnesses Roberta accidentally shoot Garcia and provides medical assistance. She later confronts Rock about his manipulative actions before returning to Venezuela.

Fabiola exhibits strong protective instincts toward Garcia while maintaining professional boundaries. Her combat training includes capoeira and firearms proficiency, though she exercises restraint in violent situations. During leisure time, she enjoys swimming but remains formal in her interactions with Garcia despite their close working relationship.

== Other characters ==
Kageyama (景山, Kageyama)
Voiced by: Jōji Nakata (Japanese); Ross Douglas (English)
One of the department chiefs of Asahi Industries, based in Tokyo. He was entrusted by its board of directors to ensure that their illegal activities were not exposed. Kageyama betrayed Rock by appointing Captain to kill him and the Lagoon Company, thus encouraging Rock to stay on with the Lagoon Company. Although Kageyama is married and has three children (consisting of one teenage son, one teenage daughter, and one pre-teen daughter), he seems to place more emphasis on his job than on his family.

Hänsel (ヘンゼル, Hanzeru) and Gretel (グレーテル, Gurēteru)
Voiced by: Omi Minami (Japanese); Ashleigh Ball (English) (Hänsel)
Voiced by: Tomoko Kaneda (Japanese); Jocelyne Loewen (English) (Gretel)
Hänsel and Gretel (the twins refer to each other using the Romanian terms "Fratele Meu" (my brother) and "Sora Mea" (my sister)) are Romanian twin orphans abandoned in a state-run institution following the Romanian Revolution. Sold into black market operations, they endure repeated participation in abusive films involving violence against children, which ultimately destroys their psychological stability. The twins develop alternating personalities through dissociative identity disorder, adopting the names "Hänsel" and "Gretel", while exhibiting extreme sadistic behavior. Upon arriving in Roanapur, the twins demonstrate their brutality by capturing one of Balalaika's men, subjecting him to torturous medical experiments before killing him. They subsequently murder their benefactor Verrocchio and his associates despite owing them assistance. Their violent tendencies stem from prolonged exposure to abuse, leaving them incapable of distinguishing normal human interaction. In one instance, one twin exposes themselves to Rock in a misguided gesture of gratitude, horrifying him with their psychological damage.
The twins employ strategic cunning in combat, using decoys and exploiting their innocent appearance. One wields an axe while the other carries an automatic rifle disproportionate to their size. When Hotel Moscow retaliates for their attacks, one twin falls to Balalaika's snipers while the other briefly escapes. The surviving twin boards the Black Lagoon, developing an attachment to Rock before being killed during disembarkation. Their deaths conclude a short life marked by unrelenting trauma.
Janet Bhai (ジャネット・バーイー, Janetto Bāī)
Voiced by: Miki Nagasawa (Japanese); Kelly Sheridan (English)
Also known as Greenback Jane (ジェーン, Jēn), is an Indian counterfeiter and computer hacker specializing in currency replication. She leads an international team of associates connected through online networks. Her expertise includes detailed knowledge of U.S. currency design and security features. Janet develops romantic interest in Benny after observing his technical skills, maintaining a long-distance relationship with him. She returns to Roanapur following the Lovelace incident, where she and her team compromise the systems of Rainbach AG corporation while framing a PLA operative. Her personality exhibits overtly sexual behavior that other characters note as extreme.
"Groovy" Guy Russell ("グルーヴィ・ガイ"・ラッセル, "Gurūvi Gai" Rasseru)
Voiced by: Masaki Terasoma (Japanese); Brian Dobson (English)
A middle-aged American man who works for the Florida crime syndicate that's tracking Jane. He is quite distinguishable, since he dresses like a cowboy: he has the trademark hat, boots with spurs, a revolver at the hip, bandolier belt, tan shirt and jeans. He is not taken seriously by the other bounty hunters because he is an outsider. Even Shenhua says, "Cowboy, this no Florida", meaning that he is in over his head. However, his skills are shown to be more than everyone thought, when he is the last bounty hunter left in the hunt for Jane and he duels Eda on board the Lagoon. It is then later revealed that he and Eda have met previously in the United States, although she says they have never met. Shortly before killing him, she confesses to him to be from the CIA.
Vasili Laptev (ヴァシリ・ラプチェフ, Vashiri Rapuchefu)
Voiced by: Toshihiko Kojima (Japanese); Ted Cole (English)
The boss of a branch of the Russian mafia that is based in Tokyo. A former KGB officer, Laptev had many difficulties operating in Japan due to his status as a gaijin (foreigner). Considered distasteful and incompetent by Balalaika, he appeared to lose his standing with his peers back in Russia and this was reflected in his arrogant personality, since he did not speak Japanese despite being based in Japan. Laptev's detachment is slaughtered single-handedly by Ginji when the fallout between Hotel Moscow and the Washimine-gumi begins.
Masami Kosa
Voiced by: Masahiro Tanaka (Japanese); Andrew Kavadas (English)
Head of the Kosa Council. In past both Washimine and Kosa Yakuza's were allies as Yukio's father and Masami's "brother" were blood brothers. When they both died and Masami took over, any relationship the two groups had were gone and the Kosa's mistreated the Washime group badly to the point that Masami wouldn't recognize Yukio as the heir to the Washimine group and wanted someone in his group to take over. His mistreatment led the Washime group to call Hotel Moscow to weaken them. In the end of Fujiyama Gangsters arc, Masami was about to form an alliance with Hotel Moscow when Balalaika, after talking with Rock, decided to kill him and his lieutenants cited she wouldn't want to work with a group with such poor merchandise.
Maki (まき)
Voiced by: Shiho Kawaragi (Japanese); Ashleigh Ball (English)
A female high school junior and goes to the same high school as her friend, Yukio Washimine prior to her rise to leadership of the Washimine Group. Both of them tearfully parted ways as Yukio planned to sever all ties to her former life. Maki seems to be a symbolic representative of the typical Japanese high school girl who is interested in skin-care, has a part-time job, reads light novels, and has poor school grades.
Li Xinlin (李欣林)
A Chinese hacker in the People's Liberation Army. She is assigned to infiltrate Greenback Jane's group under the alias Feng Yifei (馮亦菲). However, Jane and the other hacker are aware of this and use her to tap into the PLA's computers. When this is discovered, Li's superiors believed she was a traitor and put a contract on her life to Roanapur-based mercenaries. She ultimately is saved from a group of PLA-hired hitmen by gaining the protection of the Italian mafia and laundering their money. Feng forms a new life in Roanapur in this role, meeting with Rock in the subsequent arc. She kisses him several times throughout her appearances, though they have not yet started a relationship.
