= Kill (song) =

"KILL"

Single by Mell
- B-side: "On my own"
- Released: November 19, 2008
- Genre: J-Pop
- Length: 20:03
- Label: Geneon
- Songwriter(s): Mell, Kazuya Takase
- Producer(s): I've Sound

Mell singles chronology
"'Virgin's high!/kicks!'" (2007)	"KILL" (2008)	"'RIDEBACK'" (2009)

KILL is the 4th single of I've Sound singer, Mell. It is released on November 19, 2008, a year and almost two months after the release of her 3rd single. The title track will be used as the opening theme for Mamoru Oshii's live-action film entitled KILL (斬～KILL～, Kiru～KILL～) while the B-side song On my own will be used as the ending theme for the same film. Since this single only reached #37 in the Oricon weekly charts and only charted for two weeks, this is Mell's weakest single to date.

The single will come in a regular CD-only edition (GNCV-0012) and a limited CD+DVD edition (GNCV-0011) which will contain the PV for KILL.

== Track listing ==
1. KILL—4:53
  Lyrics: Mell
  Composition/Arrangement: Kazuya Takase
2. On my own—5:10
  Lyrics: Mell
  Composition/Arrangement: Tomoyuki Nakazawa
3. KILL (instrumental) -- 4:53
4. On my own (instrumental) -- 5:07

== Charts and sales ==
Oricon Ranking (Weekly)	Sales
37	3,403 (after 2 charting weeks)
