= Virgin's High!/Kicks! =

Single by Mell
- Released: September 26, 2007
- Genre: J-pop, industrial pop, electronic rock
- Length: 16:16
- Label: Geneon
- Producer: I've Sound

Mell singles chronology
"'Proof/No Vain'" (2007)	"Virgin's High!/Kicks!" (2007)	"'Kill'" (2008)

"Virgin's High!/Kicks!" is Mell's third single under Geneon Entertainment. "Virgin's high!" was used as the opening theme for the anime series Sky Girls. The single reached #15 in the Oricon charts and sold 19,800 copies. This is the first single wherein Kazuya Takase only composed and arranged one song for Mell.

== Track listing ==
1. Virgin's High! -- 4:21
  Composition: Maiko Iuchi
  Arrangement: Maiko Iuchi
  Lyrics: Mell
2. Kicks! -- 3:48
  Composition: Kazuya Takase
  Arrangement: Kazuya Takase
  Lyrics: Mell
3. Virgin's High! (instrumental) -- 4:21
4. Kicks! (instrumental) -- 3:46
