= Rideback (manga) =

Japanese manga series

- First tankōbon volume cover, featuring Rin Ogata and her red Rideback Fuego
- Genre: Action; Mecha; Political drama
- Manga
- Written by: Tetsurō Kasahara
- Published by: Shogakukan
- Imprint: Ikki Comix
- Magazine: Monthly Ikki
- Original run: April 25, 2003 – October 25, 2008
- Volumes: 10
- Anime television series
- Directed by: Atsushi Takahashi
- Produced by: Fuminori Hara; Kazuo Onuki; Yasuyuki Ueda
- Written by: Hideo Takayashiki; Ken Iizuka
- Music by: Takafumi Wada
- Studio: Madhouse
- Licensed by: Crunchyroll
- Original network: Chiba TV, TV Saitama, tvk, KBS, Sun TV, Tokyo MX, AT-X
- English network: US: Funimation Channel
- Original run: January 12, 2009 – March 30, 2009
- Episodes: 12
- Novel

Rideback: Cannonball Run
- Written by: Boncho Kuga
- Illustrated by: Tetsurō Kasahara
- Published by: Shogakukan
- Imprint: Gagaga Bunko
- Published: January 21, 2009
- icon

Rideback (stylized as RɪᴅᴇBᴀᴄᴋ) is a Japanese manga series written and illustrated by Tetsurō Kasahara. It was serialized in Shogakukan's seinen manga magazine Monthly Ikki from April 2003 to October 2008, with its chapters collected in ten tankōbon volumes. Set in Japan in the 2020s, it follows the story of college student Rin Ogata, as she comes across a two-wheeled automobile robot known as a Rideback. It was adapted into a 12-episode anime television series by Madhouse broadcast from January to March 2009. In North America, Funimation licensed the anime series for English release.

== Plot ==
In the year of 2020 (2025 in the anime), an organization called the GGF (GGP in the anime) (Note: In the manga, this organization is called the GGF, an acronym for Global Government Force (世界統治軍, Seikai Toushigun) lit. 'World Government Army'. In the anime, this organization is called the GGP, an acronym for Global Government Plan (世界統治構想, Seikai Toushi Kousou; lit. 'World Government Plan').) has taken control of the world. Rin Ogata was a promising up-and-coming ballet dancer but suffered a serious injury while dancing and decided to quit. Years later in college, she comes across a club building and soon finds herself intrigued by a transforming motorcycle-like robotic vehicle called a "Rideback". She soon finds that her unique ballet skills with balance and finesse make her a born natural on a Rideback. However, those same skills also get her into serious trouble with the government.

== Characters ==
=== Musashino University Rideback Club ===
Rin Ogata (尾形 琳, Ogata Rin)
Voiced by: Nana Mizuki (Japanese); Tia Ballard (English)
Rin is a freshman in the drama department at Musashino University. Being a talented ballet dancer, she was expected to be the natural successor to her late mother Yuki, having participated in dance competitions from a young age. However, she subsequently decided to quit after fracturing her left ankle two years before enrolling at Musashino University, where she first comes across the red Rideback Fuego.
Tamayo Kataoka (片岡 珠代, Kataoka Tamayo)
Voiced by: Romi Park (Japanese); Stephanie Young (English)
Tamayo is a junior in the French literature department at Musashino University, being an upperclassman to Rin and Haruki. She is the current champion for the Eighth All Japan Rideback Race Championship using her green Rideback RBZ.
Tenshiro Okakura (岡倉 天司郎, Okakura Tenshirō)
Voiced by: Rikiya Koyama (Japanese); Bryan Massey (English)
Okakura is the adviser of the Musashino University Rideback Club, who possesses a strict character and a large nose. He was honorably discharged from the GGP.
Haruki Hishida (菱田 春樹, Hishida Haruki)
Voiced by: Yūji Ueda (Japanese); Micah Solusod (English)
Haruki is a sophomore in the engineering department at Musashino University and an upperclassman to Rin. He is an enthusiast of Ridebacks.
Shoko Uemura (上村 しょう子, Uemura Shōko)
Voiced by: Megumi Toyoguchi (Japanese); Kristi Kang (English)
Shoko is Rin's childhood friend, who becomes Rin's roommate at Musashino University.
Suzuri Uchida (内田 すずり, Uchida Suzuri)
Voiced by: Megumi Matsumoto (Japanese); Trina Nishimura (English)
Suzuri is a freshman in the fine arts department at Musashino University. She is extremely enthusiastic as she is a huge fan of Rin.

=== GGF / GGP ===
Romanov Kallenbach (ロマノフ・カレンバーク, Romanofu Karenbāku)
Voiced by: Shin-ichiro Miki (Japanese); Jason Douglas (English)
Romanov is a colonel sworn in as the corrupt commander-in-chief of the GGP, who runs the government with a dictatorship approach. He is later shot and killed by Misawo. He is an anime original character.
Misawo Yokoyama (横山 みさを, Yokoyama Misawo)
Voiced by: Risa Hayamizu (Japanese); Jennifer Seman (English)
Misawo is a member of the GGP, who moonlights as a lecturer of the literature department at Musashino University. She is later revealed to be a double agent for Kiefer.

=== BMA ===
Kiefer (キーファ, Kiifa)
Voiced by: Toshiyuki Morikawa (Japanese); Robert McCollum (English)
Kiefer is a first lieutenant and the leader of the BMA, (Note: BMA is an acronym for Borderless Military Alliance (国境なき軍事同盟, Kokkyō Naki Gunji Dōmei).) who rides the black Rideback Black Knight. During the Battle of Arizona ten years ago, he served as a soldier in the same unit of the GGP as Okakura and Romanov before later defecting to the BMA.
Kenji Ogata (尾形 堅司, Ogata Kenji)
Voiced by: Kazuma Horie (Japanese); Jessie James Grelle (English)
Kenji is Rin's younger brother.

=== Other characters ===
Yuki Ogata (尾形 遊紀, Ogata Yuki)
Voiced by: Mie Sonozaki (Japanese); Leah Clark (English)
Yuki is Rin's mother, a talented ballet dancer who died six years before the series' story.
Kei Yoda (依田 恵, Yoda Megumi)
Voiced by: Sanae Kobayashi (Japanese); Cynthia Cranz (English)
Kei is a freelance journalist who works alongside her partner Sato.
Ryunosuke Kataoka (片岡 龍之介, Kataoka Ryūnosuke)
Voiced by: Hidenobu Kiuchi (Japanese); J. Michael Tatum (English)
Ryunosuke is an executive of the National Police Agency and Tamayo's older brother.

== Media ==
=== Manga ===
Rideback, written and illustrated by Tetsurō Kasahara, was serialized in Shogakukan's seinen manga magazine Monthly Ikki from April 25, 2003, to October 25, 2008. Shogakukan collected its chapters in ten tankōbon volumes, published from May 28, 2004, to February 25, 2009.

==== Volumes ====
No.	Japanese release date	Japanese ISBN
1	May 28, 2004	978-4-09-188471-8
2	July 30, 2004	978-4-09-188472-5
3	January 28, 2005	978-4-09-188473-2
4	May 30, 2005	978-4-09-188474-9
5	December 26, 2005	978-4-09-188307-0
6	June 30, 2006	978-4-09-188325-4
7	December 26, 2006	978-4-09-188350-6
8	June 29, 2007	978-4-09-188367-4
9	December 26, 2008	978-4-09-188430-5
10	February 25, 2009	978-4-09-188455-8

=== Anime ===
An anime adaptation was announced in April 2007. The 12-episode series was animated by Madhouse and directed by Atsushi Takahashi. It was broadcast on Chiba TV, TV Saitama, tvk, KBS Kyoto, Sun TV, Tokyo MX and AT-X from January 12 to March 30, 2009. (Note: Chiba TV listed the air dates for the series on Sunday at 24:00, which is effectively Monday at midnight JST.) The opening theme is "Rideback", performed by Mell, and the ending theme is "Kioku" (記憶; lit. 'Memory') by Younha featuring Goku.

In North America, Funimation announced the license to the series at Anime Central in May 2010. Funimation released the series on Blu-ray and DVD on June 28, 2011. The series made its American television debut on July 26, 2011, on Funimation Channel.

==== Episodes ====
No.	Title	Original release date
1	"The Crimson Iron Horse"; Transliteration: "Shinku no Tetsuba" (Japanese: 深紅の鉄馬)	January 12, 2009
In the year 2025, a resistance group called the Global Government Plan (GGP) took control of the world. Being forced to give up her dream as a ballet dancer two years ago, Rin Ogata enrolls as a drama freshman at Musashino University, where her childhood friend Shoko Uemura is her roommate. During lunch, Rin meets fine arts freshman Suzuri Uchida, who is a huge fan of hers. Afterwards, Shoko tells Suzuri that Rin stopped being a ballet dancer after fracturing her left ankle. During a downpour, Rin seeks shelter inside the Rideback Club garage. She is encouraged by engineering sophomore Haruki Hishida to hop on the red Rideback Fuego and take it for a test drive when the rain lets up outside. Rin starts to lose control of the Rideback Fuego gone berserk as she is taken across the college campus. Tamayo Kataoka, a French literature junior and the Rideback Club leader, hitches a ride with Haruki on a scooter. Tenshiro Okakura, the Rideback Club advisor, gives chase in a black Rideback and eventually fixes the circuit board of the Rideback Fuego. However, Rin rides off a cliff before she has the chance to hit the brakes.
2	"Tamayo the Maestro!? S.L.F ~ Spread Legs Form"; Transliteration: "Tamayo Jōtō !? S.L.F ~ Supureddo Reggusu Fōmu" (Japanese: 珠代上等!?S.L.F〜スプレッド·レッグス·フォーム)	January 19, 2009
The next day, Haruki and his friend Dota Kawai invite Rin to join the Rideback Club. Okakura learns from Tamayo that Rin is a former ballet dancer. At the Rideback Club garage, Tamayo introduces her green Rideback RBZ and challenges Rin to a race scheduled on Saturday at ten o'clock in the morning. Shoko and Suzuri later encourage Rin to accept the challenge. Rin calls her younger brother Kenji Ogata, who reveals that Tamayo was last year's Rideback champion. On the day of the race, Rin finally arrives at the Rideback Club garage, where Haruki has finished repairing the Rideback Fuego, while Shoko and Suzuri come to show some support for Rin. Tamayo gives Rin a handicap for the race from the Rideback Club garage to the water tower and back. Rin loses her balance at a curve and falls into a lake, but this does not stop her from continuing the race. When Rin passes Tamayo at a tight corner, Tamayo suffers a mild concussion when she is thrown off her Rideback RBZ. Tamayo decides to train Rin for the upcoming Rideback tournament, while Shoko tells Rin that Suzuri was inspired to join the Rideback Club.
3	"And There's the Flag"; Transliteration: "Soshite Furaggu wa Furareru" (Japanese: そして旗(フラッグ) はふられる)	January 26, 2009
While Suzuri takes the orange Rideback Balon for a spin, Haruki informs Rin that the Rideback Fuego is not cleared for use in a sanctioned race or tournament. Rin and Tamayo both enter the Eighth All Japan Rideback Race Championship totaling twenty-two riders, but Rin has trouble maneuvering the Rideback Balon during a practice run. During the preliminaries, Tamayo places first, while Rin places twenty-first. In a bidding strategy, Haruki disables the ride assist module known as the ACS from the Rideback Balon, which in doing so will mimic the Rideback Fuego. After visiting his hospitalized father Nanpu Kataoka, Tamayo's older brother Ryunosuke Kataoka, an executive of the National Police Agency, and his assistant Tsutomu Yamamoto meet with colonel Romanov Kallenbach, the soon-to-be commander-in-chief of the GGP, who wants to deploy a line of police-issued White Riders. During the race, Rin eventually makes a comeback and places fourth, but she is forced to retire on the last lap when the engine of the Rideback Balon overheats. Tamayo wins the race, beating mischievous twin brothers Takeshi and Hiroshi Cobra. At night, Rin takes the Rideback Fuego for a ride, momentarily telling Okakura that she trusts the Rideback Fuego with her life.
4	"A Close Call for Shoko"; Transliteration: "Shōko, Kiki Ippatsu" (Japanese: しょう子、危機一髪)	February 2, 2009
On Sunday, Haruki tells Rin that the Rideback Balon needs repairing and the Rideback Fuego needs a tune-up. Haruki and Dota take Rin and Suzuri to meet up with Shoko at the mall in the TV Tower, but they are stuck in traffic due to an scheduled inauguration for Romanov. At the mall, Shoko suddenly becomes a hostage during a terrorist attack made by the Borderless Military Alliance (BMA). With no way of contacting Shoko, Rin instinctively hops on the Rideback Fuego and drives towards the mall. As the GGP begins to implement a counterterrorist operation, a freelance journalist named Kei Yoda and her partner named Sato climb to the roof of the mall in order to get the inside snoop. After finally getting in contact with Shoko, Rin breaks through a blockade formed by the GGP and rescues Shoko inside the mall, evading the gunfire of the BMA. While escaping, Rin becomes cornered by the GGP at a bridge until she is saved by Kiefer, the leader of the BMA, who launches a missile at a helicopter. As Rin takes Shoko to safety, Kiefer then tells Rin that the Rideback Fuego is programmed to choose its rider.
5	"The Mysterious RideBack Girl"; Transliteration: "Nazo no Raidobakku Shōjo" (Japanese: 謎のライドバック少女)	February 9, 2009
Okakura decides to cancel all club activities and plans to dismantle the Rideback Fuego. Sato tells Kei that Tamayo is the current Rideback champion. The news reports that there were seven people killed and 167 people injured after the BMA hijacked the TV Tower, though the public is unaware about Rin and the Rideback Fuego. Yamamoto informs Ryunosuke that Okakura was honorably discharged from the GGP in the past. The next day, Rin meets up with Haruki, Suzuri and Dota at the Rideback Club garage, where the Rideback Fuego is no longer there. Okakura later confirms to Rin that the Rideback Fuego has been dismantled and sold for scrap. Kei eventually finds Tamayo in the cafeteria and tries to interview her about what happened yesterday. At the amusement arcade, Kenji runs into an old friend named Kizaki, who mentions a street race. As Haruki, Suzuri and Dota have dinner together, the news reports footage of Rin as an unidentified female Rideback rider. In a meeting with Romanov, both Ryunosuke and Yamamoto are briefly shown classified information about Rin from Misawo Yokoyama, a member of the GGP.
6	"The Lightning-Fast RideBack"; Transliteration: "Denkō Sekka Raido" (Japanese: 電光石火ライド)	February 16, 2009
During summer vacation, Tamayo demands Okakura to tell her more about the Rideback Fuego. Sato informs Kei that Rin is the unidentified female Rideback rider. Rin visits her grandmother Miyuki Ogata at the family home. The GGP has identified Kiefer as the leader of the BMA. Rin and Shoko briefly meet up at the beach, where Rin expresses her worry for Shoko due to a past incident. Kenji gets involved with Kizaki and his biker gang, who are testing out four unmarked Rideback Gremlins. Upon finding Rin, Kei takes her by car as they pursue Kenji and Kizaki's biker gang having a reckless street race nearby. Kenji and Kizaki's biker gang enter an expressway before the police closes it off, prompting Kei to take a detour off-road. It is revealed that the GGP is behind a combat operations test which involves the biker gang being targeted by two prototype White Riders. Kenji is left standing after Kizaki's biker gang is taken out by the White Riders. Rin commandeers Kenji's purple Rideback Gremlin and defeats the White Riders. Though she saves Kenji's life, Rin becomes surrounded by the GGP at an overpass.
7	"Crime and Punishment"; Transliteration: "Tsumi to Batsu" (Japanese: 罪と×)	February 23, 2009
With Rin and Kenji being taken into custody, Kenji protects Rin by admitting to a murder that he did not commit. Haruki, Shoko, Suzuri and Dota worry when Rin does not show up at the Rideback Club garage. In order to lift up everyone's spirits, Suzuri takes the Rideback Balon for a spin in the parking lot. Rin has a nightmare of Kiefer telling her that she is the chosen one. As the GGP starts deploying the White Riders across the nation, Ryunosuke becomes outraged at Romanov upon learning that Rin is being transferred to and detained in a facility run by the GGP. Tamayo follows Okakura to a junkyard, where it is revealed that the Rideback Fuego was never dismantled. Okakura realizes that he is being spied on by the GGP. While Rin is being transferred via armored truck, she gets apprehended by the BMA, which is then reported on the news. Upon returning to the Rideback Club garage, Okakura is escorted by the BMA. Inside a mansion, a shackled Rin comes face-to-face with Kiefer.
8	"Get Ride! The Chosen One"; Transliteration: "Get Ride! Erabareshi Mono" (Japanese: GET RIDE! 選ばれし者)	March 2, 2009
Kiefer unshackles Rin after telling her that he is aware of the adrenaline rush that she gets from driving a Rideback. Kei researches the Battle of Arizona, which happened ten years ago when Okakura and Kiefer served as soldiers under the leadership of Romanov in the same unit of the GGP. Before releasing Okakura to rescue Rin, the BMA plants explosives as a trap set for the strike team of the GGP at an abandoned weather station. Kei speaks with Tamayo, revealing that Okakura and Romanov fought alongside each other during the war. Kiefer tells Rin that Okakura created the Rideback Fuego. Kei goes to Ryunosuke, seeking a way to clear Okakura's name. For the thrill of a joyride, Rin drives Kiefer's green Rideback Black Knight, while Kiefer drives his black Rideback Black Knight, sharing a lighthearted dance in the rear courtyard. The BMA fends off the GGP from approaching the mansion. Okakura is shot in the right arm as he finds Rin waiting for him in the rear courtyard. In the woods, Kiefer critically injures a lieutenant of the GGP named Gatobu before transmitting a threatening message to Romanov by using Gatobu's walkie-talkie.
9	"In the Sunny Garden"; Transliteration: "Hidamari no Niwa de" (Japanese: 陽だまりの庭で)	March 9, 2009
Okakura apologetically confirms to Rin that he created the Rideback Fuego. While Gatobu is being hospitalized, Romanov declares a state of emergency, in which the news reports that the GGP will enforce a de facto martial law for the local and military police to temporarily set up security checkpoints and seize all Ridebacks effective immediately. Rin and Okakura go to Tamayo's safe house, where Tamayo treats Okakura's gunshot wound. Before leaving, Okakura requests Tamayo to look after Rin. Haruki sends a message to Shoko, ensuring that Rin and Tamayo are laying low for now. While fishing, Rin learns that Tamayo received the Rideback RBZ as a gift from her father Nanpu, though Rin wishes to finally disassociate from Ridebacks. At night, Sato delivers the Rideback Fuego to Tamayo. Okakura meets with Kiefer and proposes an offer. Previously advised by Ryunosuke, Tamayo gives Nanpu a call. Rin finds the Rideback Fuego and the Rideback RBZ parked behind the safe house. In the Rideback Club garage, Sato delivers a box of base oil to Haruki, Shoko, Suzuri and Dota, all of whom are relieved after reading a letter from Tamayo and watching a video from Rin.
10	"Master of the War"	March 16, 2009
Ryunosuke and Yamamoto watch a video of Kei failing to interview private first class Robert, who served under Romanov during the Battle of Arizona. Haruki, Suzuri and Dota drive to the shopping center with the Rideback Balon in tow to attend a political demonstration, while Rin, Tamayo and Sato manage to pass a security checkpoint with a fake permit, successfully smuggling the Rideback Fuego and the Rideback RBZ. Kiefer and Okakura plan an assault on the GGP in order to settle a vendetta against Romanov. The GGP detains Nanpu in his hospital room. Suzuri tells Haruki and Dota that she would rather see Rin dance at the nearby theater, though Suzuri is momentarily mistaken as the unidentified female Rideback rider. Misawo requests Ryunosuke to exploit Hesner Incorporated, the manufacturer of the White Riders. Shoko makes it in time for the political demonstration. As Rin and Tamayo travel by train, they see Suzuri being pursued by the White Riders. Suzuri is ultimately killed by the White Riders when she tries to jump over a hill in the park, leaving Shoko devastated. At the base of the BMA, Rin blames Suzuri's death on herself and Okakura for their obsession with Ridebacks.
11	"Cloudy Followed by Occasional Rain..."; Transliteration: "Kumori Nochi Ame Tokidoki..." (Japanese: 曇りのち雨ときどき...)	March 23, 2009
Rin recalls that her dreams of becoming just like her late mother Yuki Ogata were shattered when she fractured her left ankle, but she later became friends with Shoko. Afterwards, Rin refuses Kiefer's invitation to launch an assault on the GGP. Shoko and Haruki are unable to buy flowers to honor Suzuri since all the stores are closed. Okakura hacks into the mainframe of the GGP, while Tamayo plans to flee the country via helicopter. Rin is relieved that she no longer has to live in the shadow of Yuki, but Rin had a glimpse of hope when she first rode the Rideback Fuego. The next day, the BMA launches an assault on the GGP. Tamayo reveals that Suzuri wanted to see Rin dance again. As Rin and Tamayo ride the elevator towards the helipad on the rooftop, Rin has a flashback of when Yuki told her to follow her dreams. When Rin decides that she cannot leave, Tamayo runs down the stairs to the first floor. The base of the BMA is overrun by a fleet of the autonomous Rideback Grimoires, but Rin and Tamayo manage to escape on the Rideback Fuego and the Rideback RBZ.
12	"To the Stage of Light"; Transliteration: "Hikari no Butai e" (Japanese: 光の舞台へ)	March 30, 2009
When the fuel tank of Tamayo's Rideback RBZ is shot, Rin diverts the Rideback Grimoires to pursue her towards the shopping center. Meanwhile, the GGP and the BMA have a full-on shootout. Shoko watches live coverage of Rin being chased by the Rideback Grimoires. Upon being thrown off the Rideback Fuego by the Rideback Grimoires, Rin falls unconscious and recalls when Yuki told her that lives are defined by light. Rin regains consciousness just as Okakura arrives to rescue her, allowing her to hop back on the Rideback Fuego. Kiefer ultimately kills Gatobu in a duel, while Romanov is forced to call a ceasefire. Rin arrives at the park where Suzuri was killed, and she battles the Rideback Grimoires in a fierce dance. Kiefer and Romanov face off on the helipad, but Romanov ends up getting shot by Misawo, a double agent for Kiefer. It begins to snow when Rin defeats all the Rideback Grimoires. Soon after, Nanpu is put in charge of heading a new form of government. During the new school year, the Rideback Club resumes activities, while Rin announces her return to ballet amidst the falling cherry blossom flower petals in front of Shoko.

=== Novel ===
A novel, titled Rideback: Cannonball Run (RIDEBACK―キャノンボール・ラン―, Raidobakku Kyanon Bōru Ran) was released by Shogakukan, under its Gagaga Bunko, on January 21, 2009.

== See also ==
- Atom: The Beginning, a manga series illustrated by Tetsuro Kasahara
