= Mell =

Japanese electronic music singer

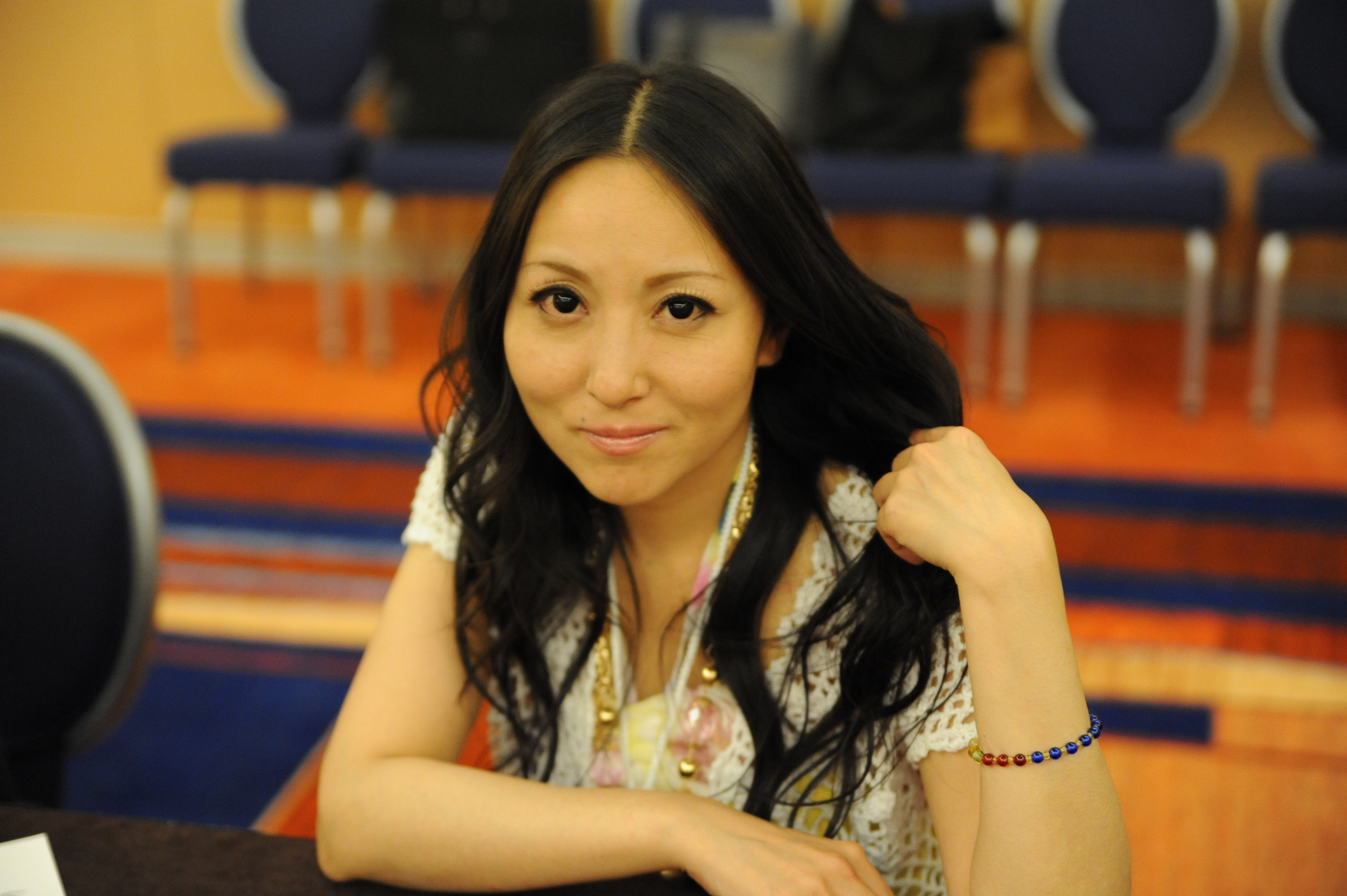
- Mell in 2009

Background information
- Origin: Sapporo, Hokkaido, Japan
- Genres: Electronica, industrial, J-pop, electronic rock, techno, trance
- Occupations: Singer, songwriter
- Years active: 1997–2013
- Label: Geneon
- Website: nbcuni-music.com/ive/mell/index2.html

Mell (stylized as MELL) is a female Japanese singer from Sapporo, Japan, who is signed to Geneon Universal Entertainment. She is a former member of the Sapporo-based I've Sound, and one of its main vocalists. Mell has contributed vocals to several anime soundtracks including Black Lagoon, Hayate the Combat Butler, Rideback, Shakugan no Shana, and Sky Girls.

After battling an unknown illness over a prolonged period, Mell left I've Sound after the release of her compilation album Entrust: The Name of Mell on March 20, 2013.

== Discography ==
=== Albums ===
| Album information | Sales |
|---|---|
| Mellscope: Released: August 20, 2008; Oricon top 300 position: 13; Singles: "Red fraction", "Proof/no vain", "Virgin's high!/kicks!" | 15,300 |
| Mirage: Released: October 27, 2010; Oricon top 300 position: 27; Singles: "Proof/no vain", "Kill", "Rideback" | 4,674 |
| Entrust: The Name of Mell: Released: March 20, 2013; Oricon top 300 position: | |

=== Singles ===
| Single information | Sales |
|---|---|
| "Red fraction": Released: June 14, 2006; Oricon top 200 position: 11; Theme song from: Black Lagoon | 38,000 |
| "Proof/no vain": Released: May 30, 2007; Oricon top 200 position: 18; Ending song from: Hayate the Combat Butler | 13,000 |
| "Virgin's high!/kicks!": Released: September 26, 2007; Oricon top 200 position: 15; Theme song from: Sky Girls | 20,000 |
| "Kill": Released: November 19, 2008; Oricon top 200 position: 37; Theme song from: Kiru: Kill | 3,400 |
| "Rideback": Released: March 4, 2009; Oricon top 200 position: 19; Theme song from: Rideback | 11,100 |
| "Kara no Tsubomi": Released: July 29, 2009; Oricon top 200 position: 153 | 4,700 |

=== DVDs ===
Mell First Live Tour 2008 Scope DVD
Released on April 29, 2009

1. Under Superstition
2. Way beyond there
3. Kill
4. No vain
5. On my own
6. Permit
7. Proof
8. Kicks!
9. Scope
10. Red fraction
11. The first finale in me
12. Egen
13. Virgin's high!
14. Sabaku no Yuki (砂漠の雪)

== Song list ==
=== I've solo works ===
- "Utsukushiku Ikitai" (美しく生きたい) (February 5, 1999)
- "Fall in Love" (September 24, 1999)
- "Suna no Kaze" (砂の風) (October 16, 1999)
- "Repeat" (October 16, 1999)
- "Fly to the Top" (July 16, 2000)
- "Kimi to Deaeta Kisetsu" (君と出会えた季節) (December 8, 2000)
- "Inori no Toki" (祈りの時代) (December 22, 2000)
- "Kanashimi no Hana" (悲しみの花) (January 26, 2001)
- "Sayonara o Oshiete" (さよならを教えて) -comment te dire adieu- (March 2, 2001)
- "World My Eyes -prototype-" (December 28, 2002)
- "Sabaku no Yuki" (砂漠の雪) (December 28, 2002)
- "Last in Blue" (February 28, 2003)
- "Spiral" (June 27, 2003)
- "Out Flow" (September 5, 2003)
- "Our Youthful Days" (October 31, 2003)
- "Permit" (December 17, 2004)
- "Permit" -Unplugged mix- (December 17, 2004)
- "Permit" -Yurushi no Toh (許しの塔, Yurushi no Tō)- (December 17, 2004)
- "Permit" -Yurushi no Toh (許しの塔, Yurushi no Tō)- Unplugged Mix (December 17, 2004)
- "Sabaku no Yuki" (砂漠の雪) (Mixed up ver.) (December 29, 2004)
- "Egen" (January 14, 2005)
- "Two face (Front Line Covers ver.)" (December 28, 2008)
- "Disintegration (Front Line Covers ver.)" (December 28, 2008)
- "Kara no Tsubomi" (殻の蕾) (March 25, 2009)
- "Bizarrerie Cage" (May 1, 2009)
- "Noblest Love" (February 26, 2010)

=== Mell and Miki ===
- "Sora Yori Chikai Yume" (空より近い夢) (July 14, 2000)

=== Kotoko and Mell ===
- "See You" -Chiisana Eien- (～小さな永遠～, -Chiisana Eien-) (June 14, 2006)

=== I've Special Unit ===
- "See You" -Chiisana Eien- (～小さな永遠～, -Chiisana Eien-) (P.V ver.) (September 5, 2003)
- "Fair Heaven" (July 30, 2005)
- "Tenjō o Kakeru Monotachi" (天壌を翔る者たち); performed as Love Planet Five (April 4, 2007)

=== Solo ===
- "Dear memories"
- "The Winner Takes It All"
- "Hello Goodbye" (Silent Half)
- "Mermaid"
- "Split" (...Split)
- "Video-Killed-The-Radio-Star"
- "Hoshi Meguri no Uta" (星めぐりの歌)
- "Strange Woman"
- "Noyau"
- "Mermaid in the City"
- "Fin"
- "Where Are You Now?"

=== Orihime ===
- "Are naga Ojisan My Dear" (アレながおじさん My Dear)
- "Are naga Ojisan My Dear Ura" (アレながおじさん My Dear 裏)
- "Love Generation"

=== Aki & Kotoko & Mell & Naraku & Yokko-Q ===
- "Sora Yori Chikai Yume" -Nara Q Mix- (空より近い夢 ～ならQ Mix～)

=== C.G Mix featuring Mell ===
- "Detect"
