= Proof/No Vain =

Single by Mell
- Released: May 30, 2007
- Recorded: 2007
- Genre: J-Pop
- Length: 23:06
- Label: Geneon
- Songwriter(s): Mell, Kazuya Takase (both songs)
- Producer(s): I've Sound

Mell singles chronology
"Red Fraction" (2006)	"Proof/No Vain" (2007)	"Virgin's High!/Kicks!" (2007)

"Proof/No Vain" is Mell's second single under Geneon Entertainment. "Proof" was used as the first ending theme for the anime series Hayate no Gotoku!. The single reached number 18 in the Oricon charts and sold a total of 13,000 copies.

== Track listing ==
No.	Title	Lyrics	Music	Length
1.	"Proof"	Mell	Kazuya Takase	5:33
2.	"no vain"	Mell	Kazuya Takase	6:00
3.	"Proof -Instrumental-"			5:33
4.	"no vain -Instrumental-"			5:58
Total length:				23:04
