= Rideback (song) =

"RIDEBACK"

Single by Mell
- Released: March 4, 2009
- Genre: J-pop
- Label: Geneon
- Songwriters: Mell, Kazuya Takase
- Producer: I've Sound

Mell singles chronology
"KILL" (2008)	"RIDEBACK" (2009)

"RIDEBACK" is the fifth single of I've Sound singer, Mell. It was released on March 4, 2009, which serves as the opening theme for the anime series Rideback. The single has a Japanese version, a remix version and the instrumental version of the title track in addition to the original English track.

The single came in a regular CD-only edition (GNCV-0016) and a limited CD+DVD edition (GNCV-0015) which contained the PV for RIDEBACK.

== Track listing ==
1. RIDEBACK
  Lyrics: Mell
  Composition/Arrangement: Kazuya Takase
2. RIDEBACK -Japanese ver.-
  Lyrics: Mell
  Composition/Arrangement: Kazuya Takase
3. RIDEBACK -Re-mix ver.-
  Lyrics: Mell
  Composition: Kazuya Takase
  Arrangement: Ken Morioka
4. RIDEBACK -instrumental-

== Sales trajectory ==
Mon	Tue	Wed	Thu	Fri	Sat	Sun	Week Rank	Sales	Total Sales
--	16	17	20	22	19	?	19	6,424	6,424
?	?	?	?	?	?	?	50	2,022	8,446
?	?	?	?	?	?	?	82	987	9,433
?	?	?	?	?	?	?	91	824	10,257
?	?	?	?	?	?	?	126	486	10,743
?	?	?	?	?	?	?	152	315	11,058
?	?	?	?	?	?	?	?	?	?
