= Red Fraction =

Single by Mell
- Released: June 14, 2006
- Genre: Industrial rock
- Length: 3:46
- Label: Geneon
- Songwriters: Kazuya Takase, Mell
- Producer: I've Sound

Mell singles chronology
"Red Fraction" (2006)	"'Proof/No Vain'" (2007)

"Red Fraction" is the first single of I've Sound singer Mell and her first single under Geneon Entertainment. Currently, this is Mell's most successful single as it reached #11 in the Oricon charts and sold a total of 38,006 copies. It was featured in the opening credits of the 2006 Japanese anime series Black Lagoon, produced by Madhouse and directed by Sunao Katabuchi.

== Track listing ==
1. Red Fraction—3:42
  Composition: Kazuya Takase
  Arrangement: Kazuya Takase
  Lyrics: Mell
2. Red Fraction (instrumental) – 3:41
3. Red Fraction (G.M.S remix) – 6:02
  Composition: Kazuya Takase
  Arrangement: G.M.S
  Lyrics: Mell
