= Black Lagoon (TV series) =

Japanese anime television series

- Also known as: List: Black Lagoon: The Second Barrage (S2); Black Lagoon: Roberta's Blood Trail (S3)
- Type: TV series (S1–2); OVA (S3)
- Genre: Crime; Girls with guns; Thriller
- Based on: Black Lagoon
- Created by: Rei Hiroe
- Directed by: Sunao Katabuchi
- Series composition: Sunao Katabuchi
- Character designer: Masanori Shino
- Music by: Edison
- Voices of: Daisuke Namikawa; Megumi Toyoguchi; Tsutomu Isobe; Hiroaki Hirata; Mami Koyama; Taiten Kusunoki
- Opening themes: "Red Fraction" by Mell (S1–2); "Red Fraction (IO Drive Mix)" by Mell (S3)
- Ending themes: List: "Don't Look Behind" by Edison (S1–2); "The World of Midnight" by Minako "Mooki" Obata (#15); "Peach Headz Addiction" by Breath Frequency (#24); "When Johnny Comes Marching Home" by Edison (S3); "This Moment: Prayer in the Light" by Minako "Mooki" Obata (#29)
- No. of seasons: 3 (Note: The Roberta's Blood Trail OVA series is officially recognized as the third season. As such, the parameters reflect this.)
- No. of episodes: 29 (list of episodes)

Production
- Art director: Hidetoshi Kaneko
- Sound director: Yasunori Honda
- Cinematographers: Yukihiro Masumoto (S1–2); Kenji Fujita (S3)
- Color designer: Yuriko Kadomoto
- Editor: Kashiko Kimura
- Animation producer: Ryōichirō Matsuo (S1–2)
- Studio: Madhouse
- Producers: Mitsutoshi Ogura; Junya Okamoto; Jun Nishimura (S1–2)
- Production companies: Black Lagoon Production Committee: Geneon Entertainment; Shogakukan; Geneon USA (S1–2)
- Runtime: 23 minutes (S1–2); 33–34 minutes (S3)

Original release
- Networks: Chiba TV (S1); Sendai Television (S2); Home video (S3)
- Release: April 9, 2006 – June 22, 2011

Black Lagoon (stylized in all caps) is a Japanese anime television series based on the manga series Black Lagoon by Rei Hiroe. It was animated by Madhouse and produced by Geneon Entertainment, Shogakukan and Geneon USA. The series was directed and written by Sunao Katabuchi, with Masanori Shino designing the characters and Edison composing the music. The first season was broadcast in Japan from April to June 2006; it was followed by a second season, subtitled The Second Barrage, which was broadcast from October to December of the same year.

A five-episode original video animation (OVA) series, subtitled Roberta's Blood Trail, was released from July 2010 to June 2011. It is officially recognized as the third season.

In North America, the anime series was originally licensed by Geneon USA in 2006. It was later acquired by Funimation (later Crunchyroll) in 2008 after the former's dissolution, with the company later licensing the OVAs and regionally releasing it in August 2013.

== Plot ==
Rokuro "Rock" Okajima is a 25-year-old Japanese salaryman employed by Asahi Industries in Tokyo during the mid-1990s. While on a business assignment, he is captured by the Lagoon Company, a crew of pirate mercenaries operating an Elco-type PT boat named Black Lagoon, which specializes in smuggling operations throughout Southeast Asia. The group consists of Dutch, an African-American veteran of the U.S. Navy who serves as the captain; Revy, a Chinese-American markswoman and the crew's primary combatant; and Benny, a Jewish-American mechanic and electronics expert who handles technical operations.

After his company disavows him, Rock chooses to remain with the Lagoon Company, adapting to their criminal lifestyle while maintaining his diplomatic demeanor and corporate skills. He assumes the role of negotiator and intermediary, providing the crew with a legitimate facade for their dealings. The group operates out of Roanapur, a fictional Thai port city that functions as a haven for criminals, including the yakuza, the Chinese triad, the Russian Bratva, the Italian mafia, and the Colombian cartel.

The Lagoon Company engages in various high-risk missions, frequently encountering violent confrontations with rival criminals, law enforcement, and other mercenary groups. Their operations span maritime smuggling, armed escorts, and illicit trade, often leading to large-scale firefights and tactical engagements across the region.

== Production ==
Sunao Katabuchi, the series director, was a fan of the original manga prior to the adaptation, citing its energy and dynamism as key attractions. Noting a shared appreciation for American novels with author Rei Hiroe, Katabuchi found common creative ground. Having previously directed the family-oriented film Princess Arete, Katabuchi stated that working on the mature-audience Black Lagoon was not fundamentally different, as he aimed to create material that resonates individually with each viewer. He and Hiroe bonded over a mutual interest in Stephen King and American gothic horror and action novels, which solidified their collaborative rapport.

Hiroe had minimal involvement in the anime's production to avoid impacting his manga schedule, entrusting Katabuchi and the staff with the adaptation. He prioritized preserving the series's spirit without constraining the director's vision. The adaptation retained the manga's violent content without dilution. Animation producer Ryoichiro Matsuo was instructed to emphasize gruesome depictions, with Katabuchi aiming for a visceral, "bloody" atmosphere. To ensure consistency in visual storytelling, Katabuchi held meetings to align the staff's vision for each episode.

Katabuchi introduced several original elements to the adaptation. These included expanded backstory for the salvaged U-boat crew and a car chase sequence during Roberta's pursuit of the Lagoon Company. A fight between Dutch and Roberta was added at Katabuchi's request. In the Hansel and Gretel arc, a scene was inserted where Rock embraces Gretel to symbolize his compassion for both twins, who cross-dress due to their multiple personalities. This storyline was Katabuchi's favorite, though concerns were raised regarding its perceived cruelty for television audiences.

Hiroe acknowledged the adaptation's narrative deviations but praised Katabuchi's skill in making the story concise and understandable. He noted that the anime conveyed certain story points more effectively than the manga, particularly through dialogue and vocal performance, which added emotional depth he had not initially envisioned. One of Katabuchi's favorite scenes was Roberta's combat sequence with an umbrella, which the staff dubbed "The Evil Mary Poppins"—syncing with Hiroe's original concept of a "Death Poppins" character.

The animation team researched firearms by handling real guns (without firing) to understand their weight and feel, as actual shooting was not possible. The U-boat depiction was designed to be highly realistic, exceeding the accuracy typically found in war films. The series's late 1990s setting was chosen to reflect the global instability following the Dissolution of the Soviet Union, providing a backdrop for the Russian mafia and other criminal elements.

Following The Second Barrage, Katabuchi expressed interest in producing more episodes but cited the extensive research and development time required, which mirrored Hiroe's meticulous process. Limited resources prevented an immediate continuation. Katabuchi planned to subsequently work on a children's project before eventually returning to Black Lagoon.

== Release ==
The series, which adapted eight story arcs from the original manga, was animated by Madhouse and produced by Geneon Entertainment, Shogakukan and Geneon USA. It was directed and written by Sunao Katabuchi, with Masanori Shino designing the characters. The series premiered for twelve episodes on Chiba TV from April 9 to June 25, 2006. A second season, subtitled The Second Barrage, premiered on Sendai Television from October 3 to December 19, 2006. Like the previous season, it too contained twelve episodes. Around a dozen additional terrestrial stations followed shortly thereafter for both seasons, including but not limited to Tokyo MX and KBC.

The first season was released on six DVDs, each containing two episodes, from July 26 to December 27, 2006. The second season mirrored this, being released from January 31 to July 27, 2007. Both seasons were re-released on a total of eight Blu-ray disc sets: the first season was released on four sets from December 23, 2009, to February 10, 2010; the second season was released on four sets from February 24 to March 25, 2010. The Blu-ray disc releases of both seasons included seven short comical omake specials produced from 2009 to 2010.

A five-episode original video animation (OVA), titled Black Lagoon: Roberta's Blood Trail, which covered the El Baile de la Muerte arc of the manga, was released from July 17, 2010, to June 22, 2011.

=== International release ===
In North America, Geneon USA announced the license to the series in July 2006. Geneon's North American dub was released on three DVD compilations, each containing four episodes, between May 22 and September 18, 2007. In September 2007, Geneon USA announced that they had ceased in-house distribution of its series. The English dub premiered on G4techTV Canada as part of its Anime Current programming block on October 26, 2007, and on Starz Edge as part of its Animidnight programming block on February 26, 2008. The Second Barrage premiered on G4techTV Canada on January 18, 2008.

On July 3, 2008, Geneon Entertainment and Funimation (later Crunchyroll) announced an agreement to distribute select titles in North America due to the former's American division being dissolved in September 2007. While Geneon would retain the master license to the titles its American branch lost, Funimation would assume exclusive rights to the manufacturing, marketing, sales and distribution of select titles. Black Lagoon was one of several titles involved in the deal. A box set of the entire first season was released on December 30, 2008. The Second Barrage was released on three DVDs from August 19 to October 28, 2008. At Anime Expo 2010, Funimation announced their licensing of the Roberta's Blood Trail OVA series, which was later released on August 6, 2013. The first and second seasons were re-released on a Blu-ray and DVD combo pack on December 4, 2012. Black Lagoon returned to American television on the Funimation Channel on February 15, 2013. The series aired on Adult Swim's Toonami programming block from March 23 to September 7, 2014. A Blu-ray collection of all 29 episodes was released on June 4, 2019. Following Sony's acquisition of Crunchyroll, series was moved over to the latter. The series was removed from the platform in July 2026.

In the United Kingdom, the series was first licensed by MVM Entertainment, which released the first two seasons across six DVDs between March 10, 2008, and January 5, 2009. The series was later acquired by Kazé UK with distribution handled by Manga Entertainment, and released the TV series on two Blu-ray sets in July 2012, and the OVA series in November 2013. In November 2020, Anime Limited announced that they had licensed the TV series and the OVA series, and subsequently re-released it on November 29, 2021.

== Music ==
The music of the series was composed by Edison. The original soundtrack album was released on August 30, 2006. The opening theme is "Red Fraction" by Mell and the ending theme is "Don't Look Behind" by Edison. Episode 15 features the ending theme "The World of Midnight" by Minako "Mooki" Obata, and episode 24 features the ending theme "Peach Headz Addiction" by Breath Frequency. The original soundtrack for the Roberta's Blood Trail OVA was included with the limited edition of the first Blu-ray Disc set, released on July 27, 2010. The opening theme for Roberta's Blood Trail is a remixed version of "Red Fraction", titled "Red Fraction (IO Drive Mix)", while the ending theme is an instrumental version of the American Civil War song "When Johnny Comes Marching Home". The last episode ending theme is "This Moment: Prayer in the Light" by Minako "Mooki" Obata.

Soundtrack
No.	Title	Length
1.	"Red Fraction (Opening version)"	1:32
2.	"Tear Drops to Earth"	1:26
3.	"Asian Comfort"	1:29
4.	"Don't Stop!"	4:25
5.	"Samara Samanda"	1:23
6.	"A Cold Wind in My Mind"	1:26
7.	"Make a Bet"	2:15
8.	"El Sol se Recuesta"	4:15
9.	"Seasonal Wind"	1:20
10.	"66 steps"	2:25
11.	"The World of Midnight"	1:48
12.	"Dark Side of the Moon"	2:06
13.	"Tadpole Dance"	1:32
14.	"Let Me Know Your Name"	4:17
15.	"After the Rain"	1:27
16.	"It's an Easy Afternoon"	1:24
17.	"Behind the Clouds"	1:36
18.	"The Anthem of the Aryan Socialist Union"	1:32
19.	"Melting Brain"	3:24
20.	"The Way to Last Night"	1:44
21.	"Peach Headz Addiction"	3:14
22.	"Don't Look Behind (Requiem version)"	2:06
23.	"Father's Chest"	1:58
24.	"Don't Let Me Join Now"	2:02
25.	"Foxy Doll"	2:07
26.	"Rock the Carnival"	2:53
27.	"Mad Club"	1:27
28.	"Don't Stop! (Guitar version)"	3:41
29.	"Don't Look Behind (Ending version)"	1:39

== Reception ==
=== First season ===
Tom Flinn of ICv2 described Black Lagoon as an earthbound version of Cowboy Bebop, praising its relentless action sequences and predicting North American success despite its niche appeal. Tasha Robinson of Sci Fi Weekly noted similarities to Cowboy Bebop in character dynamics and edgy animation, though criticized its slow narrative start. Serdar Yegulalp of About.com highlighted the series's character development and moral complexity, while warning about its extreme violence. Katherine Luther of the same publication praised its intense, fast-paced brutality.

Theron Martin of Anime News Network (ANN) contrasted its aggressive tone with Cowboy Bebop's more philosophical approach, praising its production values, but questioning its Western market potential. David F. Smith in Newtype USA commended its dark humor and sharp dialogue while noting uneven action sequences. Mark Thomas of Mania.com praised its unexpected moral depth and the central relationship between Rock and Revy.

Joseph Luster of Otaku USA highlighted the series's tonal contrast between frenetic action and melancholic endings. Chris Beveridge of AnimeOnDVD praised its effective execution of violent action tropes. Bradley Meek of THEM Anime Reviews praised its Hollywood-inspired aesthetic and consistent production quality.

=== The Second Barrage ===
Luther (About.com) noted the second season focused more on the Lagoon Company's jobs than character development, calling it darker yet still action-packed. Davey C. Jones (Active Anime) praised the season's intensified action and darker storytelling compared to the first season. Sandra Scholes from the same website highlighted the series's energetic violence and suspenseful storytelling.

Bryce Coulter (Mania.com) observed the season maintained the first's strengths while increasing action and plot complexity. Martin (ANN) praised the twins' arc for its writing and emotional impact, noting its appeal to viewers tolerant of dark content. Holly Ellingwood (Active Anime) described the twins' arc as more violent and bleak than previous episodes, with surprising emotional depth. Tasha Robinson (Sci Fi Weekly) compared its chaotic style to Kill Bill without a clear protagonist.

Christopher Homer (Mania.com) praised the disturbing yet compelling twins' arc and Revy/Rock's evolving dynamic. Homer also noted the second volume's improvement over the first season in character development. Beveridge (also writing for Mania.com) praised the final arc's intellectual depth and character complexity. Ellingwood highlighted the finale's emotional impact and memorable conclusion, while David F. Smith (IGN) found the finale disappointing with pacing issues.

=== Roberta's Blood Trail ===
Yegulalp (About.com) observed that the OVA exceeded the television series in absurd over-the-top action, with Roberta's near-invincibility becoming a recurring motif. While noting its extreme violence and morally ambiguous characters, Yegulalp praised its thoughtful execution and ability to manipulate audience sympathies. Ellingwood (Active Anime) praised the adaptation of her favorite manga arc, though noted the military confrontation scene was too brief while Roberta's psychological sequences were overly prolonged. She considered these minor flaws in an otherwise strong narrative.

Ard Vijn (Screen Anarchy) commended the OVA as both homage to and parody of action films, while maintaining series consistency. He declared it cemented Black Lagoon as a premier action anime. Homer (The Fandom Post) praised the OVA's blend of action and philosophical depth, though lamented reduced screen time for supporting characters like Dutch and Balalaika. Martin (ANN) noted the OVA's increased violence and strong character development, though found its philosophical digressions more distracting than in the television series. He ultimately deemed it a worthy franchise continuation.
