= Kamen no Maid Guy =

Japanese media franchise based on manga of the same name by Maruboro Akai

仮面のメイドガイ
- Genre: Comedy
- Manga
- Written by: Maruboro Akai
- Published by: Fujimi Shobo
- Magazine: Monthly Dragon Age
- Original run: November 9, 2004 – March 9, 2012
- Volumes: 15
- Anime television series
- Directed by: Masayuki Sakoi
- Written by: Kazuyuki Fudeyasu
- Music by: Kaoru Okubo
- Studio: Madhouse
- Licensed by: NA: Discotek Media
- Original network: AT-X
- Original run: April 5, 2008 – June 21, 2008
- Episodes: 12 + OVA

Kamen no Maid Guy (仮面のメイドガイ, Kamen no Meido Gai; lit. "The Masked Maid Guy") is a comedy manga series written and illustrated by Maruboro Akai. The manga started serialization in the Japanese shōnen manga magazine Monthly Dragon Age in 2004.

An anime adaptation directed by Masayuki Sakoi, and animated by Madhouse, aired between April and June 2008.

== Plot ==
Naeka Fujiwara is the granddaughter of a billionaire and the heir to his fortune. She is pursued by those who desire her inheritance. In order to protect her from harm and ensure her proper upbringing, the amazing and fearsome Kogarashi, the masked Maid Guy, is summoned.

== Characters ==
Naeka Fujiwara (富士原 なえか, Fujiwara Naeka)
Voiced by: Yuka Iguchi
The main protagonist. A student of Shuuhou Seiha Private School, ranked Fukushou (second-in-command) of the girl's kendo club and in line for a large inheritance. Naeka presents a unique challenge to Kogarashi; though attractive and extremely busty for her age (and the biggest of the manga. Only in a Kōsuke´s dream her position is in danger by Fubuki), Naeka speaks of walking the "path of the sword" like a warrior mainly to escape from her failed traumatic attempt at love where she accidentally poisoned her crush with a home-cooked bento. She is independent, stubborn, can be a lethal cook, not too bright and coarsely speaks her mind. Naeka suffers both friends and enemies for her figure and manners, and has to tolerate the demanding "service" of Kogarashi -- but through it all, she can still be upbeat and positive. She is depicted as a good swordswoman and will violently attack anyone who offends her with a live blade if necessary, including her own brother.
Kogarashi (コガラシ)
Voiced by: Rikiya Koyama
The title character. A towering, super-powered man in a maid uniform with facial features that includes a grin showing his sharp teeth and glowing eyes; he is also known for his sinister "Kukukukuku" laugh, most characters refer him as a "Bakemono" because of it. Kogarashi is boldly confident in his numerous Maid Guy abilities, from cooking & cleaning to USB connectivity and X-ray vision, even claiming to have 37 senses. He is extremely loyal to Naeka, but unafraid to criticize her faults. He also acts the same way towards his fellow maid, Fubuki. Ironically, Kogarashi himself lacks any regard for personal space or decency; hence, he is normally not depicted as pervert compared to other characters, usually brushing off the opposite sex as they were an animal implying he's clueless about women; because of it he is as much a source of problems for the Fujiwara home as he is the solution. Zenjurō even notes to Fubuki that using Kogarashi to protect her is like using poison to fight poison; Fubuki even tells Naeka to treat him as a beast. Despite being a kind person at heart (demonstrating helping various people in town with his master's permission), his mannerisms usually gets Naeka, as well as Fubuki, into unwanted trouble and humiliation, leading to the running gag of the series of him being beaten violently, yet comically, by Fubuki and/or Naeka. He states that he never gets sick and can almost instantly recover from injury but a whistle given to Naeka by Fubuki can hurt and possibly kill him, but it becomes broken in the beginning of the second episode (when Naeka slams it, accidentally, in her desk drawer).
Fubuki (フブキ)
Voiced by: Megumi Toyoguchi
A beautiful 19-year-old maid, who is also assigned to the Fujiwara household. She is tasked with both the Fujiwaras' daily care, and keeping Kogarashi under control. She has great skill as a maid and guardian, demonstrating ninja-like abilities; however, despite all of this, she is usually referred as a "clumsy maid" much to her annoyance, most of it coming from her fellow maid, Kogarashi. It's also implied in the anime she "disrobes when drunk", a habit she is quite aware of but tries to keep it secret. Fubuki is usually serious and calm, but is not above flattery and can be prideful at times. Both in the manga and anime, she is quite reserved about showing her attractive body (which includes a big bust ... despite the fact that Naeka´s breasts are still bigger), resulting in many admirers which includes Kosuke; and will quickly punish Kogarashi for his antics with a nail-studded baseball bat, kunai or any other weapon she carries in her arsenal. At one point is referred to as "the world's greatest maid guy tamer."
Kōsuke Fujiwara (富士原 幸助, Fujiwara Kōsuke)
Voiced by: Daisuke Sakaguchi
Naeka's overweight little brother, a fan of maids and eroge. He is good-natured, and has a normal sibling rivalry with Naeka. Kōsuke seems to get along best with his grandfather, and is very thankful for being bestowed with Fubuki. His otaku tendencies sometimes gets him into trouble with the others. When forced to diet, Kōsuke is shown to be very handsome.
Zenjurō Fujiwara (富士原 全重郎, Fujiwara Zenjurō)
Voiced by: Mugihito
Naeka and Kōsuke's wealthy and doting grandfather. Concerned that both his family line is in danger, and his surviving grandchildren might disgrace them, Zenjurō hires the two maids to ensure their safety, as well as the Fujiwara fortune. He commissioned an expensive lounge just to watch his granddaughter's kendo match and closed school for a day, showing the kind of vast influence their family has. He also genuinely loves his grandchildren and even was ready to have an ambassador and his son deported or arrested for spying and did not care if it became an international incident all because the ambassador's son groped Naeka's butt.
Eiko Izumi (和泉 英子, Izumi Eiko)
Voiced by: Emiri Katō
Naeka's friend and fellow teammate in the kendo club. They are usually seen eating lunch together or at practice with Miwa. Eiko is usually the first to yell at her busty classmate for her shallow or selfish comments. She is highly envious of Naeka's bust size and whenever she gets annoyed by Naeka's comments she commonly assaults her friend by groping her breasts. Her desire for bigger breasts is such that she willingly becomes Urashima Taro's mind controlled slave in exchange for him using his powers to enlarge her bust size. At the same time, Eiko does enjoy her friendship with Naeka, scheming for their kendo club, wanting in on the latest gossip, or needing help with the maid cafe where she and Miwa works.
Miwa Hirano (平野 美和, Hirano Miwa)
Voiced by: Yu Kobayashi
A friend and classmate to Naeka. A boyish, short-haired and more rational member of the kendo club, Miwa is a decently performing student. Though she sometimes comes off as insensitive to her friend, she does not deny Naeka's skillful swordsmanship and determination. She works with Eiko at the maid cafe "D'erlanger", that holds a rivalry with a neighboring shop.
Male Kendo Club
Three boys from Shūhō Seiha Private School who show up randomly throughout the series. They are an unwelcome sight to Naeka, as they loudly and openly proclaim their love for her generous bust. In the anime, they are not referred to by name, though they do address their "Leader" as such. In the anime during a time when the "Leader" lost his memory, he revealed that he only likes Naeka's breasts because they are Naeka's and shown when he had no reaction towards other women with large breasts, hinting at him having deeper feelings for her then just parts love. However, he later was hit in the head again, causing him to forget the entire time he was with Naeka.
Saki Tabaruzaka (田原坂 沙希, Tabaruzaka Saki)
Voiced by: Yuko Kaida
Saki is another girl attending Shūhō Seiha Private School, who is in love with Naeka. She is so obsessed, she jealously attacks anyone else who attempts peek at Naeka before she does. Saki's efforts are sometimes thwarted by Kogarashi, though he refuses to harm her directly. So far, no character has referred to Saki by name in the anime.
Maguro Uomatsu
Voiced by: Shiro Saito
An omnipresent fish market salesman, both in the manga and anime. Uomatsu seldom interacts with the cast directly, but does acknowledge Kogarashi's superiority and usefulness at times.
Elizabeth K. Strawberryfield (エリザベス·K·ストロベリーフィールド, Erizabesu K Sutoroberīfīrudo)
Voiced by: Saki Fujita
Introducing herself as "Liz", she is a transfer student to Shūhō Seiha Private School. A thirteen-year-old child prodigy of English descent, Liz is extremely wealthy herself, a remarkable kendo student and immediately treats Naeka as her rival. Liz takes every opportunity and resource available to humiliate Naeka, displaying a mildly unsettling foot fetish (which is never focused on in the anime). She takes on the persona of "Strawberry Mask" as a disguise, even though everyone can easily tell who she is. In the anime, after her encounter with Kogarashi, she became deathly afraid of crows to the point she wets her bed.
Shizuku & Tsurara (シズク & ツララ)
Voiced by: Akemi Kanda (Shizuku), and Hiroe Oka (Tsurara)
Twin ninja maids who serve Liz, much like the Maid Guy & Fubuki. They are also underlings of Hyochuka the Masked Woman. Although both are twenty-one years of age, Shizuku is the more youthful of the two. She has a tendency to speak out of turn to others, getting her into trouble often. Tsurara is the mature twin, upholding very strict codes of secrecy, infiltration and discipline. However, her dour attitude and voice makes her seem much older, ruining her disguises. Shizuku is usually equipped with a pair of large kunai, while her sister Tsurara wields a kusarigama.
Hendrick Strawberryfield (ヘンドリック·ストロベリーフィールド, Hendorikku Sutoroberīfīrudo)
An unapologetic and shallow young man, fixated on large breasts to the point he will greet women by addressing their breasts. Hendrick uses a hypnotic effect from his eyes to command girls, who then willingly do and say anything to please him. He also has his family's wealth to exploit, but he is often the victim of his own single-minded lust. This fixation led to his younger sister Liz's inferiority complex because of her brother complex, where she despises any girl with large breasts (thus her distaste for Naeka).
Yoshie Arayashiki (荒屋敷 吉江, Arayashiki Yoshie)
Voiced by: Mayumi Yamaguchi
A huge and brazen student from Shugendō High School, another rival to Naeka, who constantly challenges her every chance she gets. Arayashiki is utterly consumed with a need for revenge, after an embarrassing match with Naeka where the results left her disrobed (to the horror of the audience). Naeka fears having to risk Arayashiki's wrath and suffer the same humiliation, but Kogarashi does intervene when the situation gets out of hand. She is an extremely large muscular woman with a violent temper, a temper that usually gets her into trouble causing her to lose against Naeka.
Kofujiwara Wabisuke (侘助小藤原, Wabisuke Kofujiwara)
The lowest rung successor of the inheritance and deemed a rival to Naeka; however, the majority does not take him seriously. He is usually referred as a self-styled secondary inheritor with an avant-garde style, including a strange hairstyle; due to that Kogarashi quickly detects, correctly, a twisted ambition from him. He is one of those who has sent an assassin after Naeka; in this case, his own maid Hyochuka. It is implied that after gaining the inheritance, he wants to rule the world.
Hyochuka (ヒョウチュカ, Hyochuka)
Also known as The Masked Woman, is Kofujiwara's maid, whose strength and cunning is equal to both Kogarashi and Fubuki. The mask she wears is similar to Kogarashi's mask. She had threatened Naeka's grandfather and almost succeeds in killing Kogarashi using a fake whistle that's similar to what Fubuki gave Naeka. Shizuku & Tsurara, Liz's maids, are some of her underlings who aid her in missions. The rest of her underlings are just mechanical puppets she controls and uses in battle. She can also cloak herself to avoid detection and escape. Her main objective is the assassination of Naeka, so Kofujiwara can get the inheritance.
Arashi of Everlasting Youth (常若のアラシ, Eikyū no Arashi)
Introduced in volume five of the manga series, she is Fubuki's very youthful and attractive grandmother. She holds the title of "Maid Master" of the academy where presumably Fubuki and other maids undergo rigorous training. Arashi maintains a pleasant and playful facade, but can be temperamental, rough with discipline, and especially violent if she's called old. Shockingly, she and Zenjurō are a mutually romantic couple. Arashi is exclusive to the manga, with no appearances or references in the anime series.(she does appear with a patch over her eye at the end of episode 12, but she is unnamed and could be a sister or relative that looks like Fubuki).
Urashima Taro (浦島 太郎, Urashima Tarō)
The perverted, breast obsessed spirit of an ancient fisherman who lives in a deserted island. He is introduced in the later manga episodes, where it's revealed that while living he offended a big breasted goddess by gawking at her and in retaliation she sealed his spirit to a deserted island where he would never be able to look at breasts again. On his first appearance, when the main cast vacation on his island, he attempts to hypnotize the women and turn them into his big-boobed mistresses; he succeeds in controlling Miwa, Eiko and Fubuki but is beaten in combat by Naeka. After that he becomes obsessed with Naeka and he makes several attempts to enslave her, on one occasion he succeeds and temporarily turns her into his slave-girl. He has the ability to set up complex traps with fishing lines and hooks, the ability to hypnotize and possess people, the ability to make his body magnetic to women's breasts and the ability to enlarge women's breasts.

== Anime episodes ==
No.	Title	Original release date
1	"Nice To Meet You, Master!"; Transliteration: "Hajimemashite da, Goshujin-sama!" (Japanese: はじめましてだ、ご主人!)	April 5, 2008
Naeka is a seventeen-year-old girl who will inherit a large fortune when she turns eighteen, however, many people might try to assassinate her and take the fortune, so her rich grandfather sends two maids, Kogarashi and Fubuki to act as her and her brother's bodyguards.
2	"Expert Of Loving Huge Breasts"; Transliteration: "Hakase no Ai Shita Kyonyū" (Japanese: 博士の愛した巨乳)	April 12, 2008
When Naeka discovers that the reason she's failing math is because her enormous breasts are taking away nutrients from her brain, she, her brother, Fubuki and Kogarashi try to find different ways of making her chest flatter.
3	"The Romance Doesn't Stop?"; Transliteration: "Romantikku ga Tomaranai?" (Japanese: ロマンティックが止まらない?)	April 19, 2008
When sword-passionate Naeka receives a love letter, she’s convinced she doesn’t care. However, Kogarashi reveals that despite her last horrible experience with poisoning her first crush, she hasn’t given up on romance. Kogarashi, Fubuki, and Kosuke pitch in to rebuild Naeka’s confidence and soon she’s overcome with feelings of love. When the meeting finally arrives, the sender turns out to be a female, but Kogarashi insists that Naeka “move forward” anyway. Later that night, after escaping the other girl, Naeka reaffirms her passion for swords with Kogarashi as her target..
4	"Thong and Big Breasts"; Transliteration: "Himo to Boin" (Japanese: ヒモとボイン)	April 26, 2008
When a group of underwear thieves steal Naeka's panties, it's up to Kogarashi to recover them. Meanwhile, a new girl, Elizabeth K. Strawberryfield, joins Naeka's class and tries to beat Naeka at everything she does.
5	"Maid Ninpou, High School Girl Technique"; Transliteration: "Meido Ninpō, Joshikōsei no Jutsu" (Japanese: メイド忍法 女子高生の術)	May 3, 2008
Naeka and Elizabeth keep competing in everything. Kogarashi and Fubuki detect several bugs and spy cameras placed around the house and have to find out who placed them and try to stop them from placing more.
6	"Clumsy Maid Girl Doesn't Look Back"; Transliteration: "Dojikko Meido wa Furimukanai" (Japanese: ドジッ娘メイドは振り向かない)	May 10, 2008
After Kogarashi, lacking much moral skill, bothers Naeka about her small but constant weight gain, Naeka snaps and goes into an extreme diet, dragging Fubuki into it along the way. But soon enough, Naeka's diet methods get out of hand.
7	"Naeka's Sword. Kurama Mountain Training Chapter"; Transliteration: "Naeka no Ken. Kuramayama Shūgyō Hen" (Japanese: なえかの剣 鞍馬山修行編)	May 17, 2008
Naeka prepares for the upcoming kendo tournament and is helped in training by her brother, Fubuki, and Kogarashi. However, the odds are against her when she is fixed against a huge adversary and when Elizabeth tries to sabotage her fights.
8	"That Name Is Extraordinary! Strawberry Mask"; Transliteration: "Sono Nao wa Kaiketsu! Ichigo Kamen" (Japanese: その名は怪傑!いちご仮面)	May 24, 2008
Elizabeth's brother, Hendrick, who has the ability to hypnotize women when they look into his eyes, wants to marry Naeka because of her fortune and huge breasts. However, Elizabeth, not wanting her brother to marry her nemesis, disguises herself as the Strawberry Mask (even though people know who she is) to try to stop Hendrick from making Naeka fall in love with him because she actually wants him for herself.
9	"Sweet Service, In The Middle Of Cleavage"; Transliteration: "Amai go Hōshi Tanima no Naka ni" (Japanese: 甘いご奉仕 谷間の中に)	May 31, 2008
Naeka's friends, Eiko and Miwa, ask Kogarashi to bake cake for the cake shop they work in, since their depressed cook can't cook anymore. Eiko and Miwa also ask Naeka and Fubuki, who have D-cup breasts, to infiltrate their cake shop's rival shop, which has terrible cakes, but all waitresses have huge D-cup breasts. Fubuki, not wanting to wear the shop's revealing uniform, flees and tries to hide from Naeka. It's revealed that the owner of the shop, and all of the waitresses, have had breast enhancement surgery to achieve this, which Naeka and Fubuki exposes at the end.
10	"Aim For Fine"; Transliteration: "Fain wo Nerae!" (Japanese: ファインをねらえ!)	June 7, 2008
Seeking to pass a math test, Naeka and the maids travel to a temple where a God grants wishes to those who please him. There she finds only women are allowed inside and this God is also a pervert who likes breasts and panties, and a psychic (revealing Fubuki takes off her clothes when drunk, and Elizabeth wets her bed when she has nightmares about crows). His prophet makes Naeka and Fubuki compete against Elizabeth and the bear-like Kendo opponent whom Fujiwara humiliated earlier, in a tennis competition where the winner would get her wish, however the rules are made up by the God as they go along.
11	"A Midsummer Night's Breasts"; Transliteration: "Manatsu no Yoru no Chichi" (Japanese: 真夏の夜の乳)	June 14, 2008
When the president of the Naeka's Boob fan club loses his memory due to massive head trauma (caused accidentally by Naeka), only being around her breasts makes him remember things. Kogarashi and Naeka's friends embark on a plot to send the two on a date so he will regain his memory by being around her more. Naeka is obviously unhappy with this and must restrain herself from violently hurting him on their date. However over time, she can't help but feel something for him.
12	"Farewell, Dear Maid Guy"; Transliteration: "Saraba Itoshiki Meidogai" (Japanese: さらば愛しきメイドガイ)	June 21, 2008
In the conclusion of season 1, Kogarashi and Fubuki battle a female Masked Maid with shark teeth and powers rivaling Kogarashi, hired to assassinate Naeka. This maid, hired by a wealthy man attending Naeka's Grandfather's 70th birthday party, appears to be of the same clan as Kogarashi and reveals him to be hundreds of years old. The ending sets up the plot of season two which has yet to be announced.
13 (OVA)	"Summer and a Lot of Breasts"; Transliteration: "Natsu to mune no ōku" (Japanese: 夏と胸の多く)	December 22, 2008
In the OVA, Naeka, Kosuke, Eiko, Miwa, Kogarashi and Fubuki go on a vacation to a deserted beach island to relax. However, relaxation is the last thing they get when they awaken the ancient immortal spirit of a fisherman who is obsessed with breasts and plans to kidnap Naeka, Eiko, Miwa and Fubuki to hypnotize them and turn them into his big boobed slaves.
