= Re:Creators =

Japanese anime television series

- Main visual
- Genre: Action; Reverse isekai
- Created by: Rei Hiroe
- Developed by: Ei Aoki; Rei Hiroe
- Directed by: Ei Aoki
- Music by: Hiroyuki Sawano
- Country of origin: Japan
- Original language: Japanese
- No. of episodes: 22

Production
- Producer: Shizuka Kurosaki
- Animator: Troyca
- Production companies: Shogakukan; Aniplex; ABC Animation

Original release
- Network: Tokyo MX, BS11, GYT, GTV, ABC TV, TVA, AT-X
- Release: April 8 – September 16, 2017

Related
- Manga
- Written by: Daiki Kase
- Published by: Shogakukan
- Imprint: Sunday GX Comics
- Magazine: Monthly Sunday Gene-X
- Original run: April 19, 2017 – November 19, 2019
- Volumes: 6
- Manga

Re:Creators One More!
- Written by: Yūki Kumagai
- Published by: Shogakukan
- Imprint: Shōnen Sunday Comics Special
- Magazine: Monthly Shōnen Sunday
- Original run: June 12, 2017 – November 10, 2017
- Volumes: 1
- Manga

Chikujōin-san Hashagisugi
- Written by: Tatsuhiko Ida
- Published by: Shogakukan
- Magazine: Sunday Webry
- Original run: August 6, 2017 – November 5, 2017
- Volumes: 1

Re:Creators (stylized as Re:CREATORS) is a Japanese anime television series produced by Troyca. The series is about a high school student who becomes involved in a battle between several characters from manga, anime, and video games who somehow manifest in the real world. It aired from April to September 2017 and was exclusively streamed on Amazon Prime Video. A manga adaptation by Daiki Kase was serialized in Shogakukan's Monthly Sunday Gene-X from April 2017 to November 2019.

== Plot ==
Sōta Mizushino is a young high school student and an avid anime fan who dreams of writing his own light novel. While watching the anime adaptation of the mecha light novel Elemental Symphony of Vogelchevalier to look for inspiration, the tablet computer he is watching on sputters and drags him into the anime's world, where he witnesses a battle between the anime's character Selesia and a mysterious girl wearing a military uniform. After returning with Selesia, Sōta discovers that other characters from different stories and forms of media were also brought to the real world, with some of them aligned with the military uniform princess, who promised them ways to end the strife in their worlds and a way back home, unaware of her true intentions. To stop her, Sōta and Selesia agree to find the other characters and bring them home, lest the military uniform princess bring untold destruction to every world that exists.

== Characters ==
=== Main ===
Sōta Mizushino (水篠 颯太, Mizushino Sōta)
Voiced by: Daiki Yamashita
A 16-year old high school student who is timid but good-natured. He aspires to write his own light novel, but struggles to draw. He was friends with Altair's creator, Setsuna until he got jealous of her because of how everyone liked her due to her superior drawing skills while his mostly went ignored. Because of this, he brushed her off when she was accused of plagiarism and even felt satisfaction in her suffering. However, after learning of her suicide, he was left traumatized with self-loathing. As a result, upon learning Altair's true identity, he initially kept this a secret from the others, unable to face his demons. However, he eventually pulls through and resolves to stop Altair to atone for his actions.
Altair (アルタイル, Arutairu)
Voiced by: Aki Toyosaki
A mysterious, nihilistic young girl initially known as the Military Uniform Princess (軍服の姫君, Gunpuku no Himegimi) who brought the other creations into the real world. While she claimed to do this to force their creators to alter their worlds, she actually aims to destroy the real world out of spite over the death of her own creator. It is eventually revealed that she originated from the music video Altair: World Étude. Being a creation without a story, she is able to adopt powers from fan-fictions about her; she calls this ability "Holopsicon". However, overusing these abilities will cause her to fade from the real world, though she can bypass this by getting her viewers' approval.
Selesia Upitiria (セレジア・ユピティリア, Serejia Yupitiria)
Voiced by: Mikako Komatsu
The main female protagonist of the anime Elemental Symphony of Vogelchevalier (精霊機想曲フォーゲルシュバリエ, Seireikisōkyoku Fōgerushubarie). She is a princess and a knight who, alongside her partner Charon, fights the series' antagonists. She uses a sword and is capable of flight. She also owns a mecha called Vogelchevalier and later temporarily gained the ability to use fire magic. Upon arriving in the real world, she initially struggled to cope with the revelation that she is a creation, but quickly came to terms with it. She retains her strong morals and drive in the real world, striving to stop Altair and protect the creators.
Meteora Österreich (メテオラ・エスターライヒ, Meteora Esutāraihi)
Voiced by: Inori Minase, Sayaka Ohara (delusion; ep. 13)
An NPC from the open world RPG Avalken of Reminisce (追憶のアヴァルケン, Tsuioku no Avaruken). Though stoic, Meteora is a strong-willed tactician that works to protect the creators, as she believes her game was created well. Meteora normally fights with her tome, but her true strength is in tactics and planning. Upon arriving in the real world, she becomes the tactical leader of Sōta's group.

=== Creations ===
Creations (被造物, Hizōbutsu) are fictional characters that are taken out from various forms of 2D entertainment such as anime, manga, light novels, and video games by the "Military Uniform Princess". Much like in their respective worlds, they are able to use their own powers, making them unbalanced with normal humans in the real world. Characters that can be taken out are those who receive approval and 'enough' popularity from their readers and viewers.

Mamika Kirameki (煌樹 まみか, Kirameki Mamika)
Voiced by: Rie Murakawa
The main protagonist of the magical girl anime series Magical Slayer Mamika (マジカルスレイヤー・まみか, Majikaru Sureiyā Mamika). Being from a series aimed at children, she was initially very naive, quickly resorting to violence if others do not agree with her. However, she eventually realizes the hypocrisy in her actions. While initially a supporter of Altair, she turns against her after discovering her true motives. She was the only creation whose creator was never revealed nor introduced in the series.
Yūya Mirokuji (弥勒寺 優夜, Mirokuji Yūya)
Voiced by: Kenichi Suzumura
The main antagonist of the Lockout Ward Underground -Dark Night- (閉鎖区underground-dark night-, Heisaku Underground – dark night -) action manga. He was once the best friend of the protagonist, Shō, until he supposedly killed their friend and Shō's sister. In reality, however, he was set up by the true culprit. Afterward, he became a gang-boss in a lawless Adachi. He uses a bokken called "Kuronagimaru" that can produce gusts of air and can summon a spirit called an "Astral Double" named "Hangaku" to fight by his side. Upon arriving in the real world, he desires to fight strong opponents, which prompts him to join Sōta's group.
Alicetaria February (アリステリア・フェブラリィ, Arisuteria Feburarī)
Voiced by: Yōko Hikasa
The protagonist of the fantasy epic manga and anime franchise Alicetaria of the Scarlet (緋色のアリステリア, Hiiro no Arisuteria). She is a princess and a knight who constantly fights a losing battle against the series' antagonists. She fights using a lance and uses magic through her "Gauntlet of Götz von Berlichingen". She also rides on a pegasus. Upon arriving in the real world, she gained an intense hatred of her creator, Gai, for making her world into such a dark setting for the sake of "entertainment" and suffered from a mild identity crisis upon learning that she is a creation. She desired to use the creators' power to save her world and fell into denial upon learning that this is impossible. She is aligned with Altair, due to her desire to change her world.
Blitz Talker (ブリッツ・トーカー, Burittsu Tōkā)
Voiced by: Atsushi Ono
A secondary character from the cyberpunk anime and manga Code・Babylon. He is the partner of the protagonist and works for the "Flashlight Detective Office", which hunts monsters. He uses a gun and a watch that allows him to fly. He also possesses special bullets called "Gravity Bombs". Upon arriving in the real world, he sides with Altair because she resembles his deceased daughter, Erina, and to get revenge on his creator, Shunma, for killing her.
Rui Kanoya (鹿屋 瑠偉, Kanoya Rui)
Voiced by: Sora Amamiya
The main protagonist of the mecha anime Infinite Divine Machine Mono Magia (無限神機モノマギア, Mugen Shinki Mono Magia) who protects the series' futuristic setting from the antagonists. While normally pretty energetic, he also gets whiny easily. He pilots the giant robot "Gigas Machina", which is equipped with a huge arsenal of futuristic weapons. After coming to the real world and learning that he is a creation, he is not dismayed and even comes to take pride in it. He joins Sōta's group because they are the first faction he meets.
Magane Chikujōin (築城院 真鍳, Chikujōin Magane)
Voiced by: Maaya Sakamoto
An antagonist from the light novel and anime series Record of the Night Window Demon (夜窓鬼録, Yasōkiroku). While putting on the guise of an energetic high school student, she is really a psychotic murderer who killed her entire school. She possesses an ability called "Infinite Deception of Words" that allows her to bend reality through lies; Upon arriving in the real world, she does not join either Sōta's or Altair's faction and causes trouble for both sides.
Hikayu Hoshikawa (星河 ひかゆ, Hoshikawa Hikayu)
Voiced by: Shiina Natsukawa
A heroine from the all-ages version of adult dating sim game The Milky Way of a Starry Sky (ほしぞら☆ミルキーウェイ, Hoshizora☆Mirukīwei). She is found by Selesia and Rui. As she has no fighting powers at all, her creator comes up with the idea of creating a fan disk to give her some. As a result, she fights using a Nunchaku and monstrous strength, and calls herself "Extreme Final Legend Martial Artist", even though she is embarrassed over it. She aligns herself with Sōta's group, and works to return to her world.
Shō Hakua (白亜 翔, Hakua Shō)
Voiced by: Nobuhiko Okamoto
The main protagonist of the Lockout Ward Underground -Dark Night- (閉鎖区underground-dark night-, Heisaku Underground – dark night -) action manga. He was once the best friend of the series' antagonist, Yūya, until the latter supposedly killed their friend and his sister. Afterwards, he was granted a spirit called an "Astral Double" named "Bayard" by a fortuneteller to take revenge on Yūya. He fights using a retractable three-section staff and can summon "Bayard" to fight by his side. "Bayard" can also attack using reflections. Upon arriving in the real world, he allies himself with Altair because she is Yūya's enemy.
Erina Talker (エリナ・トーカー, Erina Tōkā)
Voiced by: Manaka Iwami
A supporting character from the cyberpunk anime and manga Code・Babylon. She is Blitz' daughter. At some point in the story, she was abducted by an antagonist and fused to a portal that would unleash monsters into the world, forcing Blitz to kill her.
Charon Seiga (カロン・セイガ, Karon Seiga)
Voiced by: Daisuke Ono
The main male protagonist of the Elemental Symphony of Vogelchevalier (精霊機想曲フォーゲルシュバリエ, Seireikisōkyoku Fōgerushubarie) light novel series. He is a knight who, alongside his partner Selesia, fights against the series' antagonists. However, as the series progressed, his resolve wavered. He fights using a sword and pilots a darker version of "Vogelchevalier". Upon arriving in the real world and learning that he is a creation, he fell into despair and allied himself with Altair to use the creators' power to save his world.

=== Creators ===
Creators (創造主, Sōzōshu) are people who created the Creations. They can be the scenario writer, character designer, planner, or the author of their respective series. They are able to 'upgrade' their respective characters if they receive enough positive responses and approval from their readers, fans and viewers.

Setsuna Shimazaki (シマザキ セツナ, Shimazaki Setsuna) / Yuna Shimazaki (島崎 由那, Shimazaki Yuna) (real name)
Voiced by: Ayaka Ōhashi
The creator of the online video called Altair: World Étude, from which Altair originated. She was originally an amateur manga artist, and upon being noticed by the community, became a more well known name. She befriends Sōta in middle school before her drawings get noticed, but they drift apart after she gains recognition.
Takashi Matsubara (松原 祟, Matsubara Takashi) / Takeshi Ōsawa (大沢 武志, Ōsawa Takeshi) (real name)
Voiced by: Katsuyuki Konishi
The author of the light novel Elemental Symphony of Vogelchevalier. While he and Selesia initially clashed over his attitude towards her, he has developed a greater sense of respect for her, and began to care for her just like his own daughter.
Marine (まりね) / Ayano Kōura (皇浦 綾乃, Kōura Ayano) (real name)
Voiced by: Hisako Kanemoto
The illustrator of the light novel Elemental Symphony of Vogelchevalier. She takes custody of Selesia and Meteora since Sōta could not continue to provide for them. She is actually rather insecure about her own illustrations, believing them to be inferior to those of other great illustrators. However, she uses this insecurity as resolve to continue to improve her drawing skills.
Masaaki Nakanogane (中乃鐘 昌明, Nakanogane Masaaki)
Voiced by: Ryō Sugisaki
The screenplay and scenario writer of the mecha anime Infinite Divine Machine Mono Magia. He initially finds Rui when watching his anime. He later heads the writing along with Takashi for the government plan.
Shunma Suruga (駿河 駿馬, Suruga Shunma) / Chika Ōsawa (大沢 智加, Ōsawa Chika) (real name)
Voiced by: Minako Kotobuki
The author of manga series Code・Babylon who speaks in Kansai dialect and with a chill attitude. She is often mistaken as a man due to her pen name and art style. As a result of a history of having her stories rejected by her audience, she has grown very cynical towards the entertainment industry. This also causes her to be willing to go very far to make sure her stories remain interesting, even if it means killing off her own characters in horrible ways.
Ryō Yatōji (八頭司 遼, Yatōji Ryō) / Ryōsuke Gōda (合田 亮介, Gōda Ryōsuke) (real name)
Voiced by: Daiki Hamano
The author of manga series Lockout Ward Underground -Dark Night-. Despite his abrasive personality, he actually cares about other people, and is thus labeled a tsundere by Suruga.
Gai Takarada (高良田 概, Takarada Gai) / Naoya Takarada (宝田 直也, Takarada Naoya) (real name)
Voiced by: Jun'ichi Yanagita
The author of manga series Alicetaria of the Scarlet. He was locked away by Alicetaria out of her anger towards him (due to the fact that her cruel world is just entertainment) until Sōta expressed his feelings towards her story. After being released by Alicetaria, he joins the effort to defeat Altair.
Nishio Ōnishi (大西 にしお, Ōnishi Nishio)
Voiced by: Jun Fukushima
The writer of The Milky Way of a Starry Sky, who belongs to the company Hyper Tension and is an old friend of Masaaki's. He is a huge otaku and a pervert who falls in love with his own creation.
Aki Kikuchihara (菊地原 亜希, Kikuchihara Aki)
Voiced by: Ayumi Tsunematsu
The General Coordinator Officer for the Situations Countermeasures Council, who is in charge of responding to the characters appearing in the real world. After the events of the series, she resigns from her government job and becomes a Creator herself.
Nobuyuki Sakamoto (坂本 宣之, Sakamoto Nobuyuki)
The planner of Avalken of Reminisce, who died due to a car accident prior to the story, but his name was never mentioned in the series (Episode 4 only reveals his occupation and autopsy report, without stating his name).
Tenkyū Kurakuma (鞍隈 天球, Kurakuma Tenkyū)
Author of the light novel Record of the Night Window Demon, he was killed by Magane for unknown motive and reason.

== Media ==
=== Anime ===
The series' original concept is by Rei Hiroe and directed by Ei Aoki. Hiroe provided the original character designs, Ryuichi Makino provided the adapted character designs and Hiroyuki Sawano composed the music for the anime. Hiroe's original story for the anime was published on Shogakukan's Sunday Webry website, under the title Re:Creators Naked. The series aired in Japan from April 8 to September 16, 2017, on Tokyo MX and other television networks, and was simulcast exclusively on Amazon's Amazon Video service. The first opening theme is "gravityWall" by SawanoHiroyuki[nZk]:Tielle & Gemie, and the ending theme song is "NewLook" by Mashiro Ayano. The second opening theme is "sh0ut" by SawanoHiroyuki[nZk]:Tielle & Gemie, and the ending theme song is "Rubicon" (ルビコン, Rubikon) by Sangatsu no Phantasia. Episode 13 features an ending song by Aki Toyosaki under her character name Altair titled "World Étude". The anime ran for 22 episodes with 3 special programs.

No.	Title (Note: All English titles are taken from Amazon Video.)	Original release date
1	"The Wonderful Voyage I will remember everything that happened to me." Transliteration: "Subarashiki Kōkai" (Japanese: 素晴らしき航海 I will remember everything that happened to me.)	April 8, 2017
One evening, Sōta Mizushino, a high school student struggling to draw, watches his favorite anime series, Elemental Symphony of Vogelchevalier on his tablet. Just then, a strange glitch happens and Sōta is transported to the anime's world, where the lead character, Selesia Upitiria, is battling against a mysterious girl known only as the Military Uniform Princess. Narrowly escaping from the battle, Sōta returns to the real world alongside Selesia, who becomes confused when Sōta tells her she is a fictional character. The Military Uniform Princess also arrives in the real world and pursues Sōta and Selesia, but she retreats after another fictional character, Meteora Österreich from the video game Avalken of Reminisce, appears as well.
2	"Dynamite and Cool Guy ...... that wasn't funny." Transliteration: "Dainamaito to Kūru Gai" (Japanese: ダイナマイトとクールガイ ...... that wasn't funny.)	April 15, 2017
Meteora explains how the Military Uniform Princess transported her and Selesia, along with other fictional characters, to the world where their worlds were created with the intent of overthrowing their creators and having them rewrite their worlds. As Selesia requests to meet her own creator, Sōta arranges her to meet with the Vogelchevalier light novel's author, Takashi Matsubara, who is understandably confused by the situation. Just then, the group is attacked by Mamika Kirameki, a character from the magical girl anime series Magical Slayer Mamika, who is siding with the Military Uniform Princess to try and improve her world. While getting the upper hand against Selesia, Mamika is shocked to learn of the pain and damage her attacks cause outside of her own world. In her denial, Mamika launches a powerful magic attack at Selesia, but it is blocked by Yūya Mirokuji, the antagonist of the Exclusive Underground: Dark Night manga series.
3	"The Extraordinary Ordinary Everyday Life Don't worry about what others said. Just be yourself." Transliteration: "Heibon ni Shite Hibon'naru Nichijō" (Japanese: 平凡にして非凡なる日常 Don't worry about what others said. Just be yourself.)	April 22, 2017
Before Yūya can battle against Mamika, Alicetaria February, a secondary character from Alicetaria of the Scarlet, arrives at the scene and escapes with Mamika. Sharing what he knows with the others, Yūya states that he has no interest in altering his world and goes off on his own. Later that night, as Meteora proposes that they test whether or not a creation's world can actually be changed, Takashi calls over Vogelchevalier's illustrator, Marine, to see if altering Selesia's backstory will have any effect on Selesia herself. They create a character description and illustration depicting Selesia casting fire magic, but this proves to have no effect on the real Selesia. Meanwhile, Mamika overhears the Military Uniform Princess talking about Sōta and someone named Setsuna.
4	"That Time I Said Hello to Him If so, I want to protect what he loved." Transliteration: "Sono Toki wa Kare ni Yoroshiku" (Japanese: そのときは彼によろしく If so, I want to protect what he loved.)	April 29, 2017
Meteora visits the company who developed Avalken of Reminisce, only to learn her creator, Nobuyuki Sakamoto, died in an accident a year ago. After playing her game overnight, Meteora, content that her creator put great care into crafting her world, shares her theories on the Military Uniform Princess' objective. Noticing that the supernatural abilities that come from their respective worlds conflict with the laws of physics in the real world, Meteora predicts that if more creations appear and cause disorder to the real world's common sense, the fabric of reality may be destroyed as a result. Elsewhere, Alicetaria questions the Military Uniform Princess after her own attempt to get her creator to change her world also ended in failure, while also making friends with Mamika. Later, Takashi receives a call from Masaaki Nakanogane, scenario writer of the Infinite Divine Machine Mono Magia mecha series, who informs him that both the main character, Rui Kanoya, and his giant mech Gigas Machina, have appeared at his house.
5	"This Water is Coldest at the Bottom So, why don't we have ourselves a guys' night out?" Transliteration: "Doko Yori Mo Tsumetai Kono Mizu no Soko" (Japanese: どこよりも冷たいこの水の底 So, why don't we have ourselves a guys' night out?)	May 6, 2017
As the others go to Masaaki's house to hear about his encounter with Rui, they are suddenly surrounded by soldiers from the Special Defense Force. Agreeing to come quietly, the group are brought to the recently created Special Situations Countermeasures Council, where General Coordination Officer Kikuchihara explains how they have been observing the situation regarding the creations that have appeared. As the two groups exchange information with each other, Meteora manages to gain the cooperation of the Countermeasures Council, agreeing to work together to keep the creations under control and prevent the destruction of their worlds. Upon returning home, Sōta recalls a girl named Setsuna Shimazaki, which leads him to recognize the Military Uniform Princess as Setsuna's original character, Altair.
6	"Young Girls, Life is Short so Fall in Love You are the one who knows where justice lies." Transliteration: "Inochi Mijikashi Koiseyo Otome" (Japanese: いのち短し恋せよ乙女 You are the one who knows where justice lies.)	May 13, 2017
When Selesia comes by to talk with Sōta, he reluctantly hides what he has discovered from her. Meanwhile, Magane Chikujōin, an antagonist from the light novel and anime series Record of the Night Window Demon, wanders around Tokyo and attracts the Situations Countermeasures Council's attention after she kills a bookstore owner. Magane is confronted by Mamika and Alicetaria who try to convince her to join their side. Alicetaria attempts to attack her after being provoked by her, but is stopped by the arrival of Selesia and Meteora. Meteora tries to tell Alicetaria that she is being deceived by Altair, but she refuses to listen and fights them. With Mamika too scared to fight, Blitz Talker, a character from the anime and manga series Code・Babylon, decides to aid Alicetaria and manages to defeat Meteora. Before he can finish her, however, she is saved by Mamika, who announces that she will not standby anymore.
7	"A Small Armageddon I don't want to make a mistake for the sake of the people who are in my story." Transliteration: "Sekai no Chīsana Shūmatsu" (Japanese: 世界の小さな終末 I don't want to make a mistake for the sake of the people who are in my story.)	May 20, 2017
Just as Mamika begins calming the situation down, Yūya arrives at the scene and begins fighting everyone. Rui then arrives with his Gigas Machina, forcing Alicetaria, Mamika, and Blitz to retreat. Afterwards, Yūya joins Sōta's group in hopes of finding powerful opponents to fight. Due to the danger posed by Magane, Kikuchihara tries to contact her creator, only to find that Magane had already killed him after using him to acquire intel. Sōta, Takashi, Marine, and Masaaki try to learn more about Altair, with Sōta withholding that he already discovered her true identity. The next day, Masaaki finds an illustration of Altair on a fan-fic site. Meanwhile, Sōta encounters Mamika who convinces him to tell her what he knows about Altair while Magane secretly eavesdrops on them.
8	"Everything I Can Do I CHOSE this way of life." Transliteration: "Watashi ni Dekiru Subete no Koto" (Japanese: わたしにできるすべてのこと I CHOSE this way of life.)	May 27, 2017
From the illustration found by Masaaki, the others learn about Altair and Setsuna. They also take custody of Shunma Suruga, the author of Code・Babylon, and Ryo Yatoji, the author of Exclusive Underground: Dark Night. Next day, Sōta meets with Meteora and tells her about a person who once hurt his friend's feelings out of jealousy. When he asks her what that person should have done, Meteora states that that person should have accepted his feelings and used them to become a better person. Afterwards, Sōta is confronted by Magane, who deduces that he was the person who hurt his friend's feelings, resulting in their death, and blackmails him into becoming her ally. Meanwhile, Mamika confronts Altair about her intentions and they talk about their opposing ideologies. However, when Mamika mentions Setsuna, Altair snaps and impales her with several swords, forcing Mamika to cast a huge explosion to escape.
9	"The Blooming Maiden Digs a Hole This world requires choice and resolution." Transliteration: "Hanasaku Otome yo Ana o Hore" (Japanese: 花咲く乙女よ穴を掘れ This world requires choice and resolution.)	June 3, 2017
Mamika, having sustained severe wounds from her confrontation with Altair, comes across Magane. In her final breaths, she tells Magane to pass along a message to Alicetaria before she succumbs to her injuries, disappearing from the world. However, Magane deliberately twists Mamika's final words in order to make Alicetaria believe Meteora was responsible for her death. Magane then calls Sōta, who inevitably realises from her lies that Mamika was killed by Altair as a result of what he had told her. Magane also swifts the blame onto Sōta, attempting to break his spirit, but she is interrupted by Yūya, who was eavesdropping. Sōta is then confronted by Meteora, causing him to breakdown and reveal that he knew Setsuna and he drove her to her death. Yūya fights Magane with Meteora joining in, when they are interrupted by the arrival of Alicetaria.
10	"Freeze, Die, Come to Life! We know exactly how you think and how you're fighting !"; Transliteration: "Ugoku na, Shine, Yomigaere!" (Japanese: 動くな、死ね、甦れ！ We know exactly how you think and how you're fighting !)	June 10, 2017
Alicetaria, still believing Meteora to be responsible for Mamika's death, fights against her while Magane holds off Yūya. During their battle, Magane manages to gain control of Yūya's Astral Double, Hangaku. Meanwhile, as Alicetaria overpowers Meteora, Sōta tries to stop her by telling her how much he loves her story, but this does not persuade her. Selesia then arrives with Takashi, Masaaki and the military and fights Alicetaria. However, Altair then appears with Blitz and uses her power to destroying Selesia's sword, causing her to be critically injured by Alicetaria's spear. Takashi, desperate to save Selesia, uploads the illustration of her using flame magic to his social media. The overwhelming response from the fans grants the real Selesia the ability to use flame magic, allowing her to fight back against Alicetaria. As Altair and the others are forced to retreat after she starts to fade away from overusing her powers, Selesia returns to her wounded state.
11	"The Monster Under the Eaves We cannot decide where we go but you can." Transliteration: "Nokishita no Monsutā" (Japanese: 軒下のモンスター We cannot decide where we go but you can.)	June 17, 2017
As Selesia and Meteora recover, Sōta still feels himself responsible for what happened, when Rui appears and takes him for a ride on Gigas Makina to cheer him up. After returning to the others, Sōta reveals that he knew Setsuna, whose real name was Yuna Shimazaki, and blames himself for her death. Sōta explains how he and Yuna met through an image board and became close friends since then. As time passed, however, Sōta began to grow jealous of Yuna as her work became more popular while his own drawings did not get much attention. When Yuna became falsely accused of plagiarism, Sōta refrained from helping her, not only out of fear that he could make things worse, but because somehow deep inside him, he felt himself satisfied with her predicament.
12	"Too Early to Roll the Ending Credits Be desperate and draw something fascinating." Transliteration: "Endorōru ni wa Hayasugiru" (Japanese: エンドロールには早すぎる Be desperate and draw something fascinating.)	June 24, 2017
After Sōta refrained himself from giving her any real support in her time of need, Yuna sent him one final message containing the Altair: World Étude video that Altair first appears in. Later learning that Yuna had committed suicide shortly afterwards, Sōta deleted all messages and media relating to her to try and forget about her. Given encouragement by Meteora, Sōta assumes responsibility for his actions and resolves to stop Altair. Meanwhile, Alicetaria, remembering what Sōta said about her story, decides to release her imprisoned creator, Gai Takarada, after hearing his motivation for creating the story. Resuming their planning, Sōta and the others learn that Altair has the power to use almost unlimited abilities depicted in derivative fan works, but will be rejected by the world if she overuses them. Seeing that as their chance, Meteora proposes a plan in which the creators write side stories of their characters leading to the creation of a crossover world where they can trap Altair. Elsewhere, Altair and Blitz continue with their plan and are joined by Charon, the male lead of Elemental Symphony of Vogelchevalier.
13	"The Usual Way, the Way Back An unpredictable story that no one knows where it's leading to." Transliteration: "Itsumo no Yori Michi Modori Michi" (Japanese: いつものより道もどり道 An unpredictable story that no one knows where it's leading to.)	July 1, 2017
Meteora recaps the events of the story up until now, providing her own perspective and embellishments while also providing more backstory of each for the creations and their respective series.
14	"Why We Travel I feel painful and so useless that I want to cry but it's fun nevertheless." Transliteration: "Bokura ga Tabi ni Deru Riyū" (Japanese: ぼくらが旅に出る理由 I feel painful and so useless that I want to cry but it's fun nevertheless.)	July 8, 2017
Kikuchihara gathers together the staff behind each series at Nissan Stadium to inform them of the planned multimedia crossover project, Elimination Chamber Festival, which will culminate in an anime special titled Border World Colliseum that will lure out Altair. Since simply making Altair weaker in the story would not have any effect, Kikuchihara emphasises to the staff that they must try to make their respective characters stronger than Altair while still gaining acceptance from their audience. As the project is announced and production begins on the spin-off works, the creators struggle to work with each other due to their conflicting worldviews and opinions. Meanwhile, Marine explains to Sōta that even though she feels down when comparing herself to the other artists, recognising her faults and improving upon them is part of the fun. As tension between the creators calms down as they manage to work out compromises, Sōta, wanting to get involved as well, asks Matsubara to let him create his own original character for the story. Elsewhere, Selesia and Rui come across another Creation, Hikayu Hoshikawa from the dating sim The Milky Way of a Starry Sky.
15	"Waves Approach the End of Wandering This is perfect! She couldn't have been any more perfect!" Transliteration: "Samayoi no Hate Nami wa Yoseru" (Japanese: さまよいの果て波は寄せる This is perfect! She couldn't have been any more perfect!)	July 15, 2017
As Hikayu is brought under Kikuchihara's custody, Sho Hakada, the protagonist of Exclusive Underground: Dark Night, joins Altair's team in the hopes of getting revenge against Yūya, while Alicetaria approaches Magane with a certain request. The next day, Takarada, along with Milky Way's writer Nishio Ōnishi, join the other creators to discuss how to improve Alicetaria and Hikayu's abilities. Meanwhile, Altair speaks with Blitz about her awareness of the other team's plan, asking him not to participate in the final battle.
16	"Wonderful Days This is the actual beginning, isn't it?" Transliteration: "Subarashii Hibi" (Japanese: すばらしい日々 This is the actual beginning, isn't it?)	July 29, 2017
With preparations almost ready, the creators and creations go to a hot springs inn to rest up for the Elimination Chamber Festival. As thousands of fans are assembled at Nissan Stadium for the festival, Meteora activates a new spell that works similar to Altair's abilities to create a copy of Tokyo for the creations to fight in, along with thousands of cameras to record it and make it seem like a normal anime. She also brings Celesia's mech, Vogelchevalier, into the real world for her to use and enchants Yūya's bokken with an ice spell to increase its power. Meanwhile, Altair's group prepares to move out.
17	"The Rain's Rhythm Shoots Down on the World's Roof I mean, I'm the CREATOR."; Transliteration: "Sekai no Yane o Utsu Ame no Rizumu" (Japanese: 世界の屋根を撃つ雨のリズム I mean, I'm the CREATOR.)	August 12, 2017
Border World Colliseum begins and thousands of fans begin watching it. Altair's group confronts Sōta's and fighting ensues; Selesia fights Altair while Alicetaria holds off Rui and Shō confronts Yūya. Meanwhile, Sōta is confronted by Magane while watching the fight from Nissan Stadium. Altair easily blocks all of Selesia's attacks before revealing that she is fully aware of their plan and can escape at any time, but chooses to play along to entertain the audience. Back at Nissan Stadium, Blitz confronts his creator, Shunma, about why she killed his daughter, Erina, in his story. The two talks about their ideologies, but they are unable to see eye-to-eye and Blitz prepares to kill her. Before he can do so, however, the military intervenes. It is then revealed that Shunma resurrected Erina and is using her as a hostage to force Blitz to betray Altair.
18	"All of Us Are Incomplete As long as we're alive, we have to enjoy our lives to the fullest." Transliteration: "Subete Fukanzen na Bokutachi wa" (Japanese: すべて不完全な僕たちは As long as we're alive, we have to enjoy our lives to the fullest.)	August 19, 2017
Shunma gives Blitz the option to return to his world with Erina if he betrays Altair. Back with Sōta, Magane reveals that she knows that he attempts to make his own creation to help stop Altair. She then claims that the readers of his story will accept it and provokes him into rejecting that claim, allowing her to use her powers the make people accept it. She also returns "Hangaku" to Yūya. When asked by Sōta why she is helping him, she tells him that it's just to entertain herself. With "Hangaku" returned to him and receiving aid from Hikayu, who has become a martial artist due to Nishio's alterations, and Blitz, who switched sides, Yūya defeats Shō. Despite this, however, Shō continues swearing vengeance against Yūya for killing his sister and friend. This prompts Yūya to spoil their story's ending by revealing he did not kill anyone and was set up by the true culprit, who is revealed to be the same person who gave Shō his powers. Selesia casts a spell that temporary cuts Altair off from her powers. Rui and Alicetaria, who realized that Altair killed Mamika, then charge at her, but are intercepted by Charon piloting a darker version of Vogelchevalier.
19	"Wrapped in Kindness The story continues, as long as there is someone out there, who believes in my existence." Transliteration: "Yasashisa ni Tsutsumareta Nara" (Japanese: やさしさに包まれたなら The story continues, as long as there is someone out there, who believes in my existence.)	August 26, 2017
Selesia cannot bring herself to fight Charon, who is tired of fighting and thus intends to use the power of the creators to save their world. Meanwhile, Alicetaria fights Altair, who reveals to her that she was indeed the one who killed Mamika. Provoked by Altair, Alicetaria charges at her and successfully impales her with lance. However, Altair then uses an ability that changes the principle of cause and effect, causing Alicetaria to be the one injured by her attack and resulting in her dying and disappearing. Meanwhile, Rui holds off Charon while Selesia still cannot bring herself to fight him. Yūya, Hikayu, Blitz and Shō, who was convinced by Yūya to join them, try to aid Rui, but are intercepted by Altair. Selesia finally makes by her mind after both Hikayu and Rui scold both her and Charon respectively for not fulfilling their duties as the leads of their story. She then uses a spell that immobilizes both hers and Charon's Vogelchevaliers and convinces Rui to fire at them with his "Gigas Machina", killing them both.
20	"Before the Reverberation Disappears Somebody receives the power of creation, and the spirit is redeveloped from their passion." Transliteration: "Zankyō ga Kieru Sono Zen ni" (Japanese: 残響が消えるその前に Somebody receives the power of creation, and the spirit is redeveloped from their passion.)	September 2, 2017
Following Selesia's death, Rui's "Gigas Machina" runs out of power while Altair simply laughs. Enraged by this, Hikayu charges at her, only for Altair to take away her abilities. This causes Meteora to realize that Altair has gained the audience's acceptance, removing the limitations on her abilities. In response to this, the creators use their secret weapon, Sirius; a creation with the same powers as Altair, based on the final design made by Setsuna. Knowing they cannot defeat her, the creators have Sirius use her abilities to absorb Altair into herself. With Altair seemingly defeated everyone breaths of sigh of relief, until Sirius empales Yūya with several swords. It is then revealed that, because Sirius did not have a personality, Altair was able to take control of her body. She then proceeds to easily defeat Shō, leaving only Blitz to fight her as the real world begins to collapse. In response, Sōta proposes to the Creators that they use the Creation he made. Meteora tries to bring Sōta's creation of the real world and, because Magane used her ability to make the audience accept it, it works. The creations are then transported to a train station where they are confronted by Setsuna, much to Altair's shock.
21	"The World is for Us Two I love you too." Transliteration: "Sekai wa Futari no Tame ni" (Japanese: 世界は二人のために I love you too.)	September 9, 2017
Altair realizes that the Setsuna in front of her is a creation based on her, yet possessing all her memories and feelings. Setsuna apologizes to Altair, believing herself to be responsible for everything since she created her as an outlet for her pain. However, Altair tells her that her desiring to destroy the real world is something she decided for herself. Setsuna then convinces Altair to stop and the two reconcile. However, Setsuna concludes that, since the real her is already dead, she should not exist in the real world anymore and attempts to replicate her real self's suicide by throwing herself in front of a train. Altair tries to save her and, because the audience wants her to, she succeeds. She then proceeds to create an entire world where she and Setsuna could be together for the rest of eternity. Realizing that Sōta is her creator, Setsuna tells Altair that she originally created her to show her to him. Overhearing this brings Sōta to tears, finally being a creator like she was. Border World Coliseum then ends with the screen simply displaying the words: "Mundum divit factum, atque pulchre. (THE WORLD IS FULL OF ABUNDANCE AND BEAUTY)".
22	"Re:CREATORS"; Transliteration: "Rekurieitāzu" (Japanese: レクリエイターズ)	September 16, 2017
Following the end of Border World Coliseum, the creators praise Sōta for his creation. Takashi mourns over Selesia's death, but Meteora ensures him that she'll continue to exist as long as he continues to write her story. Several weeks later, Meteora tells the surviving creations that her magic is fading due to it going in against the laws of the real world. She therefore gives the others several days to do as they like before sending them back to their own worlds; Yūya and Shō renew their friendship, Rui and Hikayu enjoy a normal day and Sōta visits Setsuna's grave with Meteora. On the last possible day, Meteora opens a portal and the other creations return to their worlds. However, because she created the portal, Meteora herself cannot use it. Her magic then fades away, causing her to become a normal person. Meteora decides to become a creator while the other creators move on with their lives. Some time later, Sōta receives a text message from Meteora that she has almost finished with the novel she is writing, but cannot decide on a title. Sōta texts Meteora back and the words of encouragement he gives her prompts her to call her story "Re:CREATORS".

Specials:

1. "Enter the World of Re:Creators" (April 1, 2017)
2. "Re:Creators Summer Special: Spending Time with the Girl Creations!" (July 22, 2017)
3. "Re:Creators Summer Special Continued: It's Summer! It's Yukata! It's a Girls Party!" (August 5, 2017)

=== Soundtrack ===
Re:CREATORS Original Soundtrack

Soundtrack album by Hiroyuki Sawano
- Released: June 14, 2017
- Genre: Soundtrack
- Length: 2:14:55
- Label: Aniplex
- Producers: Hiroyuki Sawano, Yasushi Horiguchi (co-producer)

The series' soundtrack was composed by Hiroyuki Sawano. The soundtrack album was released by Aniplex on June 14, 2017, with a total of 34 tracks split across two discs.

All music is composed by Hiroyuki Sawano.

Re:CREATORS Original Soundtrack – CD1
No.	Title	Lyrics	Vocals	Length
1.	"God of ink"	Benjamin; mpi	mpi	4:11
2.	"rE:CRe@T0RS"			5:37
3.	"Re:3$penS"			4:29
4.	"4GL4yu8RE:E"			4:15
5.	"Hey39-udn"			3:59
6.	"RE:3343"			2:38
7.	"HERE I AM"	cAnON.	Gemie	3:58
8.	"2109-a8Ru件"			3:39
9.	"AL:Lu"	Tielle	Eliana	4:12
10.	"高度8b6n"			4:35
11.	"8sawOGRE6"			4:26
12.	"Layers"	Benjamin; mpi	Aimee Blackschleger	3:46
13.	"re:pianohi1tars"			3:27
14.	"∞GodMachine"			4:18
15.	"ABYSSwaltz"	Rie	Gemie	4:14
16.	"Pf:Creators"			2:24
17.	"音:9RE:eita-zu"			6:35
18.	"BRAVE THE OCEAN"	Benjamin; mpi	Eliana	4:26
Total length:				1:15:09

Re:CREATORS Original Soundtrack – CD2
No.	Title	Length
1.	"E:verydaytor1"	5:50
2.	"Pf:CreatorsII"	2:23
3.	"E:verydaytor2"	3:56
4.	"Pf:CreatorsIII"	1:58
5.	"SawElephant4ゅ"	4:03
6.	"Pf:CreatorsIV"	2:58
7.	"E:verydaytor3"	5:54
8.	"Pf:CreatorsV"	2:11
9.	"God々-ground2SAY310"	4:33
10.	"Pf:CreatorsVI"	2:31
11.	"E:verydaytor4"	5:38
12.	"○DA-world2HEN火90"	1:36
13.	"God of ink <RE:Instrumental>"	4:11
14.	"HERE I AM <RE:Instrumental>"	3:56
15.	"Layers <RE:Instrumental>"	3:44
16.	"BRAVE THE OCEAN <RE:Instrumental>"	4:24
Total length:		0:59:46

=== Manga ===
A manga adaptation by Daiki Kase was serialized in Shogakukan's seinen manga magazine Monthly Sunday Gene-X from April 19, 2017, to November 19, 2019. Shogakukan collected its chapters in six tankōbon volumes, released from August 7, 2017, to December 19, 2019.

Another manga adaptation by Yūki Kumagai, that served as a spin-off to the main anime series that focused on a different set of characters, titled Re:Creators One More! (Re:CREATORS わんもあ！), was serialized in Shogakukan's Monthly Shōnen Sunday from June 12 to November 10, 2017. Shogakukan released a compiled tankōbon volume on December 19, 2017.

A spin-off manga by Tatsuhiko Ida, titled Chikujōin-san Hashagisugi (築城院さんハシャギ過ぎ; Chikujōin-san is Having Way Too Much Fun), was serialized on Shogakukan's Sunday Webry website from August 6 to November 5, 2017. A collected tankōbon volume was released on December 19, 2017.

==== Volumes ====
No.	Release date	ISBN
1	August 7, 2017	978-4-09-157496-1
2	December 19, 2017	978-4-09-157507-4
3	July 27, 2018	978-4-09-157536-4
4	November 19, 2018	978-4-09-157548-7
5	July 19, 2019	978-4-09-157569-2
6	December 19, 2019	978-4-09-157582-1

== See also ==
- Akashic Re:cords, a Japanese role-playing video game with a similar theme
- Reverse Isekai
