= Revy (Black Lagoon) =

Fictional character from Black Lagoon

- Black Lagoon character
- Revy as illustrated by Rei Hiroe
- First appearance: Black Lagoon chapter 0: "Black Lagoon" (April 19, 2002)
- Created by: Rei Hiroe
- Voiced by: Megumi Toyoguchi (Japanese); Maryke Hendrikse (English)

Revy (Japanese: レヴィ, Hepburn: Revi), also known by her real name Rebecca Lee, is a character from Rei Hiroe's manga Black Lagoon. She serves as the primary combatant for the Lagoon Company. Born in Chinatown, Manhattan, near Mott Street, she is a Chinese American with a criminal past. Flashbacks suggest she developed her firearms proficiency through informal practice, including shooting at cans, and may have killed her abusive father as a teenager. The CIA notes she remains infamous with the NYPD, particularly the fictional 27th Precinct.

== Appearances ==
The Lagoon Company consists of four members: Dutch, the leader; Revy, the main gunfighter; Benny, the mechanic, computer specialist, and researcher; and Rock, an ex-salaryman hijacked by the team and abandoned by his department chief, eventually becoming their negotiator and "professional" face of the group, retaining his old job skills. Their base of operations is located in the fictional harbor city of Roanapur in east Thailand near the border of Cambodia (somewhere in the Mueang Trat district, likely on the mainland north/northeast of the Ko Chang island or on the island itself). The city is home to the Chinese triad, the Russian Bratva, the Colombian cartel, the Italian mafia, a wide assortment of pickpockets, thugs, mercenaries, thieves, prostitutes, assassins, and gunmen. The city also has a large Vietnamese refugee population following the Vietnamese refugees exodus after the communist takeover of Vietnam in 1975.

Revy is aggressive, foul-mouthed, and emotionally volatile, favoring violence over diplomacy. Despite her hardened demeanor, she is highly ticklish and indulges heavily in smoking and drinking. Her relationship with Rock begins with hostility—she once nearly kills him during an argument—but she later becomes fiercely protective of him, saving his life multiple times. Eda's teasing implies romantic tension, particularly when Revy deflects questions about her feelings rather than outright denying them. A supremely skilled fighter, Revy's marksmanship and reflexes border on superhuman, with few rivals such as Roberta and Ginji. She acknowledges Mr. Chang's superior skill but aspires to match it. Her preferred weapons are a pair of modified Beretta 92FS pistols, featuring extended barrels, suppressor compatibility, and engravings including a Jolly Roger and Thai inscriptions. Ambidextrous, she earns the nickname "Two Hands" in Roanapur, a reference to Douglas E. Winter's novel Run. She also demonstrates proficiency with rifles and grenade launchers. Shaped by a traumatic past, Revy adopts a nihilistic worldview, relying solely on her own strength and resources.

An illustration book, titled Onslaught: Black Lagoon Illustrations, was released by Shogakukan on August 19, 2021. The limited edition included a water gun replica of Revy's modified Beretta 92 FS "Sword Cutlass Special", five autographed illustrations and six bookmarks.

== Creation ==
Regarding Revi's creation, manga author Rei Hiroe said that he had no particular model in mind, but commented that after watching Robert Rodriguez's film From Dusk till Dawn, he noticed the "imposing tattoo" on the shoulder of George Clooney's character and thought that it "would be nice" to do such a tattoo on a female body. For her personality, Hiroe first wanted that her dominant character trait was impulsiveness. To accentuate it, he decided to make her grow up in a criminal environment, so that her values were totally different from "ordinary mortals." Hiroe commented that she is a strong woman, good at shooting guns and fighting, but that she is not motivated by justice and that she is just an "ordinary criminal", adding that he placed her in the story because "it is rare to see such a female" and her presence would make it more interesting.

Hiroe commented that the reason behind her Chinese-American heritage was because he wanted to make her a minority, adding that she does not look Caucasoid but rather Mongoloid, and that it would make it easier for Japanese readers to identify with her; "easier than if it was a white woman going ballistic." He added that it is interesting when there is a gap between the way she looks and her way of thinking, commenting that people like that "aren't really tied down to a region, like they're rootless wanderers", and that "obviously, she probably faces discrimination in her life", adding that taking all that into account, he thought the character would "stand out more." Hiroe said that Revy is the character that requires most work from a graphic point of view, expressing that he had drawn her countless of times in very different situations and emotions, and that he must be careful to not go in another direction over time, so as to not distort the initial character.

== Reception ==
Critical response to Revy has generally been positive due to her characterization and relationships. Mark Thomas of Mania.com praised its unexpected moral depth and the central relationship between Rock and Revy. Noting how she had no notable major dilemmas with the villains, Tasha Robinson of Sci Fi Weekly compared Revy's chaotic style to Kill Bill without a clear protagonist comparing Eda and her relationship to South Park-esque argument as a result of their misrealtionship. Christopher Homer (Mania.com) praised the disturbing yet compelling twins' arc and Revy/Rock's evolving dynamic. Greg McElhatton of Read About Comics commended highlighted Revy's philosophical debates with Rock as a strong point without disrupting the narrative, calling it "an action comic for people who appreciate a smart script." Bradley Meek of THEM Anime Reviews said that despite Revy coming across as a "cool" character, she is overshadowed by Rock for how he integrates into the narrative. Joseph Luster of Otaku USA agreed despite finding appreciating how the series continuously uses Revy's fighting skills; "Revy is mostly relegated to the hot-headed gun of the group and left at that.". He claims she works as Rocks' antithesis due to their major differences and believes the anime could have further developed her.

In a comparison with film director Quentin Tarantino's notable violent works, Collider wrote that "Revy is the engine that powers the show", fitting for what would be a female protagonist written by Tarantino. However, rather than seeing a trauma notable in violent works of fiction, Revy comes across as a notorious rude character. Screen Rant regarded Revy as one of the most violent characters in anime due to her abuse of firepower which related to the violent setting the narrative employs. The writer said Revy further stands out in the series for enjoying the violence which she is involved in, making her one of the most brutal antiheroes in anime history. John Rose from Mania regarded Revy as one of the most appealing gunslingers in anime as backed by her handling of Beretta 92FS.

In "Focus and Framing in Black Lagoon vs. Gurren Lagann" Peter Fobian from Anime Feminist compared the sexualization of female characters from both Black Lagoon and Gurren Lagann as both of their respective heroines Revy and Yoko are often seen as sexualized. This is notable through the concept of the male gaze which places emphasis of the designs of both heroines who both stand out in their respective organizations for sharing a similar look appealing to men. The sexualized angles are used in both characters for both comical and serious situations where the two characters are often active despite the animators using the bodies for sex appeal. Besides scenes involving interactions, the two characters are also part of fight scenes where their bodies are exposed in the process, wielding similar type of guns. The two also have conflicting scenes with different male characters, Rock and Kamina. In comparing the characters, the writer believes that while Revy is still taken seriously in her own series, Yoko is undermined by her sexualization and thus barely feels like a character.

In "The Moral Relativism of Black Lagoon", Matthew Roe from Anime News Network said that Rock's antic are dictated by Revy who gradually supports him in his character's arc involving how he adapts to dark moral though the relationship often struggles as a result of Revy not liking his views. Revy's opportunism is said to be the result of the traumatic events caused in New York which gave her the ideals of wanting to survive no matter what. As Rock questions Revy, the two begin to understand each other, changing Revy into a tsundere archetype of character as she remains violent despite supporting Rock in the narrative.
