= Megumi Toyoguchi =

Japanese voice actress (born 1978)

- 豊口 めぐみ
- Born: January 2, 1978 (age 48); Machida, Tokyo, Japan
- Occupation: Voice actress
- Years active: 1997–present
- Agent: 81 Produce
- Notable work: Pokémon Diamond & Pearl as Dawn / Hikari; Persona 3 as Yukari Takeba; Danganronpa as Junko Enoshima; Bleach as Riruka Dokugamine; Suite Precure as Seiren/Ellen Kurokawa/Cure Beat; Kingdom Hearts as Aqua; Fullmetal Alchemist as Winry Rockbell; Black Lagoon as Revy; Rilu Rilu Fairilu as Dante
- Children: 1

Megumi Toyoguchi (豊口 めぐみ, Toyoguchi Megumi; born January 2, 1978) is a Japanese voice actress. Some of her starring roles are Yao Sakurakouji in Miami Guns, Ran Kotobuki in Super Gals!, Winry Rockbell in Fullmetal Alchemist (first anime), Sei Sato in Maria-sama ga Miteru, Hikari (Dawn) in Pokémon, Riruka Dokugamine in Bleach, Revy in Black Lagoon, Seiren/Ellen Kurokawa/Cure Beat in Suite Precure and Miriallia Haw in Mobile Suit Gundam SEED & Mobile Suit Gundam SEED Destiny. In video games, she voiced Paine in Final Fantasy X-2, Junko Enoshima in Danganronpa, Rosie in Valkyria Chronicles, Yukari Takeba in Persona 3 (which was adapted into a film series) , Great sage in Tensura and Aqua in Kingdom Hearts.

== Biography ==
When she was in the upper grades of elementary school, she became addicted to anime when she watched Dragon Ball and became a fan of Tōru Furuya who played the role of Yamcha in the anime series. While she was in her second year of high school, she watched Furuya's role in Dragon Quest, and while imitating the characters, she became interested in working as a voice actress.

After graduating from high school, her parents requested a vocational school of voice actors, but were told to go to high school. After graduating from high school, she had the goal of becoming a voice actor in Nihon Kogakuin, but opposed her family. She wanted to get a job related to voice actors and switch to the Department of Acoustics and Arts to become a radio personality. In radio program production training, she mainly practiced personality by taking charge of personality, and was used in subsequent radio conversations.

Though she was a student at the same school, she requested the Mars Girl Audition for the radio program Hiroi Oji no Multi Heaven. From high school until now, she had failed several auditions, so finished the test. However, she won the Grand Prix and made a regular appearance on the radio. Later, Shigeru Chiba, who co-starred on the radio, became a member of 81 Produce, in that same period as Chie Chiba and Ryoka Kashiwagi.

In 2007, she expanded the scope of her work, including the dubbing roles of the main character Kanna in Kanna-san Daiseikō Desu!. The following year, she made her first appearance as a voice actress in Drama Battle Royale Gun Mage and The First Stage.

== Personal life ==
She reported in the end of 2016 that she was married and pregnant. In 2017, she gave birth to a baby boy. She is very interested in theater.

== Filmography ==
=== Anime ===
List of voice performances in anime
Year	Title	Role	Notes	Source
1998	Alice SOS	Alice		
1998	One Piece: Defeat Him! The Pirate Ganzack	Nami	OVA	
1998	Shadow Skill	Women Var 女性ヴァール		
1999	Dual! Parallel Trouble Adventure	Mitsuki Rara/ Miss Rah		
1999	Kaikan Phrase	Mikako ミカコ		
1999	Infinite Ryvius	Ran Luckmolde, Reiko Ichikawa, Charlotte Rakunes, Sandy Allen, Anna de Pompadour		
2000	Miami Guns	Yao Sakurakouji		
2000–04	Hamtaro	Maria		
2000–01	Vandread series	Parfet Balblair		
2001–02	Super Gals! Kotobuki Ran	Ran Kotobuki		
2001	Mahou Senshi Louie	Merrill		
2001	Shaman King	Reimei		
2001	Captain Kuppa	Minesu ミネス		
2002	Chobits	Yumi Omura		
2002	.hack//SIGN	Mimiru		
2002	The Twelve Kingdoms	Teiei		
2002	Petite Princess Yucie	Girl		
2002	Monkey Typhoon	Myūru		
2002	Mobile Suit Gundam SEED	Miriallia Haw		
2003	Stellvia	Ayaka Machida		
2003	Stratos 4	Annette Kerry		
2003	L/R: Licensed by Royalty	Claire Pennylane		
2003–04	Kaleido Star	Manami Yura		
2003	Astro Boy	Cala		
2003	Zatch Bell!	Princess Mariru		
2003	Scrapped Princess	Elfetine		
2003	Avenger	Layla Ashley		
2003	Fullmetal Alchemist	Winry Rockbell		
2004	Burst Angel	Meg	Also Infinity in 2007	
2004–09	Maria-sama ga Miteru	Sei Sato		
2004	Burn-Up Scramble	Rio Kinezono		
2004	Sgt. Frog	Melody Honey		
2004	The Marshmallow Times	Chamomile		
2004	Monster	Librarian	Ep. 34	
2004	Initial D	Kyoko Iwase		
2004	Samurai Champloo	Lily		
2004	Le Portrait de Petit Cossette	Shōko Mataki	OVA	
2004	DearS	Rubi		
2004	Fafner of the Azure	Mjölnir, Yosho no Kazuki		
2004	Haruka: Beyond the Stream of Time: A Tale of the Eight Guardians	Akane-hime		
2004	Mobile Suit Gundam SEED Destiny	Miriallia Haw		
2004	Gakuen Alice	Yuri Miyazono		
2005	Majime ni Fumajime Kaiketsu Zorori	Ranra, Momo		
2005	MAR	Gido		
2005	Strawberry 100%	Tsukasa Nishino	Also OVAs	
2005	Glass Mask	Taiko Kasuga		
2005–06	Tsubasa Reservoir Chronicle	Charme		
2005	Kirameki Project	Nene	OVA	
2005	Onegai My Melody	Mana Fujisaki		
2005	Moeyo Ken	Koyuki		
2005	Gun × Sword	Bunny Montana (Honey Cherry)		
2005	Last Order: Final Fantasy VII	Turk (gun)	OVA	
2005	Canvas 2 ~Niji Iro no Sketch~	Mami Takeuchi		
2005	Gunparade March	Sara Ishida		
2005	Hell Girl	Shiori Akasaka		
2005	Aria: The Animation	Amelie		
2005	Black Cat	Saya Minatsuki		
2005	Blood+	Irène		
2005	Paradise Kiss	Tanabe 田辺		
2006	Rec	Yoshioka		
2006	Simoun	Alty		
2006	.hack//Roots	Tabby		
2006	Spider Riders	Lemin		
2006	Onegai My Melody: KuruKuru Shuffle!	Mana Fujisaki		
2006	Nana	Mali		
2006	Black Lagoon	Revy		
2006	The Third: The Girl with the Blue Eye	Honoka		
2006	Innocent Venus	Renee Vikro		
2006–2010	Pocket Monsters: Diamond & Pearl series	Hikari (Dawn)		
2006	Tokimeki Memorial Only Love	Hiromi Ohtama		
2006	D.Gray-man	Miranda Lotto		
2006	Sumomomo Momomo	Kinu Ayatsuji		
2006	Shooting Star Rockman	Otorihime incense 鳳姫香		
2006	Tokyo Tribe 2	Glue のり		
2007	Fushigiboshi no Futago Hime Gyu!	Queen Edward		
2007	Naruto Shippuden	Hotaru		
2007	Hayate the Combat Butler	Kirika Kuzuha		
2007	El Cazador de la Bruja	Melissa		
2007	Onegai My Melody: Sukkiri	Mana Fujisaki		
2007	Claymore	Sophia		
2007	Darker than Black	Chiaki Shinoda		
2007	The Story of Saiunkoku	Ran Jyūsan-hime		
2007	Buzzer Beater	Rachel	Phase 2	
2007	CODE-E	Mils Brinberg		
2007	Bamboo Blade	Kirino Chiba		
2007	Myself ; Yourself	Yuzuki Fujimura		
2007	Neuro: Supernatural Detective	Picture Ishiya Yuka 絵石屋由香		
2008	Macross Frontier	Klan Klang		
2008	Allison and Lilia	Graz - Akusentinu (Axe) グラツ・アクセンティーヌ（アックス）		
2008	To Love-Ru	Daughter		
2008	Blue Dragon: Trials of the Seven Shadows	Lotta race ロッタレース		
2008	Kamen no Maid Guy	Fubuki		
2008	Golgo 13	Cindy		
2008	Mission-E	Mils Brinberg		
2008	Sands of Destruction	Aya		
2008	Blade of the Immortal	Hyaku琳 百琳		
2008	Stitch!	Dolores		
2009	Akikan!	Kizaki Airin		
2009	Maria Holic	Fumi Kumagai	Also Alive in 2011	
2009	Viper's Creed	Sakurako		
2009	Rideback	Shōko Uemura		
2009	Phantom: Requiem for the Phantom	Hirono Inada		
2009	Pandora Hearts	Lottie		
2009	Cross Game	Tsukishima Ichiyou		
2009	Needless	Riru Roukakuji		
2009	Princess Lover!	Sylvia van Hossen		
2009	The Sacred Blacksmith	Aria		
2010	Mobile Suit Gundam Unicorn	Mihiro Oiwakken	OVA	
2010	Ikki Tousen: Xtreme Xecutor	Mouyuu		
2010	Major	Emily	6th TV series	
2010	Lilpri	Minami Okada		
2010	Rainbow: Nisha Rokubō no Shichinin	Meg Yokosuka		
2010	Psychic Detective Yakumo	Makoto Hijikata		
2011–13	Infinite Stratos	Chifuyu Orimura		
2011	Gosick	Kuiaran the second		
2011	Suite PreCure	Seiren / Ellen Kurokawa / Cure Beat		
2011	Sengoku Otome: Momoiro Paradox	Oda Nobunaga		
2011	Sket Dance	Moe Yabasawa		
2011	Hyouge Mono	Osen		
2011	Nurarihyon no Mago: Sennen Makyou	Reira		
2011–12	Fate/Zero	Sola-Ui Nuada-Re Sophia-Ri		
2011	Bleach	Riruka Dokugamine		
2012	Saki series	Takami Shibuya	Starting with Achiga-hen episode of Side-A	
2012	Jormungand	Dr. Miami (Minami Amada)		
2012	Horizon on the Middle of Nowhere	Grace Omari / Mishina-Large グレイス・オマリ / 三科・大	Season 2	
2012	Sword Art Online	Rosalia		
2012–15	Tamagotchi!	Kiraritchi	Starting with Yume Kira Dream	
2012	The Pet Girl of Sakurasou	Chihiro Sengoku		
2012–13	The World God Only Knows	Nora	OVA	
2013–15	Senran Kagura	Haruka		
2013	Danganronpa: The Animation	Junko Enoshima, Mukuro Ikusaba		
2013	Magi: The Kingdom of Magic	Irene Smirnoff		
2014	Super Sonico: The Animation	Kinohon Sayaka 紀本さやか		
2014	D-Frag!	Tsutsumi Inada		
2014	The Irregular at Magic High School	Sayuri Shiba		
2014	Bakumatsu Rock	Your dragon お龍		
2014	Hanayamata	Sari Tokiwa		
2014	Re: ␣ hamatora	Beckoner		
2014	Cross Ange	Maggie		
2014	Girl Friend Beta	Akiho Shigetō		
2015	Plastic Memories	Kazumi Kuwanomi		
2015	Nisekoi	Hana Kirisaki	season 2	
2015	Rampo Kitan: Game of Laplace	Tokiko Kagami		
2015	Young Black Jack	Aoyama		
2016	Rilu Rilu Fairilu ~Yousei no Door~	Dante, Akoya, Rafflé, Fairilu Marje		
2016	JoJo's Bizarre Adventure: Diamond Is Unbreakable	Tomoko Higashikata	replaced by Shizuka Itō after episode 15	
2016	Haven't You Heard? I'm Sakamoto	Yui		
2016	High School Fleet	Kaoru Furushou		
2016	Danganronpa 3: The End of Hope's Peak High School	Junko Enoshima, Mukuro Ikusaba		
2018–24	That Time I Got Reincarnated as a Slime	Voice of the World, Great Sage, Raphael		
2019	My Roommate Is a Cat	Tora-nee-san		
2020	Super HxEros	Gitaichuu		
2020	Wandering Witch: The Journey of Elaina	Rosemary		
2021	I-Chu: Halfway Through the Idol	Yuzuki Asahina		
2021	Mushoku Tensei	Ghislaine Dedoldia		
2021	Dragon Goes House-Hunting	Lamia		
2021	Pokémon Master Journeys: The Series	Hikari		
2022	RWBY: Ice Queendom	Pyrrha Nikos		
2023	The Legend of Heroes: Trails of Cold Steel – Northern War	Sara Valestein		
2024	Bleach: Thousand Year Blood War	Riruka Dokugamine		
2024	I Parry Everything	Mianne		
2025	Magic Maker: How to Make Magic in Another World	Ema		
2025	Yu-Gi-Oh! Go Rush!!	Ferko Oka Sur		
2026	Smoking Behind the Supermarket with You	Ōno		
2026	The Laid-Off Cheat-Granting Mage Enjoys a Second Lease on Life	Glenda		

=== Film ===
List of voice performances in film
Year	Title	Role	Notes	Source
2002	A Tree of Palme	Popo		
2005	Fullmetal Alchemist the Movie: Conqueror of Shamballa	Winry Rockbell		
2006	Keroro Gunsō the Super Movie	Melody Honey		
2007	Pokémon: The Rise of Darkrai	Hikari		
2008	Pokémon: Giratina and the Sky Warrior	Hikari		
2009	Pokémon: Arceus and the Jewel of Life	Hikari		
2009	Macross Frontier: Itsuwari no Utahime	Klan Klang		
2009	Professor Layton and the Eternal Diva	Amelia Ruth		
2010	Pokémon: Zoroark: Master of Illusions	Hikari		
2010	Fafner in the Azure: Heaven and Earth	Mjölnir		
2011	Macross Frontier: Sayonara no Tsubasa	Klan Klang		
2011	Suite Precure♪ The Movie: Take it back! The Miraculous Melody that Connects Hearts	Ellen Kurokawa (Cure Beat)		
2012	.hack//The Movie	Yushiro weather 有城日和		
2012	Pretty Cure All Stars New Stage: Friends of the Future	Ellen Kurokawa (Cure Beat)		
2012	Macross FB 7: Ore no Uta o Kike!	Klan Klan	cross-over film	
2013	Pretty Cure All Stars New Stage 2: Friends of the Heart	Ellen Kurokawa (Cure Beat)		
2013	Persona 3 The Movie: No. 1, Spring of Birth	Yukari Takeba		
2014	Persona 3 The Movie: No. 2, Midsummer Knight's Dream	Yukari Takeba		
2015	Pretty Cure All Stars: Spring Carnival♪	Ellen Kurokawa (Cure Beat)		
2015	Persona 3 The Movie: No. 3, Falling Down	Yukari Takeba		
2016	Persona 3 The Movie: No. 4, Winter of Rebirth	Yukari Takeba		
2018	Hugtto! PreCure Futari wa Pretty Cure: All Stars Memories	Ellen Kurokawa (Cure Beat)		
2020	Demon Slayer: Kimetsu no Yaiba – The Movie: Mugen Train	Ruka Rengoku		
2022	That Time I Got Reincarnated as a Slime the Movie: Scarlet Bond	Raphael		

=== Drama CD ===
List of voice performances in drama CD
Title	Role	Notes	Source
D.N. Angel	With		
Fullmetal Alchemist	Winry Rockbell		
Gunparade March	Sara Ishida		
Hayate x Blade	Jun Kuga		
Infinite Ryvius			
Infinite Stratos	Chifuyu Orimura		
Kamen no Maid Guy	Fubuki	web radio	
Macross Frontier	Klan Klang		
Persona 3			
Psychic Detective Yakumo	Makoto Hijikata		
Shining Force EXA			
True Love Story 3			
Remember11			

=== Video games ===
List of voice performances in video games
Year	Title	Role	Notes	Source
1999	Kita e series (Diamond Daydreams)	Kozue Satonaka		
1999	Growlanser	Tippi	PS1/PS2, Also 2009 version	
2000	Rival Schools	Chairperson	DC	
2001	True Love Story 3	Yokuko Kudō	PS1/PS2	
2003	Final Fantasy X-2	Paine	PS2	
2003	Chobits	Yumi Omura	PS1/PS2	
2003	Growlanser Wayfarer of Time	Messenger Demon (D-TP type)	PS1/PS2, Also Over Reloaded in 2011	
2004	Stellvia	Ayaka Machida	PS1/PS2	
2004	Remember11 -the age of infinity-	Lin Mayuzumi	PS1/PS2	
2004	DearS	Rubi	PS1/PS2	
2004–05	Fullmetal Alchemist games	Winry Rockbell	PS1/PS2	
2004	Magna Carta	Justina Bon	PS1/PS2, Also Portable in 2006	
2005	Ichigo 100%: Strawberry Diary	Tsukasa Nishino	PS1/PS2	
2005	Egg Monster Hero	Katori Ita	PS1/PS2	
2005	Kingdom Hearts II	Paine	PS1/PS2	
2006	Gunparade March series	Sara Ishida	PS1/PS2	
2006	Canvas 2: Niji Iro no Sketch	Mami Takeuchi	PS1/PS2; PS2 version adds heroine. Art Department	
2006	Black Cat	Saya Minatsuki	PS1/PS2	
2006–06	.hack//G.U. series	Sakubo	PS1/PS2	
2006–24	Persona 3	Yukari Takeba	PS2/PSP, also FES, Portable and Reload	
2006	Asobi ni Iku yo! Engagement Asama ~ of ~ Earth pinch	Manami Kinjou	PS1/PS2	
2006	Chaos Wars	Tippi	PS1/PS2	
2006	REC ☆ pounding voice actor Paradise ☆	Yoshioka	PS1/PS2	
2007	Shining Force EXA	Riemsianne La Vaes	PS1/PS2	
2007–08	D.Gray-man games	Miranda Lotto		
2007	Castle of Shikigami III	Reika Kirishima	Wii	
2007–09	Myself ; Yourself	Yuzuki Fujimura	PS1/PS2	
2007	Star Ocean: First Departure	Fear Mell	PSP	
2008	Valkyria Chronicles	Rosie	PS3	
2008	Boys Over Flowers - Koiseyo girls! -	Makino Tsukushi	DS	
2008	Phantasy Star Portable	Vivienne	PSP	
2008	Macross Ace Frontier	Klan Klang	PSP	
2009	Kamen no Maid Guy Boyoyon Battle Royale	Fubuki	PSP	
2009	Bamboo Blade	Kirino Chiba	PSP	
2009	Macross Ultimate Frontier	Klan Klang	PSP	
2009	Phantasy Star Portable 2	Vivienne	PSP	
2010	Kingdom Hearts Birth by Sleep	Aqua	PSP, also provided new dialogue for the Secret Episode in the Final Mix (2011) version.	
2010	Valkyria Chronicles 2	Rosie	PSP	
2010	Last Ranker	Igorida イゴリダ	PSP	
2010	Neo Geo Heroes: Ultimate Shooting	A mysterious girl driving SYDIII	PSP	
2010	Another Century's Episode: R	Klan Klang	PS3	
2010	Danganronpa: Trigger Happy Havoc	Junko Enoshima, Mukuro Ikusaba		
2011	Majin and the Forsaken Kingdom	Ratumikaiku ラトゥミカイク	PS3	
2011	Valkyria Chronicles 3	Rosie	PSP	
2011	The Last Story	Siren	Wii	
2011	Macross Triangle Frontier	Klan Klang	PSP	
2011–16	Senran Kagura games	Haruka		
2011	A Certain Scientific Railgun	Seedlings Yoshiko 実生好子	PSP	
2012	Kingdom Hearts 3D: Dream Drop Distance	Aqua	3DS	
2012–13	Root Double: Before Crime*After Days	Ena Tsubakiyama	Also Xtend	
2012	Danganronpa 2: Goodbye Despair	Junko Enoshima		
2012	Tekken Tag Tournament 2	Kunimitsu	Console-exclusive character (DLC)	
2012	Project X Zone	Riemsianne La Vaes	3DS, from Shining Force EXA	
2012	Girl Friend Beta	Akiho Shigetō		
2013	The Pet Girl of Sakurasou	Chihiro Sengoku		
2013	Horizon on the Middle of Nowhere Portable	Mishina, large / Grace Omari 三科・大 / グレイス・オマリ	PSP	
2013–15	Saki games	Takami Shibuya	PSP	
2013	The Legend of Heroes: Trails of Cold Steel	Sara Valestein		
2014	Persona Q: Shadow of the Labyrinth	Yukari Takeba	3DS	
2014	Oreshika: Tainted Bloodlines			
2014	Lost Dimension	Nagi Shishiouka		
2014	Persona 4 Arena Ultimax	Yukari Takeba	PS3	
2014	Danganronpa Another Episode: Ultra Despair Girls	Shirokuma, Kurokuma		
2014	Hanayamata Yosakoi LIVE!	Sally-sensei		
2014	Assassin's Creed Unity	Elisé de La Serre	Models, PlayStation 4	
2015	Cross Ange tr.	Maggie		
2016	Plastic Memories	Kazumi Kuwanomi		
2017	Danganronpa V3: Killing Harmony	Junko Enoshima, Mukuro Ikusaba		
2017	Kingdom Hearts HD 2.8 Final Chapter Prologue	Aqua	PS4	
2017	Dragon Quest XI: Echoes of an Elusive Age	Cetacea, Puff-Puff Girl		
2017	Infinite Stratos: Archetype Breaker	Chifuyu Orimura	Smartphone game	
2017	.hack//G.U.: Last Recode	Sakubo, Tabby		
2018	Dissidia Final Fantasy Opera Omnia	Paine	Android/iOS	
2018	Persona 3: Dancing in Moonlight	Yukari Takeba		
2018	Persona Q2: New Cinema Labyrinth	Yukari Takeba		
2019	Kingdom Hearts III	Aqua	PS4	
2019	Catherine: Full Body	DLC Catherine		
2019	Seven Deadly Sins: Grand Cross	Freyja	Android/iOS/PC	
2019	Oninaki	Izana		
2020	World's End Club	Jennu	iOS, Switch	
2020	Granblue Fantasy	Shura	Android/iOS	
2020	Brigandine: The Legend of Runersia	Kate		
2020	Hatsune Miku: Colorful Stage!	Mafuyu's Mother	Android/iOS	
2020	Kingdom Hearts: Melody of Memory	Aqua		
2021	Another Eden	Kid	Android/iOS, from Chrono Cross	
2022	Arknights	Horn	Android/iOS	
2022	Eve: Ghost Enemies	Sherry Mea	PS4, Switch	
2022	Counter:Side	Kanami Kizuna (Lee Soo-Yeon)	PC, Android/iOS	
2023	Octopath Traveler II	Malaya	PS4/PS5, PC, Switch	
2024	Final Fantasy VII Rebirth	Elena		
2024	Reynatis	Alice Sudo	PS4, PS5, Switch, PC	
2025	Genshin Impact	Nicole Reeyn	PC, iOS, Android, PS5, Xbox Series X/S	
2026	Kyoto Xanadu	Toushu		

== Dubbing ==
List of voice performances in overseas and other dubbing
Title	Role	Voice dub for, notes	Source
12 Rounds 2: Reloaded	Sarah Malloy	Cindy Busby	
It's a Very Merry Muppet Christmas Movie	Elliot Reid	Sarah Chalke	
The Adventures of Sinbad	Maeve	Jacqueline Collen	
Big Mommas: Like Father, Like Son	Jasmine Lee	Portia Doubleday	
The Carrie Diaries	Maggie Landers	Katie Findlay	
Episodes	Morning Randolph	Mircea Monroe	
Flower Boys Next Door	Cha Do-hwi		
The Hole in the Ground	Sarah O'Neill	Seána Kerslake	
Kanna's Big Success	Kanna		
Legally Blondes	Annabelle "Annie" Woods	Camilla Rosso	
Nikita	Alex Udinov	Season 1	
How to Get Away with Murder	Rebecca Sutter	Katie Findlay	
When in Rome	Beth	Kristen Bell	
Animation
The Boondocks	Crystal		
Transformers Animated	Professor Princess		
Steven Universe	Sardonyx		
Ice Age: Dawn of the Dinosaurs	Ellie		
Ice Age: A Mammoth Christmas	Ellie		
Ice Age: Continental Drift	Ellie		
Ice Age: Collision Course	Ellie		
RWBY	Pyrrha Nikos	Volumes 1,2 and 4 only	
Tinker Bell	Rosetta		
Tinker Bell and the Lost Treasure	Rosetta		
Tinker Bell and the Great Fairy Rescue	Rosetta		
Tinker Bell and the Pixie Hollow Games	Rosetta		
Tinker Bell and the Secret of the Wings	Rosetta		
Tinker Bell and the Pirate Fairy	Rosetta		
Tinker Bell and the Legend of the NeverBeast	Rosetta		
Star Wars Rebels	Numa		
The Adventures of Happy Planet (Japanese)	Maya	From 2003 to 2005, in Japan	
Winx Club (animated TV series) (Japanese)	Stella	Since starts 2014, in Japan	

== Discography ==
=== Other songs ===
- "Hai Tatchi!" (Opening for Pokémon: Diamond and Pearl, sung with Rika Matsumoto)
- "Hai Tatchi! 2009" (Opening song of Gekijoban Pocket Monsters Diamond and Pearl: Arceus Chōkoku no Jikū e, and Opening for Pokémon: Diamond and Pearl, sung with Rika Matsumoto)
