= Black Lagoon =

Japanese manga series

- First tankōbon volume cover, featuring Revy
- Genre: Crime; Girls with guns; Thriller
- Manga
- Written by: Rei Hiroe
- Published by: Shogakukan
- English publisher: NA: Viz Media
- Imprint: Sunday GX Comics
- Magazine: Monthly Sunday Gene-X
- Original run: April 19, 2002 – present
- Volumes: 14
- Light novel
- Written by: Gen Urobuchi
- Illustrated by: Rei Hiroe
- Published by: Shogakukan
- Imprint: Gagaga Bunko
- Original run: July 18, 2008 – January 18, 2011
- Volumes: 2
- Manga

Sōjiya Sawyer – Kaitai! Gore Gore Musume
- Written by: Tatsuhiko Ida
- Published by: Shogakukan
- Imprint: Sunday GX Comics
- Magazine: Monthly Sunday Gene-X
- Original run: September 19, 2019 – present
- Volumes: 11
- Manga

Eda: Initial Stage
- Written by: Hajime Yamamura
- Published by: Shogakukan
- Imprint: Sunday GX Comics
- Magazine: Monthly Sunday Gene-X
- Original run: April 19, 2022 – present
- Volumes: 8
- Anime series adaptation
- Black Lagoon (2006–2011)
- icon

Black Lagoon (stylized in all caps) is a Japanese manga series written and illustrated by Rei Hiroe. It has been published in Shogakukan's seinen manga magazine Monthly Sunday Gene-X since April 2002, with its chapters collected in 14 tankōbon volumes as of August 2026. The manga is licensed for an English release in North America by Viz Media.

The series follows the Lagoon Company, a four-member team of pirate mercenaries smuggling goods in and around the seas of Southeast Asia with their PT boat, the Black Lagoon. The group takes on various jobs, usually involving criminal organizations, and resulting in violent gunfights.

The manga received an anime television series adaptation by Madhouse, which was broadcast for two seasons of 12 episodes each in 2006, followed by a five-episode original video animation (OVA) series released from July 2010 to June 2011.

By August 2026, the Black Lagoon manga had over 10 million copies in circulation. The series has been overall well received, with critics particularly praising the action sequences.

== Plot ==
The Lagoon Company is a team of pirate mercenaries operating in the coastal waters of Southeast Asia during the early to mid-1990s. (Note: In the "El Baile de la Muerte" story arc, the tombstone of Diego Jose San Fernando Lovelace indicates his death in 1991, though the North American translation lists it as 1996. Additionally, American soldiers in the same arc are depicted using EOTech holographic sights, which were not available until the mid-to-late 1990s.) The group specializes in smuggling and transporting goods aboard their vessel, the Black Lagoon, an American-made 80-foot Elco-type PT boat. The crew consists of four members: Dutch, the seasoned leader; Revy, a skilled and ruthless gunfighter; Benny, a mechanic and computer specialist; and Rock, a former salaryman who was forcibly recruited after being abandoned by his superiors. Rock eventually adapts to his new role as the group's negotiator and public representative, leveraging his corporate background to facilitate dealings with clients.

Roanapur, a fictional port city in eastern Thailand near the Cambodian border, serves as their base of operations. The city is a lawless haven dominated by organized crime syndicates, including the Hong Kong triad, the Russian Bratva, the Colombian cartel, and the Sicilian mafia. Its streets teem with mercenaries, assassins, thieves, and prostitutes, alongside a sizable population of Vietnamese refugees who fled after the communist victory in 1975.

The Lagoon Company frequently collaborates with Hotel Moscow, the local Russian crime syndicate, undertaking high-risk missions that often escalate into violent confrontations—ranging from gunfights to naval engagements—across various Southeast Asian regions, including as far as Isabela in the Philippines. During their downtime, the crew frequents The Yellow Flag, a Roanapur bar notorious for being caught in the crossfire of frequent shootouts.

== Production ==
=== Concept and influences ===
Manga author Rei Hiroe stated that when approached by Shogakukan to develop a manga, he presented several story proposals, including Black Lagoon, which was ultimately selected. Hiroe aimed to create an action and crime series. The concept was inspired by news reports about piracy in the South China Sea during the 1990s, which he felt aligned with his goal of a "dynamic and original" narrative. He noted that pirates "know no borders and are truly free", making them an engaging subject. Initially, Hiroe considered a medieval pirate setting but shifted to a modern-day context.

Hiroe cited authors James Ellroy and Stephen King as major influences on the series's atmosphere. He also acknowledged the impact of manga artists Mikiya Mochizuki (Wild 7), Akihiro Ito (Geobreeders), and Kenichi Sonoda (Gunsmith Cats). From a visual standpoint, Hiroe was influenced by Franco-Belgian comics, particularly Soda, and admired the atmosphere and storytelling in the Spanish series Blacksad by Juan Díaz Canales and Juanjo Guarnido.

Film directors such as John Woo, Quentin Tarantino, and Robert Rodriguez also shaped Hiroe's approach, alongside 1990s Hollywood and 1980s–1990s Hong Kong triad films. Tarantino's Pulp Fiction inspired the balance of action and comedy in Black Lagoon. Although the series draws on American culture, Hiroe noted that it is filtered through a Japanese perspective, which may resonate differently with international audiences.

=== Writing and development ===
Hiroe stated that he conducted limited research on modern piracy due to scarce information, noting that the Black Lagoon crew differs from typical portrayals. However, he extensively researched weapons, utilizing encyclopedias for accuracy. Given the series's focus on mafia and military themes, Hiroe consulted documentaries and historical books, often incorporating past events for entertainment rather than current affairs. He aimed for a semblance of realism while embracing the exaggerated style of comics, as with the "Terminator-like" character Roberta.

Hiroe described manga as a medium of "still frames", requiring selection of key moments to convey action and movement. This format allows for exaggerated elements, such as oversized guns and explosions, unconstrained by realism. The publisher approved the inclusion of action and violence from the outset, and Hiroe emphasized that sensationalism is used only when plot-necessary, without allowing it to dominate the narrative.

Hiroe intended to create a story "without nationalities, without specific identities", exploring cultural reactions to criminal contexts without judgment. While the series addresses political themes, such as international conflict and poverty, it avoids singular perspectives like "America is bad" or "Russia is bad". Hiroe expressed hope that readers might discover deeper elements upon rereading, though he stated that pure entertainment is also a valid form of engagement.

Producing a chapter typically takes one month. Hiroe collaborate with his editor, Akinobu Natsume, refining plots based on feedback. Natsume noted that character introductions increased narrative complexity, requiring careful management to maintain coherence. Story arc lengths vary based on narrative needs, and Hiroe planned to use the transition to the 21st century as a significant plot device. The conclusion for each character is outlined, though execution must be consistent and well-paced.

To maintain creativity, Hiroe takes breaks during serialization, a flexibility afforded by the monthly schedule. The manga has undergone multiple hiatuses: from May 2010 to January 2013, from January 2014 to May 2017, and from August 2018 to September 2019. Hiroe attributed these pauses to struggles with depression, and stated he is progressing with the series cautiously.

=== Characters ===
Hiroe develops characters by envisioning their backgrounds, ethnicities, and affiliations, then integrating historical context. While not directly based on real individuals, film influences contribute to character shaping. The triad leader Mr. Chang was visually inspired by actor Chow Yun-fat. The prominence of armed female characters emerged organically, which Hiroe noted as a strength and appreciated by female readers.

Revy's design was inspired by George Clooney's tattooed character, Seth Gecko, in Robert Rodriguez's From Dusk till Dawn. Her impulsive personality stems from a criminal background, diverging from conventional values. As an "ordinary criminal" without heroic motives, Hiroe commented that she adds rarity and interest to the story. Her Chinese-American heritage and minority status were featured to allow readers to identify with her and to emphasize her rootless and discriminated existence. Hiroe stated that Revy is the most graphically demanding character due to her varied depictions.

Rock was introduced as an audience surrogate—a Japanese businessman among criminals. Hiroe stated that Rock's nationality was not predetermined and that, after being introduced to the story, he evolved into a central character. Anime director Sunao Katabuchi identified with Rock's breaking of societal constraints and ongoing self-conflict.

Hiroe does not oppose "cute girls" or moe elements but includes them only when relevant. Roberta's maid attire suited her affluent South American setting rather than moe trends. Katabuchi likened her combat style to "The Evil Mary Poppins" or "Death Poppins". Hiroe expanded her role beyond initial background to explore narrative possibilities.

The Hansel and Gretel twins' arc grew darker as research revealed Romania's harsh conditions during the Cold War era.

== Media ==
=== Manga ===
Written and illustrated by Rei Hiroe, the pilot chapter of Black Lagoon was published in Shogakukan's seinen manga magazine Monthly Sunday Gene-X on March 19, 2001. (Note: Chapter published in the April 2001 issue (cover date), released on March 19 of the same year.) It started its serialization in the same magazine on April 19, 2002. (Note: It started in the May 2002 issue (cover date), released on April 19 of the same year.) Shogakukan has collected its chapters into individual tankōbon volumes. The first volume was released on December 12, 2002. As of August 19, 2026, fourteen volumes have been released.

The manga is licensed for an English release in North America by Viz Media. The first volume was released on August 12, 2008. As of August 16, 2022, twelve volumes have been released. For copyright reasons, the Viz Media edition censors references to song lyrics and brand names, including gun brands. On May 9, 2023, Viz Media launched their Viz Manga digital manga service, with the series's chapters receiving simultaneous English publication in North America as they are released in Japan.

==== Spin-offs ====
A spin-off about Sawyer, titled Black Lagoon: Sōjiya Sawyer – Kaitai! Gore Gore Musume (BLACK LAGOON 掃除屋ソーヤー 解体！ゴアゴア娘; lit. 'Black Lagoon: Sawyer the Cleaner – Dismemberment! Gore Gore Girl'), illustrated by Tatsuhiko Ida, began in Monthly Sunday Gene-X on September 19, 2019. The first tankōbon volume was released on July 17, 2020. As of May 19, 2026, eleven volumes have been released.

A spin-off about Eda, titled Black Lagoon Eda: Initial Stage, illustrated by Hajime Yamamura, started in Monthly Sunday Gene-X on April 19, 2022. The first tankōbon volume was released on September 16, 2022. As of March 18, 2026, eight volumes have been released.

=== Anime ===
The manga was adapted into an anime television series animated by Madhouse, which was broadcast for twelve episodes on Chiba TV (and on other fifteen terrestrial stations) from April 9 to June 25, 2006.

A second season, Black Lagoon: The Second Barrage, consisting of twelve more episodes, ran for the first time on Sendai Television from October 3 to December 19, 2006.

A five-episode original video animation (OVA), titled Black Lagoon: Roberta's Blood Trail, which covered the "El Baile de la Muerte" arc of the manga, was released from July 17, 2010, to June 22, 2011.

=== Other media ===
Two light novels written by Gen Urobuchi, with illustrations by Hiroe, have been released under Shogakukan's Gagaga Bunko imprint. Black Lagoon: Sheitane Birdy (ブラック・ラグーン シェイターネ・バーディ, Burakku Ragūn Sheitāne Bādi) was published on July 18, 2008. Black Lagoon 2: Ballad of the Sinful Wizard (ブラック・ラグーン 2 罪深き魔術師の哀歌, Burakku Ragūn Tsu Tsumibukaki Uizādo no Barādo) was published on January 18, 2011.

An illustration book, titled Onslaught: Black Lagoon Illustrations, was released by Shogakukan on August 19, 2021. It includes the original pilot chapter illustrated pages, key visuals of the 20th anniversary exhibition and unpublished illustrations. The limited edition included a water gun replica of Revy's modified Beretta 92 FS "Sword Cutlass Special", five autographed illustrations and six bookmarks.

Four pachinko machines based on the series have been released in 2011, 2014, 2019, and 2023. Four pachislot machines have been released in 2012, 2015, 2017, and 2022. A pachislot simulator game, Slotter Mania V: Black Lagoon, was released for the PlayStation Vita on March 15, 2012.

A browser game developed by CTW for the G123 online platform, titled Black Lagoon: Heaven's Shot, was announced in September 2023 and released on December 7 of that same year.

== Reception ==
The volumes of Black Lagoon have frequently ranked as the best-selling manga volumes on Japan's weekly charts since 2007. (Note: References for each volume: Volume 7; Volume 8; Volume 9; Volume 10; Volume 11; Volume 12; Volume 13) The eighth volume was the fourteenth best-selling manga volume of 2008 in Japan. The thirteenth volume was Shogakukan's fourth highest first print run manga volume of 2023–2024 (period from April 2023 to March 2024), with 250,000 copies printed. By February 2014, the manga had over 6 million copies in circulation; over 7 million copies in circulation by November 2018; over 8.5 million copies in circulation by January 2022; over 9.5 million copies in circulation by December 2023; and over 10 million copies in circulation by August 2026.

About.com critic Deb Aoki named Viz Media's English release of Black Lagoon one of the best new seinen manga of 2008, alongside Gantz. She noted its broad appeal, comparing it to a Hollywood or Hong Kong action film rather than conventional manga tropes, and described it as a mature alternative to One Piece for readers drawn to pirate adventures. Aoki praised its portrayal of strong female characters, emphasizing their confidence and combat prowess. Leroy Douresseaux of ComicBookBin likened the series to The A-Team and a "Quentin Tarantino exploitation flick or an extra-violent version of Cowboy Bebop", also calling it "Bad Boys II on paper", suggesting it would appeal to male readers drawn to action and stylized violence. Greg McElhatton of Read About Comics commended its pacing and depth, highlighting Revy's philosophical debates with Rock as a strong point without disrupting the narrative, calling it "an action comic for people who appreciate a smart script." A.E. Sparrow of IGN praised its balance of action and character development, likening its energy to Cowboy Bebop. Isaac Hale of PopCultureShock compared it to Kouta Hirano's Hellsing, noting its stylized violence and fanservice, while praising its dynamic action sequences. Davey C. Jones of Active Anime lauded its detailed artwork and recommended it to fans of Gunsmith Cats and Cowboy Bebop.

Greg Hackmann of Mania.com described the series as unapologetically action-driven, calling it "incredibly damned entertaining" despite its simplicity. David Rasmussen of Manga Life found it enjoyable but lacking the depth of Cowboy Bebop, calling it a "decent enough action drama" without strong emotional engagement. Writer Jason Thompson likened the series to films like Rambo and The Wild Bunch, praising its dialogue but criticizing occasionally confusing action scenes. He called it a "fun ride" with moments rivaling Hellsing in intensity. Writing for Anime News Network (ANN), Thompson noted its global influences, from John Woo to Jean-Paul Sartre, calling it a truly "global manga". Theron Martin of ANN praised its high-octane action, concluding that it succeeded as a hardcore action series. Carlo Santos, also for ANN, called it cinematic but formulaic, summarizing it as "entertaining enough if you're up for some babes with guns." Rebecca Silverman, reviewing later volumes, highlighted its dark, ruleless world as its core appeal.
