= Rei Hiroe =

Japanese manga artist (born 1972)

Rei Hiroe 広江 礼威
- Born: 5 December 1972 (age 53) Kanagawa Prefecture, Japan
- Area: Manga artist
- Notable works: Black Lagoon

Rei Hiroe (広江 礼威, Hiroe Rei; born 5 December 1972) is a Japanese manga artist, best known for his manga Black Lagoon. When he is working on doujin comics, he goes by the name Red Bear. Hiroe's manga were originally published by Kadokawa Shoten in the 1990s, but none were complete. As a response, Hiroe transferred to Shogakukan in the early 2000s, where all of his manga released before Black Lagoon were republished and re-released.

== Works ==
=== Manga ===
- Hisuikyo Kitan (1992 – 1994)
- Shook Up! (1998 – 1999)
- Phantom Bullet (2000)
- Black Lagoon (2002 – ongoing)
- 341 Sentōdan (2019 – ongoing)

=== Anime ===
- Black Lagoon (2006 – 2011) – Original creator
- Re:Creators (2017) – Original story, concept and character designer

=== Light novel ===
- Black Lagoon (2008 – 2011) – Illustrator

=== Art books ===
- Barrage
- Call Mission
- Reighborhood
