= Timeline of Lego =

Lego Group logo

The Lego Group is a Danish construction toy manufacturer and media company based in Billund. It manufactures Lego-branded toys, consisting mostly of interlocking acrylonitrile butadiene styrene (ABS) plastic and rubber bricks. The Lego Group has also built several amusement parks around the world, each known as Legoland, and operates numerous retail stores. The Lego Group has its origins as a wooden toy manufacturing company founded by Ole Kirk Christiansen.

== 19th–20th century ==
- 1891:
  - Ole Kirk Christiansen, the founder of Lego, is born in Billund, Denmark.
- 1916:
  - Ole Kirk Christiansen purchases the Billund Joinery Manufacturing and Carpentry Workshop and begins his carpentry business.
- 1924:
  - Two of Ole Kirk's sons play with matches and burn down the family home and workshop. Ole Kirk rebuilds both.
- 1932:
  - Ole Kirk's workshop begins to struggle financially due to the Great Depression, and he begins to manufacture wooden toys. One of his first wooden toys, the yo-yo, sells very well for a brief period.
- 1934:
  - Ole Kirk holds a company competition to name the company. He wins it himself, ultimately choosing the name "Lego", a portmanteau of the phrase "leg godt" ("play well") in Danish.
- 1935:
  - The first Lego wooden duck toy and the first Lego construction toy are released.
- 1937:
  - Ole Kirk coins the first company motto: "det bedste er ikke for godt" ("only the best is good enough").
  - Godtfred Kirk Christiansen begins designing models for Lego at 17 years old.
- 1939:
  - The company grows to 10 employees.
- 1942:
  - A fire destroys the Lego factory, forcing the company to rebuild. Ole Kirk remakes all of the lost toy designs.
- 1943:
  - The company grows to 29 employees.
- 1946:
  - Lego begins producing wooden blocks with painted letters and numbers.
- 1947:
  - Ole Kirk imports a plastic injection-molding machine from the United Kingdom, and the company begins manufacturing plastic toys, including a plastic ball and an educational game called Monypoli.
- 1948:
  - The company grows to 63 employees.
  - Lego produces a pinball game.
- 1949:
  - Lego begins producing plastic bricks, calling them "Automatic Binding Bricks." The bricks are inspired by samples of the "Kiddicraft Self-Locking Building Brick", a design patented by the Briton Hilary Fisher Page.
- 1950:
  - Godtfried Kirk Christiansen is appointed as Junior Managing Director of Lego.
- 1952
  - The Lego Ferguson Tractor toy launches.
  - A new Lego manufacturing plant is built.
- 1953:
  - Automatic Binding Bricks are renamed Lego Mursten, or "Lego Bricks."
- 1954:
  - The name "Lego" is registered as a trademark in Denmark.
  - Lego introduces brick-compatible window and door elements.
  - Godtfred Kirk has the idea to create the "Lego System" of construction sets.
- 1955:
  - Lego releases its first building "System" of the Town Plan along with 28 other sets.
- 1956:
  - A sales company for Lego is built in Hohenwestedt, Germany.
- 1957:
  - Lego releases bricks with lights and plastic Volkswagen Beetle models in eight colors.
  - The Lego brick design is updated with a new stud and tube-based interlocking system that improves stability.
- 1958:
  - The Lego brick design is patented in Denmark on January 28.
  - Ole Kirk Christiansen dies; Godtfred inherits leadership of the Lego Company.
  - The company in Billund grows to 140 employees.
- 1959:
  - A small staff at Lego, the "Futura" division, is established to develop ideas for new sets.
  - Lego divisions are founded in France, the United Kingdom, Belgium, and Sweden.
- 1960:
  - A fire destroys Lego's wooden toy workshop, and a decision is made to stop producing wooden toys and pivot entirely to the Lego System.
  - Lego divisions are founded in Finland and the Netherlands.
  - The company in Billund grows to approximately 400 employees.
- 1961:
  - Godtfried Kirk buys a company airplane and a landing field is built outside of Billund.
  - Lego licenses toys to Samsonite for sale in the United States and Canada.
  - The first Lego preschool lines are launched.
  - Lego Italy is established.
- 1962:
  - Lego begins selling toys in Singapore, Hong Kong, Australia, Morocco, and Japan.
  - Lego Australia is established.
  - A Lego wheel element is introduced to the Lego System.
- 1963:
  - Cellulose acetate is abandoned in favor of the more stable ABS plastic in making Lego bricks.
  - Lego model sets with building instructions begin being produced.
  - Lego Austria is established.
- 1964:
  - Lego products begin being sold in the Middle East.
  - Lego toys are exhibited at 1964 New York World's Fair.
  - The Ole Kirk Foundation is established to support the arts.
- 1965:
  - Lego products begin to be sold in Spain.
  - The company in Billund grows to more than 600 employees.
- 1966:
  - The first battery-powered Lego train sets are released.
  - The first official Lego Club begins in Canada.
  - Lego is now sold in 42 countries.
- 1967:
  - Over 18 million Lego sets are sold in the year.
  - The Lego Duplo system is patented.
  - A Lego Club forms in Sweden.
- 1968:
  - Legoland Billund Resort opens.
  - Lego Duplo is test-marketed in Sweden.
- 1969:
  - The Lego Duplo range, designed for children under five years old, is launched internationally.
  - A 12-volt motor is added to Lego train products.
- 1970:
  - The company grows to 1,000 employees in Billund.
  - Small, inexpensive Lego car sets are launched.
- 1971:
  - Lego introduces furniture pieces and dollhouses marketed towards girls.
- 1972:
  - 1.8 billion Lego bricks and other System elements have been produced.
- 1973:
  - A new Lego logo is introduced.
  - The first Lego boat designed to float is released.
  - Lego Systems Inc. USA and Lego Portugal are established.
- 1974:
  - Posable Lego people figures are introduced.
  - A Lego brick replica of Mount Rushmore is built in Legoland Billund by Bjørn Richter.
  - Lego Spain is established.
- 1975:
  - The company grows to 2,560 employees.
  - The Expert Series of vintage car sets are introduced.
  - Lego USA relocates from Brookfield, Connecticut, to Enfield, Connecticut.
  - Small, non-posable Lego figures are introduced.
- 1977:
  - The Lego Technic series is launched.
  - Lego Duplo sets with door, window, and figurine elements are introduced.
- 1978:
  - Lego introduces the minifigure with movable limbs and hands that can grasp utensils.
  - The Lego Castle, Lego Space, and Lego Town themes are introduced.
  - A Lego Club is founded in the UK, and a club magazine titled Bricks 'n' Pieces is launched.
  - Lego Japan is established.
- 1979:
  - Kjeld Kirk Kristiansen becomes president and CEO of Lego.
  - Lego introduces the Fabuland and Scala themes.
- 1980:
  - Lego establishes the Educational Products Department.
  - The Lego Duplo rabbit logo is introduced.
  - 70% of Western European families with children under 14 now own Lego toys.
- 1981:
  - The first Lego World Show takes place in Denmark.
- 1982:
  - The Lego Group celebrates its 50th anniversary.
  - Lego South Africa is established.
- 1983:
  - Lego launches the Duplo Baby series.
  - The company grows to 3,700 employees worldwide.
- 1984:
  - The first international Lego building competition is held in Billund. Children from 11 countries participate.
  - Lego Brazil and Lego Korea are established.
  - The Black Falcon and Crusader factions are added to Lego Castle.
- 1985:
  - Lego company grows to 5,000 employees worldwide.
  - The Lego Prize is founded as an international annual award for efforts on behalf of children.
- 1986:
  - Lego Technic Computer Control products launch in schools.
  - Light and sound kits are launched in the Lego Town and Space themes.
  - The Lego Group is granted the title of "Purveyor to Her Majesty the Queen" on the birthday of Margrethe II.
- 1987:
  - The Lego Club starts in Germany, Austria, Switzerland, France, and Norway.
  - Buckets of loose Lego System and Duplo bricks are sold.
  - The official Lego Club magazine, Brick Kicks, is sold in the US.
  - The motorized Lego Space Monorail Transport System is launched.
  - The Lego Space subthemes Blacktron and Futuron are launched.
- 1988:
  - The first Lego World Cup building contest is held in Billund.
  - Lego Canada is established.
  - An art exhibition titled "Art of Lego" tours the United Kingdom.
- 1989:
  - The Lego Pirates theme and Lego Space Police theme are launched.
  - Ole Kirk Christiansen is inducted into the Toy Industry Hall of Fame in the US.
- 1990
  - The Lego Group is now one of the world's 10 largest toy manufacturers.
  - Lego Malaysia is established.
  - The Model Team and Lego Duplo Zoo themes are launched.
- 1991
  - The company now has 7,550 employees and 1,000 injection-molding machines across five Lego factories.
  - The Lego Town Harbor and Lego Town Nautica themes are introduced.
  - Lego Technic flex-system elements and transformer-controlled 9-volt trains are introduced.
  - The Lego System Brick Vac is introduced to vacuum loose bricks off of floors.
- 1992
  - The first Lego Imagination Center is opened in Mall of America in Bloomington, Minnesota, US.
  - The world's largest Lego castle is built on Swedish television using over 400,000 bricks.
  - The second Lego World Cup Final is held in Billund.
  - The Lego Paradisa and Res-Q subthemes of Lego Town are introduced.
- 1993
  - A Lego building event is held in Red Square in Moscow, Russia.
  - The Ice Planet subtheme of Lego Space is introduced.
- 1994
  - The United Nations Commission on Human Rights uses Lego minifigures in an awareness campaign.
  - The Lego Belville theme is launched.
  - Lego Mexico is established.
  - Lego products are advertised for the first time on television in China.
  - The company has 8,880 employees worldwide.
  - The Brick Kicks magazine is renamed to Lego Mania.
- 1995
  - Lego Aquazone and Lego Primo are introduced.
  - Weekly Lego programs are aired on Latvian and Lithuanian television.
  - Lego events and exhibitions take place in Latvia, Peru, Hungary, Switzerland, Denmark, Greenland, the United States, Canada, Italy, and Ecuador.
- 1996
  - Legoland Windsor is opened in the United Kingdom.
  - The official Lego website is launched.
  - The Lego Western and Lego Time Cruisers themes are launched.
- 1997
  - Lego releases its first computer game, Lego Island.
  - A new Lego Imagination Center opens in Disney Village, Florida.
  - The first Lego Mindstorms Learning Center opens in the Museum of Science and Industry in Chicago, Illinois.
  - Over 3,000 children participate in a Lego building event held at Grand Kremlin Palace in Moscow, Russia.
  - The Lego Kids Wear shop opens in Oxford Street, London, UK.
- 1998
  - Lego adopts a new logo as well as the new slogan, "Just Imagine..."
  - Japanese Emperor Akihito and Empress Michiko visit Legoland Billund.
  - The Lego Mindstorms, Znap, Space Insectoids, and Adventurers lines are launched.
- 1999
  - Legoland California opens in Carlsbad, California.
  - Lego produces the first licensed theme with Lucasfilm based on Star Wars.
  - New themes include Rock Raiders and Duplo Winnie-the-Pooh.
  - The magazine Fortune names the Lego brick as one of the "products of the century".
  - The Lego World Shop opens on the Lego website.

== 21st century ==
- 2000
  - The British Toy Retailers Association names the Lego brick the "Toy of the Century".
  - The Lego Studios, Sports, Baby Mickey, Knights Kingdom, Mosaic, Wheelers, Writing, Arctic, and Dino Island themes launch.
- 2001
  - The Lego Bionicle, Alpha Team, Harry Potter, Jack Stone, Dinosaurs, Racers, and Life on Mars themes are launched.
  - Lego Serious Play is founded.
- 2002
  - The company slogan changes from "Just Imagine..." to "Play On".
  - Lego themes based on Spider-Man and Bob the Builder are introduced.
  - The Lego Mania magazine is rebranded to Lego Magazine.
  - Lego Duplo is rebranded to Lego Explore.
  - Lego stores open in Germany, the UK, and Russia.
  - Lego Galidor is introduced. The tie-in television series Galidor: Defenders of the Outer Dimension launches.
  - The Lego video game Island Xtreme Stunts is released.
- 2003
  - Lego introduces realistic skin tones for minifigures based on actual people.
  - The Lego Sports NBA Basketball and Hockey themes are launched.
  - The Lego Clikits, Designer, Gravity Games, and Dora the Explorer themes are launched.
  - Lego NASA sets are released. Pictures of Lego minifigures named Biff Starling and Sandy Moondust are sent to Mars on the Mars Exploration Rover mission.
  - Lego Town is rebranded to Lego World City.
  - The first full-length CGI Lego movie, Bionicle: Mask of Light, is released on DVD.
  - The Little Robots television show and toys launch.
- 2004
  - Lego Knights Kingdom II is introduced.
  - Lego Explore is replaced by Lego Duplo, Quatro, and Baby.
  - The US Lego Club launches the Lego BrickMaster program.
  - Jørgen Vig Knudstorp is appointed CEO of the Lego Group.
  - The second full-length CGI Lego movie, Bionicle 2: Legends of Metru Nui is released on DVD.
  - The Lego Group partners with Ferrari to make licensed car model sets.
- 2005
  - The Lego System celebrates its 50th anniversary.
  - The Lego Group sells the Legoland parks to Merlin Entertainments.
  - Lego Star Wars: The Video Game is released.
  - Lego Star Wars: Revenge of the Brick airs on television.
  - The film Bionicle 3: Web of Shadows is released.
  - Lego World City is rebranded to Lego City.
  - The Lego Dino Attack, Dino 2010, Thomas and Friends, Vikings, and Tiny Turbos themes launch.
  - The Lego Ambassador program is created.
- 2006
  - The Lego Exo-Force, Batman, Avatar: The Last Airbender, and SpongeBob SquarePants themes are introduced.
  - The video game Lego Star Wars II: The Original Trilogy releases.
- 2007
  - The Lego Aqua Raiders, Mars Mission, Modular Buildings, and Creator themes are introduced.
  - Lego Castle is reintroduced.
  - Lego Star Wars: The Complete Saga releases.
- 2008
  - Kjeld Kirk Kristiansen is inducted into the Toy Industry Hall of Fame.
  - Lego Magazine is rebranded as Lego Club Magazine.
  - The Lego Club Jr. magazine is launched for young readers.
  - The Lego Indiana Jones, Lego Speed Racer, Lego Agents, and Lego Architecture themes are launched.
  - Lego Indiana Jones: The Original Adventures and Lego Batman: The Videogame release.
  - Legoland Discovery Center Chicago opens.
- 2009
  - Lego Power Miners is introduced.
  - Lego Games are introduced.
  - The video games Lego Indiana Jones 2: The Adventure Continues and Lego Rock Band release.
  - Lego Muji is introduced.
- 2010
  - The Lego Toy Story, Cars, Prince of Persia, Atlantis, World Racers, Hero Factory, and Ben 10 themes are launched.
  - The first generation of Lego Bionicle ends after the release of six commemorative sets containing golden armor for the character Tahu.
  - The video games Lego Harry Potter: Years 1–4 and Lego Universe are released.
  - The direct-to-video film Lego: The Adventures of Clutch Powers is released.
- 2011
  - The Lego Ninjago, Pirates of the Caribbean, Alien Conquest, and Life of George themes are launched.
  - The Lego City Space theme is reintroduced with collaboration from NASA.
  - The Lego Master Builders Academy program is introduced.
  - Legoland Florida opens.
  - Lego sets are launched into space aboard the Space Shuttle Endeavour.
  - The Lego Cuusoo program launches, allowing fans to submit and vote on models to become official sets.
  - The video games Lego Pirates of the Caribbean: The Video Game and Lego Harry Potter: Years 5–7 are released.
  - Lego Rebrick, a social media platform for Lego fans over 13 years old, launches.
- 2012
  - The Lego Super Heroes, Lord of the Rings, Friends, Dino, Monster Fighters, and Disney Princess themes are released.
  - Legoland Malaysia opens.
  - Lego Cuusoo voting leads to the production of a Lego set based on Minecraft.
- 2013
  - The Lego Legends of Chima, Galaxy Squad, Lone Ranger, and Teenage Mutant Ninja Turtles, themes launch.
  - 5,000 Mr. Gold minifigures are released to celebrate the 35th anniversary of the Lego minifigure.
  - The Lego Creator Expert label is introduced fir advanced building sets.
  - Lego Minecraft is introduced as its own theme after having previously gotten a set through Lego Cuusoo.
- 2014
  - The Lego Movie and an accompanying theme are released.
  - The Lego Mixels, Juniors, and Ultra Agents themes launch.
  - A Lego-themed episode of The Simpsons releases to tie in with the release of the Lego The Simpsons theme.
- 2015
  - Bionicle is reintroduced.
  - The Lego Speed Champions, Scooby-Doo, Jurassic World, and Elves themes launch.
  - The video game Lego Dimensions releases.
- 2016
  - The Lego Nexo Knights theme is introduced.
  - Animated shows based on Lego Bionicle and Lego Friends debut on Netflix.
  - Thomas Kirk Kristiansen becomes owner of the Lego Group.
  - The world's largest Lego Store opens in Leicester Square, London, UK.
  - A new Lego factory opens in Jiaxing, China.
- 2017
  - The Lego Batman Movie and The Lego Ninjago Movie are released theatrically.
  - Niels Christiansen becomes CEO.
  - The video game Lego Worlds is released.
  - The Lego Boost, Lego BrickHeadz, and Lego DC Super Hero Girls lines debut.
  - The Lego House opens to the public in Billund.
  - The Lego Club rebrands as Lego Life.
- 2018
  - Special sets are released to commemorate 60 years since the patent of the Lego brick.
  - The animated series Unikitty! premiers on Cartoon Network.
  - Lego bricks made with plant-based plastics begin production.
- 2019
  - The Lego Movie 2: The Second Part is released.
  - Lego Hidden Side is introduced.
  - The Lego Group acquires BrickLink for an undisclosed amount.
- 2020
  - The show Lego Masters debuts in the United States.
- 2021
  - The Lego Ninjago theme celebrates its tenth anniversary.
- 2022
  - The Lego Friends theme celebrates its tenth anniversary.
  - Lego Avatar is introduced.
- 2023
  - The Lego Sonic the Hedgehog, Gabby's Dollhouse, and Dreamzzz themes are introduced.
  - Lego Fortnite is launched.
- 2024
  - Lego Star Wars celebrates its 25th anniversary, and commemorative sets are released.
  - A Lego theme based on Animal Crossing is introduced.
- 2025
  - Lego themes based on One Piece and Star Trek are introduced.
- 2026
  - A Lego theme based based on the Pokémon franchise is introduced.
