= List of Lego themes =

Lego products are divided in series of sets known as themes, which are based around a specific license or concept. This article contains an inexhaustive list of themes released by The Lego Group, both currently produced and discontinued. Many themes are also based on preexisting licensed properties or media franchises.

== Current themes ==
=== Original ===
- Lego Architecture: A product line featuring small-scale recreations of real buildings.
- Lego Art: A product line featuring artistic designs, often featuring mosaic-like portraits designed using small tiles.
- Lego Botanicals
- Lego BrickHeadz: A product line featuring large buildable figurines, often based on licensed properties.
- Lego City: A brand of sets taking place within a large city environment. The product line contains many subthemes. It was previously known as Lego Town until 2003, and as Lego World City from 2003 to 2004.
- Lego Classic
- Lego Creator: A Lego theme featuring generic models. Sets released Creator 3in1 allow multiple builds to be created with the same set.
- BrickLink Designer Program: A crowdfunding program ran through BrickLink where sets designed by Lego fans are produced for a limited time.
- Lego Duplo
- Lego Editions
- Lego Education
- Lego Friends
- Lego Icons: A Lego theme featuring more advanced models intended for older audiences. The product line includes the Modular Buildings series, featuring large connectable models of urban buildings. It was known as Lego Creator Expert until 2020.
- Lego Ideas
- Lego Minifigures
- Lego Monkie Kid
- Lego Ninjago
- Lego Speed Champions: A racing theme introduced in 2015 featuring models of vehicles from well-known car brands.
- Lego Technic: A Lego theme featuring sets designed using unique gears primarily consisting of machines and vehicles. It was introduced in 1977.

=== Licensed ===
- Lego Animal Crossing: A Lego theme introduced in 2024 based off the Animal Crossing video game series.
- Lego Bluey: A Lego theme released in 2025 based on the television series Bluey.
- Lego DC Super Heroes (Batman): A product line based on the DC Comics superhero universe, including many sets featuring the superhero Batman.
- Lego Disney: A Lego theme featuring sets based on various Disney properties as well as the Disney Princess line.
- Lego Dune
- Lego Fortnite
- Lego Gabby's Dollhouse: A Lego theme released in 2023 based on the Gabby's Dollhouse television series.
- Lego Harry Potter
- Lego Horizon
- Lego Jurassic World
- Lego KPop Demon Hunters
- Lego Looney Tunes
- Lego The Lord of the Rings
- Lego Marvel Super Heroes (Spider-Man): A Lego theme featuring sets based on the Marvel Comics superhero universe.
- Lego Minecraft: A series of sets first introduced in 2012 based on the sandbox game Minecraft.
- Lego Nike
- Lego One Piece
- Lego Pokémon
- Lego Shrek: A product line based on DreamWorks Animation's Shrek franchise.
- Lego The Simpsons: A series of sets based on the animated television series. Three sets have been released.
- Lego Sonic the Hedgehog
- Lego Star Wars
- Lego Stranger Things
- Lego Super Mario
- Lego The Legend of Zelda
- Lego Wednesday
- Lego Wicked

== Discontinued themes ==
=== Original ===
- Lego 4+
- Lego Adventurers
- Lego Agents
- Lego Alpha Team
- Lego Aqua Raiders
- Lego Aquazone
- Lego Atlantis
- Lego Baby
- Lego Belville
- Lego Boost: A robotic programming kit released in 2017 for younger audiences, similar to Mindstorms.
- Bionicle
- Lego Brick Sketches
- Lego Castle
- Lego Clikits
- Lego Design byME
- Lego Dimensions: A toys-to-life video game released in 2015. Expansion sets which could be connected to the game were released until 2017, when the product line was cancelled.
- Lego Dino
- Lego Dino Attack
- Lego Dino 2010
- Lego DOTS: An arts and crafts theme released in 2020 with customizable builds. It was discontinued in 2023.
- Lego Elves
- Lego Exo-Force
- Lego Fabuland
- Lego FORMA
- Lego Fusion: A line of augmented reality sets released in 2014. Builds could be interacted with in a series of mobile games.
- Galidor
- Lego Games: A series of playable board games built with Lego released from 2009 to 2013.
- Lego Hero Factory
- Lego Hidden Side
- Lego Homemaker
- Island Xtreme Stunts: A series of sets based on the 2002 video game.
- Lego Jack Stone
- Lego Juniors: A product line released in 2014 for younger builders. The theme was retired in 2018 and replaced with the standard 4+ label on sets.
- Lego Legends of Chima
- Lego Life of George: A Lego theme connected to the Life of George mobile app, which was released in 2011.
- Lego Mindstorms
- Lego Mixels
- Lego Monster Fighters
- The Lego Movie
- Lego Nexo Knights
- Lego Ninja
- The Lego Ninjago Movie
- Lego Pharaoh's Quest
- Lego Pirates
- Lego Power Miners
- Lego Quatro
- Lego Racers
- Lego Rock Raiders
- Lego Space
- Lego Sports
- Lego Spybotics
- Lego Studios: A product line released in 2000 which allowed people to create their own movies. The main set came with a camera and software.
- Lego Time Cruisers
- Lego Ultra Agents
- Lego Unikitty!: A theme released in 2018 based off the Unikitty! television series.
- Lego Vidiyo: A Lego theme released along the Lego Vidiyo app, where augmented reality could be used to create and upload music videos. The theme was retired in 2022 after being deemed a commercial failure.
- Lego Vikings
- Lego Wild West
- Lego World Racers
- Lego Znap
- Lego Dreamzzz

=== Licensed ===
- Lego The Angry Birds Movie: A product line released in 2016 based on The Angry Birds Movie, itself based on Rovio Entertainment's Angry Birds video game franchise.
- Lego Avatar
- Lego Avatar: The Last Airbender: A Lego theme based on the Nickelodeon television series. Two sets were released.
- The Lego Batman Movie
- Lego Ben 10: Alien Force
- Lego Cars
- Lego DC Super Hero Girls: A Lego theme introduced in 2017 based on the DC Super Hero Girls web series. It was retired in 2018.
- Lego Despicable Me
- Lego Ghostbusters
- Lego Indiana Jones: A product line based on the Indiana Jones film franchise available from 2008 to 2009. It was reintroduced in 2023.
- Lego Mickey Mouse
- Lego Minions
- Lego Overwatch
- Lego Pirates of the Caribbean
- Lego Prince of Persia
- Lego Scooby-Doo: A product line introduced in 2015 based off Warner Bros. Scooby-Doo franchise. It was retired in 2016.
- Lego Speed Racer: A series of sets based on the 2008 film.
- Lego SpongeBob SquarePants: A product line released from 2006 to 2012 based on the animated television series. It was reintroduced as a LEGO Icons set in 2026.
- Lego Teenage Mutant Ninja Turtles: A product line available from 2012 to 2014 based on the Teenage Mutant Ninja Turtles franchise.
- Lego The Lone Ranger:
- Lego The Powerpuff Girls: A Lego theme released in 2018 based on the 2016 animated television series of the same name.
- Lego Trolls World Tour: A product line released in 2020 based on DreamWorks' Animation's Trolls franchise.
