= Lego Fusion =

Lego theme

- Subject: The combination of construction sets and game app
- Availability: August 2014–July 2015
- Total sets: 4
- Official website

Lego Fusion was a Lego theme that combined standard Lego bricks with a mobile app (for iOS and Android) that was designed to interact and communicate with the build models according to the principle of augmented reality. The theme was first introduced on 1 August 2014 and exclusively in North America. It was eventually discontinued by the end of July 2015.

== Overview ==
The Lego Fusion product line focuses on the combination of construction sets and game app to create the digital worlds with the smart-phones or tablets. This has been described by The Lego Group as "fluid play". Users create their own 2D models and scan by using an app named Lego Fusion. The product line includes Lego Fusion toy sets that each contain Lego bricks, Fusion capture plate and connect to the app. The toy sets are marketed at children aged 7 to 12 years old.

== Development ==
Lego Fusion was developed by Lego Future Lab, Lego Fusion was invented as a way to marry digital and analog play. Lego Future Lab also used Qualcomm's Vuforia mobile vision platform for this process. Lego Future Lab senior design manager Ditte Bruun Pedersen explained, "To them, it's not two separate worlds. It's one world that blends together. It's all just play."

Lego Fusion used the combination of construction sets and scanning with a smart-phone or tablet to create digital worlds.

== Construction sets ==
According to BrickLink, The Lego Group released a total of 4 Lego sets as part of Lego Fusion theme. The product line was eventually discontinued by the end of July 2015.

Lego Fusion was released on 1 August 2014 in North America. As part of the marketing campaign, the Lego Group released three Lego Fusion sets alongside the theme's associated app. The next month, Resort Designer (set number: 21208) alongside the theme's associated app was released on 1 September 2014.

=== Town Master ===
Town Master (set number: 21204) was released on 1 August 2014 and based on Lego City theme. The set consists of 258 pieces with a Fusion capture plate and one minifigure. It enables children to create 2D house models by placing bricks on the Fusion capture plate, scanning with the smartphone or tablet and playing with the Lego Fusion Town Master app to unlock their own game levels. The set included a Lego minifigure of Mayor. Lego Fusion Town Master app included the game levels of Lego City theme.

=== Battle Towers ===
Battle Towers (set number: 21205) was released on 1 August 2014 and based on Lego Castle theme. The set consists of 212 pieces with a Fusion capture plate. It enables children to create 2D tower models by placing bricks on the Fusion capture plate, scanning with the smartphone or tablet and playing with the Lego Fusion Battle Towers app to unlock their own game levels. Lego Fusion Battle Towers app included the game levels of Lego Castle theme.

=== Create and Race ===
Create and Race (set number: 21206) was released on 1 August 2014 and based on Lego Racers theme. The set consists of 223 pieces with a Fusion capture plate. It enables children to create 2D race car models by placing bricks on the Fusion capture plate, scanning with the smartphone or tablet and playing with the Lego Fusion Create and Race app to unlock their own game levels. Lego Fusion Create and Race app included the game levels of Lego Racers theme.

=== Resort Designer ===
Resort Designer (set number: 21208) was released on 1 September 2014 and based on Lego Friends theme. The set consists of 263 pieces with a Fusion capture plate and one mini-doll figure. It enables children to create a 2D house model by placing bricks on the Fusion capture plate, scanning with a smartphone or tablet and playing with the Lego Fusion Resort Designer app to unlock game levels. The set included a Lego mini-doll figure of Olivia. Lego Fusion Resort Designer app included the game levels of Lego Friends theme. The set was designed primarily for girls aged 7 to 12 years old.

== Apps ==
The 3 Lego Fusion apps were released on 13 August 2014 and Lego Fusion Resort Designer app was released on 1 September 2014. Each of the Lego Fusion apps was based on different Lego themes. Each of the Lego Fusion apps allows the user to select the game levels, build the construction set by place in a Fusion capture plate, scan the Fusion capture plate with the game app and play the game levels.

== Reception ==
In 2014, Will Greenwald of PCMag gave Town Master (set number: 21204) a 3.5 out of 5.

In 2015, Lego Fusion product line sold well and was listed as one of the 15 hottest Christmas toys by Toys "R" Us, describing it as, "at best a 1.0 version of a digital-physical play experience."

== Awards and nominations ==
In 2015, Lego Fusion was awarded "Toy of the Year" and also "E-Connected Toy" by the Toy Association.

== See also ==
- Lego City
- Lego Castle
- Lego Racers
- Lego Friends
- Lego Life of George
- Lego Ultra Agents
- Nexo Knights
- Lego BrickHeadz
- Lego Hidden Side
- Lego Super Mario
- Lego Vidiyo
