= Lego Life of George =

Lego theme

- Subject: The combination of construction sets and game app
- Availability: October 2011–December 2013
- Total sets: 2
- Official website

Lego Life of George is a discontinued Lego theme that for the first time, combined standard Lego bricks with a mobile app (for iOS and Android). The theme was first introduced in October 2011. It was eventually discontinued by the end of December 2013.

== Overview ==
Lego Life of George was the first Lego product line designed to provide an experience that combines both physical and digital play. This has been described by The Lego Group as "fluid play". Users built their own 2D models as fast as possible and scanned them by using an app named Life of George. The product line included Life of George toy sets that contained 144 pieces of Lego bricks, a play mat and an app. The toy sets were marketed at children aged 8+ or above.

== Development ==
Lego Life of George was developed by EyeCue, an Israeli technology company. The patented brick recognition technology was invented by Ronen Horovitz, CEO and founder of EyeCue. Head of the New Business Group at Lego, Paal Smith-Meyer explained, "For some the main driver was to see how can the digital really inspire kids to build more and play more physically," and continued, "So we're looking at this kind of play loop where you create something and then use it in a digital space and that play would then inspire you to go back, physically, and play more.”

== Construction sets ==
According to BrickLink, The Lego Group released a total of two Lego sets as part of the Lego Life of George theme. The product line was eventually discontinued by the end of 2013.

Lego Life of George was launched on 1 October 2011. As part of the marketing campaign, The Lego Group released Life of George 1 (set number: 21200) alongside the theme's associated app. In 2012, The Lego Group released Life of George 2 (set number: 21201) an upgraded version alongside the theme's associated app. Both sets contained 144 pieces of Lego bricks, a play mat, "Getting Started" guide, George sticker and an app.

== Apps ==
=== Life of George ===
An app titled Life of George was a puzzle video game developed by The Lego Group for the operating systems iOS and Android. It was released on 1 October 2011. The game mode featured 1 player and 2 player mode. It had 12 game levels for Life of George 1 (set number: 21200) and 13 game levels for Life of George 2 (set number: 21201). A Creation Mode named "My life" allowed builders to keep their own album of models and creations. It also sent the images to other the users in the app. The Life of George app was discontinued on 1 February 2015.

=== Build Your Brain ===
An app titled Build Your Brain was the second puzzle video game developed by The Lego Group for the operating systems iOS and Android. It was released on 3 August 2012. The game mode included multiplayer mode. The challenge mode included Silhouette challenges, Logic puzzles, Bonus modes, Memory challenges and Shape Finding. The Build Your Brain app was discontinued on 1 February 2015.

== Awards and nominations ==
In 2013, Lego Life of George was nominated "Toy of the Year" and also "E-Connected Toy" by the Toy Association.

The app won the 2012 SXSW Interactive Awards in the "Amusement" category.

== See also ==
- Lego Fusion
- Lego Ultra Agents
- Nexo Knights
- Lego BrickHeadz
- Lego Hidden Side
- Lego Super Mario
- Lego Vidiyo
