= OGEL =

OGEL may refer to:

- Oil, Gas and Energy Law, an academic journal
- Open general export licence, a licence permitting low-risk exports
- Olivier Giscard d'Estaing Library in Kazakhstan's KIMEP University
- Ogel, fictional character from Lego Alpha Team themed sets and games
