= N&B Block =

Discontinued construction toy by Nintendo

- Various N&B Block sets
- Other names: Nintendo Block
- Type: Construction set
- Company: Nintendo
- Country: Japan
- Availability: 1968–1972

N&B Block (Japanese: N&Bブロック), also known as Nintendo Block (Japanese: 任天堂ブロック), is a discontinued brand of construction set toys produced by Nintendo from 1968 to 1972.

== History ==
Due to the success of the Ultra Hand toy, Nintendo established a department in 1966 to produce more toys. First released in 1968, N&B Block was marketed as a direct competitor to Lego. N&B Block was distinguished through the use of round and cylindrical pieces, which were not used widely by Lego at the time. Hiroshi Yamauchi heavily invested in television advertisements that directly compared the two products, and over 40 N&B Block sets were released. N&B Block was cheaper than Lego, making use of lower-quality plastic. One of the first sets released was a Garden House set from 1968 and it cost ¥980 (equivalent to ¥3,891 in 2024). The lower price of N&B Block made the product popular among children that could not afford Lego sets.

Satoru Okada began working on N&B Block as his first assignment at Nintendo in 1969. Okada and Gunpei Yokoi both designed several sets, including one based on the Apollo 11 moon landing in 1969. For this set, Yokoi created a springy piece that caused a moon rover to flip over and fall apart. N&B Block is compatible with Lego bricks, but features a different form of underside tubing for block connections. Some N&B Block sets feature electronic elements such as clocks.

Lego filed a lawsuit against Nintendo over alleged patent violation, but Nintendo won the lawsuit due to the unique tubing on the underside of N&B Block that differentiated the blocks from Lego bricks. Nintendo ceased production of N&B Block in 1972. The reason for which Nintendo cancelled the product is not publicly known, but Time Extension has noted speculation that this was the result of mounting legal pressure from Lego. The 1992 Nintendo video game Super Mario Land 2: 6 Golden Coins features a level constructed from N&B Blocks. Lego and Nintendo would later collaborate to launch Lego themes based on Nintendo properties, starting with Lego Super Mario in 2020.
