= Lego Ultra Agents =

Lego theme

- Parent theme: Lego Agents
- Subject: Agents
- Availability: 2014–2015
- Total sets: 14
- Official website

Lego Ultra Agents is a discontinued Lego theme that was first introduced in June 2014 after the discontinued Lego Agents theme. The theme was inspired by James Bond as well as various spy movies. The theme was considered to be a development or upgrade from the 2008 Lego Agents theme. The theme's 14 toy sets were released in three waves and were accompanied by a free app. Lego Ultra Agents was discontinued by the end of 2015.

== Overview ==
The Lego Ultra Agents product line focused on a group of fictional Ultra Agents and their mission to stop AntiMatter and his evil villains from attacking Astor City.

== Development ==
Lego Ultra Agents was an updated version of the previous Lego Agents theme, which was released in 2008, Lego Agents itself was also an update of Lego Alpha Team. Lego Ultra Agents included some of the original high-tech spy concepts of the Lego Agents and Alpha Team themes, but also introduced a storyline and a series of secret build instructions for the Lego sets that were delivered through the app.

== Launch ==
The Lego Ultra Agents theme was launched at the American International Toy Fair in 2014. As part of the initial launch, The Lego Group released six Ultra Agents Lego sets alongside the theme's associated app.

== Characters ==
=== Ultra Agents ===
- Agent Curtis Bolt: He is the inventor of the Ultra Agents.
- Agent Caila Phoenix: She is a martial artist and a demolitions expert.
- Agent Jack Fury: He is the thrill-seeking often reckless daredevil.
- Agent Max Burns: He is the Rookie Agent and the professional driver of the Ultra Agents. Later, he is promoted to an Elite Agent.
- Agent Solomon Blaze: He is the former member of the Galaxy Squad.
- Agent Trey Swift: Professor Brainstein's Scooter.
- Agent Steve Zeal: He is a member of the Ultra Agents.
- Astor City Guard: The law enforcement of the Astor City.
- Astor City Scientist: The Scientist of the Astor City Lab.
- Professor Christina Hydron: The Scientist of the Ultra Agents.
- Professor Brainstein: He is a member of the Astor City Research team and Agent Curtis Bolt's mentor. Later, he became a villain with a 4-legged mech suit.
- P.U.P.(Prototype Unmanned Patrol): The robotic dog.

=== Villains ===
- Adam Acid: He is a former harbor master who became Toxikita's henchman.
- AntiMatter: His real name is Morgan Lux, is a former Ultra Agent and main antagonist of the Lego Ultra Agents series. An accident involving a crime-fighting tool transformed him into the evil AntiMatter, a compound of a thousand criminals. Seeking to take over Astor City, he invented a staff that allows him to open portals that "reverse the polarity" of a person, transforming them into their evil clone.
- Infearno: He is a former firefighter who became a villain with a flamethrower and a flaming hoverboard.
- Psyclone: He is a former weathercaster who became a villain with giant silver propellers on his back.
- Retox: Toxikita's henchman.
- Terabyte: He is a former IT specialist who became a computer hacker and his plan is to hack Astor City's computer systems.
- Toxikita: She is a former environmentalist who became a villainess and her plan is to spill toxic waste into the ocean. (Note: She is known as Tox in Ninjago (TV series).)
- Tremor: His real name is Louis Lightweight. Tremor is a villain with heavy armor and flat fists.
- Spyclops: He is a former exterminator who became a villain with robotic spider arms and portable venom spray.
- Invizable: He is a former rock star who became the invisible man. (Note: He is known as Mr. Pale or Paleman in Ninjago (TV series).)
- Drillex: He is a former construction safety supervisor who became a villain with armor with twin drill hands.
- SharX: AntiMatter's personal bodyguard.
- Electrolyzer: He is a former electrician who became a villain with dual electron rods and the ability to produce electricity.

== Construction sets ==
According to BrickLink, The Lego Group released a total of 15 Lego sets as part of Lego Ultra Agents theme. It was discontinued by the end of 2015.

=== First wave ===
The first wave of Lego Ultra Agents sets was released on 27 May 2014. Most of the sets were similar to the Lego Agents theme, but the Lego Ultra Agents theme depicted fictional Ultra Agents fighting evil villains accompanied by high-tech equipment in the area of Astor City, which was accompanied by an accessible app. The six sets being released were Riverside Raid (set number: 70160), Tremor Track Infiltration (set number: 70161), Infearno Interception (set number: 70162), Toxikita's Toxic Meltdown (set number: 70163), Hurricane Heist (set number: 70164) and Ultra Agents Mission HQ (set number: 70165). Each of the sets included eight Ultra Agents, named Agent Max Burns, Agent Jack Fury, Agent Solomon Blaze, Agent Curtis Bolt, Agent Caila Phoenix, Professor Christina Hydron, Astor City Guard and Astor City Scientist. Several villains were released, named Adam Acid, Tremor, Infearno, Toxikita, Retox, Psyclone, and Terabyte. It also included variety of weapons and accessories.

=== Second wave ===
The second wave of the Lego Ultra Agents theme was released on 1 March 2015 and had five sets (total of 11 sets) with similar models to the first wave. The second wave also incorporated a sequel to the first compatible app that focused on a villain named Antimatter. The eight sets being released were Spyclops Infiltration (set number: 70166), Invizable Gold Getaway (set number: 70167), Drillex Diamond Job (set number: 70168), Agent Stealth Patrol (set number: 70169) and UltraCopter vs. AntiMatter (set number: 70170). Four additional Ultra Agents, named Agent Trey Swift, Agent Steve Zeal, Professor Brainstein, and P.U.P were released as well. Several additional villains were included, named Spyclops, Invizable, Drillex, and AntiMatter. It also included AppBricks, variety of weapons and accessories. Allows builders to build the AppBricks by place on the touch-screen of tablet device to unlock game features and find secret clues.

=== Third wave ===
The third and last wave of the Lego Ultra Agents theme was released on 19 May 2015 and had three sets (total of 14 sets) with similar models to the first wave. The three sets being released were Ultrasonic Showdown (set number: 70171), AntiMatter's Portal Hideout (set number: 70172) and Ultra Agents Ocean HQ (set number: 70173). Additional villains, named SharX and Electrolyzer, was released as well. It also included AppBricks, a variety of weapons, and accessories. The sets were designed primarily for children aged 7 to 14 years old.

== Web shorts (2014) ==
The Lego Group released a series of web shorts on YouTube for the Ultra Agents theme.

#	Title	Release date
1	Mission Brief	June 16, 2014
2	Training Mission Intro	October 1, 2014
3	Training Mission Scene A	October 1, 2014
4	Training Mission Scene B	October 1, 2014
5	Training Mission Scene C	October 1, 2014
6	Training Mission Scene D	October 1, 2014
7	Training Mission Scene E	October 1, 2014
8	Training Mission Scene F	October 1, 2014
9	Training Mission Scene G	October 1, 2014
10	Training Mission Game Over: Alarm!	October 1, 2014
11	Training Mission Game Over: Neutralizer!	October 1, 2014
12	Training Mission Game Over: Poison!	October 1, 2014
13	Intel A	January 31, 2015
14	Intel B	January 31, 2015
15	Intel C	January 31, 2015
16	Intel D	January 31, 2015

== App ==
The release of the first wave also included free application software compatible with the six released sets. The application, available for iOS and Android devices, included an advanceable plot and comic-centered gameplay. In the second wave, the agents fight in a sequel to the original game against a villain named 'AntiMatter'.

== Reception ==
In 2018, UltraCopter vs. AntiMatter (set number: 70170) was listed as one of the "Top 10 Best LEGO Helicopters Sets" by Lego fansite BricksFanz.

== See also ==
- Lego Alpha Team
- Lego Agents
- Lego Life of George
- Lego Fusion
- Nexo Knights
- Lego BrickHeadz
- Lego Hidden Side
- Lego Super Mario
- Lego Vidiyo
- Ninjago (TV series)
- The Lego Ninjago Movie Video Game
