= Lego Worlds =

2017 Lego-themed sandbox game

- Developer: Traveller's Tales
- Publisher: Warner Bros. Interactive Entertainment
- Directors: John Hodskinson; Arthur Parsons; James McLoughlin
- Designers: Toby Everett; Georgina Cronshaw; Jack Chapman; James Anwyll
- Artist: Leon Warren
- Composers: Rob Westwood; Tess Tyler
- Platforms: Microsoft Windows; PlayStation 4; Xbox One; Nintendo Switch
- Release: Microsoft Windows, PlayStation 4, Xbox One: WW: 7 March 2017; Nintendo Switch: NA: 5 September 2017; EU: 8 September 2017
- Genre: Sandbox
- Modes: Single-player, multiplayer

Lego Worlds is a Lego-themed sandbox game developed by Traveller's Tales and published by Warner Bros. Interactive Entertainment. The game allows players to build constructions in a 3D procedurally generated world. A beta version of the game was released on 1 June 2015 on Steam Early Access. It was released on 7 March 2017 for Microsoft Windows, PlayStation 4, and Xbox One. A version for Nintendo Switch was released on 5 September 2017 in North America and 8 September 2017 in Europe.

== Gameplay ==
Lego Worlds is a sandbox video game that allows players to build a world made up of Lego bricks. The player is rewarded for collecting objects spread across the map with studs, an in-game currency. The player can build using the items they have encountered. Players can create their own world by using predefined Lego structures or using the "brick-by-brick editor tool." Players' appearances and outfits are customizable in the game. Terrain and environment can be modified via landscaping tools. A variety of vehicles, such as helicopters, and creatures are featured in the game. A multiplayer option and features for world-sharing have been added to the game through later updates.

== Development ==
Lego Worlds was created as part of an initiative within The Lego Group to produce a sandbox game following the shutdown of Lego Universe and after a collaboration with Minecraft fell through, both in 2012. The game, codenamed "sandbox," was prototyped in secret and was shown to executives alongside other pitches from Microsoft and TT Games. The game was designed with YouTube playthroughs in mind, with the pitch presentation featuring a mock-up video in the style of a traditional let's play.

Prior to the game's official release, it was teased in the construction manual for the set 60097 City Square. It was formally announced on 1 June 2015 with a simultaneous early access release on Steam to allow the gaming community to provide feedback for continual improvements and the integration of additional content over time. In November 2016, it was announced that the game would leave early access, with the full version set to release in February 2017. In February 2017, it was delayed two weeks to early March. The game left early access and was released for PlayStation 4 and Xbox One on 7 March 2017. The Nintendo Switch version was released in September 2017, after first being announced in January.

The Nintendo Switch was not originally planned as a release platform. TT Games decided to develop a port in January 2017 after receiving positive playtesting feedback on the remaster of Lego City Undercover for the system. The port was developed in five months, as most of the work had already been completed on the other versions. In March 2023 it was reported by Nintendo Life that a mobile version codenamed Project Lego X had been in development by Playdemic and later moved to TT Games after they were bought by Electronic Arts (EA). The port was quietly canceled sometime after and was never released.

== Downloadable content ==
Three add-ons were released for the game. One, titled the Classic Space Pack, added a new biome, several characters, various creatures, vehicles and 2 brick builds: the Space Scooter Base and the Mineral Detector Base. The second pack, titled the Monsters Pack, added a new biome, a few characters, and three brick builds. The third pack, titled the Agents Pack added characters and missions based on the Lego Agents and Ultra Agents themes and was exclusive to the PlayStation 4 version. Two free packs titled Showcase Collection Pack 1 and 2 were released, containing a selection of builds based on various themes that had previously been included as part of the in-game “Build Showcase.”

In June 2017, a trailer for an expansion titled Survivor was released, with an estimated release date of Fall 2017. The expansion was never released for unknown reasons. Similarly, another canceled DLC titled the Wildlife Park Pack was discovered in 2019 when unused assets and artwork were found in the files of The Lego Movie 2 Videogame.

== Reception ==
Reception

Aggregate score
Aggregator	Score
Metacritic	(NS) 59/100 (PC) 71/100 (PS4) 66/100 (XONE) 69/100

Review score
Publication	Score
IGN	7.2/10

According to Metacritic, reception was generally mixed. Metacritic gave the Nintendo Switch, PC, PlayStation 4, and Xbox One versions a score of 59/100, 71/100, 66/100, and 69/100 respectively. The game was nominated for "Family Game" at the 14th British Academy Games Awards.

== See also ==
- Lego Fortnite, another Lego sandbox video game
- Lego Universe, a discontinued Lego MMORPG
