= Lego Dino =

Lego theme

- Subject: Dinosaurs
- Availability: November 2011–December 2012
- Total sets: 7
- Characters: Josh Thunder, Sue Montana, Tracer Tops, Chuck "Stego" Jenkins, Rex Tyrone, Driver, Pilot and Hero
- Official website

Lego Dino is a discontinued Lego theme that was first introduced in 2011 after the discontinued Lego Dino Attack/Dino 2010 theme. The theme was inspired by Jurassic Park film as well as various dinosaur films. It was eventually discontinued by the end of 2012.

== Overview ==
The product line focuses on the humans encountered resurrected dinosaurs in their natural habitat, similar to the Jurassic Park films.

== Characters ==
- Josh Thunder: The descendant of Johnny Thunder and the leader of the Dino Strike team.
- Sue Montana: The dino fighter/catcher.
- Tracer Tops: Truck driver.
- Chuck "Stego" Jenkins: The member of the Dino Strike team.
- Rex Tyrone: The member of the Dino Strike team and explorer.

== Construction sets ==
According to BrickLink, The Lego Group released a total of 7 Lego sets as part of Lego Dino theme. It was discontinued by the end of 2012.

In 2011, The Lego Group announced the seven sets was released in November 2011. The seven sets being released were Ambush Attack (set number: 5882), Tower Takedown (set number: 5883), Raptor Chase (set number: 5884), Triceratops Trapper (set number: 5885), T-Rex Hunter (set number: 5886), Defense HQ (set number: 5887) and Ocean Interceptor (set number: 5888).

=== Ambush Attack ===
Ambush Attack (set number: 5882) was released in November 2011. The set consists of 80 pieces with 1 minifigure. The set included Lego minifigures of the Driver and Coelophysis dinosaur.

=== Tower Takedown ===
Tower Takedown (set number: 5883) was released in November 2011. The set consists of 136 pieces with 1 minifigure. The set included Lego minifigures of the Pilot and Pteranodon dinosaur.

=== Raptor Chase ===
Raptor Chase (set number: 5884) was released in November 2011. The set consists of 259 pieces with 2 minifigures. The set included Lego minifigures of the Driver and Rex Tyrone. Also included Raptor dinosaur.

=== Triceratops Trapper ===
Triceratops Trapper (set number: 5885) was released in November 2011. The set consists of 271 pieces with 2 minifigures. The set included Lego minifigures of the Driver and Tracer Tops. Also included Triceratops dinosaur.

=== T-Rex Hunter ===
T-Rex Hunter (set number: 5886) was released in November 2011. The set consists of 480 pieces with 2 minifigures. The set included Lego minifigures of the Pilot and Chuck “Stego” Jenkins. Also included T-rex dinosaur.

=== Defense HQ ===
Defense HQ (set number: 5887) was released in November 2011. The set consists of 793 pieces with 4 minifigures. The set included Lego minifigures of the Driver, Pilot, Josh Thunder and Sue Montana. Also included T-Rex, Raptor and Coelophysis dinosaurs.

=== Ocean Interceptor ===
Ocean Interceptor (set number: 5888) also known as Pteranodon Chase was released in January 2012. The set consists of 222 pieces with 2 minifigures. The set included Lego minifigures of the Pilot and Hero. Also included Pteranodon dinosaur.

== Reception ==
In 2018, T-Rex Hunter (set number: 5886) was listed as one of the "Top 10 Best LEGO Helicopters Sets" by Lego fansite BricksFanz.

== See also ==
- Lego Dino Attack
- Lego Adventurers
- Lego Studios
- Lego Jurassic World
