= Lego Agents =

Lego theme

- Subject: Agents
- Availability: June 2008–December 2009
- Total sets: 13
- Characters: Agent Charge, Agent Chase, Agent Fuse, Agent Trace, Agent Swipe, Agent Swift, Dr. Inferno, Break Jaw, Claw-Dette, Dollar Bill, Fire-Arm, Gold Tooth, Saw Fist, Slime Face, Spy Clops, Dyna-Mite, Dr. D. Zaster, Magma Commander, Magma Drones and Inferno Henchmen
- Official website

Lego Agents is a discontinued Lego theme that was first introduced in June 2008 after the discontinued Lego Alpha Team theme. The theme was inspired by James Bond as well as various spy movies. The 13 toy sets in the theme's release were split into three waves. In 2009, the theme was re-branded as Lego Agents 2.0. It was discontinued by the end of 2009 and replaced with the Lego Ultra Agents theme in 2014.

== Overview ==
The Lego Agents product line continued the secret agent concept of Lego Alpha Team. The Agents product line was introduced in 2008, with a new range of characters and storylines. It focused on a fictional team of secret agents and their battles against Dr. Inferno and his evil villains. In 2009, two additional agents were introduced and the theme was renamed Agents 2.0.

== Development ==
Lego Agents was inspired by a wide variety of media, with many of the characters having been inspired by fictional spy characters. Lego Designer, Matthew Ashton explained, "We looked into anything spy, agent, super hero or super villain related! TV shows, cartoons and movies from when we were kids, right up to present day. We looked at everything from Mission: Impossible to Thunderbirds. The Agents theme also introduced cyborgs as the villains to give the theme a fantasy element. Matthew Ashton elaborated on the development of the storyline, stating, "Also, I have been asked a lot recently if there is an overall story arc for the Agents theme… i.e a master plan for Dr. Inferno to take over the world etc. To which the answer is ….no." and continued, "When we tested Agents we found, with this theme in particular, it actually worked best not to do so. We designed the products as a series of mini missions, like "steal the Diamond back", "retrieve the Treasure Map", "rescue an Agent", to act as little story starters for the kids, who can then tie them together to create their own master plans."

== Characters ==
=== Agents ===
- Agent Charge: He is a vehicle pilot.
- Agent Chase: He is the leader of the team.
- Agent Fuse: He is the team's computer, electronics, explosives specialist and also a talented pilot.
- Agent Trace: She is the female Agent. She is specialized in security, code declaration and secret missions.
- Agent Swipe: He is an agent equipped with a "bullet-proof vest".
- Agent Swift: She is the additional Agent.

=== Villains ===
- Dr. Inferno: He is the main antagonist of the Lego Agents series and also a mad scientist.
- Break Jaw: He is a Dr. Inferno's henchman. His helmet had a metal jaw.
- Claw-Dette: She is a Dr. Inferno's henchwoman armed with a robotic right arm.
- Dollar Bill: He is Dr. Inferno's henchman and armed with the golden gun.
- Fire-Arm: He is a Dr. Inferno's henchman and armed with the mechanical cannon arm.
- Gold Tooth: He is a Dr. Inferno's henchman.
- Saw Fist: He is a cyborg armed with a robotic chainsaw arm.
- Slime Face: He is a mad scientist.
- Spy Clops: He is a Dr. Inferno's henchman with a 4-legged mech suit.
- Dyna-Mite: She is a demolitions expert.
- Dr. D. Zaster: He is an associate of Dr. Inferno.
- Magma Commander: He is a Dr. Inferno's cybernetic henchman.
- Magma Drones: A robots created by Magma Commander.
- Inferno Henchmen: Dr. Inferno's army.

== Construction sets ==
According to BrickLink, The Lego Group released a total of 13 Lego sets as part of Lego Agents theme. It was discontinued by the end of 2009.

=== First wave ===
In 2008, the six sets was released on 1 June 2008 under the Lego Agents theme. The six sets being released were Gold Hunt (set number: 8630), Jetpack Pursuit (set number: 8631), Swamp Raid (set number: 8632), Speedboat Rescue (set number: 8633), Turbocar Chase (set number: 8634) and Mobile Command Center (set number: 8635). Each of the sets included four agents, named Agent Chase, Agent Charge, Agent Fuse and Agent Trace were released as well. Also included the villains, named Saw Fist, Break Jaw, Inferno Henchman, Gold Tooth, Spy Clops and Dr. Inferno were released as well. It also included variety of weapons and accessories.

=== Second wave ===
The second wave of Lego Agents theme was released on 19 October 2008 and had two sets (total of 8 sets). The two sets being released were Deep Sea Quest (set number: 8636) and Volcano Base (set number: 8637). Also included the additional villains, named Slime Face, Fire Arm and Claw-Dette were released as well. It also included variety of weapons and accessories.

=== Third wave ===
The third and last wave of Lego Agents theme was released on 30 May 2009 and had five sets (total of 13 sets) was re-branded as Lego Agents 2.0 theme. The five sets being released were Gold Tooth's Getaway (set number: 8967), River Heist (set number: 8968), 4-Wheeling Pursuit (set number: 8969), Robo Attack (set number: 8970) and Aerial Defense Unit (set number: 8971). The two additional agents, named Agent Swipe and Agent Swift were released as well. Also included the additional villains, named Dollar Bill, Dyna-Mite, Dr. D. Zaster, Magma Commander and Magma Drones were released as well. It also included variety of weapons and accessories. The sets were designed primarily for children aged 7 to 14 years old.

== Video game ==
=== Lego Worlds (2017) ===
The crossover Lego-themed sandbox game Lego Worlds developed by Traveller's Tales and published by Warner Bros. Interactive Entertainment. Lego Worlds was released on 7 March 2017 for Microsoft Windows, PlayStation 4 and Xbox One. A version for Nintendo Switch was released on 5 September 2017 in North America and 8 September 2017 in Europe. It includes Agent Chase, Agent Trace, Dr. Inferno and Dyna-Mite as playable characters.

== See also ==
- Lego Alpha Team
- Lego Ultra Agents
- Lego Worlds
