= Lego Sports =

Lego theme

- Sub‑themes: Soccer / Football; Gravity Games; Basketball; Hockey
- Subject: Sport
- Availability: 2000–2007
- Total sets: 119

Lego Sports is a discontinued Lego theme that was launched in 2000 and discontinued in 2007. The theme focused on a variety of sports-themed toy sets, including football, basketball and hockey.

== Overview ==
In the late 1990s and early 2000s, The Lego Group made the decision to diversify its product range with sports-themed toy sets. The company initially focused on football, due to the popularity of table football sets and the football game Subbuteo during this period. Lego Sports was launched in 2000 and discontinued in 2007. As a result of several licensing contracts with major sports organisations, the product range displayed the official logos of these organisations.

== Soccer / Football (2000–2007) ==
The football product range differed from other Lego toy sets by focusing on football action instead of construction, so they contained fewer pieces. The branding of the sets was also different to other Lego product ranges. In 2000, the toy sets were illustrated with an image of French footballer Zinedine Zidane, who was represented in Lego minifigure form in set 3401. Some toy sets, such as Championship Challenge incorporated a kicking device that enabled minifigures to kick a ball. In 2001, the theme released the Women's Team set, which included six female minifigure players. This was the largest number of female minifigures included in a set at that time. A range of promotional sets was also released to coincide with the 2002 World Cup. From 2003 to 2005, the Lego Sports theme focused on NBA basketball and NHL hockey, but Lego football toys reappeared in 2006 with the release of three sets that launched around the time of the 2006 World Cup in Germany.

The toy sets for the Soccer sub-theme included:

- 3401 Shoot N' Score
- 3402 Small Grandstand with Lights
- 3403 Fans Grandstand with Scoreboard
- 3404 Black Bus
- 3405 Blue Bus
- 3406 Americas Bus
- 3407 Red Bus
- 3408 Super Sport Coverage
- 3409 Championship Challenge
- 3410 Field Expandera
- 3411 Blue Team Bus With Ball
- 3412 Point Shooting
- 3413 Goal Keeper
- 3414 Precision Shooting
- 3416 Women's Soccer Team
- 3420 Championship Challenge II
- 3421 3 v 3 Shootout
- 3422 Shoot 'N Save
- 3423 Freekick Frenzy
- 3424 Target Practice
- 3425 Grand Championship Cup
- 3426 Team Transport
- 3427 to 3567 Coca-Cola Minifigs and Items
- 3568 Football Shoot Out
- 3569 Football Tabletop
- 3570 Football Mini Field
- 3573 Superstar Figure

== Gravity Games (2003–2004) ==
The Gravity Games sub-theme introduced the extreme sports of snowboarding and skateboarding to Lego sets. The theme was released in 2003 and discontinued in 2004. The theme focused on the Gravity Games, a multi-sport competition that included summer and winter activities. The set boxes were sometimes illustrated with photographs of sports professionals next to their signatures.

The toy sets for the Gravity Games sub-theme included:

- 3535 Skateboard Street Park
  - Minifigures: 1
- 3536 Snowboard Big Air Comp
  - Minifigures: 1
- 3537 Skateboard Vert Park Challenge
  - Minifigures: 2
- 3538 Snowboard Boarder Cross Race
  - Minifigures: 2
- 3585 Snowboard Super Pipe
  - Minifigures: 2

== Basketball (2003–2004) ==
The Basketball sub-theme was launched in 2003. In the first year it was licensed by the National Basketball Association. The minifigures featured spring-loaded legs and hand designs that enabled players to use the minifigure to perform actions, such as shooting and passing. Like the earlier football sub-theme, the set boxes featured images of real NBA players and the toys were decorated with logos of Spalding and NBA. The largest set was Ultimate NBA Arena. Various players were recreated in minifigure form, including Shaquille O'Neal, Jason Kidd, Kobe Bryant and Steve Nash. The minifigures were designed to look like the real players and was the first time that non-yellow minifigures appeared in Lego sets. These realistic skin tones appeared in later themes, such as Lego Harry Potter and Lego Indiana Jones.

The toy sets for the Basketball sub-theme included:

- 3427 NBA Slam Dunk
  - Minifigures: 1
- 3428 One vs One Action
  - Minifigures: 2
- 3429 Ultimate Defense
  - Minifigures: 2
- 3430 NBA Spin and Shoot
  - Minifigures: 2
- 3431 Street Ball 2 vs 2
  - Minifigures: 4
- 3432 NBA Challenge
  - Minifigures: 10
- 3433 Ultimate NBA Arena
  - Minifigures: 10
- 3440 NBA Jam Session
  - Minifigures: 2
- 3548 Slam Dunk Trainer
  - Minifigures: 1
- 3549 Practice Shooting
  - Minifigures: 1
- 3550 Jump and Shoot
  - Minifigures: 1
- 3560 NBA Collectors #1
  - Minifigures: Ray Allen, Tim Duncan, Pau Gasol
- 3561 NBA Collectors #2
  - Minifigures: Antoine Walker, Shaquille O'Neal, Tony Parker
- 3562 NBA Collectors #3
  - Minifigures: Gary Payton, Dirk Nowitzki, Vince Carter
- 3563 NBA Collectors #4
  - Minifigures: Kobe Bryant, Jason Kidd, Toni Kukoč
- 3564 NBA Collectors #5
  - Minifigures: Allen Iverson, Steve Francis, Karl Malone
- 3565 NBA Collectors #6
  - Minifigures: Steve Nash, Jerry Stackhouse, Paul Pierce
- 3566 NBA Collectors #7
  - Minifigures: Jalen Rose, Peja Stojakovic, Kevin Garnett
- 3567 NBA Collectors #8
  - Minifigures: Tracy McGrady, Allan Houston, Chris Webber
- 3584 Rapid Return
  - Minifigures: 1
- 5013 Free Throw
  - Minifigures: 1
- 10121 NBA Basketball Teams
  - Minifigures: 5

== Hockey (2003–2004) ==
The Hockey sub-theme was released from 2003 to 2004. It differed from other Lego Sports product ranges because the first hockey sets included special figures constructed from Technic and Bionicle pieces rather than minifigures. The theme was endorsed by the National Hockey League and NHL Players' Association. In 2004, the sets named NHL Championship Challenge and NHL Street Hockey included minifigures that were placed on discs with poles that allowed the puck to move around.

The toy sets for the Hockey sub-theme included:

- 3540 Puck Passer
- 3541 Slap Shot
- 3542 Flip Shot
- 3543 Slammer Goalie
- 3544 Game Set
- 3545 Puck Feeder
- 3557 Blue Player and Goal
- 3558 Red Player and Goal
- 3559 Red and Blue Player
- 3578 NHL Championship Challenge
- 3579 NHL Street Hockey
- 7919 White Hockey Player
- 7920 Blue Hockey Player
- 10127 NHL Action Set with Stickers
- 65182 Slammer Stadium
