= Lego Avatar: The Last Airbender =

Lego theme

- Subject: Avatar: The Last Airbender
- Licensed from: Nickelodeon
- Availability: June 2006–November 2007
- Total sets: 2
- Characters: Aang, Sokka, Momo, Katara, Zuko, Firebender and Fire Nation soldier

Lego Avatar: The Last Airbender is a discontinued Lego theme based on the Nickelodeon television show Avatar: The Last Airbender created by Michael Dante DiMartino and Bryan Konietzko. It is licensed from Nickelodeon. The theme was introduced in June 2006, and was discontinued by the end of the following year.

== Overview ==
Lego Avatar: The Last Airbender was based on the first season of Avatar. The product line focuses on the journey of one hundred and twelve-year-old Aang, the current Avatar and last survivor of his nation, the Air Nomads, along with his friends Katara and Sokka, as they strive to end the Fire Nation's war against the other nations of the world. Lego Avatar aimed to recreate the main characters in Lego form, including Aang, Katara, Sokka, Momo, Zuko, Firebenders and Fire Nation soldiers.

In addition to the two Avatar sets, three SpongeBob SquarePants-themed sets were released at the same time in 2006, with both themes being the flagship product for a new partnership between Lego and Nickelodeon. The Nickelodeon series featured its most iconic shows, which were Avatar, SpongeBob SquarePants and its newest member, Teenage Mutant Ninja Turtles.

== Characters ==
- Aang: The last surviving Airbender, a monk of the Air Nomads' Southern Air Temple.
- Sokka: A fifteen-year-old warrior of the Southern Water Tribe, a nation where some people are able to telekinetically manipulate, or "bend", water.
- Katara: A fourteen-year-old waterbender (i.e., she has the ability to telekinetically control water and ice); at the beginning of the story, she is the only waterbender in the Southern Water Tribe, one of three known communities in which waterbending is practiced.
- Momo: A winged Lemur who Aang finds at the Southern Air Temple and then keeps as a pet.
- Zuko: The Crown Prince of the Fire Nation and a skilled firebender, meaning he has the ability to create and control fire.

== Construction sets ==
According to BrickLink, the Lego Group released a total of 2 Lego sets as part of the Lego Avatar: The Last Airbender theme:

=== Air Temple ===
Air Temple (set number: 3828) was released on 1 June 2006 based on the seventeenth episode of season 1 titled The Northern Air Temple. The set consisted of 400 pieces with 5 minifigures, and included Aang's glider and a section of the Northern Air Temple. The Northern Air Temple included a main door with sliding and locking features. Also included was a catapult and Fire Nation vehicle that is able to seat one minifigure. The set included Lego minifigures of Aang, Sokka, Momo, a Firebender and a Fire Nation soldier.

=== Fire Nation Ship ===
Fire Nation Ship (set number: 3829) was released on 1 June 2006 and based on Prince Zuko's ship. The set consisted of 722 pieces with 5 minifigures, and featured a large Fire Nation ship with a built in catapult, retractable anchor, and an extending ladder along the side. Also included was a small dinghy that could launch out of the main ship and seat one minifigure. The set included Lego minifigures of the Aang, Katara, Zuko, a Firebender and a Fire Nation soldier.

== Other media ==
=== Lego Ideas ===
In 2020, a revival set named Avatar: The Last Airbender – The Avatar Returns, which was created by StudioTRico, reached 10,000 votes on LEGO Ideas in order for Lego to consider to make it into an official set. The project includes characters such as Aang, Katara, Sokka, Prince Zuko, Iroh and a Fire Nation soldier.

== See also ==
- Lego SpongeBob SquarePants
- Lego Teenage Mutant Ninja Turtles
