= Lego Hidden Side =

Lego theme

- Subject: Ghosts, supernatural, and mystery solving with interactive augmented reality
- Availability: August 2019–December 2020
- Total sets: 32
- Characters: Jack Davids, Parker L. Jackson, Dr. J.B. Watt, El Fluego, Spencer and TeeVee
- Official website

Lego Hidden Side is a discontinued Lego theme that was first introduced in August 2019. It took place in the fictional city of "Newbury" and linked Lego playsets to an app of the same name (for iOS and Android), which was used to hunt, capture and collect ghosts via augmented reality. The series came on the market in 2019 and, after the discontinued Lego Dimensions and Nexo Knights series, represented another attempt by The Lego Group to link digital and real game worlds. It was accompanied by the Lego Hidden Side webisode series and a television special, which was released on the Lego YouTube channel, and on Cartoon Network. The product line was discontinued by the end of 2020.

== Overview ==
Lego Hidden Side was a Lego product line that was designed to provide an experience that combines both physical and digital play. This has been described by The Lego Group as "fluid play". The Hidden Side theme involved traditional brick built playsets, but combined them with augmented reality. This involved the use of a smartphone app that brought the sets to life and revealed a hidden digital world that offers various challenges. The digital world represented the "hidden side", a hidden world that is populated by virtual ghosts. The app provided the interactive aspect of the experience when a smartphone was held up to the physical sets.

The augmented reality play experience focused on the main characters Jack and Parker who begin ghost-catching in Newbury. Players explored the various haunted locations of Newbury through these characters, with clues about the city's history of paranormal activity revealed within the sets.

== Development ==
Lego Hidden Side began with a brief given to the company's Creative Play Lab to develop a concept for a "Play-Theme 2.0", a theme that would include augmented reality to enhance physical Lego play. The team at the Creative Play Lab came up with many concepts and tested them with children to assess their reactions. Senior Design Manager Sven Robin Kahl commented, "It was clear they needed to create a ghost theme, as that concept worked so well with the digital layer. Digital ghosts that can only be seen with the phone!"

The theme was also the result of an extensive investigation by The Lego Group into augmented reality gameplay with the use of advanced hardware. To implement the functionality, the theme required ARKit for iOS users and ARCore for Android on mobile devices. This was a capability that could be accessed by most children in the primary market. The theme was developed as a team process between the model designers and the app developers. Senior Product Lead, Murray Andrews commented that the integration of the app functionality offered certain challenges stating, "a simple example is you are holding the phone in one hand and you have to interact with the model, you have only got the other hand to do it. So they had to simplify some of the functions to be able to use one hand rather than two handed functions. That was just an interesting journey that we went on with this project, with the designers having to learn new ways of making things work."

The sets were designed to appear like existing Lego urban buildings but, when used in conjunction with the app, were interactive. The augmented reality placed a graphic overlay on the image of the sets that transformed buildings, vehicles or Lego minifigures into paranormal creations. Roberto Marchesi, lead digital creative explained, "We didn't want to have a really cool game that was working in isolation from the sets. We wanted to create a holistic experience with AR." The process of developing an augmented reality game was particularly challenging for the design team and required an investigation into what good augmented reality really meant. Marchesi explained, "When we started this process, we didn't even know what good AR play was because no one had good AR play where you go back and forth between the digital and physical interaction. There was a lot of exploration and learning based on the simple mechanics involved of looking through your phone, taking stock of what you see, and then acting accordingly."

== Launch ==
The Lego Hidden Side theme was launched in August 2019. As part of the marketing campaign, The Lego Group engaged The Mill to create an event that was designed to create awareness of the theme. The event invited five YouTube influencers to take part in an interactive ghost hunting experience, which involved the characters from the storyline. The event was subsequently broadcast on YouTube.

== Characters ==
- Jack Davids: He is a "cool YouTuber" who recently moved to Newbury and used to be the new kid along with his mother, who is the principal of his high school and is unaware of her son's ghost hunting life. He usually wears a hoodie and a baseball cap. Voiced by Corey Krueger.
- Douglas Elton / El Fuego: He is the school caretaker, sports teacher and stuntman. It is revealed that he wanted to be stuntman but got hurt every time he tried to do a stunt, leading him to be a school caretaker at Newbury High until ghosts arrived in town. Jack, Parker and J.B. recruited him as their own stuntman called "El Fuego". He used to be human in Season 1 but got turned into a skeleton when he sacrificed himself in the episode titled Skeleton in the Closet. Voiced by William Kasten.
- Parker L. Jackson: She is Jack's classmate and is described as an outsider in school. Her parents are always busy and they are oblivious about her life as a ghost hunter. She is the great-great-great-great-granddaughter of Vaughn G. Jackson, Newbury's original ghost/monster hunter. Voiced by Amelia Clover.
- Dr. J.B. Watt: She is Newbury's scientific authority, who discovered how to manipulate and capture the ghosts using the app and mostly operates from her research laboratory. She used to have a bus named "Sweet Sally" and she never gets it dirty despite having a messy lab and having high tech ghost hunting gear on it. She sacrificed her bus to trap Lady E. in the Season 2 finale titled The Lighthouse but replaced it with a fire truck called Sweet Sally Jr. Voiced by L.C. Curci.
- Spencer: He is Jack's "ghost dog" who used to be alive until he died.
- TeeVee: J.B.'s robotic assistant.

== Construction sets ==
According to BrickLink, The Lego Group released 32 playsets and promotional packs based on the Hidden Side theme.

=== First wave sets ===
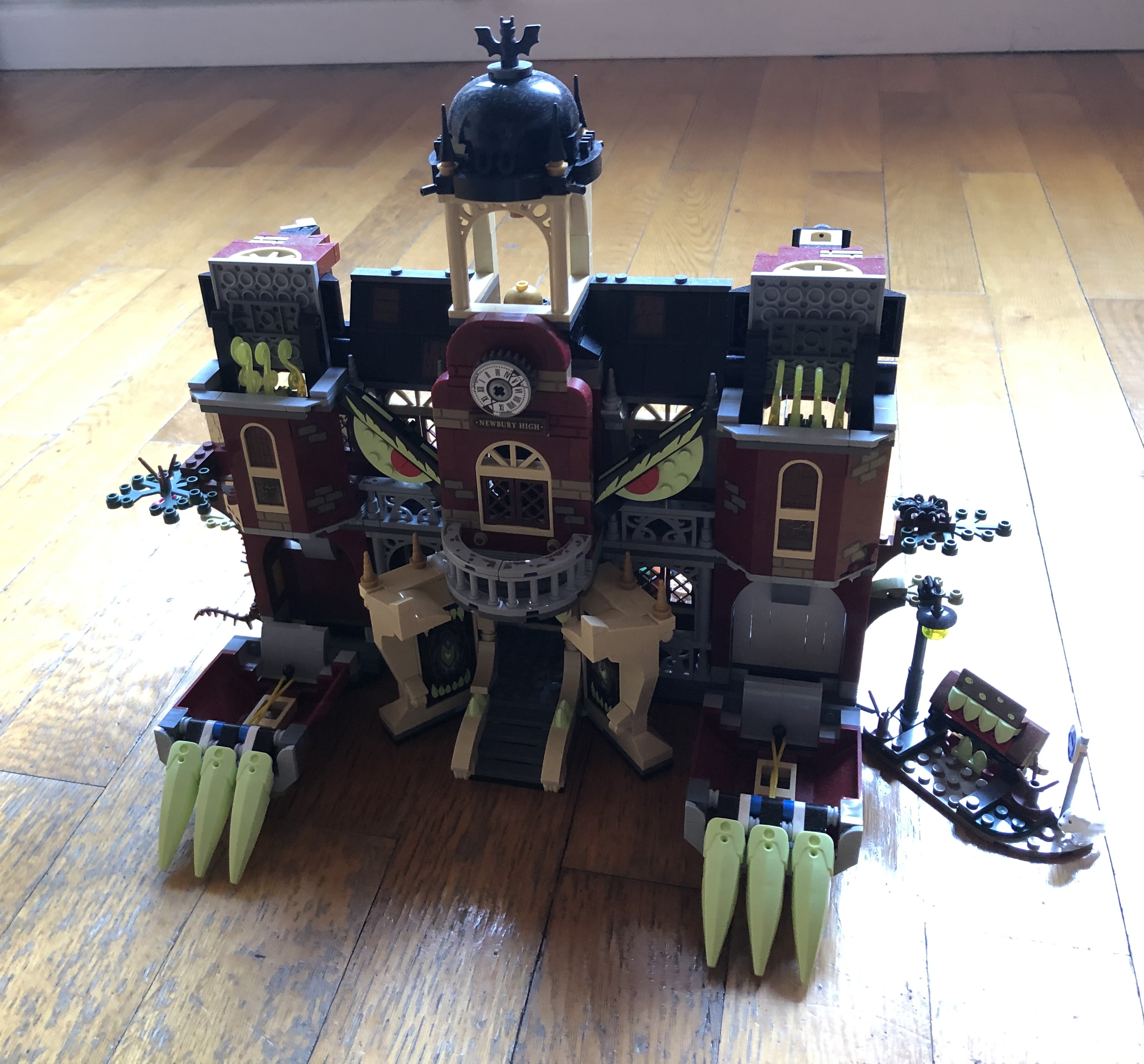
Lego Hidden Side: Newbury Haunted High School

On 14 February 2019, it was officially announced by The Lego Group that the first wave sets of Lego Hidden Side theme was launched at the New York Toy Fair on 1 August 2019. The eight sets being released are J.B.'s Ghost Lab (set number: 70418), Wrecked Shrimp Boat (set number: 70419), Graveyard Mystery (set number: 70420), El Fuego's Stunt Truck (set number: 70421), Shrimp Shack Attack (set number: 70422), Paranormal Intercept Bus 3000 (set number: 70423), Ghost Train Express (set number: 70424) and Newbury Haunted High School (set number: 70425). Later, Newbury Juice Bar (set number: 40336) is an exclusive set only available on September until October 2019 as a promotion. Each of the sets that allow the player to download the App in their smartphone and find the hidden ghosts. The sets were designed primarily for children with an age rating of 7+ or above.

=== Second wave sets ===
On 27 November 2019, it was announced that the second wave sets would be released on 1 January 2020. The six sets released were Welcome to the Hidden Side (set number: 70427), Jack's Beach Buggy (set number: 70428), El Fuego's Stunt Airplane (set number: 70429), Newbury Subway Station (set number: 70430), The Lighthouse of Darkness (set number: 70431), Haunted Fairground (set number: 70432). Also included Drag Racer (set number: 40408) is an exclusive set only available in January 2020 as a promotion.

=== Third wave sets ===
Later, the third wave sets would be released on 1 June 2020. The five sets being released are J.B's Submarine (set number: 70433), Supernatural Race Car (set number: 704234), Abandoned Newburry Prison (set number: 70435), Ghost Fire Truck 3000 (set number: 70436) and Mystery Castle (set number: 70437). In addition, the two polypag sets have been released as a promotions are Chef Enzo's Haunted Hotdogs (set number: 30463) and El Fuego's Stunt Cannon (set number: 30464).

The product line was discontinued and all sets were retired by the end of 2020.

== Web episodes ==
The product line was accompanied by a series of animated short films that was released on YouTube. The series followed the story of Jack, Parker and their friends who aim to clean up the ghosts in Newbury. This series was created by Mikkel Lee and executive produced by Tommy Andreasen, Robert Fewkes, Sanjee Gupta and Joshua Wexler. It was produced by Pure Imagination Studios, written by Lila Scott and directed by Zac Moncrief.

=== Cast ===
- Andy Alberto: Bawa Bat, Biker Joey (ep. 8), Lighthouse Keeper (ep. 19)
- Lindsey Alena: Lady E, Linda (ep. 11)
- Mike Anthony: Clown Boss Ghost (ep. 12)
- Bruce Baker: Nibbs
- Amelia Clover: Parker
- LC Curci: JB, Nanny Mamali
- Eric Emery: Dale Trucker Boss Ghost (ep. 14)
- Paul Edwards: Dr. Drewell
- Michael Johnson: Spewer (ep. 6), Biker Dwayne (ep. 8), Mr. Clarke (ep. 11)
- William Kasten: Douglas, Captain Jonas (ep. 3), Chief Silento (ep. 4), Bob (ep. 11), Weather Boss Ghost
- Corey Krueger: Jack, Archibald, Jonas Jr. (ep. 3)
- Deborah Marlowe: Rose (ep. 11)
- Christopher Molinari: Mason
- Paige Mount: Worker Nana (ep. 6)
- Ben Rausch: Conductor Boss Ghost (ep. 15)
- Wally Wingert: Vaughn

=== Season 1 ===
In the first season, 11 web shorts were released on YouTube.

#	Title	Release date	Notes
1	Face Your Fears	October 16, 2019	LEGO Hidden Side computer-animated series
2	Vlog Hog	October 23, 2019	LEGO Hidden Side computer-animated series
3	Sink or Swim	October 31, 2019	LEGO Hidden Side computer-animated series
4	Don't Choke Now	November 6, 2019	LEGO Hidden Side computer-animated series
5	Bat Crazy	November 15, 2019	LEGO Hidden Side computer-animated series
6	Potty Mouth	November 20, 2019	LEGO Hidden Side computer-animated series
7	Gloom and Doom	November 27, 2019	LEGO Hidden Side computer-animated series
8	Life in the Ghost Lane	December 4, 2019	LEGO Hidden Side computer-animated series
9	Good Chemistry	December 11, 2019	LEGO Hidden Side computer-animated series
10	Skeleton in the Closet	December 18, 2019	LEGO Hidden Side computer-animated series
11	Parents Just Don't Understand	January 30, 2020	LEGO Hidden Side computer-animated series

=== Season 2 ===
In the second season, nine web shorts were released on YouTube.

#	Title	Release date	Notes
1	Carnival of Doom	February 6, 2020	LEGO Hidden Side computer-animated series
2	Flying Lessons	February 13, 2020	LEGO Hidden Side computer-animated series
3	Doom Buggy	February 20, 2020	LEGO Hidden Side computer-animated series
4	Oh, Rats!	February 27, 2020	LEGO Hidden Side computer-animated series
5	Grave Situation	March 5, 2020	LEGO Hidden Side computer-animated series
6	Haunting 101	April 2, 2020	LEGO Hidden Side computer-animated series
7	The Great Escape	April 9, 2020	LEGO Hidden Side computer-animated series
8	The Lighthouse, Part 1	April 16, 2020	LEGO Hidden Side computer-animated series
9	The Lighthouse, Part 2	April 23, 2020	LEGO Hidden Side computer-animated series

== TV special ==
Lego Hidden Side: Night of the Harbinger Halloween Special is a 44 minutes television special in Lego animation, based on Lego theme of Lego Hidden Side, produced by Pure Imagination Studios. The special premiered on Cartoon Network in the US on 31 October 2020. Also included the voice cast are Amelia Clover, L.C. Curci, William Kasten, Corey Krueger and Wally Wingert.

== Video game and app ==
=== Lego Brawls ===
A crossover mobile fighting game named Lego Brawls was developed by RED Games. Lego Brawls was released exclusively for Apple Arcade on September 19, 2019, for iOS devices, and made available for PC and Consoles in June 2022. It includes Jack Davids and Parker L. Jackson as playable characters.

=== App ===
The Lego Hidden Side app was released on 29 July 2019, and was the mobile app for the Lego Hidden Side theme, available for the operating systems iOS and Android. The app had since received several updates that increased the game options. Players were able to choose between playing the game in ghost mode or in ghost hunter mode. In ghost mode, the player was haunted by other players in a first-person shooter, in a location not unlike Newbury. In ghost hunter mode, the player had the task of catching as many ghosts as possible. To do this, the player scanned a set that was supplemented by additional elements on the screen via augmented reality. Depending on the set, different ghosts would've appeared - including a set-dependent boss spirit - which could then be caught. Captured ghosts were then collected and could have been viewed in the app, including their short biographies. The Lego Hidden Side app was discontinued in 2023.

== Awards and nominations ==
The Hidden Side Haunted Fairground (set number: 70432) was the overall winner of the Editor's Choice Awards at Toy Fair 2020 at Olympia, London, which is an annual awards event organised by the British Toy and Hobby Association.

The Hidden Side Paranormal Intercept Bus (set number: 70423) was listed as one of the "10 best Lego sets 2021" by official website Pocket-lint.

== See also ==
- Toys-to-life
- Lego Ultra Agents
- Lego Monster Fighters
- Lego Ghostbusters
- Nexo Knights
- Lego Scooby-Doo
- Lego Stranger Things
- Lego Super Mario
- Lego Vidiyo
