= Lego Boost =

Lego theme

- Subject: Robotics
- Availability: 2017–2022
- Official website

Lego Boost is a discontinued theme produced by The Lego Group intended as a counterpart to Lego Mindstorms for younger builders. The theme is connected to the Lego Boost programming app, which is available for both iOS and Android.

The theme began in 2017 after the announcement of the BOOST Creative Toolbox at the Consumer Electronics Show in Las Vegas. It was awarded Tech Toy of the Year in 2018. The set was retired at the end of 2022.

== Presentation ==
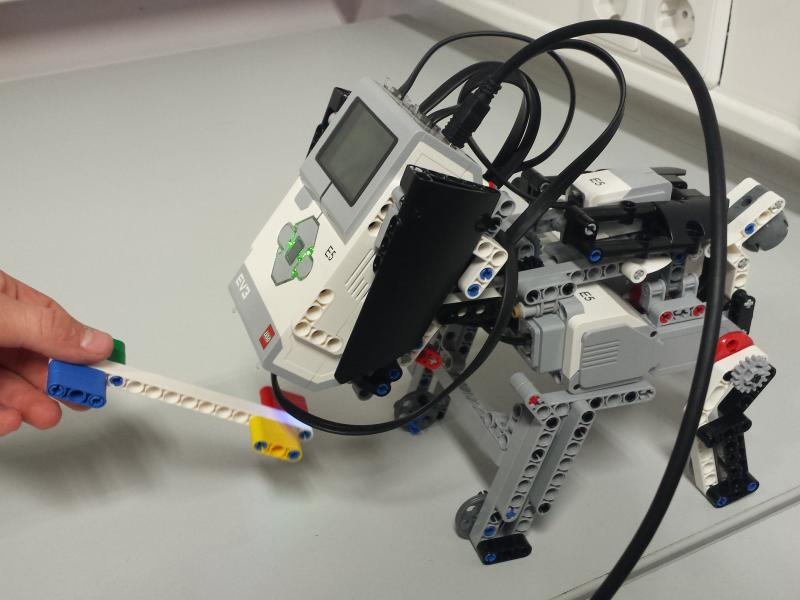
The Mindstorms EV3 robot.

Lego Boost was unveiled to the general public in January 2017 at the Consumer Electronics Show in Las Vegas with a kit containing 543 pieces. The product line forms part of The Lego Group's digital transformation, which began in 2014, including the creation of a digital ecosystem. According to Lego, the system is suitable for children aged seven and older thanks to its simple programming interface and its combination of educational and entertainment goals, allowing children to learn the basics of computer programming and robotics through play. It differs from Lego Mindstorms, which has targeted teenagers and adults since 1998, and from Lego Education WeDo, which is designed for primary schools.

Lego Boost sets use standard Lego bricks. There is no printed instruction manual; construction is carried out exclusively through a tablet application, which also provides the programming interface. Each robot is powered by the Move Hub, a programmable intelligent brick equipped with two sensors: a color and distance sensor that detects object distance, color, and movement, and a tilt sensor that communicates with the tablet. Sounds produced by the robots are played through the connected device's speaker.

== Operation ==
The various programs that the robots can perform are available through the Lego Boost mobile application or the educational programming platform Scratch, both of which require a Bluetooth connection. Programs must be created by the user. To do so, the user assembles a sequence of "programming blocks", each block corresponding to a specific action. Executing the sequence causes the robot to perform actions in a defined order while also responding to specified conditions based on parameters such as an object's color or movement. For example, if a robot encounters a yellow birthday cake, it can recognize the color yellow and play Happy Birthday. The system serves as an introduction to programming concepts such as while loops and algorithms. However, only a limited number of loops can be used simultaneously, requiring users to create multiple programs for more complex behaviors instead of a single one.

The function of each programming block is represented by an icon rather than text, allowing children who cannot yet read to use Boost.

The basic programming concepts are introduced through missions, some of which take the form of tutorials. These missions also help users gradually gain experience with the system. Programs created by users that are not included as part of the predefined robots can be developed in a dedicated interface known as the Coding Canvas. Users can also pair a custom-built robot with the Move Hub using a mode called Creative Canvas, which provides access to programming blocks that are not limited to those designed for the standard robots.

== Sets ==
=== Lego Boost ===
Creative Toolbox

The original Lego Boost set includes five buildable models. The main robot, Vernie, can drive in any direction, launch projectiles, dance, speak using a voice recording system, box, and play hockey. Frankie the Cat can purr and drink from a bottle, while the Guitar 4000 plays music when its neck is moved. A multifunctional rover, an automated production line for miniature Lego models, and various play accessories can also be built. To use Boost, users must download the Lego Boost mobile application, available for Windows 10, Android, iOS, and Fire. The set contains approximately 847 pieces and includes a gridded play mat used in several missions.

The application includes sixty activities that gradually teach users how to control the models while unlocking additional programming blocks, up to a maximum of one hundred. The first missions have the user build a small buggy, which serves as a tutorial with simple programming tasks. Only after these introductory missions are completed are the building instructions for the five main models unlocked. Because construction is lengthy, it is interspersed with short missions in which users test partially completed models by making them perform various movements.

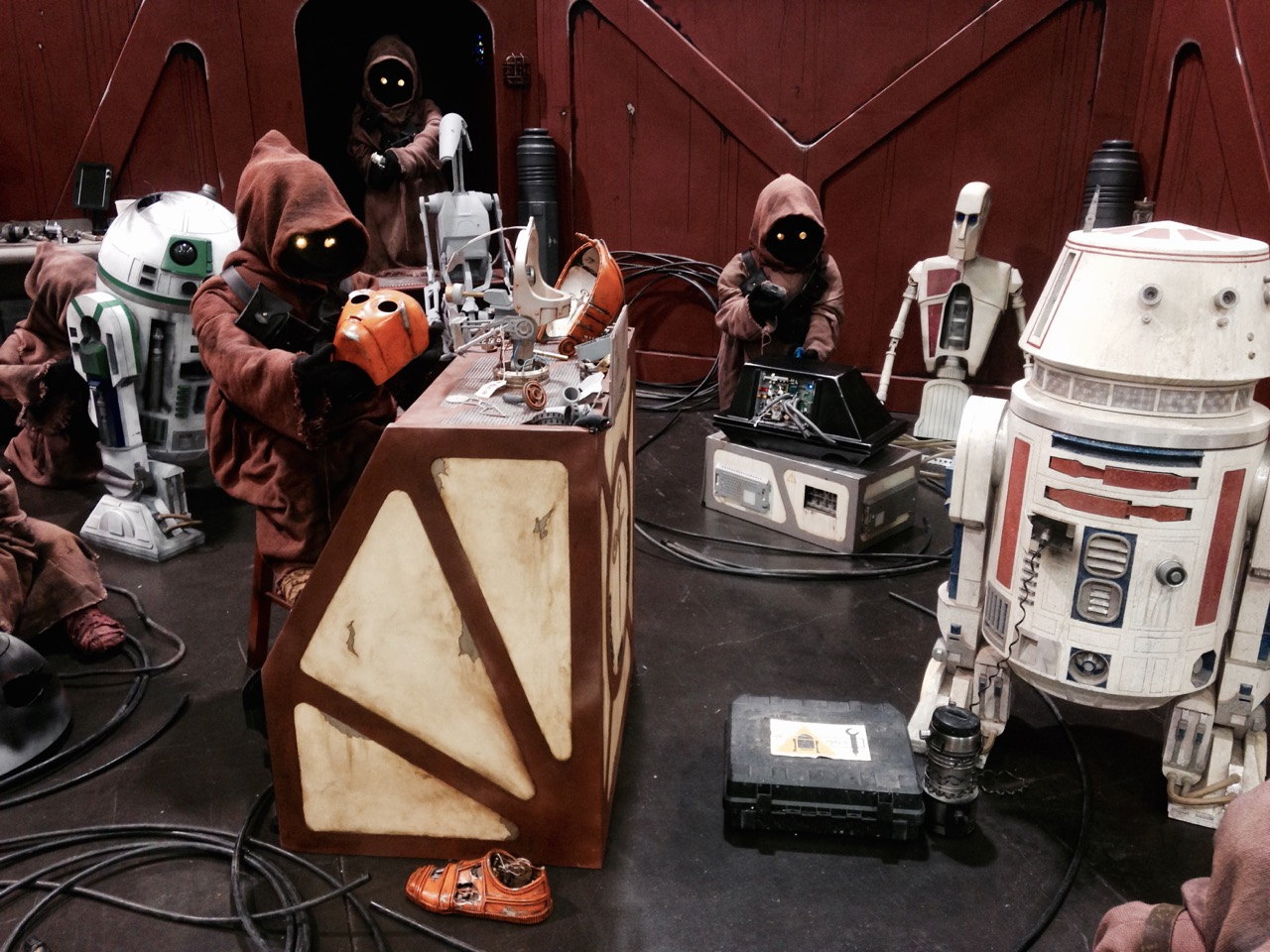
Jawas with their Sandcrawler. At the far left is a robot resembling R2-D2, while the background at right includes a mouse droid.

Droid Commander

Released in 2019 alongside Star Wars: The Rise of Skywalker, the second Boost set includes three droids from the Star Wars franchise: Gonk, the MSE-6 "mouse" droid, and R2-D2. It contains 1,177 pieces and several accessories. The droids range from 16 to 18 cm (6.3 to 7.1 in) in height and, unlike the original 2017 set, can be built independently of one another.

A new mobile application, Lego Boost Star Wars (available for Android, iOS, and Fire), includes 43 missions. These take place in various locations from the Star Wars universe. Players begin on Tatooine under the guidance of Luke Skywalker before travelling to the Death Star, Alderaan, and Bespin, and also participate in the Battle of Yavin. After completing all missions, players gain access to the Jawas' Sandcrawler, where they can create their own programs.

Original name	English name	Set number	Release date	Models	Pieces
Creative Toolbox	Creative Toolbox	17101	1 August 2017	Vernie the Robot, Frankie the Cat, Guitar 4000, AutoBuilder, Multi-Tool Rover 4	847
Droid Commander	Droid Commander	75253	1 July 2019	R2-D2, Gonk droid, MSE-6 mouse droid	1177

=== Integration with other Lego themes ===
Selected sets from other Lego themes can be connected to the Boost application and enhanced with the Move Hub motor to provide functionality similar to dedicated Boost sets. The first compatible set was Stormbringer from Lego Ninjago, released in 2018. It can move its head and tail, produce sound effects, and launch missiles. It was soon followed by the Arctic Scout Truck from the Lego City Arctic subtheme.

Theme	Original name	English name	Set number	Release date	Pieces
Lego Ninjago	Stormbringer	Stormbringer	70652	June 2018	493
Lego City	Arctic Scout Truck	Arctic Scout Truck	60194	July 2018	322

== Reception ==
Reviewing the original Lego Boost set, Nicolas Six of Le Monde and Lucie Ronfaut of Le Figaro criticized the building process as being too "complex", although Six described the instructions as "clear". By contrast, Steven John of Business Insider and Siddharth Chauhan of TechRadar praised the set, with both commending its step-by-step building process, interspersed with programming lessons, which Chauhan said helped keep children engaged throughout the lengthy construction process. Avram Piltch of Tom's Guide wrote that it "encourages and rewards exploration", and in a separate review for the publication, stated that the programming interface was simple and enjoyable enough to be accessible even to children younger than Lego's recommended minimum age of seven.

Six also criticized the fact that some models cannot be built simultaneously because the set does not contain enough pieces, making construction less convenient. Both Six and Ronfaut also considered the interaction with the Boost models to be limited and criticized the lack of compatibility with other programming languages, arguing that this reduced the product's long-term appeal.

Despite these criticisms, both Le Monde and Le Figaro described Boost as "a good learning tool" and "an excellent introduction" to computer programming, recommending it for children while noting that it could be enjoyed by users of all ages, although they considered its price relatively high. This assessment was shared by Sébastien Gavois of Next INpact, as well as Siddharth Chauhan. Lance Ulanoff of Mashable described it as an ideal stepping stone before progressing to Lego Mindstorms, while Hitesh Raj Bhagat of The Economic Times considered it an "excellent" introduction to both programming and STEM. The product's educational value in science, technology, engineering, and mathematics (STEM) was also highlighted by Business Insider, PCMag, and Engadget.

Gregori Pujol of Le Journal du Geek described the second set as largely successful, praising its well-animated droids. However, he criticized the inclusion of only a single Move Hub, which prevents users from operating all three droids simultaneously without purchasing additional hardware. He also described the application's controls as "very simple".

== See also ==
- Lego Mindstorms
- Lego Spybotics
