= Lego Alpha Team =

Building toy line by Lego

- Logo used for the Mission Deep Freeze sub-theme (2004-2005)
- Sub‑themes: Mission Deep Sea and Mission Deep Freeze
- Subject: Secret Agents
- Licensed from: The Lego Group
- Availability: March 2001–December 2005
- Total sets: 34
- Characters: Dash Justice, Crunch, Radia, Charge, Cam Attaway, Flex, Tee-Vee, Arrow, Diamond Tooth, Gearbox, Zed and Ogel
- Official website

Lego Alpha Team (stylized as LEGO Alpha Team) is a discontinued Lego theme that was released in 2001 and ended in 2005. It focused on a group of secret agents and their evil nemesis named Ogel.

== Overview ==
Lego Alpha Team was a Lego product line that was in production from March 2001 to December 2005. It centred on a group of secret agents who aimed to stop an evil character named Ogel from changing people into skeleton drones with mind controlling orbs. The backstory was driven by the Lego Alpha Team PC game and other published media. The name "Ogel" is the word "Lego" in reverse.

== Storyline ==
Alpha Team starts out as a basic top secret group, under the leadership of Dash Justice. In the original video game, Ogel has captured all of the Alpha Team agents with the exception of Dash, And has made evil orbs that can turn ordinary civilians into mindless drones to serve as his slaves. However, he is defeated by the newly reunited Alpha Team who break the power of the evil orbs to restore the drones back to normal. They capture Ogel and destroy the orb machine, but Ogel manages to escape.

The 2001 storyline is the exact same as the video game, However, the Alpha team agents are never captured, And each character has their own vehicle.

In the 2002 storyline, Ogel returns with more sinister looking drones. Ogel has re-engineered the evil orb so that it causes mutations and uses it to mutate sea creatures to serve him. Ogel's left hand is replaced by a transparent red hook that can still hold things. Alpha Team's helper, TeeVee (a television with legs and antennae) can now turn into a deep sea rover for small openings and scout around the sea embankment. In the webtoon, Into the Deep, Ogel's sinister plan for the mutant sea animals is destroyed when Dash reverses the orb factory controls, thus reverting all the sea animals back to normal. However, Ogel escapes again by detaching the cockpit on his Mutant Squid vehicle.

In the 2004 storyline, Alpha Team was revised. The Alpha Team symbol was changed, Crunch and Cam have been replaced by Diamond Tooth and Arrow (respectively), and Ogel has replaced his red hook with a transparent blue hook. Alpha Team has more tech and their vehicles have a new feature: they can initiate Alpha Mode, a feature that transforms one vehicle to another without disassembling and rebuilding. This time, Ogel's plan has gone from mind control to causing damage to the world. His plan is to freeze the world at his base in Antarctica with ice orbs to freeze time itself. The ice orbs are completely different from the evil orbs Ogel made earlier, as they no longer cause mutations/brainwashing, but instead freeze everything on touch. Alpha Team track him down to Antarctica. They race to Ogel's fortress in a desperate gamble to stop him from freezing time, Ogel ends up freezing almost all members of Alpha Team. However, Charge and TeeVee cannot be found in the iceboxes.

In the 2005 storyline, drones start to behave randomly and steal famous landmarks. Then Zed, a special agent of Alpha Team, arrives at Antarctica. He melts the ice around the other agents and sets off on his own mission. While the other agents are stopping Ogel's drones, Ogel appears in the Scorpion Orb Launcher, his own vehicle that can convert into the Viper Escape. Ogel and Zed battle. The Lego Club Magazine invited fans to write their own stories about who would win and what would happen next. The Lego Magazine didn't show the results, but it was assumed that Zed won the conflict and that the world was restored to normal.

== Characters ==
=== Alpha Team ===
- Dash Justice: The main protagonist of Alpha Team. Motion Expert and Team Leader. Very brave but quite cocky. Loves the seaside. Team Color: Black/Blue
- Crunch: Explosives Expert. Team Color: Green
- Radia: Lasers Expert. She controls the cockpit area in the Mobile Command Center. Extremely beautiful. Team Color: Purple/Pink
- Charge: Electricity Expert. His gloves apparently allow him to fly with jets in them, as shown on the cover of the video game. Team Color: Blue/Red
- Cam Attaway: Motors Expert and mechanic. Team Color: Red
- Flex: Ropes expert. Team Color: Orange
- Diamond Tooth: Mining Expert. Team Color: Green
- Arrow: Alpha Team mechanic. Team Color: Yellow
- Gearbox: All that is known about this agent is that he built the Tundra Tracker.
- Zed: Special agent and the pilot of the Blizzard Blaster. Team color: Silver
- Tee-Vee: Team's assistant. TeeVee, as the name suggests, was originally a Television with legs. He then became an underwater robot for Mission Deep Sea. In the final mission for Alpha Team, he was a fully functional android.

=== Ogel ===
- Ogel: The ruthless villain of the series. He has been the main villain in each year of the series, constantly coming up with schemes to defeat Alpha Team. His first plot was to use Mind Control Orbs to turn regular people into mindless skeleton-like Drones. These Drones were reverted to normal when the Orbs were destroyed. Ogel returned the following year with a new plan to use mutated sea creatures to control the world's oceans. That plan was thwarted when Agent Dash reversed the controls to the Orb making machine. Ogel's underwater base was destroyed, but Ogel escaped before it exploded. His most recent plan for domination was freezing the world with new Ice Orbs that could freeze anything. His plan succeeded, but he was then stopped by special agent Zed in his Blizzard Blaster. He used to be in love with Radia. "Ogel" is LEGO spelled backwards. In an issue of the LEGO Club Magazine, it was explained that this was due to him representing the exact opposite of LEGO (LEGO is fun, Ogel hates fun, etc.). Ogel is a direct descendant of Vladek, a villain in the Knights Kingdom series. . Greg Farshtey, the writer of Bionicle, Lego Exo-Force, and Alpha Team, among others, has stated that he is his favorite non-Bionicle villain.
- Skeleton Drones: Ogel's minions, who are people who have been affected by Mind Control Orbs. Their appearance changes numerous times during the series.
- Super Ice Drone: A Skeleton Drone with a black head that pilots the Scorpion Orb Launcher.

== Construction sets ==
According to BrickLink, The Lego Group released a total of 34 Lego sets and promotional polybags as part of the Lego Alpha Team theme. The product line was eventually discontinued by the end of 2005.

=== Original ===
The theme's first main sets and promotional polybags was released from 2001 to 2002. The original toy sets were centred around Alpha Team attacking Ogel's base, which was a control centre on a floating island. The team used a variety of vehicles to attack Ogel's base, including the Alpha Team ATV and the Cruiser. Each vehicle displayed the Alpha Team logo, which was a globe with a red ring around it. Ogel's logo was a skull face, which appeared on his control centre and ship.

Set number	Name	Release date	Pieces	Minifigures included
6771	Ogel Command Striker	1 March 2001	28	Ogel
6772	Alpha Team Cruiser	1 March 2001	56	Radia
6773	Alpha Team Helicopter	1 March 2001	78	Dash
6774	Alpha Team ATV	1 March 2001	132	Flex, Cam
6775	Alpha Team Bomb Squad	1 March 2001	190	Tee Vee, Crunch, Charge
6776	Ogel Control Center	1 March 2001	411	Ogel, two Drone Minion Commanders

=== Mission Deep Sea ===
17 sets and promotional polybags were released from 2002 to 2003. The Mission Deep Sea sets were set beneath the ocean and focused on Ogel's underwater base. The toy sets also included aquatic vessels driven by Ogel, such as Mutant Squid and Mutant Killer Whale. Ogel's colour scheme of black and red was displayed on the base, mutant fish and Shark Sub, while the Alpha Team submersible vehicles were designed in yellow and black.

Set number	Name	Release date	Pieces	Minifigures included
1425	Dash Jet Sub	2002	22	Dash
1426	Cam Wing Diver	2002	21	Cam
1427	Ogel Marine Slizer	2002	21	Ogel
3391	Dash The Diver	2003	N/A	Dash (with harpoon)
4788	Ogel Mutant Ray	15 February 2002	68	two Skeleton Drones
4789	AT Aquatic Mech	2002	164	Dash
4790	Alpha Team Robot Diver	1 January 2002	32	Charge
4791	Alpha Team Sub-Surface Scooter	1 January 2002	43	Flex
4792	Alpha Team Navigator and ROV	1 January 2002	102	Cam
4793	Ogel Shark Sub	1 January 2002	111	two Skeleton Drones, Drone Pilot
4794	Alpha Team Command Patrol	1 January 2002	188	Radia, Crunch
4795	Ogel Underwater Base and AT Sub	1 January 2002	471	Dash, Ogel, two Skeleton Drones
4796	Ogel Mutant Squid	1 January 2002	61	Ogel
4797	Ogel Mutant Killer Whale	2002	56	Skeleton Drone
4798	Evil Ogel Attack	1 September 2002	20	Ogel
4799	Ogel Drone Octopus	2002	17	Skeleton Drone
4800	AT Jet Sub	1 September 2002	23	Dash

=== Mission Deep Freeze ===
8 sets were released from 2004 to 2005. Mission Deep Freeze toy sets displayed more technical upgrades such as control panels, a new logo and new packaging. The storyline focused on Alpha Team's mission to find Ogel before he froze the world using ice orbs. His main base was a mountain fortress in the form of a skull. All sets in this sub-theme featured the Alpha Mode transformation mechanic, allowing vehicles to convert between forms without disassembly.

Set number	Name	Release date	Pieces	Minifigures included
4742	Chill Speeder	1 June 2004	57	Flex
4743	Ice Blade	1 June 2004	107	Charge
4744	Tundra Tracker	1 June 2004	137	Diamond Tooth, Radia
4745	Blue Eagle versus Snow Crawler	1 June 2004	255	Dash, Ice Drone
4746	Mobile Command Center	1 June 2004	420	Charge, Radia, Tee-Vee, Ice Drone, Arrow
4748	Ogel's Mountain Fortress	1 June 2004	431	Dash, Ogel, Arrow, two Ice Drones
4770	Blizzard Blaster	1 January 2005	303	Zed, Ice Drone
4774	Scorpion Orb Launcher	1 January 2005	227	Super Ice Drone, Flex

== Video game ==
A video game, Lego Alpha Team, was developed by Digital Domain and published by Lego Media in September 2000 for Microsoft Windows, with a Game Boy Color version developed by Climax Studios and published in November of the same year.

== See also ==
- Lego Agents
- Lego Ultra Agents
