= Lego Vikings =

Lego theme

Vikings
- Subject: Vikings
- Availability: 2005–2007
- Total sets: 7

Lego Vikings is a discontinued Lego theme introduced in the fall of 2005. The theme is based on the Norse warriors, most commonly referred to as Vikings, as well as their mythology. It was designed to offer a unique blend of fantasy and history, with characters and creatures that were integrated into the sets in an unconventional way. It was originally planned for a one-year run, but due to its strong reception, the theme was extended for an additional year and subsequently discontinued in 2007.

== Theme and design ==
Lego Vikings was distinct for its focus on Norse mythology. The sets featured Viking warriors battling legendary creatures such as dragons, wyverns, wolves, and the Midgard Serpent (Jörmungandr). An aspect of the design was that most of the creatures in the sets were designed to scale with the minifigures, making them more realistic and integrated with the characters. The use of LEGO System, Technic, and Bionicle parts for creature design helped achieve an intricate and detailed aesthetic that was different from other sets of the time. The sets introduced several new elements, including custom Viking helmets, decorated shields, and dragon heads. Additionally, the Viking battle axe made its first appearance in this theme.

== Products ==
Set Number	Set	Year released	Pieces	Minifigures	Ref.
7015	Viking Warrior challenges the Fenris Wolf	2005	76	1	
7016	Viking Boat against the Wyvern Dragon	2005	112	2	
7017	Viking Catapult versus the Nidhogg Dragon	2005	225	2	
7018	Viking Ship challenges the Midgard Serpent	2005	578	6	
7019	Viking Fortress against the Fafnir Dragon	2005	1019	6	
7020	Army of Vikings with Heavy Artillery Wagon	2005	312	7	
7021	Viking Double Catapult versus the Armored Ofnir Dragon	2005	505	3	
851861	Vikings Chess Set	2006	341	24	
