= Lego Fabuland =

Lego theme

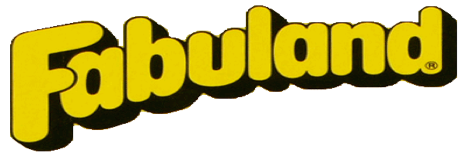
- Availability: 1979–1989 (EU) or 1983 (US)
- Total sets: 102
- Characters: Edward Elephant; Bonnie Bunny; Max Mouse; Mike Monkey; Paulette Poodle

Lego Fabuland is a discontinued theme and product range of Lego construction toys, aimed at young children. Introduced in 1979, the range aimed to fill the gap between Duplo and the standard Lego product ranges. Aimed at both boys and girls, the range encouraged storytelling, and was the first theme to be extended into books, clothing, and a claymation children's television show, Edward and Friends, that aired in the United Kingdom and Canada during the 1980s.

== Characters ==
Fabuland sets featured anthropomorphic animal characters. These pieces were larger than standard Lego minifigures, but smaller than Duplo figures, and included movable arms, legs and heads. Some of the characters appeared in multiple sets, were given names, and sometimes stories. This was the first Lego theme with named characters. Names of the characters varied by country.

== Style ==
Fabuland had a distinctive, friendly style, with various animal characters that each had a job or purpose in the town of Fabuland. Fabuland featured special elements that were larger than standard Lego bricks, but were fully compatible with regular Lego. Fabuland used a primary colour scheme and the sets were aimed for children between 4–8 as a transition from Duplo to Lego. Fabuland was unique due to the special elements, such as walls, roof elements, tables, chairs, boats and cars chassis. Larger Sets included buildings with story book like instructions and the theme also had many vehicles and individual characters with accessories. Fabuland is highly sought after today among collectors and there is a large fan base that keeps the theme alive via Lego fan sites.

Fabuland was discontinued in 1989 and many elements have since reappeared in other product lines, such as Mickey Mouse, Harry Potter, Belville, Castle/Kingdoms, Friends, Lego Games and others. The Fabuland line was referenced in the 2014 film The Lego Movie.

== Books ==
Instructions for sets contained text stories with illustrations. This was the first time Lego used inspirational material. There were also printed story books based on the Fabuland theme, including seven books based on the Fabuland television series Edward and Friends. The comic strip Fabuland, il paese delle fantaviglie ('Fabuland, the Country of Fantasies') was included in the Italian magazine Più e il suo Gioco.

== Other products ==
For the Fabuland theme Lego introduced such licensed products as key chains, books, table decorations, pens, playing cards, jigsaw puzzles, memory games (in association with Ravensburger), parachute toys, children cutlery sets (in association with BSF), bed cover sheets, children's clothing. Fabuland characters were attached to Nestlé's Orzoro jars. In 1979 in Germany Phonogram Inc. released on vinyl record radioplay "Stories from Fabuland" written by Sebastian Beck and directed by Michael Weckler.
