= Lego Vidiyo =

Discontinued product line and app created by the Lego Group

- Subject: Music videos
- Licensed from: Universal Music Group
- Availability: March 1, 2021; 5 years ago–January 31, 2022; 4 years ago
- Official website

Lego Vidiyo (stylised as VIDIYO) is a discontinued Lego theme and mobile app created by the Lego Group in collaboration with Universal Music Group. Released in March 2021, the product line allowed users to create their own music videos using the augmented reality-incorporated app in a style similar to TikTok.

In July 2021, the Lego Group announced that the theme would go on hiatus while Lego researched ways to improve their play experiences. In January 2022, it was officially discontinued. The Lego Vidiyo app, which was available for both iOS and Android, was discontinued in 2024.

== Description ==
The first wave of Vidiyo sets

Lego Vidiyo was a product line aimed at children ages 7–10 allowing people to create their own music videos by scanning Lego sets and minifigures using a mobile app incorporating augmented reality and music licensed from Universal's library. The sets featured minifigures known as Bandmates, singers themed after different music genres, as well as BeatBits, scannable tiles that generate special effects in the app, which could be stored in buildable BeatBoxes, buildable stages for minifigures contained in larger sets. Smaller mystery packs containing different BeatBits and individual Bandmates were also sold.

The Lego Vidiyo app was available for both iOS and Android. After constructing sets from the theme, users could select a Bandmate, customize their minifigure, and then pick a name for their band with other characters, before scanning the set with their phone and recording a short music video. Individual BeatBits used with the set added unique effects to the video. Videos could last for up to twenty seconds.

The app contained a social media-style public feed to which finished videos could be uploaded to. As part of the safety measures included with the app, content went through a moderation system before being publicly available. Users could comment with emojis on others' videos.

== History ==
In April 2020, it was publicly announced that the Lego Group had entered a partnership with Universal Music Group to develop a new line of sets that would release in 2021. The theme was officially announced on January 26, 2021. Early concept art for the theme was created in 2018. The Lego Group met with Universal Music Group that same year at Abbey Road Studios in London, England, and discussed the concept with them.

The individual sets were officially announced on February 16 and released on March 1. A second wave of sets were released in the summer. As part of the collaboration with Universal Music Group, a record deal was signed with the label Astralwerks. The deal involved the release of a single titled "Shake", featuring the virtual singer L.L.A.M.A. alongside singers Ne-Yo and Carmen DeLeon. The character of L.L.A.M.A (Note: Abbreviation of Love, Laughter, and Music Always) was specifically created for the Vidiyo line and based on the DJ Llama minifigure from the sets. An ad campaign featuring L.L.A.M.A was also aired alongside The Voice UK. The identity of the singer playing the character was kept anonymous.

Other marketing ventures included a collaboration with Kidz Bop and a line of clothing produced by Adidas. The Vidiyo Music Fest, a three-day event based on the product line, was hosted in Legoland Florida in September 2021.

In July 2021, the Lego Group announced that the theme would go on hiatus to respond to feedback in regards to improving the product experience – although the sets still would continue to be sold – with the plan to "pilot some new ideas in 2022, then release new play experiences in 2023 and beyond." In January 2022, it was announced that after conducting further research, the Lego Group had made the decision to discontinue all Vidiyo products. The sets were discontinued later that month. The Lego Vidiyo app continued to be supported for two more years until it was retired in January 2024.

== Reception ==
Jordan Minor of PCMag gave the app and product line 3.5/5 stars—considered "Good" on the website's rating scale—praising the concept but criticizing the app's limited controls, stating that "its true creative potential feels a tad stifled." Ciara O'Brien of The Irish Times gave the theme a 4/5 star rating and called the experience "well thought-out" with "enough variety in the BeatBits and figures to recreate videos over and over again". Craig Grannell of electronic magazine Stuff also gave the product line a 4/5 star rating.

Scott Stein of CNET, when speaking of app, stated that "the Lego part feels more like an afterthought," but still felt the theme was "fun". Andrew Liszewski of Gizmodo also spoke positively of it but called it "an experience squarely aimed at kids". Leigh Stark of Australian website Pickr gave the app a 4.3/5 star rating, stating it was "probably the craziest toy tie-in we’ve ever seen". Nine.com.au called the theme "something special" but also stated "kids [...] who can navigate the hurdles required before hitting the record button will undoubtedly have fun, but the app must be streamlined and offer more [...] over time if it's to unlock its own potential."

Media sources described the app as being similar to TikTok but for younger users. Despite the theme's hiatus, the Lego Group stated the product had tested well while being developed and had also received positive reception afterwards. 41335 The Boombox was awarded Best Lego Set at Popular Mechanics's Game and Toy Awards in 2021.

== See also ==
- Lego Super Mario
- Lego Life
