= Lego Studios =

Product line released in 2000

- Subject: Filmmaking
- Licensed from: Steven Spielberg; Universal Pictures; Sony Pictures
- Availability: 2000–2003
- Total sets: 55

Lego Studios was a product line released by Lego in 2000 that allowed people to create their own movies. The main set came with a camera and software. Such videos are now known as brickfilms.

== History ==
The theme began with the MovieMaker set in October 2000. The set, featuring Steven Spielberg, came with a Lego-compatible camera. After making $10 million in sales that year, it was released internationally, with more sets releasing the following year. Sets for Jurassic Park III and Spider-Man were released in 2001 and 2002, respectively.

The 2013 book Brick by Brick: How Lego Rewrote the Rules of Innovation reports that although the theme did well in the United States, the international release was deemed a flop and sets were often discounted by retailers due to poor sales.

== Reception ==
AllGame gave a rating of 4.5 out of 5 and wrote: "The product is a perfect complement to a player's imagination, once the intuitive editing program is learned, and searching for that perfect shot can become addictive."

== Awards and nominations ==
During the 2000 TOTY Awards hosted by the Toy Association, the Steven Spielberg MovieMaker Set was awarded both Toy of the Year and Innovative Toy of the Year.
