= Lego Super Mario =

Lego theme licensed by Nintendo

- Subject: Super Mario, Luigi's Mansion, Donkey Kong, Mario Kart
- Licensed from: Nintendo
- Availability: August 1, 2020–present
- Total sets: 178
- Official website

Lego Super Mario is a Lego theme based on the platform game series Super Mario created by Japanese game designer Shigeru Miyamoto. It is licensed from Nintendo. The theme was first introduced on August 1, 2020. Since its release, the Lego Super Mario theme has received generally positive reviews.

== Overview ==
Mario stomping a Goomba in the "My First Course" set

The Lego Super Mario theme was the result of the collaboration between The Lego Group and Nintendo for the 35th anniversary of the 1985 game Super Mario Bros. The sets are essentially a mix between a Lego set and a video game, where people can build real life versions of 2D Super Mario levels, including grasslands, deserts and Bowser's Castle. The key part of the theme is the interactive Super Mario figurine. Unlike traditional Lego figurines, the Mario figure is large and electronic, (Note: It runs on two AAA batteries.) with the eyes, mouth and chest use an LED display. Another key feature of the figurine is the scanner on the bottom of the Mario figurine, and Bluetooth connectivity. The scanner uses colors or machine-readable codes to operate. The scanner can change the LED display to affect the expressions or actions of Mario. For example, if the scanner scans the color red, Mario will detect it as lava and pretends to "lose a life". Codes can be placed on enemies, ? Blocks, power-ups, Warp Pipes and flag poles to display action on the chest display, like coins when Mario defeats an enemy. All of these produce sound effects, attributing the Mario franchise. The Mario figurine utilises Bluetooth to connect to the official app. The app can also be used for challenges, as a camera and as a digital instruction booklet, and to update the firmware on the Mario figurine. The theme was sold with 11 sets of Mario levels, 4 costume packs which reference previous Mario power ups (Note: These are Fire Mario, Propeller Mario, Cat Mario and Builder Mario.) and a blind-bag collection featuring 10 reoccurring Mario enemies.

Lego Nintendo Entertainment System

In July 2020, Nintendo unveiled the Lego Nintendo Entertainment System. This set includes a full size replica of the console with a cartridge and controller and a miniature CRT TV which displays gameplay of Super Mario Bros.' World 1-1. The TV supplies a crank, which when turned, can make the game scroll manipulating the 8-bit Mario on the screen move. While unrelated to the original theme, the TV can connect with the interactive Mario figurine, causing it to make sound effects when winding the crank. Inside the console is a homage to the warp zone. This is the largest set out of the whole theme.

In addition, The Lego Group built a life-sized model of Super Mario who appears in the video game. Super Mario contained a total of 23,000 Lego bricks and stands at 1.2 metres tall. Just like the small version, he features a screen on his chest, for his eyes and for his mouth. Pressing the various buttons will elicit different reactions that match up with what happens when regular Lego Super Mario stands on certain types of bricks.

In 2022, The Lego Group built a king-sized model of Bowser who appears in the video game. Bowser contained a total of 663,900 Lego bricks and stands at 14-foot-tall. A king-sized model of Bowser displayed in San Diego Comic-Con.

On March 10, 2026, to coincide with Mario Day, Lego and Nintendo revealed that sets featuring Super Mario minifigures will release sometime in 2027, via a video of the new Mario minifigure on Instagram.

== Development ==
Talks began between The Lego Group and Nintendo in Summer 2015, where the upper management of Nintendo asked to collaborate with the company. This followed into a discussion which generated many ideas, before voting on what idea to use. The idea that was the most popular was the idea of an interactive figure. The team did not have much to work with, with the only words to work with were "do something that only these two companies could do together. It's a Lego product, but it's also a Nintendo product". Lead designer, Jonathan Bennink took some inspiration from the toys-to-life video game Lego Dimensions, but in reverse by bringing the video game to life using toys. The team also took inspiration from Super Mario Maker, taking the idea of players constructing Mario levels and incorporating it into Lego building. The sets themselves took inspiration from many mainline Mario games, however describing the result being "a mix between Super Mario Bros. and also 3D World, with the rounded corners".

With the figure itself, the concept for making Mario took two years. Bennink and his teams brainstormed a wide range of ideas and prototypes that took advantage of different technologies such as augmented reality and virtual reality. Another design involved the figure having a giant screen to display Mario's face, but decided against it due to the vacant void left when being turned off. Bennink then came up with an interactive 3x3 brick with a display, something of which the team had not seen before, and decided to settle on it. The design went through rigorous testing for durability and strength, resulting in Nintendo dropping 6,000 prototypes to ensure its quality. Many prototypes were taken to Kyoto workshops for further testing, with the help of Nintendo's creative leader, Takashi Tezuka. These visits occurred often before they were stopped due to the COVID-19 pandemic. The sound effects that are emitted from the figure were newly recorded lines from Mario voice actor Charles Martinet, as well as music from composer Koji Kondo.

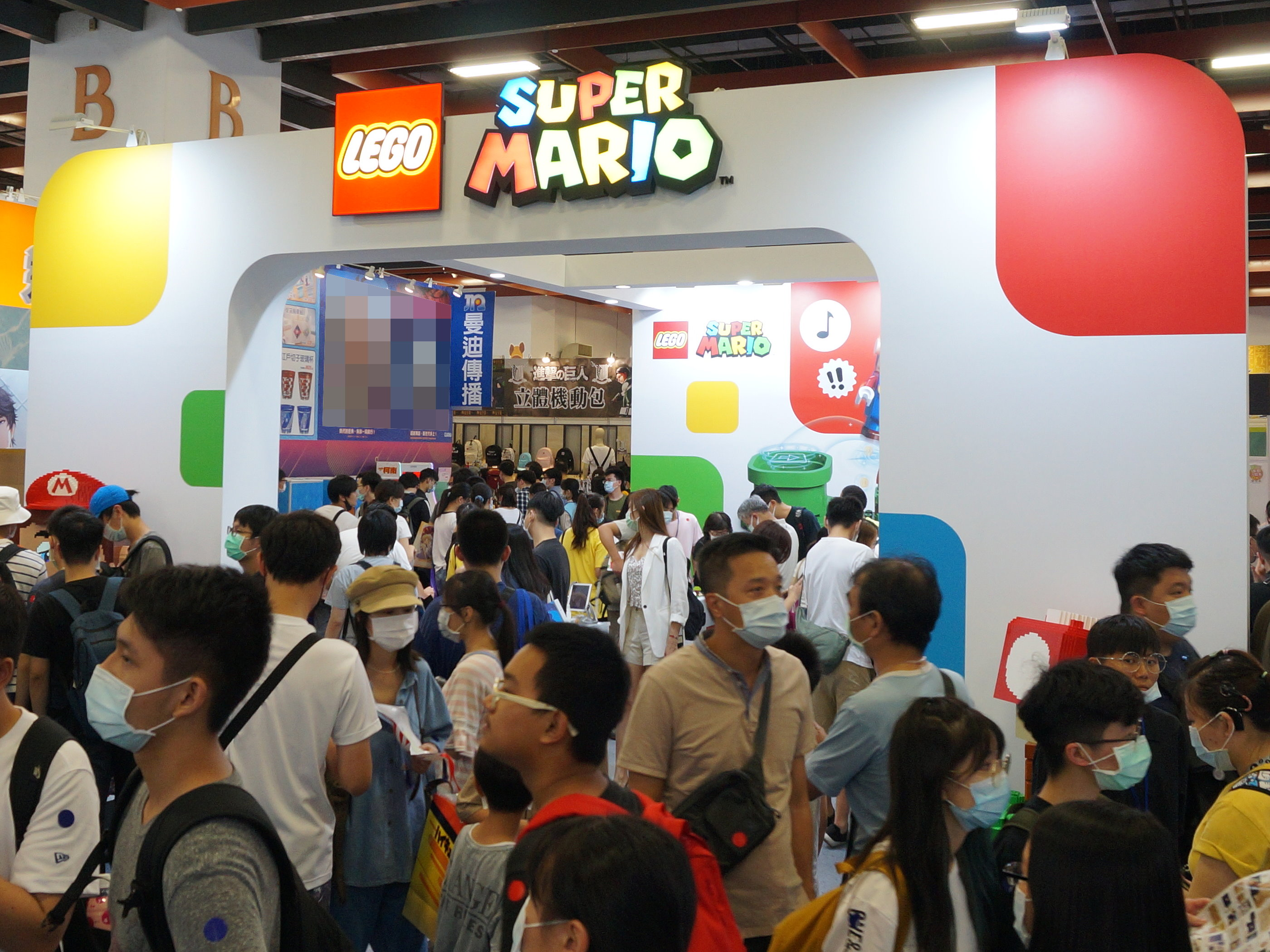
A Lego Super Mario booth at Lego Trading expo in Taiwan

The Lego Super Mario theme was first teased on March 10, 2020, also known as MAR10 / National Mario Day, on both Nintendo and Lego's Twitter accounts, depicting Mario's LED display. The theme itself was then official revealed two days later, when Nintendo released a trailer detailing the sets and overview. Official Lego Stores set up demos for the theme, allowing customers to test it out. The Lego Nintendo Entertainment System was first leaked online by Chinese website VJGamer and German websites Promo Bricks and StoneWars, leaking price and date info. On July 13, 2020, the Lego Twitter account posted a silhouette of the set before being officially revealed the next day. Both the theme and the NES set released on August 1, 2020. Three sets were made available on July 10, 2020. In Italy, Lego Italia partnered up with Trenitalia in July 2020 to advertise the Lego Super Mario theme on one of their ETR 521 "Rock" electric trains, which would operate between Orte and Fiumicino Airport.

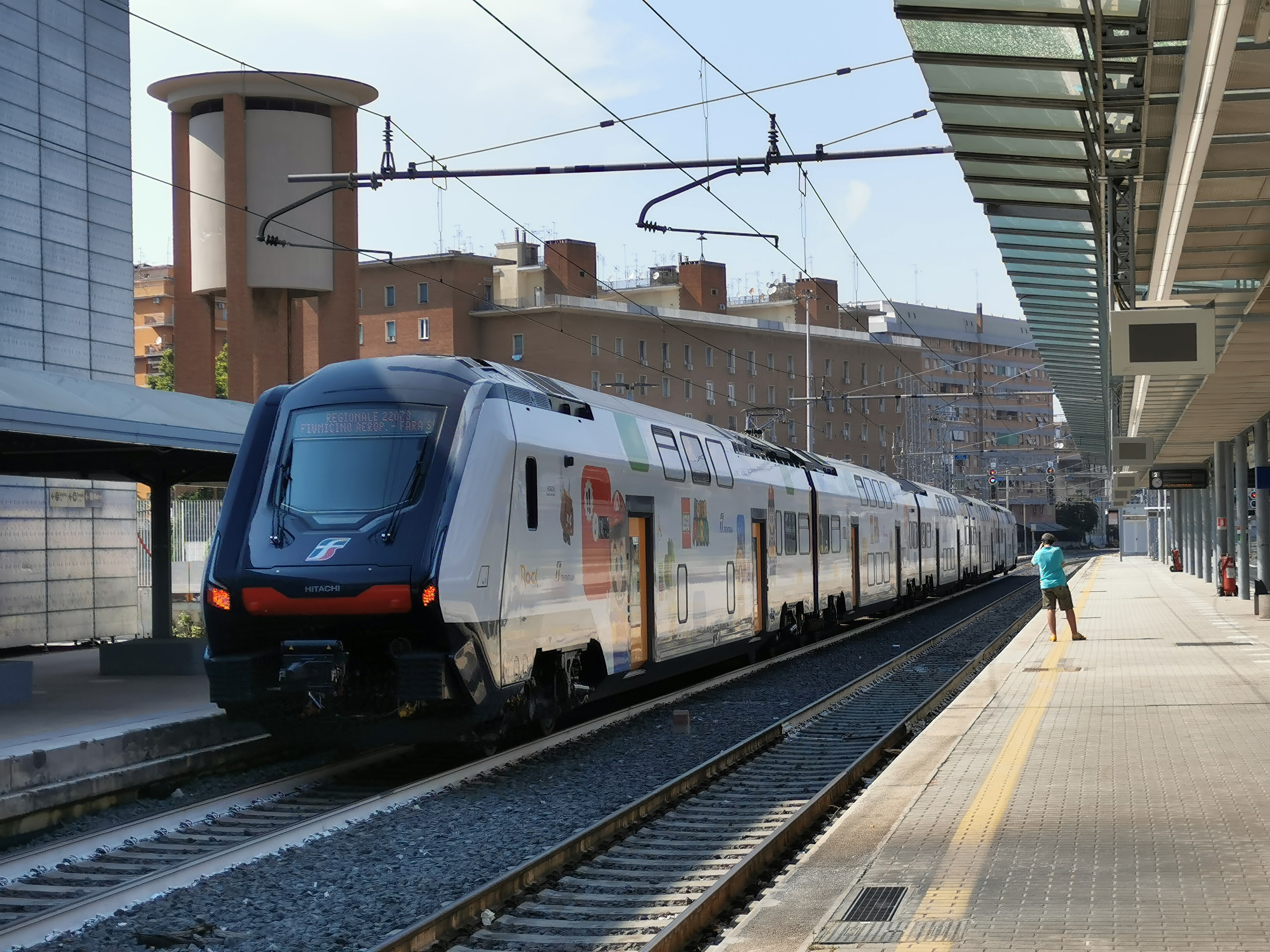
The Trenitalia ETR521 Rock with Lego Super Mario livery at Roma Tiburtina railway station

In July 2020, Design Manager Jonathan Bennink and Marketing Director Christian Munk discussed the Lego Group and Nintendo became close collaborators on Super Mario. Jonathan Bennink explained:

But there is also LEGO DNA at the core of it because after that rough patch that we had, with management asking "where are the bricks?", in one of the online brainstorms we came up with the idea of the start and the finish. And that anything you build in between out of LEGO bricks is a level. This was also the time where we added the colour sensor to it and this meant that Mario didn't just react to the RFID bricks but also any other bricks, because he can read the basic LEGO colours. Now the whole level became interactive. Then we came up with the idea of collecting coins and you can get coins from jumping on the enemies, from beating the challenges. We added a timer to it, you can get blocks that will give you a little bit more time, for example on the Piranha Slide where you spend a lot of time balancing, you want more time. That is how it evolved into what it is now.

Christian Munk explained, "I think we have a unique partnership with Nintendo. This is a LEGO line and the LEGO development process but this has truly been cocreated together with the partner – three times a week we are having Skype calls with Nintendo, they have been helping us as Jonathan said with the tech part and also with the game part, what makes this fun for kids to play, so it's a good Nintendo and LEGO experience. It's all about being creative, so what we are hoping is the kids will create the coolest and wackiest creations possible and then play them out to see how many coins they can collect."

Jonathan Bennink revealed why the upcoming theme does not use minifigures and how the interactive character was developed. Jonathan Bennink explained, "Mario himself looks like he is built out of fused LEGO bricks. For instance, his tummy is the car element, the car hood, and his hair is 1×1 LEGO set plates, so he looks like he is built up from LEGO bricks. Then the enemies followed suit, because the line is all about building and creativity we also felt that the enemies needed to be built rather than moulded out of one piece. Boo is super rounded in the game but he is square because it is a LEGO version."

Jonathan Bennink and Christian Munk revealed why Super Mario took four years to develop and what they learned from Lego Dimensions. Jonathan Bennink explained, "Yes it did, our bosses are not too happy with it but we made something in the end, so that's good. It's definitely about finding the play recipe, that took one and a half years, from that initial idea of an interactive character, then what do you do with him? Because a lot of tech toys out there, they are fun for maybe a day, and then they drop off and here we hope there is a longevity in building levels, just coming up with your own ideas and putting your own creativity into it, and then sharing that with people around you. That just took a little while, then we had to make everything, and then Nintendo was also very concerned about quality and safety so everything that we shipped to them, they dropped five thousand times as well to make sure that it is strong." and Christian Munk explained, "Just to build on that, what also makes me really proud is we have probably one of the first truly interactive play experiences from the LEGO Group. But also what makes it truly unique is it is a hand held interactive play experience where you have the LEGO Super Mario figure in the middle but then you can build this whole world of interactive play around, so you actually build the world yourself. Of course you can follow instructions but you can creatively free build your own level, it's not special bricks, he reacts to the colour of the bricks, so you can also use the bricks you already have to build a cool world, and then he reacts both to the way you play out the world but also how you have built it, and that's what I am particularly proud of in this line."

Jonathan Bennink discussed the building instructions are digital rather than the traditional printed instructions and explained, "we simply couldn't explain this new way to play on paper. We tried to prototype that a lot, believe me, with arrows kind of showing how to jump with Mario [...] on paper, it's just too difficult to explain. Kids just skip it. Basically, anything that's not a building instruction they skip because they think it's optional. So by putting the building instructions in the app, it also allows us to put videos in the app, and a 2 or 3 second video tells so much more than a page with say 15 arrows kind of flying around trying to explain a movement. And we know from other projects that kids really appreciate the 3D building instructions because they can get a good 3D view of the build and see exactly where the brick is being placed."

== List of sets ==
This is a list of all current Lego Super Mario sets.
| Number | Name | Pieces | Year | Notes |
|---|---|---|---|---|
| 30385 | Super Mushroom Surprise Pack | 18 | 2020 | Free with qualifying purchases on the Lego shop website or at brand stores. |
| 30389 | Fuzzy and Mushroom Platform Pack | 39 | 2021 | Free with qualifying purchases on the Lego shop website or at brand stores. |
| 30509 | Yellow Yoshi's Fruit Tree | 46 | 2022 | Free with qualifying purchases on the Lego shop website or at brand stores. |
| 30702 | Toad (Pit Crew) | 39 | 2025 | Includes a Lego toy figure of a Mario Kart character - Toad in a pit crew outfit. |
| 40414 | Monty Mole & Super Mushroom Expansion Set | 163 | 2020 | Only available from preorders of the "Adventures with Mario Starter Course" or from any purchases at official Lego stores. Includes Lego toy figures of iconic Super Mario enemies - Monty Mole |
| 77907 | Toad's Special Hideaway Expansion Set | 120 | 2020 | Was planned to be a 2020 San Diego Comic-Con exclusive, but with cancellation of the event this limited edition set was distributed through Target. |
| 71360 | Adventures with Mario Starter Course | 231 | 2020 | Includes Lego toy figures of Mario and enemies; Goomba, and Bowser Jr. |
| 71361 | Character Packs | 23 | 2020 | Every pack contains a buildable character and action brick to play within Lego Super Mario games – it could be a Paragoomba, Fuzzy, Spiny, Buzzy Beetle, Bullet Bill, Bob-omb, Eep Cheep, Blooper, Urchin, or Peepa. |
| 71362 | Guarded Fortress Expansion Set | 468 | 2020 | Includes Lego toy figures of enemies - Bob-omb, Koopa Troopa, and Piranha Plant. |
| 71363 | Desert Pokey Expansion Set | 180 | 2020 | Includes Lego toy figures of enemies; a buildable Pokey cactus-like figure and a Monty Mole figure. |
| 71364 | Whomp's Lava Trouble Expansion Set | 133 | 2020 | Includes Lego toy figures of enemies; Whomp and Lava Bubble figures. |
| 71365 | Piranha Plant Power Slide Expansion Set | 217 | 2020 | Includes Lego toy figures of enemies; Goomba and Koopa Troopa. |
| 71366 | Boomer Bill Barrage Expansion Set | 132 | 2020 | Includes Lego toy figures of enemies; 2 'flying' Boomer Bills and a Shy Guy. |
| 71367 | Mario's House & Yoshi Expansion Set | 205 | 2020 | Includes Lego toy figures of figures - Yoshi and Goomba figures. |
| 71368 | Toad's Treasure Hunt Expansion Set | 464 | 2020 | Includes Lego toy figures of figures - Goomba, 2 Cheep Cheeps, and Toad and Toadette figures. |
| 71369 | Bowser's Castle Boss Battle Expansion Set | 1010 | 2020 | Includes Lego toy figures of enemies - Bowser, Dry Bones, Boo and Lava Bubble figures. |
| 71370 | Fire Mario Power-Up Pack | 11 | 2020 | Costume for the Super Mario figurine, giving it the ability to use fireballs to defeat enemies quicker. |
| 71371 | Propeller Mario Power-Up Pack | 13 | 2020 | Costume for the Super Mario figurine, giving it the ability to fly. |
| 71372 | Cat Mario Power-Up Pack | 11 | 2020 | Costume for the Super Mario figurine, giving it the ability to climb walls. |
| 71373 | Builder Mario Power-Up Pack | 10 | 2020 | Costume for the Super Mario figurine, giving it the ability to stomp the ground to collect coins. |
| 71374 | Nintendo Entertainment System | 2646 | 2020 | Not under the Super Mario brand, but can connect with the Mario figurine. |
| 71376 | Thwomp Drop Expansion Set | 393 | 2020 | Only available from Amazon and Lego stores in the United States and Canada. |
| 71377 | King Boo and the Haunted Yard Expansion Set | 431 | 2020 | Only available at Target and Lego stores in the United States and Toys "R" Us stores in Canada. |
| 71380 | Master Your Adventure Maker Set | 366 | 2021 | Includes Lego toy figures of four enemy characters – Larry, Goomba, Bob-omb, and Paratroopa, along with 3 customizable blocks. 2 of them are ?-blocks, and one being a timer block. |
| 71381 | Chain Chomp Jungle Encounter Expansion Set | 160 | 2021 | This toy playset includes two Lego figures of enemies – a Chain Chomp and Bramball. |
| 71382 | Piranha Plant Puzzling Challenge Expansion Set | 267 | 2021 | Includes Lego toy figures of enemies; 2 Piranha Plants and Spiny. |
| 71383 | Wiggler's Poison Swamp Expansion Set | 374 | 2021 | Includes Lego toy figures of a Wiggler, Goomba and Paratroopa. |
| 71384 | Penguin Mario Power-Up Pack | 18 | 2021 | Costume for the Super Mario figurine, giving it the ability to belly slide along the ground. |
| 71385 | Tanooki Mario Power-Up Pack | 13 | 2021 | Costume for the Super Mario figurine, giving it the ability to spin and run to collect coins. |
| 71386 | Character Packs – Series 2 | 24 | 2021 | 10 unique Lego Super Mario toy characters to collect: Huckit Crab, Spiny Cheep Cheep, Ninji, Foo, Parachute Goomba, Para-Beetle, Poison Mushroom, Thwimp, Fly Guy and Bone Goomba. |
| 71387 | Adventures with Luigi Starter Course | 280 | 2021 | Includes Lego toy figures of Luigi, Boom Boom, Pink Yoshi, and Bone Goomba. |
| 71388 | Boss Sumo Bro Topple Tower Expansion Set | 231 | 2021 | Includes Lego toy figures of Boss Sumo Bro and Crowber. |
| 71389 | Lakitu Sky World Expansion Set | 484 | 2021 | Includes Lego toy figures of Lakitu, Fuzzy, and Bullet Bill. |
| 71390 | Reznor Knockdown Expansion Set | 862 | 2021 | Includes Lego toy figures of two Reznors, Blue Toad and Grrrol. |
| 71391 | Bowser's Airship Expansion Set | 1152 | 2021 | Includes Lego toy figures of Magikoopa, Goomba and Rocky Wrench. |
| 71392 | Frog Mario Power-Up Pack | 11 | 2021 | Costume for the Mario figure, giving it the ability to jump to collect coins. |
| 71393 | Bee Mario Power-Up Pack | 13 | 2021 | Costume for the Mario figure, giving it the ability to fly around to collect coins. |
| 71394 | Character Packs – Series 3 | 23 | 2021 | Every pack contains a buildable character and action brick to play within Lego Super Mario games – it could be a Swoop, Boo, ScuttleBug, Crowber, Torpedo Ted, 1-Up Mushroom, Amp, Galoomba, Bony Beetle or Parachute Bob-Omb. |
| 71395 | Super Mario 64 ? Block | 2064 | 2021 | Can connect with the Mario figure. |
| 71396 | Bowser Junior's Clown Car Expansion Set | 84 | 2022 | Vehicle for the Super Mario figurine to ride in. Also contains a Bob-omb. |
| 71397 | Lab And Poltergust Expansion Set | 179 | 2022 | Includes Lego toy figures of Luigi's Mansion enemies and figures - Professor Egad, and Golden Ghost, and a Poltergust costume for the Lego Luigi figurine. |
| 71398 | Dorrie's Beach Front Expansion Set | 229 | 2022 | Includes Lego toy figures of Dorrie and Huckit Crab. |
| 71399 | Entryway Expansion Set | 504 | 2022 | Includes Lego toy figures of Luigi's Mansion enemies and figures - Polterpup, Boo, and Bogmire. |
| 71400 | Big Urchin Beach Ride Expansion Set | 536 | 2022 | Includes Lego toy figures of Big Urchin, Yellow Yoshi, Dolphin, and Cheep Cheep. |
| 71401 | Haunt And Seek Expansion Set | 877 | 2022 | Includes Lego toy figures of Luigi's Mansion enemies and figures - King Boo, Toad, TrashCan Ghost and a Grabbing Ghost. |
| 71402 | Character Packs – Series 4 | 29 | 2022 | Every pack contains a buildable character and action brick to play within Lego Super Mario games – it could be a Stingby, Bully, Goombrat, Ant Trooper, Mechakoopa, Scaredy Rat, Freezie, Coin Coffer, Para-Biddybud or a Baby Penguin. |
| 71403 | Adventures with Peach Starter Course | 354 | 2022 | Includes Lego toy figures of Lemmy Koopa, Yellow Toad and Lava Bubble. |
| 71404 | Goomba's Shoe Expansion Set | 76 | 2022 | Vehicle for the Mario figure to ride in. It also contains a Goomba. |
| 71405 | Fuzzy Flippers Expansion Set | 154 | 2022 | Includes Lego toy figures of 2 Fuzzies. |
| 71406 | Yoshi's Gift House Expansion Set | 246 | 2022 | Includes Lego toy figures of Yoshi and Monty Mole. |
| 71407 | Cat Peach Suit And Frozen Tower Expansion Set | 494 | 2022 | Includes Lego toy figures of Cat Goomba, Magikoopa and Toad. Also contains a cat power-up suit for Lego Peach. |
| 71408 | Peach's Castle Expansion Set | 1216 | 2022 | Includes Lego toy figures of Ludwig Von Koopa, Toadette, Goomba, Bowser and Bob-omb. |
| 71409 | Big Spike's Cloudtop Challenge Expansion Set | 540 | 2022 | Includes Lego toy figures of Big Spike, Boomerang Bro and Piranha Plant. |
| 71410 | Character Packs — Series 5 | 47 | 2022 | Every pack contains a buildable character and action brick to play within Lego Super Mario games – it could be a Blue Shy Guy, Red Yoshi, Purple Toad, Waddlewing, Nabbit, Hammer Bro, Toady or Baby Yoshi. |
| 71411 | The Mighty Bowser | 2807 | 2022 | Can connect with the Mario, Luigi and Peach figures. |
| 71412 | Big Bad Island Expansion Set | 354 | 2022 | Includes Lego toy figures of Goomba, Giant Goomba, Giant Red Koopa Troopa and Iggy Koopa. Only available at Target and Lego stores. |
| 71413 | Character Packs - Series 6 | 52 | 2023 | Every pack contains a buildable character and action brick to play within Lego Super Mario games – it could be a Birdo, Green Toad, Ice Bro, Bramball, 2 Cat Goombas (In 1 pack), a Blooper (with 3 baby Bloopers), a Sumo Bro and a Spike. |
| 71414 | Conkdor's Noggin Bopper Expansion Set | 130 | 2023 | Includes Lego toy figures of only a Conkdor. |
| 71415 | Ice Mario Suit and Frozen World Expansion Set | 105 | 2023 | Includes Lego toy figures of Cooligan and Goomba, also contains an Ice Suit compatible with Mario, Luigi and Peach. |
| 71416 | Lava Wave Ride Expansion Set | 218 | 2023 | Includes Lego toy figures of Fire Bro and 2 Lava Bubbles. |
| 71417 | Fliprus Snow Adventure Expansion Set | 567 | 2023 | Includes Lego toy figures of Red Koopa Troopa, Freezie, Baby Penguin and Fliprus |
| 71418 | Creativity Toolbox Maker Set | 588 | 2023 | Includes Lego toy figures of Wendy O. Koopa, Blue Yoshi and Goomba, along with customizable blocks and items, 3 fruits, a gift box and Super Mushroom. |
| 71419 | Peach's Garden Balloon Ride Expansion Set | 443 | 2023 | Includes Lego toy figures of Pom Pom, Lava Bubble, Blue Toad and Pink Yoshi. Only available at Target and Lego stores. |
| 71420 | Rambi The Rhino Expansion Set | 106 | 2023 | Vehicle for the Super Mario figurine to ride in. |
| 71421 | Dixie Kong's Jungle Jam Expansion Set | 174 | 2023 | Includes Lego toy figures of Donkey Kong figures Dixie Kong and Sqauwks. |
| 71422 | Picnic at Mario's house Expansion Set | 259 | 2023 | Includes Lego toy figure Yellow Yoshi |
| 71423 | Dry Bowser Castle Battle Expansion Set | 1321 | 2023 | Includes Lego toy figures of Dry Bowser, Bone Piranha Plant, Bone Goomba, Magmaargh and Purple Toad. |
| 71424 | Donkey Kong's Tree House Expansion Set | 443 | 2023 | Includes Lego toy figures of Donkey Kong figures - Donkey Kong and Cranky Kong. |
| 71425 | Diddy Kong's Mine Cart Ride Expansion Set | 1157 | 2023 | Includes Lego toy figures of Donkey Kong enemies and figures - Diddy Kong, Funky Kong, Mole Miner and Snaggles. |
| 71426 | Piranha Plant | 540 | 2023 | A Lego figure of the Piranha Plant enemy from the Super Mario series. |
| 71427 | Larry's and Morton's Airships Expansion Set | 1062 | 2023 | Includes Lego toy figures of Super Mario enemies and figures - Larry and Morton. Only available at Target and Lego stores. |
| 71428 | Yoshis' Egg-cellent Forest Expansion Set | 107 | 2024 | Includes Lego toy figures of Super Mario figures - Pink Yoshi and Yellow Yoshi. |
| 71429 | Nabbit at Toad's Shop | 230 | 2024 | Includes Lego toy figures of Nabbit and Yellow Toad. |
| 71430 | Penguin Family Snow Adventure | 228 | 2024 | Includes Lego toy figures of Mother Penguin and Baby Penguin. |
| 71431 | Bowser's Muscle Car | 458 | 2024 | Includes Lego toy figure of Bowser. |
| 71432 | Dorrie's Sunken Shipwreck Adventure | 500 | 2024 | Includes Lego toy figures of Blooper, Cheep Cheep, Cheep Chomp and Dorrie. |
| 71433 | Goombas' Playground | 173 | 2024 | Includes Lego Goomba toy figures. |
| 71434 | Soda Jungle Maker Set | 598 | 2024 | Includes Lego toy figures of Pink Shy Guy, Wiggler, and Piranha Plant. |
| 71435 | Battle with Roy at Peach's Castle | 738 | 2024 | Includes Lego toy figures of Roy, a Chain Chomp, and Toad. |
| 71436 | King Boo's Haunted Mansion | 932 | 2024 | Includes Lego toy figures of King Boo, a Yellow Baby Yoshi, a Dry Bones, and a Boo. |
| 71437 | The Bowser Express Train | 1392 | 2024 | Includes Lego toy figures of A Hammer Bro, Boom Boom, 2 Goombas, and 2 Para-Biddybuds. |
| 71438 | Super Mario World: Mario & Yoshi | 1215 | 2024 | Based on the Super Mario World video game. Can interact with the Mario, Luigi, and Peach figures. |
| 71439 | Adventures with Interactive LEGO Mario | 218 | 2024 | Includes Lego toy figures of an interactive LEGO Mario figure, plus Bowser Jr., Yoshi, and a Goomba. |
| 71440 | Adventures with Interactive LEGO Luigi | 210 | 2024 | Includes Lego toy figures of an interactive LEGO Luigi toy figure, plus Kamek, a Pink Baby Yoshi, and a Boo. |
| 71441 | Adventures with Interactive LEGO Peach | 208 | 2024 | Includes Lego toy figures of an interactive LEGO Peach princess toy figure, plus Lakitu, a Yellow Toad, and a Lava Bubble. |
| 72031 | Yoshi Bike | 133 | 2025 | Includes a Lego toy figure of a Mario Kart racer and vehicle - Light Blue Yoshi and Yoshi Bike. |
| 72032 | Standard Kart | 174 | 2025 | Includes a Lego toy figure of a Mario Kart vehicle - Standard Kart. |
| 72033 | Donkey Kong & DK Jumbo | 387 | 2025 | Includes a Lego toy figure of a Mario Kart racer and vehicle - Donkey Kong and DK Jumbo. |
| 72034 | Baby Mario vs. Baby Luigi | 321 | 2025 | Includes Lego toy figures of Mario Kart racers and vehicles - Baby Mario, Baby Luigi, Biddybuggy, and Trispeeder. |
| 72035 | Toad's Garage | 390 | 2025 | Includes a Lego toy figure of an Mario Kart vehicle - B Dasher. |
| 72036 | Baby Peach & Grand Prix Set | 823 | 2025 | Includes Lego toy figures of Mario Kart racers and vehicles - Toad, Baby Peach, Lemmy, and Standard Bike, Wild Wiggler and Landship. |
| 72037 | Mario & Standard Kart | 1972 | 2025 | A Lego set of Super Mario and the Standard Kart. |
| 72038 | Wario & King Boo | 512 | 2025 | Includes Lego toy figures of Mario Kart racers and vehicles - Wario and Boo, Badwagon and Teddy Buggy. |
| 72039 | Bowser's Castle | 1068 | 2025 | Includes Lego toy figures of Mario Kart racers and vehicles - Bowser and Yoshi, Standard Quad and Mach 8. |
| 72040 | Captain Toad's Camp | 159 | 2025 | Includes Lego toy figures of Super Mario enemies and figures - Captain Toad and a Goomba. |
| 72041 | Party at Toad's House | 276 | 2025 | Includes Lego toy figures of Super Mario figures - Blue Toad and Green Toad. |
| 72042 | Prince Florian & Castle Bowser | 1251 | 2025 | Includes Lego toy figures of Super Mario enemies and figures - Prince Florian and Pink Yoshi, Wonder Bowser Jr. and a Fiery Note Piranha. |
| 72043 | Interactive LEGO Mario & Standard Kart | 278 | 2025 | Includes Lego a toy figure of an Mario Kart racer and vehicle - Mario and Standard Kart. |
| 72044 | Piranha Plant Power-Up Pursuit | 588 | 2025 | Includes Lego toy figures of Mario Kart racers and vehicles - Toadette and Koopa Troopa, Cat Cruiser and Tanooki Kart. |
| 72045 | Shy Guy & P-Wing | 249 | 2025 | Includes Lego a toy figure of an Mario Kart racer and vehicle - Shy Guy and P-Wing. |
| 72050 | Luigi & Mach 8 | 2234 | 2026 | A Lego set of Luigi and the Mach 8. |

== App ==
An app titled Lego Super Mario was developed by software development studio Ustwo for Android, iOS, and Fire OS. It was released on July 20, 2020. Since 2021, players have been able to activate the experience via the app and are not restricted to using only Lego Mario and Luigi, but can instead use any combination of the two characters.

== Reception ==
=== Super Mario theme ===
The theme received generally positive reviews, with most claiming it is a perfect item for kids, but can work for Lego and Mario fans. CNET's Scott Stein described the theme to be "solid summer entertainment" which allowed for something to do during lockdown, praising the cute, simplistic to build sets as well as the amount of intractability with the theme but criticized the overwhelming amount of open design and a lack of replayability. Many reviews compared the idea to other Nintendo products such as Super Mario Maker and Nintendo Labo. For example, Alex Olney of Nintendo Life wrote how he realized this was like Mario Maker in a physical form. In the review, he summarized that the Mario figurine is very charming and quite likable as well as citing the simplicity being better suited for younger audiences. However, he did criticize that the level designs and concepts lacked the same charm that the figurine had. Mike Fahey of Kotaku discussed that the best way to play with the theme was to use imagination to enhance the experience. With the figurine, whilst the design started to grow on him, the figurine turned off was unsettling. He felt as a Lego collector, he felt the theme lacked a certain element, adding that more interactive figures could help increase the experience of the theme. In The Telegraph's review, Tom Hoggins felt that the homages in the sets added charm to the overall product, praising the idea as a whole, but did point out that the price range of the sets did not seem to match with the age range, adding the pricing was more for Lego collectors.

In July 2020, Lego Super Mario was shortlisted for the Play Creators Awards 2020. In October 2020, Adventures with Mario Starter Course was listed on the Tesco's top ten toys for Christmas 2020. In November 2020, Adventures with Mario Starter Course was listed on the Top Toys for Christmas 2020 as selected by ITV's This Morning.

=== Lego NES ===
Similar to the Mario theme, this set received positive reviews. Many reviews praised the accuracy of the set to the original design. Other reviews also praise the interactivity with set, mainly with the crank and the console. Kevin Wong of IGN thoroughly enjoyed building the set, even with the long building time. He praised the set for its homages whilst staying faithful to the original design. Graham of Brick Fanatics felt that the NES set was far superior to the Mario theme, praising the functionality and appeal of the set to hardcore Nintendo and Lego fans.

=== Awards and nominations ===
In 2020, Adventures with Mario Starter Course (set number: 71360) was awarded "DreamToys" in the Licensed To Thrill category by the Toy Retailers Association.

In 2021, Lego Super Mario won the NPD Group's Global and European Toy Industry Performance Awards.

In February 2021, Character Packs was awarded "Toy of the Year" and also "Collectible of the Year" by the Toy Association. Bowser's Castle Boss Battle Expansion Set was awarded "Toy of the Year" and also "Playset of the Year" by the Toy Association.

In September 2022, Adventures with Peach (set number: 71403) was awarded "Toy of the Year" and also "Playset of the Year" by the Toy Association.

== See also ==
- Lego The Angry Birds Movie
- Lego Minecraft
- Lego Prince of Persia
- Lego Overwatch
- Lego Sonic the Hedgehog
- N&B Block
