= Lego Jack Stone =

Lego theme

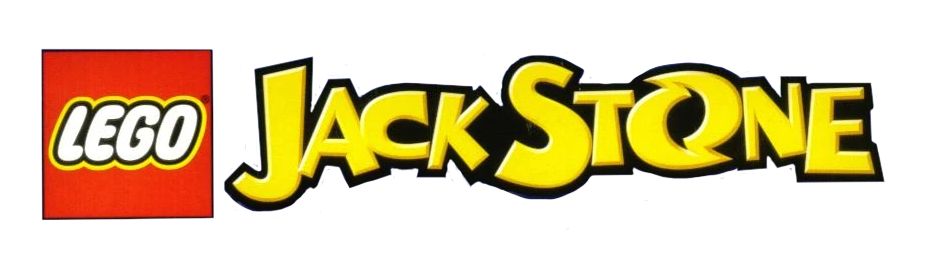
- Subject: City jobs
- Availability: 2001–2002
- Total sets: 25

Lego Jack Stone was a Lego theme that was introduced in 2001, designed for children aged 4+. It focused on Jack Stone, the main protagonist of the theme. It was eventually discontinued by the end of 2002 and replaced with the Lego 4+ theme in 2003.

== Overview ==
The Lego Jack Stone product line focused on Jack Stone who appears in various roles such as a policeman, fireman, worker, coast guard and pilot. Each of the sets featured a small number of larger pieces, in order to be easy to build. The minifigures measured 5cm (2 in) tall and were larger than regular minifigures but with no building required. The toy sets were marketed at children aged 4+. The main protagonist of the series is a hero of Lego City named Jack Stone.

== Launch ==
The Lego Jack Stone theme was launched at the International Toy Fair in New York in February 2001. As part of the marketing campaign, The Lego Group released 11 Lego Jack Stone sets. Each set featured various models, including Police HQ, Fire HQ, Rapid Response Tanker, AIR Operations HQ and minifigures, including Jack Stone.

== Construction sets ==
According to BrickLink, The Lego Group released a total of 25 Lego sets as part of Lego Jack Stone theme. It was discontinued by the end of 2002.

=== 2001 sets ===
The theme's first main sets was released in 2001. The theme included Jack Stone, police and firefighters.

- Police Cruiser (set number: 4600) was released in 2001. The set consists of 22 pieces with 1 minifigure. The set included Lego minifigure of Police.
- Fire Cruiser (set number: 4601) was released in 2001. The set consists of 21 pieces with 1 minifigure. The set included Lego minifigure of Fireman.
- Res-Q Wrecker (set number: 4603) was released in 2001. The set consists of 29 pieces with 1 minifigure. The set included Lego minifigure of Res-Q-Cap.
- Police Copter (set number: 4604) was released in 2001. The set consists of 14 pieces with 2 minifigures. The set included Lego minifigures of Jack Stone and Police.
- Fire Response SUV (set number: 4605) was released in 2001. The set consists of 28 pieces with 2 minifigures. The set included Lego minifigures of Jack Stone and Fireman.
- Aqua Res-Q Transport (set number: 4606) was released in 2001. The set consists of 38 pieces with 2 minifigures. The set included Lego minifigures of Jack Stone and Res-Q.
- Copter Transport (set number: 4607) was released in 2001. The set consists of 64 pieces with 2 minifigures. The set included Lego minifigures of Jack Stone and Res-Q.
- Bank Breakout (set number: 4608) was released in 2001. The set consists of 65 pieces with 3 minifigures. The set included Lego minifigures of Jack Stone, Police and Bank Robber.
- Fire Attack Team (set number: 4609) was released in 2001. The set consists of 90 pieces with 3 minifigures. The set included Lego minifigures of Jack Stone and 2 Firefighters.
- Aqua Res-Q Super Station (set number: 4610) was released in 2001. The set consists of 88 pieces with 4 minifigures. The set included Lego minifigures of Jack Stone, 2 Res-Q and Bank Robber.
- Police HQ (set number: 4611) was released in 2001. The set consists of 132 pieces with 5 minifigures. The set included Lego minifigures of Jack Stone, 3 Police and a Bank Robber.

=== 2002 sets ===
The 11 sets was released in 2002. The theme included Jack Stone, Crewman, Re-Q, Pilot and Firefighters.

- Super Glider (set number: 1435) was released in 2002 and exclusively in Japan only. The set consists of 7 pieces with 1 minifigure. The set included Lego minifigure of Jack Stone.
- Ultralight Flyer (set number: 1436) was released in 2002 and exclusively in Japan only. The set consists of 12 pieces with 1 minifigure. The set included Lego minifigure of Aviator.
- Turbo Chopper (set number: 1437) was released in 2002 and exclusively in Japan only. The set consists of 13 pieces with 1 minifigure. The set included Lego minifigure of Crewman.
- Super Glider (set number: 4612) was released in 2002. The set consists of 7 pieces with 1 minifigure. The set included Lego minifigure of Jack Stone.
- Turbo Chopper (set number: 4613) was released in 2002. The set consists of 13 pieces with 1 minifigure. The set included Lego minifigure of Crewman.
- Ultralight Flyer (set number: 4614) was released in 2002. The set consists of 12 pieces with 1 minifigure. The set included Lego minifigure of Aviator.
- Red Recon Flyer (set number: 4615) was released in 2002. The set consists of 20 pieces with 1 minifigure. The set included Lego minifigure of Aviator.
- Rapid Response Tanker (set number: 4616) was released in 2002. The set consists of 34 pieces with 1 minifigure. The set included Lego minifigure of Crewman.
- Dual Turbo Prop (set number: 4617) was released in 2002. The set consists of 28 pieces with 2 minifigures. The set included Lego minifigures of Jack Stone and Res-Q.
- Twin Rotor Cargo (set number: 4618) was released in 2002. The set consists of 41 pieces with 2 minifigures. The set included Lego minifigures of Jack Stone and Res-Q.
- AIR Patrol Jet (set number: 4619) was released in 2002. The set consists of 63 pieces with 2 minifigures. The set included Lego minifigures of Jack Stone and Airplane Pilot.
- AIR Operations HQ (set number: 4620) was released in 2002. The set consists of 170 pieces with 5 minifigures. The set included Lego minifigures of Jack Stone, Res-Q, 2 Crewmen and Airplane Pilot.
- Red Flash Station (set number: 4621) was released in 2002. The set consists of 32 pieces with 2 minifigures. The set included Lego minifigures of Jack Stone and Fireman.
- Res-Q Wrecker (set number: 4622) was released in 2002. The set consists of 65 pieces with 2 minifigures. The set included Lego minifigure of Jack Stone and Res-Q-Cap.

== See also ==
- Lego City
- Lego Pirates
- Lego Spider-Man
- Lego 4+
- Lego Juniors
