= Lego Racers (Lego theme) =

Lego theme

- Sub‑themes: Xalax (2001); Williams F1 (2002–2003); Drome Racers (2002–2004); Outdoor RC (2004, 2006); Ferrari (2004–2013); Power Racers (2005–2010); Tiny Turbos (2005–2011); Lamborghini (2009–2010)
- Subject: Racing
- Availability: 2001–2013
- Total sets: 254
- Official website

Lego Racers is a discontinued Lego product line with the first wave of sets being released in 2001. The range was first introduced in 2001 named after the Lego Racers video game series with the first wave of sets being based on the Xalax segment of Lego Racers 2. The earlier sets were designed more as racing car toys than construction toy, and included a launcher element (which doubled up as a storage container) that could be used to propel the vehicles. Over time the theme developed and became more in line with the style of other Lego products, while still encouraging a racing form of gameplay. The theme also included licensed models of real-life high-speed cars, such as a Lamborghini Gallardo and a Ferrari FXX. The product line was discontinued in 2013 after 12 years. A spiritual successor Lego Speed Champions was released in 2015, with a similar premise.

== Construction sets ==
According to BrickLink, The Lego Group released 254 playsets as part of the Lego Racers theme. The product line was eventually discontinued by the end of 2013.

Set Number	Set Name	Pieces	Theme - Subtheme	Year
1202-1	Single Racers Figure Pack	1	Racers - Xalax	2001
1239-1	Subzero	4	Racers - Xalax	2001
4297-1	Lightning Streak	20	Racers - Drome Racers	2002
4298-1	Blue Power	24	Racers - Drome Racers	2002
4299-1	Nesquik Rabbit Racer	18	Racers - Drome Racers	2002
4300-1	Green LEGO Car	21	Racers - Drome Racers	2003
4301-1	Blue LEGO Car	24	Racers - Drome Racers	2003
4308-1	Yellow Racer	28	Racers - Drome Racers	2004
4309-1	Blue Racer	31	Racers - Drome Racers	2004
4310-1	Orange Racer	24	Racers - Drome Racers	2004
4566-1	Gear	8	Racers - Xalax	2001
4567-1	Surfer	8	Racers - Xalax	2001
4568-1	Loopin	8	Racers - Xalax	2001
4569-1	Warrior	8	Racers - Xalax	2001
4570-1	Shredd	8	Racers - Xalax	2001
4571-1	Spiky	8	Racers - Xalax	2001
4572-1	Scratch	8	Racers - Xalax	2001
4573-1	Lightor	8	Racers - Xalax	2001
4574-1	Rip	8	Racers - Xalax	2001
4575-1	Pulse	8	Racers - Xalax	2001
4576-1	Duster	7	Racers - Xalax	2001
4577-1	Snake	8	Racers - Xalax	2001
4578-1	Ghost	8	Racers - Xalax	2001
4579-1	Freeze & Chill	114	Racers - Xalax	2001
4582-1	Red Bullet	29	Racers - Drome Racers	2002
4583-1	Maverick Storm	38	Racers - Drome Racers	2002
4584-1	Hot Scorcher	57	Racers - Drome Racers	2002
4585-1	Nitro Pulverizer	60	Racers - Drome Racers	2002
4586-1	Stunt Race Track	168	Racers - Drome Racers	2002
4587-1	Duel Racers	195	Racers - Drome Racers	2002
4588-1	Off-Road Race Track	359	Racers - Drome Racers	2002
4589-1	RC Nitro Flash	136	Racers - Drome Racers	2002
4590-1	Flash Turbo	26	Racers - Drome Racers	2002
4591-1	Star Strike	28	Racers - Drome Racers	2002
4592-1	Red Monster	25	Racers - Drome Racers	2002
4593-1	Zero Hurricane and Red Blizzard	70	Racers - Drome Racers	2002
4594-1	Maverick Sprinter & Hot Arrow	66	Racers - Drome Racers	2002
4595-1	Zero Tornado & Hot Rock	71	Racers - Drome Racers	2002
4596-1	Storming Cobra	89	Racers - Drome Racers	2002
4947-1	Yellow Sports Car	28	Racers - Tiny Turbos	2006
4948-1	Red Racer	22	Racers - Tiny Turbos	2006
4949-1	Blue Buggy	24	Racers - Tiny Turbos	2006
5599-1	Radio Control Racer	295	Racers	2001
5600-1	Radio Control Racer	298	Racers	1998
6111-1	Street Chase	198	Racers - Tiny Turbos	2006
7452-1	Le Mans	34	Racers - Tiny Turbos	2007
7453-1	Off Road	26	Racers - Tiny Turbos	2007
7611-1	Police Car	35	Racers - Tiny Turbos	2008
7612-1	Muscle Car	37	Racers - Tiny Turbos	2008
7613-1	Track Racer	34	Racers - Tiny Turbos	2008
7800-1	Off Road Racer	28	Racers - Tiny Turbos	2009
7801-1	Rally Racer	42	Racers - Tiny Turbos	2009
7802-1	Le Mans Racer	29	Racers - Tiny Turbos	2009
7967-1	Fast	69	Racers - Power Racers	2010
7968-1	Strong	91	Racers - Power Racers	2010
7970-1	Hero	68	Racers - Power Racers	2010
7971-1	Bad	72	Racers - Power Racers	2010
8119-1	Thunder Racer	48	Racers - Tiny Turbos	2009
8120-1	Rally Sprinter	47	Racers - Tiny Turbos	2009
8121-1	Track Marshall	48	Racers - Tiny Turbos	2009
8122-1	Desert Viper	41	Racers - Tiny Turbos	2009
8123-1	Ferrari F1 Racers	139	Racers - Tiny Turbos	2009
8124-1	Ice Rally	170	Racers - Tiny Turbos	2009
8125-1	Thunder Raceway	160	Racers - Tiny Turbos	2009
8126-1	Desert Challenge	144	Racers - Tiny Turbos	2009
8130-1	Terrain Crusher	44	Racers - Tiny Turbos	2007
8131-1	Raceway Rider	51	Racers - Tiny Turbos	2007
8132-1	Night Driver	41	Racers - Tiny Turbos	2007
8133-1	Rally Runner	51	Racers - Tiny Turbos	2007
8134-1	Night Crusher	265	Racers - Tiny Turbos	2007
8135-1	Bridge Chase	542	Racers - Tiny Turbos	2007
8136-1	Fire Crusher	65	Racers - Power Racers	2007
8137-1	Booster Beast	70	Racers - Power Racers	2007
8138-1	Phantom Crasher	85	Racers - Power Racers	2007
8139-1	Night Blazer	66	Racers - Power Racers	2007
8140-1	Tow Trasher	182	Racers - Power Racers	2007
8141-1	Off Road Power	201	Racers - Power Racers	2007
8142-1	Ferrari 248 F1 1:24	167	Racers - Ferrari	2007
8143-1	Ferrari F430 Challenge 1:17	690	Racers - Ferrari	2007
8144-1	Ferrari 248 F1 Team (Michael Schumacher Edition)	726	Racers - Ferrari	2007
8144-2	Ferrari F1 Team (Kimi Räikkönen Edition)	726	Racers - Ferrari	2007
8145-1	Ferrari 599 GTB Fiorano 1:10	1327	Racers - Ferrari	2007
8146-1	Nitro Muscle	598	Racers - Power Racers	2007
8147-1	Bullet Run	796	Racers - Tiny Turbos	2007
8148-1	EZ-Roadster	45	Racers - Tiny Turbos	2008
8149-1	Midnight Streak	43	Racers - Tiny Turbos	2008
8150-1	ZX Turbo	55	Racers - Tiny Turbos	2008
8151-1	Adrift Sport	52	Racers - Tiny Turbos	2008
8152-1	Speed Chasing	142	Racers - Tiny Turbos	2008
8153-1	Ferrari F1 Truck	270	Racers - Tiny Turbos	2008
8154-1	Brick Street Customs	1021	Racers - Tiny Turbos	2008
8155-1	Ferrari F1 Pit	482	Racers - Tiny Turbos	2008
8156-1	Ferrari FXX 1:17	626	Racers - Ferrari	2008
8157-1	Ferrari F1 1:9	997	Racers - Ferrari	2008
8158-1	Speed Racer & Snake Oiler	242	Racers - Speed Racer	2008
8159-1	Racer X & Taejo Togokhan	237	Racers - Speed Racer	2008
8160-1	Cruncher Block & Racer X	367	Racers - Speed Racer	2008
8161-1	Grand Prix Race	595	Racers - Speed Racer	2008
8162-1	Race Rig	104	Racers - Power Racers	2009
8163-1	Blue Sprinter	110	Racers - Power Racers	2009
8164-1	Extreme Wheelie	87	Racers - Power Racers	2009
8165-1	Monster Jumper	91	Racers - Power Racers	2009
8166-1	Wing Jumper	203	Racers - Power Racers	2009
8167-1	Jump Riders	209	Racers - Power Racers	2009
8168-1	Ferrari Victory	202	Racers - Ferrari	2009
8169-1	Lamborghini Gallardo LP 560-4	741	Racers - Lamborghini	2009
8182-1	Monster Crushers	388	Racers - Tiny Turbos	2009
8183-1	Track Turbo RC	92	Racers - Radio-Control	2009
8184-1	Twin X-treme RC	239	Racers - Radio-Control	2009
8185-1	Ferrari Truck	534	Racers - Ferrari	2009
8186-1	Street Extreme	757	Racers - Tiny Turbos	2009
8192-1	Lime Racer	44	Racers - Tiny Turbos	2010
8193-1	Blue Bullet	50	Racers - Tiny Turbos	2010
8194-1	Nitro Muscle	47	Racers - Tiny Turbos	2010
8195-1	Turbo Tow	43	Racers - Tiny Turbos	2010
8196-1	Chopper Jump	141	Racers - Tiny Turbos	2010
8197-1	Highway Chaos	142	Racers - Tiny Turbos	2010
8198-1	Ramp Crash	145	Racers - Tiny Turbos	2010
8199-1	Security Smash	135	Racers - Tiny Turbos	2010
8211-1	Brick Street Getaway	552	Racers - Tiny Turbos	2010
8214-1	Lamborghini Polizia	801	Racers - Lamborghini	2010
8221-1	Storming Enforcer	97	Racers	2011
8227-1	Dragon Dueler	94	Racers	2011
8228-1	Sting Striker	82	Racers	2011
8231-1	Vicious Viper	96	Racers	2011
8301-1	Urban Enforcer	45	Racers - Tiny Turbos	2011
8302-1	Rod Rider	48	Racers - Tiny Turbos	2011
8303-1	Demon Destroyer	51	Racers - Tiny Turbos	2011
8304-1	Smokin' Slickster	44	Racers - Tiny Turbos	2011
8350-1	Pro Stunt	30	Racers - Drome Racers	2003
8353-1	Slammer Rhino	220	Racers - Drome Racers	2003
8354-1	Exo Force Bike	101	Racers - Drome Racers	2003
8355-1	H.O.T. Blaster Bike	88	Racers - Drome Racers	2003
8356-1	Jungle Monster	116	Racers - Drome Racers	2003
8357-1	Zonic Strike	107	Racers - Drome Racers	2003
8358-1	Off-Roader	26	Racers - Drome Racers	2003
8359-1	Desert Racer	27	Racers - Drome Racers	2003
8360-1	Track Racer	24	Racers - Drome Racers	2003
8362-1	Ferrari F1 Racer	113	Racers - Ferrari	2004
8363-1	Baja Desert Racers	322	Racers - Drome Racers	2003
8364-1	Multi-Challenge Race Track	623	Racers - Drome Racers	2003
8365-1	Tuneable Racer	196	Racers - Drome Racers	2003
8366-1	Supersonic RC	429	Racers - Drome Racers	2003
8369-1	Dirt Crusher RC	88	Racers - Outdoor RC	2004
8369-2	Dirt Crusher RC	88	Racers - Outdoor RC	2006
8370-1	Nitro Stunt Bike	92	Racers - Drome Racers	2003
8371-1	Extreme Power Bike	98	Racers - Drome Racers	2003
8374-1	Williams F1 Team Racer	98	Racers - Williams F1	2003
8375-1	Ferrari F1 Pit Set	242	Racers - Ferrari	2004
8376-1	Hot Flame RC Car	257	Racers - Drome Racers	2003
8378-1	Red Beast RC	65	Racers - Drome Racers	2004
8380-1	Red Maniac	83	Racers - Drome Racers	2004
8381-1	Exo Raider	94	Racers - Drome Racers	2004
8382-1	Hot Buster	67	Racers - Drome Racers	2004
8383-1	Nitro Terminator	70	Racers - Drome Racers	2004
8384-1	Jungle Crasher	76	Racers - Drome Racers	2004
8385-1	Exo Stealth	81	Racers - Drome Racers	2004
8386-1	Ferrari F1 Racer 1:10	738	Racers - Ferrari	2004
8389-1	M. Schumacher and R. Barrichello	34	Racers - Ferrari	2004
8461-1	Williams F1 Team Racer	1484	Racers - Williams F1	2002
8468-1	Power Crusher	92	Racers - Drome Racers	2002
8469-1	Slammer Raptor	144	Racers - Drome Racers	2002
8470-1	Slammer G-Force	148	Racers - Drome Racers	2002
8471-1	Nitro Burner	119	Racers - Drome Racers	2002
8472-1	Street 'n' Mud Racer	347	Racers - Drome Racers	2002
8473-1	Nitro Race Team	500	Racers - Drome Racers	2002
8475-1	RC Race Buggy	283	Racers - Drome Racers	2002
8490-1	Desert Hopper	92	Racers - Power Racers	2008
8491-1	Ram Rod	72	Racers - Power Racers	2008
8492-1	Mud Hopper	59	Racers - Power Racers	2008
8493-1	Red Ace	82	Racers - Power Racers	2008
8494-1	Ring of Fire	268	Racers - Power Racers	2008
8495-1	Crosstown Craze	503	Racers - Tiny Turbos	2008
8496-1	Desert Hammer	510	Racers - Power Racers	2008
8641-1	Flame Glider	52	Racers - Tiny Turbos	2005
8642-1	Monster Crusher	43	Racers - Tiny Turbos	2005
8643-1	Power Cruiser	46	Racers - Tiny Turbos	2005
8644-1	Street Maniac	36	Racers - Tiny Turbos	2005
8645-1	Muscle Slammer Bike	126	Racers - Power Racers	2005
8646-1	Speed Slammer Bike	126	Racers - Power Racers	2005
8647-1	Night Racer	76	Racers - Power Racers	2005
8648-1	Buzz Saw	64	Racers - Power Racers	2005
8649-1	Nitro Menace	622	Racers - Power Racers	2005
8650-1	Furious Slammer Racer	254	Racers - Power Racers	2005
8651-1	Jumping Giant	242	Racers - Power Racers	2005
8652-1	Enzo Ferrari 1:17	477	Racers - Ferrari	2005
8653-1	Enzo Ferrari 1:10	1360	Racers - Ferrari	2005
8654-1	Scuderia Ferrari Truck	813	Racers - Ferrari	2005
8655-1	RX-Sprinter	58	Racers - Tiny Turbos	2005
8656-1	F6 Truck	47	Racers - Tiny Turbos	2005
8657-1	ATR 4	39	Racers - Tiny Turbos	2005
8658-1	Big Bling Wheelie	32	Racers - Tiny Turbos	2005
8661-1	Carbon Star	44	Racers - Tiny Turbos	2006
8662-1	Blue Renegade	49	Racers - Tiny Turbos	2006
8663-1	Fat Trax	42	Racers - Tiny Turbos	2006
8664-1	Road Hero	55	Racers - Tiny Turbos	2006
8665-1	Highway Enforcer	52	Racers - Tiny Turbos	2006
8666-1	Tuner X	61	Racers - Tiny Turbos	2006
8667-1	Action Wheeler	79	Racers - Power Racers	2006
8668-1	Side Rider 55	111	Racers - Power Racers	2006
8669-1	Fire Spinner 360	113	Racers - Power Racers	2006
8670-1	Jump Master	105	Racers - Power Racers	2006
8671-1	Ferrari 430 Spider 1:17	559	Racers - Ferrari	2006
8672-1	Ferrari Finish Line	573	Racers - Ferrari	2006
8673-1	Ferrari F1 Fuel Stop	189	Racers - Ferrari	2006
8674-1	Ferrari F1 Racer 1:8	1246	Racers - Ferrari	2006
8675-1	Outdoor Challenger	104	Racers - Outdoor RC	2006
8676-1	Sunset Cruiser	58	Racers - Outdoor RC	2006
8681-1	Tuner Garage	652	Racers - Tiny Turbos	2006
8682-1	Nitro Intimidator	724	Racers - Power Racers	2006
9092-1	Crazy Demon	86	Racers	2012
9093-1	Bone Cruncher	87	Racers	2012
9094-1	Star Striker	88	Racers	2012
9095-1	Nitro Predator	87	Racers	2012
30030-1	Rally Raider	31	Racers - Tiny Turbos	2010
30033-1	Truck	45	Racers - Tiny Turbos	2010
30034-1	Tow Truck	39	Racers - Tiny Turbos	2010
30035-1	Off-Road Racer 2	33	Racers - Tiny Turbos	2010
30036-1	Buggy Racer	26	Racers - Tiny Turbos	2011
30190-1	Ferrari 150 Italia	33	Racers - Ferrari	2012
30191-1	Scuderia Ferrari Truck	41	Racers - Ferrari	2012
30192-1	F40	48	Racers - Ferrari	2012
30193-1	250 GT Berlinetta	25	Racers - Ferrari	2012
30194-1	458 Italia	33	Racers - Ferrari	2012
30195-1	FXX	51	Racers - Ferrari	2012
30196-1	Shell F1 Team	47	Racers - Ferrari	2012
40200-1	BMW	30	Racers	2013
65062-1	Racers Turbo Pack	86	Racers - Product Collection	2002
65417-1	Bonus/Value Pack	151	Racers - Product Collection	2004
65456-1	Bonus/Value Pack	306	Racers - Product Collection	2003
65546-1	Bonus/Value Pack	310	Racers - Product Collection	2004
65573-1	Rumble Racers	310	Racers - Product Collection	2005
65706-1	Bonus/Value Pack	348	Racers - Product Collection	2005
65826-1	Bonus/Value Pack	380	Racers - Product Collection	2005
66288-1	Bonus/Value Pack	143	Racers - Product Collection	2008
850606-1	Hazard Kit	35	Racers - Radio-Control	2004
4285968-1	Dirt Crusher Transformation Kit	48	Racers - Radio-Control	2005
4285969-1	Dirt Crusher Transformation Kit	48	Racers - Radio-Control	2005
4285970-1	Dirt Crusher Transformation Kit	48	Racers - Radio-Control	2005
4286013-1	Dirt Crusher Big Wheels Pack	10	Racers - Radio-Control	2005
4286024-1	Dirt Crusher Big Wheels Pack	10	Racers - Radio-Control	2005
4286025-1	Dirt Crusher Big Wheels Pack	10	Racers - Radio-Control	2005
4286784-1	Dirt Crusher Gearbox with Light	6	Racers - Radio-Control	2005
4287082-1	Dirt Crusher Antenna Pack	10	Racers - Radio-Control	2005
670F-1	Wheels Pack	10	Racers - Radio-Control	2004
671F-1	Antenna Pack	13	Racers - Radio-Control	2004
673F-1	Gearbox Pack	6	Racers - Radio-Control	2004
BAT8369-1	Battery Pack	6	Racers - Radio-Control	2004

== Video games ==
=== Lego Racers (video game) ===
Lego Racers is a Lego-themed racing video game developed by High Voltage Software and published by Lego Media.

=== Lego Racers 2 ===
Lego Racers 2 is a Lego-themed racing video game developed by Attention to Detail, published by Lego Software and distributed in North America by Electronic Arts. It was first released in September 2001 for Microsoft Windows, PlayStation 2 and Game Boy Advance. It is the sequel to the 1999 game Lego Racers. This sequel was first revealed by Lego Software on August 20, 2001.

== See also ==
- Lego City
- Lego Fusion
- Lego Speed Champions - The spiritual successor to Lego Racers.
- Lego Speed Racer
- Lego World Racers - A Lego theme with a racing premise.
- Lego Cars
