= Lego Toy Story =

Lego theme

- Subject: Toy Story
- Licensed from: Walt Disney Pictures and Pixar
- Availability: 2009–2011, 2019–2021
- Total sets: 24+
- Characters: Woody, Buzz Lightyear, Rex, Hamm, Jessie, Bullseye, Green Alien Men, RC, Green Army Men, Stinky Pete, Zurg, Lotso, Chunk, Stretch, Twitch, Dump truck driver, Bo Peep, Forky, Bunny, Ducky, Gabby Gabby, Duke Caboom
- Official website

Lego Toy Story is a discontinued Lego theme based on the Disney·Pixar's Toy Story film franchise. The first four sets were released on December 30, 2009, with an additional two sets being released on January 4, 2010. In May 2010, five Lego and four Duplo sets were released under the Toy Story 3 sub-theme. The original theme was discontinued in 2011. For the release of Toy Story 4 there was one Duplo set based on the third film and 6 Lego sets based on the fourth film. These sets were released in March and in April 2019 this time under the Juniors line. The minifigures in the sets were also now redesigned. The revival theme was discontinued in 2021.

== Overview ==
Lego Toy Story was based on the Disney·Pixar's Toy Story film franchise. The product line focuses on the anthropomorphic concept that all toys, unknown to humans, are secretly alive and the films focus on a diverse group of toys that feature a classic cowboy doll named Sheriff Woody and a modern spaceman action figure named Buzz Lightyear. The group unexpectedly embark on adventures that challenge and change them. Lego Toy Story aimed to recreate the main characters in Lego form, including Woody, Buzz Lightyear, Rex, Hamm, Jessie, Bullseye, Green Alien Men, RC, Green Army Men, Bo Peep, Duke Caboom and Forky.

== Development ==
Lego Toy Story was inspired by Toy Story film franchise. The Lego construction toy range was based on the animated film franchise and developed in collaboration with Disney Consumer Products. The construction sets were designed to recreate the story and characters of the animated film series in Lego form.

== Launch ==
Lego Toy Story theme was launched at the American International Toy Fair in June 2010. As part of the marketing campaign, The Lego Group released eleven Lego sets based on the Toy Story film franchise. Each set featured different buildable characters, vehicles, buildings and spacecraft.

== Characters ==
- Woody: A pull-string cowboy doll who is Andy's favorite toy.
- Buzz Lightyear: A space ranger action figure and Woody's rival, who later becomes his best friend.
- Rex: A nervous green Tyrannosaurus figurine.
- Hamm: A smart-talking piggy bank.
- Bo Peep: A porcelain shepherdess doll and Woody's love interest.
- Jessie: A cowgirl doll.
- Ducky: A stuffed duck and a carnival prize and Bunny's friend.
- Bunny: A stuffed rabbit and a carnival prize and Ducky's friend.
- Forky: A plastic spork made by Bonnie who hates coming to life.

== Toyline ==
According to BrickLink, The Lego Group released a total of 22 Lego sets and promotional polybags as part of the Lego Toy Story theme. The original product line was discontinued in 2011 and the revived line was discontinued in 2021, but was revived in 2022 for the release of Lightyear.

=== Construction sets ===
The first Toy Story sets were released on December 30, 2009. Army Men on Patrol (set number: 7595) is a 90-piece set. The sets features include an 8 cm (3") jeep, a stretcher and four minifigures. The minifigures include three plain army men and a medic. Buzz's Star Command Spaceship (set number: 7593) is a 257-piece set. The set features include a Star Command spaceship which is 18 cm (7") tall, a moon buggy, an Emperor Zurg minifigure and a Buzz Lightyear minifigure. This set is based on the spin-off TV series Buzz Lightyear of Star Command. Woody and Buzz to the Rescue (set number: 7590) is a 92-piece set. Its features include RC the car with a pull-back motor, a Woody minifigure, and a Buzz Lightyear minifigure attached to a rocket. The car measures 13 cm (5") long. Woody's Roundup! (set number: 7594) was the fourth set to be released in December. It is a 502-piece set, its features include the sheriffs building, a jail, a mine, and four minifigures. It is 28 cm (11") long, 20 cm (8") tall and over 10 cm (4") wide. The four minifigures include Woody, Jessie, Bullseye and Stinky Pete. This set is based on the show-within-a-show Woody's Roundup. All of these sets have a recommended age range of 6–12, except Buzz's Star Command Spaceship (set number: 7593), which has an age range of 7–14.

Five days later an additional two sets were released with an age rating of 7–14. Both sets had only an alien for the minifigures. Construct-a-Buzz (set number: 7592) is a 205-piece set. The set features include a buildable Buzz Lightyear that is 18 cm (7") tall with a retractable helmet and moveable wings, Buzz's laser cannon and a Squeeze Toy Alien minifigure. Construct-a-Zurg (set number: 7591) is a 118-piece set. The set features include a buildable Emperor Zurg that is 23 cm (9") tall with a rotating waist, a sphere-shooting cannon, and a Squeeze Toy Alien minifigure.

On May 4, 2010, five sets were released in the United States based on the events of Toy Story 3. Four days later the sets were released in the United Kingdom. Trash Compactor Escape (set number: 7596) is a 370-piece set with an age rating of 7–12. The set features include a crane claw, a dumpster, a 40 cm (16") conveyor belt and five minifigures. The minifigures include Lotso, Hamm, Woody and two squeeze toy aliens with different markings on their face, the same markings on their body, and no markings on their legs. Western Train Chase (set number: 7597) is a 584-piece set with an age rating of 7–14. The set features include a locomotive, three train cars and six minifigures. The minifigures include Buzz, Woody, Jessie, Bullseye, Rex, and Hamm as Evil Doctor Porkchop. Pizza Planet Truck Rescue (set number: 7598) is a 225-piece set with an age rating of 6–12 and is based on the fictional Pizza Planet restaurant. The set features a 20 cm (4") pizza truck and four minifigures – Buzz, Rex, Hamm and a squeeze toy alien. Lotso's Dump Truck (set number: 7789) is a 129-piece set which also has an age range of 6–12. The set features include a 14 cm (5.5") dump truck and three minifigures – Lotso, Chunk and Stretch. The dump truck driver is not a minifigure. Garbage Truck Getaway (set number: 7599) is a 402-piece set with an age rating of 7–14. The set features 22 cm (8.5") dumpster and four minifigures. The minifigures include Buzz, Jessie, Twitch and Lotso. Twitch is an exclusive to Garbage Truck Getaway.

A promotional set, Alien Space Ship (set number: 30070), was released across Europe. In the United Kingdom it was made redeemable at Tesco stores, along with a Lego Toy Story Keychains, or a minifigure magnet set. Two additional promotional sets were released through the United Kingdom's Daily Mirror. Woody's Camp Out (set number: 30072) was released along with the newspaper on July 17 and Buzz's Mini Ship (set number: 30073) was released with the paper on July 18. An Army Jeep (set number: 30071) set branded under the Toy Story 3 logo has also been released in 2010. The original sets were discontinued in 2011.

In 2019, the 6 sets based on the Toy Story 4 film was released on 22 April 2019 and unveiled at the 2019 New York Toy Fair. The six sets were Woody & RC (set number: 10766), Carnival Thrill Coaster (set number: 10771), Duke Caboom's Stunt Show (set number: 10767), Buzz and Bo Peep's Playground Adventure (set number: 10768), RV Vacation (set number: 10769) and 10770 Buzz & Woody's Carnival Mania! (set number: 10770). The revived sets were discontinued in 2021.

=== Duplo sets ===
A Duplo sub-theme was released at the same time in May as the Toy Story 3 sets. All of the sets have an age recommendation of 2–5 and are branded under the Toy Story 3 logo. Jessie's Round-Up is an 18-piece set which features a sheriff's wall, a Bullseye minifigure and a Jessie minifigure. Pizza Planet Truck is a 13-piece set. Its features include a Dinoco fuel sign and pump, a 12 cm (5") Pizza Planet truck, a Squeeze Toy Alien and a Buzz minifigure. The Great Train Chase is a 39-piece set. Its features include a 20 cm (8") locomotive and caboose, an archway, and three minifigures. The minifigures include Jessie, Buzz and Woody. Alien Space Crane is a 23-piece set. Its features include a crane with a shovel, a garbage truck and three minifigures – Buzz, Woody, and a Squeeze Toy Alien. Toy Story Train (set number: 10894) was released on 19 June 2019.

=== Lego BrickHeadz sets ===
In December 2021, The Lego Group had revealed the two sets of Lego BrickHeadz were Buzz Lightyear (set number: 40552) and Woody and Bo Peep (set number: 40553) was released in February 2022 and based on the Toy Story film franchise. Buzz Lightyear (set number: 40552) consists of 114 pieces with a baseplate and Woody & Bo Peep (set number: 40553) consists of 296 pieces with 2 baseplates.

== Web shorts ==
The product line was accompanied by a series of animated short films that was released on YouTube.

=== Toy Story 4 - Forky's Rescue - As Told With LEGO Bricks (2019 Short) ===
Toy Story 4 - Forky's Rescue - As Told With LEGO Bricks released a short film via YouTube, on 21 June 2019, that is inspired by both the Toy Story 4 animated series as well as the Lego toyline. The film tells the story of Buzz Lightyear, Woody and Forky.

== Other media ==
=== Lego Ideas ===
A project based on "Andy's Room" was uploaded to the Lego Ideas site on September 4, 2016. The project hoped to reach 10,000 supporters in order for Lego to consider to make it into an official set. The project is based on Andy's bedroom from the original Toy Story film and includes characters such as Buzz Lightyear, Sheriff Woody, Rex, Hamm, a custom Mr. Potato Head minifigure and RC. But in 2018, the project expired.

== Video game ==
=== Lego The Incredibles ===
A crossover Lego-themed action-adventure video game named Lego The Incredibles was developed by TT Fusion. Lego The Incredibles was released by Warner Bros. Interactive Entertainment on 15 June 2018 in North America and on 13 July 2018 in Europe. A macOS version of the game was released by Feral Interactive on 21 November 2018. It includes Woody as a secret playable character.

== Reception ==
In 2011, The Lego Group reported that due to the Lego Toy Story, Prince of Persia, Pirates of the Caribbean and Cars 2 lines, it had for the first time in its 50-year history in the American market surpassed $1.0 billion in consumer sales of Lego products, reaching its highest share of construction toys and total U.S. toy market ever.

In 2018, Woody's Roundup (set number: 7594) was listed as one of the "Top 10 Western LEGO Sets" by Lego fansite BricksFanz.

== Awards and nominations ==
In 2010, The Great Train Chase (set number: 5659) was awarded "DreamToys" in the Pre-School category by the Toy Retailers Association. Woody & Buzz to the Rescue (set number: 7590) was awarded "DreamToys" in the Creative Play category by the Toy Retailers Association.

== See also ==
- Lego Avatar
- Lego The Simpsons
- Toy Story (franchise)
- Lego Cars
- Lego Prince of Persia
- Lego Pirates of the Caribbean
- Lego The Lone Ranger
- Lego Disney
- Lego BrickHeadz
