= Lego 4+ =

Lego theme

- Other names: Lego 4 Juniors
- Sub‑themes: City, Pirates and Spider-Man
- Subject: Children 4 years old or more
- Availability: July 1, 2003–December 31, 2005
- Total sets: 22
- Characters: Jack Stone, Fireman, Truck Driver, Tractor Driver, Captain Redbeard, Captain Kragg, Jolly Jack Crow, Harry Hardtack, Scurvy Dog, Cannonball Jimmy, Harry Hardtack, Drake Dagger, Jolly Jack Crow, Spider-Man, Peter Parker, Doc Ock and Police Officer

Lego 4+ also known as Lego 4 Juniors is a discontinued Lego theme that was first introduced on July 1, 2003, designed for children aged 4+. It is the successor of the Lego Jack Stone theme released in 2001. The 4+ theme consisted of Pirates, City and Spider-Man sub-themes. It was eventually discontinued by December 31, 2005.

== Overview ==
Each of the sets featured a small number of larger pieces, in order to be easy to build. The minifigures measured 10 cm (2 in) tall and were larger than regular minifigures but with no building required. The toy sets were marketed at children aged 4+.

== Characters ==
- Jack Stone: A hero of Lego City who previously appeared in Lego Jack Stone theme.
- Captain Redbeard: The brother of Captain Kragg who search for the buried treasure.
- Captain Kragg: The brother of Captain Redbeard and the main antagonist of the Pirates sub-theme.
- Scurvy Dog: Captain Kragg's crew.
- Cannonball Jimmy: The friends of Harry Hardtack and Jolly Jack Crow.
- Harry Hardtack: Captain Redbeard's pirate crew and cook.
- Drake Dagger: Captain Kragg's pirate crew.
- Jolly Jack Crow: Captain Redbeard's pirate gang.
- Peter Parker / Spider-Man: A superhero, Columbia University physics student, and photographer for the Daily Bugle. Juggling these separate lives means he briefly gives up his responsibilities as a superhero in a moment of adversity.
- Dr. Otto Octavius / Doctor Octopus: A scientist working on behalf of Oscorp and Peter's role model and mentor who goes insane after his failure to create a self-sustaining fusion reaction, which also resulted in the death of his wife, Rosie. Octavius is bonded with his handling equipment, four artificially intelligent mechanical tentacles, which influence his mentality and convince him that he must finish his experiment at all costs.

== Construction sets ==
According to BrickLink, The Lego Group released a total of 56 Lego sets as part of Lego 4+ theme. It was discontinued by December 31, 2005.

=== City sets ===
The City sub-theme was a direct sequel of the Lego Jack Stone theme, however Jack Stone only appeared in Quick Fix Station (set number: 4655) and Fire Squad HQ (set number: 4657). The City sub-theme consisted of 10 sets was released in July 2003. Also included Construction, Police and Firefighters. The 10 sets being released were Police Motorcycle (set number: 4651), Tow Truck (set number: 4652), Dump Truck (set number: 4653), Tanker Truck (set number: 4654), Quick Fix Station (set number: 4655), Fire Squad HQ (set number: 4657), Speedy Police Car (set number: 4666), Loadin' Digger (set number: 4667), Outrigger Construction Crane (set number: 4668) and Turbo-Charged Police Boat (set number: 4669).

- Police Motorcycle (set number: 4651) was released on 1 July 2003. The set consists of 11 pieces with 1 minifigure. The set included Lego minifigure of Police Officer.
- Tow Truck (set number: 4652) was released on 1 July 2003. The set consists of 26 pieces with 1 minifigure. The set included Lego minifigure of Truck Driver.
- Dump Truck (set number: 4653) was released on 1 July 2003. The set consists of 28 pieces with 1 minifigure. The set included Lego minifigure of Construction Worker.
- Tanker Truck (set number: 4654) was released on 1 July 2003. The set consists of 42 pieces with 1 minifigure. The set included Lego minifigure of Truck Driver.
- Quick Fix Station (set number: 4655) was released on 1 July 2003. The set consists of 101 pieces with 2 minifigures. The set included Lego minifigures of Gas Station Attendant and Jack Stone.
- Fire Squad HQ (set number: 4657) was released on 1 July 2003. The set consists of 139 pieces with 3 minifigures. The set included Lego minifigures of 2 Firefighters and Jack Stone.
- Speedy Police Car (set number: 4666) was released on 1 January 2004. The set consists of 24 pieces with 1 minifigure. The set included Lego minifigure of Police Officer.
- Loadin' Digger (set number: 4667) was released on 1 January 2004. The set consists of 30 pieces with 1 minifigure. The set included Lego minifigure of Tractor Driver.
- Outrigger Construction Crane (set number: 4668) was released on 1 January 2004. The set consists of 61 pieces with 2 minifigures. The set included Lego minifigures of Construction Worker and Crewman.
- Turbo-Charged Police Boat (set number: 4669) was released on 1 January 2004. The set consists of 55 pieces with 2 minifigures. The set included Lego minifigures of 2 Police Officers.

=== Spider-Man sets ===
The Spider-Man sub-theme contained only 2 sets was released in May 2004 and based on Spider-Man 2 film, that was a larger piece version of the original Spider-Man 2 theme. It was also the only movie theme for the 4+ theme. The 2 sets being released were Doc Ock's Crime Spree (set number: 4858) and Doc Ock's Cafe Attack (set number: 4860).

- Doc Ock's Crime Spree (set number: 4858) was released on 1 May 2004. The set consists of 55 pieces with 3 minifigures. The set included Lego minifigures of Spider-Man, Doc Ock and Police Officer.
- Doc Ock's Cafe Attack (set number: 4860) was released on 1 May 2004. The set consists of 130 pieces with 3 minifigures. The set included Lego minifigures of Spider-Man, Doc Ock and Peter Parker.

=== Pirates sets ===
The Pirates sub-theme contained 10 sets that was released in June 2004 and based on the story about Captain Kragg and his brother Captain Redbeard in a race for an island's treasure. This Pirates sub-theme introduced a number of minion pirates are Scurvy Dog, Cannonball Jimmy, Harry Hardtack, Drake Dagger and Jolly Jack Crow. The 10 sets being released were Catapult Raft (set number: 7070), Treasure Island (set number: 7071), Captain Kragg's Pirate Boat (set number: 7072), Pirate Dock (set number: 7073), Skull Island (set number: 7074), Captain Redbeard's Pirate Ship (set number: 7075), Scurvy Dog and Crocodile (set number: 7080), Harry Hardtack and Monkey (set number: 7081), Cannonball Jimmy and Shark (set number: 7082) and Captain Kragg in Barrel (set number: 7290).

- Catapult Raft (set number: 7070) was released on 1 June 2004. The set consists of 22 pieces with 1 minifigure. The set included Lego minifigures of Jolly Jack Crow.
- Treasure Island (set number: 7071) was released on 1 June 2004. The set consists of 24 pieces with 2 minifigures. The set included Lego minifigures of Harry Hardtack and Drake Dagger.
- Captain Kragg's Pirate Boat (set number: 7072) was released on 1 June 2004. The set consists of 36 pieces with 1 minifigure. The set included Lego minifigure of Captain Kragg.
- Pirate Dock (set number: 7073) was released on 1 June 2004. The set consists of 61 pieces with 2 minifigures. The set included Lego minifigures of Captain Redbeard and Drake Dagger.
- Skull Island (set number: 7074) was released on 1 June 2004. The set consists of 76 pieces with 3 minifigures. The set included Lego minifigures of Spider-Man, Doc Ock and Police Officer.
- Captain Redbeard's Pirate Ship (set number: 7075) was released on 1 June 2004. The set consists of 131 pieces with 4 minifigures. The set included Lego minifigures of Scurvy Dog, Harry Hardtack, Jolly Jack Crow and Captain Redbeard.
- Scurvy Dog and Crocodile (set number: 7080) was released on 1 June 2004. The set consists of 4 pieces with 1 minifigure. The set included Lego minifigure of Scurvy Dog.
- Harry Hardtack and Monkey (set number: 7081) was released on 1 June 2004. The set consists of 9 pieces with 1 minifigure. The set included Lego minifigure of Harry Hardtack.
- Cannonball Jimmy and Shark (set number: 7082) was released on 1 June 2004. The set consists of 4 pieces with 1 minifigure. The set included Lego minifigure of Cannonball Jimmy.
- Captain Kragg in Barrel (set number: 7290) was released on 1 June 2004. The set consists of 4 pieces with 1 minifigure. The set included Lego minifigure of Captain Kragg.

== See also ==
- Lego City
- Lego Pirates
- Lego Spider-Man
- Lego Jack Stone
- Lego Juniors
