= Lego Pirates of the Caribbean =

Lego theme

- Subject: Pirates of the Caribbean
- Licensed from: Walt Disney Pictures and Jerry Bruckheimer Films
- Availability: 2011–2017; 2025 - Present
- Total sets: 19
- Characters: Angelica, Captain Armando Salazar, Blackbeard, "Bootstrap Bill" Turner, Cannibal, Carina Smyth, Chef, Davy Jones, Elizabeth Swann, Hadras, Barbossa, King George's General, King George's Soldier, Henry Turner, Horse Coach Driver, Jack Sparrow, Norrington, Joshamee Gibbs, Lt. Lesaro, Officer Magda, Maccus, Philip Swift, Quartermaster, Officer Santos, Scrum, Silent Mary Masthead, Syrena, Tamara, Lieutenant Theodore Grove, Will Turner, Yeoman Zombie and Gunner Zombie
- Official website

Lego Pirates of the Caribbean is a Lego theme that is based on the film series of the same name. It is licensed from Walt Disney Pictures and Jerry Bruckheimer Films. There are nine known sets. The first wave was released in May 2011 with the second wave coming out in November 2011. In November 2010, it was officially announced by Lego that the video game Lego Pirates of the Caribbean: The Video Game was in production. It was released on May 10, 2011, in North America. The series acts as a thematic replacement for the popular Lego Pirates theme, featuring many of the same elements. Most of the sets are similar to the Lego Pirates theme. The theme was first introduced in 2011 and was first discontinued in 2017 before returning with two new sets in 2025.

== Overview ==
Lego Pirates of the Caribbean is based on the film. The product line focuses on the Jack Sparrow and Will Turner as they rescue the kidnapped Elizabeth Swann from the cursed crew of the Black Pearl, captained by Hector Barbossa, who become undead skeletons at night. Lego Pirates of the Caribbean aimed to recreate the main characters in Lego form, including Jack Sparrow, Will Turner and Elizabeth Swann.

In addition, the film's Academy Award-winning production designer John Myhre was also on hand as guests were treated to the reveal of a life-sized figure of Captain Jack Sparrow standing a full six feet tall and made of 150,000 Lego bricks.

== Development ==
Before the launch of the Lego Pirates of the Caribbean range, The Lego Pirates theme was released in 1989. This theme featured pirates, soldiers from the Napoleonic Wars, Pacific Islanders, sailing ships, and buried treasure, being influenced by the late Golden Age of Piracy. These themes eventually resulted in the introduction of the Lego Pirates of the Caribbean theme, which included some of the original concepts of the Lego Pirates theme, such as pirates and soldiers, but also introduced 17th century elements.

Lego Pirates of the Caribbean was inspired by the film series Pirates of the Caribbean. The Lego construction toy range was based on the film series and developed in collaboration with Disney Consumer Products. The construction sets were designed to recreate the story and characters of the film series in Lego form. Jill Wilfert, Vice President of licensing and entertainment stated, "The pirate theme is always a strong player in the Lego portfolio, and the Pirates of the Caribbean brand offers the quintessential pirate experience with familiar characters, stories and scenes, allowing us to develop even more authentic and exciting models for children and collectors."

== Launch ==
Lego Pirates of the Caribbean was launched at the American International Toy Fair in 2011. As part of the marketing campaign, The Lego Group released eight Lego sets based on the Pirates of the Caribbean film. Each set featured different mill, pirate ship, fountain of youth and Whitecap Bay.

== Characters ==
- Jack Sparrow: An eccentric pirate characterized by his slightly drunken swagger, slurred speech and awkwardly flailing hand gestures. He has gained a reputation with made-up stories of how he escaped from the deserted island he was put on. He is determined to regain the Black Pearl, which he captained ten years before.
- Barbossa: The captain of the Black Pearl, he was Captain Jack Sparrow's first mate before he led a mutiny ten years before. He and his crew stole cursed Aztec gold, for which they are cursed to walk the earth forever.
- Will Turner: A blacksmith's apprentice working in Port Royal, he is in love with Elizabeth Swann. Will struggles with the fact his father, "Bootstrap" Bill, was a pirate, unable to reconcile that he was a good man too.
- Elizabeth Swann: The daughter of Governor Weatherby Swann, Elizabeth has been fascinated with pirates since childhood. She is the main protagonist of the film. During the Black Pearl's attack on Port Royal, she gives her name as Turner and is mistaken for "Bootstrap" Bill's child. She also is in love with Will Turner.
- Norrington: An officer in the Royal Navy who is in love with Elizabeth and has a deep-seated dislike for pirates.
- Joshamee Gibbs: Jack Sparrow's friend and first mate, he was once a sailor for the Royal Navy. He is usually the one who tells the legends of Jack Sparrow.
- "Bootstrap Bill" Turner: A crewman aboard the Flying Dutchman who so happens to be Will Turner's father. He was cursed by the Aztec gold on Isla de Muerta (along with Hector Barbossa's crew). Thrown overboard after refusing to take part in the mutiny against Jack led by Barbossa, he spent years bound to a cannon beneath the crushing ocean. Found by Davy Jones, he swore to servitude aboard the Flying Dutchman crew and escaped death.
- Davy Jones: Captain of the Flying Dutchman. Davy Jones was once a human being. Unable to bear the pain of losing his true love, he carved out his heart and put it into the Dead Man's Chest, then buried it in a secret location. He has become a bizarre creature – part octopus, part crab, part man – and collects the souls of dead or dying sailors to serve aboard his ship for one hundred years.
- Blackbeard: Legendary pirate, and captain of the Queen Anne's Revenge.
- Angelica: Jack's former love interest, and daughter of Blackbeard.
- Philip Swift: A missionary, kept prisoner aboard Blackbeard's ship.
- Syrena: A mermaid captured by Blackbeard, and love interest of Swift.
- Scrum: A self-serving member of Blackbeard's crew.
- Captain Armando Salazar: The undead Captain of the Silent Mary who seeks revenge on Jack Sparrow and attempts to steal the Trident of Poseidon to kill every pirate at sea. Bardem set out to imbue the character with "a rage based on dented pride," owing to his spectacular fall, from a high-ranking commander of a Spanish fleet to being betrayed and trapped in hell by Jack. With Salazar's body language, he tried to convey a bull in an arena, "full of rage and need of vengeance, but also wounded."
- Henry Turner: The son of Will Turner and Elizabeth Swann who vows to break his father's curse by searching for the Trident.
- Carina Smyth: A headstrong, altruistic astronomer who was wrongly accused of being a witch.

== Toy line ==
=== Construction sets ===
According to BrickLink, The Lego Group released a total of 17 Lego sets and promotional polybags as part of Lego Pirates of the Caribbean theme. The product line was eventually discontinued by the end of 2017.

In 2011, The Lego Group had a partnership with Walt Disney Pictures and Jerry Bruckheimer Films. It had announced that the eight sets based on the Pirates of the Caribbean film would be released on April 25, 2011. The eight sets being released were Isla De Muerta (set number: 4181), The Cannibal Escape (set number: 4182), The Mill (set number: 4183), Captain's Cabin (set number: 4191), Fountain of Youth (set number: 4192), The London Escape (set number: 4193), Whitecap Bay (set number: 4194) and Queen Anne's Revenge (set number: 4195). The largest sets was Queen Anne's Revenge (set number: 4195) which included 1,094 pieces and nine minifigures. In addition, the four polybag sets have been released as a promotions are Mini Black Pearl (set number: 30130), Jack Sparrow with Raft (set number: 30131), Captain Jack Sparrow (set number 30132) and Jack Sparrow (set number: 30133) in various countries around the world and the Pirates of the Caribbean Battle Pack (set number: 853219) which included five minifigures was released around the same time as the main sets. Later, The Black Pearl (set number: 4184) would be released on October 15, 2011, which included 804 pieces and six minifigures.

In April 2017, Silent Mary (set number: 71042) would be released on April 2, 2017, which included 2,294 pieces and eight minifigures. All sets will be based on the films The Curse of the Black Pearl, Dead Man's Chest, On Stranger Tides and Dead Men Tell No Tales. The sets were designed primarily for children aged 6 to 16 years old.

In August 2025, the LEGO Group announced that the Captain Jack Sparrow’s Pirate Ship (set number: 10365) would be released for LEGO Insider early access on September 12, 2025 and a full release on September 15, 2025. The set is under the LEGO Icons theme and designed for anyone ages 18+ with 2,826 and eight minifigures. From September 12 - 18, LEGO Insider members could have receive a free Captain Jack Sparrow’s Compass (set number: 5009609) set with a purchase of the Pirate Ship.

The Lego Group have also released accompanying products branded under the Lego Pirates of the Caribbean theme. These include a magnet set consisting of the Jack Sparrow, Hector Barbossa and Gunner minifigures each attached to a magnetized brick and three key chains with a key chain attached to the minifigures of Jack Sparrow, Elizabeth Swann, and Hector Barbossa. They have also released two clocks in the shape of the Jack Sparrow and Hector Barbossa minifigures and two watches based on Jack Sparrow and Hector Barbossa which both include a minifigures.

=== Lego Brickheadz sets ===
Captain Jack Sparrow (set number: 41593) and Captain Armando Salazar (set number: 41594) were released on April 2, 2017, as part of the Lego BrickHeadz theme. Captain Jack Sparrow (set number: 41593) consists of 109 pieces, a sword and 1 baseplate. Captain Armando Salazar (set number: 41594) consists of 118 pieces, a sword and 1 baseplate.

== Web short ==
=== Captain Jack's Tall Tales (2011 short) ===
Captain Jack's Tall Tales released a short film via YouTube, on June 25, 2011, that is inspired by both Pirates of the Caribbean: On Stranger Tides film as well as the Lego Pirates of the Caribbean toyline.

== Video game ==
=== Lego Pirates of the Caribbean: The Video Game (2011) ===
In May 2011, Lego Pirates of the Caribbean: The Video Game was released on the Mac OS X, Nintendo 3DS, Nintendo DS, PlayStation 3, PlayStation Portable, Wii, Microsoft Windows and Xbox 360. The game was developed by Traveller's Tales and published by Disney Interactive Studios and incorporates storylines from the first four films in the franchise.

== Reception ==
In 2011, The Lego Group reported that due to the Lego Toy Story, Lego Prince of Persia, Lego Pirates of the Caribbean and'Lego Cars 2 lines, it had for the first time in its 50-year history in the American market surpassed $1.0 billion in consumer sales of Lego products, reaching its highest share of construction toys and total U.S. toy market ever.

In 2018, the Toy Retailers Association listed The Silent Mary (set number: 71042) on its official list of 2018 Toy of the Year Awards Gala.

== See also ==
- Lego Pirates
- Lego Avatar
- Lego The Simpsons
- Lego Toy Story
- Lego Cars
- Lego Prince of Persia
- Lego The Lone Ranger
- Lego Disney
- Lego One Piece
