= Lego Speed Racer =

Lego set series

- Subject: Speed Racer
- Licensed from: Warner Bros.
- Availability: 2008–2009
- Total sets: 4
- Characters: Speed Racer, Snake Oiler, Racer X, Taejo Togokahn, Cruncher Block, Cruncher's driver, Gray Ghost, Cannonball Taylor, Pops Racer, Spritle, Trixie and a commentator.

Lego Speed Racer is a discontinued Lego theme based on the 2008 film Speed Racer (which is based on the anime of the same name). It consists of four sets which were first released in April 2008. The product line was discontinued by the end of 2008.

== Overview ==
The product line focuses on Speed Racer, an 18-year-old automobile racer who follows his apparently deceased brother's career, choosing to remain loyal to his family and their company Racer Motors, which causes difficulties after he refuses a contract that E.P. Arnold Royalton, owner of Royalton Industries, offers him. Lego Speed Racer aimed to recreate the main characters in Lego form, including Speed Racer, Snake Oiler, Racer X, Taejo Togokahn, Cruncher Block, Cruncher's driver, Gray Ghost, Cannonball Taylor, Pops Racer, Spritle, Trixie and a commentator.

== Development ==
Lego Speed Racer was inspired by the 2008 film Speed Racer. The construction toy range was based on the film and developed in collaboration with Warner Bros. Consumer Products. The construction sets were designed to recreate the story and characters of the film in Lego form.

== Launch ==
In January 2008 it was announced that The Lego Group had acquired the rights from Warner Bros. to produce four sets based on the upcoming Speed Racer film. Lego has previously partnered with Warner Bros., creating Batman and Harry Potter themes. The Lego Speed Racer theme was released under the Lego Racers brand.

The four sets were first released in the United States on April 3, 2008. In the United Kingdom the sets Speed Racer & Snake Oiler, Racer X & Taejo Togokhan, and Grand Prix Race were released on April 6, 2008, while Cruncher Block & Racer X was released later at the start of May.

== Construction sets ==
According to BrickLink, The Lego Group released 4 playsets based on the Lego Speed Racer theme. The product line was eventually discontinued by the end of 2009.

=== Speed Racer & Snake Oiler ===
Speed Racer & Snake Oiler (set number: 8158) is a 242-piece set. It features the Mach 5 supercar and Oiler's orange race car, both around 17 cm (6.5") long, and two minifigures: Speed Racer, wearing a blue pullover, and Snake Oiler.

=== Racer X & Taejo Togokhan ===
Racer X & Taejo Togokhan (set number: 8159) is a 237-piece set. It features a red and black racecar, a yellow and black race car, both around 16 cm (6") long, and two minifigures: Racer X and Taejo Togokahn, wearing a white suit.

=== Cruncher Block & Racer X ===
Cruncher Block & Racer X (set number: 8160) is a 367-piece set. It features the same yellow and black race car from the Racer X & Taejo Togokhan set, a 33 cm (13") semi truck and four minifigures: Racer X, Cruncher Block, Cruncher's driver, and Taejo Togokahn.

=== Grand Prix Race ===
Grand Prix Race (set number: 8161) is a 595-piece set. It features the Mach 6 racecar, the GRX racecar, a black and grey race car, a commentators box, a car workshop, and seven minifigures: Speed Racer wearing white racing coveralls, Gray Ghost, Cannonball Taylor, Pops Racer, Spritle, Trixie, and a commentator.

== In other media ==
The Lego Speed Racer product line briefly appeared in the 2014 film The Lego Movie as one of the many lesser Lego worlds described by Wildstyle.

== Reception ==
Animetion.co.uk rated the set 'Speed Racer & Snake Oiler' (8158) four out of five, stating the set is "great fun to build and are good enough to display or play". They however criticized the use of stickers due to the large margin of error when applying them to the bricks and that one sticker covers three bricks, which could lead to problems when deconstructing the set.

== See also ==
- Lego City
- Lego Cars
- Lego Fusion
- Lego Speed Champions
- Lego World Racers
- Lego Racers (Lego theme)
