= Lego Teenage Mutant Ninja Turtles =

Lego series

- Subject: Teenage Mutant Ninja Turtles
- Licensed from: Nickelodeon and Paramount Pictures
- Availability: 2012–2014
- Total sets: 23 (including promotional sets)
- Official website

Lego Teenage Mutant Ninja Turtles is a discontinued Lego theme based on the characters created by Kevin Eastman and Peter Laird. The theme was first introduced in 2012 and was discontinued by the end of 2014. Also included sets based on both the 2012 animated series from Nickelodeon and the 2014 film produced by Michael Bay.

== Overview ==
The product line focuses on the turtles emerging from their sewer home for the first time. They use their ninjutsu training to fight enemies in present-day New York City. In addition, a life-sized Lego model of Shredder displayed at San Diego Comic-Con, along with Lego sets based on the Teenage Mutant Ninja Turtles television series and feature film. Lego Teenage Mutant Ninja Turtles aimed to recreate the main characters in Lego form, including Leonardo, Raphael, Michaelangelo and Donatello.

== Development ==
Lego Teenage Mutant Ninja Turtles was inspired by 2012 TV series Teenage Mutant Ninja Turtles. The Lego construction toy range was based on the TV series and developed in collaboration with The Lego Group and Nickelodeon. The construction sets were designed to recreate the story and characters of the TV series in Lego form.

== Launch ==
Lego Teenage Mutant Ninja Turtles was launched at New York Comic Con in 2012. As part of the marketing campaign, The Lego Group released the first wave sets based on the 2012 animated series from Nickelodeon. Each set featured different vehicles, lair and combat robot. Minifigures were also released, including Leonardo, Raphael, Michaelangelo and Donatello.

== Characters ==
- Hamato Leonardo: Leonardo, called "Leo" for short, is an enthusiastic ninjutsu student, who wears a blue mask, and fights with two swords called Niten Ryu. He leads the various missions of the Turtles.
- Hamato Donatello: Donatello, called "Donnie" for short, is in charge of the design and manufacture of all of the tools and weapons in the Turtles' arsenal. He is also a gifted hacker. He wears a purple mask and fights with a bō which also can be converted to a naginata via a blade inside one end of the staff.
- Hamato Raphael: Raphael, also called "Raph", wears a red mask and fights with two sai. Known for his rage, he commonly takes it out on Mikey, and on occasions Leo, due to their feud. He acts as the muscles of the Turtles' attacks.
- Hamato Michelangelo: Michelangelo, known as "Mikey", is the least mature of the turtles and is a lover of video games, skateboarding, pranks and pizza. He wears an orange mask and fights with two nunchaku which also can be converted into kusarigama via a blade inside of one of the sticks of each nunchaku and extra lengths of chain stored in the other. He brings a brighter mood than his brother towards the team. (Note: The LEGO version of Michelangelo made a cameo appearance in The Lego Movie.)

== Construction sets ==
According to BrickLink, The Lego Group released a total of 23 Lego sets and promotional polybags as part of Lego Teenage Mutant Ninja Turtles theme. The product line was eventually discontinued by the end of 2014.

In 2012, The Lego Group had a partnership with Nickelodeon. The Lego Group had announced that the first wave sets based on the 2012 animated series from Nickelodeon was released on 20 December 2012. The 6 sets being released were Kraang Lab Escape (set number: 79100), Shredder's Dragon Bike (set number: 79101), Stealth Shell in Pursuit (set number: 79102), Turtle Lair Attack (set number: 79103), The Shellraiser Street Chase (set number: 79104) and Baxter Robot Rampage (set number: 79105). In addition, 2 polybag sets released as promotions are Kraang's Turtle Target Practice (set number: 30270) and Mikey's Mini-Shellraiser (set number: 30271). The two exclusive minifigures are Shadow Leonardo and Kraang were given away at New York Comic Con and the Rockefeller Lego store, respectively, to promote the theme.

In 2014, the second wave sets was released on 2 April 2014. The 8 sets being released were Karai Bike Escape (set number: 79118), Mutation Chamber Unleashed (set number: 79119), T-Rawket Sky Strike (set number: 79120), Turtle Sub Undersea Chase (set number: 79121) and Shredder's Lair Rescue (set number: 79122). Also included Turtle Lair (set number: 10669) released as a sub-brand of the Lego Juniors theme. In addition, Flashback Shredder (set number: 5002127) polybag set have been released as promotion. These included a 5 key chains with a key chain attached to the minifigures of the Donatello, Leonardo, Michelangelo, Raphael and Splinter.

Later, the sets based on the 2014 film by Michael Bay was released on 8 July 2014. The 3 sets being released were Turtle Van Takedown (set number: 79115), Big Rig Snow Getaway (set number: 79116) and Turtle Lair Invasion (set number: 79117).

The theme was designed primarily for children aged 5 to 14. Later, it was announced that the theme was discontinued and no longer available at the LEGO Store or online shop. However, the theme was eventually cancelled, with Mega Bloks receiving Teenage Mutant Ninja Turtles license for brick-based construction sets.

== Web shorts ==
The 8 web shorts have been released on YouTube inspired by both the Teenage Mutant Ninja Turtles (2012 TV series) as well as the Lego toyline.

| # | Title | Release date | Notes |
|---|---|---|---|
| 1 | Leonardo | 22 February 2013 | Lego Teenage Mutant Ninja Turtles stop motion series |
| 2 | Raphael | 22 February 2013 | Lego Teenage Mutant Ninja Turtles stop motion series |
| 3 | Donatello | 22 February 2013 | Lego Teenage Mutant Ninja Turtles stop motion series |
| 4 | Michelangelo | 23 February 2013 | Lego Teenage Mutant Ninja Turtles stop motion series |
| 5 | Donnie | 24 October 2013 | Lego Teenage Mutant Ninja Turtles stop motion series |
| 6 | Leo | 22 November 2013 | Lego Teenage Mutant Ninja Turtles stop motion series |
| 7 | Mikey | 28 November 2013 | Lego Teenage Mutant Ninja Turtles stop motion series |
| 8 | Raph | 3 December 2013 | Lego Teenage Mutant Ninja Turtles stop motion series |

== See also ==
- Lego SpongeBob SquarePants
- Lego Avatar: The Last Airbender
- Teenage Mutant Ninja Turtles (2012 TV series)
- Teenage Mutant Ninja Turtles (2014 film)
- The Lego Movie
