= Lego The Simpsons =

Lego theme

- Subject: The Simpsons
- Licensed from: 20th Century Studios and The Walt Disney Company
- Availability: 2014–present
- Total sets: 4 sets
- Characters: Homer, Marge, Bart, Lisa, and Maggie
- Official website

Lego The Simpsons is a Lego theme based on The Simpsons created by cartoonist Matt Groening for the Fox Broadcasting Company. It is licensed from 20th Century Studios and The Walt Disney Company. The toy line is also accompanied by the special episode Brick Like Me that premiered on the Fox network in the United States on 4 May 2014 and the Lego Dimensions toys-to-life video game. The theme was first introduced on 1 February 2014 and was discontinued by the end of 31 December 2018 before being re-continued on 4 June 2025.

== Overview ==
The product line focuses on the eponymous family consisting of Homer, Marge, Bart, Lisa and Maggie. Lego The Simpsons aims to recreate the main characters in Lego form, including Homer, Marge, Bart, Lisa and Maggie, along with their neighbor Ned Flanders.

== Development ==
Lego The Simpsons was inspired by The Simpsons television series. The Lego construction toy range was based on the television series and developed in collaboration with 20th Century Fox Consumer Products (later merged by Disney Experiences). The construction sets were designed to recreate the story and characters of the television series in Lego form.

== Launch ==
Lego The Simpsons theme was launched on 1 February 2014. The Lego Group had a partnership with 20th Century Fox (currently known as 20th Century Studios). As part of the marketing campaign, The Lego Group released The Simpsons House (set number: 71006) on 1 February 2014 and The Lego Simpsons Series 1 (set number: 71005) on 1 May 2014. The set was produced to celebrate the 25th anniversary of The Simpsons.

== Toy line ==
According to BrickLink, The Lego Group released a total of two Lego sets as part of Lego The Simpsons theme. The product line was eventually discontinued by the end of 31 December 2018.

=== Construction sets ===
==== The Simpsons House ====
The Simpsons House (set number: 71006) was released on 1 February 2014 and based on a version of The Simpsons house, the residence of the Simpson family in the animated sitcom and in the movie based on the series. The house's address is most frequently attributed as 742 Evergreen Terrace. In the series, the house is occupied by Homer and Marge and their three children: Bart, Lisa and Maggie. The set consists of 2523 pieces with six minifigures of Homer, Marge, Bart, Lisa, Maggie and Ned Flanders, and includes the house's first floor, living room, Bart’s bedroom, Marge and Homer’s bedroom, Lisa’s bedroom, bathroom, detachable garage and family car. The Simpsons House (set number: 71006) was designed by Lego senior designer Marcos Bessa.

==== Kwik-E-Mart ====
Kwik-E-Mart (set number: 71016) was released on 1 May 2015 and based on a version of the Kwik-E-Mart convenience store in The Simpsons. It is a parody of American convenience stores, such as 7-Eleven and Cumberland Farms, and depicts many of the stereotypes about them. It is notorious for its high prices and the poor quality of its merchandise, and is run by an Indian-American named Apu Nahasapeemapetilon. It first appeared in the 1990 episode "The Telltale Head" and has since become a common setting in the series. The Simpsons family are regular customers. The set consists of 2179 pieces with six minifigures of Homer Simpson, Bart Simpson, Marge Simpson, Apu Nahasapeemapetilon, Chief Wiggum and Snake (a.k.a. Jailbird). It also includes shelves, refrigerator cabinets, a counter and Chief Wiggum's police car. Kwik-E-Mart (set number: 71016) was designed by Lego senior designer Marcos Bessa.

==== Krusty Burger ====
Krusty Burger (set number: 10352) was released on 4 June 2025, as part of the Lego Icons theme. It has 1635 pieces and is based on the Krusty Burger restaurant themed after Krusty the Clown, who appears as a minifigure sporting a farmer's outfit, referencing the 2009 episode "Coming to Homerica", in which he introduces a vegetarian burger. The set includes six additional minifigures of Homer Simpson, Bart Simpson, Lisa Simpson, the Squeaky Voiced Teen, Officer Lou, and Sideshow Bob.

Living Room (Free gift with purchase)

From 1-7 June 2025, LEGO Insider members could receive a free Living Room (set number: 5009325) set when they purchased the Krusty Burger set from LEGO stores or LEGO.com.

=== Collectible minifigures ===
==== The Lego Simpsons Series 1 ====
The Lego Simpsons Series 1 (set number: 71005) was released on 1 May 2014 as part of the Lego Minifigures theme, and includes characters from The Simpsons television series. It consists of 16 different minifigures, including Homer, Bart, Marge, Lisa, Maggie, Grampa, Ned Flanders, Krusty the Clown, Milhouse, Ralph, Apu, Nelson, Itchy, Scratchy, Chief Wiggum, and Mr. Burns.

==== The Lego Simpsons Series 2 ====
The Lego Simpsons Series 2 (set number: 71009) was released on 1 May 2015 as part of the Lego Minifigures theme, and includes characters from The Simpsons television series. It consists of 16 different minifigures, including Date Night Homer, Date Night Marge, Pajamas Lisa with Snowball II, Maggie with Santa's Little Helper, Bartman, Milhouse as Fallout Boy, Comic Book Guy, Martin Prince, Professor Frink, Hans Moleman, Selma, Patty, Groundskeeper Willie, Edna Krabappel, Smithers, and Dr. Hibbert.

=== Lego BrickHeadz sets ===
Homer Simpson & Krusty the Clown (set number: 41632) was released on 2 October 2018 as part of the Lego BrickHeadz theme and based on The Simpsons television series. The set consists of 215 pieces and two baseplates.

== Television series and film ==
=== Brick Like Me ===
"Brick Like Me" is the twentieth episode of the twenty-fifth season of the American animated television series The Simpsons and the 550th episode of the series. It first aired on the Fox network in the United States on May 4, 2014. It was written by Brian Kelley and directed by Matthew Nastuk. The episode features a mix of traditional animation and computer animation. In the episode, Homer wakes up in an alternate reality where everyone and everything is made of Lego bricks, and he must figure his way out before he gets stuck in the plastic world forever. This episode won the Writers Guild of America Award for Outstanding Writing in Animation at the 67th Writers Guild of America Awards.

=== The Lego Movie ===
Milhouse makes a cameo appearance in the 2014 film The Lego Movie as a Master Builder in Cloud Cuckoo Land.

== Video game ==
=== Lego Dimensions ===
The crossover toys-to-life game Lego Dimensions developed by Traveller's Tales features content based on The Simpsons television series, although the only characters who speak are ones originally voiced by Dan Castellaneta via archival audio from various episodes. A "Level Pack" based on "The Mysterious Voyage of Homer Simpson" (which also features archival audio of the late Johnny Cash) adds Homer Simpson as a playable character. Additional "Fun packs" add Bart Simpson and Krusty the Clown as playable characters.

== Reception ==
=== Lego The Simpsons sets ===
Elyse Betters of Pocket-Lint gave The Simpsons House (set number: 71006) a positive review, saying "The Simpsons House is definitely a great collectors' item that will also give you hundreds of hours of play time."

=== Brick Like Me ===
The episode received a 2.0 rating and was watched by a total of 4.39 million people, making it the second most watched show on Animation Domination that night, beating Bob's Burgers and American Dad!.

Since its broadcast, "Brick Like Me" has received generally positive reviews from critics.

Jesse Schedeen of IGN gave it an 8.2/10 "Great" rating, saying, "The similarities to The Lego Movie are unfortunate, but there's still a lot of fun to be had in this latest Simpsons milestone episode. As long as this show has been on the air, any deviation from the norm is welcome. There's plenty of entertainment value in seeing a LEGO-ized Springfield and its blocky inhabitants. And the headier themes and story elements, if redundant at this point, should still connect with anyone who grew up playing with LEGOs. Now the only question is what the producers will cook up for a 600th episode celebration."

Dennis Perkins of The A.V. Club gave the episode an A−, saying "'Brick Like Me' is a miracle of an episode, a heartfelt, inventive, exquisitely performed, and tightly written half-hour that reinforces what I've been saying all season—there's no reason why The Simpsons can't be good again."

Tim Surette of TV.com said, "By the time Bart came out in his twisted mech suit and barfed out lightsabers, 'Brick Like Me' was just a grab bag of random pieces coming together in an effort to form something bigger—kind of like the handiwork of a kid who showed up late to a Lego party and didn't get his pick of the pieces so he built whatever he could from odds and ends. But visually, 'Brick Like Me' was a stunner, rebuilding Springfield in bright, brick-by-brick 3D, and that's what the episode will forever be known for."

James Poniewozik of Time gave the episode a positive review, saying "'Brick Like Me' demonstrates that The Simpsons still has it, at least sometimes. Afterward, you and the kids can pop in the season 3 DVD and compare. Or put together the Lego Simpsons' House–only $199.99, Brik-E-Mart not included."

Chris Morgan of Paste gave the episode an 8.6 out of 10, saying "This has been a fairly lackluster season of The Simpsons, and one expects that 25 seasons and 550 episodes will wear on you. This Lego episode could have been tone deaf and lazy, but instead it is far and away the best episode of this season, and one of the better episodes in recent memory. It's clever and visually impressive and, most importantly, quite humorous. This used to be a show that could make you laugh uproariously with frequency—without resorting to special event episodes. Maybe that isn't the case so much anymore, but there is still the capacity for top-notch television floating somewhere in The Simpsons universe."

Tony Sokol of Den of Geek gave the episode four and a half stars out of five, saying "So, I came in wary but no, it's a good payoff. Not jam-packed with jokes this time, but no misfires. On a show like The Simpsons, as long as it's been running and with so many jokes packed per animated cell, we forgive a lot of misfired jokes. Overall, the balance is always tilted toward funny and they didn't lose their subversive core. 'Brick Like Me' has no groaners. It will be considered a classic, yeah. Not my favorite classic, but it is already memorable, lest I forget, and satisfying. In five years, fans will instantly recognize 'the Lego episode.' It was strangely exhilarating. Everything fit and no one got hurt."

Screen Rant called it the best episode of the 25th season.

== Awards and nominations ==
Brick Like Me writer Brian Kelley won the Writers Guild of America Award for Outstanding Writing in Animation at the 67th Writers Guild of America Awards for his script to this episode.

== See also ==
- Lego Toy Story
- Lego Cars
- Lego Prince of Persia
- Lego Pirates of the Caribbean
- Lego The Lone Ranger
- Lego Disney
- Lego Avatar
