= LEGO Speed Champions =

Lego scale models of production cars

== Overview ==
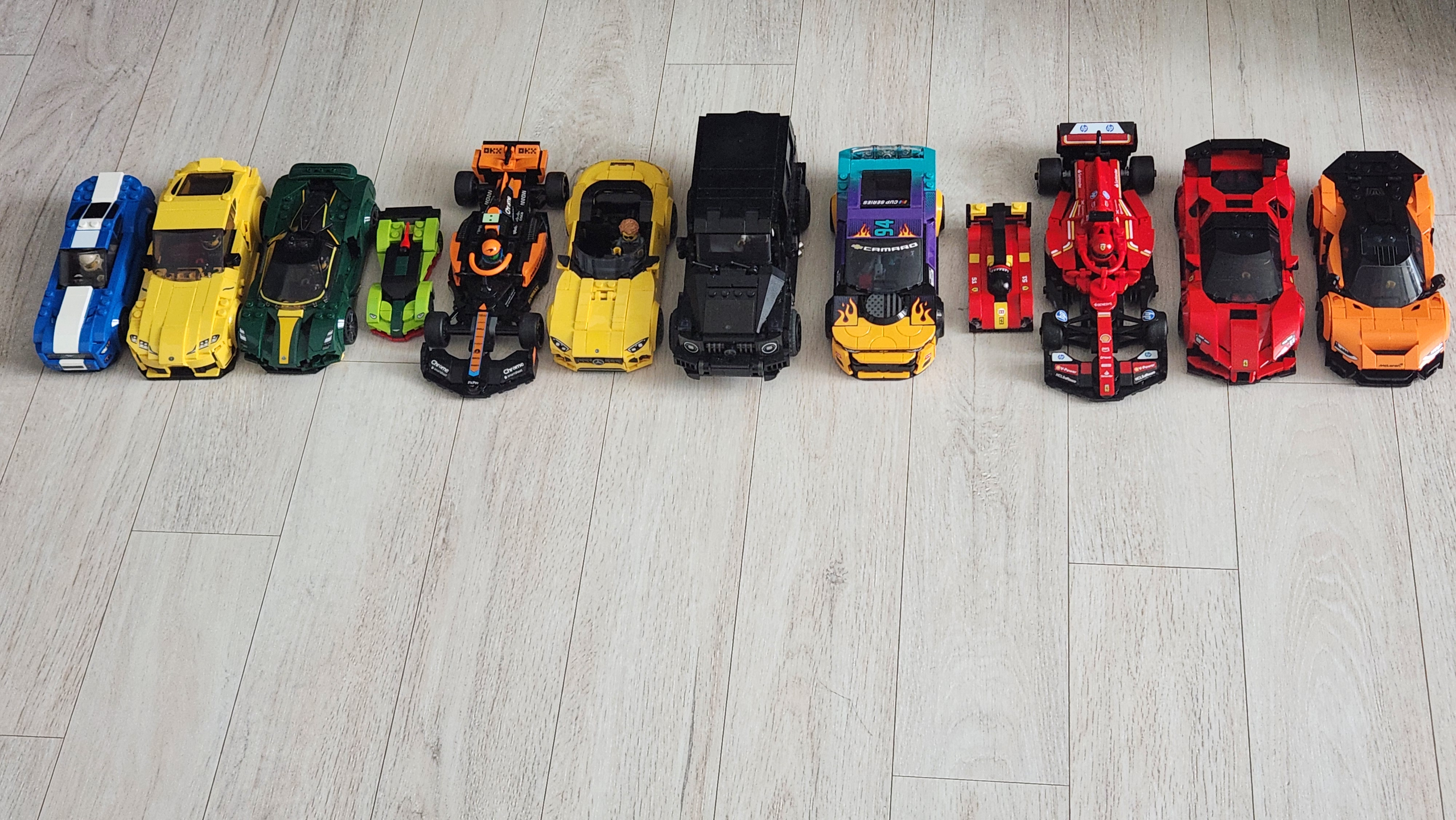
11 Speed Champions Products

LEGO Speed Champions is an auto racing-inspired theme of LEGO building sets first released in 2015 featuring classic and modern styles from well-known car brands.

Lego Speed Champions
- Subject: Real-life cars
- Licensed from: Various vehicle manufacturers
- Availability: 2015–present
- Total sets: 68
- Official website

== Launch ==
Initially launched on March 1, 2015 LEGO Speed Champions brought real cars into the hands of kids and fans of all ages. For this initial year the LEGO Group announced a partnership with Ferrari, McLaren, and Porsche. As part of the marketing campaign, The Lego Group released six sets based on racing cars. Each set featured different racing cars such as Ferrari F14 T, McLaren P1 , and Porsche 918. The sets were designed primarily for children 7 to 14 years old.

== 6-Studs Wide 2015-2019 ==
LEGO Speed Champions were 6-studs wide between the years of 2015 and 2019. This scale matched the size and scale of most LEGO building sets, including LEGO City and LEGO modular sets. Builders with just one city or modular set or collectors with full basement city layouts found these vehicles to be the perfect addition to their displays. Kits cost around $14.99 and had 150-200 pieces.

== 8-Studs Wide 2020-Present ==
In 2020 LEGO Speed Champions surprised builders and collectors by changing the size to vehicles that were 8-studs wide. This new size allowed for better proportions, realism, and detail, and they too were an immediate hit.

With the wider vehicle size there was now room for two minifigs to sit side by side instead of just one as in the 6-stud wide vehicles.

LEGO was clear that this change was also an attempt to attract more adult collectors.

With the larger size the number of parts nearly doubled, with 250-350 parts.

The price has more than doubled too, going from $19.99 in 2020 up to $45.99 or more currently.

== List of Sets ==
Year	Name	Information	Pieces	Set #	Photo
2015	LaFerrari	Includes a driver, starting lights, helmet and wrench. Features unique wheel trims and authentic Ferrari details. Red. Why the series started with set # 75899 and the second car jumped to set # 75908 is unknown.	164	75899	Ferrari LaFerrari
2015	Ferrari 458 Italia GT2	Includes a driver, helmet, wrench, and silver-colored trophy. Features unique wheel trims and authentic Ferrari details. Red.	153	75908	Ferrari 458 Italia GT2
2015	McLaren P1	Includes a driver, race curb, 3 cones, helmet, and wrench. Features unique wheel trims and authentic McLaren details. Yellow.	168	75909	McLaren P1
2015	Porsche 918 Spyder	Includes a driver, race curb, checkered flag, helmet, wrench, and two types of wheel trims to choose from. Features authentic Porsche details. White.	151	75910	Porsche 918 Spyder
2015	McLaren Mercedes Pit Stop	Includes 3 minifigures: a driver, male pit crew and female pit crew. The larger kit also included fold-out garage or pit stop walls with fuel pump, 2 spare tires/wheels, computer console with 3 screens, 2 movable wheel guns, tool storage, complete tool set, lap time board, a golden trophy, 2 interchangeable noses, helmet, cap with headphones, and a start/stop sign. Grey.	332	75911	F14 T
2015	Porsche 911 GT Finish Line	Includes two Porsche 911 GT race cars, 4 minifigures: 2 Porsche drivers, a camera woman and a race marshal. Also came with a start/finish line with race-starting lights, podium/mini-garage with a work station, 8 international flags, 2 checkered flags, 1st, 2nd, and 3rd place tags, a silver and gold trophy, tool trolley with assorted tools, spare wheel with trolley, 2 driver's helmets, 2 winner's caps, flag man's cap, and TV camera. Features unique Porsche 911 wheel trims. One orange car and one white.	551	75912	Both Porsche 911 GT race cars
2015	F14 T & Scuderia Ferrari Truck	Includes the formula race car and fully-equipped Ferrari transport truck/shop. 6 minifigures: a driver, team truck driver, and 4 crew members. The truck features driver's cabin with opening roof, detachable trailer with opening roof and sides for easy access, lever-operated standing feet and retractable rear hatch/ramp, scooter, complete tool set, computer screens, 2 tool chests, trophy, coffee mug, choice of 2 noses and 2 different wheel trims, 2 helmets, 3 caps with headphones, lap board and a stop/start sign. Red.	884	75913	Scuderia Ferrari SF16-H
2016	Chevrolet Corvette Z06	Includes a Chevrolet racing driver minifigure, 2 sets of interchangeable wheels trims, driver's helmet, wrench, and TV camera. Yellow.	173	75870	Chevrolet Corvette Z06
2016	Ford Mustang GT	Includes a Ford Racing driver minifigure, 2 sets of interchangeable wheel trims, helmet, wrench, and a lap time board. Blue with white stripe up the middle.	185	75871	Ford Mustang GT
2016	Audi R18 e-tron quattro	Includes an Audi Racing driver minifigure, 2 sets of interchangeable wheel trims, helmet, wrench, and fuel pump. White, black, and grey.	166	75872	
2016	Audi R8 LMS ultra		175	75873	
2016	Chevrolet Camaro Drag Race		445	75874	
2016	Ford F-150 Raptor & Ford Model A Hot Rod		664	75875	
2016	Porsche 919 Hybrid and 917k Pit Lane		732	75876	
2017	Mercedes-AMG GT3		196	75877	
2017	Bugatti Chiron		181	75878	
2017	Scuderia Ferrari SF16-H		184	75879	
2017	McLaren 720S		161	75880	
2017	2016 Ford GT & 1966 Ford GT40		366	75881	
2017	Ferrari FXX K & Development Center		494	75882	
2017	MERCEDES AMG PETRONAS Formula One Team		941	75883	
2018	1968 Ford Mustang Fastback		183	75884	
2018	Ford Fiesta M-Sport WRC		203	75885	
2018	Ferrari 488 GT3 "Scuderia Corsa"		179	75886	
2018	Porsche 919 Hybrid		163	75887	
2018	Porsche 911 RSR and 911 Turbo 3.0		391	75888	
2018	Ferrari Ultimate Garage		841	75889	
2019	Ferrari F40 Competizione		198	75890	
2019	Chevrolet Camaro ZL1 Race Car		198	75891	
2019	McLaren Senna		219	75892	
2019	2018 Dodge Challenger SRT Demon and 1970 Dodge Charger R/T		478	75893	
2019	1967 Mini Cooper S Rally and 2018 MINI John Cooper Works Buggy		481	75894	
2019	1974 Porsche 911 Turbo 3.0		180	75895	
2020	Ferrari F8 Tributo		275	76895	
2020	Nissan GT-R NISMO		298	76896	
2020	1985 Audi Sport quattro S1		250	76897	
2020	Formula E Panasonic Jaguar Racing GEN2 car & Jaguar I-PACE eTROPHY		565	76898	
2020	Lamborghini Urus ST-X & Lamborghini Huracán Super Trofeo EVO		663	76899	
2021	Koenigsegg Jesko		280	76900	
2021	Toyota GR Supra		299	76901	
2021	McLaren Elva		263	76902	
2021	Chevrolet Corvette C8.R Race Car and 1969 Chevrolet Corvette		512	76903	
2021	Mopar Dodge//SRT Top Fuel Dragster and 1970 Dodge Challenger T/A		627	76904	
2021	Ford GT Heritage Edition and Bronco R		660	76905	
2022	1970 Ferrari 512 M		291	76906	
2022	Lotus Evija		247	76907	
2022	Lamborghini Countach		262	76908	
2022	Mercedes-AMG F1 W12 E Performance & Mercedes-AMG Project One		564	76909	
2022	Aston Martin Valkyrie AMR Pro and Aston Martin Vantage GT3		592	76910	
2022	007 Aston Martin DB5		298	76911	
2022	Fast & Furious 1970 Dodge Charger R/T		345	76912	
2023	Ferrari 812 Competizione		261	76914	
2023	Pagani Utopia		249	76915	
2023	Porsche 963		280	76916	
2023	2 Fast 2 Furious Nissan Skyline GT-R (R34)		319	76917	
2023	McLaren Solus GT & McLaren F1 LM		581	76918	
2024	2023 McLaren Formula 1 Race Car		245	76919	
2024	Ford Mustang Dark Horse Sports Car		344	76920	
2024	Audi S1 e-tron quattro Race Car		274	76921	
2024	BMW M4 GT3 & BMW M Hybrid V8 Race Cars		676	76922	
2024	Lamborghini Lambo V12 Vision GT Super Car		230	76923	
2024	Mercedes-AMG G 63 & Mercedes-AMG SL 63		808	76924	
2024	Aston Martin Safety Car & AMR23		564	76925	
2024	Ferrari F40 Supercar		318	76934	
2024	NASCAR Next Gen Chevrolet Camaro ZL1		328	76935	
2025	Ferrari SF-24		275	77242	
2025	Red Bull Racing RB20		251	77243	
2025	Mercedes-AMG F1 W15 E Race Car		267	77244	
2025	Aston Martin Aramco F1 AMR24		269	77245	
2025	Visa Cash App VCARB 01 F1		248	77246	
2025	KICK Sauber F1 Team C44		259	77247	
2025	BWT Alpine F1 Team A524		258	77248	
2025	Williams Racing FW46		263	77249	
2025	MoneyGram Haas F1 Team VF-24		242	77250	
2025	McLaren F1 Team MCL38		269	77251	
2025	2 Fast 2 Furious Honda S2000		300	77241	
2025	Dodge Challenger SRT Hellcat Race Car		390	77237	
2025	Lamborghini Revuelto & Huracan STO		607	77238	
2025	Porsche 911 GT3 RS Super Car		348	77239	
2025	Bugatti Centodieci Sports Car		291	77240	
2026	Lightning McQueen		270	77255	
2026	DeLorean from Back To The Future		357	77256	
2026	Ferrari SF90 XX Stradale Sports Car		339	77254	
2026	McLaren W1		287	77257	
2026	Bugatti Vision GT		284	77253	
2026	APXGP Team Race Car from F1 The Movie		268	77252	
2026	F1 Academy LEGO Race Car		210	77258	
2026	Audi Revolut F1 Team R26 Race car		216	77259	
2026	Toyota Supra MK4 Fast & Furious		292	77260	
2026	Ferrari 499P		329	77261	
2026	Ken Block's '65 Ford Mustang Hoonicorn V1		345	77262	
2026	Jaguar F-TYPE Project 7& Land Rover Defender		740	77264	
2026	BMW M3 (E30)		358	77263	

== Web shorts ==
The product line was accompanied by a series of animated short films that were released on YouTube.

- LEGO Speed Champions- Official Trailer was an official web short was released on YouTube on 26 February 2015 that was inspired by Lego Speed Champions sets (Ferrari, McLaren and Porsche).
- Mercedes AMG Petronas Formula One Team - LEGO Speed Champions - 75883 - Playstarter Animation was an official web short was released on YouTube on 21 June 2017 that inspired by both Lego Speed Champions sets and Mercedes AMG Petronas Formula One Team.
- Forza Horizon 4 LEGO Speed Champions - Backseat Driver was an official web short was released on YouTube on 16 August 2019 that inspired by both Lego Speed Champions sets and Forza Horizon 4.

== Video games ==
in 2015 a promotional game was released for iOS, Android and it was available on its own website. it features nearly every car from the first two years as well as fictional tracks. It's no longer available on the App Store because of licensing issues

It was announced at E3 2019 that The Lego Group and Playground Games had partnered together to add a new expansion pack to Forza Horizon 4 featuring several cars from the line and a new location made out of Lego bricks. The expansion pack was released on June 13, 2019.

Announced June 2023, 2K Games unveiled a downloadable content pack, Drive Pass Season 1 for Lego 2K Drive was released on 28 June 2023. It adds the 1970 Dodge Charger R/T and the Nissan Skyline GT-R as playable. It includes Bricklandia's Fast Crew, sisters Rita and Lita Malachi, pilot Doug and resident techie Ronnie (aka CoNfL8t).

== Reception ==
In 2020, The Lego Group reported that the Lego Technic, Lego Star Wars, Lego Classic, Lego Disney, Lego Harry Potter, and Lego Speed Champions themes had helped to push revenue for the first half of 2020 grew 7% to DKK 15.7 billion compared with the same period in 2019.

== See also ==
- Lego City
- Lego Cars
- Lego Fusion
- Lego Racers
- Lego Speed Racer
- Lego World Racers
