= Lego Juniors Create & Cruise =

2012 video game

- App icon
- Developer: Funday Factory (2014)
- Platforms: iOS, Android, Windows
- Release: 2012 (as Lego App4+); 2014 (as Lego Juniors Create & Cruise)

Lego Juniors Create & Cruise (originally Lego App4+) is a 2012 mobile game based on the Lego Juniors line of sets released for iOS, Android, and Windows 10. The game was created for young audiences. It has since been delisted and is no longer available for download.

== Gameplay ==
After customizing a minifigure and vehicle, the gameplay consists of the player driving the vehicle across the main world while collecting coins, which in turn can unlock more minifigure and vehicle parts. Players could also unlock Lego sets and put them together in the game.

== Development ==
Developer Funday Factory is based in Aarhus, Denmark. The app was released in 2012 as Lego App4+, which was in 2D. It was originally supposed to have more features, but the developers chose to trim them in order to make the app more simple for the target audience. The studio Funday Factory took over development and redesigned the game in 3D, after which it was relaunched as Lego Juniors Create & Cruise. Regular updates continued until around 2018, after which it was retired.

== Reception ==
According to Lego, the game received over 200 million downloads, making it the most downloaded app ever released by them. It was among the top educational games on the Google Play Store in 2015.
