= Lego Cars =

Lego theme

- Subject: Cars franchise
- Licensed from: Disney and Pixar
- Availability: 2010–Present
- Total sets: 27 Lego (including promotional sets), 8 Lego Juniors and 20 Duplo
- Characters: Acer, Battleboat, Broadside, Carla Veloso, Crane, Cruz Ramirez, Doc Hudson, Fillmore, Finn McMissile, Flo, Francesco Bernoulli, Miss Fritter, Guido, Grem, Holley Shiftwell, Jackson Storm, Jeff Gorvette, Junior Moon, Leland Turbo Cube, Lightning McQueen, Luigi, Mack, Mater, Max Schnell, Miles Axlerod, Pit Crew Helper, Petrov Trunkov, The Queen, Ramone, Raoul ÇaRoule, Red, Rod "Torque" Redline, Sheriff, Sally Carrera, Sarge, Shu Todoroki, Siddeley, Smokey, Sterling, Tony Trihull and Professor Zündapp
- Official website

Lego Cars (stylized as LEGO Cars) is a Lego theme based on the Disney·Pixar's Cars franchise created by John Lasseter, Joe Ranft and Jorgen Klubien. It was licensed from The Walt Disney Company and Pixar. The theme was first introduced in 2010 for Duplo Cars sub-theme based on the Cars film was released as part of the Duplo theme. In 2011, Lego Cars 2 sub-theme based on the Cars 2 film was released as part of the Lego System and Duplo theme. In 2017, Lego Juniors Cars 3 sub-theme based on the Cars 3 film was released as part of the Lego Juniors and Duplo theme.

== Overview ==
Lego Cars was based on the Disney·Pixar's Cars franchise, which focused on the story takes place in a world populated by anthropomorphic talking cars and other vehicles. Lego Cars aimed to recreate the main characters in Lego form, including Lightning McQueen, Mater, Sally Carrera, Doc Hudson, Ramone, Mack, Sheriff, Flo, Guido and Luigi.

In addition, Lego Cars 2 trailer was released on YouTube shortly before the film, recreating it in Lego form.

The sequel film, Cars 3, was released in May 2017 on YouTube. Lego produced various toy sets based on the Cars 3 film ahead of its release. In addition, Lego Juniors Cars 3 trailer was released shortly before the film, recreating it in Lego form.

== Development ==
Lego Cars was inspired by Cars franchise. The Lego construction toy range was based on the animated franchise and developed in collaboration with Disney Consumer Products. The construction sets were designed to recreate the story and characters of the film in Lego form.

== Launch ==
Duplo Cars sub-theme was launched at the American International Toy Fair in June 2010. The Lego Group released four Duplo sets based on the Cars film. Next year, Lego Cars 2 sub-theme was launched at the American International Toy Fair in 2011. As part of the marketing campaign, The Lego Group released fourteen Lego sets based on the Cars 2 film. Each set featured different World Grand Prix, vehicles and Radiator Springs. Lego Juniors Cars 3 sub-theme was launched at the American International Toy Fair in 2017. The Lego Group released eight Lego Juniors sets and three Duplo sets based on the Cars 3 film.

== Characters ==
- Mater: A Southern-accented tow truck from Radiator Springs.
- Lightning McQueen: A Piston Cup racecar.
- Doc Hudson: A 1951 Hudson Hornet who is later revealed to be the Fabulous Hudson Hornet.
- Sally Carrera: A 2002 996-series Porsche 911 Carrera.
- Luigi: A 1959 Fiat 500.
- Ramone: A 1959 Chevrolet Impala Lowrider.
- Sheriff: A 1949 Mercury Club Coupe (police package).
- Fillmore: A 1960 VW Bus.
- Sarge: A 1941 Willys model jeep, in the style used by the US Military.
- Flo: A 1957 General Motors Motorama show car.
- Guido: A custom forklift, resembling an Isetta at the front who speaks only in Italian.
- Mack: A 1985 Mack Super-Liner.
- Red: A 1960s style fire engine (most closely resembles a mid-1960s) and Jerry Recycled Batteries, the mean Peterbilt truck whom Lightning McQueen mistakes for Mack while lost.
- Finn McMissile: A British spy car.
- Holley Shiftwell: A beautiful young British desk agent, new to field work.
- Francesco Bernoulli: McQueen's main racing rival from Italy.
- Professor Zündapp: The doctor from Germany, Axlerod's assistant.
- Grem and Acer: Professor Zündapp's henchmen.
- The Queen: A classic Rolls-Royce Phantom car watching the race from Buckingham Palace. She knights Mater for his bravery in foiling Axlerod's plot. Her roof racks are made to look like a crown.
- Rod "Torque" Redline An American spy car.
- Cruz Ramirez: Lightning McQueen's trainer.
- Smokey: Doc Hudson's former mechanic and crew chief.
- Harv: A Lightning McQueen's Agent and the new Rust-eze team owner.
- Jackson Storm: McQueen's new racing rival.

== Construction sets ==
According to BrickLink, The Lego Group released a total of 20 sets of Duplo Cars, 27 sets and promotional polybags associated with Lego Cars 2 and 8 sets of Lego Juniors Cars 3.

=== Duplo Cars sets ===
In 2010, The Lego Group announced a partnership with The Walt Disney Company and Pixar. It was officially announced by The Lego Group that the four sets based on the Cars film was released on 4 June 2010 have been released as part of the Duplo theme. The four sets being released were Lightning McQueen, Mater's Yard, Flo's V-8 Cafe and Mack's Road Trip!.

In 2011, the six sets based on the Cars 2 film was released on 12 May 2011. The six sets being released were Agent Mater, Luigi's Italian Place, Tokyo Racing, Big Bentley, The Pit Shop and World Grand Prix.

In 2012, the three sets was released on 24 July 2012. The three sets being released were Red, Race Day and Siddeley Saves the Day.

In 2015, Classic Race set was released on 1 January 2015. The set consists of 29 pieces.

In 2017, three sets based on the Cars 3 film. The 3 sets being released were Flo's Café, Mater's Shed and Piston Cup Race.

In 2020, Lightning McQueen's Race Day set was released on 24 August 2020. The set consists of 42 pieces. Later, The Lego Group announced the Lightning McQueen's Race Day set was retired at the end of 31 December 2021.

In 2023, Lightning McQueen & Mater's Car Wash Fun set was released on 1 January 2023. The set consists of 29 pieces. Buildable characters including Doc Hudson, Guido, Fillmore, Flo, Luigi, Lightning McQueen, Mack, Mater, Red, Sally Carrera and Sheriff were released as well. These sets are twice the length, height, and width of traditional Lego bricks, making them easier to handle and less likely to be swallowed by younger children. Despite their size, they are still compatible with traditional Lego bricks. The sets were designed primarily for children aged 2 to 5 years old.

=== Lego Cars 2 sets ===
In 2011, it was officially announced that the fourteen sets based on the Cars 2 film was released on 12 May 2011. The fourteen sets being released were Radiator Springs Lightning McQueen, Radiator Springs Classic Mater, Tokyo Pit Stop, World Grand Prix Racing Rivalry, Mater's Spy Zone, Escape At Sea, Ultimate Build Lightning McQueen, Mack's Team Truck, Flo's V8 Café, Spy Jet Escape, Big Bentley Bust Out, Ultimate Build Mater, Ultimate Build Francesco and Tokyo International Circuit.

Later, the eight sets was released on 16 December 2011. The eight sets being released were Francesco Bernoulli, Ivan Mater, Finn McMissile, Jeff Gorvette, Agent Mater's Escape, Red's Water Rescue, Ultimate Race Set and Oil Rig Escape. In addition, the three polypag sets have been released as a promotions are Guido, Grem and "Torque" Redline Promotional Set. (Note: This polybag set only available from US Toys "R" Us stores on Saturday 15 October 2011, between 2pm & 4pm, as part of their month-long 'Bricktober' promotion. Set included instructions and sticker sheet, but no other packaging.) Buildable characters including Acer, Battleboat, Carla Veloso, Crane, Francesco Bernoulli, Finn McMissile, Holley Shiftwell, Jeff Gorvette, Grem, Leland Turbo cube, Miles Axlerod, Professor Zundapp, Pit Crew Helper, Rod "Torque" Redline, Raoule CaRoule, Max Schnell, Shu Todoroki, The Queen and Tony Trihull were released as well. The sets were designed primarily for children aged 5 to 12 years old.

=== Lego Juniors Cars 3 sets ===
In 2017, the seven sets based on the Cars 3 film was released on 2 May 2017 have also been released as part of the Lego Juniors theme. The seven sets being released were Lightning McQueen Speed Launcher, Cruz Ramirez Race Simulator, Guido and Luigi's Pit Stop, Mater's Junkyard, Willy's Butte Speed Training, Smokey's Garage and Thunder Hollow Crazy 8 Race.

Later, Florida 500 Final Race set was released on 1 August 2017. The set consists of 266 pieces. Buildable characters including Broadside, Cruz Ramirez, Junior Moon, Jackson Storm, Miss Fritter and Smokey were released as well. These sets were specifically designed to be simpler to build with fewer pieces and slightly larger building elements. The sets were designed primarily for children aged 4 to 7 years old.

== Web shorts ==
The product line was accompanied by a series of animated short films that was released on YouTube.

=== Lego Cars 2 (2011 shorts) ===
The 13 web shorts have been released on YouTube inspired by both the Cars 2 film as well as the Lego toyline. It also available in Lego Cars 2 video disc as a free gift for qualify purchase of Cars 2 Blu-ray combo pack at Toys "R" Us.

#	Title	Release date	Notes
1	Mater's Brick Tales: The Great Race Case	November 23, 2011	Lego Cars 2:Mater's Brick Tales stop motion series. Narrated by Larry the Cable Guy, who is the voice role of Mater in the Cars films.
2	Mater's Brick Tales: Mystery of the Missing Parts	January 9, 2012	Lego Cars 2:Mater's Brick Tales stop motion series. Narrated by Larry the Cable Guy, who is the voice role of Mater in the Cars films.
3	Mater's Brick Tales: Mater's Spy Surprise	May 19, 2012	Lego Cars 2:Mater's Brick Tales stop motion series. Narrated by Larry the Cable Guy, who is the voice role of Mater in the Cars films.
4	Designer Video 1	October 10, 2012	Lego Cars 2 Designer Videos series.
5	Designer Video 2	October 10, 2012	Lego Cars 2 Designer Videos series.
6	Designer Video 3	October 10, 2012	Lego Cars 2 Designer Videos series.
7	Designer Video 4	October 10, 2012	Lego Cars 2 Designer Videos series.
8	Designer Video 5	October 10, 2012	Lego Cars 2 Designer Videos series.
9	Designer Video 6	October 10, 2012	Lego Cars 2 Designer Videos series.
10	Designer Video 7	October 4, 2013	Lego Cars 2 Designer Videos series.
11	Designer Video 8	November 9, 2013	Lego Cars 2 Designer Videos series.
12	Designer Video 9	November 9, 2013	Lego Cars 2 Designer Videos series.
13	Designer Video 10	November 10, 2013	Lego Cars 2 Designer Videos series.

=== Lego Cars 3 (2017 shorts) ===
The 2 web shorts have been released on YouTube inspired by both the Cars 3 film as well as the Lego toyline.

- Cars 3 As Told By LEGO Bricks (2017) - An official web short was released on YouTube on 21 December 2017, that is inspired by both the Cars animated series as well as the Lego toyline. The film tells the story of Lightning McQueen, Cruz Ramirez and Jackson Storm.
- Mater, Cruz Ramirez, Lightning McQueen and The Stig Race Europe (2018) - BBC, Disney and LEGO released a short film via YouTube, on 13 April 2018, that is inspired by both the Cars animated series as well as the popular TV series Top Gear. The film tells the story of Lightning McQueen's trip to the Top Gear track, where he achieves his dream of racing against the Stig.

== Video game ==
=== Lego The Incredibles ===
A crossover Lego-themed action-adventure video game named Lego The Incredibles was developed by TT Fusion. Lego The Incredibles was released by Warner Bros. Interactive Entertainment on 15 June 2018 in North America and on 13 July 2018 in Europe. A macOS version of the game was released by Feral Interactive on 21 November 2018. It includes Lightning McQueen as a secret playable character.

== Reception ==
In 2011, The Lego Group reported that due to the Lego Toy Story, Lego Prince of Persia, Lego Pirates of the Caribbean and Lego Cars 2 lines, it had for the first time in its 50-year history in the American market surpassed $1.0 billion in consumer sales of Lego products, reaching its highest share of construction toys and total U.S. toy market ever.

== See also ==
- Lego Avatar
- Lego The Simpsons
- Lego City
- Lego Racers
- Lego Speed Champions
- Lego Speed Racer
- Lego World Racers
- Lego Toy Story
- Lego Prince of Persia
- Lego Pirates of the Caribbean
- Lego The Lone Ranger
- Lego Disney
- Lego Trolls World Tour
