= Lego Spider-Man =

Lego theme

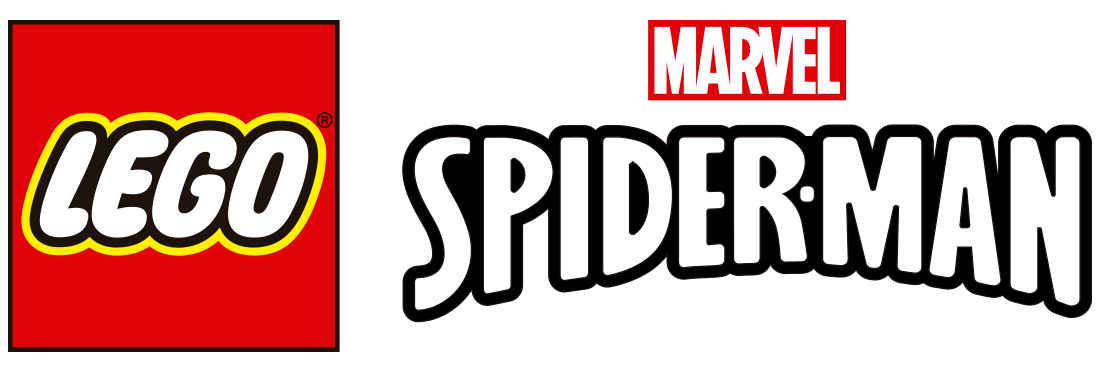
- Parent theme: Lego Studios (2002–2003); Lego Marvel Super Heroes (2012–present)
- Subject: Spider-Man
- Licensed from: Columbia Pictures (co-licensed from Marvel Comics); The Walt Disney Company
- Availability: 2002–2004 (original run); 2012–present
- Total sets: 14 (original run); 47 (current run)

Lego Spider-Man (stylized as LEGO Spider-Man) is a product range of the Lego construction toy, based on the Marvel Comics character Spider-Man. When the theme first launched in 2002, it was inspired by the Spider-Man film released the same year and was part of the Lego Studios line. Additional sets were released two years later, based on the film's sequel, Spider-Man 2. The theme was discontinued before the release of Spider-Man 3, and the rights were sold to rival Mega Brands, who entered a multi-year licensing deal with Marvel Enterprises, giving them the rights to produce playsets, vehicles, and other building-themed products based upon various Marvel characters for their Mega Bloks toys.

In 2012, Lego revived the theme, starting with several waves of sets based on the Ultimate Spider-Man animated series in their Marvel Super Heroes line. Starting with 2016, the theme was renamed simply Spider-Man. In 2017, 2019 and 2021, sets based on the films Spider-Man: Homecoming, Spider-Man: Far From Home, and Spider-Man: No Way Home, respectively, were released. A LEGO Spider-Man, voiced by Nic Novicki, was featured as a minor character in Spider-Man: Across the Spider-Verse.

== Overview ==
Lego Spider-Man was originally based on the original film, but now focuses on newer films and television shows. The product line focuses on Spider-Man battling against super villains in New York City. Lego Spider-Man aims to recreate the main characters in Lego form, including Spider-Man and his rogues gallery.

== Development ==
Lego Spider-Man sets are inspired by the mainlime Marvel Universe. The construction toy range was based on the Marvel franchise and developed in collaboration with Marvel Entertainment. While sometimes recreating events from storylines, the sets are most often playsets with no connection to any sense of timeline previously established in the Marvel Universe.

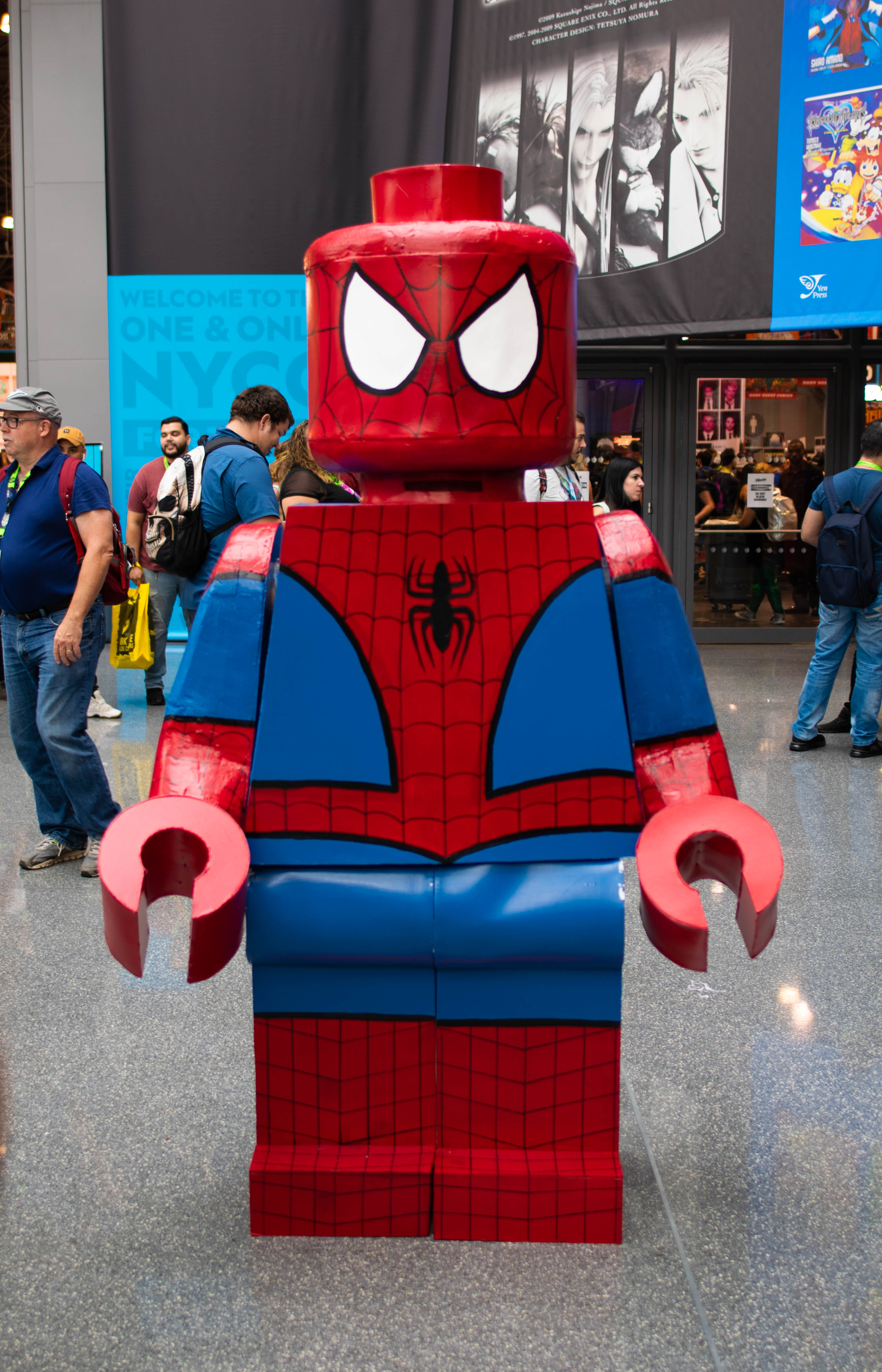
Cosplay of Spider-Man as a Lego minifigure.

== Construction sets ==
=== Original run (2002–2004) ===
According to BrickLink, The Lego Group released a total of 14 Lego sets and promotional polybags as part of Lego Spider-Man theme. It was discontinued by the end of 2004.

Spider-Man	Number	Released	Minifigures
Green Goblin	1374	2002	Green Goblin, Mary Jane Watson
Wrestling Scene	1375	2002	Spider-Man (Wrestling Suit), Bone Saw, Camera Man
Spider-Man Action Studio	1376	2002	Spider-Man, Robber, Director, Camera Man, Stunt-Man
Spider-Man Action Pack	10075	2002	Spider-Man, Peter Parker, Green Goblin, Mary Jane Watson, Police Officer, Director, Stunt-Man
Spider-Man's First Chase	4850	2003	Spider-Man (Wrestling Suit), Carjacker, Policeman
The Origins	4851	2003	Spider-Man, Peter Parker, Mary Jane Watson, Norman Osborn, Green Goblin, Scientist
The Final Showdown	4852	2003	Spider-Man, Mary Jane, Green Goblin, Taxi Driver
Spider-Man 2	Number	Released	Minifigures
Spider-Man's Street Chase	4853	2004	Spider-Man, Robber (x2)
Doc Ock's Bank Robbery	4854	2004	Spider-Man, Doc Ock, Aunt May, Police Man (x2)
Spider-Man's Train Rescue	4855	2004	Spider-Man, Doc Ock, J. Jonah Jameson, Train Driver
Doc Ock's Hideout	4856	2004	Spider-Man, Peter Parker, Doc Ock, Mary Jane Watson, Harry Osborn
Doc Ock's Fusion Lab	4857	2004	Spider-Man, Doc Ock, Harry Osborn, Ambulance Driver
Doc Ock's Crime Spree (Lego 4+)	4858	2004	Spider-Man, Doc Ock, Policeman
Doc Ock's Café Attack (Lego 4+)	4859	2004	Spider-Man, Peter Parker, Doc Ock

=== Lego 4+ ===
Two sets of Lego 4+ was released in May 2004 and based on Spider-Man 2 film, that was a larger piece version of the original Spider-Man 2 theme. It was also the only movie theme for the 4+ theme. The 2 sets being released were Doc Ock's Crime Spree (set number: 4858) and Doc Ock's Cafe Attack (set number: 4860).

- Doc Ock's Crime Spree (set number: 4858) was released on 1 May 2004. The set consists of 55 pieces with 3 minifigures. The set included Lego minifigures of Spider-Man, Doc Ock and Police Officer.
- Doc Ock's Cafe Attack (set number: 4860) was released on 1 May 2004. The set consists of 130 pieces with 3 minifigures. The set included Lego minifigures of Spider-Man, Doc Ock and Peter Parker.

=== Current run (2012–present) ===
==== Ultimate Spider-Man ====
6873 Spider-Man's Doc Ock Ambush, based on the Ultimate Spider-Man TV series, was released on 24 July 2012.

Two sets were released on 3 January 2013. They are 76004 Spider-Man: Spider-Cycle Chase, and 76005 Spider-Man: Daily Bugle Showdown.

Three sets were released on 18 February 2014. They are 76014 Spider-Trike vs. Electro, 76015 Doc Ock Truck Heist and 76016 Spider-Helicopter Rescue. In addition, a 30302 Spider-Man polybag was released as a promotion.

Two sets were released on 2 August 2015. They are 76036 Carnage's Shield Sky Attack, and 76037 Rhino and Sandman Super Villain Team-up. In addition, a 30305 Spider-Man Super Jumper polybag was released as a promotion.

In 2016, a 30448 Spider-Man vs. The Venom Symbiote polybag was released as a promotion.

==== The Amazing Spider-Man ====
For San Diego Comic-Con 2013, an exclusive Spider-Man minifigure based on The Amazing Spider-Man film was given away as an event exclusive.

In 2014, the polybag 5002125 Electro was released as a promotion, based on The Amazing Spider-Man 2 film.

==== Spider-Man ====
Three sets were released on 1 August 2016. They are 76057 Spider-Man: Web Warriors Ultimate Bridge Battle, 76058 Spider-Man: Ghost Rider Team-Up, and 76059 Spider-Man: Doc Ock's Tentacle Trap.

Five sets were released on 25 November 2018. They are 76113 Spider-Man Bike Rescue, 76114 Spider-Man's Spider Crawler, 76115 Spider Mech vs. Venom, 76133 Spider-Man Car Chase, and 76134 Spider-Man: Doc Ock Diamond Heist.

In 2019, a 30451 Spider-Man's Mini Spider Crawler polybag was released as a promotion.

Five sets were released on 2 January 2020. They are 76146 Spider-Man Mech, 76147 Vulture's Trucker Robbery, 76148 Spider-Man vs. Doc Ock, 76149 The Menace of Mysterio, and 76150 Spiderjet vs. Venom Mech. Later, two sets were released on 3 July 2020. They are 76151 Venomosaurus Ambush, and 76163 Venom Crawler.

Five sets were released on 2 January 2021. They are 76171 Miles Morales Mech Armor, 76172 Spider-Man and Sandman Showdown, 76173 Spider-Man and Ghost Rider vs. Carnage, 76174 Spider-Man's Monster Truck vs. Mysterio, and 76175 Attack on the Spider Lair.

Four sets were released subsequently in 2021. They are 40454 Spider-Man versus Venom and Iron Venom, 76187 Venom, 76198 Spider-Man & Doctor Octopus Mech Battle, and 76199 Carnage.

On 1 June 2021, the first Marvel Modular was released, 76178 Daily Bugle. It is currently the tallest of all licensed and unlicensed modular sets, measuring roughly 82 centimeters and is composed of 3772 bricks and pieces. This Lego set includes 25 minifigures, including but not limited to Spider-Man, J. Jonah Jameson, Doctor Octopus, and Daredevil. The Daily Bugle Skyscraper comprises four stories (not including the roof), a newspaper stand, a "Spider-Buggy", and a taxi. Rooms in the Daily Bugle depict a lobby, an editor's bullpen, a storage room, as well as Jameson's office, and Brant's secretarial desk. On one of the floors, there is a reference to a meme originating from Spider-Man (1967 TV series). Littered throughout the playset are newspapers referencing several Marvel characters, such as Norman Osborn, Morbius the Living Vampire, Kingpin, The Lizard, J Jonah Jameson III, and several more. This is one of the first modular buildings to include alleyways. The third story displays a window that is severely damaged caused by the Green Goblin.

==== Sets based on the Marvel Cinematic Universe Spider-Man films ====
Two sets based on the Spider-Man: Homecoming film were released on 2 June 2017. They are 76082 ATM Heist Battle, and 76083 Beware the Vulture.

Three sets based on the Spider-Man: Far From Home film were released on 22 April 2019. They are 76128 Molten Man Battle, 76129 Hydro-Man Attack, and 76130 Stark Jet and the Drone Attack. Later, an exclusive 40343 Spider-Man and the Museum Break-In set was released on 12 June 2019.

Three sets inspired by all three films from the trilogy were released in 2021 in conjunction with the Spider-Man: No Way Home film. They are 76184 Spider-Man vs. Mysterio's Drone Attack, 76185 Spider-Man at the Sanctum Workshop and 76195 Spider-Man's Drone Duel. A fourth set, 76261 Spider-Man Final Battle, was announced in May 2023 for an August release. 76261 includes the first minifigs based on Tobey Maguire's Spider-Man and Alfred Molina's Doc Ock manufactured since 2004, the first minifig of Willem Dafoe's Green Goblin since 2003, the second overall minifigs of Andrew Garfield's Spider-Man and Jamie Foxx's Electro since 2014, and the first overall appearance of Thomas Hayden Church's Sandman in LEGO form, represented by a buildable sand hand.

==== Marvel's Spider-Man ====
For San Diego Comic-Con 2019, PS4 Spider-Man was released as an event exclusive, based on the Spider-Man video game by Insomniac Games.

Produced as an exclusive for San Diego Comic-Con 2020, Classic Suit Miles Morales was released as part of a sweepstakes in October 2020, based on the Spider-Man: Miles Morales video game by Insomniac Games.

=== Lego Art ===
The Amazing Spider-Man (set number: 31209) was released on 1 August 2023 as a part of Lego Art and based on The Amazing Spider-Man. It consists of 2,099 pieces. The accompanying soundtrack includes interviews with Marvel Senior Editors Tom Brevoort and Nick Lowe.

== Film and television ==
=== Lego Marvel Super Heroes: Maximum Overload (2013) ===
Lego Marvel Super Heroes: Maximum Overload (also known as Marvel Super Heroes: Maximum Overload) is an animated Lego film based on Marvel Comics characters that were also featured in Lego Marvel Super Heroes. It premiered online in five parts on November 5, 2013. The film can also be viewed on Netflix and Amazon Video being free with Amazon Prime.

=== Lego Marvel Super Heroes: Avengers Reassembled (2015) ===
Lego Marvel Super Heroes: Avengers Reassembled is an animated Lego film based on Marvel Comics characters that appeared in Lego Marvel Super Heroes and Lego Marvel's Avengers. It is a re-imagined retelling of Avengers: Age of Ultron while using some elements from Ant-Man and Spider-Man. The film first aired on Disney XD. It is available to watch at Lego.com.

=== Lego Marvel Spider-Man: Vexed by Venom (2019) ===
Lego Marvel Spider-Man: Vexed by Venom is an animated Lego film based on Marvel Comics and starring Spider-Man. Premiered on YouTube and Disney XD.

=== Lego Marvel Avengers: Climate Conundrum (2020) ===
Lego Marvel Avengers: Climate Conundrum is a four-part animated Lego film based on Marvel Comics and starring The Avengers. Premiered on YouTube and Disney XD.

=== Spider-Man: Across the Spider-Verse (2023) ===
A LEGO Peter Parker / Spider-Man appears briefly in the 2023 animated superhero film Spider-Man: Across the Spider-Verse, voiced by Nic Novicki. In the film, LEGO Peter is working for J. Jonah Jameson at the Daily Bugle. The Spot suddenly appears in his universe and he then immediately contacts and alerts Miguel O'Hara / Spider-Man 2099 about the circumstance and is later assigned by Jess Drew / Spider-Woman to a team to aid in dealing with the Spot situation. The sequence was animated by the 14-year-old Preston Mutanga, who attracted attention from the filmmakers after he published a re-animated version of the movie's trailer in a Lego style, which he made in Blender.

=== Lego Marvel Avengers: Strange Tails (2025) ===
A two-part animated Lego film based on Marvel Comics and starring The Avengers. Premiered on Disney+. The special features Benjamin Valic as Peter Parker, reprising his role from Spidey & His Amazing Friends.

== Video games ==
=== Lego Marvel Super Heroes ===
A video game based on the Lego Marvel Super Heroes line, titled Lego Marvel Super Heroes was released in October 2013. Originally, a Lego Avengers game was set to be made, but the developers felt that just being able to play as the Avengers was not enough, and thus decided to add other Marvel heroes. The game was released on iOS, personal computer, PlayStation 3, PlayStation 4, PlayStation Vita, Nintendo DS, Nintendo 3DS, Wii U, Xbox 360, Xbox One and published by Feral Interactive for OS X.

=== Lego Marvel's Avengers ===
A second standalone video game featuring the Lego Marvel Super Heroes line, separate from the first game, titled Lego Marvel's Avengers was released on January 26, 2016. It follows the plots of the two Avengers movies, The Avengers and Avengers: Age of Ultron. It was released on personal computer, PlayStation 3, PlayStation 4, PlayStation Vita, Nintendo 3DS, Wii U, Xbox 360 and Xbox One.

=== Lego Marvel Super Heroes 2 ===
The third game featuring the Lego Marvel Super Heroes line, titled Lego Marvel Super Heroes 2 was released on November 14, 2017, as a direct sequel to the original Lego Marvel Super Heroes. However, it is not related to the standalone game Lego Marvel's Avengers.

== See also ==
- Lego 4+
- Lego Studios
- Lego Batman
- Lego Super Heroes
- Lego Minifigures (theme)
