= Lego World Racers =

Lego theme

- Availability: 2010–2010
- Total sets: 9
- Characters: Dex-streme, Rex-streme, Max-streme, Bubba Blaster, Bart Blaster, Billy Bob Blaster
- Official website

Lego World Racers is a discontinued Lego theme that centred around two racing teams competing to win the world cup. The first six sets were released in May and June 2010, with an additional three sets being released later in 2010. The theme was discontinued in the same year.

== Story ==
Lego World Racers was based on a storyline that focused on two racing teams named the Backyard Blasters and the X-Treme Daredevils that compete in races across the world to win the world cup. The Lego minifigures in the X-treme Daredevils' team were Dex-treme, Rex-treme, and Max-treme. The minifigures in the Backyard Blasters' team were Bubba, Bart, and Billy Bob Blaster.

== Construction sets ==
The first World Racers sets were released during the end of May and the start of June, 2010. Blizzard's Peak was a 504-piece set with an age rating of 8–14 and was marked as Race 5 in the theme. The set features included two Arctic racers, a helicopter, snowmobile, and six minifigures. The minifigures included three members of the Backyard Blaster team – Bart Blaster, Billy Bob Blaster, Bubba Blaster, two members of the X-Treme Daredevils team – Max-treme and Dex-treme, and one race official. Desert of Destruction was a 961-piece set with an age rating of 8–14 and was marked as Race 6 in the theme. The set features included the X-treme Daredevils team truck that was around 53 cm (21"), a desert rally racer, a desert buggy racer, and eight minifigures. The minifigures included five members of the X-treme Daredevils – Rex-treme, Dex-treme, Max-treme and two crewmembers, two members of the Backyard Blasters – Bart Blaster and Bubba Blaster, and a race official. Snake Canyon was a 57-piece set with an age rating of 7–14 and was marked as Race 1. The set features included two off-road motorcycles, a winners platform and two minifigures - Rex-treme and Bart Blaster.

Jagged Jaws Reef was a 191-piece set with an age rating of 7–14 and was marked as Race 2. The set featured two 15 cm (6") long race boats, a shark and two minifigures - Rex-treme and Bart Blaster Wreckage Road was a 292-piece set with an age rating of 7–14 and was marked as Race 3. The set featured two 15 cm (6") long race cars, a start/finish gateway, and four minifigures. The minifigures included two members of the X-treme Daredevils - Max-treme and Rex-treme, and two members of the Backyard Blasters - Bart Blaster and Billy Bob Blaster. Gator Swamp was a 354-piece set with an age rating of 7–14 and was marked as Race 4. The features included two 15 cm (6") long hovercraft racers, a gator, a dock and minifigures. The minifigures included two members of the Backyard Blasters - Billy Bob Blaster and Bubba Blaster, two members of the X-treme Daredevils - Rex-treme and Dex-treme, and a race official.

Later in 2010 three promotional sets were released. World Race Powerboat was a 27-piece set marked as Race 9. It featured a small powerboat and the minifigure Rex-treme. World Race Buggy was a 35-piece set marked as Race 8. It featured a small buggy and the minifigure Bart Blaster. Rocket Kit was a 26-piece set marked as Race 6. It featured four dynamite pieces and eight brick-built rockets.

Set No.	Set	Release	Pieces	Minifigures	Ref.
8863	Blizzard's Peak	June 1, 2010	504	6	
8864	Desert of Destruction	May 29, 2010	961	8	
8896	Snake Canyon	June 1, 2010	57	2	
8897	Jagged Jaws Reef	June 1, 2010	191	2	
8898	Wreckage Road	June 1, 2010	292	4	
8899	Gator Swamp	May 30, 2010	354	5	
30031	World Race Powerboat	2010	27	1	
30032	World Race Buggy	2010	35	1	
4595400	Rocket Kit	2010	26	—	

== See also ==
- Lego City
- Lego Fusion
- Lego Speed Champions
- Lego Speed Racer
- Lego Racers
- Lego Cars
