= Lego Pirates =

Theme of LEGO toy bricks, 1989–2015

- Logo for the 2009–2010 wave
- Sub‑themes: Pirates; Imperial Soldiers; Imperial Guards; Imperial Armada; Islanders
- Subject: Pirates
- Availability: 1989–2015
- Total sets: 71

Lego Pirates is a discontinued Lego theme launched in 1989 featuring pirates, soldiers from the Napoleonic Wars, Pacific Islanders, sailing ships, and buried treasure, inspired by the late Golden Age of Piracy. The theme has been seen in the Lego System (minifigure scale, typically age 6–12), Duplo and the 4+ themes.

== History ==
A custom LEGO pirate minifigure, modified from Captain Redbeard

Created by a small team led by designer Niels Milan Pedersen, Lego Pirates was the company's fourth minifgure-based theme after Space, Castle, and Town, and it was much more complex. Numerous new pieces were also created including firearms (the first LEGO series to include them), wildlife (parrots, sharks, monkeys), and cloth sails. Lego Pirates minifigures were the first to go beyond the traditional head with simply two dots for eyes and a smile, as many of them had a variety of different printed features including eyepatches, facial hair, and feminine makeup, though in the early years all still featured the smiley face as their base. Only a few minifigures in Lego Pirates used the traditional face of two eyes and a smile: the soldier/trooper of the Imperial Soldiers and Imperial Guards, the Imperial Soldiers sailor/marine (only found in 6274 Caribbean Clipper), and young pirate Bo'Sun Will. Prior to the launch of Lego Pirates, minifigures were distinguished in function and organization by their torso, headgear (either a helmet or hair), and accessories, being generic roles without any specified character.

In Lego's first attempt to establish a narrative and encourage role-playing, personalities were created for several of the Lego Pirates minifigures. Story suggestions were printed on boxes, particularly for the USA market where the larger sets had a flap that opened up to display the contents. In a first for Lego, television ads used stop-motion animation. A comic book entitled "The Gold Medallion" was also released in that year, as well as a Ladybird Book series. The storyline takes place in the 18th century, where pirates had been searching for buried treasure as the doubloons (Spanish gold coins) belonged to their ancestors, however a colony of settlers discovered the treasure first and claimed it, leading to conflict. The Governor of the colony was forced to fortify the settlements and attempted to hide the treasure in his main fortress. Audio tapes containing more lore were released in German, with 6 being for the first wave, and 2 more being for the 1994 and 1995 waves. These tapes were rereleased with new art in 2004.

The Pirates were led by Captain Redbeard (originally called Captain Roger in some markets), distinguished by his black bicorne hat, left eye patch, peg leg on the right and a hook where his left hand was; his crew included First Mate Rummy, Flashfork the cook, and the young Bo'Sun Will. Another pirate leader was Captain Ironhook who has been suggested as a rival to Redbeard; both minifigures were similar except that Ironhook had a tattered shirt (some releases of Ironhook have a peg leg). Their emblem was the Jolly Roger, a black flag featuring the skull and crossbones. 6285 Black Seas Barracuda was their first pirate ship while 6270 Forbidden Island was their original hideout, both released in 1989. The catalogue releases for the Pirates expanded considerably with a larger base, 6273 Rock Island Refuge (1991), and then a pair of pirate ships in 1993 (the large 6286 Skull's Eye Schooner and small 6268 Renegade Runner).

Opposing the Pirates were the Imperials. The Imperials were split into three factions, all enlisted united under The King. The first is the Imperial Soldiers led by Governor Broadside and his second-in-command Lieutenant de Martinet. These blue-coated forces were based upon the French navy and marines of the colonial era and Napoleonic Wars, being known Imperial Soldiers in certain catalogues worldwide, though explicitly identified as "Governors" on page 16 of the 1990 American catalog. The Imperial Soldiers were superseded in 1992 by the red-coated Imperial Guards led by Admiral Woodside (with 6274 Caribbean Clipper and 6276 Eldorado Fortress being replaced by 6271 Imperial Flagship and 6277 Imperial Trading Post, respectively, as the Imperials' sailing ship and main base). The Soldiers and Guards minifigures were very similar save for a Palette swap of uniforms and facial expressions. Both the Imperial Soldiers and the Imperial Guards used two crossed cannons under a crown as their emblem, though the Soldiers' blue flag was similar to the Flag of Quebec while the Guards had three thick red horizontal stripes. The Imperial Guards were reintroduced in 2009–10, and the Imperial Soldiers were reintroduced in 2015; the Guards and Soldiers were the respective government opponents of the Pirates during the brief periods of Lego Pirates revival. in 1996, Lego introduced the Imperial Armada, only having two sets specifically for them, being 6280 Armada Flagship and 6244 Armada Sentry. They appeared in 4 other sets, 6281 Pirates Perilous Pitfall, 6204 Buccaneers, 6296 Shipwreck Island, and 6249 Pirates Ambush.

A new faction loosely based on a Polynesian concept, the Islanders, was released for 1994. This resulted in Lego having three factions in 1994 and 1995, with the Pirates battling the Imperial Guard on the high seas and disturbing the Islanders while seeking treasure. However, in 1995 Lego discontinued all of the previously released Imperial Guards sets from 1992 to 1993 (particularly their larger sets, the 6271 Imperial Flagship and 6277 Imperial Trading Post), making the new release 6263 Imperial Outpost the sole Imperial Guards set, which essentially made the year a Pirates versus Islanders conflict.

For 1996 Lego changed the entire "feel" of the Pirates line, giving the Pirates minifigs new faces, and made it Spanish-influenced. The entire original design team was replaced, thus leading to different build styles than the previous lines. The Imperial Guards were replaced by the Imperial Armada (heavily influenced by the Spanish Armada), though the Guards' 6263 Imperial Outpost remained available in 1996 as a medium land base for Imperial side, as ending up only two sets were released for the Armada including the 6280 Armada Flagship (although Armada minifigures were guests in new sets of the Pirates faction). 1996 was also the last year for the Islanders who had not seen any new releases since 1994, but they did appear in 1788 Treasure Chest attacking Captain Ironhook's outpost in 1995. 1997 featured just the Pirates versus the Imperial Armada; however some of the new releases like 6250 Cross Bone Clipper and 6281 Pirates Perilous Pitfalls were not well received and this turned out to be the final year of the original Lego Pirates run.

After 1997, Lego discontinued the Pirates theme to the shock of fans, because the Pirates line had always been a big seller. The original releases (1989–91) retrospectively were most nostalgic among Lego Pirates fans due to the sets' design and meticulous detail, which was sacrificed in subsequent releases for increased playability, which drew a mixed reception. For instance the 6286 Skull's Eye Schooner (1993), which succeeded 6285 Black Seas Barracuda (1989) as the main Pirates ship set, implemented a mechanism for the ship's wheel to control the rudder which necessitated a smaller and less detailed aft cabin, plus the Skull's Eye Schooner's cannons are attached to rotating turntables on sliders instead of the more realistic placement of cannons upon wheeled naval carriages like earlier Lego Pirates ship sets. 6289 Red Beard Runner (1996), which replaced 6286, drew criticism for "battle damage" features like the tumbling forward mast and collapsing quarterdeck as these made the assembled set unstable. The changes to Lego's set design direction, not just in Lego Pirates but also across their other product lines, have been attributed to the Lego Group's retiring of many LEGO Designers who had created the sets from the late 1970s to the early 1990s, replacing them with 30 'innovators' who graduated from the European design colleges around Europe who knew "little specifically about toy design and less about LEGO building".

The Pirates theme was brought to 4+ for 2004 and Duplo for 2006.

Lego reintroduced Pirates and Imperial Guards in minifigure scale for 2009, including the pirate ship 6243 Brickbeard's Bounty, just in time for the theme's 20th anniversary. 6243 Brickbeard's Bounty uses identical bow pieces for the front and rear of the ship's hull, in contrast to earlier Lego Pirates ships which each had unique bow and stern hull pieces. However, there was only one more set released the following year, the 10210 Imperial Flagship (2010) which was the largest vessel in Lego Pirates ever released. After 2010, the revived Lego Pirates theme was discontinued in order to make room for a series of licensed products, Lego Pirates of the Caribbean, based on the film series of the same name.

In 2015, Lego again briefly reintroduced the theme with Pirates and Imperial Soldiers, including the pirate ship 70413 The Brick Bounty (inspired by the earlier 6243 Brickbeard's Bounty and 6285 Black Seas Barracuda). The 70413 The Brick Bounty has a rear cabin built directly onto the rearmost hull piece which is a middle hull piece section (there is no longer unique stern hull piece).

2020 saw the release of the 30th Lego Ideas set 21322 Pirates of Barracuda Bay, which can be built either as a pirate shipwreck on an island or the pirate ship (inspired by 6285 Black Seas Barracuda) due to its modular design.

2023 saw the release of a new Lego ICONS set 10320 Eldorado Fortress, which is a brick built redesign of the 1989 set (6276) and due to its modular design can be reconfigured for maximum play value.

== Set list ==
Diorama from a 1989 LEGO catalog depicting a battle between the Pirates and Imperial Soldiers, featuring the 6285 Black Seas Barracuda (left) and 6276 Eldorado Fortress

Two 1996 Pirate sets, "Red Beard Runner" and "Armada Flagship", and one 1994 Islanders set, "Enchanted Island", were re-released for 2001.

6276 Eldorado Fortress remains a classic for its design and innovation was re-released as 10320 Eldorado Fortress (2023) as part of the Lego Icons series. Being considered the benchmark for Lego pirate ships, the 6285 Black Seas Barracuda (1989) was re-released as 10040 Black Seas Barracuda (2002) as part of the Lego Legends series. The Black Seas Barracuda was also the inspiration for the 30th Lego Ideas set 21322 Pirates of Barracuda Bay, released in 2020, which can be built either as a pirate shipwreck on an island or the pirate ship due to its modular design.

The 10210 Imperial Flagship (2010) of the Imperial Guards faction is the largest ship in Lego Pirates ever released, exceeding that of the 6286 Skull's Eye Schooner (1993). This ended a long running gag in Lego Pirates where the previous three Imperials' flagships were smaller than contemporary pirate ships; traditionally the pirate ship was also the largest and most expensive set of its era in Lego Pirates.

== Official merchandise ==
The Lego Group has also released a variety of official Pirate Lego merchandise ranging from clothing to stick-on tattoos to board games.

== Ladybird Books series ==
An official series of children's books based on the Pirate Lego theme was published by Ladybird Books in 1990.

1. Will and the Gold Chase
2. Captain Roger's Birthday
3. Adventure on Shark Island
4. The Royal Visit

== Theme park attraction ==
In 1999, a Lego Pirates-themed land was introduced to Legoland California, based on the Lego Pirates toy theme. The area featuring Pirate Shores is a splash park with water-oriented rides and attractions. This area was added in 2006, and Captain Cranky's Challenge was added in May 2007. Also included Pirate Reef, Soak n' Sail, Splash Battle and Swabbie's Deck.

In 2002, a Lego Pirates-themed land was introduced to Legoland Deutschland Resort, based on the Lego Pirates toy theme. The area features Captain Nick's Splash Battle, Pirates School and Pirates’ Playground.

In 2011, a Lego Pirates-themed land was introduced to Legoland Florida, based on the Lego Pirates toy theme. The area featured Pirates' Cove and also included The Battle For Brickbeard's Bounty.

In 2021, a Lego Pirates-themed land was introduced to Legoland New York, based on the Lego Pirates toy theme. The area features Anchors Away, Rogue Riders and Splash Battle.

In 2022, a Lego Pirates-themed land was introduced to Legoland Discovery Centre in Birmingham and Manchester, based on the Lego Pirates toy theme. Legoland Florida also included Pirate River Quest, a new pirate-themed ride.

== See also ==
- Lego Pirates of the Caribbean
- Lego Brawls
- Lego One Piece
