= Lego Juniors =

Product range of the Lego construction toy

- Sub‑themes: Cars 3; City; DC Comics; Disney Princess; Friends; Jurassic World: Fallen Kingdom; Marvel Comics; Ninjago; The Lego Ninjago Movie; Teenage Mutant Ninja Turtles (2012 TV series); Incredibles 2
- Subject: Easy to build
- Licensed from: Various
- Availability: February 14, 2014–December 31, 2018
- Total sets: 67 (including promotional sets)
- Official website

Lego Juniors (also known as Lego Jr.) is a discontinued product range of the construction toy Lego, designed for children aged 4 to 7 years old. It acted as a transition from the Duplo to the regular Lego System. Lego Juniors initial release was on February 14, 2014, with the tagline Easy to build. It was the successor to the Bricks & More line released in 2009. Unlike its predecessor, Lego Juniors offered specialized bricks to make builds look more realistic while using fewer pieces for an easier build. The product line was discontinued by December 31, 2018 and rebranded as "4+" in 2019.

== Overview ==
Each of the sets featured a small number of larger pieces, in order to be easy to build. The toy sets were marketed at children aged 4–7.

== Development ==
Lego Juniors theme aimed to provide children to gain confidence, whether they are transitioning from Duplo or just starting to build with classic Lego bricks. Michelle Wilson, senior brand manager, LEGO Systems, Inc. said, "We know that construction play benefits young children on multiple dimensions nurturing cognitive and motor skills along with developing social, emotional and imaginative skills; we're thrilled to offer a new line to make it even easier for children to have a great first experience building."

== Launch ==
Lego Juniors theme was launched at the American International Toy Fair in February 2014. As part of the marketing campaign, The Lego Group released thirteen Lego Juniors sets of a variety of sub-themes.

== Construction sets ==
According to BrickLink, The Lego Group released 67 playsets and promotional polybags as part of the Lego Juniors. The product line was eventually discontinued by December 31, 2018.

=== Marvel Super Heroes (2014-2018 sets) ===
In 2014, Spider-Man: Spider-Car Pursuit (set number: 10665) was released on 18 February 2014. The set consists of 55 pieces with 2 minifigures. The set included Spider-Man and Venom.

In 2015, Spider-Man Hideout (set number: 10687) was released on 18 May 2015. The set consists of 136 pieces with 3 minifigures. The set included Spider-Man, Police Officer and Green Goblin.

In 2016, Iron Man vs. Loki (set number: 10721) was released on 1 March 2016. The set consists of 66 pieces with 2 minifigures. The set included Iron Man and Loki.

In 2018, Spider-Man vs. Scorpion Street Showdown (set number: 10754) was released on 1 January 2018. The set consists of 125 pieces with 2 minifigures. The set included Spider-Man and Scorpion.

=== DC Super Heroes (2014-2018 sets) ===
In 2014, Batman: Defend the Batcave (set number: 10672) was released on 18 February 2014. The set consists of 150 pieces with 3 minifigures. The set included Batman, Robin and The Joker.

In 2016, Batman & Superman vs. Lex Luthor (set number: 10724) The set consists of 150 pieces with 3 minifigures. The set included Batman, Robin and The Joker. was released on 22 May 2016.

In 2017, Batman vs. Mr. Freeze (set number: 10737) was released on 2 January 2017. The set consists of 63 pieces with 2 minifigures. The set included Batman and Mr. Freeze.

In 2018, The Joker Batcave Attack (set number: 10753) was released on 1 January 2018. The set consists of 151 pieces with 3 minifigures. The set included Batman, Robin and The Joker.

=== City (2014-2018 sets) ===
In 2014, the three sets were released on 18 February 2014. The three sets being released were Pizza Shop (set number: 10666), Construction (set number: 10667), The Princess Play Castle (set number: 10668), Race Car Rally (set number: 10673), Pony Farm (set number: 10674) and Police – The Big Escape (set number: 10675). Later, Knights' Castle (set number: 10676) was released on 27 May 2014 and Fire Emergency (set number: 10671) was released on 24 October 2014.

In 2015, the five sets were released on 1 March 2015. The five sets being released were Beach Trip (set number: 10677), Pirate Treasure Hunt (set number: 10679)', Garbage Truck (set number: 10680), Supermarket Suitcase (set number: 10684) and Fire Suitcase (set number: 10685). Later, Family House (set number: 10686) was released on 18 May 2015.

In 2016, Police Helicopter Chase (set number: 10720) was released on 1 March 2016. In addition, Racer (set number: 30473) polybag set was released as a promotion.

In 2017, the two sets were released on 27 November 2016. The two sets being released were Demolition Site (set number: 10734) and Police Truck Chase (set number: 10735). Later, Fire Patrol Suitcase (set number: 10740) was released on 27 November 2016. In addition, Fire Car (set number: 30338) polybag set was released as a promotion. Later, Road Repair Truck (set number: 10750) and Mountain Police Chase (set number: 10751) was released on 26 November 2017.

In 2018, City Central Airport (set number: 10764) was released on 2 June 2018. In addition, Traffic Light Patrol (set number: 30339) polybag set was released as a promotion.

=== Ninjago (2016-2018 sets) ===
In 2016, the two sets were released on 1 March 2016. The two sets being released were Snake Showdown (set number: 10722) and Lost Temple (set number: 10725).

In 2017, Shark Attack (set number: 10739) was released on 1 August 2017. The set consists of 108 pieces with 3 minifigures. The set included Kai, Lloyd Garmadon and Shark Army Great White.

In 2018, Zane's Ninja Boat Pursuit (set number: 10755) was released on 1 January 2018. The set consists of 131 pieces with 2 minifigures. The set included Chopper Maroon and Zane.

=== Teenage Mutant Ninja Turtles (2014 set) ===
In 2014, Turtle Lair (set number: 10669) was released on 27 May 2014. The set consists of 107 pieces with 2 minifigures. The set included Foot Soldier and Leonardo.

=== Disney Princess (2016-2018 sets) ===
In 2016, the two sets was released on 1 March 2016. The two sets being released were Ariel's Dolphin Carriage (set number: 10723) and Cinderella's Carriage (set number: 10729).

In 2017, Anna and Elsa's Frozen Playground (set number: 10736) was released on 2 January 2017. Later, Snow White's Forest Cottage (set number: 10738) was released on 1 August 2017.

In 2018, Belle's Story Time (set number: 10762) was released on 2 June 2018. Later, Ariel's Underwater Concert (set number: 10765) was released on 1 August 2018.

=== Friends (2016-2018 sets) ===
In 2016, the three sets would be released on 22 May 2016. The three sets being release were Stephanie's Car (set number: 10726), Emma's Ice Cream Truck (set number: 10727) and Mia's Vet Clinic (set number: 10728).

In 2017, the two sets were released on 2 January 2017. The four sets being released were Mia's Farm Suitcase (set number: 10746) and Andrea and Stephanie's Beach Holiday (set number: 10747).

In 2018, the two sets were released on 26 November 2018. The two sets being released were Emma's Pet Party (set number: 10748) and Mia's Organic Food Market (set number: 10749). Later, Stephanie's Lakeside House (set number: 10763) was released on 2 June 2018.

=== Cars 3 (2017 sets) ===
In 2017, the seven sets based on the Cars 3 film was released on 2 May 2017. The seven sets being released were Lightning McQueen Speed Launcher (set number: 10730), Cruz Ramirez Race Simulator (set number: 10731), Guido and Luigi's Pit Stop (set number: 10732), Mater's Junkyard (set number: 10733), Willy's Butte Speed Training (set number: 10742), Smokey's Garage (set number: 10743) and Thunder Hollow Crazy 8 Race (set number: 10744). Later, Florida 500 Final Race (set number: 10745) was released on 1 August 2017.

=== Jurassic World: Fallen Kingdom (2018 sets) ===
In 2018, the three sets based on the Jurassic World: Fallen Kingdom film was released on 17 April 2018. The three sets being released were Pteranodon Escape (set number: 10756), Raptor Rescue Truck (set number: 10757) and T. Rex Breakout (set number: 10758).

=== Incredibles 2 (2018 sets) ===
In 2018, the three sets based on the Incredibles 2 film was released on 21 April 2018. The three sets being released were Elastigirl's Rooftop Pursuit (set number: 10759), Underminer's Bank Heist (set number: 10760) and The Great Home Escape (set number: 10761). In addition, Edna Mode (set number: 30615) polybag set was released as a promotion. Each of the sets featured five core characters, named Mr. Incredible, Mrs. Incredible, Violet Parr, Dashiell 'Dash' Parr and Jack-Jack.

== Video games ==
A mobile game based on the theme, Lego Juniors Create & Cruise, was available from 2014 to 2019. It was previously known as Lego App4+ and initially released in 2012. Another game, Lego Juniors Quest, was released around 2014.

== Retirement of branding ==
On October 22, 2018, The Lego Group announced that they would be retiring the "Lego Juniors" branding on December 31, 2018 and replacing it with "4+" in 2019. The Lego Group cited the reason as to make it easier for children to see which sets were meant for their age range. The Lego Juniors theme remains, however, boxes do not feature the logo and feature an all-colors design.

== Awards and nominations ==
In 2015, Lego Juniors was awarded "Toy of the Year" and also "Preschool Toy of the Year" by the Toy Association.

== See also ==
- Cars 3
- City
- DC
- Disney Princess
- Friends
- Jurassic World: Fallen Kingdom
- Marvel Comics
- Ninjago
- The Lego Ninjago Movie
- Teenage Mutant Ninja Turtles
- Incredibles 2
