= List of cancelled Lego media =

The Lego Group is a Danish toy company that has produced many products based on original and licensed properties. The following is a list of products that were unproduced or unreleased cancelled media.

== Sets ==
=== 1996 ===
==== Lego Town ====
===== 6500 LEGO Holiday village =====
A set featuring a town city center with several buildings was planned for release in 1996 and appeared in some toy catalogs, but it was never released for unknown reasons.

=== 2002 ===
==== Lego Studios ====
===== 1375 Wrestling scene =====
A set based on the wrestling scene from Spider-Man was planned but was never released for unknown reasons. Some fans have theorized that issues with Bonesaw's actor “Macho Man” Randy Savage may have prevented the set's release.

=== 2012 ===
==== Lego Games ====
===== 3868 Phineas and Ferb =====
A Phineas and Ferb themed board game was originally intended to release in 2012 as part of the Lego Games theme but went unreleased for unknown reasons. The building instructions for the set later leaked online in 2013.

===== 3867 Maya Mystica =====
A mayan themed board game was originally intended to release in 2012 as part of the Lego Games theme but went unreleased for unknown reasons. Little is known outside of a leaked image of the set's box.

=== 2018 ===
==== Lego BrickHeadz ====
===== 40316 Geoffrey =====
A BrickHeadz build of Toys 'R' Us's mascot, Geoffrey the Giraffe, was planned as a store exclusive for release in 2018 but went unreleased due to the company's bankruptcy. The building instructions were briefly made officially available online but have since been removed.

==== Lego Architecture ====
===== 21038 Las Vegas skyline =====
An architecture set based on the Las Vegas skyline was planned for release in January 2018. Following the 2017 Las Vegas Shooting, the set was canceled with an alternate version replacing the Mandalay Hotel with the Bellagio releasing on 1 September 2018, instead.

=== 2020 ===
==== Lego Technic ====
===== 42113: Bell-Boeing V-22 Osprey =====
On 21 July 2020, ten days before its release, The Lego Group recalled a Lego Technic set based on the Bell Boeing V-22 Osprey. In response, The Lego Group cited conflicts with their brand values and pressure from external groups, including peace activists who protested the set as the reasons for the cancellation, stating:

"The LEGO Technic Bell Boeing V-22 Osprey was designed to highlight the important role the aircraft plays in search and rescue efforts. While the set clearly depicts how a rescue version of the plane might look, the aircraft is only used by the military. We have a long-standing policy not to create sets which feature real military vehicles, so it has been decided not to proceed with the launch of this product. We appreciate that some fans who were looking forward to this set may be disappointed, but we believe it's important to ensure that we uphold our brand values."

— The Lego Group

=== 2021 ===
==== Lego City ====
===== 60278: Crook's hideout raid =====
In 2021 a Lego City set was leaked in an advertisement from a Lego Friends instruction manual, depicting a brick building with features such as a brick-built dynamite stick prop on the top of it, as well as a cartoonish bomb print with an exaggerated facial expression to the left side. The building is assumed to be depicting a dynamite factory, with crook minifigures being seen robbing it, and a police helicopter also being included seen hovering over it.

On 23 March the fan blog Brick Fanatics confirmed that after reaching out to The Lego Group for a comment, Lego had confirmed to them they had decided to cancel plans to release the set, clarifying that it went against their brand values and had also provided this statement on behalf of their decision:

"With LEGO CITY, we always aim to represent the reality of the world in a way that is fun, positive and appropriate for kids", the CITY team stated. "With this in mind, we have decided not to launch this product as we no longer feel it is in keeping with the values of the LEGO CITY brand".

— The Lego Group

===== 40489 Mr and Mrs Claus’ living room =====
In 2021, The Lego Group recalled a mini build last minute featuring Santa and Mrs Claus that was intended as a Black Friday bonus, claiming it did not meet their quality standards. Some fans have speculated that the inclusion of Santa's "naughty list" may have been the cause.

=== 2022 ===
==== Lego Overwatch ====
===== 76980: Titan =====
In December 2021, The Lego Group announced a set based on Overwatch 2 titled Titan, which was scheduled for release in February 2022. On 11 January 2022, The Lego Group announced that the release had been delayed indefinitely while the company reviewed its partnership with Activision Blizzard, following a workplace misconduct lawsuit filed by the California Department of Fair Employment and Housing (DFEH). As of 2025, there have been no updates regarding the potential release of the set or the continuation of the Lego Overwatch theme.

=== 2023 ===
==== Lego Super Heroes ====
===== 76221 Batmobile: Flash Tracking =====
In May 2022, images of a set intended as a tie-in for The Flash were leaked online, featuring a build of the Batmobile with minifigures of Batman, The Flash and Supergirl. The set was never released, likely due to controversy surrounding the film's main star, Ezra Miller.

==== Lego Games ====
===== 30629: Finnius Dash =====
In December 2022, the fan site Brick Fanatics reported that a polybag featuring a minifigure in a football uniform, seemingly intended as a tie-in for the rumored game LEGO 2K Goooal!, had been discovered on LEGO.com's Certifications and Policies page. While other sites have listed the figure, no further information about its release has surfaced, suggesting it may have been quietly cancelled alongside the game.

==== Lego Indiana Jones ====
===== 77014 The Temple of Doom =====
In February 2023, four Indiana Jones–themed sets based on Raiders of the Lost Ark, The Last Crusade, and Temple of Doom were leaked online. However, a month later when the sets were officially announced, the Temple of Doom set was removed from the lineup. In response, The Lego Group indirectly confirmed the set had been canceled, stating:

"Throughout 2022, the LEGO Group worked closely with Lucasfilm to optimize our planned product lineup for the upcoming LEGO Indiana Jones product launches in April 2023. As an outcome of this, we consolidated the launch to focus on three products (77012, 77013, 77015) that feature some of the most iconic scenes from the Indiana Jones franchise."

— The Lego Group

== Video games ==
=== 1997 ===
==== Lego Sea Challenge ====
During development on Lego Island, Mindscape had created a bespoke game engine that they intended to reuse for potential sequels and spin-offs. The first of these follow-ups was a spin-off titled Lego Sea Challenge (also known as Beneath the LEGO Phanta Sea). According to Lego Island's senior producer, Scott Anderson, the game was going to feature "submarines & divers trying to stop a Brickster-type character from upsetting 5-7 different underwater ecologies."

Lego Sea Challenge was canceled shortly after Lego Island's release, following a distribution dispute that caused Mindscape to lose the Lego license.

==== Lego Adventurers ====
Another planned follow-up to Lego Island from Mindscape was Lego Adventurers, (also known as Lego Dig and Lego Explorers). The game would have seen Pepper Roni and the Infomaniac from Lego Island, along with some new characters, exploring the Lost City of OGEL for ancient artifacts.

Similar to Lego Sea Challenge, the project was canceled when Mindscape lost the Lego license, shortly after Lego Island's release.

==== Untitled Lego Castle game ====
Before Mindscape ended their partnership with the Lego Group, they had begun exploring ideas for a game based on the Castle theme. It is unknown how far development progressed, if at all, as the only materials discovered from the game are a design document and a single concept sketch. Similar to Lego Sea Challenge, the project was canceled when Mindscape lost the Lego license, shortly after Lego Island's release.

==== Lego Space: UFO Invaders ====
Another canceled Mindscape project was a space-inspired game titled Lego Space: UFO Invaders. Similar to Lego Sea Challenge, the project was canceled when Mindscape lost the Lego license, shortly after Lego Island's release.

==== Untitled Technic game ====
Shortly after Lego Media was formed in the late 90s, a game based on the Technic theme entered development with an unknown developer. Reportedly, the game was canceled after Lego lost confidence in the developer.

=== 1998 ===
==== Lego Fantasy ====
In 1998, Krisalis Software began work on a title called Lego Fantasy, intended as a tie-in for an animated series being developed by Vision Scape Interactive, titled Adventures in LEGO World. After the show was canceled, the studio decided to rework their early prototype into a sequel to Lego Island. However, they were later replaced by Silicon Dreams Studio, who restarted development and developed Lego Island 2: The Brickster's Revenge in 2001.

==== Lego Creator: Star Wars ====
Shortly before the release of Lego Creator and after acquiring the license for Star Wars-themed sets, Lego Media asked Superscape to produce a demo for a potential Star Wars version of the game. After three days of development, Lucasfilm reportedly was not interested when shown the project and declined to give The Lego Group the Star Wars video game license.

Several years later, in 2005, Lego Star Wars: The Video Game was released, the first of several Lego-themed Star Wars games.

==== The Lego Island Learning Project ====
In 2022, storyboards for a canceled project titled The Lego Island Learning Project were discovered. The project was said to have been an attempt to branch out Lego Media to develop educational projects, seemingly based on Lego Island. Reportedly, the idea was abandoned shortly after it was first conceived.

=== 1999 ===
==== Lego Soccer 2000 ====
In the late 1990s, Lego Media began exploring ideas for a soccer-themed game, with Data Design Interactive starting development on Lego Soccer 2000 (also known as Lego Football 2000) in 1998. The game was canceled the following year, and Silicon Dreams Studio later developed Football Mania in 2002 instead.

In 2020, two prototypes of the game were found and preserved.

==== Lego My Style: Parade ====
A third game in the Lego My Style subseries, alongside Lego My Style: Preschool and Lego My Style: Kindergarten, titled Lego My Style: Parade had started development at Brainchild Studios but was never released for unknown reasons.

=== 2000 ===
==== Lego Circus ====
In 2000, Lego Lab began development on another Duplo-themed game similar to the Lego My Style duology, set in a circus. The game was intended to work with the cancelled KidPad platform and use physical Duplo builds and figures to interact with the game. The game was cancelled early in its alpha stage when the Lego Lab division was shut down.

==== Legoland (PlayStation) ====
A version of Legoland was planned for the PlayStation but was canceled as the system was not powerful enough to support the graphics.

==== Lego Stunt Rally (PlayStation) ====
A version of Lego Stunt Rally was planned for the PlayStation but was never released. Development initially began at Intelligent Games before being transferred to Asylum Entertainment after The Lego Group rejected their work on the project. Lead programmer Manel Sort later suggested that Asylum's version was finished but was also rejected by Lego, leading to its cancellation.

In 2020, an early prototype of Intelligent Games' version was discovered and preserved online.

==== Lego Friends 2 ====
In 1998, the German magazine Markt für Computer- und Videospiele listed a sequel to Lego Friends, titled Lego Friends II, in a list of upcoming Lego games, with an estimated release date of “Quarter 2 2000.” A leaked design document from 1998 was later discovered, providing additional information about the game. The game was ultimately canceled for unknown reasons.

=== 2002 ===
==== Lego Bionicle: The Legend of Mata Nui ====
Sometime in early 2001, The Lego Group hired the video game development company Saffire to create a game centered around the original 2001 storyline of the Bionicle toyline, involving the Toa Mata as they fight off against Makuta's swarms of evil Rahi that threat the island of Mata Nui. The game would have each individual Toa go onto their perspective region and fight off against the enemies relating to the level. After beating the level, the Toa would progress onto the next level and would be given a new Kanohi mask to help them along on their journey. Towards the end of the level, the Toa would then have to face off against their perspective elemental monster based on their element. The game was originally meant to be released in 2001, but was pushed back to another year to 2002, before ultimately being cancelled. In 2001 the PC port was planned for release, as well as the possibility of a GameCube port early the following year before being scrapped altogether. The gameplay has been described as being in a similar style to that of The Legend of Zelda series, specifically the Ocarina of Time and Majora's Mask entries of the series.

The game was also planned to have included the original orange Kanohi Mask of Time, but due to the games' cancellation, was instead released as a promotional polybag in select Walgreens stores.

=== 2003 ===
==== Drome Racers (Xbox) ====
An Xbox version of Drome Racers was planned for release in fall 2003 but was canceled for unknown reasons, even to its developers

In March 2020, a development build dated 11 July 2003, was leaked online.

==== Drome Racers 2 ====
Shortly before the company's liquidation in August 2003, reports suggested that Attention To Detail was working on a sequel to Drome Racers, referred to as both Lego Racers 4 and Drome Racers 2. Intended as an open-world title, the game reportedly suffered from significant publisher interference and was canceled as a result of budget disagreements as well as feature creep.

==== Lego Soccer Adventure ====
In 2003, Blitz Games began developing a game titled Lego Soccer Adventure (also known as Lego Super Soccer Adventure). Unlike Football Mania, it was not meant to be a football simulator but rather an action-adventure game that used soccer mechanics in puzzle-based levels. Players would guide a soccer ball through themed environments, solving challenges and avoiding enemies that tried to steal it.

The game was canceled due to the budget becoming too high to continue development. A prototype build for the PlayStation 2, dated 6 February 2003 was later leaked online.

==== Untitled Galidor game ====
As a promotion for the TV series Galidor: Defenders of the Outer Dimension, The Lego Group partnered with Electronic Arts (EA) in 2001 for a video game based on the show. The game was split into two versions, a handheld version for the Game Boy Advance, developed by Tiertex Design Studios, and a console version for GameCube, PlayStation 2, Xbox, and Windows, developed by Asylum Entertainment. The Game Boy Advance version was released on 29 October 2002, while the other versions were scheduled to release in September 2003.

On 3 September 2003, Asylum Entertainment announced that their version of the game had been canceled for all platforms due to financial issues, and the development team was laid off. The Windows version was later released as a budget title and in some Lego game bundles in North America and Europe by Focus Multimedia and ValuSoft.

==== Lego Knights' Kingdom: The Video Game ====
Before Lego Star Wars: The Video Game, Travelers Tales began work on a game based on the second iteration of the Knights' Kingdom theme in 2003. The game was eventually reworked into a Star Wars title due to concerns that it would not be successful, with one of the developers stating it "may not be the best way to have a breakout hit".

A different game based on the theme was released for the GameBoy Advance in 2004, developed by Razorback Developments.

=== 2004 ===
==== Lego Racers CC ====
In 2004, an advertisement for a game titled LEGO Racers CC appeared in some Lego catalogs. No further information about the game has surfaced since.

=== 2005 ===
==== Lego James Bond (first attempt) ====
TT Games created a test animation featuring a James Bond minifigure in 2005, along with Indiana Jones and Lara Croft. Although they hoped to produce a LEGO video game adaptation of James Bond, the release of Casino Royale dissuaded LEGO from licensing the "dark and gritty" property.

==== Lego Tomb Raider ====
The test animation that was created by TT Games featured a Lara Croft minifigure (along with James Bond and Indiana Jones), since Eidos Interactive had published LEGO Star Wars: The Video Game and had a good relationship with TT Games. However, TT Games did not feel that a standalone LEGO Tomb Raider game would not be justified, so they approached Lucasfilm with the proposal of a crossover game starring Lara Croft and Indiana Jones. Lucasfilm immediately shot down the concept due to perceiving Tomb Raider as having "stolen" ideas from Indiana Jones. LEGO Indiana Jones: The Original Adventures was ultimately released without any representation from Tomb Raider.

=== 2008 ===
==== Lego Racers: The Video Game ====
In late 2008, images of some upcoming sets for 2009 were released online. Some of these boxes included an advertisement for a previously unannounced game titled Lego Racers: The Video Game. No further information about the game surfaced until 2013, when an anonymous developer from Firebrand Games shared some screenshots and 3D models they had created for it. They claimed the game was intended for the Nintendo DS, but the screenshots were higher quality than the system could support, suggesting it may have been planned as a dual release for the DS and Wii.

=== 2012 ===
==== Roblox – Lego Star Wars: The Clone Wars event ====
Following the sponsored Lego Hero Factory: Breakout event, the Roblox Corporation and The Lego Group originally had a deal to release another Lego-tie in event on the platform later that same year, but this time, to promote the Lego Star Wars: The Clone Wars line of sets from 2012, that were directly based on the 2008 CGI-animated series of the same name.

The planned event never came to fruition and was ultimately cancelled, and went largely unnoticed for several years until assets, including character models for Darth Vader and a Clone trooper from the event, were discovered via a portfolio site created by Stephen Jobe, a 3D artist contracted by Roblox at the time.

==== Lego The Lord of the Rings (Wii U) ====
A Wii U version of Lego The Lord of the Rings was originally planned as a launch title for the system; however, the port was canceled as TT Games was busy developing Lego City Undercover.

==== Brickcraft ====
In 2011, Minecraft developer Mojang, in collaboration with The Lego Group, created a prototype for a Lego-themed spin-off of the game codenamed Project Rex Kwon Do. However, in July 2012, Markus "Notch" Persson confirmed the project had been canceled in order to focus on other games internally at Mojang.

In December 2020, the game's true nature was revealed publicly for the first time during an episode of the Bits N’ Bricks podcast, which explained that the cancellation had been caused by creative differences between the two companies. Daniel Mathiasen, a Lego Group employee at the time, suggested that the cancellation had been caused by a series of brand restrictions put in place by The Lego Group to protect its family-friendly image, while Mojang business developer Daniel Kaplan said that Mojang had begun to feel more like consultants on the project rather than its designers and co-developers.

In June 2025, a development build, dated 28 June 2012 was rediscovered and archived online.

=== 2013 ===
==== Lego City Undercover 2 ====
Shortly after the release of Lego City Undercover in 2013, several developers at TT Fusion pitched a sequel but it was rejected for unknown reasons.

=== 2014 ===
==== Lego The Hobbit The Battle of the Five Armies DLC ====
At the London Toy Fair held in January 2014 a DLC covering the events of the final film in The Hobbit series, was reported to be released around the time of the film at the end of that year. Ultimately, no DLC was released. Over a year later, in a correspondence with GameSpot it was revealed that, despite no actual cancellation of the DLC, there were no longer any plans to adapt the film as a DLC, nor to adapt it as another game.

=== 2017 ===
==== Lego Dimensions Year Three ====
Before its discontinuation in October 2017, a third year of content for Lego Dimensions had been planned.

New franchises planned for Year Three included Despicable Me, Captain Underpants, How to Train Your Dragon, Shrek, The Croods, The Smurfs, Avatar, (Note: Its unclear if Avatar was supposed to be Avatar: The Last Airbender or Avatar (2009).) Pirates of the Caribbean, King Kong, Godzilla, Minecraft, Angry Birds, Mega Man, Classic Universal Monsters, Thunderbirds, Looney Tunes, Tom & Jerry, Tintin, Teenage Mutant Ninja Turtles, The Flash and Arrow. Additionally, the game's main villain, Lord Vortech, was planned to be released in a Fun Pack alongside his sidekick, X-PO with the special ability to automatically unlock all the hub worlds from Year One.

Planned content from existing franchises included Level Packs for Scooby-Doo, Doctor Who, Teen Titans Go!, The Powerpuff Girls, and Wonder Woman.

==== Lego James Bond (second attempt) ====
A pitch composed of cutscenes recreating various scenes from the movies was made towards the end of development on Lego Dimensions by the same studio, TT Games. Two different versions of the trailers were leaked onto Discord in late 2024, and its authenticity was confirmed by Paul Hughes, a former tech director on Lego-related projects at TT Fusion.

==== Lego Civilization crossover ====
In April 2025, the contents of a Nintendo Switch development kit from 2017 were leaked online. Among these files, a title screen was discovered for what appeared to be a Lego-themed crossover game with the Civilization series. The game was not playable or bootable beyond this screen, so its gameplay remains unknown.

==== Lego Worlds Survivor DLC ====
At E3 2017, a trailer was released for a DLC expansion to Lego Worlds titled Survivor, with an estimated release window of Fall 2017. The DLC was never released for unknown reasons.

=== 2019 ===
==== Lego Worlds Wildlife Park Pack DLC ====
In 2019, unused assets and promotional art for a canceled Lego Worlds DLC titled the Wildlife Park Pack were discovered in the files of The Lego Movie 2 Videogame. The specifics of the DLC and the reason for its cancellation are unknown.

=== 2021 ===
==== Lego Worlds (mobile) ====
A mobile version of Lego Worlds codenamed Project Lego X had reportedly been in development by Playdemic before the studio was acquired by Electronic Arts (EA). TT Games took over development following the acquisition and the game was quietly canceled sometime after.

=== 2022 ===
==== Project Marley ====
In March 2023, a report from Nintendo Life revealed that a Disney themed Lego game that was not based on Star Wars or Marvel, known internally as Project Marley, had been in development at TT Games before being cancelled in 2022. The game was set to include characters from several Disney and Pixar animated films, as well as franchises such as The Muppets, Pirates of the Caribbean and The Nightmare Before Christmas.

Gameplay was described as being similar to Disney Dreamlight Valley, with players exploring an overworld alongside dungeons, with the player's main objective being to cleanse each world of a mysterious force corrupting the environment. Reportedly, TT Games had been struggling with the direction of the game and canceled it after about four years of development due to the similarities to Disney Dreamlight Valley which launched in early access the same year.

==== Project Cosmic ====
A Marvel themed game, based on the Guardians of the Galaxy, known internally as Project Cosmic, had been in development by TT Games for around a year and a half before being canceled for unknown reasons.

=== 2023 ===
==== LEGO 2K Goooal! ====
In March 2023, following leaks the previous year, it was announced that The LEGO Group and 2K Games had formed a multi-game partnership, with the first title, LEGO 2K Drive, released on 19 May 2023.

In June 2023, a rating was discovered on the South Korean ratings board suggesting that the next game would be a football game titled LEGO 2K Goooal!. Around the same time, several listings for the game were briefly published on the PlayStation Store and Amazon UK before quickly being taken down. No further information on the game has emerged since, and it appears to have been quietly cancelled, amid other cancellations by 2K's parent company, Take-Two Interactive. Additionally, LEGO 2K Drive was delisted from digital storefronts in May 2026, suggesting 2K may have lost the LEGO license.

==== Untitled 2K Games Sports game ====
In 2022, some reports suggested that 2K Games had plans for a third game alongside Lego 2K Drive and the rumored Lego 2K Goooal!. The game was described as being based on a major sports franchise, though the specific sport was not specified. Similar to Lego 2K Goooal!, the game appears to have been quietly canceled due to the underperformance of Lego 2K Drive as well as other cancellations by 2K's parent company, Take-Two Interactive. Additionally, LEGO 2K Drive was delisted from digital storefronts in May 2026, suggesting 2K may have lost the LEGO license.

== Films ==
=== 2004 ===
==== Bionicle 2: Legends of Metru Nui Game Boy Advance Video ====
In 2026, screenshots were discovered for an unreleased version of the film Bionicle 2: Legends of Metru Nui for Game Boy Advance Video.

=== 2010 ===
==== Untitled Bionicle: The Legend Reborn sequel ====
In 2009 Universal Home Entertainment released a CGI-animated direct-to-video film, titled Bionicle: The Legend Reborn.

Not much info has been revealed about the sequel, but a general idea of the film's plot through the first draft was posted on the unofficial Bionicle community site BZPower in a blog post by Greg Farshtey (who went under the name GregF on fan-sites), the story writer for the series.

=== 2012 ===
==== Untitled live-action Hero Factory film ====
In 2012 The Hollywood Reporter reported that Universal were trying to sign a deal with The Lego Group to acquire the film rights for a live-action film based on the Hero Factory toyline. Michael Finch and Alex Litvak were said to have wrote the film, while Mark Gordon and Bryan Zuriff of The Mark Gordon Company were set to produce alongside Ben Forkner and Dean Schnider of Film 360.

=== 2015 ===
==== The Billion Brick Race ====
In March 2015, Warner Bros. announced that a third Lego Movie spin-off, titled The Billion Brick Race was in development. Jason Segel and Drew Pearce were signed on to co-direct and write the film. By August 2017, Jorge R. Gutierrez signed on as director, with Pearce stepping down. At that time, the film was scheduled to be released on 24 May 2019, but in 2018 Gutierrez left the project. Following the box office underperformance of The Lego Movie 2: The Second Part, the franchise moved to Universal Pictures in December 2019.

=== 2016 ===
==== Contagious and Emmet Amuck ====
Two additional shorts based on The Lego Movie (franchise) for theatrical distribution were in production alongside The Master in 2016: Contagious directed by Patrick Osbourne, and Emmet Amuck directed by Jon Saunders and Ross Evans. Both ultimately went unreleased.

=== 2022 ===
==== Lego Superfriends ====
In December 2018 Chris McKay confirmed that a sequel to The Lego Batman Movie was in development and that he would return to direct the film.

Plans were to have the film be released in December 2022, but this release date was dropped, alongside the entirety of the production on the sequel due to Universal Pictures acquiring the film rights to produce full length Lego films.

In 2021 McKay revealed that the script was being written by Michael Waldron and Dan Harmon. It would have focused on Batman's relationship with the Justice League, particularly Superman, and the main villains would have been Lex Luthor and OMAC.

== Shows ==
=== 1997 ===
==== Lego Pirates ====
Around 1997, Mindscape, the developer of Lego Island, pitched a television series titled Lego Pirates to The Lego Group, but it was rejected. The project was later picked up by the BBC, but was never released due to regulations concerning advertising to children. The pilot was later found and uploaded to YouTube in 2018.

=== 1998 ===
==== Adventures in Lego World ====
Around 1998, Vision Scape Interactive began work on an animated series called Adventures in LEGO World. The show would have followed three children and their dog, Blocko, who use magical watches to travel to LEGO World. Little is known about the series beyond a demo that was once available on Vision Scape's website.
