= Lego Creator (disambiguation) =

Lego Creator is a theme of the Lego construction toys.

Lego Creator may also refer to:

- Lego Creator (video game), a PC game
  - Lego Creator: Knights' Kingdom
  - Lego Creator: Harry Potter
