= Lego Creator =

Lego theme

- Sub‑themes: 3 in 1, Botanical Collection, Designer Set, Inventor Set, Magazine Gifts, Miscellaneous, Model Making, Modular, Mosaic, Postcard, Promotional, Seasonal, Traffic, Value Packs and X-Pod
- Availability: 2001–present
- Total sets: 610
- Official website

Lego Creator is a Lego theme for generic models. Creator sets have few specialized bricks to create buildings, creatures, vehicles, and robots. Some sets featured instructions for three different possible builds from the bricks included and most sets in recent years have used the 3-in-1 label. Creator is also a parent theme to Lego Icons, a Lego subtheme for adolescents and adults featuring advanced building techniques and large piece counts, mostly known for Modular Buildings and detailed vehicles. Creator also has had several other subthemes such as X-Pods and mosaics.

== Overview ==
The original theme called Creator was launched in 2001 and had over-sized minifigures, such as mascots Tina and Max, targeting a younger demographic but was discontinued after one year. In 2002, the Creator name was used for sets composed of buckets or tubs of generic Lego bricks, which later became "Make and Create" and then "Bricks and More". In 2003, a theme called "Designer" began have subject specific sets with bricks and instructions included to build multiple models based around a concept, such as vehicles or animals. In 2006, Lego then began branding its Designer sets under the "Creator" theme. In 2004, a subtheme called X-Pods had similar smaller builds included in travel-sized containers and was also then branded under the Creator theme in 2006. The 2006 X-Pods were also the first Creator theme to use the "3-in-1" labeling on the packaging, which later became a primary feature of Creator sets. In 2007, the Creator line introduced two sets based around creating mosaics under a separate sub-theme. The theme began including Lego minifigures in sets based around buildings in 2011.

In September 2021, Matthew Ashton, The Lego Group's Vice President of Design announced the Creator alongside City, Friends, Lego Classic, Technic, Speed Champions, Monkie Kid, Ninjago, Collectible Minifigures and DOTS themes were continue until at least 2023.

== Sub-themes ==
According to BrickLink, The Lego Group released 610 playsets as part of the Lego Creator theme.

=== 3-in-1 ===
3-in-1 is a subtheme that provides instructions split into three parts that allow young builders to choose three different ways to build models such as creatures, structures and vehicles, including Mythical Creatures and Pirate Roller Coaster.

=== X-Pods ===
X-Pods were formerly a subtheme of Designer sets from 2004 to 2005 and transitioned to the Creator brand in 2006. X-Pods were small, portable containers that contained small sets of Lego bricks. They came with a strap to join them together for easy mobility and transportation. The X-Pod theme also had smaller polybag versions of select sets without the mobile pod itself and had the first branded Creator 3-in-1 sets in 2006.

=== Creator Expert / Icons ===
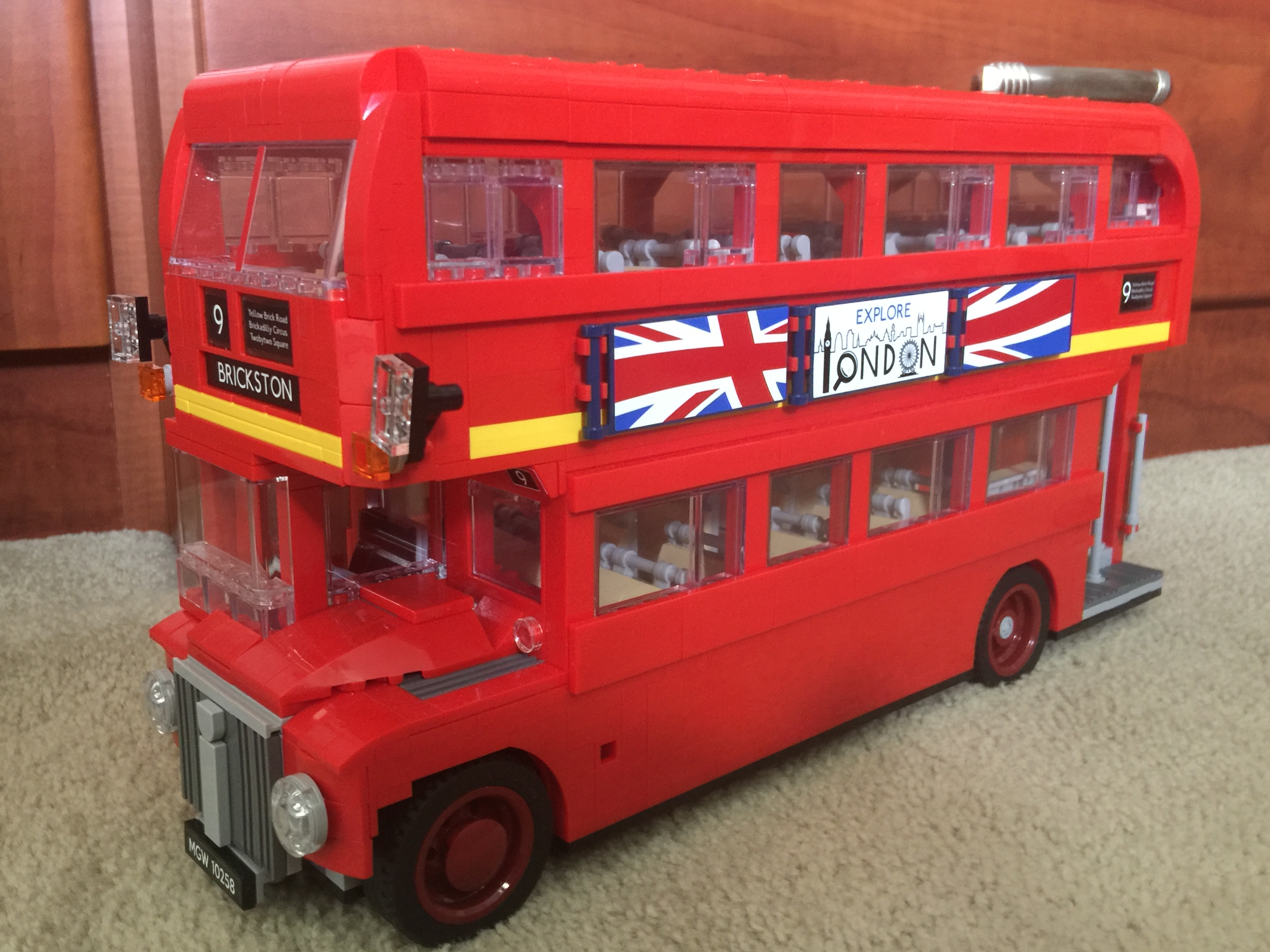
A Lego model depicting a real-life London Bus

Starting in January 2013, Lego merged its advanced technique models into the Creator line under a new sub-theme called Creator Expert, with the first release being 10233 Horizon Express. Previously, the advanced sets had been themed under Lego Model Team until the labeling was discontinued in 1999. After Model Team, the advanced sets had no labeled theme and were typically only sold as exclusives. The exclusive sets were later re-released under the Creator Expert brand, with some received new updated packaging such as the 10220 Volkswagen T1 Camper Van that had originally been released in 2011.

Creator Expert is focused specifically for adolescents and adults. In 2020, the boxes ceased using the branding as "Creator Expert" and simply used an 18+ age rating and simple black box to further advertise for an older demographic, although the sets continued to be sold under the Creator brand at the Lego website. Creator Expert typically has annual releases that follow themes such as a Winter Village; a product line first released in 2009 focusing on winter-holiday aspects, Modular Buildings; a series of town, apartment, and retail structures first launched in 2007, and models based on real world vehicles.

In 2021, Lego launched the Botanical Collection sub-theme featuring sets inspired by plants, flowers and other flora. The Flower Bouquet and the Bonsai Tree sets were the first to be released, with sets inspired by bird of paradise flowers, orchids and succulents following. Due to immense popularity, the collection became its own theme in 2025 and was renamed to simply Botanicals.

In 2022, the Lego Group announced the Lego Creator Expert theme would be rebranded as Lego Icons come January 2023.

== Video games ==
=== Lego Creator (video game) ===
Lego Creator is a sandbox game for Microsoft Windows, which involves building with virtual Lego elements. The game has no missions, objectives, challenges, or money constraints. The game was released on 11 November 1998.

=== Lego Creator: Knights' Kingdom ===
Lego Creator: Knights' Kingdom is a construction simulation video game for Microsoft Windows. It allows players to use virtual Lego pieces, first to build a medieval kingdom, and then to use the kingdom in a battle against the character Cedric the Bull. It is a stand-alone sequel to the 1998 game Lego Creator, and is based on the first incarnation of Lego's Knights' Kingdom theme.

=== Lego Creator: Harry Potter ===
Two sandbox games were released as part of the Lego Creator series: Lego Creator: Harry Potter (2001) and Creator: Harry Potter and the Chamber of Secrets (2002). Both games allow the player to build their own sets in a virtual world based on the Lego Harry Potter theme, and interact with their constructions by taking control over minifigures or creatures that have been added to the world by the player.

== Reception ==
In 2015, The Lego Group reported that the Lego City, Lego Creator, Lego Technic and Lego Star Wars themes had contributed to its first half results jump 18 per cent for 2015.

In January 2023, Fantasy Forest Creatures (set number: 31125), Downtown Noodle Shop (set number: 31131), Majestic Tiger (set number: 31129) and Medieval Castle (set number: 31120) were listed as one of "The Best Lego Sets for Kids in 2023" by IGN.

== Awards and nominations ==
In 2019, Roller Coaster set was awarded "Toy of the Year" and also "Playset of the Year" by the Toy Association.

In 2022, Flower Bouquet (set number: 10280) was awarded "Toy of the Year" and also "Grown-Up Toy of the Year" by the Toy Association. Everyone is Awesome (set number: 40516) was awarded "Toy of the Year" and also "Specialty Toy of the Year" by the Toy Association. Everyone is Awesome (set number: 40516) also won British LGBT Awards for 2022.

In 2022, adidas Originals Superstar (set number: 10282) was awarded "Best Licensed Product“ in the category "Toys, Games, Novelties (ages 8 and up)" by Licensing International in Las Vegas.

In 2022, Ferris Wheel (set number: 31119) was awarded "STEAM Toy of the Year" by the Toy Association.

== See also ==
- Lego Icons
- Lego Modular Buildings
