= Lego Ideas =

Online program by Danish toy manufacturer LEGO

- Other names: Lego Cuusoo (2008–2014)
- Subject: Community Supported Builds
- Availability: 2008–present
- Total sets: 82
- Official website

Lego Ideas (formerly known as Lego Cuusoo and stylized in start case) is a website run by The Lego Group, which allows users to submit ideas for Lego products to be turned into potential sets available commercially, with the original designer receiving 1% of the royalties. It began in 2008 as an offshoot of the Japanese company CUUSOO, named after the Japanese word 空想 kūsō, meaning "daydream" or "fantasy".

== Background ==
Under the name LEGO CUUSOO, the original website was labeled a beta test until rebranding as LEGO Ideas.

== Process ==
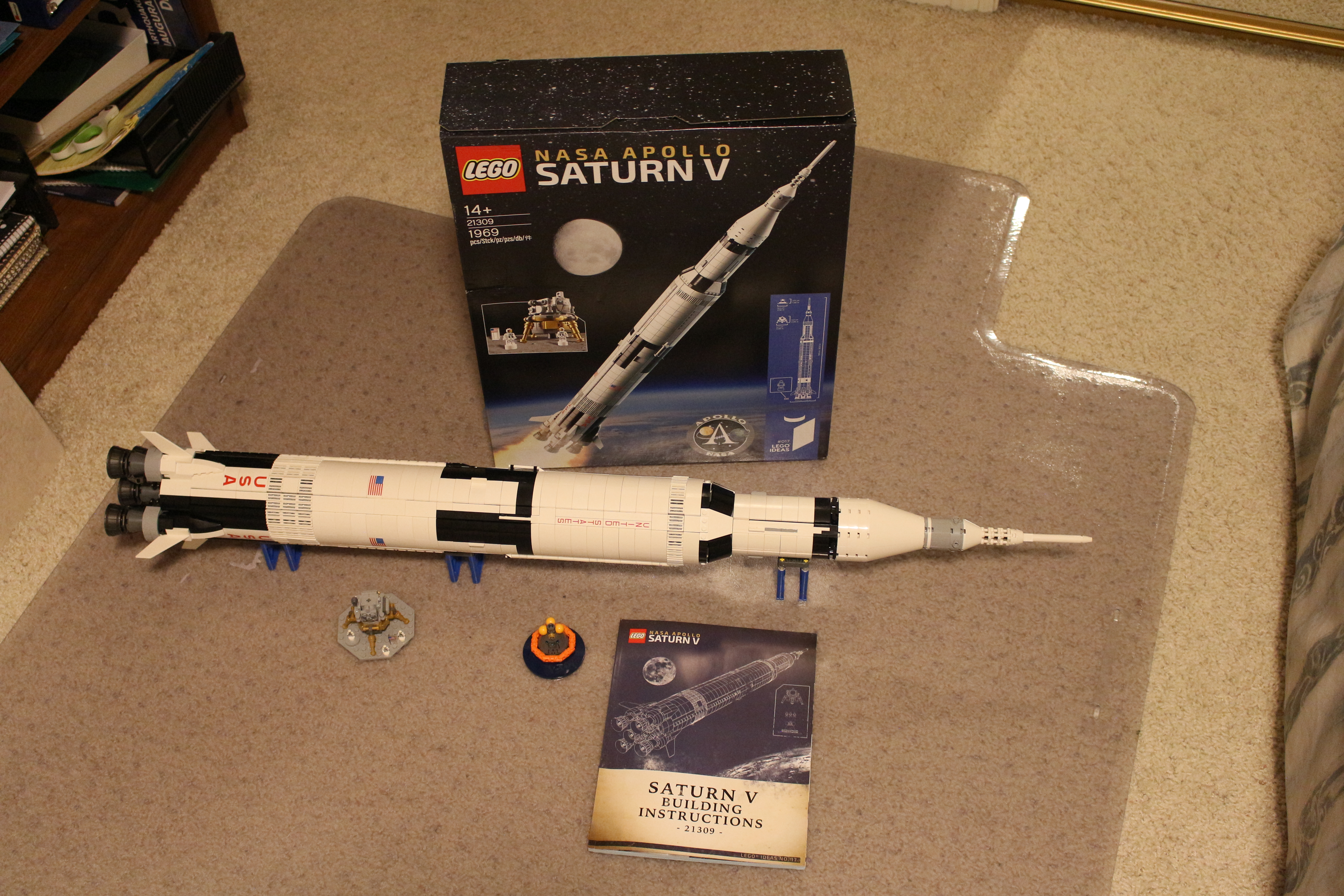
#17 is the Apollo 11 Saturn V rocket, and contains 1969 pieces, a number chosen to match the year of the first Moon landing.

=== User submission phase ===
Users express their idea by combining a written description of the idea and a sample Lego model that demonstrates the concept into a project page. Once the page is published it is viewable to other users. The goal of every project is to be supported by 10,000 different users, which would then make the project eligible for review. At first, projects would be kept on the Cuusoo/Ideas website for up to two years and then taken down if the project did not reach the 10,000 required votes of support. Lego Ideas later changed the threshold to include a minimum number of 100 votes in the first 60 days after submission or the project would expire, followed by a year to reach 1,000 votes, another six months to reach 5,000 votes and finally six months to reach the 10,000 supported votes.

Originally, project submissions were allowed to be about anything and had no limits on the size and style of project. After sets began to be rejected with stated reasons, Lego Ideas announced restrictions on content including the use of no new part molds, banning intellectual properties owned by competing toy companies, and adult content. Lego Ideas further restricted project submissions in June 2016 by limiting the size of the project to a maximum of 3,000 pieces (an update on September 30, 2024, raised the element count from 3,000 to 5,000. A minimum element count was also set at 200 elements. This same update also introduced a minifigure-to-element ratio), any project replicating a life-size weapon, and any project based on an intellectual property already produced as a set by Lego Ideas/Cuusoo. Ideas further restricted submissions in 2017 by disallowing any projects based on third-party licenses already being produced by Lego, such as Star Wars and Harry Potter.

All eligible projects are collectively reviewed in the order of whichever projects hit 10,000 supporters within any of the three tri-annual deadlines of May, September, or January.

=== Review phase ===
Due to the increasing number of project submissions based on ideas that The Lego Group would reject, Lego Ideas has refined its submission standards over the years.

Since its inception, a number of sets that have reached the 10,000 vote threshold have been rejected during the review for various reasons. Some rejected sets have been based on specific intellectual properties were rejected due to the content matter presented. Any theme that relates to alcohol, sex, drugs, religious references, post-World War II warfare or based on a first-person shooter is deemed inappropriate for younger Lego fans. IPs that have been rejected for this reason have been based on Firefly and Shaun of the Dead.

Other projects which have been rejected include ones based on My Little Pony: Friendship Is Magic due to the property being owned by rival toy manufacturer Hasbro, certain sets based on The Legend of Zelda due to the need to create too many original molds, although Lego did not completely rule out other projects based on the franchise, and a Sandcrawler set for the Ultimate Collector Series due to The Lego Group's ongoing collaboration with Lucasfilm on Lego Star Wars. My Little Pony and other Hasbro based properties not already under Lego's current lines were eventually allowed under the line once the partnership started between Lego and Hasbro for Transformers in the Lego Icons line. The first Hasbro IP to come out of the Ideas line would be based on Dungeons & Dragons in 2024.

In the first 2015 review, announced in October 2015, no projects were selected for the first time as the many projects were rejected for various reasons. Many of these projects would not have met the revised submission standards issued in June 2016.

A record 26 projects qualified for the first 2020 review followed by another record 35 qualified projects in the second 2020 review. Lego cited the sudden increase in projects surpassing the 10,000 vote threshold was likely due to the global lockdown amidst the COVID-19 pandemic. The first 2021 review phase saw yet another record number with 57 qualified projects after one project was disqualified due to an intellectual property conflict.

=== Production phase ===
If the product is cleared for production, it is further developed by Lego set designers and the final model gets released as an official set under the "Lego Ideas" banner. Users that have their projects produced receive ten copies of the final set, as well as a 1% royalty of the product's net sales and credit and bio in set materials as the Lego Ideas set creator.

== Awards and nominations ==
Caption text
Set	Award	Year	Notes
The Office (set number: 21336)	Toy Association	2022	won Toy of the Year
The Office (set number: 21336)	Toy Association	2022	Grown-Up Toy of the Year"

== See also ==
- BrickLink AFOL Designer Program
- Lego Design byME
