= Lego Chess =

1998 video game

- Developer: Krisalis Software
- Publisher: Lego Media
- Director: Andrew Ware
- Producer: Dave Upchurch
- Designer: Jeff Rollason
- Programmer: Graeme Richardson
- Artists: Rob Richardson; Phillip Hackney; Paul Dobson
- Composers: David R. Punshon; Richard Wells
- Platform: Microsoft Windows
- Release: 11 November 1998
- Genres: Strategy, chess
- Modes: Single-player, multiplayer

Lego Chess is a Lego-themed, chess-based strategy video game developed by Krisalis Software, published by Lego Media, and released for Microsoft Windows in 1998.

== Development ==
Following the success of Lego Island, The Lego Group was still cautious about entering the gaming market, believing it could hurt or even overtake their toy sales. Around this time, the company formed their own publishing division, Lego Media International, whose goal was to work with outside developers and further explore ideas for Lego games. The first three titles developed under this initiative were Lego Creator by Superscape, Lego Chess by Krisalis Software, and Lego Loco by Intelligent Games, all released on 11 November 1998.

The Castle theme was planned to be included in the game but was cut due to time constraints. Some concept art suggests that the Adventurers theme was also planned.

== Gameplay ==
The rules of the game can be changed to cater to many popular variations, though the most common rules of chess are the default rules. During a game, clicking on a piece will show the available places to move to. If a piece is captured, a short video plays showing the captured character being caught, with each different capture having its own video clip. These clips are rarely related to chess. Because each individual piece has a set of separate video clips for catching an opposing piece, there are 60 clips in total.

=== Story mode ===
In story mode, the player can pick either a western or pirates theme. After selecting the theme, a three-round chess tournament against the AI opponent begins, with each round featuring a more difficult AI opponent, up to 75% at the third round. When starting a round, a story cutscene plays. In the western theme, a sheriff sets out to capture three bank robbers, and in the pirate theme, a colonial navy officer races against a pirate captain to find buried treasure. At the end of a round, another cutscene plays, depending on whether the player won or lost. Once a full story is completed, a printable certificate is rewarded. The story mode takes around an hour to complete.

=== Tutorial mode ===
The tutorial mode teaches how to play chess, from the basics of movement for the different pieces, to advanced playing techniques. The player is taught by the "Chess King", a king minifigure with an Elvis Presley-esque voice who commands an army represented on the board by the white pieces. The Chess King slightly modernizes the explanations of the pieces. For example, it is said that the reason knights can jump over other pieces is that they ride BMX Motor Bikes. The King on his throne was also a Lego set, packaged with the first release of the game.

=== Versus mode ===
In this mode, the player can choose the difficulty of the game when playing against the AI opponent. Multi-player mode can also be selected here. Alternatively, the player can watch a simulated game between AI players. In addition, a third, traditional chess set (though still constructed from Lego bricks) can be chosen, and all three sets can be mixed (pirates playing against western, for example), but animations for capturing pieces are disabled when playing with mixed sets. Players can also remove or add pieces from gameplay before or during the game.
