= Ducati Extreme =

2004 video game

- Developer: Vir2L Studios
- Publisher: Mforma
- Platform: J2ME
- Release: November 5, 2004

Ducati Extreme is a 2004 racing video game developed from Vir2L Studios. The game was released on November 5, 2004.

== Gameplay ==
Ducati 3D Extreme is a motorbike racing game involving Ducati motorcycles. The game begins with players racing on a souped-up Ducati street bike and progresses to race-spec superbikes. The racing career spans four picturesque regions of Italy: Sicily, the Italian Alps, Tuscan hillsides, and the Amalfi coast. Each location offers three to four different challenges, including racing against other speed enthusiasts and sticking to the racing line. The game features 3D visuals, detailed bike models, and varied tracks. Controls require players to change gears to adjust speed rather than using traditional accelerator or brake buttons. Players can customize controls for a more comfortable experience.

== Development ==
In November 2005, Ducati 3D Extreme was released on the Superscape Cingular network.

== Reception ==
Reception

Review scores
Publication	Score
All Game Guide	3/5 (3D Version)
Pocket Gamer	4/5 (3D Version)
Wireless Gaming Review	8.3/10

Wireless Gaming Review called the game interesting and appealing for many hours. Pocket Gamer gave the 3D version a score of 4 out of 5, saying 'Ducati 3D Extreme will reward you with high-powered pocket racing, which you'll keep coming back to like a favourite stretch of A-road"
