= Brain Voyage =

2008 video game

- Box art
- Developer: Razorback Developments
- Publisher: Eidos Interactive
- Platform: Nintendo DS
- Release: EU: April 11, 2008; AU: April 24, 2008; NA: May 5, 2008
- Genres: Educational; Puzzle
- Mode: Single-player

Brain Voyage is an educational video game released for the Nintendo DS in the PAL region and in North America on April 11, 2008, and May 5, 2008, respectively. The game was first released in the PAL region under the name Dr. Reiner Knizia's Brainbenders. The player solves puzzles while traveling around the world to iconic global cities and locales that each have five of those puzzles. Such locations include Cape Town, South Africa; Beijing, China; Rio de Janeiro, Brazil; New Mexico, United States; and the Aztec Ruins National Monument. All of the puzzles were designed by the award-winning board game designer Reiner Knizia.

== Reception ==
Reception

Aggregate score
Aggregator	Score
Metacritic	52/100

Review scores
Publication	Score
GameSpot	5/10
GameSpy	2.5/5
GameZone	5.4/10
IGN	5/10
Pocket Gamer	7/10

Brain Voyage received mixed reviews from critics upon release. On Metacritic, the game holds a score of 52/100 based on 12 reviews, indicating "mixed or average reviews".
