= Lego Design byME =

Service offered by the Lego toy corporation

- Other names: Lego Factory
- Availability: 2005; 21 years ago (as Lego Factory)–2012
- Total sets: 8
- Official website

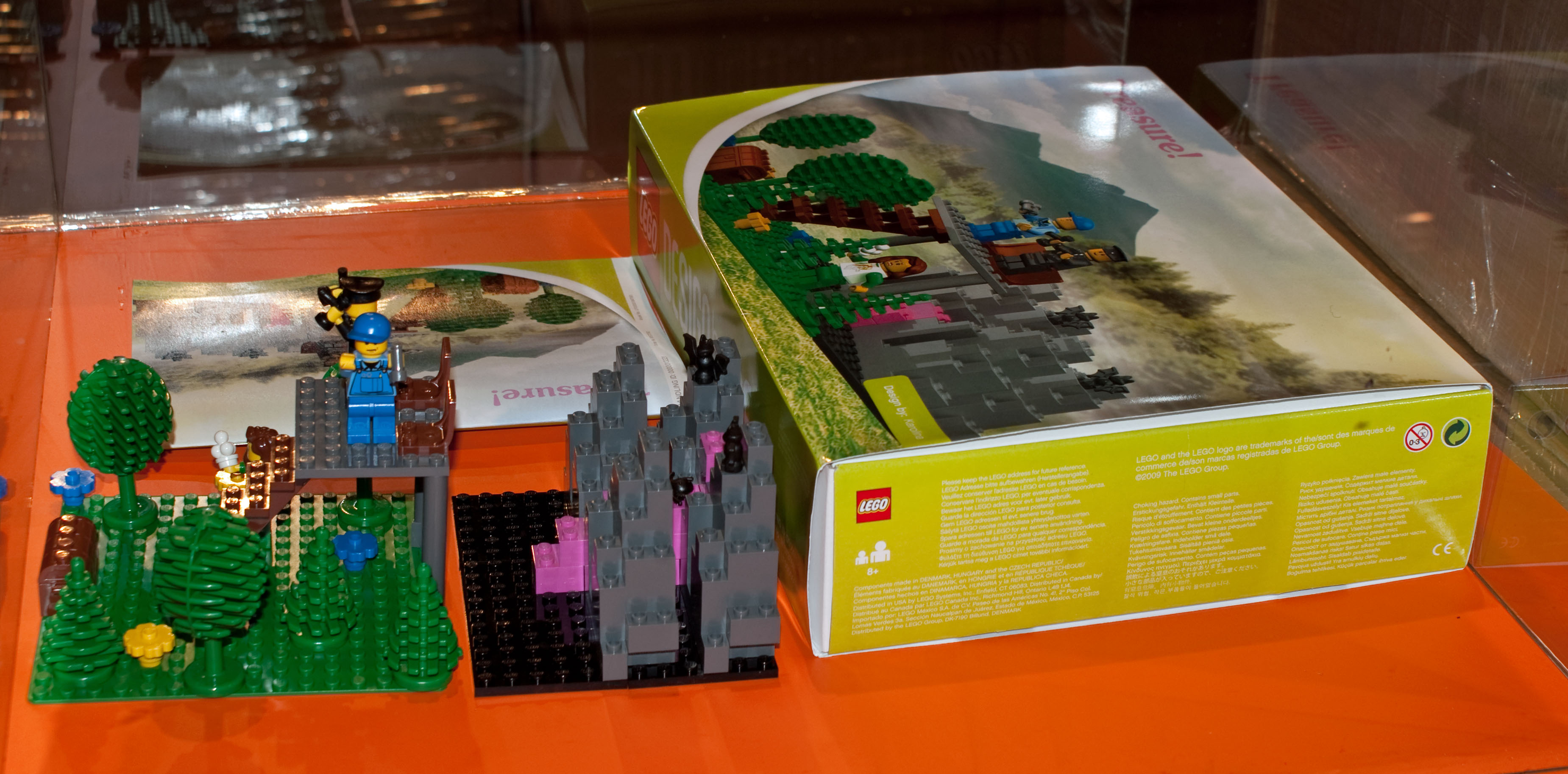
Lego Design byME set designed with Lego Digital Designer

Lego Design byME (previously known as Lego Factory since the 2005 launch) was a service connected with the construction toy Lego. Using this service, people could design their own Lego models using Lego Digital Designer, then upload them to the Lego website, design their own box design, and order them for actual delivery. The brand also covered a small selection of products that have been designed by Lego fans, and which were available to purchase as a set.

== System ==
Lego Design byME was created for people to build and experiment with virtual Lego bricks. This was done on a program called Lego Digital Designer. Models were uploaded to Design byME on the Lego website, and creations could either be shared with the world in the gallery or purchased as a custom Lego set.

=== Pricing ===
When purchasing models from Lego Design byME, the price was significantly high compared to store-bought Lego sets, leading consumers to believe that the prices were unreasonable. However, the price was divided into a few different parts. These are listed below:

- A service fee, which includes the handpicking of bricks and producing a custom made box.
- The cost of the bricks, which is based on the amount as well as the types of bricks in the model.
- Standard shipping fees.
- The optional building guide does not produce any additional fee.

Design byME did not accept returns due to its classification as a custom service.

== Discontinuation of service ==
In late 2011, Lego announced that it would discontinue its Design byME service in its current form forcing patrons to buy sets created by developers. As of 16 January 2012, models created in Lego Digital Designer can no longer be purchased directly as Lego Design byME sets. This does not affect the HERO Recon Team Hero Creator range of products. At the time, Lego confirmed that it would continue Lego Digital Designer as a free design software, and also keep its Pick-a-Brick service operational. Lego claims that Design byME has proven to be "too complex for children", and that despite its success, "the overall Design byME experience has struggled to live up to the quality standards for a LEGO service". Subsequently, in 2016 Lego also discontinued support for Lego Digital Designer.

== List of sets ==
- 5524 Airport – Location: Super Airport, Hotel
- 5525 Amusement Park – Location: Pirate Ship, Car Race, Ski Slope, Robo Destroyer
- 5526 Skyline – Location: Hot Pursuit, Sears Tower, Liberty, LEGO Corp
- 10183 Hobby Trains
- 10190 Market Street – Minifigures: Townspeople (3x)
- 10191 Star Justice – Minifigures: Astronauts (4x), Space Robots (x3)
- 10192 Space Skulls – Minifigures: Space Skulls (4x)
- 10200 Custom Car Garage – Minifigures: Repairman (1x), Flagman (1x), Drivers (2x)

== See also ==
- Lego Ideas
- BrickLink AFOL Designer Program
