= Lego Modular Buildings =

Series of Lego sets that resemble real life buildings

- Subject: Advanced collection
- Licensed from: The Lego Group
- Availability: 2007–present
- Total sets: 21

Lego Modular Buildings is a series of Lego building toy sets introduced in 2007, with new sets usually being released annually. Created in response to feedback and suggestions from the Adult Fans of Lego bricks (AFOL) and Teen Fans of Lego (TFOL) communities, the sets in this series are generally intended for more advanced builders.

Although the sets are still scaled around the minifigure and depict town and city life, they are much more complex than traditional Legoland Town/City sets; they contain more than 2,000 total pieces and make use of unorthodox building techniques not usually used in previous official Lego sets. In contrast to most Lego sets aimed at children and adolescents, the suggested age of most sets in the Lego Modular Buildings series is 16 years or older. The Lego Modular Buildings sets have been received with positive reviews and are considered by Lego designers and fans as an "adult collection".

== History ==
In 2006, a poll was taken, aimed at the community. Adults were asked to share an opinion about what concept they would like to see for a future model from the Lego Group. Some of the common ideas submitted were more town and everyday buildings, structures with more architectural detail, realistic buildings, minifigure scale buildings, and solid and enclosed buildings. These ideas were taken into consideration, and a year later, the first set in the Modular Buildings series, Café Corner, was released. Some LEGO fans were invited to provide feedback and suggestions during the design of the set.

All sets in the series can also be joined to form a larger neighborhood layout of several buildings standing adjacent to each other. Connectors at the base of the models are aligned for easy connection with other models in the series.

== Construction sets ==
=== Café Corner (2007) ===
Café Corner (set number: 10182) was the first of the Modular Buildings series sold exclusively through LEGO stores. It was originally released in April 2007 and was loosely based on a corner building in Denmark, as well as other countries around the world. The set contains 2056 pieces and is recommended for builders 16 years of age or older. Some of the set features include a three floor building set on a street corner, a vertical 'Hotel' sign, opening doors and windows, café tables and umbrellas, a striped awning and three minifigures. Many unusual building techniques were incorporated, such as annexes, fanned minifigure-sized skis as decoration, angled corner, and a 3D façade.

Fanned minifigure skis on the facade of the Café Corner

During the development of this first set in the series, the designer team, led by Jamie Berard, considered the cost of several options. One more expensive version had additional café features, dark green interior walls, a bike, and an additional minifigure. In contrast, a lower-cost version of the set was considered, which lacked rear exterior walls, interior stairs, and extra interior walls on the second floor, and had only two minifigures but no bike.

=== Market Street ===
Market Street (set number: 10190) was the second of the Modular Buildings series and designed by Dutch Lego fan Eric Brok under the Lego Factory theme, a theme composed of sets primarily designed by fans of Lego and not by the Lego design team. It was originally released as a follow-up to Café Corner in late 2007. The set contains 1236 pieces and is recommended for builders 10 years of age or older. It was one of the first leading buildings. The set features include opening doors and windows, a gate, a striped awning, and three minifigures. Advanced construction techniques used in Market Street include: curved staircases, "stripped paint" sections on the walls, interchangeable floors, Dutch/Belgian stepped roof, a basement, offset windows, and wrought iron-look decoration and gate.

Market Street is a unique set in the Modular Buildings series in that it has fewer than 2000 pieces and is recommended for builders 10 years and up, rather than the usual 16 or 18. One of the reasons this set was smaller than the others was to provide a lower-cost entry point into the Modular Buildings series. Prior to 2018, this was the only Modular Building set to have minifigures that did not all have the LEGO Classic smile face.

As a Lego Factory set, Market Street was to showcase a fan design, thus promoting the design-it-yourself vision of Lego Factory. The modularity of the resulting model may also inspire people to design their own floor modules (or furniture sets) in Factory, without having to build an entire house.

— Eric Brok, Adult Fan of Lego, Designer of Market Street

Market Street is the only set in the series to be released with Lego Factory branding on the box – and as such is sometimes questioned how official it was intended to be as a modular building entry as it was designed by a fan rather than a Lego designer. Eric Brok, a fan from the Netherlands, designed the set working closely with LEGO designers.

=== Green Grocer (2008) ===
Green Grocer (set number: 10185) was the third of the Modular Buildings series. It was originally released in March 2008. The set contains 2352 pieces and is recommended for builders 16 years of age or older. Some of the set features include a blue and white awning, opening doors and windows, detailed interiors to each room, a roof terrace, a fire escape, access to a courtyard behind the building, and four minifigures. Advanced building techniques used in Green Grocer include using black skeleton legs and hammers to make railings, black spear guns as railings for the fire escape, a paddle for a pendulum in a grandfather clock, and hinges to make a bay window.

Green Grocer differs from the previous two sets in the series because it has a greater level of detail inside. Whereas Café Corner and Market Street had bare interiors, each floor in Green Grocer contains a prop such as a radiator or some furniture. The first floor is fully furnished as a grocery store with refrigerated shelves with opening doors, and cartons of food. The assortment of Lego food pieces in the grocery includes carrots, apples, and bananas. There is also a stairway to the apartment above and a mailbox set with letters.

=== Fire Brigade (2009) ===
Fire Brigade (set number: 10197) was the fourth set in the Modular Buildings series, released in September 2009. The set contains 2231 pieces and is recommended for builders 16 years of age or older. Modelled to look like a realistic 1930s fire station, the set includes a bell tower, an opening garage door, a 1930s-style fire truck, and four minifigures with a fire-dog. Unlike the previous modulars, all floors in the Fire Brigade set are fully furnished. The Fire Brigade is the first Modular to come with a vehicle, the 1930s-style fire truck. The set also includes some new, unique pieces, such as gold fire helmets and a red sliding garage door.

New building techniques introduced with this set include a method of creating numbers built into the structure using standard Lego bricks. On the front of the building, the year 1932 appears, which is a reference to when Lego was founded. The number 3 also appears on the pavement of the set, representing that this is the third set in the series from Lego set designer Jamie Berard, who had previously designed Café Corner and Green Grocer.

=== Grand Emporium (2010) ===
Grand Emporium (set number: 10211) is the fifth set in the Modular Buildings series and the second corner building released in March 2010. The set contains 2182 pieces and is recommended for builders 16 years of age or older. Modeled to look like a realistic early 20th-century department store, the set includes an exterior with an ice cream stand, store window displays, a window washer platform, and a rooftop billboard. Interior details for the three-floor building include an escalator, a dressing room, and a wide assortment of merchandise. It is built as a block corner building, similarly to Café Corner, Palace Cinema, Brick Bank, Corner Garage, and Boutique Hotel. There are seven minifigures, including two that are decorated with blank faces to look like mannequins.

=== Pet Shop (2011) ===
Pet Shop (set number: 10218) is the sixth set in the Modular Buildings series, released in May 2011. The set contains 2032 pieces and is recommended for builders 16 years of age or older. It is the first set in the series that is actually two buildings that are separated using the same Technic pins that link the rest of the modular buildings together. They can be reversed or separated and wrapped around another building. The brown building is a brownstone-style townhouse with elevated ground floor atop a crawl space, and the sand blue building is the Pet Shop. The brown building was the second building after Market Street that had a basement. There is a feature on the Pet Shop on the ground floor where the staircase can be folded away for more access room for playing, as this was an issue with Market Street. There are four minifigures, two parrots, one dog, one cat, and a fish tank with goldfish. The set also includes three dog bones, a ball, a frog toy, a birdhouse, a bucket, and a brush. Until the Brick Bank, this was also the shortest set by height and stands at just over 25 cm. The next tallest modular is Market Street at 33 cm. The set includes a full interior, including a toilet, bed, kitchen, and fireplace.

=== Town Hall (2012) ===
Town Hall (set number: 10224) was released in March 2012 and is the seventh set in the Modular Building line. The set contains 2766 pieces and is recommended for builders 14 and over. It is the tallest Modular set, taking the title from the Green Grocer, having three floors with generally higher ceilings than the norm, plus a clock and bell tower on the roof. It contains many interior details, such as a working elevator, along with board tables and balconies to look out to the floor below. Along with the many interior decor details, the building features the pilastered portico and brick façade treatments of United States Colonial Revival architecture. The 1891 date on the building represents the birth year of the founder of Lego, and when reversed, it is the birth year of the designer, Astrid Graabæk (1981). The set was released by LEGO on 16 February 2012. There are eight minifigures in the set, including a wedding couple. The set had a global discontinuation date of 31 December 2014 and had a much shorter lifespan than its predecessors.

=== Palace Cinema (2013) ===
Palace Cinema (set number: 10232) was released in March 2013. It is the eighth set in the Modular Building line and the third corner building. The set contains 2194 pieces and features architectural homage to the Egyptian Revival architecture of the early 20th century, albeit with Chinese-like cultural appropriations similar to Hollywood's Grauman's Chinese Theatre. As such, it also features Hollywood Walk of Fame type printed star tiles for the outer sidewalk, LEGO elements that returned to decorate the walls in 2018's Downtown Diner. Palace Cinema is the first Modular Building set to be released with the Lego Creator Expert branding on its box and was the first to include stickers. Some of these are movie posters containing Lego in-jokes such as the ubiquitous brick separator tool used to disassemble (Godzilla-like "The Brick Separator"), the time-consuming sorting of Lego elements ("Forever Sorting"), and Lego's iconic 1990 red Airport Shuttle 6399 set ("Mystery On The Monorail"). Also, Palace Cinema was the second of the Modular Building sets to have only two floors (albeit with higher ceilings than the norm) instead of the usual three, and the second to include a vehicle: a black car styled loosely on a convertible Buick.

The ground floor is the ticket and concessions area, leading up to the theater floor housing a reel-to-reel projector showing a black and white motion picture to a maximum seating of six. This floor also has stairs accessing the roof, atop which the two brick-built promotional searchlights can be placed. The set includes six minifigures.

=== Parisian Restaurant (2014) ===
Parisian Restaurant (set number: 10243) is the ninth set in the Modular Building line and was released in January 2014. This set contains 2469 pieces and has a fully stocked, blue and white tiled kitchen with tableware serving two interior tables, two street-side tables (on a patio tiled in a subtle design with the word "CHEZ"), and two upper terrace tables. On the first upper floor (terrace level) is an apartment with pull-down Murphy bed, kitchenette, and fireplace. On the top floor is the artist's studio that includes a cast iron heater, easel, paintbrush, and two works of Mondrian-style Modernist art. This is a nod to the fact that the original Lego brick color palette of red, blue, yellow, black, and white were chosen based on Mondrian's art. Outside the upper floor stairs lead down to the roof terrace for diners lined with hanging lanterns and flowers. This set also includes hard-to-find white croissants and brick elements in olive green, dark blue, and dark red. Advanced exterior details include façade with croissant detailing, sidewalk, bench, scooter, and a dumpster and trash can at the back. The set includes five minifigures.

=== Detective's Office (2015) ===
The Detective's Office (set number: 10246) is the tenth set in the Modular Building line and was released on 1 January 2015. This set contains 2262 pieces. It contains a detective's office, a barbershop named "Al's", a billiards table "pool" room, and an upstairs detective's office with a corridor. The "Al's" sign resembles the various brick-built lettering signs from the Pet Shop, Town Hall, and Fire Brigade. The featured "Pool" sign uses a building technique never used before. The interior of the pool room features a fan, a pool table, and a dart board. The detective's office features clues, a cabinet, and a secret storage space behind a picture. The barbershop features a mirror, scissors, lights, and chairs for customers. The apartment holds an old-style toilet and a small kitchen. This Modular varies from previous buildings in that it introduced play features of a secretive or "illicit" nature: it has secret compartments that allow cookie smuggling throughout the building. It is also different because it is the first Modular to have two buildings on the same baseplate. The front of the building features a newspaper stand, a tree, and two balconies. It includes six minifigures.

=== Brick Bank (2016) ===
Brick Bank (set number: 10251) is the eleventh set in the Modular Building line and is the shortest Modular in height, the fourth block corner building, and the first corner building to not feature a direct-corner entrance. It was released on 1 January 2016. This set contains 2380 pieces. Like the Palace Cinema, it contains only two furnished floors, although it also has higher-than-normal ceilings like the Cinema.

The Brick Bank features a bank, a secretary's office, a bank manager's office, a laundromat, and a detailed façade and sidewalk. The bank features an atrium foyer with a wide, arched entrance, triangular-patterned floor tiling, an ornate chandelier, an oxidized-copper colored skylight, a transaction counter with hidden alarm buttons and security glass, and a bank vault with safe deposit boxes and a large round door. The laundromat features a printed window, tiled floor, and four laundry machines—one of which contains a play feature for "laundering money": placing Lego money bills or coin elements through this machine will fall into a special deposit box inside the bank's vault. The rooftop also has another play feature for a robber to descend the chimney by rope and exit through a special entrance atop the bank vault. The secretary's office features a wall clock, desk, typewriter, a cabinet with opening drawers, a fireplace, and an espresso machine. The bank manager's office features a large desk with a banker's lamp and approval stamp, a leather-look chair, a printed portrait, a statue, and a cabinet. It includes five minifigures.

The Brick Bank also introduced some rare elements, such as a metalized-paint gold ingot and coins, and the less-common colors of Sand Blue and Sand Green.

=== Assembly Square (2017) ===
Assembly Square (set number: 10255) is the twelfth set in the Modular Building line. It was released on 1 January 2017. This set was, at the time, the largest of all Lego modular buildings, containing more pieces than any previous Modular set at 4002 pieces. This set also includes the most minifigures: nine when including an infant figure (a dentist, barista, baker, florist, music store assistant, dancer, photographer, and a LEGO fan, plus a baby figure).

The Assembly Square ground level features a bakery with counter, cash register, shelves, opening oven, wedding cake and assorted buildable pastries and treats; a florist's shop with counter, cash register, garden tools, flower arrangements, bouquets and a blue and yellow macaw parrot element; and a café with an espresso machine, counter, bench seating and pie elements. The middle level features a music store with a buildable drum set, two guitars, and a saxophone element; a photo studio with an "antique" large-format bellows camera atop an adjustable tripod; and a dental office with a buildable reclining chair, waiting area, telephone, and a sink. The upper level features a dance studio with a built-in piano and reflective mirror element; an apartment with buildable foldout sofa bed, detailed kitchen, toilet, micro Lego train, modular buildings, and an Eiffel Tower, and access to a rooftop terrace with a buildable barbecue, table, and a neglected plant.

This set marked the tenth anniversary of the Modular building sets and contains numerous "easter egg" references in the set's use of brick elements, colors, and architectural details used in Modular sets released over the previous years. It measures over 13 in (33 cm) high, 15 in (38 cm) wide and 10 in (25 cm) deep. This is 1.5 times wider than the usual modular building width.

=== Downtown Diner (2018) ===
Downtown Diner (set number: 10260) is the thirteenth set in the Modular Building line. It was released on 1 January 2018 and contains 2480 pieces. This building reintroduces the teal color (what Lego calls Bright Blueish Green) that had not been in production since 2008. The first level of this building is a 1950s-style diner. It has a curved front window, red bar stools, a classic bubbler-style jukebox, soda fountain-equipped counter, and an open-plan kitchen.

The middle level has a gym with a boxing ring, punching bag, and weight training room. The upper-level houses a recording studio, complete with a vocal booth, mixing desk, and a cabinet for refreshments.

The façade of the building features pink-and-teal 20th-century Art Deco styling with a large pink "DINER" sign. Though Streamline Moderne style architecture first emerged in the 1930s, this modular has a more 1950s-style color treatment than the general era of previous Modulars (~1930s). Other external features include arched linteled windows, balconies, a wrought iron-style exterior staircase, and a detailed sidewalk complete with mailbox, parking meter, flower pots, and the iconic white streetlamp of the Modular collection. It is the third Modular set to include a vehicle: a 1950s-style convertible automobile recalling an homage to Elvis Presley's pink Cadillac. One of the minifigures also features an Elvis-style of pompadour hairstyle.

For the first time since 2007's Market Street, the included six minifigures have individual, varied faces rather than the classic Lego smiley faces used in the previous sets. Subsequent Modular Buildings continued to use these stylized faces. The set measures over 13 in (33 cm) high, 10 in (25 cm) wide and 10 in (25 cm) deep.

=== Corner Garage (2019) ===
Corner Garage (set number: 10264) is the fourteenth modular building and the fifth corner building, released in January 2019. It has 2569 pieces. The building resembles that of a 1950s-style American building, much like the Downtown Diner. The ground level has a gas station with a fuel pump, kiosk, and a vehicle workshop with a roll-up door, vehicle lift, and tire mounter. The mid-level has a veterinarian's office owned by a character named "Dr. Jones" with an examination table, a fish tank, and a waiting area with a sofa. The upper level has an apartment with a kitchen, TV, sofa, bed, and a staircase that leads to a rooftop terrace with a sun lounger, parasol, and flower garden. The set also includes a scooter, tow truck, and six minifigures, as well as a bunny, parrot, dog, frog, and fish pieces. Instead of the usual blocky-structure corner buildings offered, the set produces a 45-degree angle cut at the front. The set measures over 12 inches (30 cm) high, 10 inches (25 cm) wide, and 10 inches (25 cm) deep.

=== Bookshop (2020) ===
Bookshop (set number: 10270) is the fifteenth set in the Modular Building line, released in January 2020. The set comes with 2,504 pieces. The set consists of two separate buildings akin to the Pet Shop, making it the second set in the series that is actually two buildings that separate. The model features the "Birch Books" bookstore and an accompanying townhouse. The set is a return to more classical and European architecture from the last two more modern American modular designs, Downtown Diner and Corner Garage. An autumn setting is portrayed throughout the set through the use of warm-colored leaves and the attire of the minifigures. The Bookshop was created by Lego designer Wes Talbott, who said the model was inspired by the houses of Amsterdam and the dollhouses that were built by his mother. The set measures over 11 inches (28 cm) high, 10 inches (25 cm) wide, and 10 inches (25 cm) deep.

The Bookshop's ground floor features a birch tree with several new colors of foliage elements, as well as a display window and store in medium nougat and light grey colors. The first floor features decorative white windows, a reading room with a grandfather clock, a lamp, and a sitting chair. The top floor of the bookshop has a dark red roof with light grey architectural details. The townhouse is built above a crawl-space basement with a staircase, garden, and a lamp post. The first floor is teal with white accents and features a bay window, dining table, and living area, while the roof has a complex build involving a varied roof line, dark blue tiling, and dark grey top. The back part of the roof of each building breaks away to reveal two small bedrooms. The Bookshop comes with five minifigures and several mini-builds featuring a bookshelf with a printed "Moby Brick" book cover, a four-poster bed, lamp, grandfather clock, and toy plane, as well as a bluebird and chameleon element in new colors. The five minifigures include a shopkeeper with glasses, an older man with grey hair, a young boy in a flannel jacket and lime green scarf, a woman with a purple top, and a man with suspenders and a tie.

=== Police Station (2021) ===
On 27 November 2020, the 2021 modular building was revealed as being a large three-story police station with a donut shop and newspaper stand on the sides. Police Station (set number: 10278) is the sixteenth set in the Modular Building line and was released on 1 January 2021. The set has 2,923 pieces and 5 minifigures, including 2 1950s era male police officers and 1 female police captain, female donut shop employee, and a male newsstand operator/the donut thief. It measures over 14.5 inches (37 cm) high (including antennae), 10 inches (25 cm) wide, and 10 inches (25 cm) deep.

The side of the building features a large poster for "Soap Suds", a reference to the laundromat featured in the Brick Bank set. On either side of the station are a donut shop and a newspaper kiosk. The station consists of an evidence locker, jail cell, interrogation room, detective's office, mugshots room, and a bathroom. In the rear of the Police Station, there is also a reference to the American sitcom, Brooklyn Nine-Nine. Above the donut shop is an apartment with a kitchenette, a record player, a rug, and a bed. The set contains hidden features such as a bed that is hinged to reveal an opening in the floor providing access to the donut shop below, and the floor in the jail cell can be lifted to reveal a spoon and a tunnel leading to the rear of the building with a crack on the exterior.

=== Boutique Hotel (2022) ===
Celebrating the fifteenth anniversary of the modular building series is the Boutique Hotel and the sixth corner building. It is the 17th building in the Modular Building series. Released on 1 January 2022, the Boutique Hotel (set number: 10297) is a three-story corner building that encompasses a hotel and an art gallery. The set has 3066 pieces and seven minifigures, including two hotel staff, a woman, a businessman, a backpacker, a coffee cart worker, and a staff member from the art gallery next door to the hotel. The modular measures over 13 in (33 cm) high, 10 in (25 cm) wide and 10 in (25 cm) deep.

The gallery next to the hotel includes several pieces of art, while the main building encompasses a lobby/reception with a check-in desk, a vase with flowers, and a large sofa. The second floor encompasses two guest rooms, while the third floor room includes a larger space and a detailed bathroom. A patio is accessed via stairs between the hotel and the art gallery and is topped with a potted palm tree, seating, and a small serving bar. The building is topped with a curved skylight, and brick-built accessories include a luggage cart and a coffee stand.

=== Jazz Club (2023) ===
On 14 December 2022, the 2023 modular building was revealed as being a Jazz Club (set number: 10312), making it the 18th building in the Modular Building series. It includes a pizzeria, a managerial office, a tailor's workshop, a dressing room, and a rooftop greenhouse. The set has 2899 pieces and eight minifigures, including a drummer, pizza chef, bass player, club owner, tailor, jazz singer, magician, and pizza delivery driver. The modular measures over 12 in (30 cm) high, 10 in (25 cm) wide and 10 in (25 cm) deep.

=== Natural History Museum (2024) ===
Announced on 30 October 2023, and released on 1 December 2023, the Natural History Museum (set number: 10326) is the nineteenth modular building and the largest so far by part count, consisting of 4,014 pieces. This building is also tied with Assembly Square as the widest modular building, as both sets are 1.5 times wider than the other buildings; dimensions: over 15 in (38 cm) wide and 10 in (25 cm) high.

The Natural History Museum contains seven minifigures, consisting of a window washer, two museum employees, the museum's curator, and two visitors.

The building's exterior is colored in olive green and includes a large portico supported by two large pillars, as well as a cherry blossom tree. The first floor of the museum contains exhibits on paleontology, including several fossils and a brontosaurus skeleton that extends into the second floor. The second floor contains several space-themed exhibits that contain references to the Classic Space theme, as well as displays that reference past Lego themes. The roof contains a small office for the museum's curator.

=== Tudor Corner (2025) ===
To mark the twentieth set in the line, the Tudor Corner (set number: 10350) was announced on 3 December 2024, and released on 1 January 2025, reverting to the previous release schedule after the previous modular building was released in the previous December. Based on traditional British and Tudor architecture, the set measures 13 in (33 cm) high, 10 in (25 cm) wide, and 10 in (25 cm) deep and contains 3266 pieces, including eight minifigures.

The Tudor Corner was one of the first sets to include a Hidden Disabilities Sunflower Lanyard as part of a new initiative to support inclusive play.

=== Shopping Street (2026) ===
The Shopping Street (set number: 11371) was revealed on 4 December 2025, and released on 1 January 2026.

The set measures 14 in (36 cm) high, 10 in (25 cm) wide, and 10 in (25 cm) deep and contains 3456 pieces, including seven minifigures: two children with matching band outfits (including a hat bearing the Billund crest, as already seen on the pediment of the Town Hall), their mother, a female carpenter, a furniture mover, the music shop manager and a plumber.

Layout includes ornate buildings with angled walls, a central alleyway, a fountain plaza, a music shop, a furniture shop and a wood workshop. The tallest building's exterior is sand green and white, with a dark blue roof. The other building is dark orange and dark tan.

== Related sets ==
=== Mini Modulars ===
Lego Designer Jamie Berard created many Modulars Buildings and decided to make a mini version of his set for fun. Five of these were then released as a single set 10230 containing 1,356 pieces, each one on an 8x8 baseplate, making them quarter-scale with respect to the original buildings. Initially, this set was for Lego Group VIPs only, but it later became available for general sale.

In October 2014, four sets similar to the Mini Modulars were released as Toys "R" Us exclusives. They are 40180 (Bricktober Theater), 40181 (Bricktober Pizza Place), 40182 (Bricktober Fire Station), and 40183 (Bricktober Town Hall). Despite the similarity of names, they are not mini versions of existing modular buildings; they are new designs. They are simpler builds than the original Mini Modulars, based on 6x8 plates, and each one includes two vehicles; the target age is given as 7 and up.

In October 2015, four new sets were released for Toys "R" Us Bricktober. They are 40141 – Bricktober Hotel (204 pcs), 40142 – Bricktober Train Station (180 pcs), 40143 -Bricktober Bakery (234 pcs), 40144 – Bricktober Toys "R" Us store (165 pcs). This time, the base is 8x8 and 8x10. As last time, they each include two vehicles.

=== Batman ===
LEGO has released at least one large Batman-themed set that include the same pin connecting feature that the Modulars have, allowing them to be easily mixed in. These include 76300 (Arkham Asylum).

=== Marvel ===
LEGO has released several large Marvel sets that include the same pin connecting feature that the Modulars have, allowing them to be easily mixed in. These include 76178 (Daily Bugle), based on the Spider-Man comics, 76218 (Sanctum Sanctorum) and 76269 (Avengers Tower), based on the Marvel Cinematic Universe, and 76294 (The X-Mansion), based on X-Men '97.

=== Ninjago ===
LEGO has also released several Ninjago City sets that can be connected to the Modular buildings. These include 70620 (Ninjago City), 70657 (Ninjago City Docks), 71741 (Ninjago City Gardens), 71799 (Ninjago City Markets), and 71837 (Ninjago City Workshops).

== Timeline ==
Timeline

== Challenges ==
A challenge faced by the designers of the earlier sets is that they were not able to work with the full palette of Lego bricks and colors ever produced when designing. Instead, they were limited to the bricks and colors currently in production by Lego at the time of the product design. As an example, for Café Corner, the designer wanted to include a bicycle piece in the set, but at the time, the machine that made bicycle pieces was broken. It had to be fixed for the designer to be able to include the piece in his design. With Market Street, the fan designer was limited to only the bricks and color combinations available as 'active components,' meaning bricks that were already in production. No new bricks could be introduced. This requirement has since been removed. The designers of the Downtown Diner were able to reintroduce a retired color, Bright Bluish Green, and Police Station was able to introduce a new mold, the 1x3 inverted arch brick.

There have been scheduling challenges faced in the design of the Modular Houses sets. For the Green Grocer set, the designer believed that the set could have benefited from another design iteration before release. The detailed nature of these sets requires a greater amount of design time than a normal Lego set. It is expected that future sets in the series will not suffer from such schedule pressures.

During the design of Café Corner (and presumably with the other sets in the series), the designer had to work closely with the building instructions team due to some of the "unorthodox techniques" that he used "which have not been tried before in official Lego sets."

The reason interiors were not included in the first two models in the series, Café Corner and Market Street, was that they could not be seen in the pictures included on the packaging. Once the success of Modular Buildings sets had been proven with these first two sets, for the third set, Green Grocer, the designer was allowed to include interior details in each of the floors. As a result, many of the interior details of later sets, such as Green Grocer, are not visible on the box and are only discovered while building the set. However, the boxes of each set feature some of the interior details, such as the escalators inside Grand Emporium and the pool table inside the Detective's Office.

== Reception ==
The Modular Buildings series is viewed by Lego designers and fan sites as "toys for adults". Product reviews have been very positive, with the biggest criticisms being price and degree of difficulty. With Café Corner, one reviewer complained that the interior of the building was bare of any finishing. This complaint was addressed in later models such as Green Grocer, which had finished interior details included in each of its three floors.

When the first set in the series, Café Corner, was released, the designer indicated that more sets would follow in the series only if sales of the first set were successful. In a later interview in 2008 covering the third set in the series, Green Grocer, the designer indicated that sales had been strong enough to support four sets in the series (referring to the planned 2009 release of Fire Brigade as the fourth set).

== See also ==
- Lego Design byME
- Lego Creator
- Lego Icons
