= Lego Loco =

1998 video game

- Developer: Intelligent Games
- Publisher: Lego Media
- Director: Kevin Shrapnell
- Producer: Matthew Stibbe / Dee Jarvis (Team Leader)
- Programmers: Simon Evers; Bruce Heather; Suzanne Maddison; Philip Veale; Daniel Wheeler
- Artists: Cornelis E. Gajentaan; Dee Jarvis
- Composer: Richard Joseph
- Platform: Microsoft Windows
- Release: 11 November 1998
- Genre: Simulation
- Modes: Single-player, multiplayer

Lego Loco is a Lego-branded simulation game for Microsoft Windows, released in November 1998. It is a simple open-ended construction game with an emphasis on rail transport. The aim of the game is to construct a town in which Lego minifigures can live. This was the first game released by Lego Media, the publishing division of The Lego Group that was founded after the commercial success of Mindscape's Lego Island.

== Development ==
Following the success of Lego Island, The Lego Group was still cautious about entering the gaming market, believing it could hurt or even overtake their toy sales. Around this time, the company formed their own publishing division, Lego Media International, whose goal was to work with outside developers and further explore ideas for Lego games. The first three titles developed under this initiative were Lego Creator by Superscape, Lego Chess by Krisalis Software, and Lego Loco by Intelligent Games, all released on 11 November 1998.

The concept of Lego Loco was partially inspired by an internal project from Intelligent Games, known as SNM Slave, where players could control a character who lived on their computer desktop. The company later realized that due to its inherently edgy nature, the concept wouldn't work as a marketable product, so they attempted to rework the idea of an interactable object on a desktop into something else, with the idea eventually evolving into a buildable Lego train set that would drive around the desktop screen, known as Lego Desktop Railway.

Eventually, the project expanded into its own program that ran in a separate window instead of on the desktop and grew beyond the original train concept. Programmer Suzanne Maddison suggested the name change to Lego Loco, as she felt something more poetic would better reflect the game.

== Gameplay ==
Gameplay in Lego Loco

At the start of the game, the player is bestowed with a "Toy Box", from which they can select different parts from lists and place them directly into the space provided. They can place down roads, railway lines, stations, crossings, buildings, and scenery. To start the simulation, the player must close the Toy Box, and the town will come to life (though the player can open it again to make changes, save the town, or open a new one). After a while Lego minifigures will begin moving into the houses provided (if any), and the player can, like with ordinary figures, pick them up and place them elsewhere. This can affect the figure's mood, depending on where it's placed.

Using the train house (engine shed), the player can create trains to run on the railway lines. If a train has passenger carriages it will stop at any stations that have been placed alongside the track. The player can control the train's speed and direction and add a mail carriage to the train, thus enabling it to stop at post offices and carry postcards that have been created by the player. The train or trains can also go through tunnels that the player can place at the edge of the map, and some tunnels can be used to help exchange postcards with other players (provided a network has been set).

== Reception ==
Reception

Review scores
Publication	Score
PC Gamer (UK)	18%
The Daily Telegraph	4/5

Lego Loco was generally well received with it having been awarded two noteworthy accolades: CODIE Software Publishers Association Excellence in Software Awards - Best New Strategy and Simulation Software, and PIN Quality Mark Gold Award - Parents Information Network.

Aaron Curtiss from the Los Angeles Times said in his review that "Lego Loco is a mess. The intent was to give kids a virtual railroad to build and run. What they get is a game that made me want to tie myself to the tracks". PC Gamer's Jonathan Davies called Lego Loco a "crude version of Railroad Tycoon", saying it lacked any game structure and barely resembled actual Lego train sets.
