= Lego Knights' Kingdom =

2004 video game

- European box art
- Developer: Razorback Developments
- Publisher: THQ
- Composers: Allister Brimble; Anthony N. Putson
- Platform: Game Boy Advance
- Release: NA: 4 October 2004; EU: 8 October 2004
- Genre: Action-adventure
- Modes: Single-player, multiplayer

Lego Knights' Kingdom is an action-adventure video game based on the Lego toy brand. It was developed by Razorback Developments and published in October 2004 by THQ for the Game Boy Advance handheld system. It was the second game based on the Knights' Kingdom theme, after Lego Creator: Knights' Kingdom. However, that game was based on the first version of Knights' Kingdom, while the GBA game is based on the second version.

== Gameplay ==
Knights' Kingdom is a top-down perspective action-adventure game for the Game Boy Advance. The player controls one of four characters, with only one character being controlled at a time. The character run through a series of nine levels, attacking Shadow Knights and solving tasks along the way. The player collects shields in levels as a form of health: upon being hit by an enemy or harmful obstacle, the player's health will deteriorate. Upon dying, the player will fall back onto the ground.

The game also includes a tournament arena mode, where the characters compete against each other in three modes: Hand to Hand Combat, Jousting and Sword Lightning Combat. In tournament mode, the player can play as one of five knights from the Knight's Kingdom action figure line: Jayko, a blue-armored knight with a hawk crest; Danju, a purple-armored knight with a wolf crest; Rascus, a green-armored knight with a monkey crest; Santis, a red-armored knight with a bear crest; and Lord Vladek, the black-armored antagonist who bears a scorpion crest. Vladek, unlike the other knights, must be manually unlocked.

== Development and release ==
Knights' Kingdom was developed by Razorback Developments and published by THQ. THQ announced the game in a press release on 29 April 2004. It was released on 4 October that year in North America and four days later in Europe.

== Reception ==
Reception

Aggregate scores
Aggregator	Score
GameRankings	64.00%
Metacritic	62%

Review scores
Publication	Score
GameZone	7.0/10
Nintendo Power	56/100
Nintendojo	6.8/10
GamerFeed	3/5
GotNext	3/5

Knights' Kingdom received mixed reviews from critics, with respective scores of 62% and 64% at review aggregators Metacritic and GameRankings.
