= Fight Club (video game) =

2004 video game

- Developers: Genuine Games; Superscape (Mobile)
- Publisher: Vivendi Universal Games (Note: Released in PAL regions under the Sierra Entertainment brand name)
- Platforms: PlayStation 2 Xbox; Mobile phone
- Release: PlayStation 2, Xbox: NA: November 16, 2004; EU: December 10, 2004; Mobile: NA: January 26, 2005 (2D); NA: February 1, 2006 (3D)
- Genre: Fighting
- Modes: Single player, multiplayer

Fight Club is a 2004 fighting video game based on the film of the same name. It was developed by Genuine Games and published by Vivendi Universal Games for the PlayStation 2 and Xbox on November 16, 2004 in North America and on December 10, 2004 in PAL regions.

== Gameplay ==
Fight Club contains gameplay and visual elements found in several notable sixth-generation 3D fighting games, such as multi height-zone targeting combos consisting of heavily reused strikes found in Tekken 4; the localized damaged system in which limbs can be permanently damaged found in Tao Feng: Fist of the Lotus; the wall throws, height-zone specific counters, and stage transitions found in Dead or Alive 3; the environmental usage found in Mortal Kombat: Deception; and the overall realism (Such as a lack of juggling), heavy, high-recovery move kinaesthetics, and gritty, grimy, urban aesthetic found in titles such as Def Jam: Fight for NY. In a side-view, players control one of two characters who perform various fighting moves until one is beaten. Fight Club structures the formula around the premise of the movie, where two men meet secretly to fight each other into submission. Players fight as one of the 12 original characters from the novel and movie, including Tyler Durden and Robert (Bob) Paulson.

Fight Club sports the gritty feel of the movie with injuries inflicted on players and blood splattering everywhere, including onto the screen. The game also introduces many new features into the fighting game genre. In Hardcore mode, injuries are carried over from one fight to another, which could lead to the player being so injured that they are forced to retire (although this mode only applies to custom-made characters). The game also goes into mini-cutscenes showing X-rays of the character to display bones being broken. Fighting moves are intended to be brutally violent, such as one where the opponent's arm is visibly broken at the elbow. Levels are designed around scenes from the movie, such as Lou's bar and Paper Street.

In Story mode, an original character (named only Protagonist) decides to join Fight Club after breaking up with his girlfriend. By winning fights, the character moves up through the ranks of Fight Club, getting closer to Project Mayhem and becoming Tyler Durden's right-hand man. The story diverges from the movie and novel in several ways to accommodate the new character. Completing Story mode also unlocks Fred Durst, lead singer of Limp Bizkit, as a playable character, as per the singer's own stated demands that he becomes a playable character in any video game licensing music from his band.

Fight Club also supported online multiplayer. The Xbox version of the game had the ability to download extra content through Xbox Live

== Reception ==
Reception

Aggregate scores
Aggregator	Score		
Aggregator	mobile	PS2	Xbox
GameRankings	N/A	36.84%	40.11%
Metacritic	N/A	36/100	37/100

Review scores
Publication	Score		
Publication	mobile	PS2	Xbox
1Up.com	N/A	D−	D−
Electronic Gaming Monthly	N/A	2.5/10	2.5/10
Game Informer	N/A	5.5/10	5.5/10
GameRevolution	N/A	F	F
GameSpot	4.4/10	3.7/10	3.7/10
GameSpy	N/A	2/5	2/5
GameZone	N/A	5/10	5/10
IGN	(2D) 6.3/10 (3D) 4.1/10	4.5/10	4.5/10
Official U.S. PlayStation Magazine	N/A	1.5/5	N/A
Official Xbox Magazine (US)	N/A	N/A	6.4/10

Upon release, Fight Club was met with negative reception. GameRankings and Metacritic gave it a score of 40.11% and 37 out of 100 for the Xbox version, and 36.84% and 36 out of 100 for the PlayStation 2 version.

The game has mostly been dismissed by fans of both the novel and movie as an attempt to milk the success of the story for commercial gain; it was also universally panned by critics on its own merits. Critics say the game copies too much from other fighting games without bringing much new to the genre, and has repetitive fighting moves and poor animation. GameSpot gave the Mobile version a score of 4.4 out of ten and stated that the experience "lacks in so many ways that it's hard for it to even hold a candle to its namesake. The game is short, very easy, and the attack system is needlessly diverse. Regardless of your interest in the subject matter, Fight Club is most definitely not your kind of game." IGN gave the same version a score of 6.3 out of 10 and said that it "may only cost about four bucks to play, but I can tell you there are too many better ways to spend four bucks now." However, the same site gave its 3D version a score of 4.1 out of 10 and stated that it "just isn't a very good game. The fighting mechanics are just too shallow, and we've now seen with Brady Bunch Kung Fu and Medieval Combat, that fun brawling is indeed possible on a cellphone. Couple the dull game play with some bugs, and I cannot reasonably recommend Fight Club to anybody, no matter how much of a Space Monkey they are."

The game failed to achieve commercial success. Nevertheless, it was ranked fourth in Electronic Gaming Monthly's list of the top ten video game politicians for Abraham Lincoln's appearance in Fight Club for the PlayStation 2. Game Informer placed Fight Club at number ten in a 2011 list of "Top Ten Fighting Games We'd Like to Forget".
