= Warhammer 40,000: Glory in Death =

2006 video game

- North American box cover
- Developer: Razorback Developments
- Publisher: THQ
- Series: Warhammer 40,000
- Platform: N-Gage
- Release: NA: April 6, 2006
- Genre: Turn-based strategy
- Modes: Single-player, multiplayer

Warhammer 40,000: Glory in Death is a turn-based strategy video game for the N-Gage, produced by THQ. It is based on the Warhammer 40,000 universe by Games Workshop and is known for being one of the last games released for the console in North America.

The game includes four playable races, all of which feature in the campaign mode. There is also a skirmish mode for short, random battles. Two-player mode is supported through Bluetooth and N-Gage Arena.

== Reception ==
Reception

Review score
Publication	Score
Pocket Gamer	4/5

Pocket Gamer gave Glory in Death 4 stars out of 5, concluding, "...if you're a [Warhammer 40K] fan or someone who's after a tougher challenge than that offered by the Pathway to Glory games, Warhammer 40,000: Glory in Death really is a perfect strategy swan-song for the current N-Gage."
