= Do3D =

Do3D was one of the first virtual reality computer software programs released for Microsoft Windows, being the first consumer product released by Superscape in 1998.

The purpose of the program was to create your own virtual worlds, with the option of sharing them on webpages with special plug-ins, and the ability to explore them by walking around. It used low-polygon, simple 3D graphics, with the possibility of adding your own textures and colors into pre-made objects, or into construction blocks for custom buildings.

Its dedicated website, Do3D.com, is now offline. The "robots.txt" file present on the website's server prevented the pages from being archived by the Wayback Machine.
