= Razorback Developments =

British video game developer

Razorback Developments Limited
- Company type: Private limited company
- Industry: Video games
- Founded: 17 March 2004; 21 years ago
- Founder: David Leitch; Jeff Tawney; Cameron Sheppard; Chris Walsh
- Defunct: 24 July 2012; 13 years ago
- Fate: Dissolved
- Headquarters: Lewes, East Sussex, England
- Products: Video games

Razorback Developments Limited was a British video game developer based in Lewes, East Sussex that specialised in creating handheld games. Founded on 17 March 2004 by David Leitch, Jeff Tawney, Cameron Sheppard and Chris Walsh, Razorback was set up initially to create a series of licensed games on the Game Boy Advance for the publisher THQ. It then focused on developing a collection of licensed and original games for the Nintendo DS.

The studio created 12 titles in total, across various handheld formats. It was nominated for "Best Handheld Games Studio" in the 2006 Develop Industry Excellence Awards.

The company ceased trading in March 2012.

== Games created by Razorback Developments ==
- Hot Wheels: Stunt Track Challenge (published by THQ on GBA) – 2004
- Lego Knights' Kingdom (published by THQ on GBA) – 2004
- Bionicle: Maze of Shadows (published by THQ on GBA) – 2005
- Fairly Odd Parents: Clash With The Anti-World (published by THQ on GBA) – 2005
- Alex Rider: Stormbreaker (published by THQ on GBA) – 2006
- Warhammer 40,000: Glory in Death (published by THQ on N-Gage) – 2006
- Xiaolin Showdown (published by Konami/Warner Bros on DS) – 2007
- Dr Reiner Knizia's Brainbenders (known in the US as Brain Voyage) (published by Eidos on DS) – 2008
- Bella Sara (published by Codemasters on DS) – 2008
- The Chase: Felix meets Felicity (published by Atari on DS) – 2009
- Dragonology (published by Codemasters on DS) – 2009
- Tap & Teach: The Story of Noah's Ark (published by Southpeak on DS) – 2010
