= Lego Icons =

Lego theme

LEGO Icons
- Other names: LEGO Exclusives (2000–2012); LEGO Creator Expert (2013–2021)
- Sub‑themes: adidas, aviation & maritime, book nooks, buildings, Castle System, Dune, Fairground Collection, Friends, gaming, Gardens of the World, How to Train Your Dragon, Modular Buildings Collection, pirates, Queer Eye, Restaurants of the World, space, Space System, The Lord of the Rings, The Simpsons, trains, Transformers, vehicles, Vestas, Winter Village Collection
- Subject: Advanced Models
- Availability: 2000–present
- Total sets: 145
- Official website

Lego Icons (formerly known as Lego Creator Expert) is a series of Lego construction toys aimed at a demographic of adolescents and adults. Beginning in 2000 without an established logo or icon, Lego Icons features models such as aircraft, sculptures, and world buildings, selling as exclusives with numerous specialized elements and complex building techniques. Icons is considered a challenge to both the target audience and Lego designers. All Icons sets are classified into specified sub-themes; however, the entirety of Icons is classified as a sub-theme of Lego Creator.

== Overview ==
=== Background ===
Advanced Lego models began being featured in the mid-1980s under the Lego Model Team subtheme (a subtheme of Lego System) and were discontinued in 1999 (with the exception of a re-release in 2004). Future advanced models received packaging without a logo and sold as Lego exclusives, beginning with the Statue of Liberty set in 2000. In this timeframe, multiple subthemes were released, such as the Modular Buildings Collection, a series of resident, retail, and restaurant buildings introduced in 2007; and the Winter Village Collection, a series of winter-holiday themed models, sometimes delving into deep fiction, introduced in 2009.

=== Lego Creator Expert ===
In 2013, advanced models were officially classified as under Lego Creator Expert, a sub-theme of Lego Creator, and received their own logo (which was updated multiple times in the future), beginning with 10233 Horizon Express. This established theme of advanced models was considered to help shape Lego Creator Expert’s reputation for unorthodox techniques and distant design from typical models, with some old exclusives receiving updated packaging and being merged into the newly created sub-theme.

=== Branding transition ===
On May 13, 2020, The Lego Group announced that they would retire the Lego Creator Expert branding and replace it with “18+” to make it easier for adults to see which sets are meant for their age range. The Lego Creator Expert theme remained, but boxes do not feature the logo and instead sport an all-black design.

On May 30, 2022, The Lego Group announced the Lego Creator Expert theme would be rebranded as Lego Icons in June 2022, in order to avoid confussion of other themes that begins introduced 18+ sets begins in this year, with new packaging debuting on January 1, 2023.

== Sub-themes ==
Even though most sub-themes are not official and are rather classified by the majority of the Lego community, some, such as the Modular Buildings Collection, are officially classified and recognized by The Lego Group.

=== Modular Buildings Collection ===
In April 2007, The Lego Group released 10182 Café Corner, the first modular building in the nearly 20-year-old collection. It included 2,056 pieces, and differed from the modular buildings released later in that its interior was empty. The set was followed by 10185 Green Grocer in 2008, now both the interior and the exterior detailed. The collection continued then with 10197 Fire Brigade in 2009, 10210 Grand Emporium in 2010, 10218 Pet Shop in 2011, 10224 Town Hall in 2012, 10232 Palace Cinema in 2013, 10243 Parisian Restaurant in 2014, 10246 Detective’s Office in 2015, 10251 Brick Bank in 2016, and 10255 Assembly Square, celebrating the 10th anniversary of the collection. These sets included minifigures with classic smiling face.

The modular building of 2018, 10260 Downtown Diner, included modern minifigure faces for the first time. It was followed by 10264 Corner Garage, 10270 Bookshop, 10278 Police Station, 10297 Boutique Hotel, 10312 Jazz Club, 10326 Natural History Museum, and 10350 Tudor Corner.

There are several patterns in the release of the sets:

- The first one, 10182 Café Corner, was a corner building, while 10185 Green Grocer and 10197 Fire Brigade were both not. The pattern that a corner building is followed by two non-corner ones has been maintained for all sets released since 2007.
- Nearly all of the modulars are built on 32×32 baseplates, except for 10255 Assembly Square and 10326 Natural History Museum, which are built on a 32×32 and a 16×32 baseplate.
- 10218 Pet Shop and 10270 Bookshop both consist of two separate buildings on 16×32 baseplates.

In 2012, 10230 Mini Modulars was released, including the mini versions of the first four modular buildings, plus 10190 Market Street.

Since 2022, gifts with purchase are also releasing for the buildings: 40532 Vintage Taxi for 2022, 40586 Moving Truck for 2023, 40681 Retro Food Truck for 2024, and 40757 Corner Kiosk for 2025.

=== Fairground Collection ===
On July 1, 2009, The Lego Group released 10196 Grand Carousel, a 3,263-piece set; in 2014, 10244 Fairground Mixer followed it with a more refined design language, and was not built on a baseplate. On June 1, 2015, 10247 Ferris Wheel launched; 10257 Carousel was the next one on June 1, 2017. The largest one yet, 10261 Roller Coaster, was released on June 1, 2018, including 4,124 pieces.

The Fairground Collection name was used officially for the first time in 10273 Haunted House in June 2020, retroactively including the previous sets Later on, 10273 Haunted House was launched in June 2020, with 10303 Loop Coaster releasing in July and 10303 Loop Coaster in July 2022.

All sets offer the builder the option to use additional Lego Power Functions or Lego Powered UP elements to enhance the playability of the set such as automation, music, and sound effects.

=== Winter Village Collection ===
In October 2009, 10199 Winter Toy Shop was released, establishing an annual sub-theme of the exclusive sets. 10216 Winter Village Bakery launched in 2010, followed by 10222 Winter Village Post Office in 2011, 10229 Winter Village Cottage in 2012, and 10235 Winter Village Market in 2013. The Lego Group offered something new with 10245 Santa’s Workshop, released on October 1, 2014. In 2015, they re-released the first set as 10249 Winter Toy Shop. 10254 Winter Holiday Train, the reiteration of 10173 Holiday Train, launched on October 1, 2016, with 10259 Winter Village Station following it on October 1, 2017. The set of 2018 was 10263 Winter Village Fire Station, and, in 2019, 10267 Gingerbread House was released for the 10th anniversary of the collection. 10275 Elf Club House, released on October 1, 2020, was a fantasy-themed set again, after 10245 Santa’s Workshop in 2014.

The Winter Village Collection set for 2021 was 10293 Santa’s Visit, which was similar to 10229 Winter Village Cottage from 2012. 10308 Holiday Main Street launched on October 7, 2022, and was the largest set at that time; 10325 Alpine Lodge broke the record in 2023, and is still has the highest piece count among Winter Village Collection sets. On October 4, 2024, 10339 Santa’s Post Office was released.

=== Botanical Collection ===
The Botanical Collection started in January 2021 with two sets, 10280 Flower Bouquet and 10281 Bonsai Tree. The third one was 10289 Bird of Paradise in June 2021. These were followed by 10309 Succulents and 10311 Orchid in 2022; the sets for 2023 were 10313 Wildflower Bouquet and 10314 Dried Flower Centerpiece. On December 1, 2023, 10329 Tiny Plants was released, with 10328 Bouquet of Roses launched one month later, on January 1, 2024. Two additional sets were released in August 2024: 10368 Chrysanthemum and 10369 Plum Blossom, and in October 2024, 10340 Wreath and 10370 Poinsettia also launched.

In November 2024, it was announced that the Botanical Collection would be spun off into its own line called Botanicals, with previous sets rebranded to the new line. The first official Botanicals set to not feature an 18+ age rating would be 10347 Petite Sunny Bouquet in May 2025.

=== Castle System ===
In August 2022, 10305 Lion Knights’ Castle was released among other 90 Years of Play sets, celebrating the 90th anniversary of The Lego Group. That summer, 40567 Forest Hideout also launched as a gift with purchase.

The next similar set, 10332 Medieval Town Square, arrived on March 4, 2024, although with a normal packaging design that most of the Lego Icons sets use.

=== Space System ===
On August 1, 2022, 10497 Galaxy Explorer, a 1,254-piece classic space set was launched, followed by a gift with purchase, 40580 Blacktron Cruiser, in January 2023.

Yet another one, 10355 Blacktron Renegade, was released on January 4, 2025, but with the standard packaging design for Lego Icons sets.

=== Gardens of the World ===
In November 2024, The Lego Group announced 10359 Fountain Garden, a 1,302-piece set scheduled for release on January 1, 2025. On the packaging, Gardens of the World appeared, creating a brand new sub-theme for Lego Icons.

=== Restaurants of the World ===
Similarly to Gardens of the World, another sub-theme, Restaurants of the World was established by the announcement of 10362 French Café in January 2025. The set contains 1,101 pieces and was released on March 1, 2025.

=== Vehicles ===
In 2008, an exclusive model, 10187 Volkswagen Beetle, was released, depicting a Volkswagen Beetle 1960 “Charlotte” model, followed by 10220 Volkswagen T1 Camper Van, with a more refined design, in 2011. After a two-year hiatus, the vehicle series returned with 10242 MINI Cooper in August 2014. In 2015, The Lego Group offered something different with 10248 Ferrari F40; in 2016, they revised the Beetle with 10252 Volkswagen Beetle. On August 1, 2017, 10258 London Bus was released, with no license to a real-life vehicle type, but capturing the iconic AEC Routemaster. The first vehicle based on a media franchise, 10262 James Bond Aston Martin DB5, launched on August 1, 2018. In 2019, two vehicles were released: 10265 Ford Mustang in March, and 10269 Harley-Davidson Fat Boy in August. On March 1, 2020, 10271 Fiat 500 became available, with a re-colored version, 77942 Fiat 500, released in September 2021 (in the United Kingdom only). 10274 Ghostbusters ECTO-1 arrived on November 15, 2020, followed by three vehicles in 2021: 10295 Porsche 911 on March 1, 10279 Volkswagen T2 Camper Van on August 1, and 10290 Pickup Truck on October 1. In March 2022, yet another motorcycle, 10298 Vespa 125 was released, and shortly after, 10300 Back to the Future Time Machine, including minifigures, too, also launched in April 2022. A third vehicle that year, 10304 Chevrolet Camaro Z28, was also released, in August. In 2023, there has been a decrease in the number of vehicles, as only two were released: 10317 Land Rover Classic Defender 90 on April 4 and 10321 Corvette on August 4. Something fresh arrived in 2024 with 10330 McLaren MP4/4 & Ayrton Senna, launched in March; it was followed by 10337 Lamborghini Countach 5000 Quattrovalvole in July 2024. Another Formula One race car and pilot, 10353 Williams Racing FW14B & Nigel Mansell, was released on March 1, 2025; after that, 10357 Shelby Cobra 427 S/C launched on July 4, 2025.

=== Buildings ===
The first building to release among Lego exclusives was 10181 Eiffel Tower; it had an incipient design, and its scale was 1:300. It was followed by the launch of 10189 Taj Mahal in October 2008. The series continued on with 10210 Tower Bridge in 2010, 10234 Sydney Opera House in 2013 and 10254 Big Ben in 2016. 10256 Taj Mahal was a re-release of 10189 Taj Mahal in 2017, with the only difference a brick separator being added. In 2020, a stadium, 10272 Old Trafford – Manchester United was released in February; 10276 Colosseum, which was the largest Lego set that time, also launched, on Black Friday 2020. On September 1, 2021, 10284 Camp Nou – FC Barcelona followed, with a gift with purchase, 40485 FC Barcelona Celebration; 10299 Real Madrid – Santiago Bernabéu Stadium was released on March 1, 2022. The latest building, 10307 Eiffel Tower, incorporating the second most pieces—10,001—of all Lego sets, launched on Black Friday 2022, and was accompanied by a gift with purchase, 40579 Eiffel’s Apartment.

=== Space ===
The Lego Group released an advanced space set in 2010, 10213 Shuttle Adventure, re-issued as 10231 Shuttle Expedition in 2011. On June 1, 2019, a licensed Lego Creator Expert space set launched: 10266 NASA Apollo 11 Lunar Lander; it was a detailed model of the lunar lander with minifigures and a base. 10283 NASA Space Shuttle Discovery, released in 2021, was another one with a piece count of 2,354. The next one arrived in 2024, as 10341 NASA Artemis Space Launch System, including 3,601 pieces, released on May 18. Another set was released on May 18, 2025: 10360 Shuttle Carrier Aircraft, including a Boeing aircraft and a space shuttle.

It was rumored that The Lego Group intended to release a set featuring SpaceX Falcon 9 with set number 10301 in April 2022; the set was canceled.

=== Trains ===
The first train aimed to adult collectors was 10173 Holiday Train, released in September 2006, and followed by 10194 Emerald Night in 2009. A cargo train, 10219 Maersk Train, also launched on April 1, 2011. 10233 Horizon Express, the first exclusive set to carry the Lego Creator Expert branding, arrived on January 1, 2013. After that, 2020 was the year when the next one released, 10277 Crocodile Locomotive, with a display stand accompanying the train.

=== Aviation and maritime ===
In 2006, Boeing 787 Dreamliner (set 10177) was released, as one of the earliest Lego exclusives. The next launched on January 1, 2010: Imperial Flagship (set 10210). 10226 Sopwith Camel was released in 2012; 10241 Maersk Line Triple-E was launched by The Lego Group in January 2014. They were followed by 10294 Titanic on November 8, 2021, then 10318 Concorde, a 2,083-piece set of the Airbus aircraft, on September 7, 2023, and finally, 10335 The Endurance, launched on Black Friday 2024; the latter had a gift with purchase, too: 40729 Shackleton’s Lifeboat.

=== Pirates ===
In July 2023, 10320 Eldorado Fortress was released, resembling 6276 Eldorado Fortress from 1989. Its packaging recalled the classic Lego themes with its yellow design, similarly to Castle System and Space System sets.

=== Queer Eye ===
In October 2021, The Lego Group released 10291 Queer Eye – The Fab 5 Loft, based on Queer Eye, a 2018 Netflix series.

=== Transformers ===
Hasbro and The Lego Group collaborated up in 2022 to release a Transformers Lego set, 10302 Optimus Prime; the model can be transformed and displayed both in robot mode and vehicle mode. It was followed up by 10338 Bumblebee in July 2024, and 10358 Soundwave in 2025. The latter features his cassette minions, Laserbeak and Ravage, and a sound brick.

=== The Lord of the Rings ===
The Lego Group renewed The Lord of the Rings license with launching 10316 The Lord of the Rings: Rivendell in March 2023. Including 6,167 pieces, it was a highly detailed diorama of the iconic locale from the movie trilogy. The next year, 10333 The Lord of the Rings: Barad-dûr was released, with a similarly high piece count. In 2025, 10354 The Lord of the Rings: The Shire also launched, though it was a medium-sized set with 2,017 pieces.

Since 2024, gifts with purchase also accompany the sets: 40693 The Lord of the Rings: Fell Beast in 2024 and 40761 The Lord of the Rings: Sméagol & Déagol in 2025.

=== Book nooks ===
In the summer of 2025, three book nook sets were released, including two as part of Lego Icons: 10351 Sherlock Holmes: Book Nook with 1,359 pieces and 10367 The Lord of the Rings: Balrog Book Nook with 1,201 pieces.

=== Other licensed sets ===
Various Lego sets based on Licensed properties have had large scale play and display sets released through the Lego Icons line:

- On Black Friday 2018, 4999 Vestas Wind Turbine was re-released as 10268 Vestas Wind Turbine, including 826 pieces and being able to be motorized with Lego Power Functions.
- In October 2021, The Lego Group released 10291 Queer Eye – The Fab 5 Loft, based on Queer Eye, a 2018 Netflix series.
- On June 1, 2021, 10292 The Friends Apartments launched, following 21319 Central Perk, a Lego Ideas set released in 2019. It included Rachel, Ross, Joey, Chandler, Monica, Phoebe, and Janice as minifigures.
- On July 1, 2021, 10282 adidas Originals Superstar launched, alongside a gift with purchase, 40486 adidas Originals Superstar. The set included a large-scale adidas shoe with a display stand, with a small shoe and a minifigure in the gift with purchase set.
- In July 2022, 10306 Atari 2600 was announced, featuring faux cartridges and dioramas of 3 games — Adventure, Asteroids, and Centipede, and a classic room display within the console.
- A similar set, 10323 PAC-MAN Arcade, was released in summer 2023, featuring a mechanical function in which characters from the games move around the board, and a room display on the back featuring a mini PAC-MAN machine.
- In February 2024, a 1,369-piece Lego set, 10327 Dune Atreides Royal Ornithopter was released, featuring the ornithopter and several minifigures of the characters from the franchise.
- A Lego Icons set incorporating special packaging design, 10391 Over the Moon with Pharrell Williams is based on the 2024 movie Piece by Piece; it consists of 966 pieces, and was released on September 20, 2024, a few weeks before the movie premiered in theaters on October 11, 2024.
- On May 13, 2025, The Simpsons line, which had been dormant since 2015's Kwik-E-Mart, was set to return with 10352 The Simpsons: Krusty Burger. The set includes 1,635 pieces and seven minifigures.
- On July 1, 2025, 10375 How to Train Your Dragon: Toothless was released to coincide with the 2025 live-action film, and features a chibi design.
- On September 1, 2026, 11386 SpongeBob SquarePants: Bikini Bottom was released.

There are several sets that do not fit in any of the sub-themes; they are the following:

- 10184 Town Plan was released in 2008 to celebrate 50 years of the Lego brick.
- 10315 Tranquil Garden, a 1,363-piece set, launched on August 1, 2023.
- 10331 Kingfisher Bird was released on February 1, 2024, and includes 834 pieces.
- 10334 Retro Radio, including 906 pieces, launched on June 4, 2024; it includes a sound brick.
- 10363 Leonardo da Vinci's Flying Machine, released on January 1, 2025, recreates da Vinci's famous invention with 493 pieces.

== Design ==
=== Challenges ===
Lego Icons designer Jamie Berard has commented multiple times on the challenges of set design. The Sydney Opera House set was mentioned as one of the most difficult sets to design, and past attempts had always resulted in failure.

Prior to that, Jamie Berard also mentioned Green Grocer was a difficult model to design, and became one of his favorites due to the set's result.

Café Corner was also commented as a difficult model to design due to piece limitation. The designer, Jamie Berard, wanted to add a bicycle piece into the set but the machine was temporarily broken, and he also had to work with instruction designers to implement set techniques onto the instructions since most were different from regular set design.

== Reception ==
Lego Icons has been received positively. Newsweek praised the Taj Mahal set, due to its design, construction, and high piece count. Also, a reviewer named Joe Meno pointed out that the Green Grocer modular building had clear instructions and “so many fun surprises and tricks used in the model.”

In March 2022, The Lego Group reported that the Lego City, Lego Technic, Lego Icons, Lego Harry Potter and Lego Star Wars themes had earned for the full year of 2021. Revenue for the year grew 27 percent versus 2020 to DKK 55.3 billion and consumer sales grew 22 percent over the same period, outpacing the toy industry and driving market share growth globally and in largest markets.

On 28 September 2022, The Lego Group reported that the Lego Star Wars, Lego Technic, Lego Icons (formerly Lego Creator Expert), Lego City, Lego Harry Potter and Lego Friends themes had earned for the six months ending 30 June 2022. Revenue for the period grew 17 percent to DKK 27.0 billion compared with the same period in 2021, driven by strong demand. Consumer sales grew 13 percent, significantly ahead of the toy industry, contributing to global market share growth.

In February 2023, Eiffel Tower, Titanic, Colosseum and Taj Mahal were listed on “The biggest Lego sets of all time” by Lego fan site Brick Fanatics.

In March 2023, The Lego Group reported that the Lego City, Lego Technic, Lego Icons, Lego Harry Potter and Lego Star Wars themes had earned for the full year of 2022. Revenue for the year grew 17 percent to DKK 64.6 billion and consumer sales grew 12 percent in 2022, achieving growth in all major market groups with especially strong performance in the Americas and Western Europe.

In August 2023, The Lego Group reported that the Lego Icons, Lego Star Wars, Lego Technic and Lego City themes had earned for the first six months of 2023. Revenue was DKK 27.4 billion, a growth of 1% compared with H1 2022. Consumer sales grew 3% outperforming a declining toy market and contributing to strong market share growth.

== Award and nominations ==
In 2019, Roller Coaster set was awarded “Toy of the Year” and also “Playset of the Year” by the Toy Association.

In 2022, Flower Bouquet (set number: 10280) was awarded “Toy of the Year” and also “Grown-Up Toy of the Year” by the Toy Association. Everyone is Awesome (set number: 40516) was awarded “Toy of the Year” and also “Specialty Toy of the Year” by the Toy Association. Everyone is Awesome (set number: 40516) also won British LGBT Awards for 2022.

In 2022, adidas Originals Superstar (set number: 10282) was awarded “Best Licensed Product” in the category “Toys, Games, Novelties (ages 8 and up)” by Licensing International in Las Vegas.

== See also ==
- Lego Architecture
- Lego Creator
- Lego Modular Buildings Collection
