= Lego Creator (video game) =

1998 video game

- Developer: Superscape
- Publisher: Lego Media
- Platform: Windows
- Release: 11 November 1998
- Genre: Sandbox
- Mode: Single-player

Lego Creator is a sandbox game developed by Superscape and published by Lego Media for Windows. The game allows players to assemble virtual Lego bricks and minifigures to create scenes. It was one of three Lego-themed video games released by the publisher at the end of 1998, alongside Lego Loco and Lego Chess.

Upon release, Lego Creator received mixed reviews, with critics praising the concept, but faulting its user interface, visuals, and performance, and remarking that the game was not as satisfying to play with as its physical counterpart. Following release, three sequels in a Lego Creator series were released, including Lego Creator: Knights' Kingdom in 2000.

== Gameplay ==
User interface of Lego Creator

Lego Creator is an open-ended sandbox video game with no objectives. The game allows players to construct virtual towns on a 3D plane using Lego elements. An onscreen Wizard assists players by verbally describing the features of the game. Players alternate between two modes: Build Mode and Play Mode.

In Build Mode, players select and assemble scenes from an unlimited number of bricks, minifigures, structures, and accessories. Bricks can be placed, rotated, or have their color changed. Pre-made buildings and vehicles can also be added to the scene.

In Play Mode, bricks and minifigures placed in the scene come to life. Action Bricks, for example, play lighting and sound effects such as police sirens.

The camera can be controlled in multiple ways. Players can use a free moving camera perspective which can be adjusted for direction, altitude and speed. Cameras can also be built as pieces in the town allowing for players to see the scene in a fixed perspective. Players can also select minifigures and vehicles and see from their perspective.

== Development and release ==
Lego Creator was published by Lego Media, a division of the Lego Group established in 1996. Lego Media expanded its number of employees following the success of Lego Island in 1997. The game was released on 11 November 1998, alongside two other games: Lego Loco and Lego Chess. The release of all three games was intended as an entry into the Christmas 1998 market.

The game was pitched as a flagship title to imitate play with the toy in a virtual space, with division managing director Mark Livingstone stating it was designed with no right, wrong, or prescribed way to play as part of its design philosophy. According to executive producer Rob Smith, the game was partially inspired the earlier work of the company's Strategic Product Unit, which had created a digital archives of Lego parts in collaboration with Silicon Graphics. However, these models were too detailed to add to the game, so they were recreated by London-based developer Superscape. Smith stated a key challenge in developing Lego Creator was designing controls and a user interface that would be accessible for younger players. The game's interface went through multiple iterations and was extensively tested with children.

Lego Creator was showcased at the European Computer Trade Show in 1998, and was marketed with a television and print advertising campaign costing approximately $5-7 million. The game's packaging included the Lego minifigure "Biker Bob". Following the release of Lego Creator, Lego Media expanded its software lineup and announced four additional titles in 1999, which included the future games Lego Rock Raiders and Lego Racers.

== Reception ==
=== Sales ===
Research performed following the success of Lego Island suggested that Lego Creator would also be successful and a significant competitor to other major titles released during that time period.

According to PC Data, Lego Creator was the highest-selling home education software in North America in December 1998. It was also the third best-selling game in the United Kingdom in February 1999 according to ChartTrack and the ELSPA. Lego Media Marketing Director Gregg Sauter stated that the commercial success of Lego Creator was attributable to its higher minimum advertised price compared to other titles released by the company that year.

=== Critical reception ===
Reception

Review scores
Publication	Score
AllGame	2.5/5
PC Gamer (UK)	45%
APC	3.5/5
Children's Software Review	3.9/5
FamilyPC	85%
Personal Computer World	3/5
Sydney Morning Herald	3.5/5
Ultimate PC	62%

Lego Creator received mixed reviews upon release. Critics noted the being able to assemble lego bricks in an open-ended game was a novel idea with appeal, although several felt it to be a lesser substitute for playing with physical bricks. The Houston Chronicle felt the "experience, construction and exploration of worlds" was engrossing, although felt its design could make it frustrating to use. The Children's Software Review considered that Lego Creator appeared in reality more like a "town programming kit" than the limitless creation software implied by the title of the game, and PC Gamer UK wrote that whilst the accuracy of a virtual Lego system was "undeniably impressive", the concept was not as fun without the "tactile pleasure" of assembling bricks.

The user interface and design of Lego Creator received mixed opinions. Some praised its simplicity, with APC finding its design to be "simple and consistent" to use. Others felt the simplicity of the menu made it time consuming to search through a list of blocks to find the desired block. The interface was also critiqued as being too large in size compared to the rest of the game's presentation: the Los Angeles Times stated "the building area is large, but users can see only a small part of it at a time". Reviews also mentioned high system requirements and slow performance, with Houston Chronicle writing that the game had "quirky" system requirements that did not work well or were slow on newer machines.

The control scheme was faulted, with reviewers considering it would take time for players to get used to them. The Children's Software Review stating that the game's design was "clumsy" and "adjusting the view and getting the Legos to line up just right is a frustrating process". Similarly, the Sydney Morning Herald viewed the game as requring patience to design and build objects and vehicles. However, The Straits Times considered that the game's "sophisticated" controls could help teach players computer skills, although would require high levels of parental assistance. Reviewers were also divided on the game's visual presentation: some found them to be good, and others critiqued them, also faulting the limited number of backgrounds or themes available.

=== Accolades ===
Lego Creator received a 1999 Codie Award for Best New Home Creativity Software Program by the Software and Information Industry Association. It also received the Computer Game Developers Spotlight Award at the 1999 Game Developers Conference, and was nominated at the 2nd Annual Interactive Achievement Awards for PC Children's Entertainment Title of the Year.

== Sequels ==
Lego Creator received three sequels in a series of the same name between 2000 and 2002: Lego Creator: Knights' Kingdom, originally announced as Lego Creator II, Lego Creator: Harry Potter and Creator: Harry Potter and the Chamber of Secrets.

Title	Year	Developer	Publisher
Lego Creator: Knights' Kingdom	2000	Superscape	Lego Software
Lego Creator: Harry Potter	2001	Superscape	Lego Software
Creator: Harry Potter and the Chamber of Secrets	2002	Qube Software	Electronic Arts; Lego Interactive
