= Superscape =

Video game developer

Superscape Group Limited
- Formerly: Votegain Public Limited Company (November–December 1993); Superscape V.R. Plc (1993–1994); Superscape VR Plc (1994–2000); Superscape Plc (2000–2002); Superscape Group Plc (2002–2008)
- Type: Corporation
- Industry: Video games
- Founded: 8 November 1993; 33 years ago
- Headquarters: Hook, Hampshire (UK), San Clemente, California (USA), Moscow (Russia)
- Products: Alien versus Predator; AvP2 2D; Evel Knievel Evel-ution; Fight Club; Independence Day; AMF Xtreme Bowling; Harlem Globetrotters
- Website: Superscape.com (archived)

Superscape Group Limited, trading as Superscape, was a British video game developer and publisher. The company developed games licensed from such companies as 20th Century Fox, Universal Pictures, Sony Pictures, Lego, and Global Wireless entertainment. Superscape evolved from Incentive Software, a publisher of home computer games in the 1980s and 1990s.

Superscape Group plc was listed on the London Stock Exchange (LSE: SPS), and had offices in Hook, Hampshire (UK), San Clemente, California (USA) and Moscow (Russia) until being purchased by Glu Mobile UK in early 2008.

== Games ==
- Alien vs. Predator
- Alien vs. Predator 2 2D: Requiem
- Alien vs. Predator 3D
- Capone Casino 3D
- Do3D
- Fight Club
- Fight Club 3D
- Kingdom Hearts VCAST
- Lego Creator
- Lego Creator: Harry Potter
- Lego Creator: Knights' Kingdom
- Scuba Solitaire 3D
- Top Spin 2 (mobile phone port)
