= Lego Castle =

Lego theme

- The logo that was used for the 2007–2009 wave
- Sub‑themes: Black Falcons; Crusaders; Forestmen; Black Knights; Wolfpack Renegades; Dragon Masters; Royal Knights; Dark Forest; Fright Knights; Ninja; Knights’ Kingdom; Castle (2007); Kingdoms; Castle (2013)
- Subject: Castle
- Availability: 1979–2013
- Total sets: 261
- Official website

The Lego Castle theme is a segment of the broader Lego product line that encapsulates a medieval world concept, prominently featuring knights and castles. Launched initially in Europe in 1979 and later introduced to North America in 1981, the theme enjoyed continuous support until 1999. It was one of the original three Legoland themes along with Town and Space, with each of the three themes representing the 'Past' (Castle), 'Present' (Town) and 'Future' (Space).

Following this period, the "Lego Castle" name was revived for two separate series; the first spanning from 2007 to 2009, and a second series in 2013. While distinct, the Lego Castle theme shares thematic elements with other medieval-inspired Lego series, such as Knights Kingdom, Knights Kingdom II, and Kingdoms. The early iterations of Lego Castle sets were distributed under the "Legoland" brand until 1991, after which Lego transitioned the branding to the "Lego System" in 1992, marking a shift in the product line's presentation.

== History ==
=== "Classic" Castle (1978–1983) ===
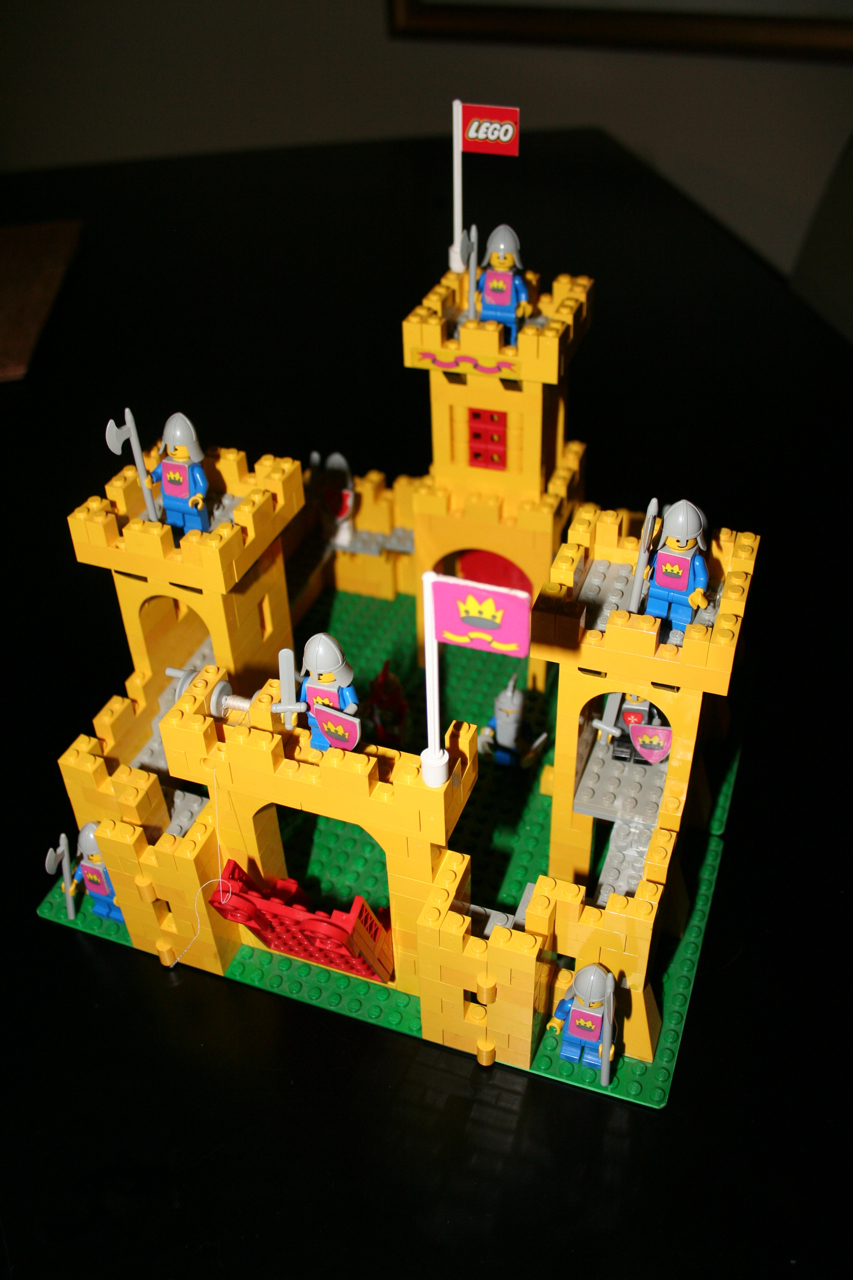
Assembled vintage 1978 Legoland 375 (the "Yellow Castle")

The Castle period from 1978 to 1983 predates themes or factions, and is often known as "Classic" Castle. 375 Castle (often called the Yellow Castle) is the most well-known set from this time. Often known by fans as "Original Castle", the knights featured unique movable visor pieces, with eye slits, and a crest that runs backwards from the frontward-facing part of the visor along the helmet. These knights also wore a coat of arms (either a tunic or breastplate) over their body. Knights between 1984 and 1989 had solid grill helmets while their "armor" was just a texture on their body. In 1990, knights again came with movable visors and armor breastplates. As there were no horse-specific pieces, horses were built entirely of bricks.

Following "Classic" Castle in 1984, Lego released the first Castle sets that had more realistic castles, knights, and colors (such as grey castles rather than yellow) in order to depict the Middle Ages more accurately as compared to the Classic Castle sets from the late 1970s and early 1980s. The 1984 castle sets featured many newly-introduced pieces and weapons. Examples are: one-piece horse, horse saddles, new knight helmets with fixed visors, feather plumes (there were three types in five colors: red, blue, yellow, white and black), waving flags and bows and arrows. Many of these new pieces were included in future castle sets.

=== Black Falcons (1984–1987) ===
The 1984 Castle sets predominantly featured the motif of a black and white bird against a black and white background, split down the middle. The minifigures that were associated with this symbol almost invariably had black pants, black helmets, and blue torsos with black sleeves, often with the bird emblem on their chests and shields (with a blue or gold border). Some fans in the United States have labeled this faction as "Black Falcons", and Australian fans have called them "Eagle Crest", though at the time each term appears only once in any official Lego literature – both in regional names for set 6074. A 1989 US catalogue includes an ambiguous reference to the "Guardians of the Gray Castles". However, the faction was never labeled as anything other than "Castle", nor was it ever officially recognized as a theme. Although the term Black Falcons wasn't explicitly and internationally used to market the faction in its original incarnation, Lego later picked up the term in its own marketing to refer to the earlier theme.

In 1984, the first Black Falcons castle was Knight's Castle (set 6073). It came with six minifigures; two archers, two spearmen, and two knights mounted on horses. Like the yellow castle, the set featured special hinge pieces that could open up the castle to take a look inside and get at the interior. The Black Falcons were also featured in other sets the same year such as Jousting Knights (set 6021) and Catapult (set 6030). In 1986, the Knight's Castle was replaced by a similar-sized Black Falcon's Fortress (set 6074, "Draco and the Black Knight" in the UK, "Eagle Crest Castle" in Australia), which had the same type of minifigures (including the two mounted knights). In 2002, at the request of fans, Lego re-released the Black Falcon's Fortress re-numbered as a Lego Legend that was almost identical to the 1986 set.

=== Crusaders / Lion Knights (1984–1992) ===
The sets that would eventually form the basis of the Crusaders were released the same year as the Black Falcons in 1984. The Crusaders shield had either a blue lion against a yellow background or a yellow lion against a blue background, both with a red border. The minifigures that were associated with these shields invariably had blue or red pants and red torsos with blue sleeves, and their helmets were usually gray. They had shield-like emblems on their torsos, one which was a yellow lion set against blue, while the other emblem had the crossed axes (two black and gold axes crossing each other against a black and gold background, split down the middle, with a red border). A few of these sets were later inducted into the Crusaders theme, so some fans retroactively consider all such sets to be Crusaders sets. As with the Black Falcons, Lego never officially named this faction for some time, although catalogues in Australia used the name Lion Knights while Canada used Lion Crest. The 1992 United States and Canadian catalogue officially established the faction as the Crusaders.

The 1990 Crusaders set King's Mountain Fortress (set 6081) was one of the first sets to feature the newly-invented knight helmet visor and armor pieces. Crossbows and glow-in-the-dark ghost were also new pieces introduced. The King's Mountain Fortress was also the first Lego castle to be mounted on a raised "ramp and pit", baseplate which had debuted the previous year in the pirates set Eldorado fortress and would feature in many subsequent Lego Castle, Pirates, and even Space sets. In 2001, Lego re-released the well-known Guarded Inn, re-numbered as a Lego Legend.

=== Forestmen (1987–1992) ===
The Forestmen theme was introduced in 1987 when Lego Castle released the first Forestmen set Camouflaged Outpost (set 6066). In 1988, Forestmen's Hideout (set 6054) was released, followed by Forestmen's River Fortress (set 6077) in 1989 and Forestmen's Crossing (set 6071) in 1990. In 1996, a similar theme called Dark Forest was released, which featured an amoral band of forest outlaws.

=== Black Knights (1988–1994) ===
Much like the Crusaders, the Black Knights were based on earlier, non-theme-affiliated sets, some of which were retrospectively included in the faction. Officially launched in 1992, the Black Knights are characterized by a red, yellow, and blue wyvern dragon symbol which is only shown on their shield or flag; unlike the other factions the Black Knights never wore the emblem on their chests. A number of new accessories were created for the theme, including a new oval shaped shield with a different dragon design usually carried by mounted knights, new dragon plumes available in four different colors (just like the feather plumes) which added side dragon wing plumes to the movable visors on knight helmets. These sets, along with Wolfpack, were the first castle sets to have minifigures with mustache and beard faces. The older dragon triangular shield was still used in the sets for infantry and guards. Older sets such as the Knights Stronghold and Black Monarch's Ghost were retroactively included as part of the Black Knights. The Black Knights series continued until the end of 1994 when they were superseded by the Royal Knights in 1995, save for one small set re-released in 1998.

=== Wolfpack Renegades (1992–1993) ===
The Wolfpack Renegades were a group of bandits in the Lego Castle world. Only three sets were made, making it the smallest Castle faction.

=== Dragon Masters (1993–1995) ===
The Dragon Masters collection was released in August 1993, making it the first time that Lego Castle had a fantasy faction with magic and mythical creatures. Led by a wizard (known as Majisto in the US, Merlin in the UK, and Cerlin in Germany) the Dragon Masters organization seemed to have the goal of capturing and taming fire-breathing dragons. The new dragon animal figure had points of articulation at the jaw, arms, wings, and the tail, with studs on their back to carry a minifigure as a rider, while a flame could be inserted near the tip of its mouth. Dragon Masters also introduced new knight helmets, halberds, faces, and the Wizard's glow-in-the-dark wand.

=== Royal Knights (1995–1996) ===
The Royal Knights were the first Lego theme to have skeletons, starting with the first ever skeleton set "Skeleton Surprise". Their leader was the Royal King. Their largest set was the Royal Knight's Castle (6090). This faction also introduced the fan favourite silver longsword, which is used by the Royal King.

=== Dark Forest (1996) ===
The Dark Forest faction is similar to Forestmen, almost as a reboot of the former team, and uses the same shields and iconography. With only three sets released it ties with Wolfpack for the smallest Castle faction ever, and the largest set was Dark Forest Fortress (6079). This theme was only released in North America.

=== Fright Knights (1997–1998) ===
The Fright Knights were a faction of soldiers that were not ruled by a king, but instead by Basil the Bat Lord. The Fright Knights Lego Sets delved deeper into the supernatural "Fantasy" aspect of Lego, featuring black dragons with fire-colored wings, creepy trap-filled red-and-black castles, crystal balls and Willa the Witch, a dark sorceress who was the real power behind Basil's throne. Their headquarters was the Night Lord's Castle (6097).

=== Ninja (1998–2000) ===
The Ninja theme launched in 1998. In contrast to Fright Knights, Ninja took its influence from a more realistic starting point and was set in mountainous Japan with medieval buildings. It had many elements of the ninja warriors from feudal Japan.

=== Knights' Kingdom (2000) ===
The Knights' Kingdom theme centred on a conflict involving the Lions, led by King Leo, and the Bulls, led by outlaw Cedric The Bull. This theme had many small sets with minifigures, and was the first Castle theme to feature two female minifigs, Queen Leonora and Princess Storm. The Lion shields were similar to those of the Royal Knights. The Lions castle was King Leo's Castle (6098), while the Bulls did not have a castle.

The video game Lego Creator: Knights' Kingdom was released in late 2000 by Lego Software and allowed the player to create their own kingdoms based on the Knights' Kingdom theme. Elements of theme also appeared in appearance in Lego Island 2: The Brickster's Revenge in 2001.

=== Knights' Kingdom (2004–2006) ===
A new theme called Knights' Kingdom (often referred to as Knight's Kingdom II to distinguish it from the 2000 theme) was announced in November 2003, in the United Kingdom version of Lego Magazine. In spring 2004, the large action figures were released in Europe; several months later, they were released in America. Both continents obtained the playsets in the summer. Knights' Kingdom chronicles the legends of the Kingdom of Morcia, a fantasy world, and the adventures that take place within it. The main characters are the knights of the opposing factions. It is a revamped version of an earlier Knights' Kingdom Lego theme, featuring larger, action-figure like characters as well as more colorfully attired minifigures in the traditional sets. While officially titled Knights' Kingdom on its packaging, it is popularly known as Knights' Kingdom II in order to differentiate it from the original theme which only included Lego minifigures and featured different knight, king, and villain characters. It was also made into a trading card game and book series. Vladek's Dark Fortress (set 8877) was the largest set of this theme. King's Castle (set 10176) is part of this product line, but is not in the official storyline.

=== Castle II (2007–2009) ===
Released in May, 2007, the new Lego Castle line features a human faction led by a King fighting against an opposing undead skeleton faction ruled by an evil Necromancer. This was also the first series to have a royal family including a Queen and a Princess. It also included other minifigures such as a Champion (Gold Knight), a Court Wizard, and even a Jester. The human faction bears the emblem of a crown, leading to being nicknamed by buyers and Lego fans as the "Crownies". Their main color scheme is dark blue, light blue and gold. The undead faction has the emblem of a skull, and the army consists almost entirely of undead skeletons, mostly the normal white kind but also featuring a new black variant. Their color scheme consists of dark red and black. In 2008, Lego Castle introduced sets with orcs, trolls, and dwarves to add to the medieval fantasy theme. Excluding the Chess Set, the largest set of this theme is Medieval Market Village (10193). The last sets of this incarnation of Castle were released in 2009 and were replaced by a new environment, Kingdoms, in 2010.

=== Kingdoms (2010–2012) ===
Kingdoms is the name of the Lego Medieval theme that was released June 2010 and replaced the fantasy-based Castle theme that had been in place since 2007. Kingdoms departs from the concept of a fantasy world inhabited by undead, orcs and dwarves; and returns to a more realistic world modeled after the European Middle Ages. In Kingdoms, there are two human factions pitted against each other. One side has the role of the attackers, featuring more vehicles and siege engines (The Green Kingdom/Dragon Knights). The other side has the role of the defenders with an emphasis on buildings (The Red Kingdom/Lion Knights). This theme, like the fantasy-era Castle theme of 2007, includes peasants and civilians, instead of concentrating solely on military factions. The Kingdoms theme was discontinued in 2012, replaced by The Lord of the Rings franchise sets.

Kingdoms is the first theme to include back-printing on the torsos of the minifigures. This theme featured new knight helms, new horse armor (a sleek-silhouette "unicorn" horse battle helmet), goats, and a new portcullis piece. Two unique horse prints are found only in Kingdoms sets: a pair of white horses with printed harnesses in King's Carriage Ambush (set 7188), and a dappled grey cart horse in Mill Village Raid (set 7189). This theme also marked a return to the full-body rampant lion motif, rather than the lion head used in the Royal Knights, Knight's Kingdom I, and Knight's Kingdom II.

=== Castle III (2013–2014) ===
Lego released a new Castle theme in autumn 2013 replacing the previously cancelled Kingdoms theme. It ended up being a very short-lived theme with only five sets released in late 2013 and two battlepacks released in early 2014. The two factions were "King's Knights", which wore blue with a crown insignia on their torsos and lion insignia on their shields and armor; and "Dragon Knights", in red and black. This theme was a fantasy-based theme with a wizard and a large dragon.

=== Standalone Castle sets (2014–present) ===
Although Lego has not released a new line of medieval-themed sets since the end of Castle III in 2013, Lego has released, under other lines, several standalone sets which are stylistically consistent with many of the previous Castle themes. On February 1, 2021 Lego released the Medieval Blacksmith Shop as a Lego Ideas set. On June 1st, 2021 Lego released the Creator 3-1 Medieval Castle in the Creator theme. In July 2022 the Lego Lions Knight Castle was released inspired by the original Castle set in 1984. On March 1, 2024 Lego released the Lego Icons Medieval Town Square set as a remake of the 2009 Medieval Market Village. This set also brought back a retired goat piece.

== Theme park attractions ==
In 1999, a Lego Castle themed land was introduced to Legoland California, featuring Castle Hill, Wild Woods Golf and Enchanted Walk.

In 2002, a Lego Castle themed land was introduced to Legoland Deutschland Resort, featuring Caterpillar Ride, Royal Joust, Fire Dragon, Dragon Hunt and Gold Panning.

In November 2021, a Lego Castle themed land was announced for the upcoming launch of Legoland Shanghai Resort in 2024.

== Awards and nominations ==
In 2005, Lego Knights’ Kingdom was awarded "Toy of the Year" and also "Boy Toy of the Year" by the Toy Association.

== See also ==
- Nexo Knights
- Lego The Lord of the Rings
- Lego Fusion
- Lego Brawls
