= Lego Creator: Knights' Kingdom =

2000 video game

- Developer: Superscape
- Publisher: Lego Software
- Platform: Windows
- Release: NA: 2 October 2000
- Genre: Construction and management simulation
- Mode: Single-player

Lego Creator: Knights' Kingdom is a 2000 construction simulation video game for Microsoft Windows. It allows players to use virtual Lego pieces, first to build a medieval kingdom, and then to use the kingdom in a battle against the character Cedric the Bull. It is a stand-alone sequel to the 1998 game Lego Creator, and is based on the first incarnation of Lego's Knights' Kingdom theme.

== Gameplay ==
Before the player can start creating a world, four challenges have to be completed. Each one consists of using different models and moving around the Lego world. There are also two challenges to do before new models can be built. These challenges involve working with different Lego bricks, and putting them together into a model.

The game includes all the regular Lego bricks, and different bricks which are medieval themed. Also, there is a "Destructa Brick" used in Play mode to destroy structures. The game uses features such as rotating bricks, painting bricks, and lifting bricks, to make models easier to construct.

A feature known as "The Workshop" allows the player to create their own virtual Lego models, using a library of bricks available. Building instructions are created to help players re-create the model using bricks in their own Lego collection.
