= Lego DOTS =

Lego theme

- Subject: Arts and Crafts
- Availability: 2020–2023
- Total sets: 80
- Official website

Lego DOTS is a discontinued Lego theme based on multiple shapes and colourful tiles, with 1×1 elements intended to decorate the products. These include wearable wristbands and decorative room objects that can be individually customised. The theme includes over 30 mood tiles including facial expressions, a music note, a cosmic planet, star night and paw print. The theme was first introduced in March 2020. In January 2023, The Lego Group announced Lego DOTS was discontinued in December 2023.

== Overview ==
Lego DOTS is an arts and crafts theme that encourages designing with 1×1 tiles on either a constructed object, an 8×8 plate or a wristband. The product line focuses on arts and crafts. Each set features DOTS bracelets and room décor.

In addition, HOUSE OF DOTS, an interactive house with an eight-foot slide, was launched in London. London's Coal Yard Drops hosted the launch of Lego DOTS at the HOUSE OF DOTS. The unique art installation is a collaboration between artist Camille Walala and The Lego Group, designed to encapsulate everything about the new product line. During the launch of Lego DOTS, The Lego Group invited artist Camille Walala to design the HOUSE OF DOTS.

In 2020, Lego Masters USA judge and Lego Design Lead Amy Corbett who working on her current project with her design team is Lego DOTS, where they work to customize daily items like jewelry and picture frames.

In 2022, a Lego DOTS event was launched in London Westfield shopping centre from 30 May 2022 until 5 June 2022.

== Development ==
During the development process of the Lego DOTS theme, Lego design lead and Lego Masters judge Amy Corbett explained how 1×1 tiles became the foundation of Lego DOTS and commented, "We tried out lots of different things and thinking about what creativity means for the kids. How do kids who think they can't achieve success with Lego achieve success quite quickly, so we can prove to them that Lego is something that works for them? The 1×1 tile really was a great way to have this great intuitive creative experience where you don't need a lot of guidance and instruction and you very quickly can succeed – but you can also grow and master it, and get better at it."

Lego designers Laura Perron and Chiara Biscontin discussed their work on LEGO DOTS and explained how the theme was developed. Laura Perron explained, "It's all about experimentation and failing and gaining success, trying things that work and trying things that doesn't work." Chiara Biscontin explained, "As a designer our aim is to create something where kids would feel they can create it and make it their own and not doubt themselves," and continued, "DOTS is a new way to express yourself in a really simple and intuitive way. The way that we designed it is that you have the plates, the brick and then the tile. DOTS is using the tile as the core of what you do to decorate that plates that than go on to a structure that is useful."

Lego Design and Lego Masters judge lead Amy Corbett discussed the foray into the arts and crafts space for Lego DOTS and explained, "We tried many different directions, but we soon found that the 2D building platform and designing through pattern making were the perfect foundation…and after a lot of looping, LEGO DOTS was born." and continued, "Finally, we wanted to showcase the patterns and creativity in a meaningful way; celebrating the designs through items like a pencil box, photo holder or bracelet. With LEGO DOTS, you can play with shapes, colours and decorations to make endless combinations. And something seemingly simple, that anyone can try, can turn into something amazing!"

Lego designers demonstrated the LEGO DOTS home décor items and shared a little of the thought process behind the set designs. Lego designer Laura Perron explained, "When designing the pineapple we wanted to make it as easy to build as possible," and continued, "So we did that in a few ways. We have these coloured layers that make it really easy to see which layer you're on then we have these large layers that make building really fast and easy.”

== Launch ==
Lego DOTS was launched at a launch event in Central London in 2020. Later, it was launched in the USA at New York Toy Fair. As part of the marketing campaign, The Lego Group released Lego DOTS bracelets and accessories.

== Construction sets ==
According to BrickLink, The Lego Group has released a total of 80 Lego sets and promotional polybags as part of the Lego DOTS theme.

=== DOTS bracelets ===
Five sets of DOTS Bracelets were released on 1 March 2020. The five sets were Rainbow (set number: 41900), Funky Animals (set number: 41901), Sparkly Unicorn (set number: 41902), Cosmic Wonder (set number: 41903) and Love Birds (set number: 41912). Each set included a bracelet and 32 tiles. Later, four sets of DOTS bracelets were released on 1 June 2020. The four sets were Go Team! Bracelet (set number: 41911), Bracelet Mega Pack (set number: 41913), Magic Forest Bracelet (set number: 41917) and Power Bracelet (set number: 41919).

In 2021, five sets of DOTS Bracelets were released on 1 January 2021. The five sets were Mermaid Vibes Bracelets (set number: 41909), Ice Cream Besties Bracelets (set number: 41910), Adventure Bracelets (set number: 41918), Monster Bracelet (set number: 41923) and Starlight Bracelets (set number: 41934). Two sets of DOTS Bracelets were released on 1 March 2021. The two sets were Cool Cactus Bracelet (set number: 41922) and Music Bracelet (set number: 41933). In October 2021, The Lego Group announced the Mermaid Vibes Bracelets (set number: 41909), Ice Cream Besties Bracelets (set number: 41910), Bracelet Mega Pack (set number: 41913), Adventure Bracelets (set number: 41918), Cool Cactus Bracelet (set number: 41922), Monster Bracelet (set number: 41923), Music Bracelet (set number: 41933) and Starlight Bracelets (set number: 41934) were to be retired on 31 December 2021.

In December 2021, The Lego Group revealed two new sets. Into the Deep Bracelet with Charms (set number: 41942) and Gamer Bracelet with Charms (set number: 41943) were to be released on 1 January 2022. In September 2022, Into the Deep Bracelet with Charms (set number: 41942) and Gamer Bracelet with Charms (set number: 41943) were tobe retired at the end of 2022.

In May 2022, Rainbow Bracelet with Charms (set number: 41953) was released on 1 June 2022. The set consists of 37 pieces and a bracelet. In September 2022, Rainbow Bracelet with Charms (set number: 41953) will be retired at the end of 2022.

In December 2022, My Pets Bracelet (set number: 41801), Unicorns Forever Bracelet (set number: 41802) and Bracelet Designer Mega Pack (set number: 41807) were to be released on 1 January 2023.

=== Accessories ===
In 2020, three sets of accessories were released on 1 March 2020. The three sets were Picture Holder (set number: 41904), Rainbow Jewelry Stand (set number: 41905) and Pineapple Pencil Holder (set number: 41906). In addition, Mini Frame (set number: 30556) polybag set was released as a promotion. Later, three sets were released on 1 June 2020. The three sets were Desk Organiser (set number: 41907), Creative Picture Frames (set number: 41914) and Jewelry Box (set number: 41915).

In 2021, three sets of accessories were released on 1 January 2021. The three sets were Secret Holder (set number: 41924), Secret Boxes (set number: 41925) and Creative Party Kit (set number: 41926). In addition, Photo Holder Cube (set number: 30557) polybag set was released as a promotion. Three new sets of room décor were released on 1 June 2021. The three sets were Pencil Holder (set number: 41936), and Multi Pack – Summer Vibes (set number: 41937). In October 2021, The Lego Group announced the Pineapple Pencil Holder (set number: 41906), Desk Organizer (set number: 41907), Creative Picture Frames (set number: 41914), Jewelry Box (set number: 41915), Secret Holder (set number: 41924) and Secret Boxes (set number: 41925) were to be retired on 31 December 2021. In September 2022, Pencil Holder (set number: 41936) will be retired at the end of 2022.

In December 2021, The Lego Group revealed the Cute Banana Pen Holder (set number: 41948) would be released on 1 January 2022. The set consists of 438 pieces and a pen holder. In addition, a promotional polybag set namely Pineapple Photo Holder and Mini Board (set number: 30560) will be released as well.

In 2022, The Lego Group revealed two new sets named Message Board (set number: 41951) and Big Message Board (set number: 41952) would be released on 1 March 2022. In September 2022, Big Message Board (set number: 41952) was retired at the end of 2022.

In May 2022, Ice Cream Picture Frames & Bracelet (set number: 41956) was released on 1 June 2022. The sets consists of 474 tiles. The set included three ice-cream-themed picture frames and a bracelet. In September 2022, Ice Cream Picture Frames & Bracelet (set number: 41956) was retired at the end of 2022. In addition, Cute Panda Tray (set number: 41959) and Big Box (set number: 41960) were released on 1 June 2022. Cute Panda Tray (set number: 41959) consists of 517 tiles and Big Box (set number: 41960) consists of 479 tiles.

In December 2022, Creative Animal Drawer (set number: 41805) was released on 1 January 2023. The set consists of 643 tiles and a rectangular drawer.

=== Extra DOTS ===
Extra DOTS Series 1 (set number: 41908) was released on 1 March 2020. The set consists of 109 tiles and offers builders to add-on to the DOTS Bracelet and room décor sets. In October 2021, The Lego Group announced the Extra DOTS Series 1 (set number: 41908) was retired at the end of 2021.

Extra DOTS Series 2 (set number: 41916) was released on 1 June 2020. The set consists of 109 tiles and offers builders to add-on to the DOTS Bracelet and room décor sets. In October 2021, The Lego Group announced the Extra DOTS Series 2 (set number: 41916) was retired at the end of 2021.

Extra DOTS Series 3 (set number: 41921) was released on 1 January 2021. The set consists of 107 tiles and offers builders to add-on to the DOTS Bracelet and room décor sets. In October 2021, The Lego Group announced the Extra DOTS Series 3 (set number: 41921) was retired at the end of 2021.

Extra DOTS Series 4 (set number: 41931) was released on 1 March 2021. The set consists of 105 tiles and offers builders to add-on to the DOTS Bracelet and room décor sets. In October 2021, The Lego Group announced the Extra DOTS Series 4 (set number: 41931) was retired at the end of 2021.

Extra DOTS Series 5 (set number: 41932) was released on 1 June 2021. The set consists of 120 tiles and offers builders to add-on to the DOTS Bracelet and room décor sets. In October 2021, The Lego Group announced the Extra DOTS Series 5 (set number: 41932) was retired at the end of 2021.

Extra DOTS Series 6 (set number: 41946) was released on 1 January 2022. The set consists of 118 tiles and offers builders to add-on to the DOTS Bracelet and room décor sets. In September 2022, Extra DOTS Series 6 (set number: 41946) will be retired at the end of 2022.

Extra DOTS Series 7 - Sport (set number: 41958) was released on 1 June 2022. The set consists of 115 tiles and offers builders to add-on to the DOTS Bracelet and room décor sets. In September 2022, Extra DOTS Series 7 - Sport (set number: 41958) was retired at the end of 2022.

Extra DOTS Series 8 – Glitter and Shine (set number: 41803) was released on 1 January 2023. The set consists of 115 tiles and offers builders to add-on to the DOTS Bracelet and room décor sets.

=== DOTS Bag Tags ===
In 2021, four sets were released on 1 March 2021. The four sets were Bag Tag Dog (set number: 41927), Bag Tag Narwhal (set number: 41928), Bag Tag Leopard (set number: 41929) and Bag Tag Panda (set number: 41930). Each set is based on specific animals and consists of 85 tiles. In August 2021, two sets were released on 1 August 2021. The two sets were Bag Tag Dragon (set number: 41939) and Bag Tag Unicorn (set number: 41940). In October 2021, The Lego Group announced six sets of Bag Tags were to be retired on 31 December 2021.

In January 2023, Animal Tray and Bag Tag (set number: 30637) was released as promotional.

=== Bracelet & Bag Tag ===
In December 2021, The Lego Group revealed two new sets named Candy Kitty Bracelet and Bag Tag (set number: 41944) and Neon Tiger Bracelet and Bag Tag (set number: 41945) would be released on 1 January 2022. Bag Tags Mega Pack – Messaging (set number: 41949) was released on 1 March 2022. The set consists of 228 tiles. In September 2022, Candy Kitty Bracelet and Bag Tag (set number: 41944) and Neon Tiger Bracelet and Bag Tag (set number: 41945) were to be retired at the end of 2022. Also Bag Tags Mega Pack – Messaging (set number: 41949) was retired at the end of 2022.

=== Lots of DOTS ===
In 2021, Lots of DOTS (set number: 41935) was released on 1 June 2021. The set consists of 1040 tiles and offers builders to add-on to the DOTS Bracelet and room décor sets. In September 2022, Lots of DOTS (set number: 41935) was retired at the end of 2022.

In 2022, Lots of DOTS – Lettering (set number: 41950) was released on 1 March 2022. The set consists of 722 tiles and offers builders to add-on to the DOTS message boards and room décor sets.

=== Patches ===
In May 2022, Adhesive Patch (set number: 41954) and Stitch-on Patch (set number: 41955) was released on 1 June 2022. Both sets consists of 95 tiles. Both sets include 8×8 plates that can attached to any hard surface. In September 2022, Adhesive Patch (set number: 41954) and Stitch-on Patch (set number: 41955) were retired at the end of 2022.

In May 2022, Adhesive Patches Mega Pack (set number: 41957) was released on 1 June 2022. The sets consists of 486 tiles. The set included 8×8 plate can attached to any hard surface.

=== Disney ===
In July 2022, Mickey & Friends Bracelets Mega Pack (set number: 41947) will be released on 1 August 2022 and based on the Disney cartoon characters. The set consists of 349 tiles and five bracelets. Each of the printed tiles included the faces of Mickey Mouse, Minnie Mouse, Goofy, Donald Duck, Daisy Duck and Pluto characters.

In July 2022, Mickey Mouse & Minnie Mouse Stitch-on Patch (set number: 41963) and Mickey Mouse & Minnie Mouse Back-to-School Project Box (set number: 41964) were released on 1 August 2022. The 2 sets based on the Disney cartoon characters.

=== Harry Potter ===
In January 2023, three sets were released on 1 March 2023 and were based on the films of the Harry Potter series. A total of three sets including Hogwarts Accessories Pack (set number: 41808), Hedwig Pencil Holder (set number: 41809) and Hogwarts Desktop Kit (set number: 41811). Hogwarts Accessories Pack (set number: 41808) consists of 234 tiles included a bracelet, bag tag and stitch-on patch. Hedwig Pencil Holder (set number: 41809) consists of 518 tiles included an owl-themed accessories and an envelope-shaped note holder. Hedwig Desktop Kit (set number: 41811) consists of 856 tiles included Golden Snitch note holder, scarf-shaped tray, lockable secret box and a picture frame.

=== Miscellaneous ===
In 2021, Creative Designer Box (set number: 41938) was released on 1 June 2021. The set consists of 849 tiles. The set included a desk organizer, 2-level standing drawers and a hanging message board. In September 2022, Creative Designer Box (set number: 41938) was retired at the end of 2022.

In addition, Designer Toolkit – Patterns (set number: 41961) and Unicorn Creative Family Pack (set number: 41962) were released on 1 June 2022.

In December 2022, Ultimate Party Kit (set number: 41806) was released on 1 January 2023. The sets consists of 1,154 tiles. The set included six cupcakes and six bracelets.

=== Promotional ===
In January 2022, Pineapple Photo Holder and Mini Board (set number: 30560) was released as a promotion. The set consists of 116 tiles and a photo holder.

In July 2022, Pencil Holder (set number: 40561) was released as a promotion from 8 August 2022 until 28 August 2022. The set consists of 476 tiles and a holder.

== Web shorts ==
Two web shorts were released on YouTube to promote the theme.

- Jay-Ann Lopez designs the ultimate gaming headset with LEGO DOTS is an official web short released on YouTube on 25 October 2022. It features Jay-Ann Lopez create her own gaming headset with Lego DOTS Designer Toolkit – Patterns (set number: 41961).
- Chloe Rose expresses her creativity with LEGO DOTS is an official web short released on YouTube on 24 November 2022. It features Chloe Rose create her own Lego DOTS Message Boards.

== App ==
A crossover event with mobile strategic life simulation game The Sims FreePlay developed by Electronic Arts’ Firemonkeys Studios for iOS, Android and Amazon Appstore was active from 14 June 2022 until 25 July 2022.

== Other merchandise ==
The DOTS brand has also produced clothing and accessories for children and young adults, including collaborations with Adidas in 2021.

== Reception ==
In July 2020, Lego DOTS was shortlisted for the Play Creators Awards 2020. In October 2020, Rainbow Jewellery Stand (set number: 41905) was listed on the DreamToys 2020 Christmas list of predicted bestsellers. Lego DOTS was listed on the Geoffrey's Hot Toy List for Christmas 2020 by Toys "R" Us.

== Awards and nominations ==
In 2020, Rainbow Jewellery Stand (set number: 41905) was awarded "DreamToys" in the Crafty Kids category by the Toy Retailers Association.

In 2021, Lego DOTS won The NPD Group's Global and European Toy Industry Performance Awards.

== See also ==
- Lego Art
- Lego BrickHeadz
- Lego Brick Sketches
- Lego Disney
- Lego Harry Potter
