= Lego Harry Potter =

Lego theme based on the Harry Potter film series

- Sub‑themes: Fantastic Beasts; Philosopher's Stone; Chamber of Secrets; Prisoner of Azkaban; Goblet of Fire; Order of the Phoenix; Half-Blood Prince; Deathly Hallows
- Subject: Harry Potter
- Licensed from: Warner Bros. Animation
- Availability: 2001–2007, 2010–2011, 2016, 2018–present
- Total sets: 138

Lego Harry Potter (stylized as LEGO Harry Potter) is a Lego theme based on the film series of the same name and the eponymous novels by British author J. K. Rowling. It is licensed from Warner Bros. Entertainment Lego models of important scenes, vehicles and characters were made for the first six films and all of the published books. The first sets appeared in 2001, to coincide with the release of the first film, Harry Potter and the Philosopher's Stone. Subsequent sets were released alongside the later films, until Harry Potter and the Order of the Phoenix. The line then went dormant for three years, with sets being released in 2010 and 2011. In 2018, it was announced that more sets based on the Harry Potter franchise (formerly known as Wizarding World) would be released, including new sets based on Fantastic Beasts and Where to Find Them and its sequel, Fantastic Beasts: The Crimes of Grindelwald.

== Overview ==
The main focus of the line is Harry Potter's first year at Hogwarts School of Witchcraft and Wizardry as he discovers that he is a famous wizard and begins his education. Later on, sets based on other installments and spin-offs would be produced as well.

In October 2021, Matthew Lewis, who portrayed Neville Longbottom in the Harry Potter films, recreated his favorite scenes to celebrate 20 Years of Movie Magic with Lego Harry Potter.

In July 2022, Lego Con hosts Joel McHale and Vick Hope built their own Lego Hogwarts castle using building tips from Lego Harry Potter designer, Marcos Bessa. Evanna Lynch, who portrayed Luna Lovegood in the Harry Potter films, goes on a magical adventure through Warner Bros. Studio Tour London – The Making of Harry Potter and finds out how they inspired the current Lego Harry Potter sets.

== Development ==
Lego Harry Potter was inspired by the Harry Potter film series. The construction toy range was based on the films and developed in collaboration with Warner Bros. Consumer Products. The construction sets were designed to recreate the story and characters of the films in Lego form.

== Launch ==
The first Lego Harry Potter sets were launched in September 2001. In January 2004, Lego owner and CEO Kjeld Kirk Kristiansen announced a change in direction for the company, which at the time was facing a DKK 1.4 billion loss, and that the company would focus on core products and not "big, movie-related IPs such as Harry Potter". A week later, the company clarified that this did not mean any immediate "radical changes", and that the Harry Potter theme would continue. However, the theme was discontinued after 2007 for a time. The original Lego Harry Potter minifigure skin tone was yellow until April 2004 when they switched to more realistic natural skin tones.

In June 2009, it was officially announced by The Lego Group that a video game, Lego Harry Potter: Years 1–4 was in production. It was released in June 2010. Lego Harry Potter: Years 5–7 was released in November 2011.

Warner Bros. and Lego announced on February 12, 2010, that six sets including Hogwarts Castle (set number: 4842), Hagrid's Hut (set number: 4738), The Burrow (set number: 4840), Hogwarts Express (set number: 4841), Dobby's Release (set number: 4736) and Quidditch Match (set number: 4737) would be released in October 2010. These sets have newly decorated minifigures and animals, including Luna Lovegood, Bellatrix Lestrange, and new owls. Also announced was a Lego Harry Potter board game that was released in August. In 2013, The Lego Group discontinued Lego Harry Potter sets. However, a Lego Dimensions add-on pack featuring Harry Potter and Voldemort was scheduled to be released on 27 September 2016.

In 2018, it was announced that more sets based on the Harry Potter Universe would be released, starting with a set based on the Great Hall at Hogwarts.

On 28 April 2020, it was announced that more sets based on the Harry Potter Universe would be released in August 2020.

On 31 August 2020, The Lego Group announced a new set, Diagon Alley (set number: 75978), which was released the following month.

During the post-2018 reboot wave, Lego has also released two series of Lego Harry Potter Collectible Minifigures under the Lego Minifigures theme.

In 2021, the Harry Potter Hogwarts Crests set (set number: 31201) was announced. It was released on 1 January 2021 as a sub-brand of the Lego Art theme. Lego has also released more sets in the summer of 2021 to commemorate the 20th anniversary of Lego Harry Potter. More sets were released in 2022.

== Construction sets ==
=== Harry Potter and the Philosopher's Stone (2001–2002) ===
The first film saw the largest number of sets, with fourteen being made in total starting 1 September 2001. Eleven were produced in 2001, with the remaining three released the following year.

Name	Number	Minifigures
Sorting Hat	4701	Harry Potter
The Final Challenge	4702	Harry Potter and Professor Quirrell/Lord Voldemort
The Chamber of Winged Keys	4704	Harry Potter, Ron Weasley and a White Queen Chess Piece
Snape's Classroom	4705	Professor Snape, Ron Weasley and Peeves
Forbidden Corridor	4706	Harry Potter, Ron Weasley, Hermione Granger and Fluffy the Three-headed dog
Hagrid's Hut	4707	Hagrid, Professor Dumbledore and Norbert the Dragon
Hogwarts Express	4708	Harry Potter, Ron Weasley and Hermione Granger
Hogwarts Castle	4709	Harry Potter, Ron Weasley, Hermione Granger, Professor Snape, Hagrid, Professor Dumbledore, Draco Malfoy, Peeves, and a Gryffindor Knight
Flying Lesson	4711	Harry Potter and Draco Malfoy
Troll on the Loose	4712	Harry Potter and the Mountain Troll
Gringotts Bank	4714	Harry Potter, Griphook, a Goblin and Rubeus Hagrid
Hogwarts Classrooms	4721	Harry Potter
Gryffindor House	4722	Ron Weasley
Diagon Alley Shops	4723	Hermione Granger

=== Harry Potter and the Chamber of Secrets (2002–2003) ===
Ten sets were produced based on the second film in the series, two of which were released the year after the second film. These sets were designed to be combined with the sets from the first film, with launch starting on 1 January 2002.

Name	Number	Minifigures
Quality Quidditch Supplies	4719	Draco Malfoy
Knockturn Alley	4720	Harry Potter and Lucius Malfoy
Quidditch Practice	4726	Harry Potter, Draco Malfoy and Madam Hooch
Aragog in the Dark Forest	4727	Harry Potter, Ron Weasley and Aragog the Spider
Escape from Privet Drive	4728	Ron Weasley, Harry Potter and Vernon Dursley
Dumbledore's Office	4729	Harry Potter, Professor Dumbledore and Professor McGonagall
The Chamber of Secrets	4730	Harry Potter, Tom Riddle, Ginny Weasley, Professor Lockhart, Ron Weasley, Fawkes the Phoenix and the Basilisk
Dobby's Release	4731	Lucius Malfoy and Dobby
The Dueling Club	4733	Harry Potter, Draco Malfoy, Professor Snape and Professor Lockhart
Slytherin	4735	Draco Malfoy, Vincent Crabbe/Ron Weasley and Gregory Goyle/Harry Potter

=== Harry Potter and the Prisoner of Azkaban (2004) ===
The third film saw eleven sets released, starting 1 April 2004, including the first Lego Harry Potter mini set. In addition, the minifigures became flesh-toned, following Lego's universal change for licensed characters.

Name	Number	Minifigures
Draco's Encounter with Buckbeak	4750	Draco Malfoy and Buckbeak the Hippogriff
Harry and the Marauder's Map	4751	Harry Potter, Professor Snape and the Humpbacked Witch Statue
Professor Lupin's Classroom	4752	Professor Lupin, Professor Snape (Boggart) and Neville Longbottom
Sirius Black's Escape	4753	Harry Potter, a Dementor, Sirius Black and Buckbeak the Hippogriff
Hagrid's Hut	4754	Hermione Granger and Hagrid
Knight Bus	4755	Harry Potter, Knight Bus Driver/Stan Shunpike and Grim Dog
Shrieking Shack	4756	Peter Pettigrew, Harry Potter, Sirius Black and Professor Lupin/Werewolf
Hogwarts Castle	4757	Harry Potter, Hermione Granger, Ron Weasley, Professor Dumbledore, Professor Trelawney, Draco Malfoy and two Dementors
Hogwarts Express	4758	Harry Potter, Ron Weasley, Professor Lupin and a Dementor
Motorized Hogwarts Express	10132	Harry Potter, Ron Weasley, Professor Lupin and a Dementor

==== Mini-sets (Small Polybags) ====
Name	Number
Mini Knight Bus	4695
Mini Hogwarts Express	40028

=== Harry Potter and the Goblet of Fire (2005) ===
Only four sets based on the fourth film were released, starting 1 October 2005. The Harry Potter minifigure headpiece was redesigned in this series.

Name	Number	Minifigures
Rescue from the Merpeople	4762	Harry Potter, Ron Weasley, Hermione Granger, Viktor Krum (Shark Head) and a Merperson
Graveyard Duel	4766	Harry Potter, Voldemort, Lucius Malfoy (Masked), Peter Pettigrew and four Skeletons
Harry and the Hungarian Horntail	4767	Harry Potter, Professor Dumbledore, Mad-Eye Moody and the Hungarian Horntail dragon
The Durmstrang Ship	4768	Headmaster Karkaroff and Viktor Krum

=== Harry Potter and the Order of the Phoenix (2007) ===
Only one set was produced based on the fifth film foreshadowing the theme's assumed retirement. This was the last Harry Potter themed set until 2010, released 1 June 2007.

Name	Number	Minifigures
Hogwarts Castle	5378	Harry Potter, Ron Weasley, Hermione Granger, Professor Dumbledore, Hagrid, Draco Malfoy, Professor Snape, Professor Umbridge, two Thestrals and a Death Eater

=== Revival Series (2010) ===
Lego revived the Harry Potter theme after a three-year gap from previous set released in 2007. These new sets were released October 1, 2010 within the UK. All sets are remakes of previous ones with the exception of one new set, The Burrow, which is based on a scene from Harry Potter and the Half-Blood Prince.

Name	Number	Based on	Minifigures
Freeing Dobby	4736	Harry Potter and the Chamber of Secrets	Harry Potter, Dobby and Lucius Malfoy
Quidditch Match	4737	Harry Potter and the Chamber of Secrets	Harry Potter, Madam Hooch, Draco Malfoy, Oliver Wood and Marcus Flint
Hagrid's Hut	4738	Various Movies, with particular elements from Harry Potter and the Philosopher's Stone and Harry Potter and the Chamber of Secrets	Harry Potter, Hagrid, Ron Weasley, Hermione Granger, Aragog and Norbert the Baby Dragon
The Burrow	4840	Harry Potter and the Half-Blood Prince	Arthur Weasley, Molly Weasley, Ginny Weasley, Harry Potter, Fenrir Greyback, Bellatrix Lestrange and Errol
Hogwarts Express	4841	Various Movies, with particular elements from Harry Potter and the Chamber of Secrets and Harry Potter and the Half-Blood Prince	Harry Potter, Ron Weasley, Draco Malfoy, Ginny Weasley and Luna Lovegood
Hogwarts Castle	4842	Various Movies, with particular elements from Harry Potter and the Half-Blood Prince and Harry Potter and the Deathly Hallows-part 2	Harry Potter, Hermione Granger, Professor McGonagall, Argus Filch, Filius Flitwick, Professor Dumbledore, Professor Snape, two Dementors, Mrs Norris and Lord Voldemort

=== 2011 ===
Lego released four main sets in 2011. Diagon Alley was released in January, while the other three sets were released on June 1, 2011, coinciding with the release of Harry Potter and the Deathly Hallows – Part 2. However, the Trolley, The Lab and the Mini Hogwarts Express were all promotional sets that were released in different countries at different times, which were either being given away with newspaper offers, the purchase of Diagon Alley from the Lego Shop and also with the pre-order of the game, Lego Harry Potter: Years 5–7.

Name	Number	Based on	Minifigures
Diagon Alley	10217	Various Movies	Harry Potter, Hermione Granger, Ron Weasley, Hagrid, Fred and George Weasley, Lucius Malfoy, Fenrir Greyback, Garrick Ollivander, two Gringotts goblins and a skeleton
Forbidden Forest	4865	Harry Potter and the Deathly Hallows – Part 2	Harry Potter, Rubeus Hagrid, Lord Voldemort and Narcissa Malfoy
Knight Bus	4866	Harry Potter and the Prisoner of Azkaban	Harry Potter, Stan Shunpike, Ernie Prang and the Shrunken Head
Battle for Hogwarts	4867	Harry Potter and the Deathly Hallows – Part 2	Harry Potter, Neville Longbottom, Remus Lupin, Professor Sprout, Gregory Goyle, Lucius Malfoy, and a Dementor
Trolley (Small Polybag)	30110	Various Movies	Harry Potter and Hedwig
The Lab (Small Polybag)	30111	Various Movies	Harry Potter

=== 2016 ===
Lego has produced a Harry Potter-themed Lego Dimensions "team pack", released in the United States on 27 September 2016. This add-on pack includes Harry Potter and Voldemort minifigures that are largely similar to the 2010/2011 versions. Key differences include a different hairpiece for Harry and a brown wand for Voldemort instead of a white wand. The add-on pack also includes smaller versions of the Weasleys' flying Ford Anglia and the Hogwarts Express engine. This "team pack" number is 71247.

An additional "fun pack" featuring Hermione Granger and Buckbeak (71348) was released on May 9, 2017. Add-on packs based on Fantastic Beasts and Where to Find Them were released alongside the film on 18 November 2016; these include a "story pack" containing Newt Scamander, Teddy the Niffler and a MACUSA model (71253), and a "fun pack" containing Tina Goldstein and a Swooping Evil (71257).

=== 2018 (Focused on the Philosopher's Stone and the Chamber of Secrets) ===
Harry Potter sets were released on July 1, 2018, including a set based on the Great Hall in the first two movies. The theme also includes sets based on the "Fantastic Beasts" movies. Additionally, on September 1, a 6000-piece microscale Hogwarts D2C set was released for purchase.

Name	Number	Based on	Minifigures
Harry's Journey to Hogwarts	30407	Harry Potter and the Philosopher's Stone	Harry Potter
Diagon Alley	40289	Promotional	Garrick Ollivander
Aragog's Lair	75950	Harry Potter and the Chamber of Secrets	Harry Potter and Ron Weasley
Grindelwald's Escape	75951	Fantastic Beasts: The Crimes of Grindelwald	Gellert Grindelwald and Seraphina Picquery
Newt's Case of Magical Creatures	75952	Fantastic Beasts and Where to Find Them	Newt Scamander, Jacob Kowalski, Tina Goldstein and Queenie Goldstein
Hogwarts Whomping Willow	75953	Harry Potter and the Chamber Of Secrets	Harry Potter, Hermione Granger, Ron Weasley, Severus Snape, Seamus Finnigan and Argus Filch
Hogwarts Great Hall	75954	Harry Potter and the Philosopher's Stone	Harry Potter, Ron Weasley, Hermione Granger, Susan Bones, Minerva McGonagall, Albus Dumbledore, Rubeus Hagrid, Quirinus Quirrell and Nearly Headless Nick
Hogwarts Express	75955	Harry Potter and the Prisoner of Azkaban	Harry Potter, Ron Weasley, Hermione Granger, Remus Lupin, the Trolley Witch and a Dementor
Quidditch Match	75956	Harry Potter and the Philosopher's Stone	Harry Potter, Hermione Granger, Severus Snape, Oliver Wood, Marcus Flint and Lucian Bole
Harry Potter Minifigure Collection	5005254	Promotional	Boggart, Horace Slughorn, Madame Rolanda Hooch and Professor Dolores Umbridge
Hogwarts Express	Spare Parts	Promotional	N/A, in-store build
The Weasley's Car	Spare Parts	Promotional	N/A, in-store build

=== 2019 (Focused on the Prisoner of Azkaban and the Goblet of Fire) ===
Harry Potter sets were released on June 1, 2019.

Name	Number	Based on	Minifigures
Harry Potter: Build Your Own Adventure	11923	Harry Potter and the Philosopher's Stone	Harry Potter
Expecto Patronum	75945	Harry Potter and the Prisoner of Azkaban	Harry Potter, Sirius Black and two Dementors
Hungarian Horntail Triwizard Challenge	75946	Harry Potter and the Goblet of Fire	Cedric Diggory, Viktor Krum, Fleur Delacour and Harry Potter
Hagrid's Hut: Buckbeak's Rescue	75947	Harry Potter and the Prisoner of Azkaban	Harry Potter, Ron Weasley, Hermione Granger, Rubeus Hagrid, Minister of Magic Cornelius Fudge, Executioner Walden McNair and Buckbeak the Hippogriff
Hogwarts Clock Tower	75948	Harry Potter and the Goblet of Fire	Harry Potter, Hermione Granger, Ron Weasley, Cedric Diggory, Viktor Krum, Fleur Delacour, Madame Maxime and Albus Dumbledore
The Knight Bus	75957	Harry Potter and the Prisoner of Azkaban	Harry Potter, Ernie Prang and Stan Shunpike
Beauxbatons' Carriage: Arrival at Hogwarts	75958	Harry Potter and the Goblet of Fire	Rubeus Hagrid, Madame Maxime, Fleur Delacour and Gabrielle Delacour
Harry Potter Advent Calendar	75964	Seasonal	Harry Potter, Hermione Granger, Ron Weasley, Professor McGonagall, Albus Dumbledore, Professor Flitwick and the Hogwarts Architect statue
The Rise of Voldemort	75965	Harry Potter and the Goblet of Fire	Harry Potter, Lord Voldemort, Peter Pettigrew and a Death Eater
Knight Bus	4695	Harry Potter and the Philosopher's Stone	N/A, in-store build
Golden Snitch	Spare Parts	Promotional	N/A, in-store build

=== 2020 (Focused on the Order of the Phoenix and the Half-Blood Prince) ===
Harry Potter sets were released in Europe on June 1, 2020, and in North America on August 24, 2020.

Name	Number	Based on	Minifigures
Harry Potter and Hedwig: Owl Delivery	30420	Harry Potter and the Chamber of Secrets	Harry Potter
Monster Book of Monsters	30628	Promotional	Draco Malfoy
Hogwarts Students Accessory Set	40419	Various Movies	Harry Potter, Draco Malfoy, Hannah Abbott and Cho Chang
Hogwarts Room of Requirement	75966	Harry Potter and the Order of the Phoenix	Harry Potter, Hermione Granger and Luna Lovegood
Forbidden Forest: Umbridge's Encounter	75967	Harry Potter and the Order of the Phoenix	Harry Potter, Hermione Granger, Dolores Umbridge and two Centaurs
4 Privet Drive	75968	Harry Potter and the Chamber of Secrets	Harry Potter, Ron Weasley, Dobby, Vernon Dursley, Petunia Dursley and Dudley Dursley
Hogwarts Astronomy Tower	75969	Harry Potter and the Half-Blood Prince	Harry Potter, Hermione Granger, Ron Weasley, Draco Malfoy, Neville Longbottom, Luna Lovegood, Lavender Brown and Horace Slughorn
Diagon Alley	75978	Harry Potter and the Chamber of Secrets & Harry Potter and the Half-Blood Prince	Harry Potter, Hermione Granger, Ron Weasley, Ginny Weasley, Molly Weasley, Fred Weasley, George Weasley, Rubeus Hagrid, Draco Malfoy, Lucius Malfoy, Gilderoy Lockhart, Garrick Ollivander, Florean Fortescue and a Daily Prophet photographer
Hedwig	75979	Harry Potter and the Philosopher's Stone	Harry Potter
Attack on the Burrow	75980	Harry Potter and the Half-Blood Prince	Harry Potter, Ron Weasley, Ginny Weasley, Molly Weasley, Arthur Weasley, Nymphadora Tonks, Bellatrix Lestrange and Fenrir Greyback
Harry Potter Advent Calendar	75981	Seasonal	Harry Potter, Hermione Granger, Ron Weasley, Padma Patil, Parvati Patil and Cho Chang

=== 2021 ===
On January 1, 2021, Lego released the Harry Potter Hogwarts Crests (31201) under the Lego Art theme.

==== Hogwarts Moment ====
On January 1, 2021, 4 sets were released under the Hogwarts Moment subtheme.

Name	Number	Based on	Minifigures
Hogwarts Moment: Transfiguration Class	76382	Various movies	Professor McGonagall, Ron Weasley and Hermione Granger
Hogwarts Moment: Potions Class	76383	Various movies	Professor Snape, Seamus Finnigan and Draco Malfoy
Hogwarts Moment: Herbology Class	76384	Various movies	Professor Sprout, Cedric Diggory and Neville Longbottom
Hogwarts Moment: Charms Class	76385	Various movies	Professor Flitwick, Cho Chang and Harry Potter

==== 20th Anniversary (Focused on the Philosopher's Stone and the Chamber of Secrets) ====
On April 16, 2021, Lego announced the upcoming release of new Harry Potter sets from June 1, 2021, to mark the 20th anniversary of Lego Harry Potter. Selected sets also include an exclusive golden minifigure to mark the celebration. In addition, collectible Wizard Cards based on the Chocolate Frog Cards featuring Harry Potter Universe characters were also randomly packed into the sets.

Name	Number	Based on	Minifigures
Hermione's Study Desk	30392	Various movies	Hermione Granger
Wizarding World Minifigure Accessory Set	40500	Various movies	Harry Potter, Mr. Borgin, a wizard and a witch
Hogwarts Gryffindor Dorms	40452	Promotional	Harry Potter and Ron Weasley
Hogwarts: Polyjuice Potion Mistake	76386	Harry Potter and the Chamber of Secrets	Harry Potter/Gregory Goyle, Hermione Granger, Ron Weasley/Vincent Crabbe and Golden Harry Potter
Hogwarts: Fluffy Encounter	76387	Harry Potter and the Philosopher's Stone	Harry Potter, Hermione Granger, Ron Weasley and Golden Hermione Granger
Hogsmeade Village Visit	76388	Various movies	Harry Potter, Dean Thomas, Professor McGonagall, Madam Rosmerta, Mr. Flume, Mrs. Flume and Golden Ron Weasley
Hogwarts Chamber of Secrets	76389	Harry Potter and the Chamber of Secrets	Harry Potter, Ginny Weasley, Tom Riddle, Colin Creevey, Justin Finch-Fletchey, Luna Lovegood, Gilderoy Lockhart, Albus Dumbledore, Professor Sinistra, Nearly Headless Nick and Golden Voldemort
Harry Potter Advent Calendar	76390	Seasonal	Harry Potter, Hermione Granger, Ron Weasley, Draco Malfoy, Dudley Dursley and Griphook
Hogwarts Icons Collectors' Edition	76391	Various movies	Golden Albus Dumbledore, Golden Professor McGonagall and Golden Rubeus Hagrid
Hogwarts Wizard's Chess	76392	Harry Potter and the Philosopher's Stone	Harry Potter, Hermione Granger, Ron Weasley and Golden Severus Snape
Harry Potter & Hermione Granger	76393	Various movies	N/A
Fawkes, Dumbledore's Phoenix	76394	Various movies	Albus Dumbledore
Hogwarts: First Flying Lesson	76395	Harry Potter and the Philosopher's Stone	Neville Longbottom, Draco Malfoy, Madam Hooch and Golden Professor Quirrell

=== 2022 ===
==== Hogwarts Moment ====
On March 1, 2022, 2 additional sets were released under the Hogwarts Moment subtheme.

Name	Number	Based on	Minifigures
Hogwarts Moment: Divination Class	76396	Various movies	Professor Trelawney, Harry Potter and Parvati Patil
Hogwarts Moment: Defence Against the Dark Arts Class	76397	Various movies	Professor Moody, Neville Longbottom and Hermione Granger

Throughout the year, additional sets based on various movies from the franchise were released. Additionally, on August 31, a 5129-piece Hogwarts Express D2C display set was released for purchase.

Name	Number	Based on	Minifigures
Build Your Own Hogwarts Castle	30435	Various movies	Albus Dumbledore
Hogwarts: Grand Staircase	40577	Promotional	Hermione Granger
Hogwarts Hospital Wing	76398	Harry Potter and the Prisoner of Azkaban	Madam Pomfrey, Harry Potter, Hermione Granger and Ron Weasley
Hogwarts Magical Trunk	76399	Various movies	Harry Potter, Professor McGonagall and various students
Hogwarts Carriage and Thestrals	76400	Harry Potter and the Order of the Phoenix	Harry Potter and Luna Lovegood
Hogwarts Courtyard: Sirius's Rescue	76401	Harry Potter and the Prisoner of Azkaban	Sirius Black, Harry Potter and Hermione Granger
Hogwarts: Dumbledore's Office	76402	Harry Potter and the Chamber of Secrets	Albus, Dumbledore, Madam Pince, Argus Filch, Severus Snape, Harry Potter and Hermione Granger
The Ministry of Magic	76403	Harry Potter and the Deathly Hallows – Part 1	Dolores Umbridge, Corban Yaxley, Pius Thicknesse, Harry Potter/Albert Runcorn, Hermione Granger/Mafalda Hopkirk, Ron Weasley/Reg Cattermole, Mary Cattermole, Arthur Weasley and a Dementor
Harry Potter Advent Calendar	76404	Seasonal	Harry Potter, Sirius Black, Moaning Myrtle, Lord Voldemort, Horace Slughorn, Nymphadora Tonks and Neville Longbottom
Hogwarts Express - Collectors' Edition	76405	Various movies	Harry Potter, Ron Weasley, Hermione Granger, Train Conductor, Trolley Witch, Remus Lupin, Dementor, Luna Lovegood, Draco Malfoy, Ginny Weasley, Albus Severus Potter, Lily Luna Potter, James Sirius Potter, a Ravenclaw Student and a Hufflepuff Student
Hungarian Horntail Dragon	76406	Harry Potter and the Goblet of Fire	Harry Potter
The Shrieking Shack & Whomping Willow	76407	Harry Potter and the Prisoner of Azkaban	Harry Potter, Hermione Granger, Ron Weasley, Peter Pettigrew (Wormtail), Remus Lupin (Moony) and Sirius Black (Padfoot)
12 Grimmauld Place	76408	Harry Potter and the Order of the Phoenix	Kingsley Shacklebolt, Nymphadora Tonks, Sirius Black, Harry Potter, Ron Weasley, Molly Weasley, Fred Weasley, George Weasley and Kreacher
Golden Snitch	6385434	Promotional	N/A, in-store build

=== 2023 ===
Name	Number	Based on	Minifigures
Quidditich Practice	30651	Various movies	Cho Chang
Gryffindor House Banner	76409	Various movies	Harry Potter, Angelina Johnson and Neville Longbottom
Slytherin House Banner	76410	Various movies	Draco Malfoy, Blaise Zabini, and Pansy Parkinson
Ravenclaw House Banner	76411	Various movies	Cho Chang, Luna Lovegood and Michael Corner
Hufflepuff House Banner	76412	Various movies	Cedric Diggory, Hannah Abbott and Susan Bones
Hogwarts: Room of Requirement	76413	Various movies	Blaise Zabini, Draco Malfoy, Harry Potter, Hermione Granger and The Grey Lady
Expecto Patronum	76414	Harry Potter and the Prisoner of Azkaban	Harry Potter and Remus Lupin
The Battle of Hogwarts	76415	Harry Potter and the Deathly Hallows – Part 2	Harry Potter, Neville Longbottom, Molly Weasley, Scabior, Lord Voldemort and Bellatrix Lestrange
Quidditch Trunk	76416	Various movies	Harry Potter, Draco Malfoy, Cho Chang and Cedric Diggory
Gringotts Wizarding Bank	76417	Various movies	Harry Potter, Rubeus Hagrid, Dragomir Despard, Ron Weasley, Bellatrix Lestrange, Hermione Granger, Griphook, Bogrod, Ricbert, a Death Eater, two goblin bankers and two security guards
LEGO Harry Potter 2023 Advent Calendar	76418	Seasonal	Harry Potter, Ron Weasley, Hermione Granger, Draco Malfoy, Aberforth Dumbledore and Madam Rosmerta
Hogwarts Castle and Grounds	76419	Harry Potter and the Goblet of Fire	The Architect of Hogwarts
Triwizard Tournament: The Black Lake	76420	Harry Potter and the Goblet of Fire	Harry Potter, Hermione Granger, a Merperson, Ron Weasley and Victor Krum
Dobby the House Elf	76421	Harry Potter and the Chamber of Secrets	N/A
Diagon Alley: Weasleys' Wizard Wheezes	76422	Harry Potter and the Half-Blood Prince	Ginny Weasley, Romilda Vane, Ron Weasley, Lavender Brown, Fred Weasley, George Weasley and an Owl Post Worker
Hogwarts Express & Hogsmeade Station	76423	Harry Potter and the Sorcerer's Stone	Harry Potter, Ron Weasley, Hermione Granger, Draco Malfoy, Lee Jordan, Rubeus Hagrid, the Trolley Witch and the Train Conductor

=== 2024 ===
The Hogwarts Castle line started in 2024, stating to be the most detailed Lego Hogwarts Castle to date. It is ongoing into the next several years, and will form the largest and most detailed Hogwarts Castle set yet released.

Name	Number	Based on	Minifigures
Flying Ford Anglia	76424	Harry Potter and the Chamber of Secrets	Harry Potter and Ron Weasley
Hedwig at 4 Privet Drive	76425	Harry Potter and the Chamber of Secrets	
Hogwarts Castle: Boathouse	76426	Harry Potter and the Philosopher's Stone	Dean Thomas, Harry Potter, Hermione Granger, Neville Longbottom and Professor Minerva McGonagall
Buckbeak	76427	Harry Potter and the Prisoner of Azkaban	
Hagrid's Hut: An Unexpected Visit	76428	Harry Potter and the Philosopher's Stone	Draco Malfoy, Harry Potter, Hermione Granger, Ron Weasley and Rubeus Hagrid
Talking Sorting Hat	76429	Various movies	Harry Potter
Hogwarts Castle: Owlery	76430	Harry Potter and the Goblet of Fire	Argus Filch, Cho Chang and Harry Potter
Hogwarts Castle: Potions Class	76431	Harry Potter and the Philosopher's Stone	Hermione Granger, Pansy Parkinson, Professor Severus Snape and Seamus Finnigan
Forbidden Forest: Magical Creatures	76432	Harry Potter and the Philosopher's Stone	Hermione Granger and Ron Weasley
Mandrake	76433	Harry Potter and the Chamber of Secrets	
Aragog in the Forbidden Forest	76434	Harry Potter and the Chamber of Secrets	Harry Potter and Ron Weasley
Hogwarts Castle: The Great Hall	76435	Harry Potter and the Philosopher's Stone	Albus Dumbledore, Daphne Greengrass, The Fat Friar, Harry Potter, Hermione Granger, Leanne, the Mountain Troll, Professor Quirinus Quirrell, Professor Vector, Ron Weasley and Terry Boot
The Burrow: Collector's Edition	76437	Harry Potter and the Chamber of Secrets	Arthur Weasley, Bill Weasley, Charlie Weasley, Fred Weasley, George Weasley, Ginny Weasley, Harry Potter, Molly Weasley, Percy Weasley and Ron Weasley
LEGO Harry Potter 2024 Advent Calendar	76438	Seasonal	Harry Potter, Draco Malfoy, Susan Bones, Cho Chang, Professor Filius Flitwick, Albus Dumbledore and a Choir Ghost
Ollivanders & Madam Malkin's Robes	76439	Harry Potter and the Philosopher's Stone	Garrick Ollivander, Harry Potter, Madam Malkin, Padma Patil, a witch and a wizard
Triwizard Tournament: The Arrival	76440	Harry Potter and the Goblet of Fire	Barty Crouch Sr., Fleur Delacour, Madame Olympe Maxime, Professor Igor Karkaroff and Viktor Krum
Platform 9 3/4 (B&N Take Home)	6541140	Harry Potter and the Philosopher's Stone	

=== 2025 ===
The Hogwarts Castle line continues.

Name	Number	Based on	Minifigures
Quidditch Training	30706	Various movies	Harry Potter and a Hogwarts statue
Hogwarts Castle: Dueling Club	76441	Harry Potter and the Chamber of Secrets	Draco Malfoy, Harry Potter, Professor Severus Snape and Professor Gilderoy Lockhart
Hogwarts Castle: Charms Class	76442	Harry Potter and the Philosopher's Stone	Harry Potter, Hermione Granger and Professor Filius Flitwick
Hagrid & Harry's Motorcycle Ride	76443	Harry Potter and the Deathly Hallows – Part 1	
Diagon Alley: Wizarding Shops	76444	Various movies	
Hogwarts Castle: Herbology Class	76445	Harry Potter and the Chamber of Secrets	Professor Sprout, Hermione Granger and Neville Longbottom
Knight Bus Adventure	76446	Harry Potter and the Prisoner of Azkaban	Ernie Prang, Harry Potter, a sleeping witch and Stan Shunpike
Hogwarts Castle: Flying Lessons	76447	Harry Potter and the Philosopher's Stone	Madam Hooch, Professor McGonagall, Oliver Wood, Harry Potter, Draco Malfoy and Neville Longbottom
Fawkes: Dumbledore's Phoenix	76448	Harry Potter and the Chamber of Secrets	
Chomping Monster Book of Monsters	76449	Harry Potter and the Prisoner of Azkaban	Neville Longbottom
Book Nook: Hogwarts Express	76450	Various movies	Harry Potter and Ron Weasley
Privet Drive: Aunt Marge's Visit	76451	Harry Potter and the Prisoner of Azkaban	Vernon Dursley, Dudley Dursley, Petunia Dursley, Aunt Marge and Harry Potter
Quality Quidditch Supplies & Ice Cream Parlour	76452	Various movies	Florean Fortescue, Shop Owner, Katie Bell, Alicia Spinnet, Ron Weasley and Cho Chang
Malfoy Manor	76453	Harry Potter and the Deathly Hallows – Part 1	Narcissa Malfoy, Hermione Granger, Harry Potter, Lord Voldemort, Bellatrix Lestrange, Lucius Malfoy, Draco Malfoy, Luna Lovegood and Dobby
Hogwarts Castle: The Main Tower	76454	Various movies	Harry Potter, Ron Weasley, Hermione Granger, Neville Longbottom, Lisa Turpin, Ernie Macmillan, Dean Thomas, Percy Weasley, Marcus Flint, Professor Kettleburn, Nearly Headless Nick and Albus Dumbledore
LEGO Harry Potter 2025 Advent Calendar	76456	Seasonal	Harry Potter, Angelina Johnson, Cedric Diggory, Hannah Abbott, Cho Chang, Luna Lovegood, Draco Malfoy and Blaise Zabini
Hogsmeade Village: Collector's Edition	76457	Various movies	Harry Potter, Ron Weasley, Hermione Granger, Professor McGonagall, Aberforth Dumbledore, Katie Bell, Draco Malfoy, Cornelius Fudge, Horace Slughorn, Mrs Flume, Madame Rosmerta and a shop staff member
Thestral Family	76458	Harry Potter and the Order of the Phoenix	

=== 2026 ===
Name	Number	Based on	Minifigures
Dumbledore's Office with Harry	30724	Harry Potter and the Chamber of Secrets	Harry Potter
Mini Hogwarts Castle	40975	Various movies	Harry Potter
Hagrid and Harry's Privet Drive Escape	76459	Harry Potter and the Deathly Hallows – Part 1	Harry Potter, Rubeus Hagrid and two Death Eaters
Hogwarts Castle: Sorting Hat Ceremony	76460	Harry Potter and the Philosopher's Stone	Harry Potter, Hermione Granger, Draco Malfoy and Professor McGonagall
Cornish Pixie	76461	Harry Potter and the Chamber of Secrets	
Hogwarts House Crest	76462	Various movies	
Hogwarts Castle: Hospital Wing	76463	Harry Potter and the Prisoner of Azkaban	Harry Potter, Ron Weasley, Hermione Granger, Remus Lupin, Penelope Clearwater, The Grey Lady and a Dementor
Cauldron: Secret Potions Classroom	76464	Harry Potter and the Philosopher's Stone	Hermione Granger and Professor Severus Snape
Philosopher's Stone: Collector's Edition	76466	Harry Potter and the Philosopher's Stone	Harry Potter, Ron Weasley and Hermione Granger
Luna Lovegood's House	76467	Harry Potter and the Deathly Hallows – Part 1	Harry Potter, Hermione Granger, Luna Lovegood, Xenophilius Lovegood and a Death Eater
Dobby The Free Elf	76469	Harry Potter and the Chamber of Secrets and Harry Potter and the Deathly Hallows – Part 1	
Enchanted Flying Ford Anglia	76470	Harry Potter and the Chamber of Secrets	
Knockturn Alley Wizarding Shops	76471	Harry Potter and the Half-Blood Prince	Harry Potter, Ron Weasley, Hermione Granger, Draco Malfoy, Narcissa Malfoy, Fenrir Greyback, Madame Potage and Mr. Borgin
Hogwarts Castle: East Wing	76473	Harry Potter and the Chamber of Secrets	Harry Potter, Ron Weasley, Hermione Granger, Ginny Weasley, Lee Jordan, Draco Malfoy, Millicent Bulstrode, Tom Riddle, The Bloody Baron, Moaning Myrtle, Professor Severus Snape, Argus Filch and Gilderoy Lockhart
Hogwarts Herbology Plants	76474	Harry Potter and the Chamber of Secrets and Harry Potter and the Order of the Phoenix	
Forbidden Forest: Expecto Patronum	76475	Harry Potter and the Prisoner of Azkaban	Harry Potter, Sirius Black and two Dementors
The Ministry of Magic - Collectors Edition	76476	Various movies	Ablus Dumbledore, Antonin Dolohov, Arabella Figg, Arthur Weasley, Harry Potter, Hermione Granger, Kingsley Shacklebolt, Lord Voldermort, Lucius Malfoy, Nymphadora Tonks, Professor Dolores Umbridge, Professor Mad-Eye Moody, Ron Weasley, Sirius Black, Ministry of Magic Statue
Norbert: Hagrid's Baby Dragon	76477	Harry Potter and the Philosopher's Stone	
Book Nook: Dumbledore's Office	76478	Various movies	Harry Potter and Albus Dumbledore

=== Lego Minifigures ===
Since the 2018 return of the theme, Lego has released two sets of Harry Potter Collectible Minifigures Series, the first in 2018, and another in 2020.

Name	Number	No. of minifigures	Minifigures
Harry Potter and Fantastic Beasts Minifigures Series 1	71022	22	Harry Potter in School Robes, Hermione Granger in School Robes, Ron Weasley in School Robes, Draco Malfoy, Luna Lovegood, Neville Longbottom, Cho Chang, Dean Thomas, Lord Voldemort, Dobby, Professor Trelawney, Cedric Diggory, Professor Flitwick, Mad-Eye Moody, Harry Potter in Pajamas, Albus Dumbledore, Newt Scamander, Tina Goldstein, Jacob Kowalski, Queenie Golstein, Credence Barebone and Percival Graves
Harry Potter Minifigures Series 2	71028	16	Harry Potter, Headmaster Albus Dumbledore, Hermione Granger, Ronald Weasley, Luna Lovegood, Griphook, Lily Potter, James Potter, Ginny Weasley, Fred Weasley, George Weasley, Bellatrix Lestrange, Kingsley Shacklebolt, Moaning Myrtle, Professor Sprout and Neville Longbottom

=== Lego BrickHeadz sets ===
Name	Number
Hagrid & Buckbeak	40412
Harry, Hermione, Ron & Hagrid	40495
Voldemort, Nagini & Bellatrix	40496
Professors of Hogwarts (Severus Snape, Minvera McGonagall, Alastor Moody and Sybill Trelawney)	40560
Harry Potter & Cho Chang	40616
Draco Malfoy & Cedric Diggory	40617
Kingsley Shacklebolt & Nymphadora Tonks	40618
Prisoner of Azkaban (Harry Potter, Hermione Granger, Stag Patronus, Sirius Black and a Dementor)	40677
Goblet of Fire (Hungarian Horntail, Harry Potter, Fleur Delacour, Viktor Krum and Cedric Diggory)	40791
Luna Lovegood & Thestral	40802
Harry Potter & Hedwig	41615
Hermione Granger	41616
Ron Weasley & Albus Dumbledore	41621
Newt Scamander & Gellert Grindelwald	41631

== Video games ==
=== Lego Creator: Harry Potter ===
Two sandbox games were released as part of the Lego Creator series: Lego Creator: Harry Potter (2001) and Creator: Harry Potter and the Chamber of Secrets (2002). Both games allow the player to build their own sets in a virtual world based on the Lego Harry Potter theme, and interact with their constructions by taking control over minifigures or creatures that have been added to the world by the player.

=== Lego Harry Potter Collection ===
In June 2009, it was officially announced by Lego that a video game, Lego Harry Potter: Years 1–4, was in production and released in June 2010. Lego Harry Potter: Years 5–7 was released in November 2011. Both games were released for the PlayStation 4 on October 21, 2016, as part of the Lego Harry Potter Collection, and were also released for the Xbox One and Nintendo Switch on October 30, 2018; the PlayStation 5 and Xbox Series X|S on October 7, 2024; and the Nintendo Switch 2 on October 16th, 2026

=== Lego Dimensions ===
The crossover toys-to-life game Lego Dimensions developed by Traveller's Tales features content based on both the original Harry Potter and Fantastic Beasts and Where to Find Them. A "team pack" includes an additional level that recreates the events of the original film and adds Harry Potter and Lord Voldemort as a playable characters. A "story pack" offers an extended six-level story campaign retelling the events of the Fantastic Beasts and Where to Find Them, and includes Newt Scamander as a playable character. (Note: Upon completing the included levels, players can use the Newt Scamander figure to also control Jacob Kowalski in the game.) Additional "fun packs" add Tina Goldstein (Note: Upon completing the included levels, players can use the Tina Goldstein figure to also control Queenie Goldstein in the game.) and Hermione Granger as playable characters.

== Other merchandise ==
The Lego Harry Potter brand has also produced a plush toy collection, released in 2022.

== Reception ==
In 2020, The Lego Group reported of the Lego Technic, Lego Star Wars, Lego Classic, Lego Disney, Lego Harry Potter and Lego Speed Champions themes, "The strong results are due to our incredible team," and that these themes had helped to push revenue for the first half of 2020 grow 7% to DKK 15.7 billion compared with the same period in 2019.

In 2019, Harry Potter and Hedwig (set number: 41615) was listed as one of The Top Ten best-selling Harry Potter toys in the UK for the 12 months ending May 2019.

In 2019, Hogwarts Great Hall (set number: 75954), Hogwarts Express (set number: 75955), Hogwarts Whomping Willow (set number: 75953), Quidditch Match (set number: 75956) and Harry Potter and Hedwig (set number: 41615) were listed on The Top Ten best-selling Harry Potter toys in the UK for the 12 months ending May 2019.

In March 2022, The Lego Group reported that the Lego City, Lego Technic, Lego Creator Expert, Lego Harry Potter and Lego Star Wars themes had earned for the full year of 2021. Revenue for the year grew 27 percent versus 2020 to DKK 55.3 billion and consumer sales grew 22 percent over the same period, outpacing the toy industry and driving market share growth globally and in largest markets.

On 28 September 2022, The Lego Group reported that the Lego Star Wars, Lego Technic, Lego Icons (formerly Creator Expert), Lego City, Lego Harry Potter and Lego Friends themes had earned for the six months ending 30 June 2022. Revenue for the period grew 17 percent to DKK 27.0 billion compared with the same period in 2021, driven by strong demand. Consumer sales grew 13 percent, significantly ahead of the toy industry, contributing to global market share growth.

In February 2023, Hogwarts Castle (set number: 71043) was listed on "The biggest Lego sets of all time" by Lego fansite Brick Fanatics.

In March 2023, The Lego Group reported that the Lego City, Lego Technic, Lego Icons, Lego Harry Potter and Lego Star Wars themes had earned for the full year of 2022. Revenue for the year grew 17 percent to DKK 64.6 billion and consumer sales grew 12 percent in 2022, achieving growth in all major market groups with especially strong performance in the Americas and Western Europe.

== Awards and nominations ==
In 2001, Hogwarts Castle (set number: 4709) was awarded "Toy of the Year" and also "Activity Toy of the Year" by the Toy Association.

In 2010, Hogwarts Game was awarded "DreamToys" in the Games category by the Toy Retailers Association.

In 2018, Hogwarts Express and Great Hall Harry Potter were awarded "DreamToys" in the It's Showtime category by the Toy Retailers Association.

In 2019, Knight Bus was awarded "DreamToys" in the Movie Magic category by the Toy Retailers Association.

In 2019, Lego Harry Potter and Fantastic Beasts Minifigure Series was awarded "Toy of the Year" and also "Collectible of the Year" by the Toy Association. Also included, Hogwarts Castle (set number: 71043) was awarded "Toy of the Year" and also "Specialty Toy of the Year" by the Toy Association.

In 2020, Hedwig (set number: 75979) was awarded "DreamToys" in the Licensed To Thrill category by the Toy Retailers Association.

In 2021, Hogwarts Chamber of Secrets (set number: 76389) was awarded "DreamToys" in the Licensed To Thrill category by the Toy Retailers Association.

In 2022, The Ministry of Magic (set number: 76403) was awarded "DreamToys" in the Film & TV Favourites category by the Toy Retailers Association.

== See also ==
- Lego Art
- Lego DOTS
- Lego Games
- Lego Minifigures (theme)
