= Brick Like This! =

Party board game

- Publishers: Dotted Games (Asmodee), licensed by The Lego Group
- Publication: August 2025; 1 year ago
- Genres: Board game
- Players: 2-8
- Playing time: 15 minutes
- Age range: 7+

Brick Like This! is a party game published by Asmodee through their Dotted Games subsidiary and licensed by The Lego Group. The game was released in August 2025, being the second game released through the company partnership after Monkey Palace. The game was revealed at the London Toy Fair.

Players describe cards with outlines of Lego builds, and the other player must then find right parts to construct them. The game has been compared to Pictionary, but with Lego bricks.

== See also ==
- Lego Games
