= Lego Disney =

Lego theme

- Other names: Lego Disney Princess (2014-2016)
- Subject: Disney
- Licensed from: Walt Disney Pictures
- Availability: 2014 (as "Lego Disney Princess")–Present
- Total sets: 147 (including promotional sets)
- Official website

Lego Disney (formerly known as Lego Disney Princess which was launched in 2014 until 2016 and stylized as LEGO Disney) is a Lego theme based on the various Disney Princesses and Disney characters involved in different Disney films and television series. It is licensed from Walt Disney Pictures. The theme was first introduced in 2016 and was re-branded theme from the Lego Disney Princess line in 2017. The toy line was accompanied by several shorts and television specials based on Lego Disney.

== Overview ==
The product line focuses on the Disney Princesses and characters who have appeared in various Disney franchises.

In 2019, The Lego Group built three life-sized models of Anna, Elsa and Olaf, to celebrate the release of Frozen II. The Olaf model consisted of 7,714 Lego bricks and measured 3.4-feet-tall. The Anna model consisted of 18,879 Lego bricks and measured 5.6-feet-tall. The Elsa model consisted of 22,100 Lego bricks and measured 5.7-feet-tall. They were placed in Los Angeles.

In 2020, Lego Masters USA judge and Lego Design Lead Amy Corbett said she had worked on the Lego Disney line, which was launched when she arrived at the Lego Group.

In 2021, The Lego Group built a Lego Disney resort hotel model, which was displayed at Walt Disney World. To celebrate its first anniversary, Disney's Riviera Resort was recreated in a near-minifigure scale.

On 8 March 2022, Angus MacLane, the director of Lightyear, a spin-off of Pixar's Toy Story franchise, upgraded the Zyclops Chase set (set number: 76830).

On 4 March 2023, The Lego Group celebrated Disney's centenary.

On 21 June 2023, the largest Lego Disney Mural was unveiled by artists Lakwena Maciver, Amy Jones and Kristin Texeira in London to celebrate 100 Years of Disney. The largest Lego Disney Mural, it measures 4.5m high and uses 220,000 Lego bricks. The other three murals were displayed in Manchester, Paris and New York City.

== Characters ==
=== Mickey & Friends ===
- Mickey Mouse:
- Minnie Mouse:
- Donald Duck:
- Daisy Duck:
- Goofy:
- Pluto

=== Snow White and the Seven Dwarfs ===
- Snow White:
- Evil Queen:
- Prince:

=== Cinderella ===
- Cinderella: In the wake of her father's untimely death, Cinderella is left in the care of her cruel stepmother and jealous stepsisters, who constantly mistreat her, forcing Cinderella to work as a scullery maid in her own home. When Prince Charming holds a ball, the evil stepmother does not allow her to go. Cinderella, aided by her kind Fairy Godmother and equipped with a beautiful silver gown and a unique pair of glass slippers, attends, only to have to leave at midnight when the Fairy Godmother's spell is broken.
- Fairy Godmother: She appears in the garden, and greatly transforms Cinderella's appearance for the ball. She transforms the mice into stallions, Bruno the dog into a footman, Major the horse into a coachman, a pumpkin into a white coach, and transforms Cinderella's torn dress into a beautiful silvery-blue ballgown with comfortable glass slippers. Cinderella departs for the ball after the Fairy Godmother warns her that the spell will expire at the stroke of midnight. With her work done, she vanishes into thin air.
- Prince Charming: Cinderella's love interest. He is a dark-haired, tall, and handsome young man. In the first film, he has no given name. Cinderella's prince is never actually identified in the film as "Prince Charming", nor is there any clear reason why he has come to be known by that title in the Disney vernacular.
- Major: A horse that lives with Cinderella (in the first film) and a friend of the mice. He is transformed into a coachman by the Fairy Godmother so that Cinderella can attend the ball in the first film.
- Lucifer: The Tremaines' spoiled pet cat and the third antagonist of the franchise. Tonally, his existence can be justified to provide a sinister and scheming opposing counterpart to Cinderella's loyal and good-natured pet dog Bruno as well as the birds and mice who are supportive and loving friends and allies of Cinderella.

=== Sleeping Beauty ===
- Aurora: She is the only child of King Stefan and Queen Leah. An evil fairy named Maleficent seeks revenge for not being invited to Aurora's christening and curses the newborn princess, foretelling that she will die before the sun sets on her sixteenth birthday by pricking her finger on a spinning wheel's spindle. Merryweather, however, was able to weaken the curse so Aurora would fall into a deep sleep instead of dying. Determined to prevent this, three good fairies raise Aurora as a peasant in order to protect her, patiently awaiting her sixteenth birthday — the day the spell can only be broken by a kiss from her true love, Prince Phillip.
- Maleficent: She is represented as an evil fairy and the self-proclaimed "Mistress of All Evil" who, after not being invited to a christening, curses the infant Princess Aurora to "prick her finger on the spindle of a spinning wheel and die" before the sun sets on Aurora's sixteenth birthday, also transform Children into Wooden Marionettes by stripping off their energy.
- Merryweather: Princess Aurora's fairy godmothers and guardians, who appear at baby Aurora's christening to present their gifts to her.

=== Winnie the Pooh ===
- Winnie the Pooh:
- Tigger:
- Piglet:
- Eeyore:
- Rabbit:

=== The Little Mermaid ===
- Princess Ariel: The 16-year-old redheaded mermaid princess of Atlantica who is fascinated with humans, especially Prince Eric.
- Prince Eric: A human prince saved by Ariel and is determined to find and marry her.
- Ursula: a sea witch who stole Ariel's voice and is determined to ruin her attempts to get Eric to love her.
- Max: An Old English Sheepdog and Eric's pet. Unlike all the other animals in the film, Max is minimally anthropomorphic and does not speak.
- Sebastian: A red Trinidadian crab and a servant of King Triton, and his main musical composer.
- Flounder: a yellow and blue tropical fish (despite the name, he is not a flounder) and Ariel's best friend.

=== Beauty and the Beast ===
- Belle: A bibliophilic young woman who seeks adventure, and offers her own freedom to the Beast in return for her father's. In their effort to enhance the character from the original story, the filmmakers felt that Belle should be "unaware" of her own beauty and made her "a little odd".
- Beast: A young prince who is transformed into a talking beast by an enchantress as punishment for his arrogance. The animators drew him with the traits of several different animals, including the horns, beard and head structure of an American bison, the arms and body of a bear, the ears of a cow, the brow of a gorilla, the mane, jaws, and teeth of a lion, the tusks of a wild boar, and the legs and tail of a wolf.
- Cogsworth: Majordomo, the head of the household staff and Lumière's best friend, who has been transformed into a pendulum clock. He is extremely loyal to the Beast so as to save himself and anyone else any trouble, often leading to friction between himself and Lumière.
- Lumière: The kind-hearted but rebellious French-accented maître d' of the Beast's castle, who has been transformed into a candelabra. He has a habit of disobeying his master's strict rules, sometimes causing tension between them, but the Beast often turns to him for advice. He is depicted as flirtatious, as he is frequently seen with the Featherduster and immediately takes a liking to Belle. A running gag throughout the film is Lumière burning Cogsworth.
- Mrs. Potts: The castle cook, turned into a teapot, who takes a motherly attitude toward Belle. The filmmakers went through several names for Mrs. Potts, such as "Mrs. Chamomile", before lyricist Howard Ashman suggested the use of simple and concise names for the household objects.
- Gaston:

=== Aladdin ===
- Aladdin: A poverty-stricken but well-meaning Agrabah thief.
- Jasmine: The princess of Agrabah, who is bored of life in the royal palace.
- Rajah: Princess Jasmine's protective pet tiger who displays dog and cat-like behavior.
- Jafar:

=== The Lion King ===
- Simba:

=== Mulan ===
- Fa Mulan: A young Chinese female who is willing to give up her life to save her father. She enters the army disguised as a soldier named Ping. She faces the worst enemy China has ever seen, the Hun leader Shan-Yu, who has an army willing to destroy anything in their path. She succeeds in fighting them and saves all of China single-handedly without any help whatsoever. The Emperor of China awards her for her effort and the whole of China celebrate her return.
- Khan: Mulan's horse with a black coat and white markings on his face, belly and legs.

=== Lilo & Stitch ===
- Stitch:
- Lilo Pelekai:
- Nani Pelekai:
- David Kaewena:
- Cobra Bubbles:

=== The Princess and the Frog ===
- Tiana: An African-American 19-year-old waitress and aspiring chef/restaurateur. She is a smart, hard-working, and independent young woman, but one who works so hard that she often forgets important things such as love, fun, and family.
- Prince Naveen:
- Dr. Facilier:

=== Tangled ===
- Rapunzel : Born with long golden hair as the result of the power of the sun drop, was kidnapped by Mother Gothel so she could use the power of Rapunzel's hair. Rapunzel eventually escapes with Flynn Rider and goes on an adventure that changes her life. Always optimistic and searching for the brighter side of things, Rapunzel does all she can to help her friends and family by showing that nothing can keep her down.
- Flynn Rider: Born Horace and better known as Flynn Rider, was abandoned by his father in order to protect him. Flynn grew up as a cocky thief. His luck changed when he found himself unwillingly rescuing Rapunzel from a tall tower. Since then, he has fallen in love with her and has changed his ways to be by her side by protecting her at all costs until he eventually weds her.
- Pascal: A green chameleon who was washed away one rainy night until he found himself adopted by a young Rapunzel. Considered Rapunzel's best animal friend, Pascal is ever loyal to her and despite his small appearance, hides boundless energy that always comes in handy when protecting his friends.

=== Brave ===
- Merida: A 16-year-old Scottish princess who has been forced to be betrothed to strengthen the bond of a kingdom.

=== Frozen ===
- Anna: The 18-year-old Princess of Arendelle and Elsa's younger sister.
- Elsa: The 21-year-old Queen of Arendelle who possesses magical ice powers and Anna's elder sister.
- Olaf: A sentient comic-relief snowman that Elsa and Anna created as children, who dreams of experiencing summer.
- Kristoff: An iceman who is accompanied by a reindeer named Sven.
- Mattias: The leader of a group of Arendelle soldiers who were trapped in the enchanted forest for over thirty years.

=== Moana ===
- Moana: The curious daughter of village chief Tui and his wife Sina, who is chosen by the ocean to restore the heart of Te Fiti.
- Maui: A legendary strong-willed yet easily annoyed shapeshifting demigod who sets off with Moana on her journey.

=== Raya and the Last Dragon ===
- Raya: The fierce and courageous warrior princess of Kumandra's Heart Land who has been training to become a Guardian of the Dragon Gem. To restore peace to Kumandra, she embarks in search for the last dragon.
- Sisu: A goofy young water dragon who is the last of her kind in existence.
- Boun: A charismatic 10-year-old entrepreneur and owner of the "Shrimporium", a boat restaurant in the Tail Land.
- Namaari: The warrior princess of the Fang Land and Raya's enemy.
- Tuk Tuk: Raya's best friend and trusty steed, who is a cross between an armadillo and a pill bug.

=== Encanto ===
- Mirabel Madrigal: The protagonist, who, unlike her family, does not have a special gift. Director Jared Bush described her as "imperfect and weird and quirky, but also deeply emotional and incredibly empathetic".
- Abuela Alma Madrigal: Mirabel's grandmother and the family matriarch.
- Antonio Madrigal: Pepa and Félix's youngest son, Dolores and Camilo's brother, and Mirabel's cousin, who looks up to her and considers her a big sister. He can speak to and understand animals.
- Luisa Madrigal: Mirabel's second oldest sister. She has super strength and can lift heavy loads.
- Isabela Madrigal: Mirabel's oldest sister. She can make flowers bloom everywhere, but secretly struggles to keep up her glamorous disposition.

=== Lightyear ===
- Buzz Lightyear: A young test pilot and Space Ranger.
- Emperor Zurg: The commander of the invading robotic army and an evil old version of Buzz from an alternate future.
- Izzy Hawthorne: Alisha's granddaughter, whom Buzz meets.
- Sox: A robotic cat and Buzz's companion.
- Mo Morrison: A fresh and naïve recruit in the colonial defense forces.
- Darby Steel: An elderly paroled convict who has been conscripted into the colonial defense forces.

=== Wish ===
- Asha: A 17-year-old girl who wishes on a star to help save Rosas after sensing a coming darkness.
- Valentino: A goat whose wish to communicate comes true after Star's magic grants him the ability to talk.
- Dahlia: Asha's disabled best friend who is a baker and the unofficial leader of the group.
- King Magnifico: The king of Rosas who is the sole keeper of peoples' wishes.
- Sakina: Asha's mother.
- Sabino: Asha's 100-year-old grandfather who is waiting to be granted his wish.

== Toy line ==
According to BrickLink, The Lego Group released a total of 147 Lego sets and promotional polybags as part of Lego Disney theme.

=== Construction sets ===
==== Lego Disney Princess sets ====
In 2014, The Lego Group partnered with Disney. The first sets were released on 2 January 2014 based on several Disney Princess films, with six sets being released. The six sets were Ariel's Secret Treasures (set number: 41050), Merida's Highland Games (set number: 41051) Ariel's Magical Kiss (set number: 41052), Cinderella's Enchanted Carriage (set number: 41053), Rapunzel's Tower of Creativity (set number: 41054) and Cinderella's Romantic Castle (set number: 41055). In addition, the first polybag, Rapunzel's Market Visit (set number: 30116) was released as a promotion. Each of the Disney Princess mini-doll figures are about the same size as a traditional minifigure, but are more detailed and realistic, like the mini-dolls in the Lego Friends theme. The sets were designed primarily for girls aged five to twelve.

Four new sets were released on 1 January 2015. These were Aurora's Bedroom (set number: 41060), Jasmine's Exotic Adventure (set number: 41061), Elsa's Sparkling Ice Palace (set number: 41062) and Ariel's Undersea Palace (set number: 41063). Elsa's Sparkling Ice Castle (set number: 41062) was released in December 2015. Also included, the two sets were Anna & Kristoff's Sleigh Adventure (set number: 41066) and Arendelle Castle Celebration (set number: 41068). A polybag named Olaf's Summertime Fun (set number: 30397) was released as a promotion.

A further two sets were released in March 2016. These sets were Rapunzel's Best Day Ever (set number: 41065) and Belle's Enchanted Castle (set number: 41067).

In 2017, six sets were released, including a polybag named Cinderella's Kitchen (set number: 30551) that was released as a promotion. Later that year, in November 2017, another two sets were released, inspired by Moana.

In 2018, nine sets were released. A polybag named Ariel's Underwater Symphony (set number: 30552) was released as a promotion.

Six sets were released in October 2019 inspired by Frozen II. A total of six new sets, Enchanted Tree House (set number: 41164), Anna's Canoe Expedition (set number: 41165), Elsa and the Reindeer Carriage (set number: 41166), Arendelle Castle (set number: 41167), Elsa's Jewellery Box (set number: 41168) and Olaf (set number: 41169) were released which also included Elsa's Winter Throne (set number: 30553) and Olaf's Traveling Sleigh (set number: 40361) was released as an additional promotional polybag sets. These included three keychains with attached mini-doll figures of Anna, Elsa and Olaf.

The Ice Castle (set number: 43197) was released in July 2021. The set consists of 1709 pieces with nine mini-doll figures of Anna, Kristoff, two versions of Elsa, Olaf and four Snowgie figures.

Ariel's Underwater Palace (set number: 43207) and Elsa and the Nokk's Ice Stable (set number: 43209) were released on 1 March 2022. Anna and Olaf's Castle Fun (set number: 43204) and Cinderella's Castle (set number: 43206) were released in June 2022. The Ultimate Adventure Castle (set number: 43205) was released in August 2022. This set consists of 698 pieces and includes five mini-doll figures of Snow White, Ariel, Moana, Tiana and Rapunzel. Mini Disney Palace of Agrabah (set number: 40613) was released in October 2022 and based on the Aladdin franchise. The set consists of 506 pieces.

Four sets were released on 1 January 2023, Moana's Catamaran (set number: 43210), Aurora's Castle (set number: 43211), Rapunzel's Music Box (set number: 43214) and Princesses on a Magical Journey (set number: 43216). In addition, Disney Princess Creative Castles (set number: 43219) were released in March 2023.

In 2025, the Beauty and the Beast Castle (set number: 43263) was released on April 4, based on the Beauty and the Beast franchise. The set includes ten minifigures of Belle, the Beast, Lumière, Fifi, Cogsworth, Mrs. Potts, Chip Potts, Gaston, LeFou, and Maurice.

Elsa's Ice Castle & Snow Ride Adventure (set number: 43281), including mini-doll figures of Anna, Elsa and Olaf, a Bruni figure and three Snowgie figures, and Ariel's Magical Mini Palace (set number: 43285), including a mini-doll figure of Ariel, and Flounder and Sebastian figures, were released on 1 January 2026. The same day, Olaf and Bruni's Picnic Fun (set number: 43287) was released, featuring buildable versions of Olaf and Bruni with picnic accessories, including a marshmallow on a stick, hot chocolate, and a blanket.

On 1 June 2026, three sets inspired by Moana were released; Village House & Boat (set number: 43282), including Moana and Simea mini-doll figures and a Pua figure, a buildable version of Pua (set number: 43292), and a buildable version of two Kakamora (set number: 43293). Further three sets were released on the same day; Cinderella Animal Friends Castle (set number: 43283), including a mini-doll figure of Cinderella, and Bruno, Gus and Lucifer figures, and two sets inspired by Tangled, Rapunzel's Castle (set number: 43297), including mini-doll figures of Rapunzel, Flynn Rider, Queen Ariana and King Frederic, and a Pascal figure, and Rapunzel's Mini Tower (set number: 43294), featuring mini-doll figures of Rapunzel and Flynn Rider, and a Pascal figure.

The same day also saw the release of Belle and the Beast's Enchanted Castle (set number: 43289), including mini-doll figures of Belle and the Beast, and Lumière and Cogsworth figures, Jasmine's Jewellery Box (set number: 43295), including mini-doll figures of Aladdin and Jasmine, and Ariel's Royal Wedding Boat (set number: 43299), including mini-doll figures of Ariel, Prince Eric, King Triton and Vanessa, and Sebastian, Flounder and Max figures.

==== Lego Disney Parks sets ====
The Disney Castle (set number: 71040) was released on 6 October 2016.

In 2019, six sets were released, including Disney Train and Station (set number: 71044) released on 7 September 2019.

Mini Disney Castle (set number: 40478) was released on 1 October 2021. The set consists of 567 pieces with an exclusive Mickey Mouse minifigure.

Mini Disney The Haunted Mansion (set number: 40521) was released on 1 August 2022. The set consists of 680 pieces with an exclusive Butler minifigure.

On 1 June 2026, Main Street U.S.A. (set number: 43302) was released. The set consists of 3899 pieces and includes 16 minifigures, including Mickey Mouse, Minnie Mouse, and The Dapper Dans.

==== Lego Disney sets ====
Mickey Mouse and Minnie Mouse (set number: 43179) was released on 3 July 2020. The set consists of 1739 pieces. Lego Model Designer Ollie Gregory revealed how he designed Mickey Mouse and Minnie Mouse Buildable Characters (set number: 43179) and explained, "When designing a set like this, it's always important to look at reference," and continued, "In this case we looked at a lot of the original Mickey and Minnie shorts back from the 20s and 30s as well as some of the original character sheets from the Disney archive. From that we can take a look at our existing elements, see what we have that kind of matches the shapes that they have."

On 1 January 2026, The Aristocats Adorable Marie (set number: 43286) was released, based on the character from The Aristocats. On 1 March 2026, two new sets were released to celebrate 100 years of Winnie the Pooh, Winnie the Pooh (set number: 43300) and Piglet's Birthday Fun (set number: 43305). Also released on the same day were Kevin & Dug (set number: 43290), based on the characters from Pixar's Up, and Sally's Flowerpot (set number: 43288), based on The Nightmare Before Christmas. The set includes a mini-doll figure of Sally and a black cat figure.

On 1 May 2026, two new sets based on the Toy Story franchise were released, Slinky Dog Bookends (set number: 43301), including minifigures of Woody and Slinky Dog, and Alien with Pizza Planet Rocket Ride (set number: 43307). Also released on the same day were Blaze's Horse Ranch (set number: 43304), including minifigures of Woody, Jessie and Bullseye, and Lotso (set number: 43306), a buildable version of the character from Toy Story 3. The set features movable limbs and includes Lotso's walking stick.

==== Lego Raya and the Last Dragon sets ====
Three sets based on Raya and the Last Dragon were released on 1 March 2021. These sets were Raya and the Heart Palace (set number: 43181), Raya and Sisu Dragon (set number: 43184) and Boun's Boat (set number: 43185). In addition, a polybag set, Raya and the Ongi (set number: 30558), was released as a promotion.

==== Lego Encanto sets ====
In November 2021, The Madrigal House (set number: 43202), based on Encanto, was announced, and released on 1 December 2021. The set consists of 587 pieces with three mini-doll figures of Antonio Madrigal, Mirabel Madrigal and Abuela Alma Madrigal.

==== Lego Storybook Adventures sets ====
Three sets were released in January 2020. These sets were Mulan Storybook Adventures (set number: 43174), Little Mermaid Storybook Adventures (set number: 43176) and Beauty and the Beast Storybook Adventures (set number: 43177).

Anna and Elsa's Storybook Adventures (set number: 43175) was released in January 2021.

In November 2021, Antonio's Magical Door (set number: 43200) and Isabela's Magical Door (set number: 43201), based on the film Encanto were announced, and released on 1 December 2021.

In February 2023, Peter Pan & Wendy's Storybook Adventure (set number: 43220) was announced, and released on 1 April 2023, based on the film Peter Pan & Wendy. The set consists of eleven pieces with three mini-doll figures of Captain Hook, Peter Pan and Wendy.

In April 2023, The Little Mermaid Story Book (set number: 43213) was announced, and released on 1 May 2023, based on Disney's live-action remake of The Little Mermaid. The set consists of 134 pieces and includes three mini-doll figures of Ariel, Prince Eric and Ursula.

==== Lego Disney Mickey and Friends sets ====
In May 2021, the Lego Disney Mickey and Friends sub-theme was announced, and released in June. The five sets were Mickey Mouse's Propeller Plane (set number: 10772), Minnie Mouse's Ice Cream Shop (set number: 10773), Mickey Mouse & Minnie Mouse's Space Rocket (set number: 10774), Mickey Mouse & Donald Duck's Farm (set number: 10775) and Mickey & Friends Fire Truck & Station (set number: 10776). These sets were specifically designed to be simpler to build with fewer pieces and slightly larger building elements. Each of the sets include Lego minifigures of Mickey Mouse, Minnie Mouse, Goofy, Pluto, Donald Duck and Daisy Duck.

James Stephenson, Senior Designer at the Lego Group stated, "I loved Disney Mickey Mouse, Disney Minnie Mouse and all of their friends when I was younger so designing these sets felt very nostalgic. We hope the new LEGO Disney Mickey and Friends range will offer great fun and role-playing opportunities to help young children learn about friendship, communication and resilience with characters they know and love. With these five new sets that explore firefighting, flying, trips to a farm, space exploration and shopkeeping, we aim to inspire young children and introduce them to LEGO building whatever their interests."

In May 2022, Mickey and Minnie's Camping Trip (set number: 10777), Mickey, Minnie and Goofy's Fairground Fun (set number: 10778) and Mickey and Friends Castle Defenders (set number: 10780) were announced, and were released in summer 2022.

==== Lego Lightyear sets ====
In March 2022, three sets based on the film Lightyear were announced, and were released on 24 April 2022. The three sets are Zyclops Chase (set number: 76830), Zurg Battle (set number: 76831) and XL-15 Spaceship (set number: 76832) as well as Buzz Lightyear's Planetary Mission (set number: 10962) under the Duplo brand. Each of the sets include Lego minifigures of Buzz Lightyear, Izzy Hawthorne, Darby Steel, Mo Morrison and Sox the cat.

==== Lego Disney 100 sets ====
In February 2023, The Lego Group announced two sets that were released on 1 April 2023. These sets are Disney Celebration Train (set number: 43212) and ‘Up' House (set number: 43217). Disney Celebration Train (set number: 43212) consists of 200 pieces with six minifigures of Mickey Mouse, Peter Pan, Tinkerbell, Woody, Moana and Minnie Mouse. ‘Up' House (set number: 43217) consists of 598 pieces with three minifigures of Russell, Carl Fredricksen and Dug and based on the Pixar film Up.

In April 2023, Magical Treehouse (set number: 43215) and 100 Years of Disney Animation Icons (set number: 43221) were announced, and released on 1 June 2023. The Magical Treehouse set consists of 1016 pieces with 13 mini-doll figures. The set includes Lego mini-doll figures of Alice, Belle, Princess Jasmine, Mirabel, Moana, Mulan, Pocahontas, Raya, Tiana, Tinker Bell, Wendy, Anna and Elsa. The 100 Years of Disney Animation Icons set consists of 1022 pieces with one minifigure of Mickey Mouse. (Note: 100 Years of Disney Animation Icons (set number: 43221) is the combination of Lego Art and DOTS themes.) Two new sets were released on 1 May 2023 and based on Disney's live-action remake of The Little Mermaid. These sets are Ariel's Treasure Chest (set number: 43229) and Royal Clamshell (set number: 43225).

In May 2023, Disney Duos (set number: 43226) and Villain Icons (set number: 43227) were announced, and released on 1 June 2023. The Disney Duos set consists of 553 pieces, while the Villain Icons set consists of 1540 pieces with four minifigures of Maleficent, Evil Queen, Gaston and Jafar Genie. Lego Designer Marcos Bessa said, "The selection of characters and films that we reference in this LEGO set came down to a joint decision between our LEGO team and the Disney team we collaborate with for the development of our products. As the model designer of this product, I started off with a proposal of what I felt was a good mix of references — based on my personal favorites — and then we took it from there, trying to ensure we had a product in the end that could appeal to as many different LEGO Disney fans out there as possible. The focus on villains came from the interest in offering something different than what we had done so far within the LEGO Disney products. The Disney Villains are a key element of any good movie — there's no story without them!—and we felt it was about time we recognized the importance of these complex and multilayered characters that we love to hate."

In June 2023, The Lego Group announced two new sets: Peter Pan & Wendy's Flight over London (set number: 43232), released on 1 September 2023 and Disney Castle 100th anniversary (set number: 43222), released on 4 July 2023. The Peter Pan & Wendy's Flight over London set consists of 466 pieces with three minifigures of Peter Pan, Wendy and Tinker Bell, plus a Nana dog figure, while the Disney Castle 100th anniversary set consists of 4837 pieces with eight minifigures of Cinderella, Prince Charming, Snow White, Prince Florian, Tiana, Prince Naveen, Rapunzel and Flynn Rider In addition, the Disney 100 Years Celebration set (set number: 40600) was released as a promotion. This set consists of 226 pieces with one minifigure of Mickey Mouse.

In July 2023, the Walt Disney Tribute Camera (set number: 43230) was announced, and released on 1 September 2023. This set consists of 811 pieces with three minifigures of Mickey Mouse, Minnie Mouse and Walt Disney, plus Bambi and Dumbo animal figures.

==== Lego Wish sets ====
In September 2023, three new sets were announced, and released on 1 October 2023, based on the film Wish. The three sets are Asha and the Kingdom of Rosas (set number: 43223), Asha's Cottage (set number: 43231) and King Magnifico's Castle (set number: 43224). Included in these sets were mini-doll figures of Asha, Dahlia, King Magnifico, Sakina and Sabino, as well as Valentino and Star figures.

==== Lego Lilo & Stitch sets ====
On 1 March 2024, a buildable version of Stitch was released (set number: 43249). On 1 March 2025, a second set inspired by Lilo & Stitch was released, Lilo & Stitch Beach House (set number: 43268); including minifigures of Lilo, Stitch, Nani, David and Cobra Bubbles. On 1 June 2025, a buildable version of Angel was released (set number: 43257). Two further sets inspired by the franchise, Beach Fun with Lilo & Stitch (set number: 43280), including minifigures of Lilo and Stitch, and a buildable version of Stitch with Scrump (set number: 43296), were released on 1 June 2026.

==== Lego The Lion King sets ====
On 1 June 2024, two buildable versions of Simba were released to celebrate the 30th anniversary of The Lion King. These sets are Simba the Lion King Cub (set number: 43243) and Young Simba the Lion King (set number: 43247).

==== Lego Inside Out 2 sets ====
On 14 June 2024, Disney and Pixar released the Inside Out 2 Mood Cubes set, inspired by Inside Out 2, featuring mood cubes and figures of Joy, Anxiety, Foreman and Margie (set number: 43248).

==== Lego 101 Dalmatians sets ====
On 1 June 2025, Disney released two sets inspired by 101 Dalmatians, Lucky & Penny 101 Dalmatians Puppies (set number: 43271) and 101 Dalmatian Puppies (set number: 43269).

==== Lego Disney Villains sets ====
On 1 March 2025, Maleficent and Cruella De Vil's Dresses (set number: 43262) was released, featuring mini-doll figures of Maleficent and Cruella De Vil, and two animal figures. On 1 September 2025, Cruella De Vil's Car (set number: 43277) was released, featuring minifigures of Cruella De Vil and Penny.

=== Lego Ideas sets ===
There are six sets released as part of the Lego Ideas series.

In 2015, WALL-E (set number: 21303) was released on 1 September that year and based on the Pixar film of the same name, a film that Angus MacLane worked on as the directing animator. The set consists of 677 pieces.

In 2018, Tron Legacy Light Cycle (set number: 21314) was released on 31 March that year and based on the vehicle that appears in Tron: Legacy. The set consists of 230 pieces with three minifigures of Sam Flynn, Quorra and Rinzler.

In 2019, Steamboat Willie (set number: 21317) was released on 1 April that year and based on the first Mickey Mouse cartoon of the same name. The set consists of 751 pieces with two minifigures of Mickey Mouse and Minnie Mouse.

In 2021, Winnie the Pooh (set number: 21326) was released on 1 April that year and based on the Winnie the Pooh franchise. The set consists of 1265 pieces with five minifigures of Winnie the Pooh, Piglet, Tigger, Rabbit and Eeyore.

In 2023, Hocus Pocus: The Sanderson Sisters' Cottage (set number: 21341) was released on 4 July that year and based on the 1993 film Hocus Pocus. The winning project's announcement came over two months before the release of the sequel Hocus Pocus 2. The set consists of 2316 pieces with six minifigures of the three Sanderson Sisters (Winifred, Sarah and Mary), Max, Danni, Allison and Thackery Binx as the black cat.

In 2024, The Magic of Disney (set number: 21352) was released on 1 October that year and based on various Walt Disney Animation Studios Films. The set consists of 1103 pieces, including Mickey Mouse with Magic Brooms, four minifigures of Gepetto, Belle, Lilo Pelekai and Bruno Madrigal, and Simba, Sebastian and Flounder animal figures.

=== Lego Art sets ===
Disney's Mickey Mouse (set number: 31202) was released on 2 January 2021 as part of the Lego Art theme.

=== Lego BrickHeadz sets ===
In 2017, Belle (set number: 41595) and Beast (set number: 41596) were released on 1 March as part of the Lego BrickHeadz theme and based on Beauty and the Beast. Later, Captain Jack Sparrow (set number: 41593) and Captain Armando Salazar (set number: 41594) were released on 2 April 2017 and based on Pirates of the Caribbean: Dead Men Tell No Tales.

Mr. Incredible & Frozone (set number: 41613) was released in April 2018 and based on The Incredibles 2. The set consists of 160 pieces and two baseplates. Elsa (set number: 41617) and Anna & Olaf (set number: 41618) were released in July 2018 and based on the Frozen franchise. Ariel & Ursula (set number: 41623) was released in July 2018 and based on The Little Mermaid. The set consists of 361 pieces and two baseplates. Jack Skellington & Sally (set number: 41630) was released in October 2018 and based on The Nightmare Before Christmas. The set consists of 193 pieces and two baseplates.

Donald Duck (set number: 40377) and Goofy & Pluto (set number: 40378) were released in February 2020 and based on the classic Disney cartoon characters of the same names. Mickey Mouse (set number: 41624) and Minnie Mouse (set number: 41625) were later released in August 2020.

Daisy Duck (set number: 40476) and Scrooge McDuck, Huey, Dewey & Louie (set number: 40477) were released in June 2021 and based on the classic Disney cartoon characters of the same names. In December 2021, The Lego Group announced the release two new sets, Buzz Lightyear (set number: 40552) and Woody & Bo Peep (set number: 40553). These sets were released in February 2022 and based on the Toy Story franchise. Buzz Lightyear (set number: 40552) consists of 114 pieces with a baseplate and Woody & Bo Peep (set number: 40553) consists of 296 pieces with two baseplates.

Chip & Dale (set number: 40550) was released on 1 March 2022 and based on the TV series Chip 'n Dale: Rescue Rangers. The set consists of 226 pieces with two baseplates.

In January 2023, Disney 100th Celebration (set number: 40622) was announced. It was released on 1 February 2023, based on Oswald the Lucky Rabbit, Mickey Mouse (as seen in Steamboat Willie), Snow White and Tinker Bell. The set consists of 501 pieces with four baseplates. In addition, EVE & WALL-E (set number: 40619), Cruella & Maleficent (set number: 40620) and Moana & Merida (set number: 40621) were announced, and were released on 1 March 2023.

On 1 January 2024, Spring Festival Mickey Mouse (set number: 40673) was released, inspired by the Lunar New Year celebrations. The set consists of 120 pieces. Further sets released in 2024 were Stitch (set number: 40674), released on 1 February 2024, and Joy, Sadness and Anxiety (set number: 40749), based on Pixar's Inside Out 2, Carl, Russell and Kevin (set number: 40752), based Pixar's Up, and Mirabel Madrigal (set number: 40753), based on Encanto, released on 1 June 2024.

A further three BrickHeadz sets were announced in January 2025; Dumbo (set number: 40792), Eeyore (set number: 40797) and Red Panda Mei (set number: 40798), based on the character from Pixar's Turning Red. These sets were released on 1 February 2025. On 1 January 2026, Angel (set number: 40922) was released, based on the character from the Lilo & Stitch franchise. Sulley, Mike & Boo (set number: 40861) was released on 1 March 2026, based on the characters from Pixar's Monsters Inc. On 1 June 2026, Alice in Wonderland (Alice, Mad Hatter, White Rabbit and Cheshire Cat) (set number: 40925), based on the Disney animated film of the same name, and Toy Story (Woody, Buzz Lightyear, Jessie and two Aliens) (set number: 40860), based on the Toy Story franchise, were released.

=== Lego Brick Sketches sets ===
Mickey Mouse (set number: 40456) and Minnie Mouse (set number: 40457) was released on 1 March 2021 as a sub-brand of the Lego Brick Sketches theme.

=== Lego DOTS sets ===
Mickey & Friends Bracelets Mega Pack (set number: 41947), Mickey Mouse & Minnie Mouse Stitch-on Patch (set number: 41963) and Mickey Mouse & Minnie Mouse Back-to-School Project Box (set number: 41964) were released on 1 August 2022 as a sub-brand of the Lego DOTS theme.

=== Duplo sets ===
Duplo Disney Princess themed sets have also been produced as part of the Duplo theme and were released in January 2015. These sets are twice the length, height, and width of traditional Lego bricks, making them easier to handle and less likely to be swallowed by younger children. Despite their size, they are still compatible with traditional Lego bricks. The Duplo Disney Princess sets are aimed at children aged two to five, such as Disney Princess Collection (set number: 10596).

In March 2023, 3-in-1 Magical Castle (set number: 10998) was announced, and released on 1 April 2023.

=== Collectible minifigures ===
The Lego Disney Series 1 (set number: 71012) was released 1 May 2016 as a part of Lego Minifigures theme, and includes characters from various Disney films, TV shows, and musicals. It consists of 18 figures instead of the usual 16.

The Lego Disney Series 2 (set number: 71024) was released on 1 May 2019 as a part of Lego Minifigures theme and includes characters from various Disney films, TV shows, and musicals. It consists of 18 figures instead of the usual 16.

The Lego Disney 100 Minifigure Series (set number: 71038) was released on 1 May 2023 as a part of Lego Minifigures theme, and includes characters from various Disney films, TV shows, and musicals. It consists of 18 figures instead of the usual 16.

== Web shorts ==
The product line was accompanied by a series of animated short films that was released on YouTube.

=== Lego Disney Princess ===
#	Title	Release date	Notes
1	Create your own Fairy Tale	May 13, 2015	LEGO Disney Princess stop motion series.
2	Sparkling Celebration	May 13, 2015	LEGO Disney Princess stop motion series.
3	The Princess Sleepover	October 30, 2012	LEGO Disney Princess stop motion series.
4	Cinderella in Blown Away	April 18, 2016	LEGO Disney Princess stop motion series.
5	Belle in the Amazing Maze	July 9, 2016	LEGO Disney Princess stop motion series.
6	Jasmine in the Magic Carpet Adventure	April 18, 2016	LEGO Disney Princess stop motion series.
7	Rapunzel in the Dream Horse	July 9, 2016	LEGO Disney Princess stop motion series.
8	Cinderella	September 16, 2017	LEGO Disney Princess stop motion series.

=== Lego Encanto ===
- The Magical World of Disney's Encanto (2021) - An official web short was released on YouTube on 13 December 2021, inspired by both the Encanto animated film as well as the Lego toyline.

=== Making Wonder ===
#	Title	Release date	Notes
1	Disney Princess-inspired Go Karts Made with LEGO Bricks!	April 21, 2023	Making Wonder web series. Hosted by Mari Copeny and Nicole Laeno.
2	One-of-a-kind Minnie Mouse-inspired Dress Made with LEGO DOTS!	April 28, 2023	Making Wonder web series. Hosted by Mari Copeny and Nicole Laeno.
3	Celebration time, featuring an epic float made entirely of LEGO bricks!	May 19, 2023	Making Wonder web series. Hosted by Mari Copeny and Nicole Laeno.
4	Giant house, made of 68,753 LEGO bricks, flies up, up and away!	May 25, 2023	Making Wonder web series. Hosted by Mari Copeny and Nicole Laeno.
5	Explore the magic of storytelling using LEGO bricks and pure imagination	June 6, 2023	Making Wonder web series. Hosted by Mari Copeny and Nicole Laeno.
6	Disney Princess-Inspired Castle Build with Girl Up Made with LEGO Bricks!	August 3, 2023	Making Wonder web series. Hosted by Mari Copeny and Nicole Laeno.
7	Giant house, made of 68,753 LEGO bricks, flies up, up and away!	September 17, 2023	Making Wonder web series. Hosted by Mari Copeny and Nicole Laeno.

=== Magical Adventures ===
#	Title	Release date	Notes
1	Magical Adventures (TIANA: RIVERBOAT BLUES)	September 14, 2023	Magical Adventures web series.
2	Magical Adventures (ARIEL: FEELING CRABTASTIC)	September 14, 2023	Magical Adventures web series.
3	Magical Adventures (SNOW WHITE: APPLE-Y EVER AFTER)	September 14, 2023	Magical Adventures web series.
4	Magical Adventures (RAPUNZEL: HORSING AROUND)!	September 14, 2023	Magical Adventures web series.
5	Magical Adventures (MOANA: TURTLE TROUBLE.)	September 14, 2023	Magical Adventures web series.

== TV specials ==
=== Frozen Northern Lights (2016) ===
In June 2016, Disney announced a franchise extension called Frozen Northern Lights. This brand extension including animated shorts, book series and a TV special, plus potential characterized toys courtesy of LEGO Friends.

The extension's book series launched the extension on 5 July 2016 with its first book, Journey to the Lights, published by Random House by author Suzanne Francis and is 224 pages in length. The ten books in the series will be released by the end of 2017. The film's main characters attempt to restore the Northern Lights' glimmer and face Little Rock, the series' new protagonist.

A spin-off collection of four shorts developed by LEGO aired on Disney Channel, titled:

1. Race to Lookout Mountain (a.k.a. Race to Lookout Point)
2. Out of the Storm
3. The Great Glacier
4. Restoring the Northern Lights

They later aired as a whole on 9 December 2016. Titled LEGO Frozen Northern Lights (also known as Frozen: Magic of the Northern Lights in the UK and Lego Frozen Northern Nights elsewhere), the shorts were compiled as a special and featured the returning voice talents of Kristen Bell, Idina Menzel, Jonathan Groff, and Josh Gad. The special received 2.01 million viewers and ranked fifth for the night on cable.

=== Lego Disney Princess: The Castle Quest (2023) ===
In August 2023, Disney announced a crossover special titled The Castle Quest and produced by Pure Imagination Studios. It premiered on Disney+ on 18 August 2023. It follows Snow White, Ariel, Tiana, Rapunzel and Moana as they must solve puzzles in a mysterious castle to stop Gaston from taking over their kingdoms.

=== Lego Disney Princess: Villains Unite (2025) ===
Lego Disney Princess: Villains Unite focuses on Ariel, Tiana, Rapunzel, Moana and Snow White who face off against Gaston and his villain allies in their attempts to take over their kingdoms once again. The special was released on Disney+ on August 25, 2025.

=== Lego Frozen: Operation Puffins (2025) ===
Lego Frozen: Operation Puffins is an animated special developed by LEGO in collaboration with the Frozen franchise. The special premiered on Disney+ on October 24, 2025.

=== Lego Disney Princess: Magical Mayhem (2026) ===
A third Lego Disney Princess special, Magical Mayhem, was released on Disney+ on August 21, 2026 as part of World Princess Week.

== Publications ==
A quarterly Lego Disney Princess magazine published by Blue Ocean Entertainment was launched from 2020 to accompany the toy line.

== Reception ==
In 2015, the Toy Retailers Association listed the Elsa's Sparkling Ice Castle (set number: 41062) on its official list of Dream Toys 2015. In 2017, the Toy Retailers Association listed the Disney Castle (set number: 71040) on its official list of Toy of the Year Awards. In 2020, The Lego Group reported that the Lego Technic, Lego Star Wars, Lego Classic, Lego Disney Princess, Lego Harry Potter and Lego Speed Champions, "The strong results are due to our incredible team," and that these themes had helped to push revenue for the first half of 2020 grow 7% to DKK 15.7 billion compared with the same period in 2019.

In 2021, Arendelle Castle Village (set number: 41167) was listed as one of the "10 best Lego sets 2021" by official website Pocket-lint.

== Awards and nominations ==
In 2014, Cinderella's Romantic Castle was awarded "DreamToys" in the Build The World category by the Toy Retailers Association.

In 2015, Elsa's Sparkling Ice Castle was awarded "DreamToys" in the Build It And They Will Thrive category by the Toy Retailers Association.

In 2017, Disney Castle (set number: 71040) was awarded "Toy of the Year" and also "Specialty Toy of the Year" by the Toy Association.

In 2022, Ariel, Belle, Cinderella and Tiana's Storybook Adventures (set number: 43193) was awarded "Toy of the Year" and also "Preschool Toy of the Year" by the Toy Association.

== See also ==
- Lego Star Wars
- Lego Marvel
- Lego Avatar
- Lego The Simpsons
- Lego Toy Story
- Lego Cars
- Lego Prince of Persia
- Lego Pirates of the Caribbean
- Lego The Lone Ranger
- Lego Minifigures (theme)
- Lego Friends
- Lego Elves
- Lego Harry Potter
- Lego DC Super Hero Girls
- Lego Ideas
- Lego BrickHeadz
- Lego DOTS
- Lego Gabby's Dollhouse
