= Lego Art =

Lego theme

- Subject: Artwork portraits
- Availability: August 2020–present
- Total sets: 22
- Official website

Lego Art is a Lego theme introduced in 2020. It offers sets based on iconic personalities and characters in pop culture, allowing builders to reproduce them in a mosaic-like format using Lego 1×1 studs. Following the launch of Lego DOTS, a theme mainly targeted towards children, the Lego Art theme is the second 2D tile creative concept to be launched by The Lego Group in August 2020.

== Overview ==
The Lego Art product line launched in August 2020 with four mosaic-style sets: Andy Warhol's Marilyn Monroe, The Beatles, Marvel Studios Iron Man, and Star Wars The Sith. Additional sets based on Harry Potter and Disney's Mickey Mouse followed in 2021. Later that year, Lego released World Map, which at the time was its largest set by piece count, and Art Project – Create Together.

In 2022, the theme expanded with sets based on Elvis Presley, Batman, and The Rolling Stones, as well as the original Floral Art set.

In 2023, Lego Art expanded beyond its original mosaic format with Hokusai – The Great Wave, followed by The Amazing Spider-Man and Modern Art.

The theme continued to expand in 2024 with The Fauna Collection – Macaw Parrots, The Milky Way Galaxy, and Mona Lisa.

In late 2024, Lego announced LOVE, based on Robert Indiana's pop art image, for release in 2025. The release also introduced updated packaging and a new logo for the Lego Art theme.

Further releases in 2025 included Vincent van Gogh – Sunflowers, Keith Haring – Dancing Figures, and The Fauna Collection – Tiger.

Many Lego Art sets include accompanying audio content featuring creators or experts discussing the inspiration behind the design or its subject.

== Development ==
Lego Art was developed as part of The Lego Group's strategy to create products aimed at adult consumers, including people with little previous experience of Lego building. The building instructions introduced numbered colour guides intended to simplify the construction process.

The theme also introduced an expanded colour palette and additional pieces to support different design variations.

Designers used both tiles and exposed studs to create different visual effects and to appeal to different audiences.

The design process also considered combining 1×1 round plates and tiles to create different shading effects, although this could make the building instructions more difficult to follow.

Many sets were accompanied by dedicated audio content accessed through the building instructions. These recordings provided background information about the subject and included commentary or interviews with designers and other contributors.

== Launch ==
The Lego Art theme was launched on 24 August 2020 in the US. As part of the marketing campaign, The Lego Group released four construction sets.

== Construction sets ==
=== Andy Warhol's Marilyn Monroe ===
Released on 1 August 2020, Andy Warhol's Marilyn Monroe (set number: 31197) is based on the Marilyn Diptych painting by Andy Warhol. It consists of 3,341 pieces and offers builders four different colour options. The accompanying soundtrack includes interviews with Jessica Black, a curator at The Andy Warhol Museum; and Blake Gopnik, an art critic. In August 2021, The Lego Group announced Andy Warhol's Marilyn Monroe (set number: 31197) would be retired on 31 December 2021.

=== The Beatles ===
Released on 1 August 2020, The Beatles (set number: 31198) is based on The Beatles rock band from England. It consists of 2,933 pieces and offers builders the option to recreate any one of the four members. The accompanying soundtrack includes interviews with broadcaster and Beatles expert Geoff Lloyd, British journalist and Beatles fan Samira Ahmed, and Nish Kumar, a comedian, TV presenter, and Beatles fan. In August 2021, The Lego Group announced The Beatles (set number: 31198) would be retired on 31 December 2021.

=== Marvel Studios Iron Man ===
Released on 1 August 2020, Marvel Studios Iron Man (set number: 31199) is based on the fictional Marvel Comics superhero, Iron Man. It consists of 3,167 pieces and offers builders the option to recreate any one of the Iron Man suit variations, namely the MK-III, MK-83, and the Hulkbuster MK-I. Three of the same set can also be combined to create an ultimate Iron Man piece. The accompanying soundtrack includes interviews with the former Marvel editor-in-chief, Roy Thomas, and Alex Grand, a Marvel expert, and host of the "Comic Book Historians" podcast. In August 2021, The Lego Group announced Marvel Studios Iron Man (set number: 31199) would be retired on 31 December 2021.

=== Star Wars The Sith ===
Released on 1 August 2020, Star Wars The Sith (set number: 31200) is based on the main antagonists of Star Wars. It consists of 3,406 pieces and offers builders the option to recreate any one of the three Star Wars characters namely Darth Maul, Kylo Ren and Darth Vader. Three of the same set can also be combined to create an ultimate Darth Vader piece. The accompanying soundtrack includes interviews with the vice president and executive creator director of Lucasfilm, Doug Chiang, and Glyn Dillion, creator of the design for Kylo Ren. In August 2021, The Lego Group announced Star Wars The Sith (set number: 31200) would be retired on 31 December 2021.

=== Harry Potter Hogwarts Crests ===
Released on 1 January 2021, Harry Potter Hogwarts Crests (set number: 31201) is based on the Hogwarts house crests in Harry Potter. It consists of 4,249 pieces and offers builders the option to recreate any one of the four Hogwarts house crests namely Gryffindor, Slytherin, Hufflepuff, and Ravenclaw. Four of the same set can also be combined to create an ultimate Hogwarts crest piece. The accompanying soundtrack includes interviews with the graphic designers for the Harry Potter and Fantastic Beasts films, Miraphora Mina, and Eduardo Lima, creative director for the Harry Potter films, Alan Gilmore, and the head prop maker for the Harry Potter and Fantastic Beasts films, Pierre Bohanna. Later, in April 2021, Lego released an alternative set of instructions to provide builders with additional build options namely Hedwig, the Platform 9¾ sign, and the Golden Snitch. In August 2021, The Lego Group announced Harry Potter Hogwarts Crests (set number: 31201) would be retired on 31 December 2023.

=== Disney's Mickey Mouse ===
Released on 1 January 2021, Disney's Mickey Mouse (set number: 31202) is based on the Disney cartoon characters of Mickey Mouse and Minnie Mouse. It consists of 2,658 pieces and offers builders the option to recreate either Mickey or Minnie Mouse. Two of the same set can also be combined to create a united Mickey Mouse and Minnie Mouse piece. The accompanying soundtrack includes interviews with Disney's creative director and character artist, David Pacheco, Disney's character artist, Jeff Shelly, Disney's principal character artist, Brian Blackmore, and Disney's senior character artist, Ron Cohee. Later, in April 2021, Lego released an alternative set of instructions to provide builders with additional options for recreating the characters. In August 2021, The Lego Group announced Disney's Mickey Mouse (set number: 31202) would be retired on 31 December 2023.

=== World Map ===
Released on 1 June 2021, World Map (set number: 31203), with a total of 11,695 pieces, is Lego's largest set to date where builders are able to recreate a map of the world. Builders are also able to customise the look of the oceans, either by following instructions inspired by the bathymetric mapping of the ocean floor, or placing them to their own liking. Tiles can be rearranged to create three different versions of the map, each of which centers on a different continent. The set also features customisable brick-built pins for builders to mark destinations on the map. The accompanying soundtrack includes interviews and travel stories from bloggers and adventurers such as Thor Pedersen, who is the first person to visit every country in the world in one journey without flying. On 10 September 2021, The Lego Group had published instructions for two new alternate builds for World Map (set number: 31203) are Denmark and Europe. In August 2021, The Lego Group that announced World Map (set number: 31203) would be retiring on 31 December 2023.

=== Art Project – Create Together ===
Released on 18 October 2021, Art Project – Create Together (set number: 21226), with a total of 4,138 pieces, is the first set to not be based on a licensed theme and offers builders the option to recreate a total of 37 different designs to be built and combined into one larger mosaic. Art Project – Create Together (set number: 21226) was retired at the end of 2022.

=== Elvis Presley "The King" ===
Released on 1 March 2022, Elvis Presley "The King" (set number: 31204) is based on Elvis Presley, an American singer and actor who was dubbed the "King of Rock and Roll". It consists of 3,445 pieces and offers builders the option to recreate any one of the three different Elvis Presley options. Three of the same set can also be combined to create Elvis Presley playing the guitar. Elvis Presley "The King" (set number: 31204) was retired at the end of 2022.

=== Jim Lee Batman Collection ===
Released on 1 March 2022, Jim Lee Batman Collection (set number: 31205) is based on DC Comics superhero, Batman designed by Jim Lee. It consists of 4,167 pieces and offers builders the option to recreate any one of the three DC Universe characters namely Batman, the Joker, and Harley Quinn. Two of the same set can also be combined to create Batman and Catwoman piece. In addition, three of the same set can also be combined to create an ultimate Batman piece. In an interview, Jim Lee stated, "we have our style and so how do you translate it given these parameters, and still make it look visually aesthetically cool, but also recognizably ours and I think that was a big hurdle," and continued, "first, it was converting the mindset to a different medium. And knowing the image was in a square format was one of the largest considerations."

=== Rolling Stones ===
Released on 1 June 2022, Rolling Stones (set number: 31206) is based on English band The Rolling Stones. It consists of 1,998 pieces. The accompanying soundtrack includes interviews with graphic designer John Pasche.

=== Floral Art ===
Released on 1 August 2022, Floral Art (set number: 31207), with a total of 2,870 pieces and offers builders the option to recreate any one of the three different colour options.

=== Hokusai: The Great Wave ===
Released on 1 January 2023, Hokusai: The Great Wave (set number: 31208) is based on Japanese ukiyo-e artist Katsushika Hokusai's The Great Wave off Kanagawa woodblock print. It consists of 1,810 pieces. The accompanying soundtrack includes interviews with the art curators Naoko Mikami and Alfred Haft.

=== The Amazing Spider-Man ===
Released on 1 August 2023, The Amazing Spider-Man (set number: 31209) is based on the Marvel Comics, The Amazing Spider-Man. It consists of 2,099 pieces. The accompanying soundtrack includes interviews with Marvel senior editors Tom Brevoort and Nick Lowe.

=== Modern Art ===
Released on 1 August 2023, Modern Art (set number: 31210). It consists of 805 pieces and offers builders the option to recreate any four model options.

=== Keith Haring – Dancing Figures ===
Released in May 2025, Keith Haring – Dancing Figures (set number: 31216). It is based on American artist Keith Haring's iconic motifs. The building set, designed for adults, features 1,773 pieces and five instruction pamphlets, one for each of the five figures. They can be displayed on the wall or on stands.

== Reception ==
In July 2020, Lego Art was shortlisted for the Play Creators Awards 2020.

In September 2022, Jim Lee Batman Collection (set number: 31205) was listed on the "Five of the best Lego Batman sets for Batman Day 2022" by Lego fan site Brick Fanatics.

In February 2023, World Map (set number: 31203) was listed as "The biggest Lego sets of all time" by Lego fan site Brick Fanatics.

== See also ==
- Lego DOTS
- Lego BrickHeadz
- Lego Brick Sketches
- Lego Super Heroes
- Lego Disney
- Lego Star Wars
- Lego Harry Potter
