= Lego Brick Sketches =

Lego theme

- Subject: Brick-built portraits
- Availability: June 2020–Present
- Total sets: 8
- Official website

Lego Brick Sketches (stylized as LEGO BRICK SKETCHES) is a Lego theme that recreates iconic characters as stylised portraits. It was first introduced in June 2020. Following the launch of Lego DOTS, a theme mainly targeted towards children, the Lego Brick Sketches theme is the first bas-relief portraits concept to be launched by the Lego Group.

== Overview ==
The product line focuses on brick-built portraits. Each set measures over 5 inches (13 cm) high, 3 inches (9 cm) wide and 1 inch (3 cm) deep and contains at least 170 pieces. Built upon 12 × 16 baseplates, each portrait is formed using either round 1 × 1 tiles or round 1 × 1 plates. It also includes a retractable stand for desktop display and a 2 × 2 inch coupling plate to hang the sketch on a wall to support the portraits. Each set was designed by Lego model designer Chris McVeigh, who was hired by the Lego Group after posting numerous brick sketches to Flickr.

== Development ==
McVeigh was inspired to create brick sketches by the marker sketches of pop culture characters produced by his artist friends. He designs brick sketches using Lego Digital Designer, a free consumer-level CAD program. He restricts himself to a brick canvas of 12 x 16 inches, roughly the same size as his friends' ink sketches. He then assembles the piece by hand. McVeigh explained that the process is more restrictive than with markers as "it's always a challenge to find just the right combination of plates to represent a specific character," and "not all parts are available in all colors, and worse yet, I may not have all the parts on hand."

McVeigh explained how he turns his own designs into official Lego products: "The challenge of Brick Sketches is getting as many details into that small 12 by 16 studs canvas as possible. This was always a really fun thing to do, and I would lose myself for hours trying to rearrange parts and trying to fit more details on that small canvas. Obviously, once I joined the company, this is not something that I could really pursue anymore."

McVeigh said that a core aspect of the design is that most characters have shoulders and noted that "it's always been necessary with a character like Batman who doesn't really exist without the cowl". He said this was continued for other characters, such as the Joker, the First Order Stormtrooper and BB-8 with his "ball body". He said that the coloured backgrounds were changed from plates to tiles to give some texture variation. He also said that one of the earliest decisions was that the backgrounds would remain with cut corners because "that was part of the DNA of Brick Sketches".

== Launch ==
Lego Brick Sketches was launched in June 2020. As part of the marketing campaign, the Lego Group released four construction sets. Two sets were released in 2021 and based on Disney cartoon characters. Another two sets will be released in 2022 and based on the Marvel Comics superheroes.

== Construction sets ==
According to Bricklink, the Lego Group released a total of eight Lego sets as part of the Lego Brick Sketches theme.

=== Batman ===
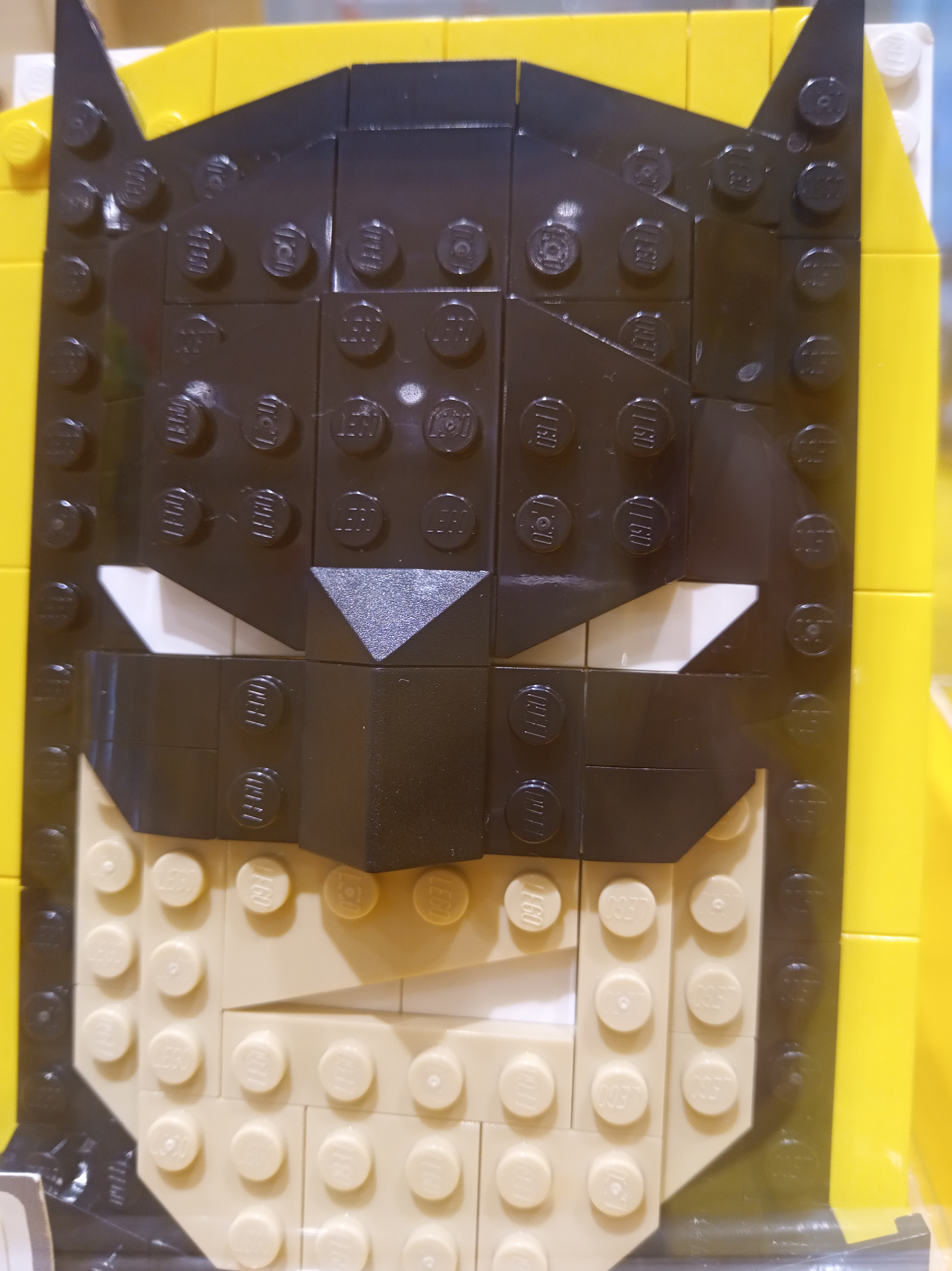
Lego Brick Sketches: Batman

Released on 1 June 2020, Batman (set number: 40386) is based on the fictional DC Comics superhero, Batman. It consists of 115 pieces and can be displayed standing up on desks or hung by its built-in hook on a wall.

=== First Order Stormtrooper ===
Released on 1 June 2020, First Order Stormtrooper (set number: 40391) is based on the fictional soldier of Star Wars, First Order Stormtrooper. It consists of 151 pieces and can be displayed standing up on desks or hung by its built-in hook on a wall. In August 2021, The Lego Group announced the First Order Stormtrooper (set number: 40391) was retired on 31 December 2021.

=== The Joker ===
Released on 1 June 2020, The Joker (set number: 40428) is based on the fictional DC Comics supervillain, The Joker. It consists of 170 pieces and can be displayed standing up on desks or hung by its built-in hook on a wall. In August 2021, The Lego Group announced The Joker (set number: 40428) was retired on 31 December 2021.

=== BB-8 ===
Released on 1 June 2020, BB-8 (set number: 40431) is based on the fictional droid of Star Wars, BB-8. It consists of 171 pieces and can be displayed standing up on desks or hung by its built-in hook on a wall. In August 2021, The Lego Group announced the BB-8 (set number: 40431) was retired on 31 December 2021.

=== Mickey Mouse ===
Released on 1 March 2021, Mickey Mouse (set number: 40456) is based on the Disney cartoon character of Mickey Mouse. It consists of 118 pieces and can be displayed standing up on desks or hung by its built-in hook on a wall.

=== Minnie Mouse ===
Released on 1 March 2021, Minnie Mouse (set number: 40457) is based on the Disney cartoon character of Minnie Mouse. It consists of 140 pieces and can be displayed standing up on desks or hung by its built-in hook on a wall.

=== Iron Man ===
Released on 1 April 2022, Iron Man (set number: 40535) is based on the fictional Marvel Comics superhero, Iron Man in the Marvel Cinematic Universe (MCU) media franchise. It consists of 200 pieces and can be displayed standing up on desks or hung by its built-in hook on a wall. The initial original design of Iron Man Brick Sketches model created by Chris McVeigh which posted to Flickr in August 2013. In nine years later, the original design has been upgraded and became an official set.

=== Miles Morales ===
Released on 1 April 2022, Miles Morales (set number: 40536) is based on the fictional Marvel Comics superhero, Miles Morales. It consists of 214 pieces and can be displayed standing up on desks or hung by its built-in hook on a wall.

== See also ==
- Lego Art
- Lego DOTS
- Lego BrickHeadz
- Lego Batman
- The Lego Batman Movie (Lego theme)
- Lego Super Heroes
- Lego Disney
- Lego Star Wars
