= Toytown Stores =

British toy store chain

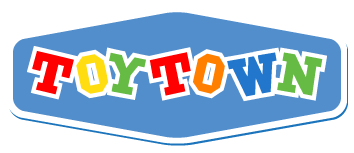
- Type: Private
- Industry: Retail
- Founded: 1979; 47 years ago
- Headquarters: Belfast, Northern Ireland
- Number of locations: 37 Stores
- Area served: Northern Ireland & United Kingdom
- Key people: Alan Simpson (Director - Retired) Kris Simpson (Managing Director) Mark Simpson (HR Director) Andrew Addley (Operations Director)
- Products: Toys
- Website: www.toytownstores.com

Toytown is one of the largest independent toy and nursery retailers in Northern Ireland and the UK. With 37 stores throughout Northern Ireland and the UK and the independent toy retail chain was founded in Belfast in 1979.

== Stores ==
- United Kingdom: 37

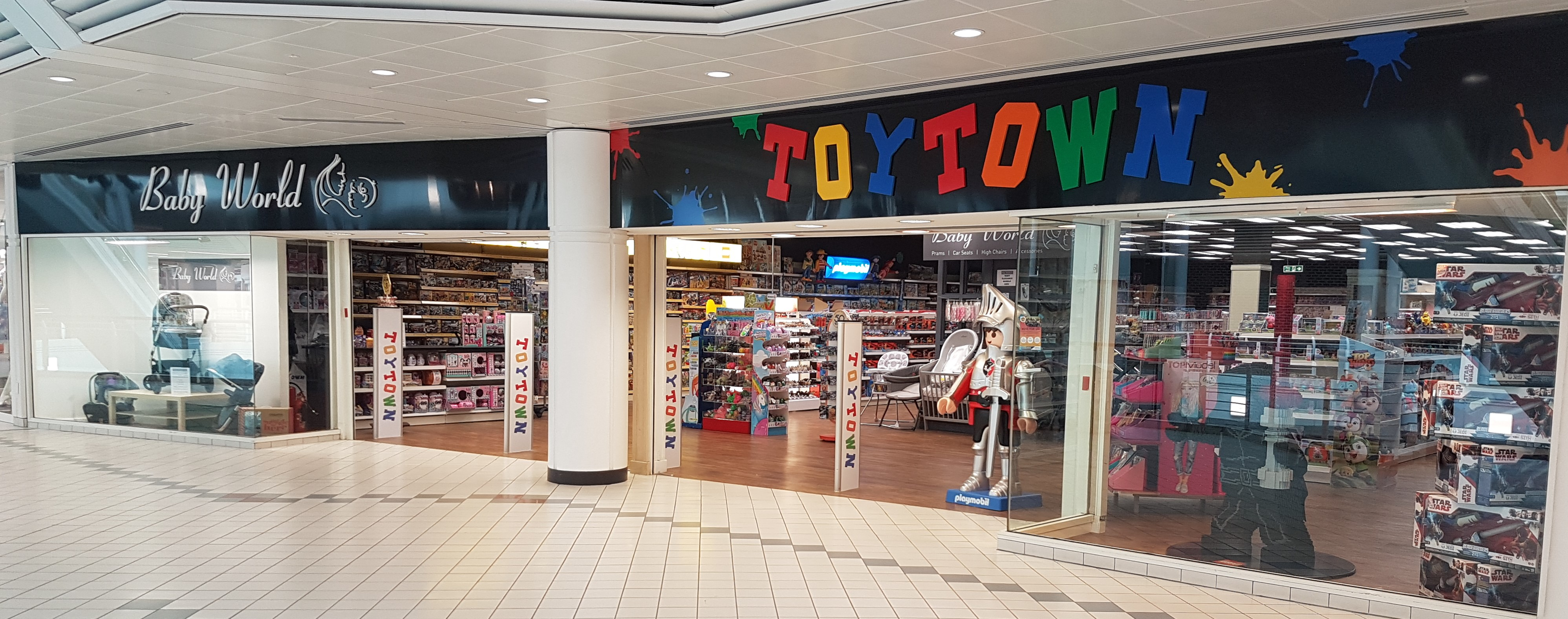
Toytown, Princes Quay Shopping Centre, Hull

== About ==
Founder Alan Simpson opened his first Toytown store on Castlereagh Road, Belfast in 1979. The family-run company later moved its operations to Newtownards where it remains today. After announcing his retirement in late October 2024, Alan passed over the mantle to his sons Kris Simpson and Mark Simpson, as well as Andrew Addley.

== Operations ==
Toytown currently employs over 200 staff and operates 37 stores in total, 10 in Northern Ireland and 27 in England and Scotland.

Some Toytown stores boast nursery departments under the 'Babyworld at Toytown' banner and stock a wide range of prams, pushchairs, cots and other goods.

The company is still expanding over the UK and Northern Ireland, with the latest store having opened at Abbeycentre shopping centre, Newtownabbey in July 2026.

== History ==
After 22 years of trading in Northern Ireland, Toytown expanded into the UK mainland in 2001, opening up in a few ex Beatties of London stores. In 2006 it opened its first concession store, followed by a first outlet branch in 2007.

In 2008 Toytown, due to the growth of their concession business, began to open stores within department stores throughout the UK.

In 2013 and 2016 Toytown won the British Association of Toy Retailers Toy Shop Of The Year award in the specialist multiple category (up to 30 branches) and in both 2014 and 2015 they were shortlisted in the same category. More success followed in 2017 when Toytown swept the board, winning both Specialist Multiple Toy Retailer of the Year (over 25 stores) and the coveted Overall Toy Retailer of the year. In 2018, they were further shortlisted for the Specialist Multiple Toy Retailer of the Year award (2–29 stores). Toytown once again won the Multiple Toy Retailer of the Year award for 2022 on the eve of the 2023 London Toy Fair. In 2020, Toytown were finalists in the Progressive Preschool Awards 'Best Multiple Retailer of Preschool Products' category. At the London Toy Fair in January 2026, Toytown won the Independent Toy Retailer of the Year (Multi Store) for 2025.

2020 saw the company continue with an ambitious expansion campaign, opening 5 new stores and launching a new website www.toytownstores.com. 2023 saw a further 2 stores opening - Maidstone & Wigan. Since then, Toytown was continued to grow with stores opening across the UK in locations such as Coventry and Perth. Other new stores opened in Mansfield and Preston in the middle of 2026 with more expansion planned in 2027.

Toytown were a founding member of AIS Play-Room.
