= Lego Games =

Lego theme

- Subject: Board games
- Availability: 2009–2013
- Total sets: 46
- Official website

Lego Games is a discontinued product range of the construction toy Lego. The theme was first introduced in 2009.

== Overview ==
The theme focuses on a series of playable games of different types, all of which use Lego bricks, and use the Lego concept of building to encourage players to change and adapt the rules of the games.

== Construction sets ==
The Lego Games sets are board games created by designer Cephas Howard, with consultants Bernie DeKoven and Reiner Knizia, that incorporate Lego pieces as components for the game. Most use original themes and settings, though a small number have been based on existing Lego themes, such as Harry Potter Hogwarts which is based on the Lego Harry Potter theme, and Ninjago: The Board Game, based on Ninjago. The Ramses characters represent a mini-theme within the Games line, comprising three of the sets so far: Ramses Pyramid, Orient Bazaar, and Ramses Return. A more promoted subtheme is the role-playing game-based Heroica, with boards that can be connected to one another. All of the sets make use of the distinctive Lego Dice - a solid plastic, Lego-compatible cube with soft rubber rimming on each edge to give the die a particularly strong bounce. Depending on the game, the die can be built with different Lego tiles on its faces which will affect gameplay in different ways. The age recommendations range from five and up to eight and up.

The first Lego Games sets were released on July 2, 2009, in the United Kingdom. These ten sets varied in size from around 100 to 350 pieces. Four of the sets - Lava Dragon, Pirate Code, Minotarus, and Creationary - were later released in the United States in March 2010. In March 2010 four new sets were released in the United Kingdom, ranging in size from around 90 pieces to 120. In the United States five of the original ten games were released in June 2010, with only Lunar Command not getting released. This delay between European and American releases has repeated with each subsequent wave of new games. As part of a promotion for the American release, a tour of 13 different parts of the United States was undertaken from July 2 to September 19, 2010.

In July 2010 another four new sets were released in the United Kingdom. At around the same time, Shave a Sheep and Harry Potter Hogwarts were released in the United States, with the former game being renamed "Wild Wool," with Magma Monster and Orient Bazaar following in August and Atlantis Treasure in October. Christmas 2010 saw the distribution of the special set 2010: Happy Holidays - The Christmas Game, a gift to LEGO staff and partners. A further five sets were scheduled for general UK release in early 2011.

Set No.	Set	Release	Pieces	Ref.
3835	Robo Champ	2009	118	
3836	Magikus	2009	108	
3837	Monster 4	2009	141	
3838	Lava Dragon	2009	131	
3839	Race 3000	2009	166	
3840	Pirate Code	2009	268	
3841	Minotaurus	2009	211	
3842	Lunar Command	2009	271	
3843	Ramses Pyramid	2009	217	
3844	Creationary	2009	338	
2010	Happy Holidays - The Christmas Game	2010	139	
3845	Shave a Sheep (known as Wild Wool in the US)	2010	118	
3846	UFO Attack	2010	88	
3847	Magma Monster	2010	95	
3848	Pirate Plank	2010	122	
3849	Orient Bazaar	2010	204	
3850	Meteor Strike	2010	185	
3851	Atlantis Treasure	2010	280	
3862	Harry Potter Hogwarts	2010	332	
3852	Sunblock	2011	80	
3853	Banana Balance	2011	49	
3854	Frog Rush	2011	107	
3855	Ramses Return	2011	99	
3856	Ninjago: The Board Game	2011	245	
3857	Heroica - Draida Bay	2011	101	
3858	Heroica - Waldurk Forest	2011	225	
3859	Heroica - Caverns of Nathuz	2011	217	
3860	Heroica - Castle Fortaan	2011	304	
3861	LEGO Champion	2011	216	
3863	Kokoriko	2012	115	
3864	Mini Taurus	2012	165	
3865	City Alarm	2012	247	
3866	Star Wars: The Battle of Hoth	2012	305	
3874	Heroica - Ilrion	2012	240	
3920	The Hobbit: An Unexpected Journey	2012	394	
30170	Heroica - Ganrash	2012	55	
50003	Batman	2013	257	
50006	Legends of Chima	2013	211	
50011	The Battle of Helms Deep	2013	338	

== Awards and nominations ==
In 2009, Minotaurus and Ramses Pyramid were awarded "DreamToys" in the Games category by the Toy Retailers Association.

In 2010, Hogwarts Game was awarded "DreamToys" in the Games category by the Toy Retailers Association.

== See also ==
- Monkey Palace, another Lego board game produced after this theme retired
- BrikWars
