= Monkey Palace =

2024 Lego board game

- Designers: David Gordon, Tin Aung Myaing (TAM)
- Publishers: Dotted Games (Asmodee), licensed by the Lego Group
- Publication: October 2024; 2 years ago
- Genres: Board game
- Players: 2-4
- Playing time: 45 minutes
- Age range: 10+

Monkey Palace is a board game published by Asmodee through their Dotted Games subsidiary in collaboration with the Lego Group.

Featuring Lego elements, the game requires players to build a structure as high as possible with the objective of earning "banana points". It received generally positive reviews from critics.

== Gameplay ==
The main objective of Monkey Palace is for players to build a "staircase" structure in the jungle as high as they can for their monkey characters to climb in order to reach bananas, with players taking turns doing so. The game comes with a selection of 231 Lego bricks for players to build the structure with, a baseplate to build the structure on, and a selection of sheets themed to different maps that can be placed under the structure.

Aside from this, the game also comes with trackers for each player as well as cards which guide players on which bricks they can use. As they play the game, players earn "banana points", with the player earning the most being the one who wins. The game is designed for 2-4 players, and ends when there are no more bricks left.

== Development ==
Monkey Palace is the first in a series of board games released through Dotted Games, a subsidiary of Asmodee created in partnership with the Lego Group as part of a multi-year deal. Created by game designers David Gordon and Tin Augn Myaing (known by the alias "TAM"), the game was initially revealed at the Nuremberg Toy Fair in January 2024 before being released that October. The Lego Group also worked with Asmodee subsidiary Bezzerwizzer Studio when creating the game.

Although Lego board games had previously been created through the Lego Games product line starting in 2009, the developers of Monkey Palace stated they had looked to make the Lego system more of a central part of the gameplay, as well as inspire social interaction through it.

== Reception ==
Rollin Bishop of GamesRadar+ gave the game a mostly positive review, rating it 3.5/5 stars. Although Rollin found the game's rules to be well-constructed, he also noted finding them difficult to learn. Hannah Hoolihan, writing for IGN, noted it was "a perfect pick for a board game night that can be played fairly quickly".

Ross Miller of Polygon also gave the game a positive review, calling it a "collaborative art project disguised as a competitive builder". However, while they found the use of Lego unique, they also felt that this limited how structures could be built and led to the possibility of them easily breaking if players tried to rebuild them. The GamesRadar+ review similarly noted that the use of Lego in the game was both "a blessing and a curse".

== See also ==
- Brick Like This!
