= Toy Retailers Association =

Trade association in United Kingdom and Ireland

The Toy Retailers Association
- Type: Trade association
- Industry: Toy industry
- Founded: 1950; 76 years ago
- Headquarters: Bodmin, Cornwall, United Kingdom
- Key people: Alan Simpson, Chairman
- Website: toyretailersassociation.co.uk

The Toy Retailers Association (formerly British Association of Toy Retailers) is a trade association that represents its members in the UK & Ireland. It promotes the role of the toy retailer and the value of toys to the consumer. It represents about 75% of the toy trade. The directorate is based remotely in Bodmin, Cornwall.

== History ==
The Toy Retailers Association (TRA) was first established as the National Association of Toy Retailers in 1950 and changed its name first to the British Association of Toy Retailers (BATR) and then the Toy Retailers Association in 2005. It acts as both a watchdog and persuader to ensure fair play for toy retailers and represents the toy retail sector on government panels and safety organisations in the UK.

== Awards ==
The association organises DreamToys, where the top 12 and top 72 toys for Christmas are chosen every November. The press-only event used to be held at St Mary's Church in Marylebone, London. The TRA also organises the Toy of the Year Awards, an event where the Toy of the Year award and other prizes are presented, including Toy Shop of the Year, Supplier of the Year and Multiple Retailer of the Year. The event is held on the first night of the UK Toy Fair at Olympia, London, each year in January.

== Affiliated members ==
- Argos
- The Entertainer and Early Learning Centre
- Game
- Smyths
- Toymaster
- Toytown Stores

== Toy of the Year ==
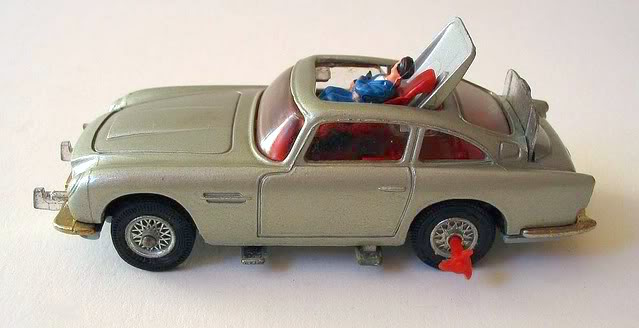
The first winner of Toy of the Year. The James Bond Aston Martin die-cast car

The Toy of the Year awards began in 1965 and are presented annually at an awarding dinner held during the British International Toy Fair at Olympia in January. The criteria are that the toy must have been very popular in the past year and excited interest among customers and retailers in the toy market.

- 1965 – James Bond Aston Martin die-cast car
- 1966 – Action Man (Palitoy)
- 1967 – Spirograph (Denys Fisher)
- 1968 – Sindy (Pedigree Toys)
- 1969 – Hot Wheels
- 1970 – Sindy
- 1971 – Katie Kopykat writing doll
- 1972 – Plasticraft modelling kits
- 1973 – Mastermind board game
- 1974 – Lego Family set
- 1975 – Lego Basic set
- 1976 – Peter Powell Kites
- 1977 – Playmobil Playpeople
- 1978 – Combine Harvester (Britains Limited)
- 1979 – Legoland Space kits
- 1980 – Rubik's Cube
- 1981 – Rubik's Cube
- 1982 – Star Wars toys
- 1983 – Star Wars toys
- 1984 – Masters of the Universe
- 1985 – Transformers (Optimus Prime)
- 1986 – Transformers (Optimus Prime)
- 1987 – Sylvanian Families
- 1988 – Sylvanian Families
- 1989 – Sylvanian Families
- 1990 – Teenage Mutant Ninja Turtles
- 1991 – Nintendo Game Boy
- 1992 – WWF Wrestlers
- 1993 – Thunderbirds Tracy Island
- 1994 – Power Rangers
- 1995 – Pogs
- 1996 – Barbie
- 1997 – Teletubbies
- 1998 – Furby
- 1999 – Furby Babies
- 2000 – Teksta
- 2001 – Bionicles (Lego)
- 2002 – Beyblades
- 2003 – Beyblades
- 2004 – RoboSapien
- 2005 – Tamagotchi Connexion
- 2006 – Doctor Who Cyberman Mask
- 2007 – In the Night Garden... Blanket Time Iggle Piggle
- 2008 – Ben 10 Action Figures 10” and 15”
- 2009 – Go Go Hamsters
- 2010 – Jet Pack Buzz Lightyear
- 2011 – LeapPad Explorer
- 2012 – Furby
- 2013 – Teksta
- 2014 – Disney Frozen Snow Glow Elsa
- 2015 – Pie Face
- 2016 – Hatchimals
- 2017 – L.O.L. Surprise
- 2018 – L.O.L. Surprise
- 2019 – L.O.L. Surprise! 2-in-1 Glamper Fashion Camper
- 2020 – (No overall winner chosen due to COVID-19 pandemic)
- 2021 – Barbie Day to Night Dreamhouse
- 2022 – Squishmallow 7.5″, Jazwares
- 2023 – Bitzee
- 2024 – RealFX Disney Stitch Puppetronic
- 2025 - Pokèmon Trading Cards
