= List of characters in The Lego Movie franchise =

Cast of American media franchise

This is a list of characters from The Lego Movie franchise, produced by Warner Animation Group and The Lego Group, which consists of the animated films (and Lego sets from that film), 4D film and TV series: The Lego Movie (2014), The Lego Movie: 4D – A New Adventure (2016), and The Lego Movie 2: The Second Part (2019) as well as its spin-offs The Lego Batman Movie (2017), The Lego Ninjago Movie (2017), and Unikitty! (2017–2020), and the video games.

== Introduced in The Lego Movie and The Lego Movie 2: The Second Part ==
=== Emmet Brickowski ===
Emmet Brickowski
- The Lego Movie character
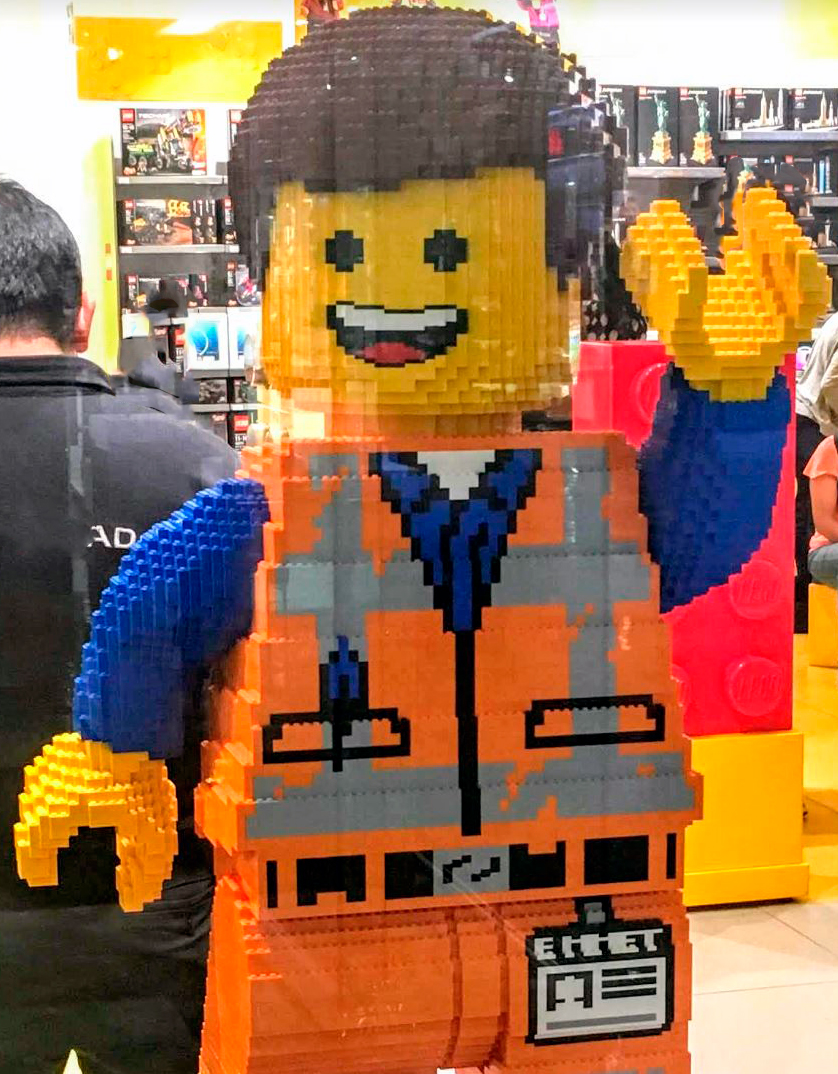
- First appearance: The Lego Movie (2014)
- Last appearance: The Lego Movie 2 Videogame (2019)
- Created by: Phil Lord and Christopher Miller
- Voiced by: Chris Pratt (The Lego Movie, The Lego Movie 2: The Second Part, Lego Dimensions, The LEGO® Chevy Silverado, some shorts and other commercials); A.J. LoCascio (The Lego Movie: 4D – A New Adventure, The Lego Movie: Masters of Flight, some commercials); Keith Ferguson (The Lego Movie Videogame); J. P. Karliak (The Lego Movie 2 Videogame)

In-universe information
- Species: Lego minifigure (human)
- Gender: Male
- Occupation: Master Builder construction worker
- Significant other: Lucy "Wyldstyle" (girlfriend)

Emmet Joseph Brickowski (voiced by Chris Pratt in The Lego Movie, The Lego Movie 2: The Second Part, Lego Dimensions, The LEGO® Chevy Silverado, and some shorts, A.J. LoCascio in The Lego Movie: 4D – A New Adventure, The Lego Movie: Masters of Flight, and some commercials, and Orion Acaba in The Lego Movie Videogame, and J.P. Karliak in The Lego Movie 2 Videogame) is the main protagonist of The Lego Movie. He is a construction worker chosen to find the Piece of Resistance to save the Lego worlds as "The Special" and stop the evil Lord Business.

In the second film, Emmet maintains his livelihood and is unaffected by the aftermath of the Duplo invasion unlike everyone else in Bricksburg (now called "Apocalypseburg"). After Lucy and his friends were captured by General Mayhem for a ceremony, Emmet uses his Master Builder skills to transform his house into a spaceship in order to save them. Through his travels, he meets a space adventurer named Radical Emmet Xtreme "Rex" Dangervest, a so-called "Master Breaker", who helps Builder Emmet rescue his friends. Rex also teaches Emmet how to be tough like him.

Upon destroying the ceremony, it is revealed that Rex is actually Emmet from an alternate timeline who became bitter for being abandoned, and went back in time to convert Emmet into himself and cause "Armamageddon". Rex then sends Emmet under a dryer to complete his transformation, but Emmet resists, with the help of Lucy and the rest of Apocalypseburg and Systar System. Rex fades from existence after being defeated and making peace with his former enemies as Emmet and Lucy reunite to create their new home of "Syspocalypstar".

=== Wyldstyle ===
Lucy / Wyldstyle (voiced by Elizabeth Banks in The Lego Movie, The Lego Movie 2: The Second Part, The Lego Movie 4D – A New Adventure, and Lego Dimensions, Eliza Schneider in The Lego Movie Videogame, Carla Tassara in The Lego Movie 2 Videogame, and Ashly Burch in The Lego Movie: Masters of Flight and a Discover Card commercial) is a female Master Builder who rescues Emmet from the Melting Chamber. She previously was Batman's girlfriend; however, after Emmet saves the world, she leaves Batman and becomes Emmet's new girlfriend.

In the second film, Wyldstyle inadvertently provokes the transition from Bricksburg to Apocalypseburg. In the five years that had passed, she lost all hope things can still be awesome after Taco Tuesday. However, a cheery Emmet always buys her and himself two overpriced coffees every morning and meets up with her. At the end of the film, Wyldstyle reveals to Emmet that she was once a girly-girl with colorful hair and had a similar personality to Emmet. In addition, she was an artist behind Emmet's favorite song "Everything Is Awesome", much to Emmet's surprise.

In Lego Dimensions, Wyldstyle teams up with another Batman and Gandalf to save the Lego multiverse from Lord Vortech.

=== Lord Business ===
President Business / Lord Business (voiced by Will Ferrell in The Lego Movie and The Lego Movie 2: The Second Part, Keith Ferguson in The Lego Movie Videogame, Nolan North in Lego Dimensions) is the main antagonist of The Lego Movie. He is the president of the Octan Corporation and the Lego World. When President Business is not doing his job as a president, he is a despicable villain named Lord Business who wants to freeze the Lego World with Kragle, because he finds the Master Builders' creations combined with his too confusing. In his Lord Business form, President Business wears a fire-spurting helmet, a long cape (which looks like a business tie from behind), and extending leg attachments that light up in the middle. With persuasion from Emmet, Lord Business caps the Kragle and makes amends by spreading the antidote for Kragle

Lord Business appears as a boss in Lego Dimensions in the second level "Meltdown at Sector 7-G" and is one of the many villains hired by the main antagonist Lord Vortech. After Batman, Wyldstyle and Gandalf enter The Simpsons universe, they soon find Business' forces invading as he searches for the Inanimate Carbon Rod, which is one of the Foundation Elements, while his Micro Managers kidnap Homer Simpson. He is defeated by the heroes, but escapes with the rod.

Lord Business has a minor role in The Lego Movie 2: The Second Part. After the Duplo Invasion, Business flees Bricksburg to play golf and is not seen again until the end of the film where his hair is accidentally set alight by Benny and he stumbles into a firework store.

In The Lego Movie 2 Videogame, Business initially returns to his former reputation to take over Bricksburg, but changes his heart again when his robots program themselves to go against him.

=== Batman ===
Bruce Wayne / Batman (voiced by Will Arnett in The Lego Movie, The Lego Batman Movie, The Lego Movie 2: The Second Part, Lego Dimensions, Unikitty!, Jim Meskimen in The Lego Movie Videogame, and Roger Rose in The Lego Movie 2 Videogame) is a DC Comics superhero from Gotham City. Batman is a secondary character in The Lego Movie and the main protagonist of The Lego Batman Movie. This version of the character parodies and satirizes his original comic book incarnation, portraying many of the character's darker aspects humorously to the point where he comes off as arrogant, selfish, sarcastic, and somewhat immature. He is also the author of an original yet unintentionally comical heavy metal song inspired by his life entitled "Untitled Self Portrait".

In The Lego Movie, he is a Master Builder and Wyldstyle's boyfriend, who helps Emmet save the Lego World. In the end, Batman gives Wyldstyle his blessing to be Emmet's girlfriend, calling him "the hero you deserve".

In Lego Dimensions, there are two types of Batman: The Lego Movie Batman, as Lucy's ex-boyfriend, and another Lego Batman described as the "real" Batman, whose personality is more comic book-accurate. In the game's first cutscene, when the two Batmans meet each other, they have a brief argument about who is the real Batman before the real Batman takes Lucy with him to save the multiverse. When the Lego Batman Movie Story Pack came out, the Lego Movie version of Batman becomes a playable character in all six The Lego Batman Movie levels and could be played permanently if the player obtains The Lego Batman Movie World's Red Brick, "Always Batman".

In The Lego Batman Movie, as the main protagonist, teams up with his adopted son Richard "Dick" Grayson, his butler Alfred and the new Commissioner of Gotham City (and his crush) Barbara Gordon to stop his greatest nemesis Joker.

In The Lego Movie 2: The Second Part, he develops a crush on Queen Watevra Wa-Nabi after being among those abducted by General Sweet Mayhem and decides to take her hand in marriage even though he has no interest of being a husband at first.

=== MetalBeard ===
MetalBeard (voiced by Nick Offerman in The Lego Movie, The Lego Movie 2: The Second Part, The Lego Movie: 4D – A New Adventure and Lego Dimensions, Roger L. Jackson in The Lego Movie Videogame) is a large, bionic makeshift, robot pirate and a member of the Master Builders. His appearances are not accurate to the Lego sets such as MetalBeard's Duel (which resembles the original but lacks detailed designs) and MetalBeard's Sea Cow.

MetalBeard originally had a normal pirate body, which he lost in a mission to the Octan Tower, save for his vital organs, presumed to have been preserved in his current body. He later rescued Emmet, Wyldstyle, Batman, Vitruvius, Princess Unikitty and Benny after the destruction of Unikitty's kingdom, Cloud Cuckoo Land.

In The Lego Movie 2: The Second Part, it is shown MetalBeard can transform into other forms, including a bike and a laser cannon, to fight off the Duplo Invasion. After the Duplo Invasion, his body was destroyed and he has to use his treasure chest to move around. However, at the end of the film, his body was rebuilt from some instruments.

In Lego Dimensions, MetalBeard was pulled into a vortex and captured by Lord Vortech as he had one of the twelve Foundation Elements (his Treasure Chest). His body (along with the bodies of Robin and Frodo Baggins) later becomes part of Vortech's minion, the Tri.

=== Princess Unikitty ===
Unikitty as she appears in the TV series Unikitty!

Unikitty (voiced by Alison Brie in The Lego Movie, The Lego Move 4D – A New Adventure and Lego Dimensions, Eliza Schneider in The Lego Movie Videogame, Tara Strong in Unikitty! and a DFS commercial, Alexandra Ryan in The Lego Movie 2 Videogame) is a half unicorn and half anime kitten and a Master Builder who rules a secret sky location called Cloud Cuckoo Land, where there are no rules or unhappy things. She is energetic and tries to remain positive no matter the situation but sometimes gives way to anger, transforming into a monstrous red and orange version of herself.

She is first seen welcoming Emmet, Wyldstyle, Vitruvius and Batman to Cloud Cuckoo Land and attending the meeting of the Master Builders, joining the trio in their quest to save the Lego World after her home is destroyed.

In 2017, Unikitty was given a spinoff TV series of the same name, produced for Cartoon Network. In this show, Princess Unikitty is the ruler of the Unikingdom and has a little brother named Prince Puppycorn.

She makes a silent cameo appearance in The Lego Ninjago Movie.

In The Lego Movie 2: The Second Part, Unikitty is shown to be Emmet and Lucy's pet cat and demonstrates a new form called Ultrakatty, born from her repressed rage during the Duplo invasion.

=== Benny ===
Benny (voiced by Charlie Day in The Lego Movie, The Lego Movie 2: The Second Part, The Lego Movie: 4D – A New Adventure and Lego Dimensions, Mark Silverman in The Lego Movie Videogame, and Jon Luke Thomas in The Lego Movie 2 Videogame) is a blue "1980-something space guy" with a damaged space helmet and worn-off chest printing who loves to build blue classic-style Lego spaceships. He's also a Master Builder and helps Emmet to save the Lego World.

While attending a meeting with the Master Builders at Cloud Cuckoo Land, Benny was among those who join Emmet in the escape from the Super Secret Police. Both times in Cloud Cuckoo Land and on MetalBeard's ship, he tried to build a spaceship only to have his plans cancelled. During the escape from the Octan Tower upon Bad Cop approving the idea, Benny is finally able to make a spaceship which the others use to make their way back to Bricksburg.

In The Lego Movie 2: The Second Part, Benny loses his right arm in the invasion of Bricksburg and is given a metallic one. He was captured with Lucy, Batman, Unikitty, and MetalBeard and taken to another planet where he met other spacemen. When the characters in The Lego Movie 2 sing "Everything's Not Awesome" in the storage bin, Benny, among those who have mature feelings, expresses his new found interest in Radiohead. By the end of the film, Benny exchanges helmets with General Sweet Mayhem and accidentally sets President Business' hair on fire.

=== Bad Cop / Good Cop ===
Bad Cop / Good Cop (voiced by Liam Neeson in The Lego Movie, Bradley Pierce in The Lego Movie Videogame) is a police officer with a double-sided head (a fairly common feature in Lego minifigures) and is named after the good cop, bad cop interrogation method. One face is the selfish, rude, mean, and bad one, which is mostly shown with Lord Business and when he questions people, while the other one is good, kind, nice, and friendly. Besides being the son of Ma Cop and Pa Cop, Bad Cop/Good Cop is the leader of the Super Secret Police and works for Lord Business to find the Special. He is a major antagonist in the first movie.

He first appears as he interrogates Emmet about the Master Builders and fed up with Emmet's refusal to admit anything, sends Emmet to the Melting Chamber. When Wyldstyle frees Emmet, Bad Cop and his forces pursue them to one of the secret tunnels. During a meeting with Lord Business, Bad Cop/Good Cop is introduced to a prototype of the Kraglized weapon that he is going to use on Taco Tuesday. Lord Business tests Bad Cop's faithfulness and loyalty by requesting him to test it on his parents. However, both his faces get into an argument and eventually he turns into Good Cop, with his conscience rendering him unable to "Kraglise" his parents. Realizing Good Cop is taking over, Lord Business uses nail polish remover and a q-tip to erase Good Cop's face, thereby enabling Bad Cop to do the job to his parents' horror. Bad Cop later grows remorseful and helps the Master Builders escape and uses a marker to draw a scribble face to replace the Good Cop face he lost. After the Kragle is disarmed, Bad Cop/Good Cop is reunited with his parents.

In The Lego Movie 2: The Second Part, Bad Cop is a security guard for Apocalypseburg and has no dialogue.

=== Vitruvius ===
Vitruvius (voiced by Morgan Freeman in The Lego Movie, Josh Robert Thompson in The Lego Movie Videogame, and Neil Kaplan in The Lego Movie 2 Videogame) is a blind old wizard and a teacher of Wyldstyle. Vitruvius is one of the most important members of the Master Builders and the one who believes that Emmet will save the world. He wields a green staff that looks like a bent eaten lollipop.

In one of his earlier encounters with Lord Business, Vitruvius was blinded by him and made up a prophecy of the Special. During the confrontation in the Octan Tower's Think Tank, Vitruvius is beheaded by Lord Business with a penny. Upon his death, Vitruvius returns as a ghost.

=== The Man Upstairs ===
The Man Upstairs (portrayed by Will Ferrell) is an unnamed adult Lego collector and the father of Finn who appears in the live-action part of the film. He comes home from work and chastises his son for "ruining" the set by creating variations of different playsets while stating that he left the child blocks for him and his sister to use. With every Krazy Glue in his possession, "The Man Upstairs" proceeds to permanently rebuild and glue his perceived perfect creations back together. Eventually, he finds that Finn based Lord Business off of him and joins Finn into removing the Krazy Glue from him. Upon being called up to Taco Tuesday by Finn's mom, "The Man Upstairs" tells Finn that he will now allow his younger sister to play with them. This resulted in aliens from the planet Duplo beaming down and announcing their plans to destroy them.

Apart from flashbacks from the first film, "The Man Upstairs" does not appear on-screen in the second film. However, a photo of him and his family on a log flume ride can be seen in his daughter Bianca's bedroom. His voice is heard when Finn and Bianca's mother talks to them about putting the Legos into storage as he tells them to listen to what their mother said. "The Man Upstairs" is later heard at the end of the movie asking "Honey, where are my pants?" in a reference to the sitcom from the first film.

=== Finn ===
Finn (portrayed by Jadon Sand in The Lego Movie and The Lego Movie 2: The Second Part, Graham Miller as a younger kid in The Lego Movie 2: The Second Part) is a boy who is the son of "The Man Upstairs". He created the world of Lego, all the events and the characters, including Emmet.

=== Mom ===
Mom (voiced by Amanda Farinos in The Lego Movie, portrayed by Maya Rudolph in The Lego Movie 2: The Second Part) is the unnamed wife of The Man Upstairs and the mother of Finn and Bianca.

Her voice is heard in The Lego Movie when she tells her husband and son that the tacos are ready.

In The Lego Movie 2: The Second Part, she is fully seen where she has brown hair. A recurring gag in the film is when she steps on Lego pieces with her foot causing her to scream "Ayeeee!" due to her being barefoot at the time. She even says that the pain is close to the pain she had during childbirth. The mother is the source of the "Armamageddon" (Our Mama Gets In) in which she is tired of Finn and Bianca fighting over their LEGO bricks and nearly has their figures all shut up in storage. This started "Armamageddon" which Rex Dangervest took advantage of. After Rex is defeated and Finn and Bianca reconcile, their mom watches them play with their father's Lego sets until she hears her husband asking her where his pants are.

=== Ma Cop and Pa Cop ===
Ma Cop and Pa Cop (voiced by Melissa Sturm and Liam Neeson) are police officers who are the parents of Bad Cop/Good Cop. Lord Business brought them in as a demonstration to Bad Cop on the Kragle weapon that he will be using on Taco Tuesday. When Good Cop refuses to use the weapon on them, Lord Business erased his Good Cop face much to the horror of his parents. Bad Cop then uses the Kragle weapon on them. By the end of the movie, Ma Cop and Pa Cop are freed from the Kragle and reunited with their son.

=== Star Wars characters ===
The following characters from Star Wars appear in the first film:

==== Han Solo ====
Han Solo (voiced by Keith Ferguson) appears from nowhere in the Millennium Falcon when Emmet and the Master Builders are arguing about where to get a hyperdrive from in order to invade Lord Business' tower. He complains to Chewbacca about their hyperdrive malfunctioning and they should not be in the "loser system" that the Lego characters are in. However, Lando Calrissian points out that Wyldstyle is a pretty girl, and it is clear Lando has fallen for her.

Batman engages in a brief chat with Wyldstyle, and suddenly uses a grapple cable to jump onto the Falcon, attempting to socialise with the 20th Century Studios Star Wars cast members. This leaves Wyldstyle heartbroken and Emmet disappointed. Just as they discuss about Batman being "blind" and "a bad partner", the Dark Knight suddenly reappears behind Emmet with the hyperdrive. Benny then asks "...But won't they know their hyperdrive is missing?".

The scene then shows the recreation of a scene from The Empire Strikes Back, which was released on May 21, 1980, where the 20th Century Studios Star Wars characters are escaping from an asteroid with a Space Slug. Han tells Chewie to "hit the hyperdrive", but the spaceship fails. The Space Slug then emerges and swallows the Falcon.

==== Lando Calrissian ====
Lando Calrissian (voiced by Billy Dee Williams) is a friend of Han Solo. He is present with Han on the Millennium Falcon. Williams reprises his role from the 20th Century Studios Star Wars films He briefly flirts with Wyldstyle, which prompts her to remark that she has a boyfriend (Batman).

==== C-3PO ====
C-3PO (voiced by Anthony Daniels) is a droid. He is present with Han on the Millennium Falcon and states to him that they are late to a party. Daniels also reprises his role.

==== Chewbacca ====
Chewbacca is a Wookiee who is the partner of Han Solo. He is present with Han on the Millennium Falcon, brandishing a chicken leg.

=== Master Builders ===
The Master Builders are a group of Lego minifigures who can build things without instructions. It is shown that the Master Builders meet in the "Dog" part of Cloud Cuckoo Land to discuss various issues. Their creative ways caused Lord Business to form the Super Secret Police to hunt them down.

==== Superman ====
Clark Kent / Superman (voiced by Channing Tatum in The Lego Movie, The Lego Batman Movie and The Lego Movie 2: The Second Part, Nolan North in Lego Dimensions, and Travis Willingham in The Lego Movie 2 Videogame) is a DC Comics superhero, member of the Justice League, and Master Builder.

In The Lego Movie, Superman is shown to be annoyed by Green Lantern and was among the Master Builders that attend the meeting in Cloud Cuckoo Land. During the attack on Cloud Cuckoo Land, Superman took down one of the Super Secret Police's vehicles before being immobilized by a wad of gum leading to his capture.

In The Lego Batman Movie, he and Batman are shown to have a hostile relationship similar to how they started out in Batman v Superman: Dawn of Justice during one confrontation with Joker. Superman appears on the news program "Metropolis in Focus" where he has just sent General Zod to the Phantom Zone. When interviewed by Reporter Pippa, Superman describes the Phantom Zone to hold the universe's worst villains, which inspires the Joker for his plans with the Phantom Zone Projector. Superman is seen hosting the 57th Annual Justice League Anniversary Party at the Fortress of Solitude, which he neglected to invite Batman to and had to come up with various cover-ups to explain why Batman did not get an invitation.

In The Lego Movie 2: The Second Part, Superman and the rest of the Justice League go out to save the world from The Duplo Invasion, but fails to return five years later. Later, it is revealed that Superman and the others members are in Harmony Town on another planet in the Systar Galaxy. Emmet encounters him using the alias of Sillyman after being brainwashed by Queen Watevra Wa'Nabi.

==== Wonder Woman ====
Diana Prince / Wonder Woman (voiced by Cobie Smulders) is a DC Comics superhero, member of the Justice League, and Master Builder.

In The Lego Movie, Wonder Woman is among the Master Builders who attend the meeting in Cloud Cuckoo Land. But, during the Super Secret Police's attack on Cloud Cuckoo Land, Wonder Woman's Invisible Jet is destroyed. She is among the Master Builders that are captured.

In The Lego Batman Movie, Wonder Woman is seen attending the 57th Annual Justice League Anniversary Party at the Fortress of Solitude where she has no dialogue.

In The Lego Movie 2: The Second Part, Wonder Woman and the rest of the Justice League go out to save the world from The Duplo Invasion, but fails to return 5 years later. Later, it is revealed that Wonder Woman and the other members of the Justice League are in Harmony Town on another planet brainwashed by Queen Watevra Wa'Nabi. Also, a mini-doll of Wonder Woman's Lego DC Super Hero Girls counterpart (voiced by Margot Rubin) and a Duplo version of Wonder Woman from Lego Duplo make minor appearances as citizens of Harmony Town. The mini-doll version was riding a two-person bicycle with Wonder Woman while the Duplo version was riding a normal bicycle.

==== Aquaman ====
Arthur Curry / Aquaman (voiced by Jason Momoa in The Lego Movie 2: The Second Part, and Lex Lang in The Lego Movie 2 Videogame) is a DC Comics superhero, member of the Justice League, and a Master Builder.

In The Lego Movie, Aquaman was seen at the end in the background as Bad Cop/Good Cop reunites with his parents.

In The Lego Batman Movie, Aquaman was among the DC heroes who were dancing at the 57th annual Justice League anniversary party.

In The Lego Movie 2: The Second Part, Aquaman (who resembles the Jason Momoa version) and the rest of the Justice League go out to save the world from the Duplo invasion, but fails to return 5 years later. Later, it is revealed that Aquaman and the other members are in Harmony Town on another planet where they were brainwashed by Queen Watevra Wa'Nabi. Aquaman informs Superman, Green Lantern, and Lex Luthor that General Zod made guacamole. Another version of Aquaman appears in the film called "Rip-off Aquaman" as he appears with Larry Poppins.

Momoa reprises his role from the DC Extended Universe.

==== Green Lantern ====
Hal Jordan / Green Lantern (voiced by Jonah Hill) is a DC Comics superhero, member of the Justice League, and Master Builder who is a nuisance to Superman.

In The Lego Movie, Green Lantern is among the Master Builders who meet in Cloud Cuckoo Land and tries to interact with Superman. During the attack on Cloud Cuckoo Land, Green Lantern tries to get Superman out of the wad of gum he's trapped in which doesn't work and leads to both of them getting captured by the Super Secret Police, to which Superman comments "I super hate you!". He later appears in a cell next to the Man of Steel after both get taken to the Think Tank, and the latter asks somebody for some Kryptonite, presumably so he can commit suicide.

In The Lego Batman Movie, Green Lantern was seen at the 57th Annual Justice League Anniversary Party at the Fortress of Solitude. When Superman claims to Batman that there must've been a problem with the E-Mails as a cover-up for why Batman wasn't invited to the 57th Annual Justice League Anniversary Party, Green Lantern states that he sometimes never gets Superman's E-Mails for years.

In The Lego Movie 2: The Second Part, Green Lantern and the rest of the Justice League go out to save the world from the iuplo Invasion, but fails to return 5 years later. Later, it is revealed that Green Lantern and the others members are in Harmony Town on another planet where they were brainwashed by Queen Watevra Wa'Nabi.

==== The Flash ====
Barry Allen / The Flash (voiced by Adam DeVine in The Lego Batman Movie) is a DC Comics superhero, member of the Justice League and Master Builder who possesses superhuman reflexes and reaction time.

In The Lego Movie, he was part of MetalBeard's earlier attack on the Octan Tower, which led to his capture. He is later seen at the end of the movie with the other DC Comics superheroes.

In The Lego Batman Movie, Flash is seen attending the 57th Annual Justice League Anniversary Party and asks Batman to take a picture of the whole Justice League. This leaves Batman disappointed because he was not in the picture despite being a member.

Flash makes a cameo appearance in The Lego Movie 2: The Second Part, but has no dialogue.

==== 2002 NBA All Stars ====
The 2002 NBA All-Stars are basketball players who are Master Builders. They consist of a Lego caricature of Shaquille O'Neal (voiced by himself) and two unnamed basketball players.

In The Lego Movie, the 2002 NBA All-Stars were among the Master Builders who meet in Cloud Cuckoo Land. During the attack on Cloud Cuckoo Land, the 2002 NBA All-Stars alongside two Spacemen and the Swamp Creature try to use a catapult on the vehicles of the Super Secret Police to no avail as the vehicles are all Kraglized. They are captured by the Super Secret Police.

==== Abraham Lincoln ====
Abraham Lincoln (voiced by Will Forte in The Lego Movie and The Lego Movie 2: The Second Part, and Mark Silverman in The Lego Movie 2 Videogame) is the 16th President of the United States and a Master Builder who rides in a rocket version of his armchair with a footrest that is similar to the one seen in the statue of him.

In The Lego Movie, Abraham Lincoln was among the Master Builders that meet at Cloud Cuckoo Land. Lincoln then rides his rocket armchair away from the dog. During the battle of Bricksburg, Lincoln is shown riding into battle while giving Michelangelo Buonaroti and William Shakespeare a ride.

In The Lego Movie Videogame, Lincoln is seen during the attack on Cloud Cuckoo Land where Emmet helps to fix his rocket armchair.

In a promo for the DVD release of The Lego Movie, Lincoln was paired up with Michelangelo Buonaroti in a buddy cop project called "Time Cops."

Abraham Lincoln makes an appearance in The Lego Movie 2: The Second Part, where he uses his rocket armchair to fight against the Duplo invasion.

==== Gandalf the Grey ====
Gandalf the Grey (voiced by Todd Hanson) is a wizard from Middle-earth who is one of the Master Builders.

In The Lego Movie, Gandalf is among the Master Builders who meet in Cloud Cuckoo Land. When Gandalf asks Vitruvius to have Emmet stand forward, Vitruvius mistakes him for Albus Dumbledore much to the annoyance of both wizards. When it was revealed that Emmet doesn't know any Master Builder skills, Gandalf scolds Emmet and calls him a "butt", something that Dumbledore agrees with, when Emmet says a sentence ending with "but". During the attack on Cloud Cuckoo Land, Gandalf is among the Master Builders that hear about the tracker on Emmet's leg and claims that he led the Super Secret Police right to them. He is among the Master Builders that are captured. Following the Kragle being capped by the Piece of Resistance, Gandalf and Albus Dumbledore toss the Deep Sea Diver up and down.

In The Lego Movie Videogame, Gandalf and the Magician help Emmet and Princess Unikitty fight Lord Business' giant robot.

In Lego Dimensions, Gandalf (who is from the Lego The Lord of the Rings universe) teams up with Wyldstyle and the "real" Batman to save the other dimensions from Lord Vortech.

Gandalf has a minor appearance in The Lego Movie 2: The Second Part in Emmet's dream. When Wyldstyle, Batman, MetalBeard, Unikitty, and Benny get abducted by General Sweet Mayhem, Gandalf states that it has become pointless to rescue them since the Justice League is still missing and the characters from Marvel Comics aren't answering the phone. He is later seen when Emmet's dream starts coming true whereas he shouts "IT'S ARMAMAGEDDON!".

==== Albus Dumbledore ====
Albus Dumbledore (voiced by Jordan Peele) is a wizard who is the headmaster of Hogwarts and a Master Builder.

In The Lego Movie, Dumbledore is among the Master Builders who meet in Cloud Cuckoo Land. When Gandalf asks Vitruvius to have Emmet stand forward, Vitruvius mistakes him for Albus Dumbledore much to the annoyance of both wizards. Also, Vitruvius thought that Professor Dumbledore's last name was pronounced "Dubbledore", annoying him even more. When it was revealed that Emmet doesn't know any Master Builder skills and he tried to make an attempt at a motivated speech, Gandalf and Dumbledore quote to Emmet that he's the but when he quoted "but". He is among the Master Builders that are captured. Following the Kragle being capped by the Piece of Resistance, Albus Dumbledore and Gandalf toss the Deep Sea Diver up and down.

==== Michelangelo Buonarroti ====
Michelangelo Buonarroti is an artist and sculptor that is one of the Master Builders.

In The Lego Movie, Michelangelo is among the Master Builders who meet in Cloud Cuckoo Land where he was seen working on a sculpture. During the fight in Bricksburg, Michelangelo and William Shakespeare are showing riding with Abraham Lincoln on his rocket chair.

==== William Shakespeare ====
William Shakespeare (voiced by Jorma Taccone) is a poet, playwright, and actor who is one of the Master Builders.

In The Lego Movie, William Shakespeare is among the Master Builders who meet in Cloud Cuckoo Land. When it was discovered that Emmet has not learned any Master Builder skills yet, Shakespeare considered him "rubbish". During the attack on Cloud Cuckoo Land, Shakespeare is among the Master Builders who are apprehended by the Super Secret Police. During the fight in Bricksburg, Shakespeare and Michelangelo Buonaroti are shown riding with Abraham Lincoln on his rocket chair.

==== Blaze Firefighter ====
Blaze Firefighter is a firefighter and Master Builder.

In The Lego Movie, Blaze is among the Master Builders who meet in Cloud Cuckoo Land. Blaze was later seen during the battle in Bricksburg where he is operating a mech that was created from a fire engine.

==== Cardio Carrie ====
Cardio Carrie is a fitness instructor and Master Builder.

In The Lego Movie she is among the Master Builders who meet in Cloud Cuckoo Land.

==== El Macho Wrestler ====
El Macho Wrestler is a masked wrestler and Master Builder.

In The Lego Movie, he is among the Master Builders who meet in Cloud Cuckoo Land.

==== Gallant Guards ====
The Gallant Guards are inhabitants of Middle Zealand where some of them are Master Builders, they are recycled from the Lion Knights from Lego Castle.

In The Lego Movie, the Gallant Guards that are Master Builders are among the Master Builders who meet in Cloud Cuckoo Land. Some other Gallant Guards were shown listening to a medieval messenger reading Wyldstyle's message to everyone to stand up to Lord Business' forces.

==== Gordon Zola ====
Gordon Zola is a chef from Bricksburg and a Master Builder.

Outside of his Bricksburg appearances in The Lego Movie, Gordon Zola is among the Master Builders who meet in Cloud Cuckoo Land. His name is a play on the word gorgonzola, a type of cheese.

==== Hank Haystack ====
Hank Haystack is a farmer and Master Builder.

In The Lego Movie, he is among the Master Builders who meet in Cloud Cuckoo Land.

==== Marsha: Queen of the Mermaids ====
Marsha is a mermaid queen and Master Builder.

In The Lego Movie, Marsha is among the Master Builders who meet in Cloud Cuckoo Land where Vitruvius referred to her as "Mermaid Lady". During the attack on Cloud Cuckoo Land, Marsha is the first person to notice the tracker that Bad Cop secretly placed on Emmet.

Marsha has a cameo in The Lego Movie 2: The Second Part fighting against the Duplo invasion.

==== Panda Guy ====
Panda Guy is a man in a giant panda suit who is a Master Builder.

In The Lego Movie, Panda Guy is among the Master Builders who meet in Cloud Cuckoo Land. During the battle in Bricksburg, he is seen helping a Yeti fight a Micro Manager.

Panda Guy also made an appearance in The Lego Ninjago Movie when Robin Roberts was announcing birthday dates.

Panda Guy makes a cameo appearance in The Lego Movie 2: The Second Part fighting against the Duplo Invasion.

==== Sir Stackabrick ====
Sir Stackabrick is a knight from Middle Zealand and a Master Builder.

In The Lego Movie, Sir Stackabrick is among the Master Builders who meet in Cloud Cuckoo Land. During the attack on Cloud Cuckoo Land, Sir Stackabrick is the one who identifies the tracker that Bad Cop secretly placed on Emmet.

==== Calvary Guard ====
A Calvary Guard is a Master Builder and is among the Master Builders who meet in Cloud Cuckoo Land.

==== Conductor Charlie ====
Conductor Charlie is a train conductor from Lego World City. In The Lego Movie, Conductor Charlie is among the Master Builders who meet in Cloud Cuckoo Land.

==== Ghost ====
The Ghost is a Master Builder who is based on the classic variant. In The Lego Movie, the Ghost is among the Master Builders who meet in Cloud Cuckoo Land.

==== Johnny Thunder ====
Johnny Thunder is an adventurer from Lego Adventurers. In The Lego Movie, he is among the Master Builders who meet in Cloud Cuckoo Land. When the Super Secret Police attack Cloud Cuckoo Land, Johnny Thunder gets trampled by the "Orb of Titleist" alongside the Island Warrior and a Yeti.

==== Lady Pirate ====
Lady Pirate is a female pirate from Lego Pirates. In The Lego Movie, she and a generic pirate are seen as part of Metalbeard's earlier attack on the Octan Tower. The Lady Pirate and the generic pirate are also revealed to be Metalbeard's parents in the "Ma and Pa" Emmet Awards contest.

==== Michelangelo ====
Michelangelo is a mutated ninja turtle from Teenage Mutant Ninja Turtles. He was seen three times in The Lego Movie. The first time was when he was part of Metalbeard's earlier attack on the Octan Tower. The second time was when he was among the Master Builders who meet in Cloud Cuckoo Land where he was seen in the same area as Michelangelo Buonarroti. And the third was when he was forced to come up with instructions for a stereo system for the TAKOS while trapped in the Think Tank.

==== Milhouse Van Houten ====
Milhouse Van Houten is a friend of Bart Simpson from The Simpsons, which was released by 20th Century Fox Television. In The Lego Movie, Milhouse was among the Master Builders who meet in Cloud Cuckoo Land.

==== Red Classic Spaceman ====
The Red Classic Spaceman is a 1980's spaceman in a red spacesuit from Lego Space. In The Lego Movie, one Red Classic Spaceman is among the Master Builders who meet in Cloud Cuckoo Land while another one is seen in a space set.

==== Speed Racer ====
Speed Racer is the famed race-car champion from Lego Speed Racer. In The Lego Movie, Speed Racer was seen as part of Metalbeard's earlier attack on the Octan Tower.

==== Swamp Creature ====
The Swamp Creature (voiced by Todd Hanson in The Lego Movie and The Lego Movie 2: The Second Part, Seth Green in The Lego Batman Movie) is a gill-man from Lego Monster Fighters. In The Lego Movie, the Swamp Creature is among the Master Builders who meet in Cloud Cuckoo Land. After Emmet's failed attempt at an inspirational speech, which causes the Master Builders to boo at him, the Swamp Creature asked "This is supposed to make us feel better?" In the second film, the Swamp Creature is seen when General Sweet Mayhem arrives in Apocalypseburg.

In The Lego Batman Movie, a different Swamp Creature is among the inmates of the Phantom Zone. When Joker describes himself to the inmates, the Swamp Creature called Joker boring.

==== Texas Cowboy ====
The Texas Cowboy is a Master Builder from the Old West. He is among the Master Builders who meet in Cloud Cuckoo Land.

==== Traffic Enforcer ====
The Traffic Enforcer is among the Master Builders who meet in Cloud Cuckoo Land.

==== Trucker Guy ====
The Trucker Guy is a Master Builder. He is first seen in a flashback when Wyldstyle talks about the Master Builders to Emmet. The Trucker Guy is later seen among the Master Builders who meet in Cloud Cuckoo Land.

==== White Classic Spaceman ====
The White Classic Spaceman is a 1980's spaceman in a white spacesuit from Lego Space. In The Lego Movie, one White Classic Spaceman is among the Master Builders who meet in Cloud Cuckoo Land while another one is seen in a space set.

==== Appearing from Lego Minifigures ====
The following Master Builders appear from the Lego Minifigures theme:

- Artist – The Artist is among the Master Builders who meet in Cloud Cuckoo Land. A different Artist appears in The Lego Ninjago Movie as a citizen of Ninjago City where he is among its civilians in awe over Meowthra before fleeing in terror.
- Caveman – The Caveman was depicted as a Master Builder in The Lego Movie Videogame.
- Circus Clown – The Circus Clown is among the Master Builders who meet in Cloud Cuckoo Land. During this time, he and the Lizard Man are shown painting Batman's face. In addition, the Circus Clown is shown to come from a Lego Universe location called Clown Town.
- Cyclops – The Cyclops appears in a stop-motion video created by fans on ReBrick.
- Deep Sea Diver – The Deep Sea Diver is among the Master Builders who meet in Cloud Cuckoo Land. Following the Kragle being capped by the Piece of Resistance, the Deep Sea Diver was shown being tossed up and down by Albus Dumbledore and Gandalf.
- Demolition Dummy – The Demolition Dummy is among the Master Builders who meet in Cloud Cuckoo Land.
- Disco Dude – The Disco Dude was seen as part of Metalbeard's earlier attack on the Octan Tower.
- Egyptian Queen (voiced by Emily Nordwind) – The Egyptian Queen is among the Master Builders who meet in Cloud Cuckoo Land. She was referred to by Vitruvius as "Cleopatra" in the part where she is shown trying to get an asp away from her. The Egyptian Queen is often shown in scenes with the Lady Robot. The Egyptian Queen appears in the second film.
- Forestman – The Forestman is among the Master Builders who meet in Cloud Cuckoo Land. He was referred to by Vitruvius as "Robin Hood".
- Gangster – The Gangster is among the Master Builders who meet in Cloud Cuckoo Land.
- Hazmat Guy – The Hazmat Guy is among the Master Builders who meet in Cloud Cuckoo Land. Unlike his Minifigure, he was sporting a yellow hazmat suit.
- Island Warrior – The Island Warrior is among the Master Builders who meet in Cloud Cuckoo Land. When the Super Secret Police attack Cloud Cuckoo Land, the Island Warrior gets trampled by the "Orb of Titleist" alongside Johnny Thunder and a Yeti.
- Lady Liberty – Lady Liberty is among the Master Builders who meet in Cloud Cuckoo Land.
- Lady Robot – A female robot who is the only robot so far that is a Master Builder. She is often shown in scenes with the Egyptian Queen.
- Lizard Man – A man in a lizard suit. He is among the Master Builders who meet in Cloud Cuckoo Land. During this time, he and the Circus Clown are shown painting Batman's face. In the second film, Lizard Man is seen dancing in Harmony Town.
- Magician – The Magician was seen as part of MetalBeard's earlier attack on the Octan Tower and later appeared among the Master Builders meeting in Cloud Cuckoo Land.
- Medusa (voiced by Lauren White) – Medusa was seen as part of MetalBeard's earlier attack on the Octan Tower. In The Lego Batman Movie, a different Medusa is seen among the inmates of the Phantom Zone.
- Mime – The Mime was seen as part of MetalBeard's earlier attack on the Octan Tower.
- Mummy – A Mummy is among the Master Builders who meet in Cloud Cuckoo Land.
- Pirate Captain – The Pirate Captain is seen in Wyldstyle's flashback where she explains about the Master Builders.
- Policeman – The Policeman is among the Master Builders who meet in Cloud Cuckoo Land.
- Punk Rocker – The Punk Rocker is among the Master Builders who meet in Cloud Cuckoo Land.
- Rapper – The Rapper was seen in Wyldstyle's flashback among the Master Builders in Bricksburg who are apprehended by the Super Secret Police.
- Ringmaster – The Ringmaster was seen as part of MetalBeard's earlier attack on the Octan Tower.
- Sleepyhead – The Sleepyhead is among the Master Builders who meet in Cloud Cuckoo Land. In The Lego Ninjago Movie, a Sleepyhead is among the citizens of Ninjago City that evacuate by boat.
- Surgeon – The Surgeon is among the Master Builders who meet in Cloud Cuckoo Land. This Surgeon is male opposed to the Minifigure that is female.
- Tribal Chief – While one Tribal Chief was among the Master Builders who meet in Cloud Cuckoo Land, another Tribal Chief was briefly seen in Flatbush Gulch's saloon in The Old West where he tried to hit Emmet with a hammer.
- Vampire – The Vampire was among the Master Builders who meet in Cloud Cuckoo Land and was referred to by Vitruvius as "Nice Vampire." He was incorrectly labeled as "Lord Vampyre" in The Lego Movie Videogame.
- Witch – The Witch was seen as part of MetalBeard's earlier attack on the Octan Tower.
- Yeti – The Yeti is among the Master Builders who meet in Cloud Cuckoo Land. When the Super Secret Police attack Cloud Cuckoo Land, the Yeti gets trampled by the "Orb of Titleist" alongside Johnny Thunder and the Island Warrior. During the battle in Bricksburg, the Yeti is seen helping the Panda Guy fight a Micro Manager.
- Zookeeper – The Zookeeper was seen in a flashback where Wyldstyle was talking about the Master Builders, being part of Metalbeard's earlier attack on the Octan Tower, and high fiving Speed Racer following the Kragle being disabled by the Piece of Resistance. In The Lego Ninjago Movie, a Zookeeper was among the Ninjago City citizens that are in awe of Meowthra before fleeing in terror.

=== Super Secret Police ===
The Super Secret police are Lord Business' personal law enforcement group. Under the leadership of Bad Cop, they are sent by Lord Business to hunt down the Master Builders.

==== Velma Staplebot ====
Velma Staplebot (voiced by Kelly Lafferty) is a robot who is Lord Business' overbearing personal assistant.

==== Sheriff Not-a-Robot ====
Sheriff Not-a-Robot (voiced by Jorma Taccone) is a robotic sheriff who is a member of the Super Secret Police and the head of its branch in The Old West.

==== Deputron ====
Deputron is a robotic deputy who is a member of the Super Secret Police's branch in The Old West.

==== Calamity Drone ====
Calamity Drone is a female robot who is a member of the Super Secret Police's branch in The Old West.

Her name is a parody of Calamity Jane.

==== Wiley Fusebot ====
Wiley Fusebot is a prospector-resembling robot who is the demolitions expert of the Super Secret Police's branch in The Old West.

==== Radio DJ Robot ====
The Radio DJ Robot is a robotic DJ who is used by Lord Business to play the song "Everything is Awesome" on the radio over and over again.

==== Foot Soldiers ====
The following are foot soldiers for the Super Secret Police:

- Micro Managers (both voiced by Doug Nicholas) are cube-shaped robots that are used to control the citizens and prepare them to be Kraglized. They appear different in the Lego sets with 11 variants of them while the game (which is accurate to the film with an extra eye to use as a laser) and Lego Dimensions created 3 different versions.
- Robo Crocodiles – The Robo Crocodiles are robotic crocodiles that are used by the Super Secret Police.
- Robo Feds (both voiced by David Burrows) are business suit-wearing office robots.
- Robo Pilots are the robotic pilots for the Super Secret Police.
- Robo SWATs (both voiced by David Burrows) are the common foot soldiers of the Super Secret Police. There were some Robo SWATs that were seen wearing hazmat suits.
- Skeletrons (both voiced by David Burrows) are robotic skeletons that are the personal minions and bodyguards of Lord Business.

=== Bricksburg citizens ===
Bricksburg is the city where Emmet is from. In The Lego Movie 2: The Second Part, Bricksburg has been renamed Apocalypseburg in its post-apocalyptic condition in the aftermath of the Duplo invasion. Bricksburg was later restored as Syspocalypstar when Finn and Bianca unite Bricksburg and the Systar System.

Besides Emmet, among the citizens of Bricksburg are:

- Blacktron Fan – Blacktron Fan is a Bricksburg inhabitant who is a fan of Blacktron.
- Bricksburg Construction Crew – The construction worker crew, which Emmet works for, that is tasked with eliminating old buildings and replacing them with new buildings.
  - Frank the Foreman (voiced by Keegan-Michael Key in The Lego Movie, Roger Craig Smith in Lego Dimensions) – The construction foreman of the construction crew.
  - Barry (voiced by Jake Johnson) – A construction worker.
  - Fred – A demolitions expert.
  - Gail (voiced by Melissa Sturm in The Lego Movie, Jessica DiCicco in The Lego Movie Videogame, Tara Strong in Lego Dimensions) – A female construction worker. A running gag is that she tends to forget who Emmet is.
  - Randy (voiced by Robbie Daymond in The Lego Movie Videogame) – A construction worker.
  - Wally (voiced by Dave Franco) – A construction worker. He resembles Rod Stanchion from LEGO City Undercover.
- Dr. McScrubs – A doctor who works in Bricksburg.
- Executive Ellen – An executive of a company in Bricksburg.
- Fabu-Fan – A woman who is a fan of Fabuland.
- Garbage Man Dan – A garbageman who lives in Bricksburg and works with Garbage Man Grant. His headpiece is a recycled version of an Elite Police Officer from Lego City Police.
- Garbage Man Grant – A garbageman who lives in Bricksburg and works with Garbage Man Dan.
- Ice Cream Jo – A female ice cream vendor.
- Ice Cream Mike – An ice cream vendor.
- Kebab Bob – A kebab vendor.
- Larry the Barista (voiced by Chris McKay) – A barista who sells overpriced coffee at his coffeehouse. He tells the Super Secret Police what he knows about Emmet while telling them the price of the coffee they purchased. During the battle in Bricksburg, Larry finds his creativity after Wyldstyle's speech and builds a machine out of his coffeehouse to attack the Micro Managers. He appears with an apocalyptic makeover in the second film where he states that they don't do decaf.
- Plumber Joe (voiced by Chris Romano) – Plumber Joe is a plumber that lives in Bricksburg.
- Alfie the Apprentice – Alfie is an apprentice plumber to Plumber Joe.
- Sherry Scratchen-Post (voiced by Charity James in Lego Dimensions, Mike Mitchell in The Lego Movie 2: The Second Part) – Mrs. Scratchen-Post is a cat lady who is one of Emmet's neighbors.
  - Sherry Scratchen-Post's Cats – A group of cats belonging to Mrs Scratchen-Post. The cats seen in the first movie are Jasmine, Dexter, Angie, Loki, Bad Leroy, Fluffy, Fluffy Junior, Fluffy Senior, and Jeff. In the second movie, some new cats are shown with Jeff that consist of Deathface, Scarfield, Metalscratch, Laserbeam, Fingernail, and Tox.
- Surfer Dave (voiced by Doug Nicholas in The Lego Movie and The Lego Movie 2: The Second Part) – A surfer based on the Surfer from Series 2 of Lego Minifigures. When he was interviewed by the Super Secret Police, he stated that he had no idea who Emmet is despite Emmet saying hi to him. He changed his name to "Chainsaw Dave" in the second film, referring to his chainsaw he uses to cut up his surfboards to use as firewood, never being able to surf again because of the drought in Appocalypseburg after the Duplo Invasion. In the event of Armamageddon, he changes his name to "Purgatory Dave" right before he descends into the Bin of Storage.
- Taco Tuesday Guy – A taco vendor who makes the tastiest tacos in Bricksburg.
- Sharkira – A female Apocalypseburg citizen who wears a black helmet with a shark mouth on the visor.
- Maddox – A male Apocalypseburg resident who holds a spear.
- Sewer Babies (voiced by Liam Knight) – A gang of Apocalypseburg babies who live in the sewers.
- Mo-Hawk – A female Apocalypseburg citizen.
- Fuse – An Apocalypseburg resident who wears a welder's mask and has a workshop.
- Roxxi – An aggressive-looking Apocalypseburg citizen.

=== The Old West citizens ===
The Old West is a location that is home to every cowboy and tribal natives minifigure.

It only makes a cameo in the second film, but it is reused in the video game adaptation of the first one and second one.

Among the citizens of The Old West are:

- Bandito – A Bandito is seen as a patron at Flatbush Gulch's saloon. His head is a recycled version of Dewey Cheatham from Lego Western.
- Cowboy Harry – A cowboy who is seen in his hot tub when Emmet and Wyldstyle first arrived in Flatbush Gulch.
- Odd Ollie – A bandit. He is referred to as "Bandit" in the handheld version of The Lego Movie Videogame.
- Prospector – An unnamed prospector. He asked Odd if he thinks zeppelins are bad investments.
- Rootbeer Belle – Rootbeer Belle is a worker at Flatbush Gulch's saloon. During Wyldstyle's speech, she and Sudds Backwash find the inspiration to create a battle craft out of parts of the saloon in order to fight the Micro Managers.
- Saloon Waitress – An unnamed waitress at Flatbush Gulch's saloon.
- Sudds Backwash – Sudds Backwash is a bartender at Flatbush Gulch's saloon. During Wyldstyle's speech, he and Rootbeer Belle find the inspiration to create a battle craft out of parts of the saloon in order to fight the Micro Managers.
- Tomahawk – A native warrior.
- Wild Will – An outlaw. He is referred to as "Outlaw" in the handheld version of The Lego Movie Videogame.

=== Larry the "Where Are My Pants?" Guy ===
Larry (voiced by Craig Berry) is an actor who stars in the Octan Corporation's TV series "Where Are My Pants?", which is the favorite show of Emmet and the citizens of Bricksburg. His character tends to misplace his pants with them ending up in odd places which leads to him asking his wife the titular question.

Larry's question in the TV series was referenced in the second film when "The Man Upstairs" asks his wife the titular question, revealing that these real life situations are the basis for the sit-com.

=== Sharon Shoehorn ===
Sharon Shoehorn is an actress who portrays the wife of Larry's character in "Where Are My Pants?"

=== The Duplo Aliens ===
The Duplo Aliens (voiced by Sawyer Jones, Liam Knight, Cora Miller, Graham Miller, Emmett Mitchell, and Ollie Mitchell) are a race of giant aliens made of Duplo blocks that come from the planet Duplo. As a result of "The Man Upstairs" allowing his younger daughter Bianca to play with him and Finn, the Duplo Aliens arrive with the lead Duplo Alien announcing their plans to destroy everyone before the film ends in a cliffhanger.

In the second film, the Duplo Aliens' attack turned Bricksburg into Apocalypseburg. However, it is also revealed in the second film is that they only wanted to join Bricksburg but had communication problems. In addition, their planet is located below the planet where Harmony Town is. In the second films sets and videogame, they are made out of Lego parts to resemble Duplo rather than the actual product.

=== Bianca ===
Bianca (portrayed by Brooklynn Prince) is the younger sister of Finn. She is invited to play with him and her father in the basement. As a result of Bianca being invited by her father to join, Bricksburg is invaded by aliens from the planet Duplo.

In the second film, Bianca is the one who created the Systar System which conflicts with Finn's Lego works. Their feud caused their mom to order them to put away the bricks, which brought "Armamageddon" to the Lego Universe. After Rex Dangervest was defeated, Finn and Bianca make up and made a compromise to combine Apocalypseburg and the Systar System, which pleases their mother.

=== Queen Watevra Wa'Nabi ===
Queen Watevra Wa'Nabi (voiced by Tiffany Haddish) is the shapeshifting alien queen of the Systar System, able to turn into multiple objects. Her name is a pun on the common phrase "whatever I wanna be", referencing her shapeshifting abilities.

Her apparent goal was to follow the Duplo Aliens' path in conquering the Lego Universe. Queen Watevra Wa-Nabi was thought to despise Master Builders like Business used to. However, it is eventually revealed that she intended to create peace between Bricksburg and the Systar System, but had poor communication skills which made the Master Builders think that she was evil and go against her. In addition, she develops a crush on Batman and plans to marry him. When General Sweet Mayhem brought Wyldstyle, Batman, MetalBeard, Unikitty, and Benny to her palace, Queen Wa'Nabi was first seen in horse form due to her just finishing a visit to the planet Anthropomorphia. It is revealed at the wedding that Wa'Nabi's original form was the heart that Emmet built for the Duplo Aliens in his attempt to create peace. In the real world, the heart was built by Finn and he gave it to Bianca, telling her "it can be whatever you want it to be". After hearing Emmet's speech, Finn rebuilds the heart for Bianca, thus reviving Wa'Nabi.

==== General Sweet Mayhem ====
General Sweet Mayhem (voiced by Stephanie Beatriz in the film, Carla Tassara in The Lego Movie 2 Videogame) is the general of the army of the Systar System in outer space who wears a helmet to disguise her voice and is loyal to Queen Watevra Wa'Nabi. She kidnaps Wyldstyle, Batman, Unikitty, Benny and MetalBeard, under Queen Wa'Nabi's orders. Emmet tries to save his friends by trying to convince Mayhem to take him instead, but she doesn't after her scanner shows that Emmet is still a non-special person despite all of his accomplishments near the end of the first film. Wyldstyle faces off against General Mayhem where her helmet gets removed. She did state to Wyldstyle about Queen Wa'Nabi's motives where Wyldstyle states that she has bad communication skills. When Apocalypseburg and the Systar System were merged after Armamageddon was thwarted, General Mayhem allows Benny to try on her helmet.

Without her helmet, she has pink skin with blue pigtail hair and has magenta and turquoise eyes.

Sweet Mayhem's design is based on the design of the mini-doll characters in girl-oriented Lego sets.

=== Rex Dangervest ===
Rex "Radical Emmet Xtreme" Macheteninjastar Dangervest (voiced by Chris Pratt in The Lego Movie 2: The Second Part, and J. P. Karliak in The Lego Movie 2 Videogame) is a space-traveling galaxy-defending archaeologist, cowboy and raptor-trainer who is the main antagonist of The Lego Movie 2: The Second Part. As his character implies, he is a spoof combination of Pratt's Peter Quill / Star-Lord, Owen Grady and Joshua Faraday roles from the Marvel Cinematic Universe, Jurassic World series and The Magnificent Seven (2016) respectively. His mention of being an "archaeologist" is based on rumours that Pratt could play a future Indiana Jones. A Master Breaker, Rex teaches Emmet how to be "tough" like him, and also "helps" Emmet save his friends, despite his warning to Emmet that almost nobody, not even a professional Master Builder, stands a chance against Wa'Nabi.

However, he is later revealed to be a nihilistic, alternative and embittered version of Emmet from the future who seeks to trigger the occurrence of Armamageddon, keeping him in existence, while locking the Lego and Duplo figures in eternal storage, as retribution for being left alone. After Armamageddon is thwarted and Rex's time machine is destroyed, Rex's future is rewritten as he fades away. He calls his fate "Back to the Future-ing" and shows redemption as he makes peace with his former enemies but states, "No regrets" except for not trademarking this same line.

==== Rex's Velociraptors ====
Rex gathers many Velociraptors from prehistory in his time-travelling ship. They are spoofs of Owen Grady's raptors from Jurassic World. Their names include:

- Ripley – A Velociraptor who is named after Ellen Ripley from the Alien franchise.
- Connor – A Velociraptor who is named after both Sarah and John Connor from Paramount Pictures's Terminator franchise.
- The Other One - A raptor presumably referring to the main raptor antagonist in Jurassic Park, which is called "The Big One".
- Quaid – A Velociraptor who is named after Douglas Quaid from Total Recall.
- Cobra - A raptor named after Lieutenant Marion Cobretti, whose codename is "Cobra", in the film of the same name.
- Rocky - A raptor named after Rocky Balboa, a boxer in the franchise of the same name.

When Emmet and Rex arrive in Harmony Town and the "Catchy Song" plays, the Velociraptors become affected by it. After Armamageddon is thwarted and Rex vanishes upon his future being rewritten, the Velociraptors are shown with Sherry Scratchen-Post and her cats emerging from the sewers.

=== Lex Luthor ===
Lex Luthor (voiced by Ike Barinholtz) is the archenemy of Superman, CEO of LexCorp and a Master Builder. He is seen being arrested by the Justice League and held in a cell on their ship. Lex Luthor is taken with the Justice League to fight the Duplo Invasion. After the Justice League is captured by Queen Watevra Wa'Nabi, Lex is also captured. He is seen working as Superman's butler on a planet in the Systar System.

=== Bruce Willis ===
A Lego caricature of Bruce Willis (voiced by himself) is encountered by Wyldstyle during her time in the Systar System. He is first seen in the Palace of Infinite Reflections having a drink while enjoying a spa.

Willis is later seen crawling around in air vents with a lighter in his hand where he encounters Wyldstyle. Emmet and Rex later encounter Willis in the same air vents which Wyldstyle hears through her headphones.

=== Systar System inhabitants ===
The Systar System is the galaxy-dimension in the Legoverse where Queen Watevra Wa'Nabi, General Sweet Mayhem and the Duplo Aliens live. It is named after "sister", particularly Finn's sister Bianca who created this Lego dimension from her creations in the real world.

There is a variety of obscure characters and creatures who call this place home. Besides Wa'Nabi and Mayhem, among the inhabitants of the Systar System are:

- Amber – Amber is one of the citizens of the Systar System who is the singer and dancer of the Pop-Up Party Bus under the stage name Melody.
- Archimedes – A brick-built cat who works at the spa in the Palace of Infinite Reflection on Planet Sparkle.
- Balthazar (voiced by Noel Fielding) – Balthazar is an attractive, sparkly-faced teenage vampire mini-doll who meditates the Systar System's visitors on the planet Sparkle. He is an expert on meditation, but is also a DJ in his spare time where he even plays the "Catchy Song." Balthazar is a nod to Edward Cullen from The Twilight Saga
- Banarnar (voiced by Ben Schwartz) – Banarnar is one of Queen Watevra Wa-Nabi's servants. As his name implies, he is a banana who at most times accidentally slips into an unintentional split, which results in getting teased by Queen Watevra Wa'Nabi. He loses his peel during Armamageddon. When Apocalypseburg and the Systar System were merged, Banarnar is shown getting a tattoo.
- Candy Rapper – A singer from the Systar System. She was featured in the LEGO Movie 2 minifigure series.
- Catherine Cat - An anthropomorphic cat from Fabuland who is part of Queen Wa'Nabi's council.
- Celeste – Celeste is a female vampire who works at the spa in the Palace of Infinite Reflection with Balthazar on Planet Sparkle.
- Chad (voiced by Chris Miller) – Chad is one of the citizens of the Systar System who is the DJ of the Pop-Up Party Bus under the stage name Tempo.
- Chocolate Bar (voiced by Chris Miller) – Chocolate Bar is one of the citizens of the Systar System who is obviously a talking chocolate bar.
- Dr. Dog - An anthropomorphic dog physician from Fabuland. He was present at the wedding of Batman and Queen Wa'Nabi.
- Eight (voiced by Mike Mitchell) – Eight is an octopus who does massages and works at the spa in the Palace of Infinite Reflection on Planet Sparkle.
- Fabuland Figure Bulldog 6 - An anthropomorphic bulldog. He was present at the wedding of Batman and Queen Wa'Nabi.
- Flaminga – A flamingo who works at the spa in the Palace of Infinite Reflection on the planet Sparkle and does massages.
- Ice Cream Cone (voiced by Richard Ayoade) – Ice Cream Cone is one of Queen Watevra Wa'Nabi servants who is obviously a talking ice cream. He serves as Queen Wa'Nabi's right-hand character. A running gag is that he tends to close out certain discussions between Batman and Queen Watevra Wa'Nabi so that they can focus on what comes next.
- Hearts (voiced by Sawyer Jones and Liam Knight) – They are adorable, pink hearts who are actually bombs that detonate when they say "HELLO!"
- Kitty Pop – A cat-themed singer from the Systar System (in a similar vein to Josie and the Pussycats). She was featured in the LEGO Movie 2 minifigure series.
- Plantimals (voiced by Chris Miller) – A race of plant-like creatures that live in the jungles near Harmony Town.
- Royal guards (voiced by Mike Mitchell – The royal guards work for Queen Watevra Wa'Nabi where they protect her and help secure vital information.
- Stars (voiced by Sawyer Jones, Liam Knight, and Cora Miller) – They are cute, little stars who are sometimes seen to be vomiting glitter. They are not accurate to the film in Lego sets such as there faces are not square pieces.
- Susan (voiced by Margot Rubin) – Susan is a mini-doll who is one of Queen Watevra Wa'Nabi's servants. When the main characters first encounter her, they mistake her for Queen Watevra Wa'Nabi who is actually the horse she is sitting on.
- Zebe (voiced by Jimmy O. Yang) – Zebe is a brick-built lavender and black zebra who is one of the citizens of the Systar System. He drives a party bus.
- Zen Bunny – Zen Bunny is a brick-built rabbit who teaches relaxation at the Palace of Infinite Reflection on Planet Sparkle.

==== Harmony Town inhabitants ====
Harmony Town is one of the locations in the Systar System and is located above Planet Duplo. Among its known inhabitants are:

- Chicken Suit Guy – A man dressed in a chicken suit that lives peacefully in Harmony Town with other minifigures and mini-dolls.
- Crayon Girl – A female dressed up as a purple crayon who inhabits Harmony Town. She was in the LEGO Movie 2 minifigures series.
- Fox Girl – A female dressed in a fox suit who lives in Harmony Town.
- Giraffe Man – Giraffe Man is a man dressed in a giraffe suit who lives in Harmony Town. In the LEGO Movie 2 minifigures series, Giraffe Man was featured.
- Hot Dog Man – A man who dresses in a hot dog suit.
- Hula Lula – A lady who lives in Harmony Town. She was featured in the LEGO Movie 2 minifigure series.
- Paper Boy (voiced by Chris Miller) – A paper boy who throws a newspaper that Emmet catches revealing Queen Watevra Wa'Nabi's upcoming matrimony.
- Watermelon Dude – A male dressed up as a watermelon who lives in Harmony Town. In the LEGO Movie 2 minifigures series, Watermelon Man was featured.

=== Dorothy Gale ===
Dorothy Gale is the main character of The Wizard of Oz. She and her Oz friends appear dancing to the song Catchy Song in Harmony Town.

She was also in The LEGO Movie 2 minifigure series.

=== Toto ===
Toto is a small, grey dog owned by Dorothy. He was in The LEGO Movie 2 minifigure series as an accessory for Dorothy.

=== Scarecrow ===
Scarecrow is a main character from The Wizard of Oz who dreams of having a brain. In the film, Emmet and Rex encounter him, Dorothy, Tin Man, and Cowardly Lion in Harmony Town.

He was in The LEGO Movie 2 minifigure series.

He was also a character in Lego Dimensions (not in his Lego Movie 2 version, but in his original version) who was kidnapped by Lord Vortech. Before being kidnapped he was mistaken by Batman for the DC Comics character of the same name.

=== Tin Man ===
Tin Man is a main character from The Wizard of Oz and somehow he found his way to Harmony Town. He is a wood-cutter made out of tin who rusts easily when exposed to water and he dreams of having a real heart. Tin Man also attended the wedding of Queen Watevra Wa'Nabi.

He was in The LEGO Movie 2 minifigure series.

=== Cowardly Lion ===
Cowardly Lion is a main character from The Wizard of Oz who alongside his friends end up in Harmony Town. He dreams to obtain courage. He was in The LEGO Movie 2 minifigure series.

=== Duplo Foreman ===
This Duplo alien controlled the building site where the DUPLO people where transporting bricks for the wedding.

=== Gary Payton ===
A Lego caricature of Gary Payton (voiced by himself) was seen in Apocalypseburg. Emmet tries to enlist Payton to help rescue his friends from General Sweet Mayhem to no avail.

=== Sheryl Swoopes ===
A Lego caricature of Sheryl Swoopes (voiced by herself) was seen in Apocalypseburg. Emmet tries to enlist Swoopes to help rescue his friends from General Sweet Mayhem to no avail.

=== Velma Dinkley ===
Velma Dinkley (voiced by Trisha Gum) is a character from Scooby-Doo. She is the brains of the team Mystery Incorporated. After his friends are taken by General Sweet Mayhem, Emmet tries to enlist Velma to help rescue them to no avail.

=== Larry Poppins ===
Larry Poppins (voiced by Jorma Taccone) is a male counterpart of Mary Poppins. He has a flowery hat and holds an umbrella. Larry believes that a spoonful of salt makes the medicine go down which is a spoof on Mary Poppins's famous song "A Spoonful of Sugar."

=== Marie Curie ===
A Lego caricature of Marie Curie was seen attending the wedding of Queen Watevra Wa'Nabi.

=== Ruth Bader Ginsburg ===
A Lego caricature of Ruth Bader Ginsburg was seen attending the wedding of Queen Watevra Wa'Nabi.

=== Benny's Space Squad ===
Benny's Space Squad is a squad of astronauts who are led by Benny. He thought he had lost them in the Bricksburg Invasion, but they were actually captured and taken to the Systar System.

- Jenny – Jenny is a white-suited astronaut who is a recruit of Benny's squad who was captured and imprisoned in the Systar System.
- Kenny – Kenny is a yellow-suited astronaut who is a recruit of Benny's squad who was captured and imprisoned in the Systar System.
- Lenny – Lenny is a pink-suited astronaut who is a recruit of Benny's squad who was captured and imprisoned in the Systar System.
- Denny — Denny is a red-Suited astronaut who is a recruit of Benny's squad who was captured and imprisoned in the Systar System. He was the only recruit not to appear in the set.

== Introduced in The Lego Movie: 4D – A New Adventure ==
=== Risky Business ===
Risky Business (voiced by Patton Oswalt) is the main antagonist of The Lego Movie: 4D – A New Adventure. He is Lord Business' older brother (as shown by his similar, yet grey, hairstyle) and he makes an unlicensed theme park called "Brick World".

His plan is to take The Lego Movie characters (except Batman and Vitruvius' ghost) to make his own show, hopefully succeeding where his little brother failed. Upon his defeat, Risky Business tries to get away, only to run into the police, where they arrest him for illegally making "Brick World".

==== Risky Business' Robots ====
Risky Business' Robots (voiced by David Burrows) are the robots created by Risky Business in The Lego Movie: 4D – A New Adventure. He entrusts them with giving out the hypnotic passes to Emmet, Wyldstyle, Benny, Unikitty, and MetalBeard.

=== Man of the Audience ===
Man of the Audience (voiced by Rob Schrab) is a person watching The Lego Movie: 4D – A New Adventure. After Unikitty, Benny, and MetalBeard get unhypnotized, Emmet confronts him on why he didn't help.

=== Police Man ===
Police Man (voiced by Adam Pava) is an unnamed police officer in The Lego Movie: 4D – A New Adventure who catches Risky Business and arrests him after he illegally makes "Brick World".

== Introduced in The Lego Batman Movie ==
=== Robin ===
Dick Grayson / Robin (voiced by Michael Cera in The Lego Batman Movie, Robbie Daymond in Lego Dimensions) is an optimistic and joyful kid who admires Batman. When he is accidentally adopted by Batman's alter ego Bruce Wayne and becomes his sidekick, he gets "double the happiness".

=== Batgirl ===
Barbara Gordon / Batgirl (voiced by Rosario Dawson in The Lego Batman Movie and Lego Dimensions) is the daughter of Commissioner Jim Gordon. She had cleaned up Gotham City's sister city of Blüdhaven by being both accurate and compassionate. When she becomes police commissioner following her father's retirement, she wants to make changes in Gotham City and teamwork with Batman.

=== Alfred ===
Alfred Pennyworth (voiced by Ralph Fiennes in The Lego Batman Movie, The Lego Movie 2: The Second Part and Lego Dimensions, and Robin Atkin Downes in The Lego Movie 2 Videogame) is Bruce Wayne / Batman's butler and wants to help him face his fear of a part of a family again.

Alfred also appears in The Lego Movie 2: The Second Part, helping Batman protect the citizens of Bricksburg as a Master Builder.

=== Batcomputer ===
The Batcomputer (voiced by Siri) is Batman's supercomputer that resides in the Batcave.

=== Gotham City citizens ===
Gotham City is a city where Batman lives and is the main setting of The Lego Batman Movie. The following are inhabitants of Gotham City:

==== Commissioner Gordon ====
Commissioner Jim Gordon (voiced by Héctor Elizondo) is the police commissioner of the Gotham City Police Department and the father of Barbara Gordon. During the events of The Lego Batman Movie, Gordon retires and is succeeded by his daughter Barbara.

==== Chief O'Hara ====
Chief O'Hara (voiced by Lauren White) is the police chief of the Gotham City Police Department. She is a gender-flipped version of Miles O'Hara from the 1966 series.

==== Mayor McCaskill ====
Mayor McCaskill (voiced by Mariah Carey) is the mayor of Gotham City.

==== Other Gotham City civilians ====
- Aaron Cash – A security guard at Arkham Asylum with a prosthetic hand who originates from the Arkham game series.
- Anchorman Phil (voiced by David Burrows) – An anchorman in Gotham City.
- Captain Dale (voiced by Todd Hanson) – The co-pilot of the airplane that Joker hijacks.
- Pilot Bill (voiced by Chris McKay) – The pilot of the airplane that Joker hijacks.
- Reporter Pippa (voiced by Laura Kightlinger) – A reporter.

=== Phyllis ===
Phyllis (voiced by Ellie Kemper in The Lego Batman Movie, Grey Griffin in Lego Dimensions) is the gatekeeper of the Phantom Zone who resembles a classic Lego brick. When someone is sent into the Phantom Zone, she will review their actions.

=== Justice League ===
The Justice League is a superhero group from DC Comics. They are seen at the 57th Annual Justice League Anniversary Party at the Fortress of Solitude which Batman was not invited to. There is no indication on if any of them are Master Builders or not. Besides Batman, Superman, Wonder Woman, Green Lantern, Flash and Aquaman, among the members of the Justice League are:

==== Apache Chief ====
Apache Chief is an Apache superhero who can grow in size.

==== Black Canary ====
Dinah Lance / Black Canary is a superhero with a "canary cry."

==== Black Vulcan ====
Black Vulcan is a superhero who can manipulate electricity.

==== Cyborg ====
Victor Stone / Cyborg (voiced by Arif S. Kinchen in The Lego Movie 2 Videogame) is a cyborg-themed superhero, a member of the Teen Titans and a member of the current Justice League lineup.

Cyborg makes a non-speaking appearance in The Lego Batman Movie dancing at the annual 57th Justice League party.

Cyborg also makes a cameo appearance in The Lego Movie 2: The Second Part going with the Justice League to fight off the Duplo Invasion.

==== El Dorado ====
El Dorado is a Hispanic superhero who has super-strength and also sports telepathy, teleportation, and the conjuration of illusions and physical inanimate objects.

==== Green Arrow ====
Oliver Queen / Green Arrow is an archery-themed superhero from Star City.

==== Hawkman ====
Carter Hall / Hawkman is a hawk-themed superhero from Midway City.

==== Hawkgirl ====
Shiera Hall / Hawkgirl is a hawk-themed superheroine from Midway City and the partner of Hawkman.

==== Martian Manhunter ====
J'onn J'onnz / Martian Manhunter is a shapeshifting Green Martian.

==== Samurai ====
Toshio Eto / Samurai is a Japanese superhero who can manipulate wind, turn invisible, manipulate fire, and cast illusions.

==== Wonder Dog ====
Wonder Dog is a dog that is associated with the Justice League. He was seen as the DJ at the 57th Annual Justice League Anniversary Party.

==== Wonder Twins ====
The Wonder Twins consist of Zan and Jayna, two twins from the planet Exxor who use their rings to turn into different things like Zan turning into any form of water and Jayna turning into an animal.

==== Gleek ====
Gleek is an Exxorian monkey and the pet of the Wonder Twins.

=== Batman Rogues' Gallery ===
There are different villains in Gotham City that Batman fights. Some of the villains are:

==== The Joker ====
The Joker (voiced by Zach Galifianakis in The Lego Batman Movie, André Sogliuzzo in Lego Dimensions) is the "Clown Prince of Crime". He wants to make Batman admit that he is his greatest enemy. His latest scheme to rule Gotham City was to team up with Batman's gallery of villains and threaten to bomb the nuclear power plant, which would sink Gotham into the Infinite Abyss of Nothingness. But as that plan was foiled by the Caped Crusader, he now wants to release the Phantom Zone's greatest criminals in the universe to take over the city.

==== Harley Quinn ====
Harleen Quinzel / Harley Quinn (voiced by Jenny Slate in The Lego Batman Movie, Margot Rubin in The Lego Movie 2: The Second Part, Tara Strong in Lego Dimensions) is Joker's partner in crime and girlfriend who will help him whenever he has a plan.

She appears in The Lego Movie 2: The Second Part where she is listed as a Master Builder. Her appearance is similar to the depiction of Harley Quinn that is seen in Suicide Squad. When Emmet is looking for help to rescue his friends from General Sweet Mayhem, Harley Quinn stated that any plans to rescue them from the aliens would be a "suicide mission."

==== The Penguin ====
Oswald Cobblepot / The Penguin (voiced by John Venzon) is a tuxedo-wearing supervillain that uses trick umbrellas and robotic penguins.

His sickly appearance, outfit (mainly the spotted tie and fluffy coat), sharp teeth and army of weaponized penguins are based on Danny DeVito's depiction of the character in Batman Returns.

==== The Riddler ====
Edward Nygma / The Riddler (voiced by Conan O'Brien in The Lego Batman Movie, Roger Craig Smith in Lego Dimensions) is a supervillain who is obsessed with riddles. He was one of the villains invading the Gotham Energy facility. While he was on the road, Riddler placed a giant question mark in front of an unsuspecting driver called Jeff. After Jeff stopped his car, Riddler tore his left arm off with his cane, leaving the car to be hit by a truck that Captain Boomerang and Two-Face had hijacked. He later invades Commissioner Gordon's retirement party with the other villains, but Joker has them all surrender to the police. Confused, Riddler asks "Riddle me this, what just happened?" He later breaks out of Arkham Asylum and teams up with Batman to save the city from the Phantom Zone inmates that Joker released and keep Gotham City from coming apart over the void.

==== Catwoman ====
Selina Kyle / Catwoman (voiced by Zoë Kravitz in The Lego Batman Movie, Grey Griffin in Lego Dimensions) is a cat-themed cat burglar.

==== Two-Face ====
Harvey Dent / Two-Face (voiced by Billy Dee Williams in The Lego Batman Movie, Imari Williams in Lego Dimensions) is a disfigured supervillain with a split personality who makes decisions by flipping a double-sided coin.

This version of Two-Face is based on Williams' depiction of the character from Batman.

==== Scarecrow ====
Jonathan Crane / Scarecrow (voiced by Jason Mantzoukas) is a scarecrow-themed supervillain who specializes in fear toxins. At the start of the attack on the Gotham Energy facility where Joker was placing a bomb there, Scarecrow breathed fear gas onto a gate guard while posing as a pizza deliveryman. He is defeated by Batman and escape alongside the others. In the following day, Scarecrow invades the city's winter gala party with the rest of Gotham's villains. He and the rest of them are apprehended by the police when Joker persuaded them to surrender. Later, along with the other city's villains, Scarecrow is recruited by Batman and his allies to work together to send back the escaped villains into the Phantom Zone and save Gotham City. Once Gotham is saved, Batman allows Scarecrow and the rest of his rogues gallery to escape.

==== Poison Ivy ====
Pamela Isley / Poison Ivy (voiced by Riki Lindhome) is a plant-themed supervillain that can control plants.

==== Mr. Freeze ====
Victor Fries / Mr. Freeze (voiced by David Burrows) is a freeze gun-wielding supervillain that wears a refrigerated suit that enables him to survive in temperatures about −50 degrees. In this film, he rides around in a 15 ft. exo-suit that has its own freeze gun.

==== Bane ====
Bane (voiced by Doug Benson) is a supervillain that gets stronger with a chemical called Venom.

His appearance and voice is based on Tom Hardy's depiction of the character in The Dark Knight Rises.

==== Killer Croc ====
Waylon Jones / Killer Croc (voiced by Matt Villa) is a mutated humanoid crocodile-themed supervillain.

==== Clayface ====
Basil Karlo / Clayface (voiced by Kate Micucci) is a gigantic shapeshifting supervillain with a pliable clay-like body which he can morph his limbs into weapons.

==== Additional Batman villains ====
The rest of the Batman villains listed here appear with minor roles.

- Calculator – A calculator-themed supervillain that can project hard light constructs from his keypad.
- Calendar Man – A calendar-themed supervillain who mostly commits crimes during holidays or significant dates.
- Captain Boomerang – A boomerang-wielding enemy of the Flash.
- Catman – Another cat-themed supervillain.
- Clock King – A clock-themed supervillain and enemy of Green Arrow.
- Condiment King – A supervillain with a condiment arsenal. This version is based on the Condiment King from Batman: The Animated Series.
- Crazy Quilt – A colorful supervillain who went insane from a procedure which makes him only see bright colors.
- Doctor Phosphorus – A supervillain surrounded by green flames that exposes his skeletal body.
- Egghead – A criminal mastermind with an egg-shaped head.
- Eraser – A pencil-themed supervillain that can rub out anything with his helmet.
- Gentleman Ghost – A ghostly gentleman supervillain and enemy of Hawkman.
- Hugo Strange – A mad scientist who obsesses over finding out Batman's identity through the use of hypnosis and his Monster Men.
- Kabuki Twins – Twin Japanese kabuki warriors who were originally created for The Batman.
- Killer Moth – A moth-themed supervillain.
- King Tut – A deluded pharaoh-themed supervillain who believes that he is the reincarnation of the famed ruler of Ancient Egypt.
- Kite Man – A kite-themed supervillain.
- Magpie – A female supervillain who is obsessed with shiny objects.
- Man-Bat – A mutated humanoid bat supervillain.
- March Harriet – A female supervillain who is patterned after the March Hare, she occasionally affiliates herself with the Mad Hatter.
- Mime – A mime-themed supervillain equipped with shock gloves.
- Mutant Leader – A villain from The Dark Knight Returns who is the leader of a gang called the Mutants.
- Orca (voiced by Laura Kightlinger) – A killer whale-themed supervillain.
- Polka-Dot Man – A polka dot-motive supervillain.
- Red Hood – A supervillain in a red-domed helmet.
- Tarantula – A female spider-themed supervillain and enemy of Nightwing.
- Zebra-Man – A striped villain in a mohawk with power over diamagnetism.
- Zodiac Master – A zodiac-themed villain who creates predictions for other criminals.

=== Phantom Zone Inmates ===
In the Lego universe, the Phantom Zone is used to imprison the most dangerous villains of the Lego universe with some of the DC Comics ones being the major ones. The Phantom Zone inmates that Joker allies with have been sorted in the cast list as "The Ubers." Besides a Swamp Creature and Medusa, among the known inmates are:

==== Agent Smith ====
Agent Smith (voiced by Christopher Corey Smith in Lego Dimensions) is a program turned virus from The Matrix franchise, he is accompanied by his horde of duplicates that he assimilated into his likeness.

==== Bruce ====
Bruce is the man-eating great white shark from Jaws.

==== Daleks ====
The Daleks are a race of robotic aliens from Doctor Who who are bent on exterimenting all life to become "the supreme beings" of the universe. Although they are depicted with the brilliant colours of the 2010 New Paradigm Daleks), their shapes seem to resemble those of the classic 1963 Daleks.

==== Dinosaurs ====
The Dinosaurs are prehistoric reptiles genetically cloned in the Jurassic Park movies, they mainly consist of a Tyrannosaurus rex and a pack of Velociraptors, but unlike in the original film have the ability to speak.

==== Evil Mummy ====
The Evil Mummy is a mummy from Lego Monster Fighters that is a servant of Lord Vampyre.

==== Gremlins ====
The Gremlins are a race of small scaly green creatures from the Gremlins franchise that create a path of mayhem and destruction, one of them is called Stripe (as recognized by his white mohawk) who acts as their pack leader.

==== King Kong ====
King Kong (voiced by Seth Green) is a giant gorilla that comes from Skull Island that has a habit of climbing tall buildings. During Joker's campaign to take over Gotham City, King Kong destroys one of the skyscrapers that Batman and the others hide in. King Kong is later defeated and sent back to the Phantom Zone.

==== The Kraken ====
The Kraken (vocal effects provided by Frank Welker in Lego Dimensions) is a giant sea monster from the Clash of the Titans franchise. During the attack on Gotham City, the Kraken tries to shoot down the Batwing and accidentally hits Sauron. The Kraken is equally shocked at what happened to Sauron like the other Phantom Zone villains and slips away stating "nothing to see here". The Kraken was later defeated by Mr. Freeze and Clayface and later sent back to the Phantom Zone.

==== Lord Vampyre ====
Lord Vampyre is a vampire from Lego Monster Fighters who wanted to eclipse the Sun forever to take over the world.

==== Lord Voldemort ====
Lord Voldemort (voiced by Eddie Izzard in The Lego Batman Movie, Liam O'Brien in Lego Dimensions) is an evil wizard who is the leader of the Death Eaters. He is among the Phantom Zone inhabitants that assists Joker in his attack on Gotham City. During the fight against Batman, Robin, Batgirl, Alfred Pennyworth, and Gotham City's native villains, Voldemort is defeated by Batgirl and Catwoman where he is the first villain sent back to the Phantom Zone.

==== Sauron ====
Sauron (voiced by Jemaine Clement) is a Dark Lord that comes from Middle-earth. In this film, he is depicted in his tower design. Sauron causes mayhem in the city by spreading lava and supports the takeover by being able to find anyone anywhere. He is accidentally destroyed by fire blast from the Kraken. The other villains are horrified by this and the Joker cries out Sauron's name in anguish as he mourns his dead friend. The Kraken who is equally shocked by what he did to Sauron and quietly slips away stating "nothing to see here."

==== Wicked Witch of the West ====
The Wicked Witch of the West (voiced by Riki Lindhome) is an evil witch from the Land of Oz, she is assisted by her army of bird-winged Flying Monkeys.

==== General Zod ====
General Zod is a Kryptonian from Krypton and an enemy of Superman. He was seen in archive footage on "Metropolis in Focus" being defeated by Superman and banished to the Phantom Zone. General Zod was not seen when Joker arrives in the Phantom Zone, but was seen with Joker and the Phantom Zone inmates surrounding Batman in Wayne Manor.

In The Lego Movie 2: The Second Part, it was mentioned by Aquaman that General Zod is in Harmony Town and had just made a leaf walk.

His appearance is based on Terence Stamp's portrayal of the character in Superman and Superman II.

==== Skeleton Warriors ====
The Skeleton Warriors are Skeletons from Jason and the Argonauts. Numerous Skeletons attacked the Batwing.

== Introduced in The Lego Ninjago Movie ==
=== Lloyd ===
Lloyd Garmadon / Green Ninja (voiced by Dave Franco) is the main character and protagonist of The Lego Ninjago Movie. He is the leader of the Secret Ninja Force who goes under the alias The Green Ninja. He is the son of Misako and the evil Lord Garmadon.

Lloyd Garmadon was previously seen in The Lego Movie among the Master Builders who meet in Cloud Cuckoo Land where Vitruvius referred to him as the Green Ninja.

=== Kai ===
Kai / Fire Ninja (voiced by Michael Peña) is the outgoing and enthusiastic Red Ninja of Fire. He is fiercely loyal to his fellow ninjas, particularly Lloyd and his sister Nya. His vehicle is a humanoid mech with flamethrower arms known as the Fire Mech.

=== Cole ===
Cole / Earth Ninja (voiced by Fred Armisen) is the music-loving Black Ninja of Earth. His vehicle is a mech supported by one wheel and armed with powerful weaponized speakers known as the Quake Mech.

=== Jay ===
Jay / Lightning Ninja (voiced by Kumail Nanjiani) is the nervous Blue Ninja of Lightning. He comes from a close family and tries to make Lloyd feel better as a result. Jay harbors a crush for Nya, but he is interrupted every time he gets the courage to tell her his feelings for her. His vehicle is an aerial vehicle known as the Lightning Jet.

=== Zane ===
Zane / Ice Ninja (voiced by Zach Woods) is an intelligent, logical and methodical android who is the White Ninja of Ice. His vehicle is a tank armed with a freeze ray known as the Ice Tank.

=== Nya ===
Nya / Water Ninja (voiced by Abbi Jacobson) is the strong-willed, confident and motivated Ninja of Water and Kai's sister. Her mech is a robotic spider-like mech known as the Water Strider. By the end of the film, Koko and Nya opened a school to teach former shark generals life skills.

=== Master Wu ===
Master Wu (voiced by Jackie Chan) is the wise-cracking master and mentor of the six ninjas. He hopes for them to rely less on their mechs and more on themselves and each other.

In The Master short film, Master Wu tries using his super sweet moves to throw red bricks on the wall to spell out "The Master", but he keeps being interrupted by a chicken.

=== Lord Garmadon ===
Lord Garmadon (voiced by Justin Theroux) is an evil warlord who is the father of Lloyd Garmadon and the brother of Master Wu. He leads an army of aquatic-themed villains known as the Shark Army. He is impatient, impulsive and self-absorbed.

=== Misako Garmadon ===
Misako "Koko" Garmadon / Lady Iron Dragon (voiced by Olivia Munn) is Lloyd's compassionate mother and Garmadon's ex-wife. She fell in love with Garmadon on a battlefield due to them both being somewhat warlords, and they eventually married. Though she eventually realized the she did not want her son to have a warlord's life. As a result, Misako left him and took Lloyd with in hopes of giving him a normal life. She is nicknamed Koko by Garmadon. By the end of the film, Koko and Nya opened a school to teach former shark generals life skills.

==== Shark Army ====
The Shark Army is an army of sea creature-themed soldiers that work for Lord Garmadon. Most of its members wear masks that are similar to sea creatures. Any general that disappoints Lord Garmadon or angers him literally gets fired and is ejected from his volcano lair by being shot out of the volcano and the next general will become the General No. 1. Among its members are:

- General Olivia (voiced by Ali Wong) – The fish-themed general of Garmadon's Shark Army. She was the successor of the original General No. 1. Due to the lack of progress of the Shark Army finding the Ninjas and Master Wu, Lord Garmadon fired her. General Olivia led the other fired generals in a plan to get revenge on Lord Garmadon. By the end of the film, Olivia and the other fired generals attend a school opened by Koko and Nya to learn life skills.
- General Omar (voiced by Todd Hansen) – The shark-themed general of Garmadon's Shark Army. He was among the generals who were fired by Lord Garmadon.
- General Jollty (voiced by Doug Nicholas) – The jellyfish-themed general of Garmadon's Shark Army. He is a version of Shark Army Jelly that wears a general outfit.
- General Bob – A shark-themed general of Garmadon's Shark Army who was among the generals that were fired by Lord Garmadon. After Lord Garmadon and Lloyd were captured by the fired generals, Lord Garmadon tried to order them to release them as Bob quotes "I can't hear you." Another fired general states that Bob literally can't hear because the result of him being shot out of Lord Garmadon's volcano disabled his eardrums.
- Private Puffer – A pufferfish-themed private of Garmadon's Shark Army in an orange pufferfish helmet.
- Crusher – A lobster-themed member of Garmadon's Shark Army.
- Crusty – A lobster-themed member of Garmadon's Shark Army.
- Great White – A great white shark-themed member of Garmadon's Shark Army.
- Hammer Head – A hammerhead shark-themed member of Garmadon's Shark Army. His Minifigure head is a reused version of Karlof's head.
- Puffer – A pufferfish-themed member of Garmadon's Shark Army in a gray jumpsuit/armor.
- Angler General – An anglerfish-themed general of Garmadon's Shark Army.
- Puffer General – A pufferfish-themed general of Garmadon's Shark Army.
- Narwhal Soldier – A narwhal-themed soldier of Garmadon's Shark Army.
- Shark Army Angler – The anglerfish-themed foot soldiers of Garmadon's Shark Army.
- Shark Army Gunner – The foot soldiers of Garmadon's Shark Army.
- Shark Army Jelly – The jellyfish-themed foot soldiers of Garmadon's Shark Army.
- Shark Army Octopus – The octopus-themed foot soldiers of Garmadon's Shark Army.
- Shark Army Thug – The foot soldiers of Garmadon's Shark Army.

==== IT Nerds ====
The IT Nerds were a group of people who designed Lord Garmadon's vehicles.

- Asimov (voiced by Vanara Taing) – Asimov had balding hair and wore a white jacket.
- Terri (voiced by Charlyne Yi) – Terri had a brown Afro and wore a Hawaiian shirt under her white jacket.
- GPL Tech – GPL Tech held a laptop and had a Batman top on. She was included in the LEGO Ninjago Movie minifigure series.

=== Fuchsia Ninja ===
Fuchsia Ninja (voiced by David Burrows) is a ninja who has the "element of surprise." When Lloyd asks why he can't be the one with the "element of surprise", Master Wu states that the Fuchsia Ninja has it as the Fuchsia Ninja suddenly appears and surprises them.

=== Chad the Cheerleader ===
Chad (voiced by Randall Park) is a male cheerleader at Ninjago High School. When he and some cheerleaders created a cheer titled "Boo Lloyd" because of his father's actions, Lloyd sarcastically replied that they have a No. 1 hit on their hands, but they take it seriously and soon sang it on the radio which later produced a remix. During the confrontation with Meowthra, Chad was among the Ninjago City civilians who saw Lloyd Garmadon unmask himself and were surprised at it.

=== Maggie the Cheerleader ===
Maggie (voiced by Retta) is a female cheerleader at Ninjago High School who is friends with Chad.

=== Mrs. Laudita ===
Mrs. Laudita (voiced by Laura Kightlinger) is a teacher at Ninjago High School. When Lord Garmadon attacks, the Ninjas had to be asked to have a bathroom pass so that they can secretly leave to fight Garmadon. She corrects the term "Can I have a bathroom pass?" with "May I" before telling them to go.

=== N-POP Girl ===
The N-POP Girl is a small child who lived in Ninjago City. She wore a pink, white and yellow dress which had Unikitty on and held a pink teddy bear.

=== Gong Guitar Rocker ===
The Gong Guitar Rocker is bearded man who plays guitar. He has a red T-shirt with a skull on it and lives in Ninjago City.

=== Sushi Chef ===
This Sushi Chef was seen at the end of the movie to be making sushi for Lloyd and Garmadon.

=== Mayor of Ninjago ===
The Mayor of Ninjago (voiced by Constance Wu) is the unnamed mayor of Ninjago City.

=== Snake Army ===
An army of humanoid snakes that appeared in Garmadon's flashback, originally they were going to reside in the Jungle of Lost Souls when Lloyd and Master Wu fight them across a bridge, they are inspired by the Serpentine from the original series.

=== Skeleton Army ===
An army of animated skeletons led by Garmadon that appeared in his flashback of how he met Koko, they are inspired by the Skulkin from the original series.

=== Michael Strahan ===
A Lego caricature of Michael Strahan (voiced by himself) is a known media personality and former member of the New York Giants. Strahan and Robin Roberts do reports on the heroic activities of the ninjas and Lord Garmadon's attacks on "Good Morning Ninjago."

In the UK version, he is replaced by a Lego caricature of Ben Shephard (voiced by himself).

=== Robin Roberts ===
A Lego caricature of Robin Roberts (voiced by herself) is a newscaster. In the UK version, Robert is replaced by a Lego caricature of Kate Garraway (voiced by herself).

=== Mr. Liu ===
Mr. Liu (portrayed by Jackie Chan) is a shopkeeper that appears in the film's live-action sequence. He tells a young boy about Ninjago. After the story has ended, Mr. Liu plans to train the boy in the art of the ninja.

=== Meowthra ===
Meowthra (portrayed by Pearl and Ruby) is a live-action cat. It was attracted to Ninjago when Lloyd Garmadon used the forbidden Ultimate Weapon (which is a laser pointer) where it starts causing havoc by destroying Ninjago to get to the laser. Garmadon later tries to control Meowthra with the Ultimate Ultimate Weapon (which consists of some trinkets), but Meowthra eats Garmadon instead. Lloyd later confronts Meowthra and tells Garmadon he forgives him and that he's sorry. Garmadon cries tears of fire, which causes Meowthra to spit him out. In the aftermath of the battle, Meowthra becomes the mascot of Ninjago.

== Introduced in Unikitty! ==
=== Puppycorn ===
Puppycorn (voiced by Grey Griffin) is Unikitty's younger brother, her best friend, and the rightful Prince of Unikingdom. Whereas she is shown to be a unicorn/cat hybrid, her brother is hybrid between a unicorn and a dog. Although he tends to be dim-witted, he usually means very well.

He makes a non-speaking cameo in The Lego Movie 2: The Second Part during Queen Watevra Wa-Nabi's "Not Evil" song sequence.

=== Hawkodile ===
Hawkodile (voiced by Roger Craig Smith) is a hawk/crocodile who is Unikitty's trusty bodyguard. Hawkodile also has a rival called Eagleator (voiced by Keith Ferguson), an eagle/alligator hybrid and his former best friend, who wants to beat him and take his shades after they were awarded to Hawkodile by their martial arts mentor instead of him.

=== Dr. Fox ===
Dr. Fox (voiced by Kate Micucci) is the residential scientist of the castle and Hawkodile's love interest.

=== Richard ===
Richard (voiced by Roger Craig Smith) is a 1x3 grey Lego Brick, who's Unikitty's royal adviser and the castle caretaker that speaks with a dull monotone voice.

=== Master Frown ===
Master Frown (voiced by Eric Bauza) is the main villain of the series and the nemesis of Unikitty who comes from Frown Town which is on the other side of the Unikingdom. He is one of the Doom Lords, a group of villains that spread pain and misery throughout the world. In the series finale, he betrays the Doom Lords after realizing they were never his friends and he, with Unikitty and the rest of the gang, form the Friendship Circle, which is a heart that turns into a beam that shoots Master Doom.

==== Brock ====
Brock (voiced by H. Michael Croner) is a close friend, roommate, and assistant to Master Frown. Brock would often hang around his apartment playing video games than help Master Frown with his plots. The only time he gets angry is when Master Frown neglects his part of the chores.

=== Doom Lords ===
The Doom Lords are a group of villainous individuals that Master Frown is a part of that make their lair in a tall building in Frown Town. They are the overarching antagonists of the series.

- Master Doom (voiced by Grey Griffin) – Master Doom is the leader of the Doom Lords. She has a tendency to chastise Master Frown for his various failures and appears menacing to the other Doom Lords. She seems to possess heterochromia.
- Master Papercuts – Master Papercuts is a member of the Doom Lords. He is the butt of the jokes and claims to do a better job than Master Frown.
- Master Malice – A member of the Doom Lords with large green horns.
- Master Hazard (voiced by Roger Craig Smith) – A member of the Doom Lords with a fiery head and bat-like wings. He once burned down the Candy Corn Kingdom.
- Master Misery (voiced by Tara Strong) – A member of the Doom Lords with an olive-green diamond-shaped face and dark blue hair obscuring the eyes.
- Master Fear (voiced by Eric Bauza) – A member of the Doom Lords with a light blue water drop-shaped face and hollow eye sockets.
- Master Pain (voiced by Grey Griffin) – A female member of the Doom Lords with a noh mask-like face.
- Master Plague – A member of the Doom Lords with a green bird-like head and large eyes.

=== Unikingdom inhabitants ===
The following characters are citizens of the Unikingdom:

- Alert Siren (voiced by Roger Craig Smith) – A siren attached to a pole that notifies the Unikingdom when danger is approaching.
- Beatsby – A boombox with tiny-rounded arms and legs. His toy counterpart has no arms and legs.
- Beau (voiced by Tara Strong) – A rectangular creature with short legs and armless hands.
- Bim-Bom Liebowitz (voiced by H. Michael Croner when speaking, Roger Craig Smith when coughing) – An anthropomorphic green garbage bag.
- Brennan Gerry – An ice cream cone who works as Unikingdom's residential ice cream vendor.
- Burger Person (voiced by Tara Strong) – A cheeseburger citizen of Unikingdom who dislikes being eaten.
- Buzz – A creature with a blue square head and a yellow rectangular body who moves around on a skateboard.
- Cloudbarry – A cloud citizen of the Unikingdom. He is spelled "Cloud Berry" in the toyline.
- Connected Citizens – A duo that consists of a lime slope with arms and a rectangle with legs.
- Craig (voiced by Tara Strong) – A female moose farmer that grows pizza and other foods on her farm.
- Crazy Chicken – A chicken crafted out of a single brick.
- Dainty (voiced by Grey Griffin) – A circular-headed citizen with rectangular arms.
- Diane – A circular creature with folding arms and a suction cup for legs.
- Dino Dude (voiced by Grey Griffin in 2017–2018, Eric Bauza in 2018) – An Australian-accented Tyrannosaurus with wheels instead of legs.
- Eagleator (voiced by Keith Ferguson) – Hawkodile's former best friend and arch rival.
- FeeBee (voiced by Grey Griffin) – A flower/bumblebee creature who runs "FeeBee's Flower Shop."
- Gizmo – A robotic creature with antennae, pincers for hands, and wheels for legs. He also has a yellow variant.
- Glandrea – A double-tiered citizen whose top part resembles a hill and boot-shaped feet.
- Hominid – A genderless alien that moves around in a UFO.
- Kickflip (voiced by Tara Strong in most episodes, Grey Griffin in "Little Prince Puppycorn") – A skateboard-riding square.
- Kite Trio – A trio of living kites.
  - Bee Kite (voiced by Grey Griffin) – A bumblebee kite.
  - Kate Kite (voiced by Tara Strong) – A female red kite with a necktie-like tail.
  - Octo Kite (voiced by Grey Griffin) – A purple octopus kite with four arms.
- Ladybug – An unnamed ladybug who Puppycorn tends to trip over.
- M'Ladybug (voiced by Tara Strong) – A ladybug with a purple shell.
- Old Timey Mustache Man (voiced by Eric Bauza) – A lime disc-headed gentleman with a handlebar mustache who resides in Unikingdom.
- Penny – A green creature in full gray-armor who works at the Unikingdom's Toy Zone.
- Q.T. (voiced by Tara Strong) – A pink oval-headed citizen of Unikingdom.
- Rascal (voiced by Kate Micucci) – An orange cylinder with rectangular arms.
  - Sebastian – Rascal's pet lizard.
- Really Old Edith (voiced by Grey Griffin) – A hunched over figure who is one of the oldest citizens of the Unikingdom.
- Rock Guy – A seemingly-inanimate rock that is Puppycorn's friend.
- Ryott (voiced by Roger Craig Smith) – A green square frog who screams instead of speaking.
- Score Creeper (voiced by Roger Craig Smith) – A hooded shadowy figure who traps Unikitty and her friends in various type of games.
- Slobodan (voiced by Tara Strong) – A cylinder-shaped citizen of Unikingdom with boot-shaped feet.
- Sssnake (voiced by H. Michael Croner) – A snake in a bowler hat made up of rectangles with a triangle-tipped tail.
- Squarebear – A brown bear with a rectangular body, slope-shaped ears, and rectangular feet. There is also a pink variant of Squarebear.
- Stellacopter – A purple creature with round hands that wears a fez that has a helicopter-like blade on it.
- Stocko (voiced by Kate Miccuci) – A teal rectangle with arms and a bowler hat.
- Ted Butter (voiced by Roger Craig Smith) – A duck-like citizen with a vertical rectangle head.
- Theodore (voiced by Roger Craig Smith) – A brown bear with a smooth voice, a square head, long arms, and short legs.
- Tigerlope – A tiger/antelope creature.
- Toaster and Toast (voiced by Roger Craig Smith and H. Michael Croner) – A duo that consists of a toaster and a toast with arms that rides in him. They are sometimes referred to as the "Toast Bros."
- Trevor – A cat-like creature with flower petals surrounding his head.

== See also ==
- The Lego Movie (Lego theme)
- The Lego Batman Movie (Lego theme)
- The Lego Ninjago Movie (Lego theme)
- Lego Unikitty!
- Lego Minifigures (theme)
- Lego Batman
- Lego Super Heroes
- Lego Ninjago
- Lego The Lord of the Rings
- Lego Harry Potter
