= The Lego Movie (franchise) =

American media franchise based on toys

- Logo to the first film
- Created by: Dan Lin; Phil Lord; Christopher Miller; Roy Lee
- Original work: The Lego Movie (2014)
- Owners: The Lego Group; Warner Bros. (2014–2019); Universal (2020–present)
- Years: 2014–present
- Based on: Lego Construction Toys

Films and television
- Films: Main series: The Lego Movie (2014); The Lego Movie 2: The Second Part (2019); Spin-offs: The Lego Batman Movie (2017); The Lego Ninjago Movie (2017)
- Short films: Batman's A True Artist (2014); Michelangelo and Lincoln: History Cops (2014); Enter the Ninjago (2014); The Master (2016); Dark Hoser (2017); Batman is Just Not That Into You (2017); Cooking with Alfred (2017); Movie Sound Effects: How Do They Do That? (2017); Shark E. Shark in "Which Way To The Ocean?" (2017); Zane's Stand Up Promo (2017); Emmet's Holiday Party (2018)
- Television series: Unikitty! (2017–2020)

Games
- Video games: The Lego Movie Videogame (2014); The Lego Batman Movie Game (2017); The Lego Ninjago Movie Video Game (2017); The Lego Movie 2 Videogame (2019)

Audio
- Soundtracks: The Lego Movie (Original Motion Picture Soundtrack) (2014); The Lego Batman Movie (Original Motion Picture Soundtrack) (2017); The Lego Ninjago Movie (Original Motion Picture Soundtrack) (2017); The Lego Movie 2: The Second Part (Original Motion Picture Soundtrack) (2019)

Miscellaneous
- Theme park attraction: The Lego Movie: 4D – A New Adventure

The Lego Movie is an American media franchise and shared universe based on Lego construction toys. It began with the 2014 film The Lego Movie, which was directed and written by Phil Lord and Christopher Miller. The success of the film led to the release of two licensed video games, a 4D film theme park attraction, two spin-off films titled The Lego Batman Movie and The Lego Ninjago Movie, which were released in 2017, Unikitty! an animated television series that also came out in the same year, and the sequel to the original film titled The Lego Movie 2: The Second Part released in 2019. All these films were produced by Warner Bros. Development would end in 2020, with Warner Bros. letting the rights lapse back to The Lego Group after The Lego Movie 2: The Second Part underperformed at the box office and the studio failed to materialize any new projects.

The franchise has received a generally positive critical reception, with the exception of The Lego Ninjago Movie which received mixed reviews, and has grossed $1 billion at the worldwide box office.

While Warner Bros. still owns the rights to the projects in their franchise, including the Unikitty! animated television series, Universal Pictures bought the rights to make separate films in a 5-year deal. The first separate Lego film under Universal's run of the film rights, Piece by Piece, was released on 11 October 2024, while five new Lego films under the new deal are in development.

== Films ==
All four films in the franchise were produced as a collaboration between Warner Animation Group, Lego System A/S, Rideback (formerly Lin Pictures), Lord Miller Productions, Vertigo Entertainment, and Animal Logic, who also provided the animation. All four films were distributed by Warner Bros. Pictures.

Film	U.S. release date	Director(s)	Screenwriters	Story by	Producers
Main series
The Lego Movie	7 February 2014	Phil Lord & Christopher Miller	Phil Lord & Christopher Miller	Phil Lord, Dan Hageman, Kevin Hageman & Christopher Miller	Dan Lin & Roy Lee
The Lego Movie 2: The Second Part	8 February 2019	Mike Mitchell	Phil Lord & Christopher Miller	Phil Lord, Matthew Fogel & Christopher Miller	Dan Lin, Roy Lee, Phil Lord, Jinko Gotoh & Christopher Miller
Spin-offs
The Lego Batman Movie	10 February 2017	Chris McKay	Jared Stern, Erik Sommers, Chris McKenna, John Whittington & Seth Grahame-Smith	Seth Grahame-Smith	Dan Lin, Roy Lee, Phil Lord & Christopher Miller
The Lego Ninjago Movie	22 September 2017	Bob Logan, Paul Fisher & Charlie Bean	Bob Logan, Tom Wheeler, Paul Fisher, Jared Stern, William Wheeler & John Whittington	Bob Logan, Dan Hageman, Tom Wheeler, Paul Fisher, Kevin Hageman, Hillary Winston & William Wheeler	Dan Lin, Roy Lee, Phil Lord, Chris McKay, Maryann Garger & Christopher Miller

Of note, RatPac-Dune Entertainment (currently Access Industries) only had involvement with the first three films; Village Roadshow Pictures only had involvement financing the first movie; and only two movies were released in IMAX, The Lego Batman Movie and The Lego Movie 2: The Second Part. The Lego Ninjago Movie was originally planned for an IMAX release, but these showings were cancelled.

=== Main series ===
==== The Lego Movie (2014) ====
The film was released theatrically on 7 February 2014, through Warner Bros. Pictures and Village Roadshow Pictures to near-unanimous acclaim; critics praised its visual style, humor, voice cast and heartwarming message. It earned more than $257 million in the U.S. and Canada and $210 million in other territories, for a worldwide total of over $469 million. The film won the BAFTA Award for Best Animated Film, the Critics' Choice Movie Award for Best Animated Feature, and the Saturn Award for Best Animated Film. It was also nominated for the Golden Globe Award for Best Animated Feature Film. The film also received an Academy Award nomination for Best Original Song for "Everything Is Awesome".

==== The Lego Movie 2: The Second Part (2019) ====
Before the critical acclaim and blockbuster success of The Lego Movie, talks for a sequel were already in motion. On 3 February 2014, Jared Stern and Michelle Morgan were tasked to write a screenplay. On 21 February 2014, the studio scheduled the sequel for a 26 May 2017, release. On 12 March 2014, Deadline reported that the first film's animation co-director Chris McKay would direct the sequel with Phil Lord and Christopher Miller as producers. Warner Bros. did not invite co-producer of the first film, Village Roadshow Pictures, to return as a participant in the sequel, due to Warner Bros. having now more confidence in the film and trying to keep as much profit as possible for itself. On 10 April 2014, McKay expressed that he would like to introduce more women in the sequel than men. On 28 July 2014, it was reported that on the internet, Chris Pratt expressed interest in reprising his role as Emmet for the sequel. It was also reported that Will Arnett might return as Batman, but had not decided yet.

In October 2014, Warner Bros. scheduled The Lego Batman Movie for 2017, and The Lego Movie 2 for 2018. By 25 October 2014, Lord and Miller had signed on to write The Lego Movie 2. The writers implied that the sequel would take place four years after the events of The Lego Movie. In February 2015, Warner Bros. announced that the title of the sequel had been changed to The Lego Movie Sequel, and that Rob Schrab, co-writer of Monster House replaced McKay as director since McKay went to direct The Lego Batman Movie. According to an interview at the Santa Barbara International Film Festival, the sequel would focus on Emmet and his sister, taking place in a "weird, dystopian version of Bricksburg." On 20 April 2015, Warner Bros. scheduled The Lego Movie Sequel for a 18 May 2018 release date. On 17 June 2016, the film's release was delayed until 8 February 2019. By July 2016, Raphael Bob-Waksberg had been hired to do rewrites of the script. By February 2017, Schrab had been replaced by Mike Mitchell, reportedly due to "creative differences". On 6 September 2017, it was announced that production of The Lego Movie Sequel would begin in Canada on 2 October 2017. It was also announced that Lord and Miller returned to re-rewrite the script to tackle gender issues on how a girl plays versus how a boy plays.

On 23 March 2018, it was confirmed that Tiffany Haddish was cast in the film as a new lead character while returning actors would be Pratt as Master Builder Emmet Brickowski, and addition to reprise the role of Emmet, Pratt would also voice the antagonist, Rex Dangervest. Elizabeth Banks reprises her role as Wyldstyle, and Arnett returns to reprise Batman, Channing Tatum as Superman & Jonah Hill as Green Lantern. On 21 May 2018, Warner Bros. officially renamed the film The Lego Movie 2: The Second Part along with releasing the first teaser poster.

=== Spin-off films ===
==== The Lego Batman Movie (2017) ====
In October 2014, Warner Bros. scheduled the release of The Lego Batman Movie, a spin-off starring Batman, for 2017, moving the release date for The Lego Movie 2 (later titled as The Lego Movie 2: The Second Part) to 2018. Will Arnett returned to voice Batman, with Chris McKay, who was earlier attached to the sequel, directing the film, the story written by Seth Grahame-Smith, and the film produced by Dan Lin, Roy Lee, Phil Lord and Christopher Miller. On 20 April 2015, Warner Bros. scheduled The Lego Batman Movie for a 10 February 2017 release. In July 2015, Arnett's Arrested Development co-star Michael Cera was cast to voice Robin. In August 2015, Zach Galifianakis entered final negotiations to voice the Joker. In October 2015, Rosario Dawson was cast to voice Barbara Gordon, the daughter of police commissioner James Gordon who later becomes the crime-fighting heroine Batgirl. The following month, Ralph Fiennes was cast as Alfred Pennyworth, Bruce Wayne's butler. Mariah Carey, although initial reports indicated she was playing Commissioner Gordon, was actually cast as Mayor McCaskill. The score was composed by Lorne Balfe. The first trailer for the film was released on 24 March 2016, followed by a second on 28 March the same year. The film was released in the United States on 10 February 2017.

==== The Lego Ninjago Movie (2017) ====
Brothers Dan and Kevin Hageman, who wrote Ninjago: Masters of Spinjitzu and co-wrote the story of The Lego Movie, co-wrote the film adaptation of Lego Ninjago, which features a new take that diverges from the TV series. Charlie Bean, who produced Disney's Tron: Uprising, directed the film, produced by The Lego Movie team of Dan Lin, Roy Lee, Phil Lord and Christopher Miller.^{[31]} The spin-off movie was scheduled to be released on 23 September 2016.^{[32]} On 20 April 2015, the film was delayed until 22 September 2017, as Storks took over the original release date of the movie.^{[12]} In June 2016, the cast was announced to include Jackie Chan, Dave Franco, Michael Peña, Abbi Jacobson, Kumail Nanjiani, Zach Woods and Fred Armisen respectively.

=== Universal Pictures deal ===
After any of the LEGO films that Warner had planned failed to enter development, along with the box office underperformance of The Lego Movie 2: The Second Part, Universal Pictures entered early negotiations in December 2019 to distribute upcoming feature film properties based on the Lego toys. Although Universal would develop and distribute future Lego films, the original The Lego Movie characters (Emmet, Wyldstyle, Unikitty, Benny, MetalBeard, etc.) and projects (The Lego Movie, The Lego Movie 2: The Second Part, The Lego Batman Movie, The Lego Ninjago Movie, and Unikitty!) are still owned by Warner Bros. In April 2020, the deal with Universal was set for a limited 5-year film deal. The company planned to include its own franchises and characters in its run of Lego films.

==== Piece by Piece ====
In late January 2024, Universal Pictures and Focus Features announced that a new LEGO movie called Piece by Piece, which focuses on the life of musician Pharrell Williams and was directed by Morgan Neville. It is produced by The Lego Group, Tremolo Productions, I Am Other, Pure Imagination Studios and Tongal, and was released on 11 October 2024.

==== Friends: Heartlake the Musical ====
In July 2025, Kenny Ortega was announced as an executive producer to a live action television musical based on the Lego Friends theme. Set for a 2026 release, the plot details a girl's magical transportation into Heartlake City after having constructed the Lego brick world. Ortega was later revealed to also be the special's director. Principal photography took place in August 2025 in London. The cast was revealed on October 7, 2026 and a trailer revealing the special's title released on October 9. It will release on YouTube and Peacock in the United States and internationally on Netflix and Tubi on October 16, 2026.

==== Untitled live-action/animated Lego film ====
On 5 August 2022, in a podcast interview with The Ankler, Dan Lin revealed that he would produce an upcoming Lego film that was in development, saying "We know we have to switch it up and take to a different art form that's still true to LEGO." Lin promised that the creative team had "reinvented" the Lego world for the film, but it did not yet have a release date. By July 2023, it was announced that it would be a live-action/animation hybrid similar to the films of The Lego Movie franchise, and that Aaron and Adam Nee were attached to direct the film. In June 2026, a new live-action/animated film was announced to star Keanu Reeves and be directed by Josh Cooley.

==== Various untitled live-action Lego films ====
On 31 October 2024, Universal Pictures announced the production of three new LEGO films, each directed by Jake Kasdan, Patty Jenkins, and Joe Cornish. Kasdan’s film was based on an original concept by Matt Mider and Kevin Burrows, featuring a script by Andrew Mogel and Jarrad Paul. Jenkins was working with Geoff Johns to write the screenplay of her film. Cornish, in turn, was revising a draft by Heather Anne Campbell based on a treatment by Simon Rich. These films were announced to be set in live-action.

==== Untitled live-action Lego Ninjago film ====
A new live-action film set in the Lego Ninjago theme was confirmed in October 2024, and was set to be written by Dan and Kevin Hageman, who were initially the head writers of the first nine seasons of the original Ninjago television series.

== Cancelled films ==
=== The Billion Brick Race ===
In March 2015, Warner Bros. announced that a third Lego Movie spin-off, titled The Billion Brick Race, was in development. By July 2016, Jason Segel and Drew Pearce signed onto the project as co-directors and co-writers. In August 2017, it was announced that Jorge R. Gutierrez was hired to replace them as its sole writer and director. At that time, the film was scheduled to be released on 24 May 2019.

By February 2018, Gutierrez had left the project declaring it a failure. In July 2018, the film's plot was announced by Pearce to be a Lego racing film, inspired by pre-existing racing films, including The Cannonball Run.

In December 2019, concept art of the film's main characters was revealed by the film's initial director Jorge R. Gutierrez, along with the confirmation that he had cancelled the project. The poor box office results of The Lego Ninjago Movie and The Lego Movie 2: The Second Part, along with the film's lengthy conceptual phase, were given as the primary reasons.

In July 2022, Gutierrez stated on Twitter that he intended for the film's two leads to be voiced by Diego Luna and Emma Stone. The film was also going to include elements of time travel as well as an appearance by the creator of Lego, Ole Kirk Kristiansen.

=== Lego Superfriends ===
In December 2018, Chris McKay confirmed that a sequel to The Lego Batman Movie was in development, with him returning to direct. The film was set for a release in 2022. However, while the rights of DC Comics are owned by Warner Bros., the sequel was cancelled due to Warner Bros. losing the Lego film rights after The Lego Movie 2: The Second Part underperformed at the box office, with Universal signing a deal as the distributor for future Lego films.

In June 2021, McKay revealed that the script was being written by Michael Waldron and Dan Harmon, and was stated to have taken notes from The Godfather Part II as well as Boogie Nights. The film would have focused on Batman's relationship with the Justice League, particularly Superman, and the main antagonists would have been Lex Luthor and OMAC. The film was tentatively titled Lego Superfriends.

== Television series ==
=== Unikitty! (2017–2020) ===
In May 2017, Warner Bros. and Lego announced that Unikitty, a character from The Lego Movie, would get a spin-off television series on Cartoon Network. For the show, she is voiced by Tara Strong. The premiere date was 1 January 2018 and the show's executive producers are Phil Lord, Christopher Miller, Dan Lin, Roy Lee, Jill Wilfert and Sam Register. Ed Skudder (creator of Dick Figures) and Lynn Wang (character designer on Star vs. the Forces of Evil) are signed as producers while Aaron Horvath serves as supervising producer. The series aired a Halloween special/sneak peek titled "Spoooooky Game" on 27 October 2017. The series aired a second sneak peek "Sparkle Matter Matters" on 17 November 2017, and a third and final sneak peek/Christmas special titled "No Day Like Snow Day" aired 1 December 2017. On 27 August 2020, the series concluded with a two-part finale titled "The Birthday to End All Birthdays".

== Short films ==
Short films set within the franchise were produced. Most of which were released on the home media releases of the films. In addition, various other shorts made to promote the films and unrelated real world events have been released on YouTube.

=== Batman's A True Artist (2014) ===
Batman's A True Artist is a stop-motion animated short film included on the home media release of The Lego Movie, it is presented as music video to Batman's song from that film. It was created by then-6-year-old Markus Jolly.

=== Michelangelo and Lincoln: History Cops (2014) ===
Michelangelo and Lincoln: History Cops is a stop-motion animated short film included on the home media release of The Lego Movie. It is presented as a trailer to a fictional action blockbuster starring the master builders, Michelangelo and Abraham Lincoln as they fight crime.

=== Enter the Ninjago (2014) ===
Enter the Ninjago is a short film included on the home media release of The Lego Movie. The president of Hollywood sits down with Emmet and changes up the plot of The Lego Movie to prominently feature ninjas for marketing purposes. They eventually decide to create a new ninja based film, titled "The super-crunchy ninja skateboard party movie with pratfalls slash physical comedy and cute furry animals for the international audience" which the short jokingly states became the biggest box-office bomb in the history of cinema. The whole film is a reference to Lego Ninjago.

=== The Master (2016) ===
The Master is a 2016 animated short film written and directed by Jon Saunders, co-written by Ross Evans, Carey Yost and Remington D. Donovan and produced by Ryan Halprin. Unlike the majority of the short films in the series, The Master was theatrically released with Storks on 23 September 2016, and early showings of The Lego Batman Movie in the United Kingdom. It stars Jackie Chan as Master Wu, Abbi Jacobson as The Chicken, and Justin Theroux as Narrator. The short follows Wu and an annoying chicken.

=== Dark Hoser (2017) ===
Dark Hoser is a short film included on the home media release of The Lego Batman Movie. Batman attends a tryout to apply to be a member of the Justice League of America, only to discover that he might be Canadian.

=== Batman is Just Not That Into You (2017) ===
Batman is Just Not That Into You is a short film included on the home media release of The Lego Batman Movie. Harley Quinn hosts a talk show and helps The Joker break up with Batman.

=== Cooking with Alfred (2017) ===
Cooking with Alfred is a short film included on the home media release of The Lego Batman Movie. Alfred hosts a cooking show with Batman and Robin as his guest stars.

=== Movie Sound Effects: How Do They Do That? (2017) ===
Movie Sound Effects: How Do They Do That? is a short film included on the home media release of The Lego Batman Movie. Bane, the Riddler, Poison Ivy and Catwoman are brought into a sound booth to help record sound effects for The Lego Batman Movie.

=== Shark E. Shark in "Which Way To The Ocean?" (2017) ===
Shark E. Shark in "Which Way To The Ocean?" is a short film included on the home media release of The Lego Ninjago Movie. The short follows a baby shark who tries to make its way back the ocean after getting shot out of Garmadon's Shark cannon. The short is animated in the style of the artwork seen in Lego instruction booklets.

=== Zane's Stand Up Promo (2017) ===
Zane's Stand Up Promo is a short film included on the home media release of The Lego Ninjago Movie. The short itself is a humorous promo for a Stand-up comedy DVD starring Zane.

=== Emmet's Holiday Party (2018) ===
On 10 December 2018, Warner Bros. released a Christmas-themed promotional short for The Lego Movie 2: The Second Part, titled Emmet's Holiday Party. In the short, Emmet and the citizens of Apocalypseburg throw a big Christmas Party to make everything awesome again despite the concern of attack from the Systar System from Lucy. Although originally released as an online short, it was eventually included as a bonus feature on The Lego Movie 2: The Second Part's home media release.

== Cancelled shorts ==
Two additional shorts for theatrical distribution were in production alongside The Master in 2016: Contagious directed by Patrick Osbourne, and Emmet Amuck directed by Jon Saunders and Ross Evans. Both ultimately went unreleased.

== Cast and characters ==
List indicators
List indicators

This section includes characters who will appear or have appeared in the franchise.

- An empty grey cell indicates the character was not in the film, or that the character's official presence has not yet been confirmed.
- ^{A} indicates an appearance through archival footage or audio.
- ^{U} indicates an uncredited appearance.
- ^{Y} indicates a younger version of the character.

Characters	Films				Short films				Attraction	Television series		
Characters	The Lego Movie	The Lego Batman Movie	The Lego Ninjago Movie	The Lego Movie 2: The Second Part	The Lego Movie short films	The Lego Batman Movie short films	The Lego Ninjago Movie short films	Emmet's Holiday Party	The Lego Movie: 4D – A New Adventure	Unikitty!		
Characters	The Lego Movie	The Lego Batman Movie	The Lego Ninjago Movie	The Lego Movie 2: The Second Part	The Lego Movie short films	The Lego Batman Movie short films	The Lego Ninjago Movie short films	Emmet's Holiday Party	The Lego Movie: 4D – A New Adventure	Season 1	Season 2	Season 3
=== Principal characters ===
Emmet Brickowski The Special	Chris Pratt	Archive footage		Chris Pratt	Chris Pratt			Chris Pratt	A.J. LoCascio			
Lucy "Wyldstyle"	Elizabeth Banks			Elizabeth Banks	Elizabeth Banks			Elizabeth Banks	Elizabeth Banks			
Bruce Wayne Batman	Will Arnett	Will Arnett		Will Arnett	Silent role	Will Arnett		Will Arnett		Will Arnett		
Bruce Wayne Batman	Will Arnett	Adam West^{A}		Will Arnett	Silent role	Will Arnett		Will Arnett		Will Arnett		
Princess Unikitty	Alison Brie		Silent cameo	Alison Brie	Silent cameo			Alison Brie	Alison Brie	Tara Strong	Tara Strong	Tara Strong
Princess Unikitty	Alison Brie		Silent cameo	Alison Brie	Silent cameo			Alison Brie	Alison Brie	Will Arnett	Tara Strong	Tara Strong
Ben "Benny"	Charlie Day			Charlie Day				Silent role	Charlie Day			
MetalBeard	Nick Offerman			Nick Offerman				Nick Offerman	Nick Offerman			
President Business / Lord Business	Will Ferrell			Will Ferrell								
Vitruvius	Morgan Freeman			Uncredited voice actor	Morgan Freeman^{A}							
Bad Cop / Good Cop	Liam Neeson			Uncredited voice actor								
The Joker		Zach Galifianakis			Silent role	Zach Galifianakis						
Richard "Dick" Grayson Robin		Michael Cera				Micheal Cera						
Barbara Gordon Batgirl		Rosario Dawson										
Alfred Pennyworth		Ralph Fiennes		Ralph Fiennes	Silent cameo	Ralph Fiennes		Ralph Fiennes				
Lloyd Garmadon Green Ninja	Silent cameo		Dave Franco		Uncredited voice actor		Silent cameo					
Lord Garmadon			Justin Theroux				Justin Theroux^{A}					
Master Wu			Jackie Chan				Jackie Chan					
Kai			Michael Peña				Michael Peña					
Zane			Zach Woods				Zach Woods					
Cole			Fred Armisen				Fred Armisen					
Jay			Kumail Nanjiani									
Nya			Abbi Jacobson									
Rex Dangervest Radical Emmet Xtreme				Chris Pratt								
Queen Watevra Wa'Nabi				Tiffany Haddish				Tiffany Haddish				
General Sweet Mayhem				Stephanie Beatriz				Stephanie Beatriz				
Risky Business									Patton Oswalt			
Prince Puppycorn				Silent cameo						Grey Griffin	Grey Griffin	Grey Griffin
Hawkodile										Roger Craig Smith	Roger Craig Smith	Roger Craig Smith
Dr. Fox										Kate Micucci	Kate Micucci	Kate Micucci
Richard "Rick"										Roger Craig Smith	Roger Craig Smith	Roger Craig Smith
Master Frown										Eric Bauza	Eric Bauza	Eric Bauza
Brock										H. Michael Croner	H. Michael Croner	H. Michael Croner
=== Master Builders ===
Superman	Channing Tatum	Channing Tatum		Channing Tatum		Channing Tatum						
Green Lantern	Jonah Hill	Jonah Hill		Jonah Hill		Jonah Hill		Silent cameo				
Wonder Woman	Cobie Smulders	Silent cameo		Cobie Smulders				Silent cameo				
Abraham Lincoln	Orville Forte			Orville Forte	Orville Forte							
Gandalf	Todd Hanson			Todd Hanson								
William Shakespeare	Jorma Taccone											
Shaquille O'Neal	Himself											
The Flash	Silent cameo	Adam DeVine		Silent cameo								
Aquaman	Silent cameo	Silent cameo		Jason Momoa								
=== Bricksburg citizens ===
Sherry Scratchen-Post	Uncredited voice actor			Mike Mitchell	Silent cameo					Uncredited voice actor		
Larry the Barista	Chris McKay			Chris McKay								
Surfer Dave	Doug Nicholas			Doug Nicholas				Silent cameo				
Ma Cop	Mellissa Sturm											
Pa Cop	Liam Neeson											
Barry	Jake Johnson											
Joe	Chris Romano											
Foreman Jim	Keegan-Michael Key											
Wally	Dave Franco											
Gail	Mellissa Sturm											
Blake	Craig Berry											
=== Humans and Animals ===
Finn	Jadon Sand			Jadon Sand								
Finn	Jadon Sand			Graham Miller^{Y}								
The Man Upstairs	Will Ferrell			Will Ferrell								
Mom	Amanda Farinos			Maya Rudolph								
Meowthra			Pearl and Ruby									
Mr. Liu			Jackie Chan									
Kid			Kaan Gulder									
Bianca				Brooklynn Prince								
=== Gotham City ===
Harley Quinn		Jenny Slate		Margot Rubin		Jenny Slate						
Commissioner James "Jim" Gordon		Héctor Elizondo										
Batcomputer		Siri				Siri						
Chief O'Hara		Lauren White										
Mayor McCaskill		Mariah Carey										Intro cameo
Pilot Bill		Chris McKay										
Captain Dale		Todd Hansen										
Anchorman Phil		David Burrows										
=== Phantom Zone ===
Phyllis		Ellie Kemper										
Voldemort		Eddie Izzard										
Sauron		Jemaine Clement										
King Kong		Seth Green										
Wicked Witch of the West		Riki Lindhome										
=== Rogues Gallery ===
The Riddler		Conan O'Brien				Conan O'Brien						
Scarecrow		Jason Mantzoukas										
Bane		Doug Benson				Doug Benson						
Two-Face		Billy Dee Williams				Billy Dee Williams						
Catwoman		Zoë Kravitz				Zoë Kravitz						
Clayface		Kate Micucci										
Poison Ivy		Riki Lindhome				Riki Lindhome						
Mr. Freeze		David Burrows				David Burrows^{A}						
Penguin		John Venzon				Silent cameo						
=== Ninjago citizens ===
Koko The Lady Iron Dragon			Olivia Munn									
Robin Roberts (Note: Replaced by Kate Garraway in the UK release.)			Herself									
Michael Strahan (Note: Replaced by Ben Shephard in the UK release.)			Himself									
Mayor			Constance Wu									
=== Garmadon's Army ===
General Oliva			Ali Wong									
Retirement General			Garrett Elkins									
General Omar			Todd Hanson									
General Jolly			Doug Nicholas									
=== Systar System ===
Duplo Aliens	Graham Miller											
Duplo Aliens	Graham Miller			Liam Knight								
Duplo Aliens	Graham Miller			Emmett Mitchell								
Duplo Aliens	Graham Miller			Sawyer Jones								
Duplo Aliens	Graham Miller			Cora Miller								
Ice Cream Cone				Richard Ayoade								Intro cameo
Banarnar				Ben Schwartz								Intro cameo
Balthazar				Noel Fielding								
Lex Luthor				Ike Barinholtz								
=== Other characters ===
Han Solo	Keith Ferguson											
Lando Calrissian	Billy Dee Williams											
C-3PO	Anthony Daniels											
Planty	Character is mute, inanimate object only			Character is mute, inanimate object only					Rob Schrab			
Bruce Willis				Himself								
Chicken							Abbi Jacobson					

== Additional crew and production details ==
Film	Composer	Editor(s)	Executive producer(s)	Co-producer(s)	Production Companies	Distributing Company	Running time
The Lego Movie	Mark Mothersbaugh	David Burrows; Chris McKay	Jill Wilfert; Matthew Ashton; Kathleen Fleming; Allison Abbate; Zareh Nalbandian; Jon Burton; Benjamin Melniker; Michael E. Uslan; Seanne Winslow; James Packer; Steven Mnuchin; Matt Skiena; Bruce Berman	John Powers Middleton	Warner Animation Group; Village Roadshow Pictures; RatPac-Dune Entertainment; Lego System A/S; Vertigo Entertainment; Lin Pictures; Animal Logic	Warner Bros. Pictures	1hr 41mins
The Lego Batman Movie	Lorne Balfe	David Burrows; Matt Villa; John Venzon	Jill Wilfert; Matthew Ashton; Will Allegra; Brad Lewis; Zareh Nalbandian; Steven Mnuchin	Amber Naismith; Ryan Halprin; John Powers Middleton; Jon Burton	Warner Animation Group; DC Entertainment; RatPac-Dune Entertainment; Lego System A/S; Lin Pictures; Lord Miller Productions; Vertigo Entertainment; Animal Logic	Warner Bros. Pictures	1hr 44mins
The Lego Ninjago Movie	Mark Mothersbaugh	David Burrows; Garret Elkins; Ryan Folsey; Julie Rogers; John Venzon	Jill Wilfert; Keith Malone; Simon Lucas; Chris Leahy; Seth Grahame-Smith; Zareh Nalbandian; Brett Ratner	Ryan Halprin; Samantha Nisenboim; Will Allegra; John Powers Middleton	Warner Animation Group; RatPac-Dune Entertainment; Lego System A/S; Lin Pictures; Lord Miller Productions; Vertigo Entertainment; Animal Logic	Warner Bros. Pictures	1hr 41mins
The Lego Movie 2: The Second Part	Mark Mothersbaugh	Clare Knight	Jill Wilfert; Keith Malone; Matthew Ashton; Chris McKay; Zareh Nalbandian; Ryan Halprin; Will Allegra; Chris Leahy	Sharon Taylor; Kristen Murtha	Warner Animation Group; Lego System A/S; Rideback; Lord Miller Productions; Vertigo Entertainment; Animal Logic	Warner Bros. Pictures	1hr 47mins

== Reception ==
=== Box office performance ===
Film	Release date	Box office revenue			Budget	Ref.
Film	Release date	North America	Other territories	Worldwide	Budget	Ref.
The Lego Movie	7 February 2014	$257,966,122	$210,300,000	$468,266,122	$60,000,000	
The Lego Batman Movie	10 February 2017	$175,936,671	$136,200,000	$312,136,671	$80,000,000	
The Lego Ninjago Movie	22 September 2017	$59,364,177	$63,800,000	$123,164,177	$70,000,000	
The Lego Movie 2: The Second Part	8 February 2019	$105,956,290	$93,646,912	$199,603,202	$99,000,000	
Total		$599,223,260	$503,946,912	$1,104,170,172	$309,000,000	

=== Critical and public response ===
Film	Critical		Public
Film	Rotten Tomatoes	Metacritic	CinemaScore
The Lego Movie	96% (258 reviews)	83 (43 reviews)	A
The Lego Batman Movie	89% (313 reviews)	75 (48 reviews)	A−
The Lego Ninjago Movie	56% (132 reviews)	55 (33 reviews)	B+
The Lego Movie 2: The Second Part	84% (300 reviews)	65 (52 reviews)	A−

=== Accolades ===
==== Academy Awards ====
Award	Main series		Spin-offs	
Award	The Lego Movie	The Lego Movie 2: The Second Part	The Lego Batman Movie	The Lego Ninjago Movie
Best Original Song	Nominated			

==== Golden Globe Awards ====
Award	Main series		Spin-offs	
Award	The Lego Movie	The Lego Movie 2: The Second Part	The Lego Batman Movie	The Lego Ninjago Movie
Best Animated Feature Film	Nominated			

==== BAFTA Awards ====
Award	Main series		Spin-offs	
Award	The Lego Movie	The Lego Movie 2: The Second Part	The Lego Batman Movie	The Lego Ninjago Movie
Animated Film	Won			

==== Critic's Choice Awards ====
Award	Main series		Spin-offs	
Award	The Lego Movie	The Lego Movie 2: The Second Part	The Lego Batman Movie	The Lego Ninjago Movie
Best Animated Feature	Won		Nominated	
Best Original Song	Nominated			

==== Annie Awards ====
Award	Main series		Spin-offs	
Award	The Lego Movie	The Lego Movie 2: The Second Part	The Lego Batman Movie	The Lego Ninjago Movie
Best Animated Film	Nominated			
Directing in an Animated Feature Production	Nominated		Nominated	
Writing in an Animated Feature Production	Won			
Editorial in an Animated Feature Production	Nominated		Nominated	
Production Design in an Animated Feature Production	Nominated			
Voice Acting in an Animated Feature Production			Nominated	

==== Kids' Choice Awards ====
Award	Main series		Spin-offs	
Award	The Lego Movie	The Lego Movie 2: The Second Part	The Lego Batman Movie	The Lego Ninjago Movie
Favorite Animated Movie	Nominated	Nominated	Nominated	
Favorite Movie Actor	Nominated			
Favorite Female Voice in an Animated Movie		Nominated		
Favorite Male Voice in an Animated Movie		Nominated		

==== Visual Effects Society Awards ====
Award	Main series		Spin-offs	
Award	The Lego Movie	The Lego Movie 2: The Second Part	The Lego Batman Movie	The Lego Ninjago Movie
Outstanding Visual Effects in an Animated Feature	Nominated	Nominated	Nominated	Nominated

==== Producers Guild of America ====
Award	Main series		Spin-offs	
Award	The Lego Movie	The Lego Movie 2: The Second Part	The Lego Batman Movie	The Lego Ninjago Movie
Producers Guild of America Award for Best Animated Motion Picture	Won		Nominated	

== Video games ==
=== The Lego Movie Videogame (2014) ===
The Lego Movie Videogame is the first video game in the franchise, and is loosely based on the 2014 film. The game was developed by TT Fusion, TT Games, and Feral Interactive (for macOS), and published by Warner Bros. Interactive Entertainment. It was released alongside the film in 2014 for PlayStation 4, Microsoft Windows, Nintendo 3DS, PlayStation 3, PlayStation Vita, Wii U, Xbox 360, and Xbox One, and on 16 October 2014 for Mac OS X by Feral Interactive.

Todd Hanson is the only actor to reprise his role from the film as Gandalf, but Chris Pratt, Will Ferrell, Elizabeth Banks, Will Arnett, Nick Offerman, Alison Brie, Charlie Day, Liam Neeson and Morgan Freeman were credited for their film voices. It features over 100 playable characters.

=== The Lego Batman Movie Game (2017) ===
Based on The Lego Batman Movie, Warner Bros. Interactive Entertainment released the endless-runner game coinciding with the release of the film. It was released for Android and iOS.

=== The Lego Ninjago Movie Video Game (2017) ===
Based on The Lego Ninjago Movie, it was released for Microsoft Windows, Nintendo Switch, PlayStation 4, and Xbox One, alongside the film, in North America on 22 September 2017, and worldwide on 20 October 2017. It serves as the second spin-off video game and the third game in The Lego Movie franchise.

=== The Lego Movie 2 Videogame (2019) ===
Based on The Lego Movie 2: The Second Part, the next videogame in the series was announced on 27 November 2018, and was released in North America on 26 February 2019, for the PlayStation 4, Xbox One, Nintendo Switch and Microsoft Windows; on 14 March 2019, it was released on macOS.

== Attractions ==
=== The Lego Movie: 4D – A New Adventure (2016) ===
On 16 December 2015, a promo video for a new 4D film at Legoland Florida based on The Lego Movie called The Lego Movie: 4D – A New Adventure was posted onto Lego's YouTube channel. The short subject premiered at Legoland Florida on 29 January 2016, before being rolled out to all other Legoland Parks and Legoland Discovery Centers later that year. It sees many of the original cast returning including Elizabeth Banks as Lucy "Wyldstyle", Nick Offerman as MetalBeard, Alison Brie as Princess Unikitty and Charlie Day as Benny while Emmet is voiced by A.J. LoCascio (due to Chris Pratt being unavailable at the time). The ride introduces a new character, Risky Business (voiced by Patton Oswalt), who is Lord Business' older brother.

== Merchandise ==
=== Lego sets ===
==== The Lego Movie sets ====
The first sets were released in the United States on 30 December 2013, and in the United Kingdom on 26 December that based on the film The Lego Movie with 14 sets being released. The largest of the sets is "MetalBeard's Sea Cow" which included 2741 pieces and five minifigures. In addition to the sets three polybag sets have been released as promotions are "The Piece of Resistance", "Micro Manager Battle" and "Super Secret Police Enforcer".

The second sets were released in the United States on 3 June 2014, and in the United Kingdom on 1 June with 6 sets being released. In addition to the sets three polybag sets have been released as promotions are "Pyjamas Emmet", "Radio DJ Robot" and "Western Emmet".

==== The Lego Batman Movie sets ====
The first sets were released in the United States on 2 January 2017, and in the United Kingdom on 1 January that based on the film The Lego Batman Movie with 13 sets being released. In addition to the sets 8 polybag sets have been released as promotions are "The Mini Batmobile", "Batman in the Phantom Zone", "The Joker Battle Training", "The Mini Batwing", "The Mini Ultimate Batmobile", "Disco Batman - Tears of Batman", "Batgirl" and "Bat Shooter".

The second sets were released in the United States on 2 June 2017, and in the United Kingdom on 1 June with 5 sets being released also included "The Ultimate Batmobile". In addition to the sets 2 polybag sets have been released as promotions are "Batman Battle Pod" and "Accessory pack".

The third sets were released in the United States on 1 January 2018, with 6 sets being released. The largest of the sets is "The Joker Manor" which included 3444 pieces and ten minifigures.

==== The Lego Ninjago Movie sets ====
The first sets were released in the United States on 1 August 2017, that based on the film The Lego Ninjago Movie with 15 sets being released. The largest of the sets is "NINJAGO City" which included 4867 pieces and 19 minifigures.

The second sets were released in the United States on 2 December 2017, with 5 sets being released. In addition to the sets 5 polybag sets have been released as promotions are "Quake Mech", "Ice Tank", "Green Ninja Mech Dragon", "Kendo Lloyd" and "Lloyd".

The third sets were released in the United States on 1 August 2018, with only one set called "NINJAGO City Docks" which included 3553 pieces and 14 minifigures. In addition to the sets 2 polybag sets have been released as promotions are "Movie Maker" and "Kai's Dojo Pod" also included 1 magazine gift called "Lloyd".

==== The Lego Movie 2: The Second Part sets ====
The first sets were released in the United States on 5 January 2019, and in the United Kingdom that based on the film The Lego Movie 2: The Second Part with 17 sets being released. The largest of the sets is "Rex's Rexplorer!" which included 1187 pieces and two minifigures. In addition to the sets five polybag sets have been released as promotions are "Emmet's 'Piece' Offering", "Rex's Plantimal Ambush", "Lucy vs. Alien Invader", "Mini Master-Building MetalBeard" and "Mini Master-Building Emmet".

The second sets were released in the United States on 22 April 2019, and in the United Kingdom on 1 May with 6 sets being released. The two largest sets are "The Rexcelsior!" and "Welcome to Apocalypseburg!". In addition to the sets two Magazine Gift sets have been released as promotions are "Emmet with Tools" and "Rex with Jetpack".

== In other media ==
=== Lego Dimensions (2015) ===
Lego Dimensions includes characters from various franchises, including The Lego Movie and The Lego Batman Movie. The game's Starter Pack includes Wyldstyle, while Emmet, Benny, Bad Cop, and Unikitty are included in Fun Packs. From The Lego Batman Movie, Robin and Batgirl are included in a Story Pack while Excalibur Batman is included in a Fun Pack.
