= The Lego Movie 2 Videogame =

2019 video game

- Developer: Traveller's Tales
- Publisher: Warner Bros. Interactive Entertainment
- Director: Jamie Eden
- Producer: Peter Lomax
- Designer: Arthur Parsons
- Programmer: Kevin Longair
- Artist: Richard Martin
- Composer: Simon Withenshaw
- Series: The Lego Movie
- Platforms: Nintendo Switch; PlayStation 4; Windows; Xbox One; MacOS
- Release: NA: February 26, 2019; EU: March 1, 2019; macOS: WW: March 14, 2019
- Genre: Action-adventure
- Modes: Single-player, multiplayer

The Lego Movie 2 Videogame is a 2019 Lego-themed action-adventure video game developed by Traveller's Tales and published by Warner Bros. Interactive Entertainment. Based on the 2019 film of the same name, it is a direct stand-alone sequel and the second installment to The Lego Movie Videogame, released on February 26, 2019, for the Nintendo Switch, PlayStation 4, Windows, and Xbox One; and on March 14, 2019, it was released for MacOS. It is the last Lego Movie videogame to be published by Warner Bros. Interactive Entertainment before Warner Bros. contract with The Lego Group expired in favor of a new one with Universal Pictures in 2020.

== Gameplay ==
The game borrows elements from Lego Worlds and has new additional characters and refined combat mechanics, as well as those from the first game. Worlds and characters from both films are featured in the game. Players create various structures in order to access new levels.

The first DLC expansion was titled the "Prophecy Pack," and brought prominent characters from the first movie into the game, such as Young Vitruvius and Lord Business. (Note: The pack was only available for pre-order, meaning it is no longer available for purchase.) Additionally, "Galactic Adventures" DLC expansion pack was made available on April 18, 2019, featuring three levels that expand further on certain plot moments from the film, such as Future Emmet's rise to becoming Rex Dangervest and Mayhem helping out the members of the Justice League along with helping the Queen with the ceremony.

== Development and release ==
It was officially announced on November 27, 2018, 9 months after the movie had officially premiered, that The Lego Movie Videogame would be getting a sequel, just like The Lego Movie. Upon its announcement, Sean William McEvoy, the vice president of digital applications and games at the Lego Group, emphasized the open-world aspect of the game.

The game was released worldwide on February 26, 2019, two weeks after the release of The Lego Movie 2: The Second Part, for the PlayStation 4, Xbox One, Nintendo Switch, and Microsoft Windows.

== Reception ==
Reception

Aggregate score
Aggregator	Score
Metacritic	NS: 56/100; PC: 56/100; PS4: 57/100; XONE: 65/100

Review scores
Publication	Score
Game Informer	6/10
Nintendo Life	7/10
Nintendo World Report	4/10
Push Square	6/10
Shacknews	7/10

On Metacritic, the Nintendo Switch version of The Lego Movie 2 Videogame has a score of 56 out of 100 points, based on 9 reviews, while the PlayStation 4 version received a score of 57 out of 100 points based on 23 reviews. Steam reviewers gave the game an average score of 7 out of 10.

Andrew Reiner of Game Informer gave the game a six out of ten, saying that "The Lego Movie 2 Videogame rarely pushes the player to do anything other than go into their building menu to select one object, and ends up being a shockingly bland experience in a series that has been mostly consistent in doing fun things with different properties." Similarly, Metro gave the game a 3 out 10, justifying their score by saying that the game was a "cheap and nasty film tie-in that reaches a new low for Lego games and stands in stark contrast to the creativity of the movie and the toys."

David Chapman for Common Sense Media gave the game a five out of five-star rating and commented, "If you've played Lego Worlds before, you'll instantly recognize the new elements in The Lego Movie 2 Videogame. Players use a scanner to add Lego pieces and structures to their inventory, using studs collected through gameplay to unlock scanned items for use. It can take a little extra time to learn how to use the new tools and to navigate the build system, but it's not too complicated and winds up being a lot of fun. Along the way, there are characters scattered around with requests for players to complete. These missions range from simple collection quests to huge boss battles. The story moves along with cinematic cutscenes as players travel through the Systar System to other worlds. What makes this interesting is how the creative freedom and story elements still manage to fit together to give kids the chance to relive the events of the movie and to have their own unique experience at the same time. Instead of simply watching the story unfold, The Lego Movie 2 Videogame lets kids tap into their imagination as a part of the story and feel like a true Master Builder in the process."

== See also ==
- Lego Dimensions
- The Lego Ninjago Movie Video Game
