= The Lego Movie Videogame =

2014 video game

- Developer: TT Fusion
- Publishers: Warner Bros. Interactive Entertainment; Feral Interactive (OS X)
- Director: Jon Burton
- Programmers: Phil Owen; Tom Matthews
- Artist: Paul Jones
- Composers: Mark Mothersbaugh; Mutato Muzika (Note: Superman (1978) music composed by John Williams, Wonder Woman (1975 TV series) composed by Charles Fox)
- Series: The Lego Movie
- Platforms: iOS; Windows; Nintendo 3DS; OS X; PlayStation 3; PlayStation 4; PlayStation Vita; Wii U; Xbox 360; Xbox One; Android
- Release: 7 February 2014: NA: 7 February 2014; EU: 14 February 2014; AU: 3 April 2014; JP: 6 November 2014 OS X; WW: 16 October 2014 iOS; WW: 22 January 2015; EU: 24 February 2015 Android; NA: 3 May 2016
- Genre: Action-adventure
- Modes: Single-player, multiplayer

The Lego Movie Videogame is a 2014 Lego-themed action-adventure video game developed by TT Fusion. It is a tie-in with the computer-animated film The Lego Movie, it follows the plot of the film and features its characters and settings.

The game was published by Warner Bros. Interactive Entertainment and released alongside the film in 2014 for Windows, Nintendo 3DS, PlayStation 3, PlayStation 4, PlayStation Vita, Wii U, Xbox 360, and Xbox One and on 16 October 2014 for Mac OS X by Feral Interactive. It was also ported to Apple's App Store on 22 January 2015, and to Google Play on 3 May 2016.

== Gameplay ==
Continuing the trend of gameplay from previous Lego video games by TT Games, the game puts players in control of various characters from The Lego Movie, utilizing Lego pieces to make their way through several open levels, along with footage from the film used as cutscenes. For the first time in the series, all of the environments, excluding the bonus area, are made entirely out of Lego pieces.

The game introduces two main new character types: Regular Builders and Master Builders. Regular Builders are unable to construct objects out of piles of Lego pieces and instead require instruction pages that are found throughout each level for the construction worker characters to use. Using these, players follow the instructions to build objects with specific pieces like real-life Lego sets. Master Builders, on the other hand, have the ability to grab Lego pieces from the environment and use them to create something new.

Other abilities include using switches as Lord Business, fixing machinery, hacking into computers, destroying gold bricks with lasers, destroying silver bricks with rockets or dynamite, starting fires, and putting out fires.

=== Downloadable content ===
An add-on named the 'Wild West Pack' was released for the game. It included four new characters—Old Ollie, Wild Will, Sudds Backwash and Rootbeer Belle—as well as four new pants: the tornado pants, the prospector pants, the hot pants and the jack rabbit pants.

== Reception ==
Reception

Aggregate score
Aggregator	Score
Metacritic	PC: 68/100; PS3: 80/100; PS4: 71/100; WIIU: 68/100; X360: 69/100; XONE: 69/100 iOS: 78/100

Review scores
Publication	Score
Destructoid	7.5/10
Electronic Gaming Monthly	8.5/10
Game Informer	8/10
GameRevolution	3.5/5
GameSpot	7/10
GamesRadar+	4/5
IGN	6.5/10
VideoGamer.com	6/10
TouchArcade	iOS: 3/5
Oyungezer	7/10

The Lego Movie Videogame received positive reviews from critics. Aggregating review website Metacritic gave the PlayStation 4 version 71/100, the Xbox One version 69/100, and the Xbox 360 version 69/100.

Andrew Hayward of IGN gave the game a 6.5 out of 10, calling it "Okay". He said that some aspects of the game were "boring", and that the game's "diverse backdrops and heroes devolve into tedium and busywork." Game Informer's Andrew Reiner gave the game a positive score of 8 out of 10 in his review. He called it a "visual marvel" while praising the graphics, characters, and soundtrack.

In his generally average review for Destructoid, Ian Bonds scored the game a 7.5 out of 10, stating "The Lego Movie Videogame does a decent job telling the movie's story and being its own licensed tie-in game – to its own licensed tie-in movie. Thankfully, both are fun in their own right."

Giancarlo Saldana of GamesRadar awarded the game a 4/5, writing "The Lego Movie Videogame is one of the better movie tie-in games out there, and it may even get you to see the film if you haven't already. Its action-packed stages will keep you on your toes, and all those cheeky quips from its characters are guaranteed to put a smile on your face. It may not bring anything new to the table, but The Lego Movie Videogame takes some of the best elements from the series and delivers it all in a charming package anyone will want to play with." Saldana had minor criticisms of the game; he disliked the smaller amount of content (compared to other Lego games) and said glitches can ruin the fun.

Christopher Bratt of VideoGamer.com scored the game a 6/10, mostly praising the mix of humour, locations, and characters. Bratt's main criticisms were concerning the game's familiarity, saying: "The Lego Movie's main problem is its origin. Whereas past movie tie-ins have gleefully poked fun at their source material, adapting Hogwarts, Middle-Earth, or Gotham (among others) to fit the Lego universe, this game isn't given that opportunity, and is poorer for it. Using clips from the film during cutscenes and rarely making its own gags, I'm reminded that I don't play the Lego games for their simplistic gameplay, which predictably hasn't changed here. Instead, I play them to see other, famous worlds reimagined with that Lego magic. There's nothing wrong with The Lego Movie Videogame, but it just doesn't have the same appeal as other entries in the series."

Jason Venter of GameSpot gave the game a positive review; Venter scored the game a 7 out of 10 and stated: "The Lego Movie Videogame is a faithful take on its source material, with just enough of the film's content missing to make it worth getting out to the theater, but not so much that the game's narrative becomes difficult to follow. The added interaction is also welcome and is handled in a manner that keeps the experience approachable and generally refined, even if it isn't always as creative and varied as you might hope. While not everything is awesome, The Lego Movie Videogame should be just the ticket if you're ready to spend another 10 to 12 hours in the fantastic world of animated plastic blocks."

Blake Peterson from Game Revolution scored the game a 3.5 out of 5. He cited the "great" comedy, "high" replay value, and "fun" mini-games as positives, but criticized the presence of technical issues, disliked the platforming gameplay sections, and felt that the game should have looked better graphically. Peterson thought the first half of the game featured "strong" gameplay, but felt the second half's gameplay was "weak". Peterson also praised the game for capturing the feel of the movie.

Marc Camron of Electronic Gaming Monthly gave the game a positive score of 8.5 out of 10 in his review. Camron stated: "Another smash-and-collect game featuring everyone's favorite building toy. This time around, it's based on the new animated movie and offers many of the hilarious characters fresh off the screen. A little bit of fresh gameplay livens up this entry, but a few story and camera problems hamper the experience somewhat. Ultimately, The Lego Movie Videogame is great fun and perfect for fans of the fantastic plastic."

Chad Sapieha, writing for Common Sense Media, gave the game a five out of five star rating and commented, "whereas most Lego games provide environments filled with objects only some of which are clearly made of plastic bricks, every object in The Lego Movie Videogame is visibly constructed of recognizable Lego elements. With the right bricks, kids can build everything they see in the game, which makes it feel more like they're exploring a living toy world than ever before. If your kids (or you) dig Danish building blocks, this one's a no-brainer."

== Sequel ==
On 27 November 2018, a sequel to the game, The Lego Movie 2 Videogame, based on The Lego Movie 2: The Second Part, was announced. It was released on 26 February 2019 for the PlayStation 4, Xbox One, Microsoft Windows, and Nintendo Switch. On 14 March, it was also released on macOS.

== See also ==
- The Lego Ninjago Movie Video Game
- Lego Dimensions
