= The Lego Batman Movie (soundtrack) =

The Lego Batman Movie (Original Motion Picture Soundtrack)

Soundtrack album by Lorne Balfe
- Released: February 3, 2017
- Recorded: 2016–2017
- Venue: Trackdown Studios (Sydney)
- Genre: Electronic; indie pop; dance rock; orchestral music
- Length: 1:34:17
- Label: WaterTower Music
- Producer: Lorne Balfe; Chad Smith

Lorne Balfe chronology
Skylanders Imaginators (2016)	The Lego Batman Movie (2017)	Ghost in the Shell (2017)

The Lego Batman Movie (Original Motion Picture Soundtrack) is the soundtrack to the 2017 animated film The Lego Batman Movie, the second installment in The Lego Movie franchise. The film is based on the DC Comics superhero Batman and other primary characters from the DC Universe and the Lego DC Super Heroes' Batman toy line. It is the only film in the franchise not scored by Mark Mothersbaugh, instead being scored by Lorne Balfe. The soundtrack to the film was released by WaterTower Music, through two-disc CD formats and for digital download, on February 3, 2017, a week prior to the film's release. A vinyl edition of the soundtrack was released on May 19, 2017.

One song on the soundtrack, titled "Let's Go" and performed by the band Kis-My-Ft2, is exclusive to the Japanese release.

== Background ==
Lorne Balfe was hired to score the film in June 2016. He previously assisted Hans Zimmer on the music of The Dark Knight trilogy, which is also based on the DC Comics character Batman. The film's director Chris McKay described the film as "About a Boy meets director Michael Bay." While working on the score Balfe did not think the film as a Batman film, but a "live-action film with Lego characters", and took the approach of a serious film, rather than writing "typical animated film music". Balfe did not use any musical references from previous Batman films, but instead he used Neal Hefti's original theme from the 1960s television series, as he thought "it would be great to hear in the film".

The first of the few themes he had written for the film, is the theme for Robin, who plays a pivotal role, as, according to Balfe, "a principal leitmotif or theme was not featured for the character". He had written a song "I Found You" for the character. Balfe used a different approach for the music for other characters, including Joker, where "he has a traveling band with him, the same way in which Henry VIII would have a lute player following him around…" The theme for Joker incorporates sitars, harpsichords and rock guitar. Red Hot Chili Peppers band's principal drummer Chad Smith, played drums for the score. Speaking about Smith's inclusion Balfe had said "it brought a whole different dimension to the score [...] It's not banging drums; it's the attitude behind playing them. And he brought the whole opening sequence alive."

For us, music was more about a journey on this one, from that "Who's The Batman" style to, ultimately, Michael Jackson and finally "Friends Are Family," which to me is just… I wanted the movie to end with joy. Like, really go over the top and move the needle from Batman's point of view at the beginning to Robin's POV by the end.

— McKay on the soundtrack to The Lego Batman Movie.

Chris McKay initially planned The Lego Batman Movie as a musical film. Speaking to Entertainment Weekly, he said that "I think if we had more time, there would have been a version of this movie that would have been a full musical and had more point of view songs like that for sure. But really, we just wanted people to leave the theater smiling and feel good as Batman embraces these people."

Apart from composition, Balfe also wrote few songs for the film, including "Who's The (Bat) Man" and "I Found You". Hefti's theme from the television series was interpreted for the original song "Who's The (Bat)Man" performed by Fall Out Boy frontman Patrick Stump. The song depicts the origin story of Bruce Wayne. McKay planned for a standalone original song for Batman as "he loved the idea that Batman fancied himself to be a Marilyn Manson/Trent Reznor type, somewhere between industrial and rap. He saw himself as this warrior poet and writes these earnest, dark-feeling songs". In the initial edit, the team planned to use "Bodies", but Warner Bros. felt that the song was not appropriate for a children's film, hence McKay roped in a team of songwriters to pen down a song for Batman. He initially liked the demo written by DJ Cheapshot which was "really funny, and also cool".

Other songs include: "Man in the Mirror" by Glen Ballard, a remix of "Heroes (We Could Be)" performed by Alesso, and remixed by Hard Rock Sofa and Skidka, "One" by Harry Nilsson and "(I Just) Died in Your Arms" performed by Cutting Crew. "Everything Is Awesome", which was featured in the soundtrack of The Lego Movie, was also included in the soundtrack. This version was performed by Richard Cheese & Lounge Against the Machine. However, the song was not featured in the film.

== Reception ==
Gizmodo's James Whitbrook said "While it's hard to imagine anything that could reach the infectious, earworm-y highs of The Lego Movie's 'Everything is Awesome', some newly released tracks from The Lego Batman Movie try very hard". Johnny Brayson of Bustle called it as "one of the best movie soundtracks of the year" and further called it as "the perfect accompaniment to the action, humor, and heart on screen, and fans shouldn't expect anything less from this franchise". Writing for Film Stories, Mark Harrison in his review for the collection of Batman soundtracks, singled out on The Lego Movie saying "The LEGO Batman Movie's soundtrack is designed to capture the conflicting identities of the Dark Knight, with an action score that veers between dramatic and tongue-in-cheek, as well as a bunch of pop-music needle-drops." Screen Rant also praised the soundtrack to The Lego Batman Movie saying "The songs of the Lego version add to its overall appeal and gives it an edge over the Adam West film, no matter how iconic the '60s theme song is."

James Southall of Movie Wave wrote "Its sheer energy as it carries you along is enough to keep the entertainment coming, but there is almost too much packed in, the changes in style sometimes so frequent, the pace so unwaveringly swift, you're left building up a real sweat just listening to it. Still – it's a lot of fun, it brings a frequent smile to the face, and sometimes you can't ask for more than that." Filmtracks.com wrote "Balfe continues to prove himself a master builder of really impressive, intelligent music for this genre, and his work here is ironically more engaging in most parts than his friend Hans' comparatively serious take on the same world." Sci-fi Bulletin wrote "A magpie of a score that borrows, steals, rewrites and still finds a way to adds its own contribution to the pantheon of Batman scores. Stripped away from the kinetic and colourful on-screen mayhem, you get to appreciate Balfe's work – a holy satisfying experience."

== Track listing ==
=== Standard edition ===
The soundtrack album to the film was released by WaterTower Music on February 3, 2017, a week before the release. It was accompanied by the lead single "Who's the (Bat) Man" performed by Patrick Stump, also released on the same day as the album. The album was released in digital formats, and also in two-disc CD — the first disc consisting of several original and accompanied songs, whereas the second disc consisted of film score composed by Lorne Balfe.

Disc 1
No.	Title	Writer(s)	Performer(s)	Length
1.	"Who's the (Bat) Man"	Neal Hefti; Chief WaKil; Brayden Deskins; Barry Pointer; Colton Fisher; Jason Rabinowitz; Jaron Lamont	Patrick Stump	3:04
2.	"Forever"	Justin Tranter; Dan Crean; Stevy Pyne; Cole Whittle	DNCE	3:49
3.	"(I Just) Died in Your Arms"	Nick Van Eede	Cutting Crew	4:36
4.	"Invincible"	Lindsay Rimes; Kirsten Arian	Kirsten Arian	2:59
5.	"One"	Harry Nilsson	Harry Nilsson	2:22
6.	"Heroes (We Could Be)" (Hard Rock Sofa and Skidka Remix)	Alesso; Tove Lo; David Bowie; Brian Eno	Alesso featuring Tove Lo	6:35
7.	"Man in the Mirror"	Glen Ballard; Siedah Garrett	Alex Aiono	3:48
8.	"Friends Are Family"	Chris Sernel; Madison Love; Hovey Benjamin; Jeff Lewis; Christopher Miller	Oh, Hush! featuring Will Arnett and Jeff Lewis	2:25
9.	"I Found You"	Lorne Balfe; Antony Genn	Fraser Murray	3:34
10.	"Forever"	Tranter; Crean; Pyne; Whittle	Justin Tranter	3:49
11.	"Man in the Mirror"	Ballard; Garrett	Richard Cheese & Lounge Against the Machine	1:49
12.	"Everything Is Awesome"	Shawn Patterson	Richard Cheese & Lounge Against the Machine	2:03

All music is composed by Lorne Balfe.

Disc 2
No.	Title	Length
1.	"Black"	7:32
2.	"Your Greatest Enemy"	2:42
3.	"The Arrival of Robin"	2:52
4.	"Joker Crashes the Party"	1:33
5.	"No Seat Belts Required"	2:18
6.	"To Cage the Joker"	1:59
7.	"The Phantom Zone"	3:37
8.	"Open for Business"	1:09
9.	"Chaos in Gotham"	3:20
10.	"Lava Attack"	7:40
11.	"For Your Own Good"	1:45
12.	"Joker Manor"	2:29
13.	"Batman's in the Zone"	4:40
14.	"The Babs Signal"	2:25
15.	"Battle Royale"	4:54
16.	"A Long Farewell"	2:49

=== Vinyl release ===
On May 19, 2017, WaterTower Music released the vinyl version of the soundtrack, only consisting the songs from the album. United Record Pressing published the vinyl pressings of the album in four editions: "Batman Edition" (black and yellow split colour), "Robin Red", "Joker Edition" (split purple and green vinyl) and "Batgirl" (lavender vinyl).

=== Film music not included in the album ===
#	Title	Performer(s)/Writer(s)	Key Scenes/Notes	Ref.
1	"Man In The Mirror"	Will Arnett	Batman quotes a Michael Jackson song during the opening credits.	
2	"Batman Theme"	Will Arnett	Batman ends up singing while continuously saying 'no' to Alfred.	
3	"Girls Know How"	Al Jarreau	Batman and Alfred throw a tuxedo dress-up party.	
4	"Bad Boys"	Will Arnett	Bruce quotes the song while posing for photos outside the gala.	
5	"Pop Goes The Weasel"	Traditional	The Joker and the other villains attack the gala.	
6	"We Are Family"	Michael Cera	Alfred shows Batman the surveillance video of Dick running around Wayne Mansion.	
7	"Bumper Batman Theme"	Neal Hefti	Batman and Robin run to the Batmobile.	
8	"It's Raining Men"	Michael Cera	Robin sings as he and Batman head off to the Fortress of Solitude.	
9	"The Fortress of Solitude"	John Williams	Batman and Robin arrive at the Fortress of Solitude	
10	"Theme from Superman (Concert Version)"	John Williams	Superman's doorbell	
11	"Planet Rock"	Afrika Bambaataa & the Soulsonic Force	Batman realizes Superman's throwing a Justice League anniversary party.	
12	"Fly, Robin, Fly"	Michael Cera	Robin sings while telling Batman about his code name, as he makes his way to the atomic cauldron.	
13	"I'm Batman"	Lil Dicky	Batman plays after sending The Joker to the Phantom Zone.	
14	"Toccata and Fugue in D Minor"	Johann Sebastian Bach	The Joker meets the occupants of the Phantom Zone.	
15	"Wake Me Up Before You Go-Go"	Wham!	First song on Robin's boombox.	
16	"Never Gonna Give You Up"	Rick Astley	Second song on Robin's boombox.	
17	"Fly, Robin, Fly"	Silver Convention	Third song on Robin's boombox.	

== Chart positions ==
Chart (2017)	Peak position
UK Soundtrack Albums (OCC)	27
US Billboard 200	187
US Soundtrack Albums (Billboard)	14
