= List of accolades received by The Lego Movie =

The Lego Movie accolades
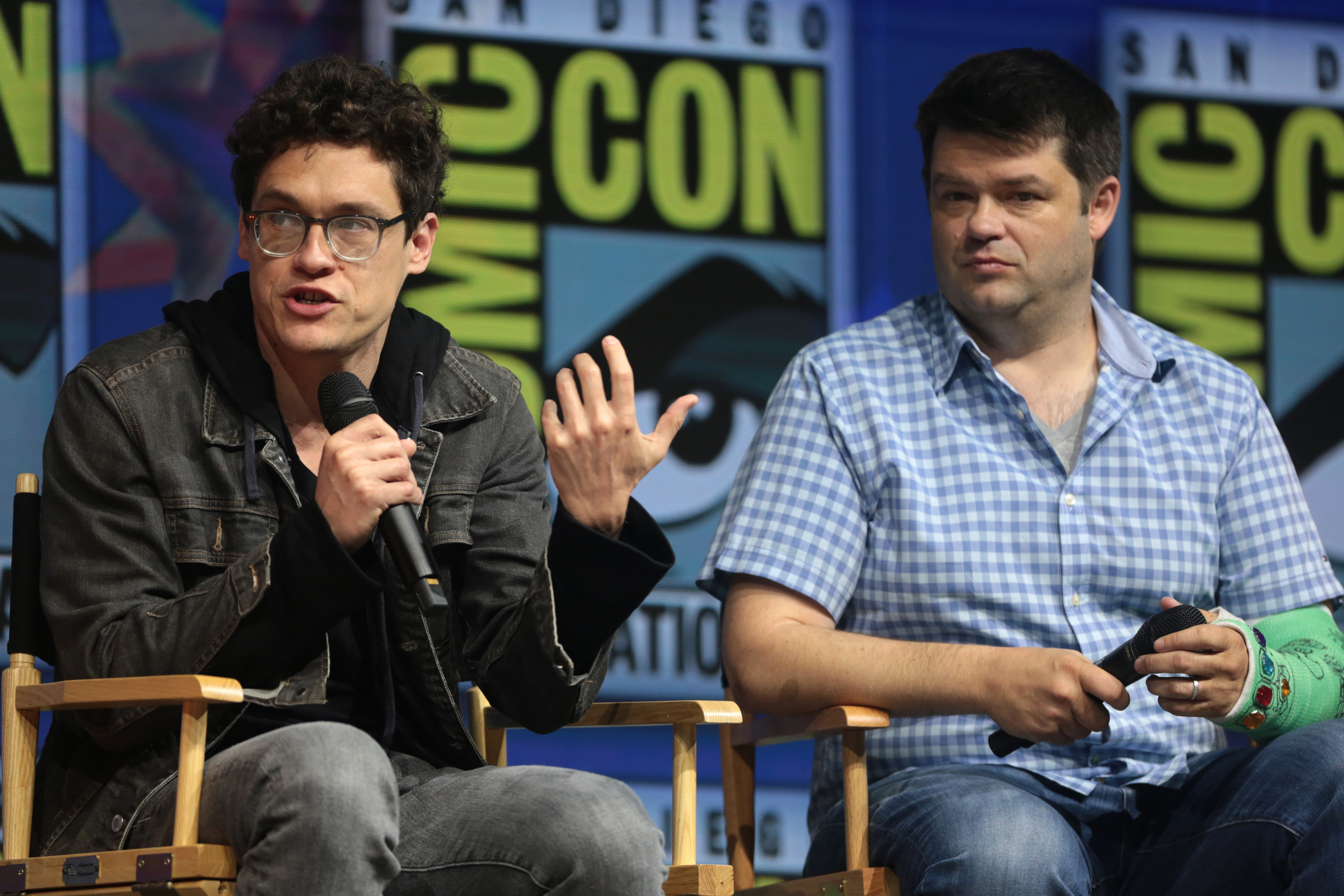
- Phil Lord and Christopher Miller garnered several accolades for directing the film.
Awards and nominations
Award	Wins	Nominations
3D Creative Arts Awards	1	1
AACTA Awards	1	1
AARP Movies for Grownups Awards	1	1
Academy Awards	0	1
Alliance of Women Film Journalists Awards	1	1
American Cinema Editors Awards	1	1
Annie Awards	1	6
ASCAP Awards	1	1
Austin Film Critics Association Awards	1	1
Black Reel Awards	1	1
BMI Film & TV Awards	1	1
Boston Society of Film Critics Awards	1	1
British Academy Children's Awards	1	2
British Academy Film Awards	1	1
Chicago Film Critics Association Awards	1	1
Cinema Audio Society Awards	0	1
Critics' Choice Movie Awards	1	2
Dallas–Fort Worth Film Critics Association Awards	1	1
Dublin Film Critics' Circle Awards	1	1
Empire Awards	0	1
Florida Film Critics Circle Awards	1	1
Georgia Film Critics Association Awards	1	2
Golden Globe Awards	0	1
Golden Reel Awards	0	1
Golden Trailer Awards	2	5
Grammy Awards	0	1
Heartland International Film Festival Awards	1	1
Hollywood Music in Media Awards	1	2
Houston Film Critics Society Awards	2	2
Hugo Awards	0	1
ICG Publicists Awards	0	1
International Cinephile Society Awards	0	1
Kansas City Film Critics Circle Awards	1	1
Kerrang! Awards	1	1
Los Angeles Film Critics Association Awards	1	1
National Board of Review Awards	2	2
Nebula Awards	0	1
New York Film Critics Circle Awards	1	1
New York Film Critics Online Awards	1	1
Nickelodeon Kids' Choice Awards	0	2
Online Film Critics Society Awards	1	2
People's Choice Awards	0	1
Producers Guild of America Awards	1	1
San Diego Film Critics Society Awards	0	1
San Francisco Film Critics Circle Awards	1	1
Satellite Awards	0	3
Saturn Awards	1	1
St. Louis Film Critics Association Awards	0	1
SXSW Film Festival Awards	1	1
Toronto Film Critics Association Awards	1	1
Village Voice Film Poll	1	1
Visual Effects Society Awards	0	2
Washington D.C. Area Film Critics Association Awards	1	2

Totals (Note: Certain award groups do not simply award one winner. They acknowledge several different recipients, have runners-up, and have third place. Since this is a specific recognition and is different from losing an award, runner-up mentions are considered wins in this award tally. For simplification and to avoid errors, each award in this list has been presumed to have had a prior nomination.)
- Wins: 40
- Nominations: 77

The Lego Movie is a 2014 animated adventure comedy film written and directed by Phil Lord and Christopher Miller from a story they co-wrote with Dan and Kevin Hageman. It stars the voices of Chris Pratt, Will Ferrell, Elizabeth Banks, Will Arnett, Nick Offerman, Alison Brie, Charlie Day, Liam Neeson, and Morgan Freeman. Based on the Lego line of construction toys, the film follows Emmet (Pratt), an ordinary construction worker Lego minifigure who helps a resistance movement stop a tyrannical businessman (Ferrell) from gluing everything in the Lego world into his vision of perfection.

A collaboration between production houses from the United States, Australia, and Denmark, The Lego Movie premiered in Los Angeles on February 1, 2014, and was released in the United States on February 7. Produced on a budget of $60–65 million, it grossed $468.1 million worldwide. On the review aggregator website Rotten Tomatoes, the movie boasts a 96% approval rating, derived from 253 critiques.

The Lego Movie garnered awards and nominations in various categories. It received a nomination for Best Original Song ("Everything Is Awesome") at the 87th Academy Awards. The film won one of six nominations at the 42nd Annie Awards. At the 67th British Academy Film Awards, it won Best Animated Film. The film received two nominations at the 20th Critics' Choice Awards and won Best Animated Feature. It was nominated for Best Animated Feature Film at the 72nd Golden Globe Awards. Various critic circles also picked The Lego Movie as the best animated feature film of the year. In addition, the National Board of Review named The Lego Movie one of the top-ten films of 2014.

== Accolades ==
Accolades received by The Lego Movie
Award	Date of ceremony	Category	Recipient(s)	Result	Ref.
3D Creative Arts Awards	January 28, 2015	Best Feature Film – Animation	The Lego Movie	Won	
AACTA Awards	January 29, 2015	Best Visual Effects or Animation	Chris McKay, Amber Naismith, Aidan Sarsfield, and Grant Freckelton	Won	
AARP Movies for Grownups Awards	February 2, 2015	Best Movie for Grownups Who Refuse to Grow Up	The Lego Movie	Won	
Academy Awards	February 22, 2015	Best Original Song	Shawn Patterson for "Everything Is Awesome"	Nominated	
Alliance of Women Film Journalists Awards	January 12, 2015	Best Animated Film	The Lego Movie	Won	
American Cinema Editors Awards	January 30, 2015	Best Edited Animated Feature Film	David Burrows and Chris McKay	Won	
Annie Awards	January 31, 2015	Best Animated Feature	The Lego Movie	Nominated	
Annie Awards	January 31, 2015	Outstanding Achievement for Animated Effects in an Animated Production	Jayandera Danappal, Matt Ebb, Christian Epunan Hernandez, Danielle Brooks, and Raphael Gadot	Nominated	
Annie Awards	January 31, 2015	Outstanding Achievement for Directing in a Feature Production	Phil Lord, Christopher Miller, and Chris McKay	Nominated	
Annie Awards	January 31, 2015	Outstanding Achievement for Production Design in an Animated Feature Production	Grant Freckelton	Nominated	
Annie Awards	January 31, 2015	Outstanding Achievement for Writing in a Feature Production	Phil Lord and Christopher Miller	Won	
Annie Awards	January 31, 2015	Outstanding Achievement for Editorial in a Feature Production	David Burrows, Todd Hansen, Doug Nicholas, Jonathan Tappin, and Courtney O'Brien-Brown	Nominated	
ASCAP Awards	March 9, 2015	Top Box Office Films	Shawn Patterson	Won	
Austin Film Critics Association Awards	December 17, 2014	Best Animated Film	The Lego Movie	Won	
Black Reel Awards	February 19, 2015	Best Voice Performance	Morgan Freeman	Won	
BMI Film & TV Awards	May 14, 2014	BMI Film Music Awards	Mark Mothersbaugh (Note: Also for Cloudy with a Chance of Meatballs 2 (2013) and the television series Regular Show)	Won	
Boston Society of Film Critics Awards	December 7, 2014	Best Animated Film	The Lego Movie	Runner-up	
British Academy Children's Awards	November 23, 2014	Kid's Vote — Film	The Lego Movie	Nominated	
British Academy Children's Awards	November 23, 2014	Feature Film	The Lego Movie	Won	
British Academy Film Awards	February 8, 2015	Best Animated Film	Phil Lord and Christopher Miller	Won	
Chicago Film Critics Association Awards	December 15, 2014	Best Animated Film	The Lego Movie	Won	
Cinema Audio Society Awards	February 14, 2015	Outstanding Achievement in Sound Mixing for a Motion Picture – Animated	Thomas J. O'Connell, Michael Semanick, Gregg Rudloff, Wayne Ashley, Brad Haehnel, and John Simpson	Nominated	
Critics' Choice Movie Awards	January 15, 2015	Best Animated Feature	The Lego Movie	Won	
Critics' Choice Movie Awards	January 15, 2015	Best Song	"Everything Is Awesome"	Nominated	
Dallas-Fort Worth Film Critics Association Awards	December 15, 2014	Best Animated Film	The Lego Movie	Won	
Dublin Film Critics' Circle Awards	December 17, 2014	Top Ten Films	The Lego Movie	4th place	
Empire Awards	March 29, 2015	Best Comedy	The Lego Movie	Nominated	
Florida Film Critics Circle Awards	December 19, 2014	Best Animated Film	The Lego Movie	Won	
Georgia Film Critics Association Awards	January 9, 2015	Best Animated Film	The Lego Movie	Won	
Georgia Film Critics Association Awards	January 9, 2015	Best Original Song	Shawn Patterson, Joshua Bartholomew, Lisa Harriton, and The Lonely Island for "Everything Is Awesome"	Nominated	
Golden Globe Awards	January 11, 2015	Best Animated Feature Film	The Lego Movie	Nominated	
Golden Reel Awards	February 15, 2015	Outstanding Achievement in Sound Editing – Sound Effects, Foley, Dialogue and ADR for Animated Feature Film	Wayne Pashley, Fabian Sanjurjo, John Simpson, Derryn Pasquill, Andrew Dorfman, Damian Candusso, Nigel Christensen, Jared Dwyer, Cameron Frankley, Rick Lisle, Jon Michaels, Andrew Miller, Emma Mitchell, Geoffrey G. Rubay, Ryan Squires, Sonal Joshi, Craig Beckett, Jim Harrison, and Tim Ryan	Nominated	
Golden Trailer Awards	May 30, 2014	Best Animation/Family	"The Special" (TRANSIT)	Nominated	
Golden Trailer Awards	May 30, 2014	Best Animation/Family TV Spot	"Special Cast" (TRANSIT)	Won	
Golden Trailer Awards	May 30, 2014	Best Animation/Family TV Spot	"Who Are You" (Aspect Ratio)	Nominated	
Golden Trailer Awards	May 30, 2014	Most Original TV Spot	"Something for Everyone" (Aspect Ratio)	Nominated	
Golden Trailer Awards	May 30, 2014	Most Innovative Advertising for a Brand/Product	"Behind the Bricks" (Aspect Ratio)	Won	
Grammy Awards	February 8, 2015	Best Song Written for Visual Media	"Everything Is Awesome"	Nominated	
Heartland International Film Festival Awards	May 30, 2014	Truly Moving Picture Award	The Lego Movie	Won	
Hollywood Music in Media Awards	November 4, 2014	Best Original Song in an Animated Film	Shawn Patterson, Tegan and Sara, and The Lonely Island for "Everything Is Awesome"	Won	
Hollywood Music in Media Awards	November 4, 2014	Best Original Score in an Animated Film	Mark Mothersbaugh	Nominated	
Houston Film Critics Society Awards	January 10, 2015	Best Animated Feature Film	The Lego Movie	Won	
Houston Film Critics Society Awards	January 10, 2015	Best Original Song	"Everything Is Awesome"	Won	
Hugo Awards	August 22, 2015	Best Dramatic Presentation, Long Form	Phil Lord and Christopher Miller, and Dan and Kevin Hageman	Nominated	
ICG Publicists Awards	February 20, 2015	Maxwell Weinberg Publicists Showmanship Motion Picture Award	The Lego Movie	Nominated	
International Cinephile Society Awards	February 20, 2015	Best Animated Film	The Lego Movie	Nominated	
Kansas City Film Critics Circle Awards	December 14, 2014	Best Animated Feature	The Lego Movie	Won	
Kerrang! Awards	June 12, 2014	Best Film	The Lego Movie	Won	
Los Angeles Film Critics Association Awards	December 7, 2014	Best Animated Film	The Lego Movie	Runner-up	
National Board of Review Awards	December 2, 2014	Best Original Screenplay	Phil Lord and Christopher Miller	Won (Note: This award does not have a single winner, but recognizes multiple films.)	
National Board of Review Awards	December 2, 2014	Top 10 Films	The Lego Movie	Won	
Nebula Awards	June 5, 2015	Ray Bradbury Nebula Award for Outstanding Dramatic Presentation	Phil Lord and Christopher Miller	Nominated	
New York Film Critics Circle Awards	January 5, 2015	Best Animated Film	The Lego Movie	Won	
New York Film Critics Online Awards	December 7, 2014	Best Animated Feature	The Lego Movie	Won	
Nickelodeon Kids' Choice Awards	March 28, 2015	Favorite Animated Movie	The Lego Movie	Nominated	
Nickelodeon Kids' Choice Awards	March 28, 2015	Favorite Movie Actor	Will Arnett (Note: Also for Teenage Mutant Ninja Turtles (2014))	Nominated	
Online Film Critics Society Awards	December 15, 2014	Best Picture	The Lego Movie	Nominated	
Online Film Critics Society Awards	December 15, 2014	Best Animated Film	The Lego Movie	Won	
People's Choice Awards	January 7, 2015	Favorite Family Movie	The Lego Movie	Nominated	
Producers Guild of America Awards	January 24, 2015	Best Animated Motion Picture	Dan Lin	Won	
San Diego Film Critics Society Awards	December 15, 2014	Best Animated Film	The Lego Movie	Nominated	
San Francisco Film Critics Circle Awards	December 14, 2014	Best Animated Feature	The Lego Movie	Won	
Satellite Awards	February 15, 2015	Best Motion Picture Animated or Mixed Media	The Lego Movie	Nominated	
Satellite Awards	February 15, 2015	Best Original Screenplay	Phil Lord and Christopher Miller	Nominated	
Satellite Awards	February 15, 2015	Best Original Song	"Everything Is Awesome"	Nominated	
Saturn Awards	June 25, 2015	Best Animated Film	The Lego Movie	Won	
St. Louis Film Critics Association Awards	December 15, 2014	Best Animated Feature	The Lego Movie	Nominated	
SXSW Film Festival Awards	March 11, 2014	Film Design Award – Special Jury Recognition	The Lego Movie	Won	
Toronto Film Critics Association Awards	December 15, 2014	Best Animated Film	The Lego Movie	Runner-up	
Village Voice Film Poll	December 16, 2014	Best Animated Feature	The Lego Movie	Won	
Visual Effects Society Awards	February 4, 2015	Outstanding Visual Effects in an Animated Feature	Chris McKay, Amber Naismith, Jim Dodd, and David Williams	Nominated	
Visual Effects Society Awards	February 4, 2015	Outstanding Effects Simulations in an Animated Feature	Carsten Kolve, Jayandera Danappal, Matt Ebb, and Miles Green	Nominated	
Washington D.C. Area Film Critics Association Awards	December 8, 2014	Best Animated Feature	The Lego Movie	Won	
Washington D.C. Area Film Critics Association Awards	December 8, 2014	Best Original Screenplay	Phil Lord and Christopher Miller	Nominated	
