= The Lego Ninjago Movie (soundtrack) =

The Lego Ninjago Movie (Original Motion Picture Soundtrack)

Soundtrack album by Mark Mothersbaugh and various artists
- Released: 15 September 2017
- Recorded: 2017
- Studio: Trackdown, Sydney, Australia
- Genre: Film soundtrack; film score
- Length: 60:09
- Label: WaterTower Music
- Producer: Mark Mothersbaugh; Shawn Patterson; Joshua Bartholomew

Mark Mothersbaugh chronology
Brad's Status (2017)	The Lego Ninjago Movie (2017)	Thor: Ragnarok (2017)

Singles from The Lego Ninjago Movie (Original Motion Picture Soundtrack)
- 1. "Heroes" Released: 15 September 2017

The Lego Ninjago Movie (Original Motion Picture Soundtrack) is the soundtrack to the 2017 film The Lego Ninjago Movie, which is the third instalment in The Lego Movie franchise. The album featured five original songs along with the score composed by Mark Mothersbaugh. The 23-track soundtrack album was released through WaterTower Music on 15 September 2017.

== Background ==
Mark Mothersbaugh, who composed the score for The Lego Movie, returned to score The Lego Ninjago Movie. Along with the score, the album includes five new songs created for the film—"Heroes", "Operation New Me", "It's Garmadon", "Found My Place", and "Dance of Doom". The Japanese version features an exclusive theme song, performed by the band Johnny's West, "Mou 1% (Another 1%)". Flautist Greg Pattillo covered three songs as part of Master Wu's flute music, which are—"(It's the) Hard Knock Life" from Annie (2014), "Welcome to the Jungle" by the hard rock band Guns N' Roses and "The Power" by Snap!. The soundtrack was released through WaterTower Music on 15 September 2017, a week ahead of the film's release.

== Additional music ==
The song "Bad Blood" by Taylor Swift featuring Kendrick Lamar appeared in the film's trailers, while the second trailer also featured "It Must Have Been Love" by Roxette, "Ain't Gonna Die Tonight" by Macklemore and "I Wanna Go Out" by American Authors. Both songs were not featured in the soundtrack album, along with other pop songs, which include—"The Weekend Whip" by The Fold, "Secret Garden" by Bruce Springsteen, "Cui Cui" by Xavier Cugat, Fausto Curbelo and Al Stillman, and "I Got a Name" by Jim Croce. "The Weekend Whip" by The Fold, which serves as the opening theme to the Ninjago TV series, appears in the film as Lloyd's ringtone.

== Critical reception ==
Tom Alphin of Brick Architect reviewed the film's music, describing it as "a bit heavy-handed at times, but the film isn't trying to be subtle, so it works". Andrew Barker of Variety described the music as "forgettable". Angie Han of Mashable felt that "there aren't any songs in it catchy enough to get stuck in your head."

== Track listing ==
All tracks are written and produced by Mark Mothersbaugh, Shawn Patterson and Joshua Bartholomew, except where indicated.

The Lego Ninjago Movie (Original Motion Picture Soundtrack) track listing
No.	Title	Writer(s)	Producer(s)	Length
1.	"Heroes" (Blaze n Vill)	Will Fuller; Alex Geringas	Geringas	3:26
2.	"Operation New Me" (Jingle Punks)	Chris McKay; Jamil Kazmi; Takahiro Moriuchi; Jeff Peters; Jared Gutstadt	Gutstadt	2:37
3.	"It's Garmadon" (The De Luca Brothers)	De Luca	De Luca	2:49
4.	"Found My Place" (Oh, Hush! feat. Jeff Lewis)	Chris Sernel; Lewis	Oh, Hush!	3:16
5.	"Dance Of Doom" (Louis Cole and Genevieve Artadi)	Cole; Artadi	Cole	3:24
6.	"Lego Ninja Shop"			2:41
7.	"(It's the) Hard Knock Life" (Greg Pattillo)	Charles Strouse; Martin Charnin		0:16
8.	"Wise Master Wu"			3:01
9.	"Garmadon Attacks"			3:15
10.	"The Rise of Kitty Kitty"			3:38
11.	"A Wish and A Ruined City"			3:37
12.	"Journey to the Control Tower"			2:20
13.	"Welcome to the Jungle" (Pattillo)	Axl Rose; Duff McKagan; Izzy Stradlin; Saul Hudson		0:28
14.	"The Power" (Pattillo)	Antoinette Colandreo; Benito Benites; John Garrett III		0:21
15.	"Sibling Rivalry"			2:36
16.	"A Grave Amount of Generals"			3:30
17.	"Ninja's to the Rescue"			2:17
18.	"Arm Popping Flying Lesson"			4:53
19.	"The Lady Iron Dragon"			5:01
20.	"The Ultimate Ultimate Weapon"			5:10
21.	"The Art of Spinjitsu"			4:21
22.	"Here Kitty Kitty"			3:17
23.	"Big Hug"			2:39
Total length:				68:53

== Personnel ==
Credits adapted from WaterTower Music:

- Music composed and produced by – Mark Mothersbaugh
- Programming – Albert Fox, Annie Rosevear, Bobby Brader, Christopher Guardino, Jeremy Levy, John Enroth, Jordan Siegel, Maxwell Karmazyn, Pete Siebert, Richie Kohan, Sarah Lynch, Sunna Wehrmixer, Wataru Hokoyama, Tim Jones
- Arrangements – Wataru Hokoyama
- Sound engineer – Mal Luker
- Mixing – Brad Haehnel
- Mastering – Stephen Marsh
- Music editor – Dominick Certo
- Music supervisor – Kier Lehman
- Music co-ordinator – Linda Christie
- Executive producer – Chris McKay
- Art direction – Sandeep Sriram

Orchestra and choir

- Orchestra – The Sydney Scoring Orchestra
- Choir – Cantillation Choir
- Conductor and orchestrator – Tim Davies
- Choir manager – Alison Johnston

== Chart performance ==
Chart performance for The Lego Ninjago Movie (Original Motion Picture Soundtrack)
Chart (2017)	Peak position
UK Soundtrack Albums (OCC)	36
