= The Lego Movie (soundtrack) =

The Lego Movie (Original Motion Picture Soundtrack)

Soundtrack album by Mark Mothersbaugh
- Released: February 4, 2014
- Recorded: 2013–2014
- Venue: Trackdown Studios (Sydney)
- Genre: Film score
- Length: 58:10
- Label: WaterTower Music
- Producers: Mark Mothersbaugh; Shawn Patterson; Joshua Bartholomew

Mark Mothersbaugh chronology
Last Vegas (2013)	The Lego Movie (2014)	22 Jump Street (2014)

Singles from The Lego Movie (Original Motion Picture Soundtrack)
- 1. "Everything Is Awesome" Released: January 27, 2014

The Lego Movie (Original Motion Picture Soundtrack) is the soundtrack to the 2014 animated film The Lego Movie. It was released by WaterTower Music on February 4, 2014. The album features the original score composed by Mark Mothersbaugh, consisting of about 23 tracks on the album. He recorded two scores for the film: an electronic and a 40-piece orchestral music, with more than 100 players working on the score. He arranged few synthesisers and circuit bent to make use of the electronic music created for the film, which consisted of "bright, popping, almost frenetic music with an underpinning of emotional swells".

The album features an original song titled "Everything Is Awesome" written by Shawn Patterson, Joshua Bartholomew, and Lisa Harriton, who also performed the song in the film under the name, Jo Li. The track which was released as a single from the album on January 23, is performed by Tegan and Sara featuring The Lonely Island (Andy Samberg, Akiva Schaffer, and Jorma Taccone) who wrote the rap lyrics, and is the first song played in the opening credits of the film, while the alternative version sung by Jo Li was featured in the end credits. It also featured an unplugged version by Patterson and Sammy Allen and an instrumental version.

The score and the song received positive reception, praising Mothersbaugh's composition. The track "Everything Is Awesome" received a nomination for Academy Award for Best Original Song (losing to "Glory" from Selma) and Grammy Award for Best Song Written for Visual Media (losing to "Let It Go" from Frozen).

== Overview ==
The film marks Mothersbaugh's third collaboration with Phil Lord and Christopher Miller after Cloudy with a Chance of Meatballs (2009) and 21 Jump Street (2012). He worked on the score of the film, simultaneously with the music production of their forthcoming film 22 Jump Street, also directed by Lord and Miller and is a sequel to 21 Jump Street. The score was recorded at Trackdown Studios, Sydney during late-2013 and 2014.

In an interview with Entertainment Weekly, Mothersbaugh stated "We were looking for sounds that created a universe for the LEGOs that was unique [...] I started assembling a sonic palette off of old analog synths that I used with DEVO and newer circuit bent (Note: Mothersbaugh explained about circuit bending in an interview with Deadline Hollywood, saying: "If you go on YouTube, you can see these people who pull out all these crazy, electronic Speak and Spells to Elmo dolls and Casio keyboards and combine the sounds. It's circuit bending. These people even have their own circuit bent instruments. They are the vocabulary of modern music. So I looked at a lot of that gear, and I created this palate of electronic sounds.") things that I got in the past three or four years and then just kind of borrowing from electronic music through the years. You think of LEGOs as these rigid horizontal and vertical pieces. But to see them as clouds and explosions, or water running [...] it made me want to come up with sounds that were as interesting as the way they were making the film look." Hence, Mothersbaugh created an electronic and orchestral score, the later consisted of a 40-piece choir and about 100-players to emphasize the story and allow the directors Lord and Miller which sound will suit for the film.

The duo wrote the original song "Everything is Awesome" before the shooting of the film. In an interview with Fox News, Mothersbaugh says the song "was supposed to be like mind control early in the film. It's totally irritating, this kind of mindless mantra to get people up and working. It's like the whip crack on their back, but then by the end of the movie it morphs into, instead of being just a mindless, go-to-work song it becomes about co-operation and people working together to do bigger things." He recorded several versions of the track which appears throughout the film in varying contexts. However, according to him, the version sung by The Lonely Island, was "one of his favourite".

With the exception for The Lego Batman Movie (2017), which was composed by Lorne Balfe, Mothersbaugh returned to score music for The Lego Ninjago Movie (2017) and the direct sequel, The Lego Movie 2: The Second Part (2019). The remix version of "Everything Is Awesome" performed by Tween Dream was featured in the sequel, and a spin-off track titled "Everything's Not Awesome" was created.

== Track listing ==
No.	Title	Performer(s)	Length
1.	"Everything Is Awesome" (Original)	Tegan and Sara ft. The Lonely Island	2:43
2.	"Prologue"		2:28
3.	"Emmet's Morning"		2:00
4.	"Emmet Falls in Love"		1:11
5.	"Escape"		3:27
6.	"Into the Old West"		1:00
7.	"Wyldstyle Explains"		1:21
8.	"Emmet's Mind"		2:17
9.	"The Transformation"		1:46
10.	"Saloons and Wagons"		3:38
11.	"Batman"		1:23
12.	"Middle Zealand"		0:28
13.	"Cloud Cuckooland and Ben the Spaceman"		1:25
14.	"Emmet's Speech"		2:02
15.	"Submarines and Metal Beard"		1:49
16.	"Requiem for Cuckooland"		1:23
17.	"Reaching the Kragle"		2:35
18.	"Emmet's Plan"		1:54
19.	"The Truth"		3:16
20.	"Wyldstyle Leads"		2:46
21.	"Let's Put It All Back"		2:02
22.	"I Am a Master Builder"		2:48
23.	"My Secret Weapon"		4:19
24.	"We Did It!"		1:31
25.	"Everything Is Awesome" (Movie version)	Jo Li (Joshua Bartholomew and Lisa Harriton)	1:26
26.	"Everything Is Awesome" (Unplugged)	Shawn Patterson and Sammy Allen	1:24
27.	"Untitled Self Portrait"	Will Arnett	1:08
28.	"Everything Is Awesome" (Instrumental)		2:41
Total length:			58:10

== Charts ==
Chart positions
Chart (2014)	Peak position
Australian Albums (ARIA)	82
UK Independent Album Breakers (OCC)	8
UK Compilation Albums (OCC)	13
UK Soundtrack Albums (OCC)	3
US Billboard 200	37
US Independent Albums (Billboard)	8
US Top Soundtracks (Billboard)	2

== Accolades ==
Accolades received by The Lego Movie
Award	Date of ceremony	Category	Recipient(s)	Result	Ref.
Academy Awards	February 22, 2015	Best Original Song	Shawn Patterson for "Everything Is Awesome"	Nominated	
BMI Film & TV Awards	May 14, 2014	BMI Film Music Awards	Mark Mothersbaugh (Note: Also for Cloudy with a Chance of Meatballs 2 (2013) and the television series Regular Show)	Won	
Critics' Choice Movie Awards	January 15, 2015	Best Song	"Everything Is Awesome"	Nominated	
Georgia Film Critics Association Awards	January 9, 2015	Best Original Song	Shawn Patterson, Joshua Bartholomew, Lisa Harriton, and The Lonely Island for "Everything Is Awesome"	Nominated	
Grammy Awards	February 8, 2015	Best Song Written for Visual Media	"Everything Is Awesome"	Nominated	
Hollywood Music in Media Awards	November 4, 2014	Best Original Song in an Animated Film	"Everything Is Awesome"	Won	
Hollywood Music in Media Awards	November 4, 2014	Best Original Score in an Animated Film	Mark Mothersbaugh	Nominated	
Houston Film Critics Society Awards	January 10, 2015	Best Original Song	"Everything Is Awesome"	Won	
Satellite Awards	February 15, 2015	Best Original Song	"Everything Is Awesome"	Nominated	
