= I Found You =

I Found You may refer to:

- "I Found You" (Benny Blanco and Calvin Harris song), 2018
- "I Found You" (The Wanted song), 2012
- "I Found You" (Sub Focus & Hayla song), 2023
- "I Found You", song by Alabama Shakes from Boys & Girls
- "I Found You", song by Tilly and the Wall from O
- "I Found You", song by LA Guns from album Hollywood Vampires
- "I Found You", song by Blues Image, Gary Dunham, 1975
- "I Found You", song by The Fixx, 1982
- "I Found You", song by Frankie Laine, Craig Evans, 1968
- "I Found You", song by Gene Clark from the album Gene Clark with the Gosdin Brothers, 1967
- "I Found You", song by Russ Hamilton (singer), Joe Lubin, 1959
- "I Found You", song by Wally Cox, Cox USA
- "I Found You", song by Yvonne Fair And The James Brown Band, 1962
- "I Found You", song by Fraser Murray on The Lego Batman Movie soundtrack, 2017
- "I Found U", song by Axwell featuring Max'C, 2007
- "I Found U", song by Passion Pit and Galantis, 2019
