= Loving Vincent (soundtrack) =

2017 film soundtrack album

Loving Vincent (Original Motion Picture Soundtrack)

Film score by Clint Mansell
- Released: 22 September 2017
- Recorded: 2017
- Studios: AIR Studios, London
- Genre: Film score
- Length: 50:49
- Label: Milan
- Producers: Clint Mansell; Geoff Foster

Clint Mansell chronology
Ghost in the Shell (2017)	Loving Vincent (2017)	Mute (2018)

Loving Vincent (Original Motion Picture Soundtrack) is the film score to the 2017 film Loving Vincent directed by Dorota Kobiela and Hugh Welchman. The film score is composed by Clint Mansell, who co-produced the album with Geoff Foster, and released through Milan Records on 22 September 2017.

== Background ==
Clint Mansell scored the music for Loving Vincent, who had been approached by Kobiela exclaiming that she had listened to his music while writing the script and said that nobody other than Mansell could possibly score the film, which led to Mansell being the sole choice. He eventually liked the script and idea, which he felt that it was done through the belief and love of art. Mansell felt that the script was mostly a trial and error process, having "many, many waste paper baskets full of discarded ideas to get to the things that speak to you, seem to attach to the picture" but over the course of the project, Mansell formed a simpatico relationship with Van Gogh in a familiar way, considering him "the first punk rocker because he was doing exactly what he wanted and sod the consequences" especially with the mood he achieved with his paintings and the emotional spectrum that drew into deliver a work of art.

== Release ==
The album was preceded with "The Sower with Setting Sun" which released on August 25, 2017. It was released through Milan Records on September 22, 2017.

== Reception ==
Philippa Nicole Barr of Drowned in Sound wrote "one of the defining features of this collection is its sense of continuity, which must synchronise well with the animation– unravelling the film in 65,000 hand painted frames, so like an style is like that of a Van Gogh painting. All the names of the songs are derived from the names of paintings, giving them a visual and emotional reference which distinguishes them throughout the narrative."

The Film Scorer wrote "The atmosphere Mansell creates causes the viewer to get lost in the beautiful, often tranquil oil paintings, while the undercurrent of melancholia persists throughout." Susan Wloszczyna of RogerEbert.com wrote "Helping to set the right melancholy mood is a superb score by Clint Mansell, propelled by strings and piano". Peter Debruge of Variety called it a "gorgeous score". David Ehrlich of IndieWire wrote "Clint Mansell's characteristically fluid score maintains [some] sort of audiovisual equilibrium."

== Track listing ==
No.	Title	Artist(s)	Length
1.	"The Night Café"		4:07
2.	"The Yellow House"		4:45
3.	"At Eternity's Gate"		3:40
4.	"Portrait Of Armand Roulin"		2:58
5.	"Marguerite Gachet At The Piano"		2:30
6.	"Still Life With Glass Of Absinthe & A Carafe"		3:12
7.	"The Painter On His Way To Work On The Road To Tarascon"		3:48
8.	"Five Sunflowers in A Vase"		3:17
9.	"Wheatfield With Crows"		2:50
10.	"Thatched Roofs In Chaponval"		4:01
11.	"Blossoming Chestnut Trees"		4:54
12.	"The Sower With Setting Sun"		4:47
13.	"Starry Night Over The Rhone"		1:17
14.	"Starry Starry Night"	Lianne La Havas	4:43
Total length:			50:49

== Accolades ==
Year	Ceremony	Category	Recipient(s)	Result	Ref.
2017	Hollywood Music in Media Awards 2017	Best Original Score	Clint Mansell	Nominated	
2018	International Film Music Critics Association	Best Original Score in an Animated Film	Clint Mansell	Nominated	
2018	45th Annie Awards	Outstanding Achievement for Music in an Animated Feature Production	Clint Mansell	Nominated	
