= The Magic Portal =

1989 film by Lindsay Fleay

- Title poster
- Directed by: Lindsay Fleay
- Written by: Lindsay Fleay
- Based on: Lego Construction Toys
- Produced by: Lindsay Fleay
- Starring: Ingle Knight; Bernie Davis; Ross Bryant; Tina Williamson; Lindsay Fleay
- Cinematography: Lindsay Fleay
- Edited by: Lindsay Fleay
- Music by: Thomas Kayser; Kim Lord
- Production company: Deadly Dingbat Films
- Distributed by: Deadly Dingbat Films
- Release date: 9 October 1989
- Running time: 16 minutes
- Country: Australia
- Language: English

The Magic Portal is a 1989 live-action/stop motion animated sci-fi adventure short film written, produced and directed by Lindsay Fleay. Filmed with the Lego line of construction toys, the film is considered to be a significant example of early brickfilms. The film tells the story of an astronaut that finds a mysterious portal that transports him and his crew to strange and wondrous worlds. Fleay appears in a live-action role.

== Plot ==
In a Lego spaceship run by minifigures, astronaut Pee finds his crew mate El leaving Captain Paranoia's office in disappointment. Ignoring Pee's concerns, El walks by him aimlessly around the ship until stumbling upon a mysterious rectangular portal. El walks through the portal and still remains on board the ship, but finds the portal's other side leads to a dark tunnel upon turning around. Eager to find what is on the other side of the portal, El enters, and the tunnel pulls him through.

El arrives at the other side of the portal, located in a maze. He is soon visited by red brick-built creatures that build El a car out of thin air. El climbs inside the car excitedly and drives through the maze, and the red creatures enter the portal to board the ship. As El drives his car around and meets other sentient brick-built creatures, he finds a menacing two-headed beast (each head having an excavator claw for a mouth) is following him. El tries to escape the beast, while nearly getting hit by a train in the process, and the car breaks down just as he finds the portal again. El leaves behind his car and runs for the portal, but he trips over one of the car's loose tires and falls. The beast arrives to eat his car, and it charges after the tire, causing El to faint, and therefore sending the beast over him, through the portal, and into the ship, which, for a moment, appears to be used as an animation set.

El wakes back up and reenters the portal to inform Captain Paranoia about his experience. Paranoia disbelieves El and kicks him out of his office and into some live wires. Pee, however, is intrigued by El's story and asks him to take him to the portal. El guides him there, but finds the portal is gone. The ship's alarm goes off, waking up Paranoia from his nap and getting him to open his office door and find the red creatures El encountered earlier, phasing through the ship's walls. Paranoia collects his blaster before searching for the creatures, but instead finds the portal right behind him. He enters and is transported to a blank location.

As Paranoia looks around, a plasticine shark fin follows him around, bringing him to shoot at it, causing it to fall on its side. The Plasticine turns into various things, such as a wall, a cannon, and a toilet tank, to playfully toy with Paranoia. As Paranoia is flushed through the floor by the Plasticine, it skates through the portal to board the ship. Paranoia finds the floor was just a sheet of paper, and looks for El and Pee, who are sitting in the ship, again presenting itself as an animation set.

Paranoia, who now believes El, finds his ship in ruins, but regroups with El and Pee and take them to the portal, with the Plasticine following them, where they are all transported to a desktop. There, L and P befriend the Plasticine, which Paranoia tries to shoot at again, but this time, El and Pee defend it, believing it is harmless. However, Paranoia finds they are being spied on by robots made of screws and bottles of correction fluid. Paranoia leads El, Pee, and the Plasticine across the desktop to get them to safety, but the robots ambush them. Paranoia sends the three off before firing his blaster at the robots, but the robots shoot back at him, and the Plasticine rescues Paranoia before he is shot. Now being pursued by both the robots and much larger items now depicted as other robots, they find an emergency exit that leads them to the bottom of the desk, where they find a shoe, which they use as a car to escape the robots.

As they flee, the two-headed beast that El escaped earlier scares off the robots, but resumes its chase with El. Outside of the house, El, Pee, Paranoia, and the Plasticine hide from the beast and continue driving outside and into a shack, which the Animator is using as an animation space. They drive up a ramp to get back up onto the table, but they end up ruining the Animator's hard work (their ship). The beast, who tracked down the group by their scent, follows them inside and further tears down the animation set, while destroying itself in the process. The Animator, upset, takes El, Pee, and Captain Paranoia out of his shoe and return them to their positions, while the Plasticine's fate is left undetermined. In a time-lapse where the Animator fixes the ship, El continues doing his job. For a brief moment, the red creatures reveal themselves to still be on board the ship, and the camera zooms into the portal, turning to darkness.

== Cast ==
- Ingle Knight as El, the protagonist of the film, and the yellow astronaut with a black “L” emblem on his torso.
- Bernie Davis as Pee, El's crew mate and friend, and the white astronaut with a red “P” emblem on his torso.
- Ross Bryant as Captain Paranoia, the hard-nosed captain of the ship.
- Tina Williamson as the Plasticine, a sentient clay organism with the ability to change her shape into various objects, who would eventually befriend the three heroes.
- Lindsay Fleay as the stop-motion animator (himself).

== History ==
The film was produced in Perth, Australia from 1985 to 1989. The film was shot on a Bolex 16mm camera. Fleay, who wrote, directed, produced and narrated the film, was able to secure partial financing from the Australian Film Commission, allowing for higher production values than typically seen in brickfilms. He made his own Lego faces with ink, and used several fans to prevent the plastic from overheating under the photographic lights.

Fleay sent the film to Lego, who initially responded positively, but then sent him a cease and desist letter, threatening legal action. Over time, Lego softened its stance to the film and fan films in general; in 2014 the company included a handmade representation of a "magic portal" in its film The Lego Movie.

== See also ==
- En rejse til månen, the earliest known brickfilm
- List of Lego films and TV series
