= Thor: Ragnarok (soundtrack) =

Thor: Ragnarok (Original Motion Picture Soundtrack)

Film score by Mark Mothersbaugh
- Released: October 20, 2017
- Recorded: Abbey Road Studios
- Genre: Synthwave
- Length: 72:52
- Labels: Hollywood; Marvel Music
- Producers: Alan Meyerson; Mark Mothersbaugh

Mark Mothersbaugh chronology
The Lego Ninjago Movie (2017)	Thor: Ragnarok (Original Motion Picture Soundtrack) (2017)	Hotel Transylvania 3: Summer Vacation (2018)

Thor: Ragnarok (Original Motion Picture Soundtrack) is the film score to the Marvel Studios film Thor: Ragnarok composed by Mark Mothersbaugh. Hollywood Records released the album digitally on October 20, 2017, with a physical release on November 10, 2017.

== Background ==
By August 2016, Mark Mothersbaugh was hired to score the film. Mothersbaugh was influenced by a video essay from the YouTube channel Every Frame a Painting, which criticized the scores from previous Marvel Cinematic Universe films for their lack of memorability, to make the score for Thor: Ragnarok as distinctive as possible. The score was recorded at Abbey Road Studios. The synthesized score is influenced by the work of Jean-Michel Jarre. Mothersbaugh combined synthesizer keyboards he used from his days with the band Devo with a 100 piece orchestra. Patrick Doyle's themes from Thor and Brian Tyler's themes from Thor: The Dark World and Avengers: Age of Ultron, as well as Joe Harnell's "The Lonely Man" theme from The Incredible Hulk series, are also used in the film. Director Taika Waititi would have asked the band Queen to work on the soundtrack for the film (if their lead singer Freddie Mercury was still alive) because the film is "a cool bold, colorful cosmic adventure" which would have suited the "feel" of the band. Hollywood Records released the film's soundtrack digitally on October 20, 2017, and was released physically on November 10, 2017.

== Track listing ==
All music composed by Mark Mothersbaugh.

No.	Title	Length
1.	"Ragnarok Suite"	8:53
2.	"Running Short on Options"	2:46
3.	"Thor: Ragnarok"	1:09
4.	"Weird Things Happen"	1:46
5.	"Twilight of the Gods"	6:14
6.	"Hela vs. Asgard"	4:30
7.	"Where am I?"	1:39
8.	"Grandmaster's Chambers"	1:18
9.	"The Vault"	3:47
10.	"No One Escapes"	3:01
11.	"Arena Fight"	3:32
12.	"Where's the Sword?"	4:33
13.	"Go"	1:43
14.	"What Heroes Do"	1:37
15.	"Flashback"	2:59
16.	"Parade"	2:20
17.	"The Revolution Has Begun"	1:47
18.	"Sakaar Chase"	2:12
19.	"Devil's Anus"	4:52
20.	"Asgard Is a People"	4:20
21.	"Where To?" (includes theme from Thor by Patrick Doyle)	2:22
22.	"Planet Sakaar"	2:14
23.	"Grandmaster Jam Session"	3:16
Total length:		72:52

== Additional music ==
Additional music featured in the film include "Immigrant Song" by Led Zeppelin and "Main Title" ("Golden Ticket"/"Pure Imagination") by Walter Scharf from the film Willy Wonka & the Chocolate Factory. "In the Face of Evil" by Magic Sword is featured in the official trailer.

== Charts ==
Weekly chart performance for Thor: Ragnarok (Original Motion Picture Soundtrack)
Chart (2017)	Peak position
UK Album Downloads (OCC)	69
UK Soundtrack Albums (OCC)	21
