= En rejse til månen =

1973 Danish brickfilm

- The film's opening title
- Directed by: Lars C. Hassing; Henrik Hassing
- Release date: 1973
- Running time: 6 minutes
- Country: Denmark
- Language: Danish

En rejse til månen (Journey to the Moon) is a 1973 Danish stop motion animated short film created by cousins Lars and Henrik Hassing. Primarily consisting of Lego elements, it is considered to be the earliest known amateur brickfilm.

== Plot ==
After the introduction, the film opens with a large Lego city layout with different structures and vehicles. A bus drives to a space base, where a group of astronauts boards a rocket that takes off. The crew arrives on the moon in a lunar lander. After traversing the moon's landscape, they then return to and take a second voyage into space. After returning to Earth and completing their mission, they return to land by ship.

== Production ==
The film, generally considered the first known amateur Lego animation, was created by Lars C. Hassing and Henrik Hassing, who were 12 and 10 years old, respectively, for their grandparents' wedding anniversary. It has no sound and was filmed with a borrowed Super 8 camera. Since minifigures had not yet been produced during this period, existing Lego elements were used to represent characters in the film. Painted landscapes seen in the film were custom creations.

After hearing from them about the production of the short film, Godtfred Kirk Christiansen, The Lego Group's owner at the time, rewarded them with a personal tour of Lego's factory and gave them free copies of sets. He also had additional copies of the film made.

The short film was not released publicly until May 2013, when it was uploaded to YouTube, forty years after it was created.

== See also ==
- The Magic Portal, another well-known early brickfilm
