= Stop Motion Studio =

Animation software

- Developer: Cateater LLC
- Release: September 7, 2011; 14 years ago
- Stable release: v25.12 / December 26, 2025; 8 months ago
- Operating system: iOS; Android macOS; Microsoft Windows
- Website: www.stopmotionstudio.com

Stop Motion Studio is a stop motion animation software developed by Cateater LLC. It is available as both an app for iOS and Android and as a software for Windows and Mac.

Two versions of the software exist, the standard Stop Motion Studio for free, and the paid Stop Motion Studio Pro, which contains extra, more advanced features. The software is commonly used in brickfilming. The software provides a frame-by-frame editor for arranging, removing, and adding frames, as well as tools for adding audio, titles, credits, and visual effects.
