= Delaney Gibson =

American singer-songwriter

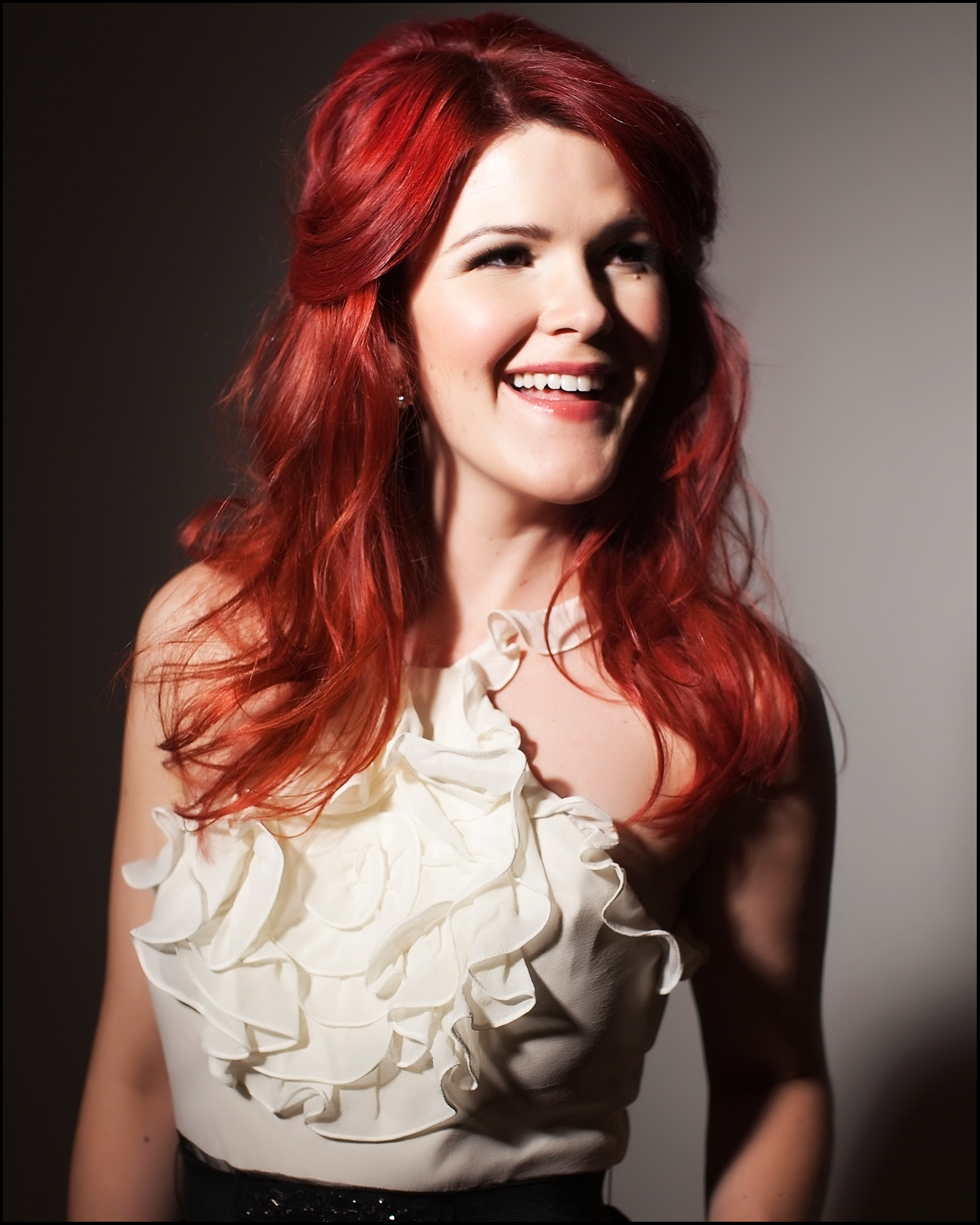
- Singer-Songwriter Delaney Gibson of the electropop duo, SIGNY

Background information
- Birth name: Jessica Delaney Gibson
- Born: Panama City, Florida, U.S.
- Genres: Singer-songwriter, pop, torch music, folk
- Instrument(s): Vocals, piano, guitar, ukulele, autoharp, harmonica, glockenspiel
- Years active: 2006–present
- Member of: Signy
- Website: www.delaneygibson.com

Delaney Gibson is an American singer-songwriter who has recorded four solo albums, The Worst Kind of Way, Hurricanes and Forget Me Nots, "It's Exploding", and Tall Like the Tree. Her song "La Di Da" was placed in the long running MTV show The Real World D.C. and the Oxygen Network's The Bad Girls Club. She currently lives in Austin, Texas, and tours year round from coast to coast, with emphasis in New York City and the Ventura and Los Angeles areas of California. Gibson joined Wheatus on their UK tour in September 2011, and she released her latest album, Tall Like the Tree, in early 2014. Delaney Gibson is now half of the electropop duo, SIGNY.

== Early life ==
Jessica Delaney Gibson was born in Panama City, Florida. At young age her family moved to Ventura, California, where her schooling and musical ambitions took root. She attended a parochial pre-school and by the age of five she was aimed at singing when she performed the Dolly Parton song "Coat of Many Colors". Gibson studied classical music and opera from the age of nine. With voice coaching from Linda Ottsen of the Ventura College music department and later a Bachelor of Arts degree in music, classical vocal performance from California State University, Northridge, the foundations were laid for the singer she is today.

One of her favorite quotes is Ralph Waldo Emerson's "Every wall is a door". When asked in 2008 by a local newspaper about role models, Gibson replied, "I love the story about Colonel Sanders going door-to-door selling his chicken recipe, until he found the person who believed in him enough to help promote his product."

== Career ==
Gibson has shared the stage with Barbra Streisand, Andrea Bocelli and Barry Manilow and, in 2007, she was chosen for the Sedona Jam Emerging Artists Music Festival in Sedona, Arizona. Her self-produced 6-song EP, Cruel and Beautiful, had favorable reviews and was featured on the cover of the February 2007 Discmakers catalog. Later the same year, Delaney received her first Mavric award for the song "Push" in the category of alternative song of the year. By 2009, and with the release of The Worst Kind Of Way, her awards and nominations were mounting with two from the third annual Rockwired Reader's Poll Awards and ten nominations for the 2009 Mavric Awards.

Late in 2009, Gibson released her second album, Hurricanes and Forget Me Nots. In 2010, the song "La Di Da" was used in the hit show The Real World. She has performed on the Fox TV show Boston Public as a singer and dancer and on MTV's My Own, remaking Natasha Bedingfield's track, "These Words".

In June 2011, Gibson was chosen as one of two musicians to take part in IdeaJam, a collaboration between Katalyst (co-founded by Ashton Kutcher), Intel and Google/YouTube. The event brought together top minds in the music and technology industry, including Ian Rogers of TopSpin, Rachel Masters of Red Magnet Media, Pete Wentz, Nikki Costa and Scooter Braun. The live productions were released on August 12. In September and October 2011, she toured with Wheatus, Math the Band and City Stereo as one of Wheatus' backing singers (the other being Gabrielle Aimée) on their tour of the UK, finishing in Inverness, Scotland, on October 16.

Tall Like the Tree, Gibson's third album, was released on January 28, 2014. Her song "Lions" won the "Best Official Music Video" at the 2013 Los Angeles Music Critic Awards. A European tour was scheduled for late in 2014.

In 2015, Delaney joined forces with fellow singer-songwriter Amy Arani to start SIGNY. They are a female fronted electropop duo based in Austin, Texas. SIGNY was signed to independent label Alliance in 2016. Their debut album, Water, was set for release in 2018.

== Discography ==
=== Albums ===
Year	Album	Information
2008	The Worst Kind of Way	Produced by Andrew Synowiec and Jesse Siebenberg, of Supertramp
2010	Hurricanes and Forget Me Nots	Produced by Chris Jay and Aaron Goldberg of Army of Freshmen
2014	Tall Like the Tree	Produced by Joshua Bartholomew

== Awards and accolades ==
- Great American Song Contest 'Top 5 Pop' winner for La Di Da.
- Five time MAVRIC Music Award winner.
- Voted Best Musician in Ventura County 2008 in the Ventura County Reporter
- Placed 3rd for Vocalist of the World competition and performed live on the BBC for the Llangollen International Musical Eisteddfod in Wales.
- Best Official Music Video at the 2013 Los Angeles Music Critic Awards.
