= 22 Jump Street (soundtrack) =

2014 film soundtrack

22 Jump Street is a 2014 buddy cop film directed by Phil Lord and Christopher Miller, and starred Jonah Hill and Channing Tatum in the lead roles, serving as the sequel to the 2012 film 21 Jump Street. Two soundtracks were released for the film: 22 Jump Street (Original Motion Picture Soundtrack) is the soundtrack album, released by Republic Records on June 10, 2014 and contains licensed songs featured in the film, and is the first in the franchise to have a soundtrack release, unlike its predecessor. 22 Jump Street (Original Motion Picture Score) is the second album that consisted of score composed by Mark Mothersbaugh released along with the predecessor's score in September 2014.

== 22 Jump Street (Original Motion Picture Soundtrack) ==
22 Jump Street (Original Motion Picture Soundtrack)

Soundtrack album by Various artists
- Released: June 10, 2014
- Genre: Rock; pop; electronic dance music
- Length: 48:01
- Label: Republic

Singles from 22 Jump Street (Original Motion Picture Soundtrack)
- 1. "22 Jump Street (Main Title Theme)" Released: June 3, 2014

The soundtrack features music by Wiz Khalifa, Duck Sauce, Tiësto, Steve Aoki, Diplo, Travis Barker and also previously unreleased material from the artist's collection. The album was preceded by the lead single, the film's main title theme performed by Angel Haze and Ludacris, released on June 3, 2014. The album was digitally released on June 10, 2014 by Republic Records and in physical formats two weeks later.

=== Track listing ===
No.	Title	Artist(s)	Length
1.	"Work Hard, Play Hard"	Wiz Khalifa	3:36
2.	"NRG (Skrillex, Kill the Noise, Milo and Otis Remix)"	Duck Sauce	4:12
3.	"Get Up (Rattle)"	Bingo Players feat. Far East Movement	2:46
4.	"Wasted"	Tiësto featuring Matthew Koma	3:08
5.	"Can't You See"	Shermanology & GRX	4:49
6.	"Models and Bottles"	Blind Scuba Divers	3:32
7.	"Check My Steezo"	Blind Scuba Divers	3:17
8.	"TTU (Too Turnt Up)"	Flosstradamus feat. Waka Flocka Flame	4:00
9.	"I Own It"	Nacey feat. Angel Haze	3:09
10.	"Express Yourself"	Diplo feat. Nicky da B	4:37
11.	"Freak"	Steve Aoki, Diplo and Deorro featuring Steve Bays	4:38
12.	"22 Jump Street (Theme from the Motion Picture)"	Angel Haze featuring Ludacris	2:58
13.	"Live Forever"	Travis Barker feat. Juicy J and Liz	3:15

=== Charts ===
Chart (2014)	Peak position
UK Soundtrack Albums (OCC)	5
US Billboard 200	129
US (Billboard)	4
US Soundtrack Albums (Billboard)	6

== 22 Jump Street (Original Motion Picture Score) ==
22 Jump Street (Original Motion Picture Score)

Film score by Mark Mothersbaugh
- Released: September 23, 2014 (double CD) November 4, 2014 (standalone)
- Recorded: 2014
- Studio: Sony Scoring Stage, Sony Pictures Studios, California
- Genre: Film score
- Length: 50:01
- Label: La-La Land Records; Madison Gate Records

Mark Mothersbaugh chronology
The Lego Movie (2014)	22 Jump Street (2014)	Pitch Perfect 2 (2015)

=== Background ===
Lord and Miller's frequent collaborator Mark Mothersbaugh composed the film's music. He started working on the basic sketches of the character's themes during the beginning of February 2014, and scoring for the film began by that month end. He wanted to lean heavier on electronic music as he did for the predecessor, while revisiting some of the themes and creating new themes. He initially wrote a "break up" theme for the two main characters.

His score was published by La-La Land Records on September 23, 2014. It was published on a double disc album limited to 2,000 copies that includes score from the film as well as its predecessor 21 Jump Street, composed by Mothersbaugh as well. In digital releases, the standalone edition of the album was released on November 4, 2014 by Madison Gate Records.

=== Track listing ===
No.	Title	Length
1.	"Previously on Jump Street"	1:55
2.	"Introducing Ghost"	3:23
3.	"Truck Gunfight"	2:29
4.	"22 Jump Street"	1:19
5.	"The Case"	0:49
6.	"Connecting to Zook"	1:09
7.	"Jenko’s Dream"	1:15
8.	"Schmidt's Walk of Shame"	1:22
9.	"Infiltrating the Frat House"	3:53
10.	"Olympic Hazing Games"	2:28
11.	"The Breakup"	1:48
12.	"Separation"	0:34
13.	"Trail to the Library"	2:39
14.	"Confronting Zook"	1:20
15.	"Golf Cart Chase"	3:36
16.	"End of a Relationship"	1:49
17.	"Reunited / Spring Break"	2:21
18.	"Lambo Chase"	1:34
19.	"Girl Fight / Beach Fight"	3:18
20.	"Dirty Shot"	2:21
21.	"Schmidt Saves Jenko"	4:08
22.	"End Credits"	3:16
Total length:		50:01

=== Credits ===
Credits adapted from CD liner notes.

Album Credits

- All music composed and produced by: Mark Mothersbaugh
- Music editors: Andy Dorfman, Katie Greathouse
- Recording: Brad Haehnel, Mutato Muzika
- Mixing: Brad Haehnel
- Mixing assistant: John Aspinall
- Mastering: James Nelson
- Music preparation: JoAnn Kane Music Services
- Music librarian: Mark Graham
- Soundtrack executive producer: Neal Moritz
- Executive in charge of music for Sony Pictures: Lia Vollack
- Executive producers for La-La Land Records: MV Gerhard and Matthew Verboys
- Art Direction: Dan Goldwasser at Warm Butter Design

Performer Credits

- Conductor: James T. Sale
- Contractor: Peter Rotter
- Concertmaster: Bruce Dukov
- Violins: Mark Robertson, Mark Berrow, Rebecca Bunnell, Darius Campo, Roberto Cani, Kevin Connolly, Nina Evtuhov, Lorenz Gamma, Julie Ann Gigante, Jessica Guideri, Tamara Hatwan, Amy Hershberger, Maia Jasper, Aimee Kreston, Ana Landauer, Songa Lee, Natalie Leggett, Dimitrie Leivici, Phillip Levy, Helen Nightengale, Grace E. Oh, Alyssa Park, Sara Parkins, Katia Popov, Rafael Rishik, Jay Rosen, Neil Samples, Marc Sazer, Lisa Sutton, Sarah Thornblade, Josefina Vergara, Irina Voloshina, Roger Wilkie
- Violas: Brian Dembow, Rachel Bolt, Robert Brophy, Thomas Diener, Andrew Duckles, Alma Fernandez, Matthew Funes, Keith Greene, Jennie Hansen, Pamela Jacobson, Roland Kato, Shawn Mann, Darrin McCann, Victoria Miskolczy, David Walther, Bruce White
- Cellos: Steve Erdody, Erika Duke-Kirkpatrick, Vanessa Freebairn-Smith, Trevor Handy, Paula Hochhalter, Paul Kegg, Armen Ksajikian, Timothy Landauer, George Kim Scholes, Andrew Shulman, Christina Soule, Cecilia Tsan, John Walz, Jonathan Williams
- Bass: Michael Valerio, Nico Carmine Abondolo, Drew Dembowski, Stephen Dress, Oscar Hidalgo, Christian Kollgaard, Edward Meares, Bruce Morgenthaler, Susan Ranney
- Sax: Daniel Higgins
- French horns: James Thatcher, Mark Adams, Steven Becknell, Dylan Hart, Daniel Kelley, Jenny Kim, Danielle Ondarza
- Trumpets: David Washburn, Wayne Bergeron, Jon Lewis, Daniel Rosenboom
- Trombones: William Booth, Alexander Iles, Andrew Thomas Malloy, William Reichenbach
- Tuba: Doug Tornquist
- Guitar: John E. Enroth
- Percussion: Donald Williams, James T. Sale
- Orchestrators: James T. Sale, Christopher Guardino, Jeff Schindler
