= Everything Is Awesome =

2014 single by Tegan and Sara featuring The Lonely Island

Single by Tegan and Sara featuring The Lonely Island

from the album The Lego Movie: Original Motion Picture Soundtrack
- Released: January 27, 2014
- Recorded: 2013
- Genre: Pop; pop rap; synth-pop
- Length: 2:43
- Label: WaterTower
- Songwriters: Shawn Patterson, JoLi, the Lonely Island
- Producers: Shawn Patterson, Mark Mothersbaugh, Bartholomew

Tegan and Sara singles chronology
| "Goodbye, Goodbye" (2013) | "Everything Is Awesome" (2014) | "Boyfriend" (2016) |

The Lonely Island singles chronology
| "Spell It Out" (2013) | "Everything Is Awesome" (2014) | "When Will the Bass Drop" (2014) |

"Everything Is Awesome" (stylized as "Everything Is AWESOME!!!") is a song by Canadian indie pop duo Tegan and Sara featuring American comedy trio the Lonely Island. The theme song to the 2014 Warner Bros. Pictures film The Lego Movie, it was written by Shawn Patterson, Joshua Bartholomew, Lisa Harriton, and the Lonely Island. The single and pop version featured in the end credits of the movie were produced by Mark Mothersbaugh.

The version of "Everything Is Awesome" featured in The Lego Movie and promotional material for the movie was produced by Joshua Bartholomew and performed by Bartholomew and Lisa Harriton.

On January 26, 2014, the song received its first US radio airplay via Anything Anything with Rich Russo on the WXPK, WRAT and WDHA radio stations.

== Music video ==
The music video features Lego versions of Tegan and Sara as well as the Lonely Island's Akiva Schaffer, Andy Samberg and Jorma Taccone. Parts of the video were made using brickfilming.

== Reception ==
=== Commercial performance ===
"Everything Is Awesome" debuted at No. 11 on the Dance/Electronic Songs chart, with 34,000 downloads in its first week. It also charted at No. 11 on the Irish charts, and peaked at No. 35 on the Canadian Hot 100. The song spent six consecutive weeks on the UK Singles and thirty-one on the UK Indie, peaking on both charts in early March at No. 17 and No. 2, respectively. In the US Billboard Hot 100, the song charted No. 57. The single had sold 418,000 copies in the United States by the end of June, 2014, and became Gold certified at the end of that year. On July 14, 2017, it was certified Platinum, having sold more than 1,000,000 units since its release.

=== Oscars performance ===
As one of the songs nominated for the Academy Award for Best Original Song, a large-scale musical performance of "Everything Is Awesome" took place at the 2015 awards ceremony. Tegan and Sara performed the song with the Lonely Island, musician and singer Mark Mothersbaugh of Devo (wearing a LEGO version of the Devo energy dome), DJ and drummer Questlove of The Roots, and actor Will Arnett, dressed as Batman, wearing the costume originally worn by Val Kilmer in the 1995 film Batman Forever. In the film, Arnett provides the voice of Batman and sings the mocking heavy metal composition "Untitled Self Portrait", an excerpt of which was incorporated into the performance of "Everything Is Awesome" at the Academy Awards.

== Awards and nominations ==
- Nominated for Best Original Song at the 87th Academy Awards
- Nominated for a Grammy Award for Best Song Written for Visual Media
- Nominated for a Critics' Choice Movie Award for Best Song
- 2014 Denver Film Critics Society for Best Original Song
- Nominated for a 2014 Georgia Film Critics Association for Best Original Song
- 2014 Hollywood Music In Media Award for Song - Animated Film
- 2014 Houston Film Critics Society for Best Original Song
- 2015 Talk Film Society Awards for Best Original Song
- 2014 Iowa Film Critics for Best Original Song
- Phoenix Film Critics Society Awards 2014 for Best Original Song
- Nominated for a Satellite Award for Best Original Song
- Variety Artisans Award

== Charts and certifications ==
=== Weekly charts ===
| Chart (2014) | Peak position |
|---|---|
| Australian ARIA Digital Track Chart | 23 |
| Canada Hot 100 (Billboard) | 35 |
| Ireland (IRMA) | 11 |
| New Zealand (Recorded Music NZ) | 24 |
| Scotland Singles (Official Charts) | 18 |
| UK Singles (Official Charts) | 17 |
| UK Indie (Official Charts) | 3 |
| US Billboard Hot 100 | 57 |
| US Comedy Digital Tracks (Billboard) | 2 |
| US Dance/Electronic Songs (Billboard) | 7 |
| US Heatseeker Songs (Billboard) | 2 |

=== Year-end ===
| Chart (2014) | Rank |
|---|---|
| US Dance/Electronic Songs (Billboard) | 28 |

=== Certifications ===
| Region | Certification | Certified units/sales |
|---|---|---|
| United Kingdom (BPI) | Silver | 200,000^{‡} |
| United States (RIAA) | Platinum | 1,000,000^{‡} |
^{‡} Sales+streaming figures based on certification alone.

== Legacy ==
- This song had been used in other works in the Lego franchise:
  - A version appears in The Lego Batman Movie, performed by Richard Cheese and Lounge Against the Machine.
  - In January 2019, the song was reused in a music video to promote The Lego Movie 2: The Second Part, whereas original characters and new characters were shown dancing to the song. A 360 degree version was also made.
  - A ukulele-driven "tween remix" with new verses by Garfunkel and Oates is featured in The Lego Movie 2: The Second Part.
  - Also in The Lego Movie 2, the characters sing a rather sad reprise of the song entitled "Everything's Not Awesome" at the falling point of the film.
  - The Forza Horizon 4 expansion Lego Speed Champions added an in-game radio station called Radio Awesome, which has "Everything Is Awesome" as its only song.
- In July 2014, the song was reused in a video by Greenpeace to promote their petition calling on The Lego Group to drop its partnership with Shell.
- In 2021, the Lego set Everyone Is Awesome was released in the colours of the LGBT rainbow flag, trans pride flag, and black and brown representing LGBT people of color. It was the first Lego set to represent the LGBT community.
- In 2024, the Lego set Retro Radio included a sound brick with one of the sound clips being a re-recorded version of "Everything Is Awesome" in an acoustic, country-inspired version
