= Brickfilm =

Type of animation using stop-motion

A brickfilm is a film or Internet video made either by shooting stop motion animation using construction set bricks like Lego bricks and minifigures or using computer-generated imagery or traditional animation to imitate the look. They can sometimes also be live action films featuring plastic construction toys (or representations of them). Since the 2000s The Lego Group has released various films and TV series and brickfilms have also become popular on social media websites. The term “brick film” was coined by Jason Rowoldt, founder of the website brickfilms.com.

== History ==
=== Early history; 1960s-2001 ===
While the technique has been used in official commercials dating back to the 1960s, the earliest known amateur brickfilm, En rejse til månen (Danish for 'Journey to the Moon'), was created in 1973 by Lars and Henrik Hassing for their grandparents' wedding anniversary. The six-minute video, which depicted a mission to space, was shown to Godtfred Kirk Christiansen, The Lego Group's owner at the time, who had a personal copy made and rewarded the creators with a tour of Lego's factory.

Another well-known early brickfilm, The Magic Portal, was produced from 1985 to 1989 by Lindsay Fleay in Australia. The film also combines Lego with live-action and claymation. Fleay sent the film to The Lego Group, who initially responded positively, but then responded by threatening legal action. As a result, it was ultimately not shown at any film festivals.

Jason Rowoldt, who coined the term brickfilm, founded Brickfilms.com in December 2000, described as "the internet's main hub for Lego filmmaking" during that time. That same year, Lego Studios was released. The main set came with a camera and software allowing people to make their own Lego movies with the sets.

=== 2000s–present ===
Throughout the 2000s, brickfilms increased in sophistication and garnered some media attention. Higher-end films would often feature digital effects, created frame-by-frame with image editors or inserted via video compositing software. In 2000, the brickfilm Rick & Steve: The Happiest Gay Couple in All the World was accepted to over 80 film festivals, including Sundance.

The Deluxe Edition DVD of Monty Python and the Holy Grail contained an extra in the form of a brickfilm of the "Camelot Song", produced by Spite Your Face Productions. Throughout the early 2000s, Spite Your Face Productions created several viral brickfilms in collaboration with The Lego Group, including The Han Solo Affair and The Peril of Doc Ock.

In 2005, Lego released the official computer-generated brickfilm Lego Star Wars: Revenge of the Brick to tie in with the release of Star Wars: Episode III – Revenge of the Sith. It premiered on Cartoon Network and was later included on the second DVD volume of the Star Wars: Clone Wars TV series.

In the mid-2000s, brickfilms became more widespread upon the rise of YouTube. In 2007, Lego hosted the Lego Star Wars Movie Making Contest, further publicizing brickfilms online.

In 2010, The Lego Group produced and released Lego's first official feature-length film, Lego: The Adventures of Clutch Powers. Since then, Lego has produced four more brickfilm-like feature films, The Lego Movie (2014), The Lego Batman Movie (2017), The Lego Ninjago Movie (2017), and The Lego Movie 2: The Second Part (2019). The Lego Group also produced multiple animated series for multiple franchises like Ninjago, Star Wars (e.g. Lego Star Wars: The Freemaker Adventures (2016–17), Friends or Legends of Chima (2013–14). While these are created using primarily computer generated animation, they are styled in such a way as to emulate the look of stop-motion brickfilms, even being influenced by some popular brickfilms such as The Magic Portal. Lego additionally also releases video games (e.g. Lego Star Wars: The Complete Saga (2007) featuring Lego bricks and minifigures.

In 2024, Lego and Universal Pictures released a brickfilm-style take on the theatrical trailer for the first of the two-part film adaptation of Wicked. Also in 2024, Focus Features released Piece by Piece, a story about Pharrell Williams' life, directed by Morgan Neville and made in the brickfilm style using Lego animation.

For years, almost all brickfilming was created using digital cameras and webcams. However, since the advent of stop-motion apps on mobile devices, brickfilming is accessible to many more people. After the release of The Lego Batman Movie, The Lego Group produced a stop-motion animation themed construction set which was compatible with smartphones and encouraged the art of brickfilming (853650).

== Technique ==
Modern brickfilms are captured with digital still cameras (sometimes in the form of webcams, DSLRs or camcorders with still image capability). The most widely used framerates for brickfilms are 12, 15, or 24 frames per second. Animators also tend to use a standard 4-frame minifigure walk cycle.

To capture images for the animation, most brickfilmers prefer to use dedicated stop motion software, such as the free Stop Motion Studio, Boats Animator, and Eagle Animation, or professional software such as Dragonframe. Afterwards, compositing software such as Adobe After Effects can be used to add visual effects and a video editor can be used to compile the frames with audio tracks and complete the production of the film.

== Franchises ==
The Lego Group produced various short films, feature films and video games featuring Lego minifigures and bricks. Most of these are based on other already existing franchises like Star Wars or DC Comics. These films are created using primarily computer generated animation, they are styled in such a way as to emulate the look of stop-motion brickfilms.

Multiple video games also feature Lego minifigures and bricks are inspired by brickfilms.

== Brickfilming communities and festivals ==
=== Communities ===
Brickfilms.com by Brick à Brack is an online community dedicated to brickfilming. Founded December 16, 2000 by Jason Rowoldt, Brickfilms.com was the first internet brickfilming community ever created. The website hosts a brickfilm directory, threads for filmmakers, technical articles, resources and organizes many brickfilm contests. In 2007 the site was the Internet's "main hub for Lego filmmaking", according to the Wall Street Journal.

Bricks in Motion is an online community focused on the art of brickfilming. It was originally founded in 2001 as the personal website of pioneering brickfilmer Thomas Foote, and the current incarnation was founded by Jonathan Schlaepfer in 2008 as a new community-focused brickfilming website, featuring a forum and later a film directory. Starting in 2008, it became the main home of the English-speaking brickfilming community at the time, following an exodus from Brickfilms.com. The current administrators are Chris Wynn and Sean Willis. It is one of the largest and most active online communities. Bricks in Motion annually hosts the two largest community-run brickfilming contests, the Twenty-Four-Hour-Animation Contest (abbreviated to THAC) and the Brickfilm Rapidly All Week Long contest (abbreviated to BRAWL).

Brickfilm Day is an online community known for its annual Brickfilm Day event, in which participants submit a brickfilm or a video about brickfilming, all to be released on one day. The first Brickfilm Day festival was in 2018, celebrating the 45th anniversary of En rejse til månen (Danish for Journey to the Moon). They have organized several brickfilm community projects, such as recreations of popular movie trailers and scenes. Brickfilm Day does not have a dedicated website, but does have a community on Discord.

=== Film festivals ===
There are multiple film festivals in the brickfilming community that are dedicated entirely to the screening of brickfilms, usually as part of a wider Lego convention. A few notable festivals are the Brickworld Film Festival, based in Chicago, Cine Brick, a Portugal-based brickfilming festival, and Steinerei, a German brickfilming festival.

== Documentary ==
In 2014, The owner of the Bricks In Motion website, Philip Heinrich, and his production company, Ergo Possum, started a Kickstarter campaign to crowdsource the funding of a feature-length movie, Bricks in Motion, a documentary that follows brickfilmers from around the world and showcases their diverse personalities and their love for the craft. It reached a total of $12,800 and started production in 2014. Production was completed in December 2015, and the film was released on various streaming services in 2017.
