= Ghost in the Shell (2017 soundtrack) =

2017 film soundtrack album

Ghost in the Shell (Music Inspired by the Motion Picture)

Soundtrack album by various artists
- Released: March 31, 2017
- Genres: Hip hop; techno; punk rock; alternative rock; electropop
- Length: 39:40
- Label: Paramount Music

Ghost in the Shell (Music Inspired by the Motion Picture) is the soundtrack album to the 2017 film Ghost in the Shell directed by Rupert Sanders, which is the first live-action movie based on the Japanese Ghost in the Shell franchise envisioned by Masamune Shirow, starring Scarlett Johansson, Takeshi Kitano, Michael Pitt, Pilou Asbæk, Chin Han and Juliette Binoche. The album featured music inspired by the film featuring a compilation of songs performed by a various artists and was released through Paramount Music on March 31, 2017. Preceding the album was the single "Escape" performed by Tricky which was released on March 16.

== Reception ==
Christopher Rivera of EDM Identity wrote "The songs flow from one another well though if I had been the studio I would have switched tracks 1 and 12. It is as the Japanese practice of Confucianism teaches us, "Pay respect to the past...". Have the OG before any remix, simple as that."

== Track listing ==
No.	Title	Artist(s)	Length
1.	"Utai IV: Reawakening" (Steve Aoki Remix)	Kenji Kawai	4:30
2.	"The Hacker"	Johnny Jewel	3:23
3.	"Cathryn's Peak"	Boys Noize	3:25
4.	"Scars"	DJ Shadow feat. Nils Frahm	3:35
5.	"Surge"	Above & Beyond	2:25
6.	"Aokigahara Forest"	Io Echo	4:22
7.	"Escape"	Tricky	3:05
8.	"Enjoy the Silence"	Ki Theory	4:17
9.	"Free Fall"	Johnny Jewel	0:36
10.	"Bed of Thorns"	Gary Numan	5:27
11.	"The Key"	Johnny Jewel	1:58
12.	"Utai IV: Reawakening"	Kenji Kawai	2:37
Total length:			39:40

== Original score ==
In November 2016, it was announced that Clint Mansell would provide the score for Ghost in the Shell. Afterwards, Lorne Balfe was further announced as the co-composer providing additional music. Initially, Lakeshore Records was announced to release the film score but due to reasons unknown, the score album's release was eventually put on hold, which prompted fans to sign numerous petitions to release the score online. Balfe then eventually self-released his version of the score in late 2017 featuring 20 tracks.

=== Reception ===
Brian Raftery of Wired described it a "gorgeous [...] score, pulsing and plinking like a Tangerine Dream nightmare". Guy Lodge of Variety wrote "Perhaps the only ones holding back are composers Clint Mansell and Lorne Balfe, whose stylish, techno-ominous score is mostly content to skulk in the background, only daring to reference Kenji Kawai's unshakeable theme for the 1995 film over the closing credits." Chris Edwards of The Guardian called it a "faith-inspiring score".

=== Track listing ===
No.	Title	Length
1.	"Shelling"	4:36
2.	"Alternative Shelling Sequence"	5:10
3.	"Major on Site"	1:18
4.	"Hanka Robotics"	1:14
5.	"Holographic Conference Room"	1:20
6.	"Glitch"	1:23
7.	"Deep Dive"	1:52
8.	"Lost"	2:09
9.	"Street Gun Fight"	1:05
10.	"Skinny Man Chase (Full Version)"	2:26
11.	"Kuze's Lair"	1:38
12.	"My Mind Is Human"	2:05
13.	"Arrested"	1:48
14.	"Confined"	2:13
15.	"What's Your Name"	1:48
16.	"Ambush"	2:20
17.	"Tank Battle"	3:41
18.	"I Give My Consent"	4:21
19.	"Motoko"	2:07
20.	"Reborn"	1:52
Total length:		46:26

=== Credits ===
Credits adapted from Hans Zimmer's website:

- Music by Clint Mansell & Lorne Balfe
- Additional Arrangements: Max Aruj & Steffen Thum
- Orchestrator: Oscar Senen
- Musician Contractors: Isobel Griffiths & Amy Stewart
- Air Studios Recording Engineer: Geoff Foster
- Technical Supervisor Synchron Stage & Chief Audio Engineer: Bernd Mazagg
- Synchron Stage ProTools Operator: Martin Weismayr
- Vienna Musicians Contractor: Christian Buchmann
- Japanese Choir Conductor: Taisei Iwasaka
- Japanese Musicians Contractor: Akihito Yoshikawa
- Traditional Japanese Musician Coordinator: Hidehiro Kawai
- Japanese Choir Recording Engineer: Hiroaki Sato
- Recording Studio: Avaco Studio 301
- Ambient Music Designer: Kevin Lamb
- Digital Instrument Design: Mark Wherry
- Music Mixed by John Chapman
- Music Mixed at Remote Control Productions
- Music Production Coordinator: Queenie Li
- Music Production Services: Steven Kofsky
