= Joshua Bartholomew =

Canadian musician (born 1984)

- Born: Joshua Bartholomew Ferber; July 30, 1984 (age 42); Pembroke, Ontario, Canada
- Genres: Rock, pop
- Occupations: Vocalist, singer-songwriter, musician, producer, mixer, recording engineer, composer
- Instruments: Vocals, guitar, drums, percussion, bass guitar, piano, mellotron
- Years active: 2005–present
- Website: www.bartholomewmusic.com

Joshua Bartholomew (born July 30, 1984), known mononymously as Bartholomew, is a Canadian singer-songwriter, multi-instrumentalist, and producer. He writes and records music with his wife Lisa Harriton under the moniker JoLi. Bartholomew is a co-writer and producer of the Grammy and Oscar nominated song "Everything Is Awesome" from The Lego Movie.

== Early life ==
Bartholomew was born in Pembroke, Ontario, and raised on military bases throughout Canada including CFB Petawawa, CFB Valcartier and CFB Borden. Bartholomew began singing at the age of three and cites his parents' extensive record collection as an early influence.

While attending Banting Memorial High School he was given permission to take co-op classes in his home studio where he began recording demos of his songs for school credit, playing all instruments himself. This role remains on most of Bartholomew's studio recordings.

== Music career ==
Bartholomew's self-titled debut EP was released in 2005. Two songs "What Happened To Our Love" and "IT" gained nationwide radio play on CBC Radio One. CBC Radio One producer Kai Black, CBC host Brent Bambury, singer-songwriter Ron Sexsmith and Relient K's Matt Thiessen were among early supporters. In 2006, Bartholomew won the songwriting contest held by Toronto's No. 1 Pop/AC radio station MIX 99.9 FM (CKFM-FM) and toured with Randy Bachman and Burton Cummings. Several labels responded favourably to his debut, but Bartholomew opted to forego a major label deal.

Bartholomew travelled extensively throughout 2006 to 2008 spending extended periods of time in New York City, Los Angeles and Nashville. Most of 2009 and 2010 was spent living in his Airstream trailer in Nashville, writing songs with pop and country artists including Grammy nominated country band Emerson Drive.

In 2008 Bartholomew self-released his first full length record, And So It Begins, a double album with 20 songs to critical acclaim, followed by Heart Headed, a 4 song EP released as a digital download in 2009.

In January 2011, in a video posted on his official website, Bartholomew stated his new record "is a little heavier than what you're used to hearing" and that he had begun working on his new album with several collaborators including: Dave Kushner (Velvet Revolver), Chris Thorn (Blind Melon), Warren Huart (Aerosmith) and Billy Mohler (Smashing Pumpkins). He also announced he was shortening his name from Joshua Bartholomew to Bartholomew. On January 25, 2011, the Joshua Bartholomew Facebook fan page changed to Bartholomew.

== Musical style and influence ==
Bartholomew is a self-professed Beatles and Led Zeppelin fanatic and has cited Magical Mystery Tour and Led Zeppelin as his favorite albums. In 2006, Bartholomew opened for two of his musical heroes Ron Sexsmith and Bachman-Cummings.

Bartholomew states that The Beatles played a major part in his childhood and considers them to be "the greatest band of all time." Bartholomew has also named producer, Dave Sardy as his most important modern production influence.

== Film and television ==
In 2013, Bartholomew was cast as musician "Moocher" in Cinnamon Girl: California Dreamin', an original drama series set in the 1960s Laurel Canyon music scene, but the Lifetime network passed on the pilot.

== Discography ==
Year	Artist	Album	Song(s)	Notes
2005	Joshua Bartholomew	Self-titled	All songs	Musician, songwriter, producer
2008	Joshua Bartholomew	And So It Begins	All songs	Musician, songwriter, producer
2009	Joshua Bartholomew	Heart Headed	All songs	Musician, songwriter, producer
2009	Delaney Gibson	Hurricanes & Forget Me Nots	Rain Or Shine	Songwriter, Vocals
2011	Emerson Drive	Decade of Drive	Let Your Love Speak	Songwriter
2012	Esthero	Everything Is Expensive	Over	Musician, songwriter, producer
2014	Delaney Gibson	Tall Like The Tree		Musician, songwriter, Producer
2014	JoLi – Joshua Bartholomew and Lisa Harriton	The Lego Movie: Original Motion Picture Soundtrack	Everything Is Awesome	Musician, songwriter, Producer
2014	Tegan and Sara feat. The Lonely Island	The Lego Movie: Original Motion Picture Soundtrack	Everything Is Awesome Remix	Musician, songwriter

== Awards and nominations ==
=== "Everything Is Awesome" awards and nominations ===
- Nominated for Best Original Song at the 87th Academy Awards
- Nominated for a Grammy Award for Best Song Written for Visual Media
- Nominated for a Critics' Choice Movie Award for Best Song
- Nominated for a 2014 Georgia Film Critics Association for Best Original Song
- Nominated for a Satellite Award for Best Original Song
- Nominated for an Awards Circuit Community Award Best Original Song
- 2014 Denver Film Critics Society for Best Original Song
- 2014 Hollywood Music in Media Award for Song – Animated Film
- 2014 Houston Film Critics Society for Best Original Song
- 2014 Iowa Film Critics for Best Original Song
- 2014 Phoenix Film Critics Society Awards for Best Original Song
- 2015 Talk Film Society Awards for Best Original Song
- Variety Artisans Award
