= The Lego Movie =

2014 film by Phil Lord and Christopher Miller

- Theatrical release poster
- Directed by: Phil Lord; Christopher Miller
- Screenplay by: Phil Lord; Christopher Miller
- Story by: Dan Hageman; Kevin Hageman; Phil Lord; Christopher Miller
- Based on: Lego Construction Toys
- Produced by: Dan Lin; Roy Lee
- Starring: Chris Pratt; Will Ferrell; Elizabeth Banks; Will Arnett; Nick Offerman; Alison Brie; Charlie Day; Liam Neeson; Morgan Freeman
- Cinematography: Pablo Plaisted (Note: Barry Peterson shot the live-action sequences.)
- Edited by: David Burrows; Chris McKay
- Music by: Mark Mothersbaugh
- Production companies: Warner Animation Group; Village Roadshow Pictures; RatPac-Dune Entertainment; Vertigo Entertainment; Lin Pictures; The Lego Group; Animal Logic
- Distributed by: Warner Bros. Pictures (Worldwide); Roadshow Films (Australia)
- Release dates: 1 February 2014 (Regency Village Theater); 6 February 2014 (Denmark); 7 February 2014 (United States); 3 April 2014 (Australia)
- Running time: 101 minutes
- Countries: United States; Australia; Denmark
- Language: English
- Budget: $60–65 million
- Box office: $470.8 million

The Lego Movie is a 2014 animated adventure comedy film written and directed by Phil Lord and Christopher Miller. Based on the Lego line of construction toys, the film stars the voices of Chris Pratt, Will Ferrell, Elizabeth Banks, Will Arnett, Nick Offerman, Alison Brie, Charlie Day, Liam Neeson and Morgan Freeman. The story focuses on Emmet Brickowski (Pratt), an ordinary Lego minifigure who is believed to be "the Special" and destined to help a resistance movement stop a tyrannical businessman (Ferrell) from gluing everything in the Lego universe into his vision of perfection.

Plans of a feature film based on Lego started in 2008 after a discussion between producers Dan Lin and Roy Lee before Lin left Warner Bros. to form his own production company, Lin Pictures. By August 2009, it was announced that Dan and Kevin Hageman had begun writing the script. It was officially green-lit by Warner Bros. in November 2011 with a planned 2014 release date. Chris McKay was brought in to co-direct in 2011 with Lord and Miller and later became the film's animation supervisor.

The film was inspired by the visual aesthetic and stylistics of brickfilms and qualities attributed to Lego Studios sets. While Lord and Miller wanted to make the film's animation replicate stop motion, everything was done through computer animation, with the animation rigs following the same articulation limits actual Lego figures have. Much of the cast signed on to voice the characters in 2012, including Pratt, Ferrell, Banks, Arnett, Freeman and Brie, while the animation was provided by Animal Logic, which was expected to comprise 80% of the film. The film was dedicated to Kathleen Fleming, the former director of entertainment development of the Lego company, who had died in Cancún, Mexico, in April 2013.

The Lego Movie premiered in Los Angeles on 1 February 2014, and was released theatrically in the United States on 7 February. It became a critical and commercial success, grossing $470.8 million worldwide against its $60–65 million budget and received acclaim for its animation, writing, story, humor, score and voice acting. The National Board of Review named The Lego Movie one of the top-ten films of 2014. It received a nomination for Best Original Song at the 87th Academy Awards, among numerous other accolades. The Lego Movie is the first entry in what became the franchise of the same name, which includes three more films—The Lego Batman Movie, The Lego Ninjago Movie (both 2017) and The Lego Movie 2: The Second Part (2019). It has since been recognized as one of the greatest animated films of all time. (Note: Attributed to multiple references:)

== Plot ==
In a Lego universe, a wizard named Vitruvius fails to protect a superweapon called the Kragle—a tube of Krazy Glue—from the maniacal Lord Business, who blinds him in the process. Vitruvius prophesies that someone called "the Special" will find the Piece of Resistance, an item capable of stopping the Kragle.

Eight and a half years later, in Bricksburg, optimistic but unimaginative construction worker Emmet Brickowski falls into a pit and finds the Piece of Resistance. Compelled to touch it, he experiences visions, including one of a being dubbed "The Man Upstairs", and passes out. He awakens in the custody of Business' lieutenant Bad Cop and discovers that the Piece of Resistance is stuck to his back. Emmet learns of Business' plans to freeze the world with the Kragle; the Piece of Resistance is the tube's cap. A mysterious woman named Wyldstyle rescues Emmet, believing him to be the Special. They escape Bad Cop and travel to "The Old West", where they rendezvous with Vitruvius. He and Wyldstyle are Master Builders—beings capable of building anything without instruction manuals—who oppose Business' attempts to suppress their creativity. Though disappointed that Emmet is not a Master Builder, they are convinced of his potential when he recalls visions of the Man Upstairs.

The trio evade Business' forces with the help of Wyldstyle's boyfriend Batman and escape to "Cloud Cuckoo Land", which serves as the Master Builders' refuge. Following Emmet's confession about not being a Master Builder, everyone is unimpressed with and reject him. Soon after, Business' forces attack and capture everyone except Emmet's group and fellow Master Builders MetalBeard, Unikitty and Benny. After saving the group with his double-decker couch invention, Emmet devises a plan to infiltrate Business' headquarters and disarm the Kragle. It nearly succeeds until the group is captured and imprisoned as Business murders Vitruvius and throws the Piece of Resistance into an abyss before arming a device to electrocute the captured Master Builders. Before he dies, Vitruvius reveals he made up the prophecy, but his spirit returns to tell Emmet that his self-belief makes him the Special. Strapped to the mechanism's battery, Emmet drops himself off the edge of the tower and into the abyss on the edge of the universe, disarming the device and saving everyone. Inspired by Emmet's sacrifice, Wyldstyle, who earlier revealed to Emmet that her real name is Lucy, rallies the people across the universe to embrace their own creativity to oppose Business.

The abyss transports Emmet to real life, where current events are being played out in a basement by a boy named Finn on his father's Lego collection. The father, revealed to be the Man Upstairs, chastises his son for creating hodgepodges of different playsets and begins to glue his creations back into place. Realizing the danger, Emmet wills himself to move and gains Finn's attention, who returns him and the Piece of Resistance to Bricksburg and confronts Business with newfound Master Builder abilities. Meanwhile, Finn's father notices his son's creations and realizes he is suppressing his creativity. Through a speech from Emmet to Business, Finn tells his father that he is special and can still do the right thing. The duo then reconcile, which plays out as Business reforming, capping the Kragle with the Piece of Resistance and reversing its effects with mineral spirits. Following this, Lucy and Emmet enter a relationship with Batman's blessing. Finn's father grants Finn and his younger sister permission to play with the Lego sets, leading to Duplo aliens invading the Lego universe.

== Cast ==
- Chris Pratt as Emmet Brickowski, an everyman and construction worker from Bricksburg who becomes the Special.
- Will Ferrell as Lord Business, an evil and businessman-based tyrant of Bricksburg and the Lego universe, who is the company president of the Octan Corporation under the alias President Business
  - Ferrell also portrays "The Man Upstairs", an obsessive Lego collector in the live-action scenes.
- Will Arnett as Bruce Wayne / Batman, a DC Comics character who is one of the Master Builders, as well as Wyldstyle's boyfriend and an amateur musician
- Morgan Freeman as Vitruvius, a blind and elderly wizard who is the leader of the Master Builders and Emmet's mentor
- Elizabeth Banks as Lucy / Wyldstyle, a "tough as nails" and tech-savvy Master Builder and Emmet's love interest
- Nick Offerman as MetalBeard, a pirate Master Builder who seeks revenge on Lord Business for disassembling his body following an earlier encounter and forcing him to create a new body from scratch
- Alison Brie as Princess Unikitty, a unicorn-cat hybrid Master Builder and the ruler of Cloud Cuckoo Land
- Charlie Day as Benny, a "1980-something space guy" Master Builder who is obsessed with building spaceships. The character is based on minifigures from the line of Lego Space sets sold in the 1980s and his character design includes a broken chin strap on his helmet, a common defect of said sets at that time.
- Liam Neeson as Bad Cop / Good Cop, a police officer with a two-sided head and a split personality who serves Lord Business as the commander of the Super Secret Police. The character's name and personality are based on the good cop, bad cop interrogation method.
  - Neeson also voices Pa Cop, a police officer who is Bad Cop's father.
- Melissa Sturm as Ma Cop, Bad Cop's mother, and Gail, a construction worker
- Channing Tatum as Superman, a DC Comics character who is one of the Master Builders
- Jonah Hill as Green Lantern, a DC Comics character who is one of the Master Builders
- Cobie Smulders as Wonder Woman, a DC Comics character who is one of the Master Builders
- Jadon Sand as Finn, a young boy who is the son of "The Man Upstairs" in the live-action scenes

Additionally, Anthony Daniels, Keith Ferguson and Billy Dee Williams appear as C-3PO, Han Solo and Lando Calrissian from the Star Wars franchise. (Note: Attributed to multiple references:) Other appearances from licensed Lego iterations of franchises include Gandalf from the Lord of the Rings and the Hobbit franchises; Dumbledore from the Harry Potter franchise; The Flash and Aquaman from DC Comics; Milhouse Van Houten from The Simpsons; Michelangelo from the Teenage Mutant Ninja Turtles franchise and Speed Racer from the Lego tie-in sets released alongside the 2008 film adaptation of the eponymous animated television series.

Shaquille O'Neal portrays a Lego version of himself as a Master Builder alongside two generic members of the 2002 NBA All-Stars. Will Forte (credited as Orville Forte) portrays Abraham Lincoln (whom he had previously voiced on Clone High, another Lord/Miller production). Dave Franco, Jake Johnson and Keegan-Michael Key portray Emmet's co-workers Wally, Barry and Foreman Jim, respectively. Director Christopher Miller voices an announcer for the Octan comedy television series Where Are My Pants?; his son Graham Miller voices a Duplo alien.

== Production ==
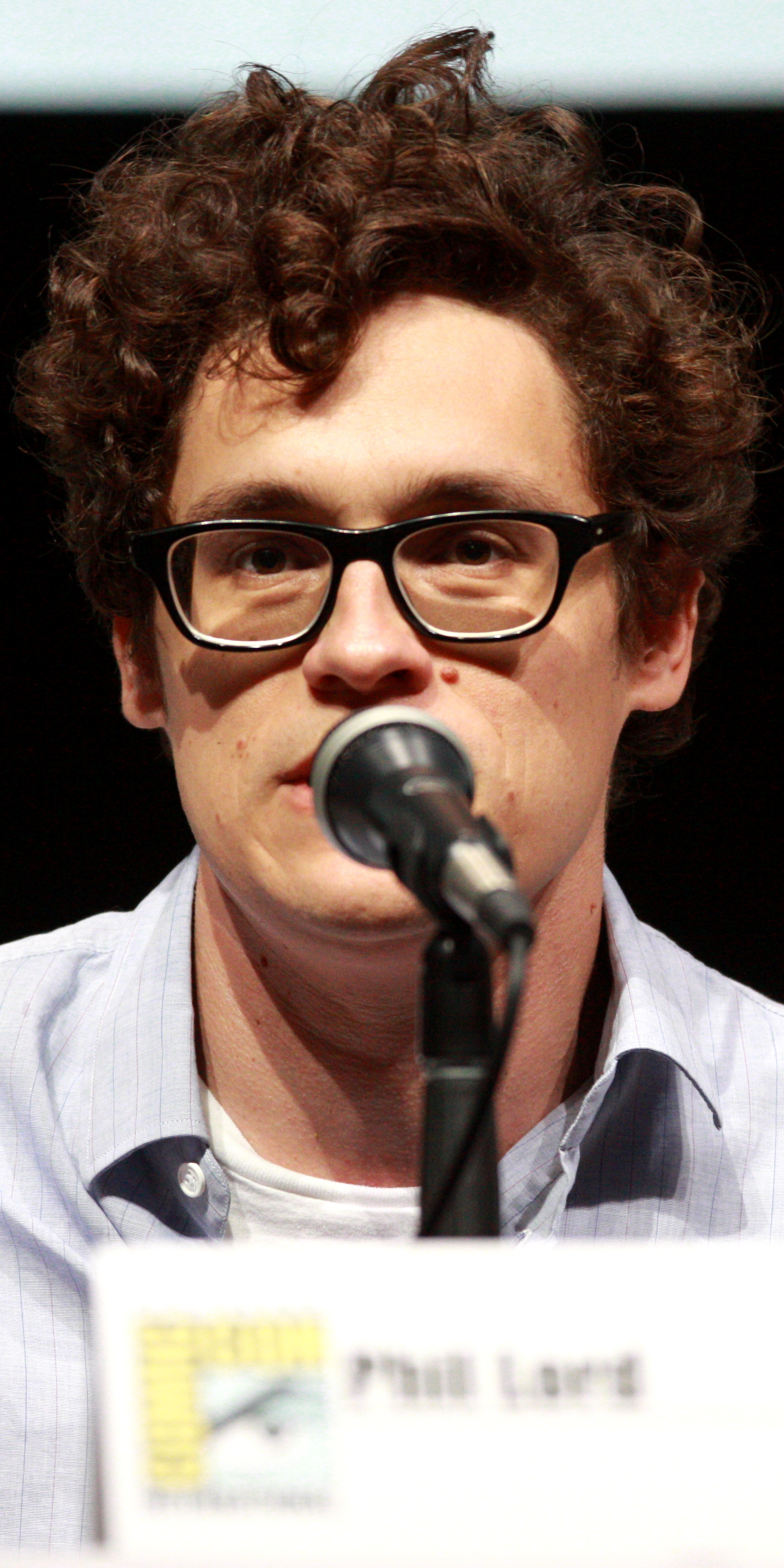
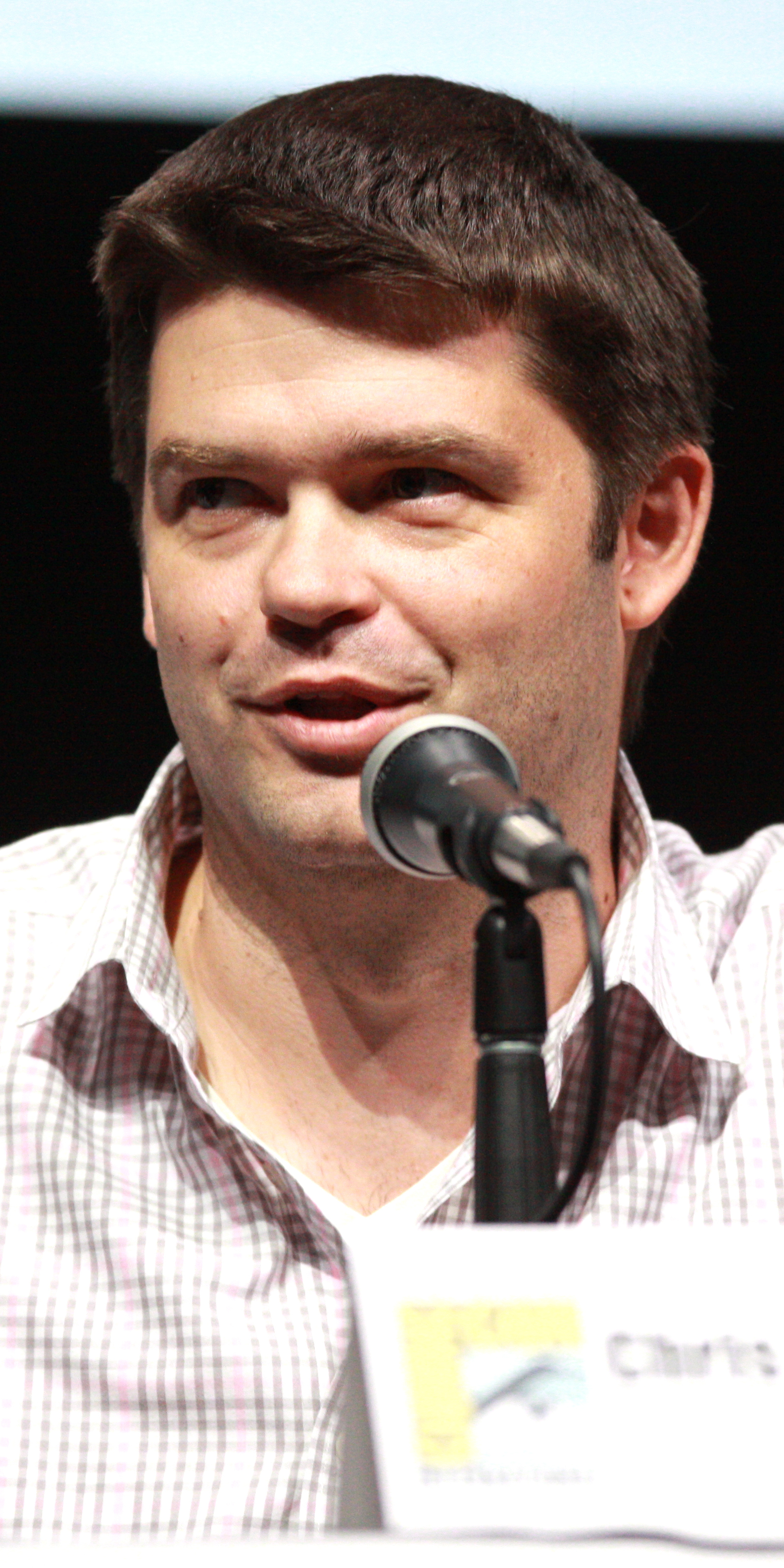
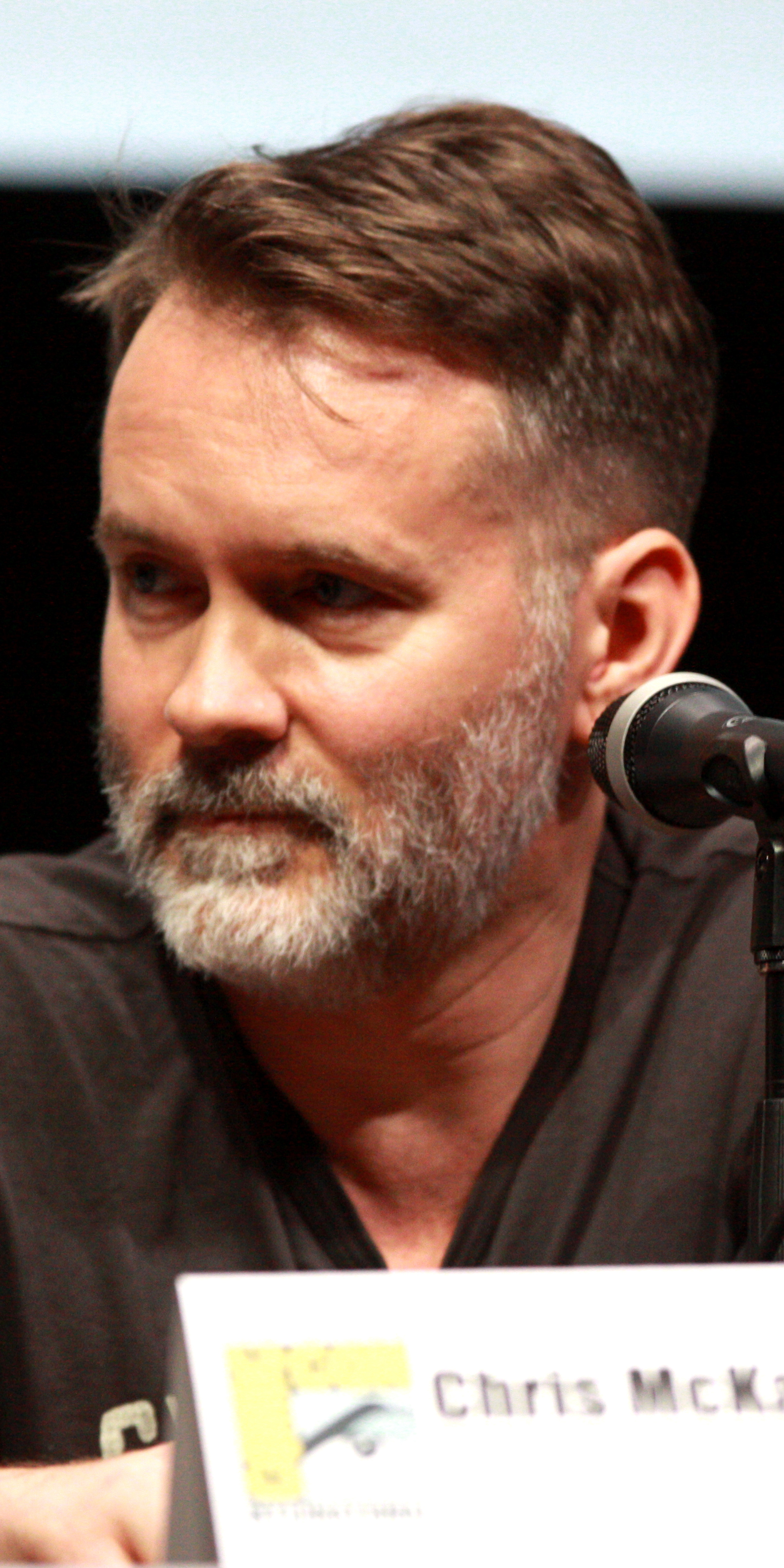
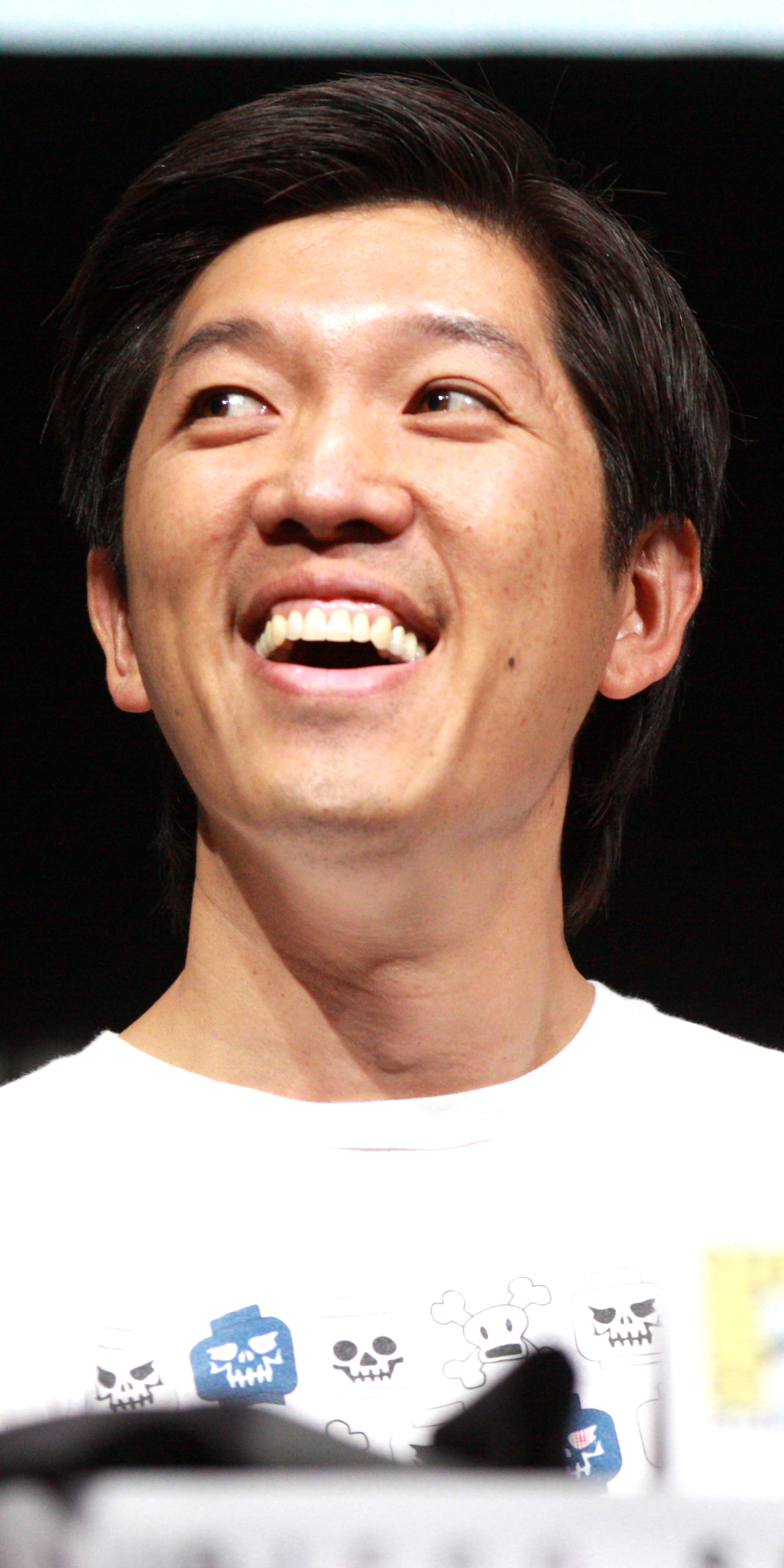
Creators of the film at the 2013 San Diego Comic-Con: Phil Lord and Christopher Miller, writers and directors; Chris McKay, co-director and editor; and Dan Lin, producer.

=== Development ===
The development of The Lego Movie began in 2008, when Dan Lin and Roy Lee discussed it before Lin left Warner Bros. Pictures to form his own production company, Lin Pictures. Warner Bros. executive Kevin Tsujihara, who had recognized the value of the Lego franchise by engineering the studio's purchase of Lego video game licensee Traveller's Tales in 2007, thought the success of the Lego-based video games indicated a Lego-based film was a good idea, and reportedly "championed" the development of the film.

By August 2009, Dan and Kevin Hageman were writing the script described as "action adventure set in a Lego world". In 2008, Lin visited The Lego Group's headquarters in Denmark to pitch his vision for the film, later remarking uncertainty among executives. "They weren't rude or anything […] but they didn't feel they needed a movie. They were already a very successful brand. Why take the risk?" Nevertheless, Lego's vice president of licensing and entertainment Jill Wilfert responded positively to the Hagemans' treatment that Lin pitched. "Once we heard the pitch, how Dan felt he could bring the values of the brand to life, we started to think, 'This could be interesting.'"

In June 2010, Cloudy with a Chance of Meatballs (2009) writers and directors Phil Lord and Christopher Miller were in talks to write and direct the film. Warner Bros. green-lit the film by November 2011, with a planned 2014 release date. Australian studio Animal Logic, who did the animation for previous Warner Bros. released animated films such as Happy Feet and Legend of the Guardians: The Owls of Ga'Hoole, was contracted to provide the animation, which was expected to comprise 80% of the film. By this time, animator Chris McKay, one of the directors, producers, and editors of Robot Chicken and Moral Orel, had joined Lord and Miller to co-direct. McKay explained that his role was to supervise the production in Australia once Lord and Miller temporarily left production to work on 22 Jump Street (2014). In March 2012, Lord and Miller revealed the film's working title, Lego: The Piece of Resistance, and a storyline.

"We wanted to make the film feel like the way you play, the way I remember playing. We wanted to make it feel as epic and ambitious and self-serious as a kid feels when they play with LEGO. We took something you could claim is the most cynical cash grab in cinematic history, basically a 90 minute [sic] LEGO commercial, and turned it into a celebration of creativity, fun and invention, in the spirit of just having a good time and how ridiculous it can look when you make things up. And we had fun doing it.'"

— Animation supervisor Chris McKay

=== Casting ===
By June 2012, Chris Pratt had been cast as the voice of Emmet, the lead Lego character, and Will Arnett voicing a Lego version of Batman; the role of Lego Superman was offered to Channing Tatum. By August 2012, Elizabeth Banks was hired to voice Lucy (later getting the alias "Wyldstyle") and Morgan Freeman to voice Vitruvius, an old mystic. In November 2012, Alison Brie, Will Ferrell, Liam Neeson and Nick Offerman signed on for roles. Ferrell voices the main antagonist President/Lord Business; Neeson voices Bad Cop/Good Cop, Business' right-hand man; Brie voices Princess Unikitty, cat-unicorn hybrid and a member of Emmet's team; and Offerman voices Metalbeard, a pirate and another member of Emmet's team who seeks revenge on Business.

Warner Bros. already owns the film rights to intellectual properties from which key characters appear in the film (i.e. DC Comics; Wizarding World), but the filmmakers still ran their depictions by other creatives; this included Christopher Nolan and Zack Snyder, who were respectively directing The Dark Knight Rises (2012) and Man of Steel (2013) at the time of the film's production, as well as Harry Potter creator J.K. Rowling. Lord recalled that Superman was omitted for an extended period of time due to a lawsuit against Warner Bros. by the heirs of co-creator Jerry Siegel, before being reinserted at the last minute. The film also features Billy Dee Williams and Anthony Daniels reprising their roles as Lego iterations of their Star Wars characters Lando Calrissian and C-3PO respectively from the original movies while Keith Ferguson reprises his role as a Lego version of Han Solo from Robot Chicken, replacing original actor Harrison Ford. Lin recalled the closure of their deal to feature the characters as hectic, as The Walt Disney Company announced their purchase of Lucasfilm a few weeks after the filmmakers had traveled there and received permission to include them.

=== Animation ===
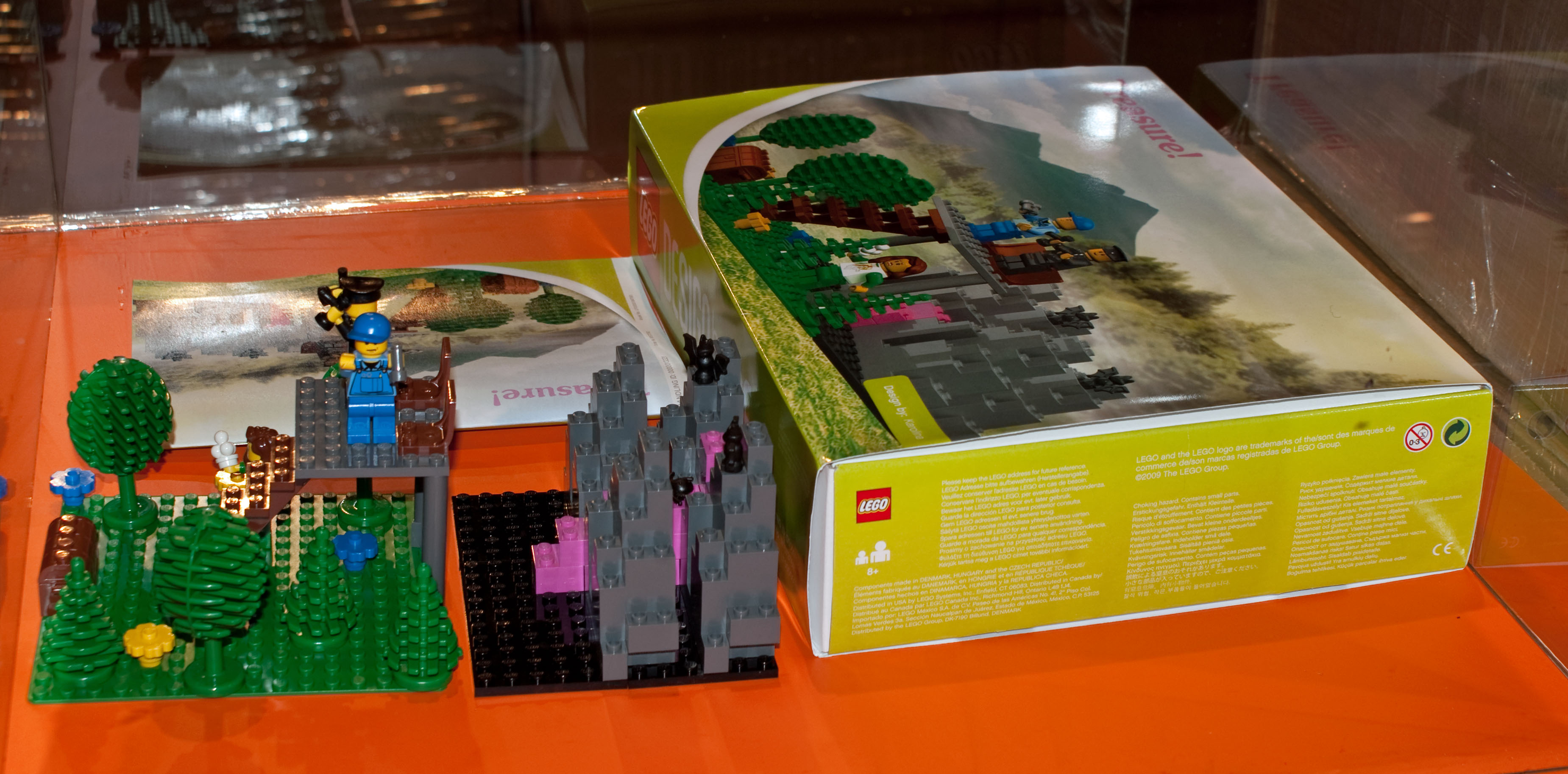
LEGO Design byME set designed with Lego Digital Designer, the same software used to create The Lego Movie

The Lego Movie was strongly inspired by the visual aesthetic and stylistics of Brickfilms and qualities attributed to Lego Studios sets. The film received a great deal of praise in the respective online communities from filmmakers and fans, who saw the film as an appraising nod to their work. In the film's live-action segment, Finn returns Emmet to the Lego world via an arts-and-crafts-covered tube labeled "Magic Portal", which production designer Grant Freckleton confirmed was a direct reference to Australian filmmaker Lindsay Fleay's 1989 animated short film The Magic Portal, which similarly incorporated live-action segments. Fleay went on to work at Animal Logic, though he left before production on The Lego Movie began.

Animal Logic tried to make the film's animation replicate a stop motion film although everything was done through computer graphics, with the animation rigs following the same articulation limits actual Lego figures have. The camera systems also tried to replicate live action cinematography, including different lenses and a Steadicam simulator. The scenery was projected through The Lego Group's own Lego Digital Designer (formerly) (created as part of Lego Design byME, which people could design their own Lego models using LDD, then upload them to the Lego website, design their own box design, and order them for actual delivery), which as CG supervisor Aidan Sarsfield detailed, "uses the official LEGO Brick Library and effectively simulates the connectivity of each of the bricks."

The saved files were then converted to design and animate in Maya and XSI. At times, the minifigures were even placed under microscopes to capture the seam lines, dirt and grime into the digital textures. Benny the spaceman was based on the line of Lego space sets sold in the 1980s, and his design includes the broken helmet chin strap, a common defect of the space sets at that time. Miller's childhood Space Village playset was used in the film.

=== Post-production ===
The Lego Movie was the first theatrical feature film produced by Warner Animation Group, and the first animated film to be made directly by Warner Bros. Pictures after Warner Bros. Feature Animation shut down in 2004, following the box office failure of Looney Tunes: Back in Action (2003). The film's total cost, including production, prints, and advertising (P&A), was $100 million. Half of the film's cost was financed by Village Roadshow Pictures, and was the only film in the franchise that Village Roadshow ever had involvement working on. The rest was covered by Warner Bros., with RatPac-Dune Entertainment providing a smaller share as part of its multi-year financing agreement with Warner Bros. Initially Warner Bros. turned down Village Roadshow Pictures when it asked to invest in the film. However, Warner Bros. later changed its mind, reportedly due to lack of confidence in the film, initially offering Village Roadshow Pictures the opportunity to finance 25% of the film, and later, an additional 25%.

== Music ==
The film's original score was composed by Mark Mothersbaugh, who had previously collaborated with Lord and Miller on Cloudy with a Chance of Meatballs (2009) and 21 Jump Street (2012). The Lego Movie soundtrack contains the score as the majority of its tracks. Also included is the song "Everything Is Awesome" written by Shawn Patterson, Joshua Bartholomew and Lisa Harriton, who additionally perform the song under the name Jo Li. The single, released on 23 January 2014, is performed by Tegan and Sara featuring The Lonely Island (Andy Samberg, Akiva Schaffer and Jorma Taccone), who wrote the rap lyrics, and is played in the film's end credits. The soundtrack was released on 4 February 2014, by WaterTower Music.

== Marketing and release ==
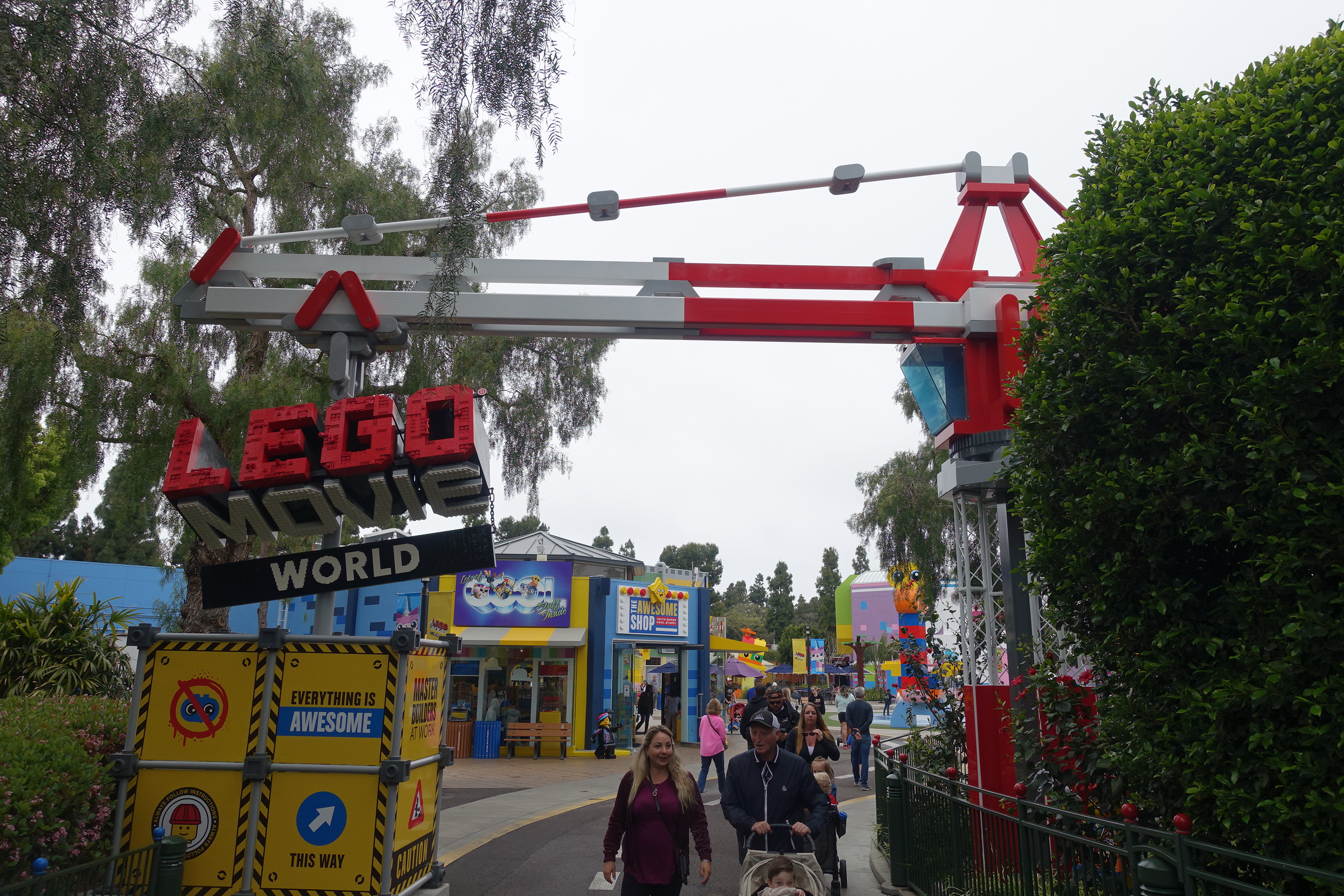
The Lego Movie World at Legoland California in 2023

Lego released multiple building toy sets based on scenes from The Lego Movie. The Lego Movie premiered on 1 February 2014, at the Regency Village Theatre in Los Angeles. It was initially scheduled for release on 28 February. but was later moved up to 7 February. The film was released in Australia by Roadshow Films.

Warner Home Video released The Lego Movie for digital download, and on DVD and Blu-ray on 17 June 2014. At the same time, a special Blu-ray 3D "Everything is Awesome Edition" also includes an exclusive Vitruvius minifigure and a collectible 3D Emmet photo. Overall, The Lego Movie was the fourth best-selling film of 2014, after Frozen, The Hunger Games: Catching Fire and Guardians of the Galaxy, selling 4.9 million units and earning a revenue of $105.2 million. The film was released on Ultra HD Blu-ray on 1 March 2016.

== Reception ==
=== Box office ===
The Lego Movie grossed $258 million in the United States and Canada and $212.8 million in other territories, for a worldwide total of $470.8 million. Deadline Hollywood calculated the film's net profit as $229 million, accounting for production budgets, marketing, talent participations, and other costs; box office grosses and home media revenues placed it third on their list of 2014's "Most Valuable Blockbusters".

In the United States and Canada, The Lego Movie was released with The Monuments Men and Vampire Academy on 7 February 2014. It earned $17.2 million on its first day, including $425,000 from Thursday night previews. During its opening weekend, the film earned $69.1 million from 3,775 theaters. Upon its debut, it achieved the second-highest February opening weekend, behind The Passion of the Christ. The Lego Movie attracted a mostly diverse audience, with about 64 percent for Caucasians, Hispanic 16 percent, African-American 12 percent, and Asian 8 percent, as well as 41 percent being under 18 years of age. Its second weekend earnings dropped by 28 percent to $49.8 million, and followed by another $31.3 million the third weekend. The latter made it the second-highest third weekend for any animated film, trailing only behind Shrek 2. The Lego Movie completed its theatrical run in the United States and Canada on 4 September 2014.

Worldwide, The Lego Movie earned $69.1 million in its opening weekend in 34 markets. On its opening weekend elsewhere, the top countries were the United Kingdom ($13.4 million), Australia ($5.7 million), Russia ($3.9 million), Mexico ($3.8 million), and France ($3.1 million). The film had the strongest start for a non-sequel animated film in the United Kingdom ahead of The Simpsons Movie and Up. It would remain as the country's highest opening weekend for a 2014 film until it was surpassed by The Amazing Spider-Man 2 that spring. As of March 2022, its top international markets were the United Kingdom ($57 million), Australia ($20 million), and Germany ($13.1 million).

=== Critical response ===
The Lego Movie was met with universal acclaim. On the review aggregator website Rotten Tomatoes, 96% of 259 critics' reviews are positive, with an average rating of 8.2/10. The critical consensus reads, "Boasting beautiful animation, a charming voice cast, laugh-a-minute gags, and a surprisingly thoughtful story, The Lego Movie is colorful fun for all ages." Metacritic, which uses a weighted average, assigned the film a score of 83 out of 100, based on 43 critics, indicating "universal acclaim". Audiences polled by CinemaScore gave the film an average grade of "A" on an A+ to F scale.

The film's live-action set as publicly exhibited at Legoland California during 2014

Michael Rechtshaffen of The Hollywood Reporter wrote, "Arriving at a time when feature animation was looking and feeling mighty anemic...The LEGO Movie shows 'em how it's done", with Peter Debruge of Variety adding that Lord and Miller "irreverently deconstruct the state of the modern blockbuster and deliver a smarter, more satisfying experience in its place, emerging with a fresh franchise for others to build upon". Susan Wloszczyna of RogerEbert.com gave the film four stars out of four, writing, "It still might be a 100-minute commercial, but at least it's a highly entertaining and, most surprisingly, a thoughtful one with in-jokes that snap, crackle and zoom by at warp speed." Tom Huddleston of Time Out said, "The script is witty, the satire surprisingly pointed, and the animation tactile and imaginative." Drew Hunt of the Chicago Reader said the filmmakers "fill the script with delightfully absurd one-liners and sharp pop culture references", with A. O. Scott of The New York Times noting that, "Pop-culture jokes ricochet off the heads of younger viewers to tickle the world-weary adults in the audience, with just enough sentimental goo applied at the end to unite the generations. Parents will dab their eyes while the kids roll theirs."

Claudia Puig of USA Today called the film "a spirited romp through a world that looks distinctively familiar, and yet freshly inventive." Liam Lacey of The Globe and Mail asked, "Can a feature-length toy commercial also work as a decent kids' movie? The bombast of the G.I. Joe and Transformers franchises might suggest no, but after an uninspired year for animated movies, The Lego Movie is a 3-D animated film that connects." Joel Arnold of NPR acknowledged that the film "may be one giant advertisement, but all the way to its plastic-mat foundation, it's an earnest piece of work—a cash grab with a heart". Peter Travers of Rolling Stone called the film "sassy enough to shoot well-aimed darts at corporate branding". Michael O'Sullivan of The Washington Post said that, "While clearly filled with affection for—and marketing tie-ins to—the titular product that's front and center, it's also something of a sharp plastic brick flung in the eye of its corporate sponsor." Moira MacDonald of The Seattle Times, while generally positive, found "it falls apart a bit near the end". Alonso Duralde of The Wrap said the film "will doubtless tickle young fans of the toys. It's just too bad that a movie that encourages you to think for yourself doesn't follow its own advice." Sandie Angulo Chen of Common Sense Media gives a rate of four stars out of five, saying, "It's a testament to the veteran animation filmmakers that this one is so smart, humorous, and visually fun to watch." She praised the voice cast, cameos, "laugh-aloud one-liners, and a live-action interlude that is surprisingly touching." She also noted the messages and "sophisticated criticisms of popular culture and consumerism" in the movie, but other than that, she calls it "not just your typical animated adventure."

The Lego Movie was included on a number of best-of lists. It was listed on many critics' top ten lists in 2014, ranking fifteenth. Several publications have listed the film as one of the best animated films, including: Insider, USA Today (2018), Rolling Stone (2019), Parade, Time Out New York, and Empire (all 2021). The film was also named by filmmaker Edgar Wright and Time film critic Richard Corliss as one of their favorite films of 2014 and acclaimed actress Tilda Swinton named it her favorite film of 2014.

=== Other responses ===
Conservative political commentator Glenn Beck praised the film for avoiding "the double meanings and adult humor I just hate". Oscar host Neil Patrick Harris referenced The Lego Movie not being nominated for Best Animated Feature, which many critics considered a snub, saying prior to the award's presentation, "If you're at the Oscar party with the guys who directed The Lego Movie, now would be a great time to distract them."

U.S. Senator Ron Johnson criticized the film's anti-corporate message, saying that it taught children that "government is good and business is bad", citing the villain's name of Lord Business. "That's done for a reason", Johnson told WisPolitics.com, "They're starting that propaganda, and it's insidious". The comments were criticized by many, and Russ Feingold brought up the comments on the campaign trail during his 2016 Senate bid against Johnson.

=== Accolades ===
At the 87th Academy Awards, The Lego Movie received a nomination for Best Original Song. Its other nominations include six Annie Awards (winning one), a British Academy Film Award (which it won), two Critics' Choice Movie Awards (winning one), and a Golden Globe Award. The National Board of Review named The Lego Movie one of the ten-best films of 2014; it also won Best Original Screenplay.

== Other media ==
In 2014, an adventure video game, The Lego Movie Videogame, was released for multiple platforms. Lego Dimensions (2015) features characters from several media franchises, including The Lego Movie. The Lego Movie: 4D – A New Adventure is a 4-D film at Legoland Florida, that has been in operation since 2016. Written and directed by Rob Schrab, the 12-minute attraction stars A.J. LoCascio as Emmet, with Banks, Brie, Day, and Offerman reprising their respective roles; while Patton Oswalt plays President Business's brother, Risky Business.

== Follow-ups ==
Warner Bros. released two spin-offs in 2017: The Lego Batman Movie and The Lego Ninjago Movie. Both films are set in different universes apart from The Lego Movie. While The Lego Batman Movie was considered a success, The Lego Ninjago Movie was a failure. A television series Unikitty! (2017–2020) focuses on the eponymous character (Tara Strong) and her friends. The Lego Movie was followed by The Lego Movie 2: The Second Part in 2019. Following the financial failures of both The Lego Ninjago Movie and The Lego Movie 2, Universal Pictures set a five-year film deal with The Lego Group.
