= Shawn Patterson (composer) =

American composer and songwriter

- Born: Shawn Michael Patterson; Athol, Massachusetts
- Occupations: Composer, songwriter, music producer
- Website: www.shawnpatterson.com

Shawn Michael Patterson is an American composer and songwriter. He is known for writing the song "Everything Is Awesome" for the Warner Bros. feature film The Lego Movie (2014).

== Early life ==
Shawn Patterson was born in Athol, Massachusetts, to working-class parents Ronald and Joan Patterson.

== Career ==
In 1986, Patterson left for Los Angeles to attend the Grove School of Music. In 1988, Patterson accepted a scholarship to attend the Jazz in the July program of the University of Massachusetts, Amherst. Patterson studied and performed with Dr. Billy Taylor and Max Roach.

In 1991 in Los Angeles, Patterson wrote a song for the animated television show, Alvin and the Chipmunks. The song was a rap song titled "Rock the House". He began writing for trailer houses, as well as making music for international advertisement campaigns such as The Fisher King, My Girl, Alien 3, Home Alone 2: Lost in New York, and several others.

Patterson joined The Ren & Stimpy Show in various roles. He was asked to write original songs and bits of score for the show.

When The Ren & Stimpy Show ended, Patterson worked as a freelance composer and songwriter. Billy West handed Patterson's demo CD out around Los Angeles and it soon found its way into the hands of Doug Langdale and Audu Paden, who hired him as composer for the animated series, Project G.e.e.K.e.R. in 1995. He wrote a series of featured big band songs in the style of Frank Sinatra for the episode, "Ol' Blue Nose" directed by Steve Loter and sung by West, in which Stimpy sings in a style of Sinatra.

Patterson was the score composer and songwriter for three seasons of the Emmy Award-winning Adult Swim series Robot Chicken and series score composer for the award-winning TV series, El Tigre: The Adventures of Manny Rivera. He also scored the 1995 horror film The Demolitionist, and composed music for Disney Channel's Dave the Barbarian. Patterson himself guest starred as a pubescent Theodore in the Robot Chicken episode "Crushed by a Steamroller on My 53rd Birthday". Patterson is also the score composer and songwriter on DreamWorks Animation's The Adventures of Puss in Boots, a Netflix original series about the character Puss from the Shrek franchise.

Patterson wrote "Everything Is Awesome" for The Lego Movie (2014) (as performed by Tegan and Sara featuring the Lonely Island), which spent six consecutive weeks on the UK Singles and thirty-one on the UK Indie, peaking on both charts in early March 2014 at No. 17 and No. 2, respectively. In the US Billboard Hot 100, the song charted at No. 57. The single sold 418,000 copies in the United States by the end of June 2014 and became Gold certified at the end of that year. On July 14, 2017, it was certified Platinum, having sold more than 1,000,000 units since its release. It was nominated for Best Original Song by the Motion Picture Academy and was performed live at the 2015 Academy Awards. The song was also remixed for the sequel, The Lego Movie 2: The Second Part (2019).

== Awards and nominations ==
- Academy Award -nominated for Best Original Song.
- Grammy -nominated for Best Song Written for Visual Media.
- Satellite Award -nominated for Best Original Song.
- Critics' Choice Movie Award -nominated for Best Song.
- Denver Film Critics Society Award winner for Best Original Song.
- Georgia Film Critics Association nominated for it Best Original Song.
- Hollywood Music in Media Award winner for Song - Animated Film.
- Houston Film Critics Society Award winner for Best Original Song.
- Iowa Film Critics Award winner for Best Original Song.
- Phoenix Film Critics Society Award winner for Best Original Song.
- Variety Artisans Award winner.

== Personal life ==
Patterson posted on X that the attempted assassination of Donald Trump in Pennsylvania was staged.

== Filmography ==
=== Film ===
Year	Title	Notes
1995	The Demolitionist	Film composer
2014	The Lego Movie	Song writer: "Everything is Awesome"

=== Television ===
Year	Title	Notes
1994–1995	The Ren & Stimpy Show	Episodes: "Ol' Blue Nose" and "Sammy and Me"
1996	Project G.e.e.K.e.R.	
1996	KaBlam!	Segment: "The Louie and Louie Show"
1998–2002	Oh Yeah! Cartoons	Episodes: "Pete Patrick and Persian Puss: What About Lunch?", "Max" segments, "Tales from the Goose Lady" segments, "Hubbykins and Sweetiepie", "The Youngstar 3"
1999	The Angry Beavers	vocalist with Charlie Brissette and Mitch Schauer (episode: "The Legend of Kid Friendly")
2003–2005	Dave the Barbarian	
2005–2007	The X's	
2007–2008	El Tigre: The Adventures of Manny Rivera	
2008	Tak and the Power of Juju	
2009	Titan Maximum	
2010–2014	Robot Chicken	Seasons 5–7
2012–2013	The High Fructose Adventures of Annoying Orange	
2014	Max Steel	Season 2
2015–2018	The Adventures of Puss in Boots	
2016	Victor and Valentino	Pilot episode
