= List of Lego films and TV series =

This article chronicles the history of the depiction of Lego building toys in media franchising with emphasis on film and television co-produced by owner The Lego Group.

== History ==
Brickfilms (films using Lego) have existed since the 1970s. In 2003, Lego officially made its first collaboration to make films based on its toy property. They chose Bionicle as the property and they made a deal with Miramax to make a trilogy of Bionicle films. After the trilogy ended, a new trilogy based on Bionicle was planned with Universal Pictures after the Miramax film contract ended and the first film in the new trilogy would be titled Bionicle: The Legend Reborn, but plans broke down between Lego and Universal, resulting in the fifth film being cancelled. Another film was later released, entitled Lego: The Adventures of Clutch Powers. The film received positive reviews from fans and critics and, after the DVD release, a sequel was set to star Clutch as the hero again. A short film based on Clutch Powers was later released but a full sequel never materialized. The name "Clutch Powers" is a tribute to the term the LEGO Group uses in quality control tests to describe characteristics of the ABS plastic: "clutch power" describes the force with which studs and anti-studs adhere.

In the summer of 2009, Lego made a deal with Warner Bros. Pictures to make a film based on the property. In the same year, Lego also planned the concept for the now successful theme Lego Ninjago. In 2011, Lego released a TV series titled Ninjago: Masters of Spinjitzu and Ninjago series achieved popularity. A video game based on the show was later released and the show reached its planned conclusion after a two-year run.

A new show titled Legends of Chima aired in January 2013 and was intended to be Ninjago's successor. The show received mixed reviews, however, with Lego fans instead demanding the return of Ninjago. Lego revived Ninjago: Masters of Spinjitzu in 2014 with a new season and continued to release 1–2 seasons every year.

Initially titled Lego: The Piece of Resistance, the film was later renamed The Lego Movie by Warner Bros. and was released in February 2014. Due to the critical and commercial success of the film, it launched a franchise, and its sequel, The Lego Movie 2: The Second Part, was released five years later, while its spin-offs, The Lego Batman Movie and The Lego Ninjago Movie, were released in 2017, with an animated television series titled Unikitty! premiering in the same year. The Lego Ninjago Movie is not connected to the events shown in the television show.

In 2014, Mixels also debuted. In late 2015, Nexo Knights was introduced, replacing Legends of Chima.

In late 2016, Ninjago released a Halloween TV special for its fifth anniversary.

An additional film with Warner Bros named Billion Brick Race was planned, but cancelled in 2018 for unknown reasons. Little is known about what the film was supposed to be, with the exception of some concept artwork shared by director Jorge Gutierrez.

In March 2019, Ninjago released an 88-minute TV movie called March of the Oni on Cartoon Network, which also celebrated the 100th episode of the show. The show reached its 11th year of airing having released season 15 in 2022.

By April 2020, Universal Pictures established a five-year deal for exclusive rights for the production of further Lego films with The Lego Group; the four existing Lego films made by Warner Bros. (The Lego Movie, The Lego Movie 2: The Second Part, The Lego Batman Movie, and The Lego Ninjago Movie) would stay with that studio. This move potentially allows Universal to make Lego films based on its own catalog of properties such as Woody Woodpecker, Curious George, Jaws, Back to the Future, Jurassic Park, Fast & Furious, The Land Before Time, Despicable Me, The Secret Life of Pets, Johnny English, Sing, Bourne, Ted, Child's Play / Chucky, Shrek, Trolls, Madagascar, Kung Fu Panda, How to Train Your Dragon, The Boss Baby, Spirit, Shark Tale, The Bad Guys, Over the Hedge, Monsters vs. Aliens, Megamind, The Croods, Ruby Gillman, The Wild Robot, and Forgotten Island.

On August 5, 2022, in a podcast interview with The Ankler, Dan Lin revealed that he'll produce an upcoming Lego film that is in development, saying "We know we have to switch it up and take to a different art form that's still true to LEGO." Lin promised that the creative team had "reinvented" the Lego world for the film, but it does not yet have a release date. By July 2023, it was announced that it will be a live-action/animation hybrid similar to the films of The Lego Movie franchise, and that Aaron and Adam Nee were attached to direct the film.

In January 2024, it was announced that Pharrell Williams was making an animated biographical film of his career, titled Piece by Piece, in Lego form. It was released on October 11, 2024, by Focus Features the United States and Canada, and Universal Pictures internationally.

In October 2024, Universal Pictures confirmed the production of three new LEGO films, each directed by Jake Kasdan, Patty Jenkins, and Joe Cornish. Kasdan's film is based on an original concept by Matt Mider and Kevin Burrows, featuring a script by Andrew Mogel and Jarrad Paul. Jenkins is working with Geoff Johns to write the screenplay of her film. Cornish, in turn, is revising a draft by Heather Anne Campbell based on a treatment by Simon Rich. These films are announced to be set in live-action. A new live-action film set in the Lego Ninjago theme is also confirmed, and will be written by Dan and Kevin Hageman, who were initially the head writers of the first nine seasons of the original Ninjago television series. It remains unclear whether these films will incorporate animation in any form or be entirely live-action.

In July 2025, Kenny Ortega was announced as an executive producer to a live-action television musical based on the Lego Friends theme, set to release on October 16, 2026. The film, titled Lego Friends: Heartlake the Musical, is LEGO's first live-action musical feature.

In August 2025, James Morosini was revealed to be developing a Lego film with Universal titled Inner Child from a spec script originally written for live-action.

== Feature films ==
=== Theatrical films ===
Year	Title	Co-production with	Distributor	Notes
2014	The Lego Movie	Warner Animation Group; Village Roadshow Pictures; RatPac-Dune Entertainment; Vertigo Entertainment; Lin Pictures; Animal Logic	Warner Bros. Pictures	First installment of The Lego Movie franchise
2015	A Lego Brickumentary	Global Emerging Markets; HeLo	RADIUS-TWC	Documentary film
2017	The Lego Batman Movie	Warner Animation Group; DC Entertainment; RatPac-Dune Entertainment; Lin Pictures; Lord Miller Productions; Vertigo Entertainment; Animal Logic	Warner Bros. Pictures	Spin-offs of The Lego Movie.
2017	The Lego Ninjago Movie	Warner Animation Group; RatPac-Dune Entertainment; Lin Pictures; Lord Miller Productions; Vertigo Entertainment; Animal Logic	Warner Bros. Pictures	Spin-offs of The Lego Movie.
2019	The Lego Movie 2: The Second Part	Warner Animation Group; Rideback; Lord Miller Productions; Vertigo Entertainment; Animal Logic	Warner Bros. Pictures	Sequel to The Lego Movie.
2024	Piece by Piece	Tremolo Productions; I Am Other	Focus Features (United States); Universal Pictures (International)	Animated biographical film about Pharrell Williams.
Upcoming
TBA	Untitled live-action/animated Lego film	Rideback	Universal Pictures	Live-action/animated hybrid
TBA	Untitled live-action Lego film directed by Jake Kasdan	—N/a	Universal Pictures	First live-action Lego film
TBA	Untitled live-action Lego film directed by Patty Jenkins	—N/a	Universal Pictures	Second live-action Lego film
TBA	Untitled live-action Lego film directed by Joe Cornish	—N/a	Universal Pictures	Third live-action Lego film
TBA	Untitled live-action Lego Ninjago film	—N/a	Universal Pictures	Fourth live-action Lego film, first live-action adaptation of Lego Ninjago theme
TBA	Inner Child	—N/a	Universal Pictures	New theatrical Lego film in development at Universal Pictures

=== Direct-to-video films ===
Year	Title	Co-production with	Distributor	Notes
2003	Bionicle: Mask of Light	Creative Capers Entertainment; Create TV & Film Limited; Miramax Home Entertainment	Buena Vista Home Entertainment	
2004	Bionicle 2: Legends of Metru Nui	Creative Capers Entertainment; Create TV & Film Limited; Miramax Home Entertainment	Buena Vista Home Entertainment	Prequel to Bionicle: Mask of Light.
2005	Bionicle 3: Web of Shadows	Creative Capers Entertainment; Create TV & Film Limited; Miramax Home Entertainment	Buena Vista Home Entertainment	Sequel to Bionicle 2: Legends of Metru Nui.
2009	Bionicle: The Legend Reborn	Tinseltown Toons; Threshold Animation Studios	Universal Studios Home Entertainment	
2010	Lego: The Adventures of Clutch Powers	Tinseltown Toons; Threshold Animation Studios	Universal Studios Home Entertainment	
2010	Hero Factory: Rise of the Rookies	Tinseltown Toons; Threshold Animation Studios	Warner Home Video	Film version of episodes 1–4 of Hero Factory.
2011	Hero Factory: Savage Planet	Tinseltown Toons; Threshold Animation Studios	Warner Home Video	Film version of episodes 6 and 7 of Hero Factory.
2013	Lego Batman: The Movie – DC Super Heroes Unite	Warner Premiere; TT Animation; DC Entertainment	Warner Home Video	Based on the video game Lego Batman 2: DC Super Heroes. Includes a Clark Kent/Superman Lego minifigure.
2015	Lego Friends: Girlz 4 Life	M2 Entertainment	Warner Home Video	
2015	Lego DC Comics Super Heroes: Justice League vs. Bizarro League	Warner Bros. Animation; DC Entertainment	Warner Home Video	Includes a Batzarro Lego minifigure.
2015	Lego DC Super Heroes: Justice League – Attack of the Legion of Doom	Warner Bros. Animation; DC Entertainment	Warner Home Video	Includes a Trickster Lego minifigure. First Lego DC film based on the timeline of The New 52.
2016	Lego DC Super Heroes: Justice League – Cosmic Clash	Warner Bros. Animation; DC Entertainment	Warner Home Video	Includes a Cosmic Boy Lego minifigure.
2016	Lego Scooby-Doo! Haunted Hollywood	Warner Bros. Animation	Warner Home Video	Includes a Scooby-Doo Lego minifigure.
2016	Lego DC Super Heroes: Justice League – Gotham City Breakout	Warner Bros. Animation; DC Entertainment	Warner Home Video	Includes a Nightwing Lego minifigure.
2017	Lego Scooby-Doo! Blowout Beach Bash	Warner Bros. Animation	Warner Bros. Home Entertainment	
2017	Lego DC Super Hero Girls: Brain Drain	Warner Bros. Animation; DC Entertainment	Warner Bros. Home Entertainment	
2018	Lego DC Super Heroes: The Flash	Warner Bros. Animation; DC Entertainment	Warner Bros. Home Entertainment	Included as part of a bundle with Lego DC Comics Super Heroes: Aquaman: Rage of Atlantis in some editions.
2018	Lego DC Super Hero Girls: Super-Villain High	Warner Bros. Animation; DC Entertainment	Warner Bros. Home Entertainment	
2018	Lego DC Super Heroes: Aquaman – Rage of Atlantis	Warner Bros. Animation; DC Entertainment	Warner Bros. Home Entertainment	Includes a Jessica Cruz Lego minifigure.
2019	Lego DC Batman: Family Matters	Warner Bros. Animation; DC Entertainment	Warner Bros. Home Entertainment	Includes a Mini Ultimate Batmobile Lego vehicle.
2020	Lego DC Shazam! Magic and Monsters	Warner Bros. Animation; DC Entertainment	Warner Bros. Home Entertainment	Includes a Shazam Lego minifigure.

== Short films ==
Year	Title	Co-production with	Notes
2001	Jack Stone	Artworld UK	Released on VHS.
2001	Monty Python & the Holy Grail in Lego	Spite Your Face Productions	Released as a bonus feature on the Monty Python and the Holy Grail DVD release.
2002	Lego Racers 4D	Unknown	Shown in the Legoland theme parks.
2005	Lego Star Wars: Revenge of the Brick	Treehouse Animation	Premiered on Cartoon Network.
2006	Lego Batman: Bricks, Bats & Bad Guys	Treehouse Animation	Premiered on Cartoon Network.
2006	Spellbreaker 4D	Unknown	Shown in the Legoland theme parks.
2008	Lego Indiana Jones and the Raiders of the Lost Brick	M2Film	Premiered on Cartoon Network
2009	Lego Star Wars: The Quest for R2-D2	M2Film	Premiered on Cartoon Network
2010	Lego Clutch Powers: Bad Hair Day	Tinseltown Toons; Threshold Animation Studios	Released as a bonus feature on the Lego: The Adventures of Clutch Powers DVD release.
2010	LEGO Prince of Persia Mini Movie	Unknown	Aired on Disney XD.
2010	Lego Star Wars: Bombad Bounty	M2Film	Premiered on Cartoon Network.
2011	Lego City: A Clutch Powers 4D Adventure	Threshold Animation Studios	Shown in the Legoland theme parks.
2012	The Lego Story	Lani Pixels	Produced to celebrate The Lego Group's 80th anniversary.
2012	Lego Marvel Super Heroes TV Short	Unknown	Aired on Disney XD.
2013	Legends of Chima: 4D Movie Experience	M2Film	Shown in the Legoland theme parks.
2014	Enter the Ninjago	Warner Animation Group; Animal Logic	Released as a bonus feature on The Lego Movie DVD and Blu-ray release.
2016	The Lego Movie: 4D – A New Adventure	Pure Imagination Studios	Shown in the Legoland theme parks.
2016	Nexo Knights 4D: The Book of Creativity	M2 Entertainment	Shown in the Legoland theme parks.
2016	Lego Jurassic World: Employee Safety Video	Universal Pictures Home Entertainment	Released as bonus on the Jurassic World/Lego Jurassic World 2-pack DVD.
2016	The Master	Warner Animation Group; Animal Logic	Shown in theaters with Storks.
2017	Batmersive VR Experience	Warner Animation Group; Animal Logic	Virtual reality short film; released online.
2017	Dark Hoser	Warner Animation Group; Animal Logic	Released as bonus features on The Lego Batman Movie DVD release.
2017	Batman is Just Not That Into You	Warner Animation Group; Animal Logic	Released as bonus features on The Lego Batman Movie DVD release.
2017	Cooking with Alfred	Warner Animation Group; Animal Logic	Released as bonus features on The Lego Batman Movie DVD release.
2017	Movie Sound Effects: How Do They Do That?	Warner Animation Group; Animal Logic	Released as bonus features on The Lego Batman Movie DVD release.
2017	Shark E. Shark in "Which Way to the Ocean?"	Warner Animation Group; Animal Logic	Released as bonus features on The Lego Ninjago Movie DVD release.
2017	Zane's Stand Up Promo	Warner Animation Group; Animal Logic	Released as bonus features on The Lego Ninjago Movie DVD release.
2018	Lego Ninjago: Master of the 4th Dimension	Pure Imagination Studios	Shown in the Legoland theme parks.
2018	Emmet's Holiday Party	Warner Animation Group; Animal Logic	Released on YouTube.
2019	Lego City 4D - Officer in Pursuit	Pure Imagination Studios	Shown in the Legoland theme parks.
2019	Lego City Sky Police and Fire Brigade - Where Ravens Crow	M2 Entertainment	Released on YouTube as a two-part short series.
2022	Lego Mythica 4D - Journey to Mythica	Unknown	Shown in the Legoland theme parks.
2023	Lego Dreamzzz 4D Movie	Unknown	Shown in the Legoland theme parks.
2024	Lego Friends 4D Alien Invasion	Unknown	Shown in the Legoland theme parks.

== Specials ==
Year	Title	Co-production with	Network	Notes
2010	Lego Atlantis: The Movie	Threshold Animation Studios	Cartoon Network	
2011	Lego Star Wars: The Padawan Menace	Animal Logic; Lucasfilm Animation	Cartoon Network	Includes a Young Han Solo Lego minifigure in the DVD release.
2012	Lego Star Wars: The Empire Strikes Out	Threshold Animation Studios/Lucasfilm Animation	Cartoon Network	Includes a Darth Vader with Medal Lego minifigure in the DVD release.
2013	Lego Marvel Super Heroes: Maximum Overload	Arc Productions; Marvel Entertainment	Disney XD	Originally released as a five-part short miniseries.
2014	"Brick Like Me"	Gracie Films; 20th Century Fox Television	Fox	Aired as the 550th episode of The Simpsons.
2014	Jake's Buccaneer Blast	M2Film	Disney Junior	Originally released as an eight-part short series.
2014	Lego DC Comics: Batman Be-Leaguered	Warner Bros. Animation; DC Entertainment	Cartoon Network	
2015	Lego Marvel Super Heroes: Avengers Reassembled!	Arc Productions; Marvel Entertainment	Disney XD	
2015	Lego Scooby-Doo! Knight Time Terror	Warner Bros. Animation	Cartoon Network	
2015	Lego Elves: Unite the Magic	Ja Film	Disney Channel	
2016	Lego Jurassic World: The Indominus Escape	Universal Pictures Home Entertainment	Direct-to-video	Originally released as a five-part short series.
2016	Lego Elves: Dragons To Save, Time To Be Brave	Ja Film	Disney Channel	
2016	Lego Elves: Down a Dark Path	Ja Film	Disney Channel	
2016	Lego Frozen Northern Lights	M2Film	Disney Channel	Originally released as a five-part short series.
2016	Ninjago: Day of the Departed	Wil Film ApS	Cartoon Network	Halloween special of Ninjago: Masters of Spinjitzu.
2017	Lego DC Super Hero Girls: Galactic Wonder	Warner Bros. Animation; DC Entertainment	Boomerang; Cartoon Network	
2017	Lego Marvel Super Heroes - Guardians of the Galaxy: The Thanos Threat	Marvel Entertainment	Disney XD	
2018	Lego Marvel Super Heroes - Black Panther: Trouble in Wakanda	Marvel Entertainment	YouTube; Disney XD	
2018	Lego Jurassic World: The Secret Exhibit	Atomic Cartoons; Universal Studios	NBC	
2019	Lego Marvel Spider-Man: Vexed by Venom	Atomic Cartoons; Marvel Entertainment	YouTube; Disney XD	
2020	Lego Monkie Kid: A Hero is Born	Flying Bark Productions	TV3	
2020	Lego Jurassic World: Double Trouble	Atomic Cartoons; Universal Studios	Nickelodeon	
2020	The Lego Star Wars Holiday Special	Atomic Cartoons; Lucasfilm Animation	Disney+	
2020	Lego Marvel Avengers: Climate Conundrum	Atomic Cartoons; Marvel Entertainment	YouTube; Disney XD	
2020	Lego Hidden Side: Night of the Harbinger Halloween Special	Pure Imagination Studios	Cartoon Network	
2021	Lego Monkie Kid: Revenge of the Spider Queen	Flying Bark Productions	TV3	
2021	Lego Star Wars: Terrifying Tales	Atomic Cartoons; Lucasfilm Animation	Disney+	
2021	Lego Marvel Avengers: Loki in Training	Atomic Cartoons; Marvel Entertainment	Disney+	
2021	Lego Friends: Holiday Special	WildBrain Studios	YouTube	
2022	Lego Marvel Avengers: Time Twisted	Atomic Cartoons; Marvel Entertainment	Disney+	
2022	Lego Monkie Kid: Embrace Your Destiny	Flying Bark Productions	CITV	Originally released as a four-part miniseries.
2022	Lego Star Wars: Summer Vacation	Atomic Cartoons; Lucasfilm Animation	Disney+	
2023	Lego Monkie Kid: The Emperor's Wrath	Flying Bark Productions	HappyKids	
2023	Lego Disney Princess: The Castle Quest	Pure Imagination Studios	Disney+	
2023	Lego Jurassic Park: The Unofficial Retelling	Atomic Cartoons; Universal Studios	Peacock	Retelling of the film Jurassic Park.
2023	Lego Marvel Avengers: Code Red	Atomic Cartoons; Marvel Entertainment	Disney+	
2024	Lego Marvel Avengers: Mission Demolition	Atomic Cartoons; Marvel Studios Animation	Disney+	
2025	Lego Disney Princess: Villains Unite	Atomic Cartoons	Disney+	
2025	Lego Disney Frozen: Operation Puffins	Atomic Cartoons	Disney+	
2025	Lego Marvel Avengers: Strange Tails	Atomic Cartoons; Marvel Studios Animation	Disney+	
2025	Bricks on Track: Building the LEGO F1 Drivers' Parade	JustSo Films	Sky Sports	
2026	Lego Disney Princess: Magical Mayhem	Atomic Cartoons	Disney+	
2026	Lego Star Wars: The Mandalorian	Atomic Cartoons; Lucasfilm Animation	Disney+	
2026	Lego One Piece	Atomic Cartoons; Shueisha	Netflix	Adaptation of the first two seasons of the One Piece live-action series.
2026	Lego Friends: Heartlake the Musical	Final Pixel	YouTube; Peacock; Netflix; Tubi	

== Television series ==
Title	Original running	Seasons / Episodes	Co-production with	Network	Notes
Ended
Edward and Friends	1987	1 season, 28 episodes	FilmFair	BBC2	Based on the Fabuland theme.
Galidor: Defenders of the Outer Dimension	2002	2 seasons, 26 episodes	CinéGroupe; Tom Lynch Company	Fox Kids	First live-action series based on a Lego theme.
Little Robots	2003–2005	5 seasons, 65 episodes	Cosgrove Hall Films	CBeebies	
Lego Hero Factory	2010–2014	11 episodes	Threshold Animation Studios (episodes 1–10); Ghost (episode 11)	Nicktoons (episodes 1–10); YouTube (episode 11)	
Ninjago	2011–2022	15 seasons, 210 episodes	Wil Film ApS (seasons 1–10); WildBrain Studios (seasons 11–15)	Cartoon Network (2011–2020); Netflix (2011–2022)	Formerly known as Ninjago: Masters of Spinjitzu in the pilot episodes and from seasons 1 to 10.
Lego Friends of Heartlake City	2012–2017	5 seasons, 19 episodes	M2 Entertainment	Disney Channel	
Lego Star Wars: The Yoda Chronicles	2013–2014	2 seasons, 7 episodes	Wil Film ApS; Lucasfilm	Cartoon Network (2013); Disney XD (2014)	Miniseries. Renamed as Star Wars: The New Yoda Chronicles for the 2014 episodes.
Legends of Chima	2013–2014	3 seasons, 41 episodes	M2 Entertainment	Cartoon Network	
Mixels	2014–2016	2 seasons, 31 episodes	Cartoon Network Studios	Cartoon Network	First 2D-animated series based on a Lego theme.
Lego Elves	2015–2018	2 seasons, 36 episodes	Ja Film	Disney Channel	
Lego Star Wars: Droid Tales	2015	1 season, 5 episodes	Wil Film ApS; Lucasfilm	Disney XD	Miniseries.
Nexo Knights	2016–2017	4 seasons, 40 episodes	M2 Entertainment	Cartoon Network	
Lego Bionicle: The Journey to One	2016	1 season, 5 episodes	Volta	Netflix	
Lego Friends: The Power of Friendship	2016	2 seasons, 4 episodes	M2 Entertainment	Netflix	
Lego Star Wars: The Freemaker Adventures	2016–2017	2 seasons, 26 episodes	Wil Film ApS; Lucasfilm	Disney XD	
Lego Elves: Secret of Elvendale	2017	1 season, 8 episodes	Studio Mir	Netflix	
Lego Masters UK	2017–2018	2 seasons, 10 episodes	Tuesday's Child; Endemol Shine Group	Channel 4	First reality competition series. Inspired a format used to launch localized series around the world.
Unikitty!	2017–2020	3 seasons, 104 episodes	Warner Bros. Animation	Cartoon Network	Spin-off of The Lego Movie.
Lego Star Wars: All Stars	2018	1 season, 5 episodes	Wil Film ApS; Lucasfilm	Disney XD	
Lego Friends: Girls on a Mission	2018–2021	4 seasons, 70 episodes	M2 Entertainment	KidsClick (2018–2019); Kabillion (2019–2021)	
Lego Jurassic World: Legend of Isla Nublar	2019	1 season, 13 episodes	Atomic Cartoons; Universal Brand Development	Nickelodeon	Miniseries.
Lego Hidden Side	2019–2020	2 seasons, 20 episodes	Pure Imagination Studios	YouTube; HappyKids	Web short series.
Lego City Adventures	2019–2022	4 seasons, 65 episodes	Passion Paris; Axis Studios (seasons 1–2)	Nickelodeon (seasons 1–2); Netflix (seasons 1–4); YouTube (season 4)	
Lego Dreamzzz	2023-2026	3 seasons, 60 episodes	Pure Imagination Studios (seasons 1-2); WildBrain Studios (season 3)	Amazon Prime Video; Netflix; YouTube; Sky UK; ITVX; Happykids	
Lego Pixar: BrickToons	2024	1 season, 5 episodes	Pixar Animation Studios; Atomic Cartoons	Disney+	Short films based on Pixar films.
Lego Star Wars: Rebuild the Galaxy	2024	2 seasons, 8 episodes total	Lucasfilm; Atomic Cartoons	Disney+	Miniseries
Lego Star Wars: Rebuild the Galaxy - Pieces of the Past	2025	2 seasons, 8 episodes total	Lucasfilm; Atomic Cartoons	Disney+	Miniseries
Ongoing
Lego Monkie Kid	2020–present	5 seasons, 58 episodes	Flying Bark Productions (seasons 1–4); WildBrain Studios (season 5)	Amazon Prime Video (seasons 1–2); HappyKids (season 3–present)	
Lego Friends: The Next Chapter	2023–present	2 seasons, 21 episodes	Passion Paris; Superprod Animation (season 2–present)	YouTube; Netflix; HappyKids	
Ninjago: Dragons Rising	2023–present	4 seasons, 80 episodes	WildBrain Studios	Netflix	Sequel to Ninjago.
Lego City: No Limits	2023–present	4 seasons, 34 episodes	Blue Zoo Animation Studio	YouTube; ITVX	Web short series.
Lego Friends: Pet Pals	2026–present	1 season, 10 episodes	Copernicus Studios	YouTube	Web short series.

== Series by themes ==
=== Lego City ===
- Lego City Shorts (2011–present)
- Lego City Adventures (2019–2022)
- Lego City 4D - Officer in Pursuit (2019)
- Lego City Sky Police and Fire Brigade - Where Ravens Crow (2019)
- Lego City: No Limits (2023–present)

=== Lego Ninjago ===
- Ninjago (2011–2022)
- Lego Ninjago: Day of the Departed (2016)
- The Lego Ninjago Movie (2017) (also part of The Lego Movie franchise)
- Lego Ninjago: Master of the 4th Dimension (2018)
- Ninjago: Dragons Rising (2023–present)

=== Bionicle ===
- Bionicle: Mask of Light (2003)
- Bionicle 2: Legends of Metru Nui (2004)
- Bionicle 3: Web of Shadows (2005)
- Bionicle: The Legend Reborn (2009)
- Lego Bionicle: The Journey to One (2016)

=== Clutch Powers ===
- Lego: The Adventures of Clutch Powers (2010)
- Lego Clutch Powers: Bad Hair Day (2010)
- Lego City: A Clutch Powers 4-D Adventure (2011)

=== Lego Star Wars ===
- Lego Star Wars: Revenge of the Brick (2005)
- Lego Star Wars: The Quest for R2-D2 (2009)
- Lego Star Wars: Bombad Bounty (2010)
- Lego Star Wars: The Padawan Menace (2011)
- Lego Star Wars: The Empire Strikes Out (2012)
- Lego Star Wars: The Yoda Chronicles (2013)
- Lego Star Wars: The New Yoda Chronicles (2014)
- Lego Star Wars: Droid Tales (2015)
- Lego Star Wars: The Resistance Rises (2016)
- Lego Star Wars: The Freemaker Adventures (2016–2017)
- Lego Star Wars: All-Stars (2018)
- The Lego Star Wars Holiday Special (2020)
- Lego Star Wars: Terrifying Tales (2021)
- Lego Star Wars: Summer Vacation (2022)
- Lego Star Wars: Rebuild the Galaxy and Lego Star Wars: Rebuild the Galaxy - Pieces of the Past (2024–2025)
- Lego Star Wars: The Mandalorian (2026)

=== Lego Friends ===
- Lego Friends of Heartlake City (2012–2017)
- Lego Friends: Girlz 4 Life (2015)
- Lego Friends: The Power of Friendship (2016)
- Lego Friends: Girls on a Mission (2018–2021)
- Lego Friends: The Next Chapter (2023–present)
- Lego Friends: Pet Pals (2026–present)

=== The Lego Movie ===
- The Lego Movie (2014)
- The Lego Movie: 4D – A New Adventure (2016)
- The Lego Batman Movie (2017) (also part of the Lego DC franchise)
- The Lego Ninjago Movie (2017) (also part of the Lego Ninjago franchise)
- Unikitty! (2017–2020)
- The Lego Movie 2: The Second Part (2019)

=== Lego Super Heroes ===
==== Lego DC ====
- Lego Batman: Bricks, Bats and Bad Guys (2006)
- Lego Batman: The Movie – DC Super Heroes Unite (2013)
- Lego DC: Batman Be-Leaguered (2014)
- Lego DC Super Heroes: Justice League vs. Bizarro League (2015)
- Lego DC Super Heroes: Justice League – Attack of the Legion of Doom (2015)
- Lego DC Super Heroes: Justice League – Cosmic Clash (2016)
- Lego DC Super Heroes: Justice League – Gotham City Breakout (2016)
- The Lego Batman Movie (2017) (also part of The Lego Movie franchise)
- Lego DC Super Hero Girls: Galactic Wonder (2017)
- Lego DC Super Hero Girls: Brain Drain (2017)
- Lego DC Super Heroes: The Flash (2018)
- Lego DC Super Hero Girls: Super-Villain High (2018)
- Lego DC Super Heroes: Aquaman – Rage of Atlantis (2018)
- Lego DC Batman: Family Matters (2019)
- Lego DC Shazam! Magic and Monsters (2020)

==== Lego Ultimate Marvel ====
- Lego Marvel Super Heroes TV Short (2012)
- Lego Marvel Super Heroes: Maximum Overload (2013)
- Lego Marvel Super Heroes: Avengers Reassembled (2015)
- Lego Marvel Super Heroes - Guardians of the Galaxy: The Thanos Threat (2017)
- Lego Marvel Super Heroes: Black Panther: Trouble in Wakanda (2018)
- Lego Marvel Spider-Man: Vexed by Venom (2019)
- Lego Marvel Avengers: Climate Conundrum (2020)
- Lego Marvel Avengers: Loki in Training (2021)
- Lego Marvel Avengers: Time Twisted (2022)
- Lego Marvel Avengers: Code Red (2023)
- Lego Marvel Avengers: Mission Demolition (2024)
- Lego Marvel Avengers: Strange Tails (2025)

=== Lego Elves ===
- Lego Elves: Unite the Magic (2015)
- Lego Elves (2015–2018)
- Lego Elves: Dragons To Save, Time To Be Brave (2016)
- Lego Elves: Down a Dark Path (2016)
- Lego Elves: Secret of Elvendale (2017)

=== Lego Scooby-Doo ===
- Lego Scooby-Doo! Knight Time Terror (2015)
- Lego Scooby-Doo! Haunted Hollywood (2016)
- Lego Scooby-Doo! Blowout Beach Bash (2017)

=== Lego Jurassic World ===
- Lego Jurassic World: The Indominus Escape (2016)
- Lego Jurassic World: Employee Safety Video (2016)
- Lego Jurassic World: The Secret Exhibit (2018)
- Lego Jurassic World: Legend of Isla Nublar (2019)
- Lego Jurassic World: Double Trouble (2020)
- Lego Jurassic Park: The Unofficial Retelling (2023)

=== Lego Disney Princess ===
- Lego Disney Princess: The Castle Quest (2023)
- Lego Disney Princess: Villains Unite (2025)
- Lego Disney Princess: Magical Mayhem (2026)

=== Other series ===
- Monty Python & the Holy Grail in Lego (2001)
- Galidor: Defenders of the Outer Dimension (2002)
- Lego Indiana Jones and the Raiders of the Lost Brick (2008)
- Lego Atlantis: The Movie (2010)
- LEGO Prince of Persia Mini Movie (2010)
- Hero Factory (2010–2014)
- Legends of Chima (2013–2014)
- The Simpsons: "Brick Like Me" (2014)
- Mixels (2014–16)
- Nexo Knights (2016–2017)
- Lego Hidden Side (2019–2020)
- Lego Monkie Kid (2020–present)
- Lego Dreamzzz (2023–2026)
- Lego One Piece (2026)
