= Lego Belville =

Lego theme

- Sub‑themes: Girl-oriented designs
- Availability: 1994–2009
- Total sets: 88
- Official website

Lego Belville is a discontinued Lego theme designed to appeal primarily to girls. First introduced in 1994, the theme included multi-jointed doll-like characters that were larger in scale than the traditional Lego minifigure. The toy sets were produced from standard Lego bricks and larger pieces, often in a pink and purple colour scheme, and depicted scenes from fairy tales and fantasy as well as everyday life. The product line was discontinued in 2009. Belville's direct successor is Lego Friends, which was introduced in 2012. Other Lego product ranges that have been designed for girls include Homemaker (1971–1982), Paradisa (1991–1997) and Scala (1997–2001).

== Overview ==
Belville was a product line that was marketed at girls. It was produced from standard Lego bricks, but also featured larger decorative pieces. The range also featured pink Lego pieces, which had been introduced for the first time in the Paradisa sets. Belville figures were larger than the Lego minifigure, but their feet could still attach to traditional Lego pieces. The figures had several points of articulation, such as at the head, shoulders, elbows, wrists, knees and ankles, and more overall detail than traditional minifigures. The early Belville toy sets featured scenes from everyday life.

== Launch ==
Belville originated in earlier Lego themes, such as Scala, which was launched in 1979 and Paradisa, which appeared in 1992 as a sub theme of Lego Town. Lego products had previously been marketed towards both boys and girls as far back as 1958, when Town Plan toy sets featured images of boys and girls on the boxes. However, it was not until 1971, with the release of Living Room set (260) and Complete Kitchen set (261), that Lego products were marketed specifically to girls. In 1979, a product range called Scala was launched, which was a range of jewellery targeted directly at girls. However, due to its poor performance, Scala jewellery products were discontinued in 1981. This was followed by the launch of the Lego Town sub-theme named Paradisa in 1992, which was also marketed to girls and focused on a beachside community. The Paradisa product line lasted for four years before being discontinued and was joined by a new brand named Belville in 1994.

== Construction sets ==
According to BrickLink, 88 toy sets were released as part of the Belville product line. The product line was eventually discontinued by the end of 2009.

The earliest Belville toy sets featured domestic scenes, including a playhouse and playpark, and a nursery set named Love 'N Lullabies (5860), which continued for seven years. In addition, horse and pony sets were released in 1997, such as Jennifer's Foal (5822), and beach sets were released in 1998. Following this, a fairytale fantasy theme was launched in 1999, which dropped the "System" name from the packaging. The fairytale theme featured the characters Princess Rosaline and Prince Justin in various toy sets, such as royal coach (5827) and enchanted palace (5808). In 2001, some toy sets featured story books, such as Enchanted Garden (5834), which included a book titled The Adventures of the Little Princesses.

In 2002, a range of Belville toy sets was released known as Belville: Cold North due to its winter wonderland setting. The toy sets featured various characters, including Queen Rose, Wicked Madam Frost and Vanilla. This was replaced in 2003 by a desert theme, known as Golden Palace or Golden Land, and a flower fairy theme. In 2004, the Belville range returned to everyday scenes, but replaced domestic settings with toy sets centred on music and talent shows, such as Pop Studio (5942) and Interior Designer (5943).

In 2005, five toy sets were released based on the work of Hans Christian Andersen. Belville: Hans Christian Andersen released toy sets based on fairytales, including The Mermaid Castle (5960), The Snow Queen (5961), The Tinderbox (5962), The Princess and the Pea (5963) and Thumberlina (5964). These were followed by other fairytale toy sets in 2006, including Winter Wonder Palace (7577) and Ultimate Princesses (7578).

In 2008, the Belville theme released four non-fantasy playsets that centred around horse-riding, including Playful Puppy (7583), Horse Stable (7585), Sunshine Home (7586) and Horse Jumping (7587).

== Other merchandise ==
The Lego Group also sold other items under the Belville trademark such as ice cube trays with unique shapes and purses.

== See also ==
- Lego Friends
- Lego Disney
- Lego DC Super Hero Girls
- Lego Elves
- Lego Unikitty!
- Lego Gabby's Dollhouse
