= Lego trains =

Lego theme

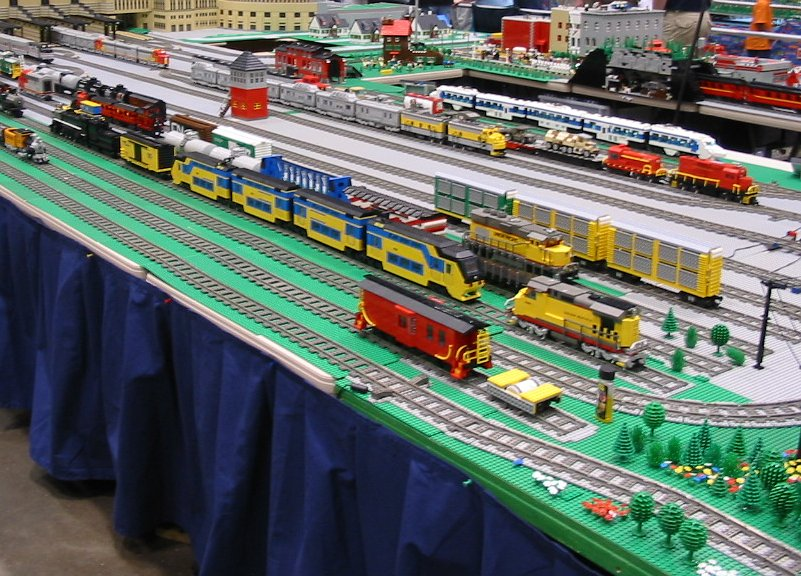
One section of a massive Lego train layout at the National Train Show in Cincinnati, Ohio, July 9, 2005

The Danish brand of building blocks Lego has been extensively used to construct miniature models of trains and railroads; The Lego Group having released construction sets featuring them since the 1960s. The official product line, produced from 1980 until 2003, became a subtheme of Lego City in 2005. The theme is popular among adult and child Lego fans, having spawned international associations and conventions.

== History ==
While the first Lego construction sets featuring trains were not released until the 1960s, The Lego Group produced many wooden trains under Ole Kirk Christiansen beginning in the 1930s. The first battery powered Lego train was released in 1966. At the time, 4.5 volt batteries were used.

Lego Trains were made an official product line in 1980. The product line was retired in 2003 and incorporated into the larger Lego World City line of sets, which was replaced by the current Lego City theme several years after.

In 2007, Lego began to retire the current 9-volt and RC systems and replace it with the Power Functions system for Lego trains. Powered Up, the contemporary system for motorizing Lego sets, was introduced in the late 2010s. Sets connected to it can be controlled using Bluetooth through the Powered Up smartphone app.

== Gauge ==
The train system is sometimes referred to as 'L-gauge' among Lego fans, in reference to traditional model railway scales. Lego trains use a nominal gauge of 37.5 mm (1 15/32 in), based on 5-stud track centerlines gauge, roughly corresponding with a 1:38 scale.
