= Lego Homemaker =

Lego series

- Availability: 1971–1982
- Total sets: 32

Lego Homemaker is a discontinued product range of the Lego construction toy designed to appeal primarily to girls. Introduced in 1971, the theme centered on domestic and suburban life-based settings.

Sets marketed under this theme were released until 1982. During the lifetime of the theme, 32 sets were issued for sale.

== Background ==
The larger sets could be assembled to build complete room settings of a house, including a kitchen, living room, bathroom and bedrooms (for both adults and children). Smaller "impulse" sets could build models of other household fixtures, such as tables and chairs, a television, an armoire, a grandfather clock and a fireplace. Suburban-themed sets included models of a school classroom, a beauty salon, a secretary's desk and a doctor's office. Unlike later female-oriented themes, the Homemaker sets included just the colors in Lego's then-standard color palette, including black, blue, red, white and yellow.

=== Homemaker figures ===
The sets are known for using "Homemaker" figures to represent the people in the set. Introduced in 1974, the figures were built using standard LEGO bricks, with a headpiece that could be inserted into a special 2x2 brick. The arm pieces, which attached to the same special brick, could be made of one or two lengths to represent either children or adults. Hair and other attachments were also provided to complete the figure. Starting in 1979 and continuing until the end of the series, several Homemaker sets included minifigures to represent toddlers and infants.

The "Homemaker" figures would be included in the Universal Building Set line (a range of sets that focused on building and creativity) issued in 1977.

== Other female-oriented themes ==
Other product ranges that have been targeted to females have included Paradisa (1991–1997), Scala (1997–2001), Belville (1994–2009) and Friends (2012–present).
