= Lego City =

Lego theme

- Other names: Legoland; Legoland Town; Lego World City; Lego City Center (U.S.); Lego City Centre (UK)
- Sub‑themes: Fire; Police; Elite Police; Forest Police; Sky Police; Mountain Police; Prison Island; EMS; Swamp Police; Train; Great Vehicles; Diving; Demolition; Arctic; Volcano; Space; Jungle; Mining; Racing; Stuntz
- Subject: City life
- Availability: 1978 (as "Legoland Town")–present
- Total sets: 1476
- Official website

Lego City is a theme under which Lego building sets are released based on city life, with the models depicting city and emergency services (such as police and fire), airport, train, construction, and civilian services. It evolved from Legoland Town as one of the three original themes that Lego produced upon its launch of the Lego minifigure in 1978 along with Castle and Space, with each of the three themes representing the 'Past' (Castle), 'Present' (Town) and 'Future' (Space). The Town brand was briefly replaced with Lego World City in 2003 and 2004 before it was rebranded as Lego City in 2005.

== Overview ==
The Lego City theme traces its origins to Lego Town, a theme introduced with the first minifigures in 1978, when a completely new range of buildings and vehicles were introduced for the European markets, although Lego sets with city buildings and vehicles had been commonplace since the late 1960s.

Prior to 1978, Legoland-branded sets were focused mainly around buildings and vehicles which were intended to function more as static models. In 1975, a precursor to the minifigure was introduced, in the same scale but without moving parts. These "stiffs" (as they are nicknamed by Lego enthusiasts) were still unable to ride the vehicles. This was changed with the new minifigures – in 1978 in Europe and 1979 in North America the first vehicles that were minifigure compatible were also released, although some smaller sets still combined the minifigure with model vehicles. In 1980, the Trains theme was completely revamped to complement the Town sets. By 1983, the remaining vehicle based sets that were not minifigure compatible had been discontinued.

All sets were originally released under the "LEGOLAND" label until it was discontinued and replaced with "Lego System" branding in 1991. Eventually, different sub-themes under the "Town" brand were used to tie together related sets, such as police, coast guard, emergency services, airport, road rescue, trains, fire, and harbor. In 1999 Lego Town was replaced by City which was known as Lego City Center in The United States. The theme was discontinued in 2002, and replaced by Lego World City in 2003. During the Christmas season, a City-themed advent calendar set is sold through the online Lego Shop and at retailers.

On 22 June 2019, Lego City Adventures aired on Nickelodeon during a Saturday morning lineup along with SpongeBob SquarePants. From 2020 on, the annual City Advent Calendars would be based on the show specifically, rather than Lego City in general.

In June 2020, following the murder of George Floyd by police, Lego made an announcement that they would temporarily stop marketing police-related Lego City sets. Due to misinformation claiming that they removed these sets from being sold that led to backlash, Lego issued a follow-up statement emphasizing that the sets were still for sale and that digital advertising for the sets would just be temporarily halted.

In January 2021, Lego released a new plate-based road system for the City theme that differed from its predecessor, which used baseplates whose height equaled one-half of plate. However, this system was criticized by some members of the Lego community due to its alleged incompatibility with the former baseplates, which had been gradually reduced in usage and limited to sets such as Lego Modular Buildings, and are less cost-effective.

== Sub-themes ==
According to BrickLink, The Lego Group has released 1,629 playsets and promotional packs of the Lego City theme.

Outside of Lego City's generic city and town life based sets that are released regularly (with Fire and Police being the two most prolific – both of which have been the flagship sets throughout the history of the theme), City has had various subthemes, many of which are recurring. Under the Lego Town theme, the subthemes released during the 1990s and early 2000s also had individualized branding and labeling. In 2003 and 2004, the only town-based sets were released under the "World City" label. Since the launch of City in 2005, they are just labeled as City sets but often have multiple sets based around a single concept released at the same time during Lego's release schedule.

Many of these subthemes would diverge notably from the urban city life depicted in general sets, including such themes as leisure resorts, rural farming and space port rocket launching.

In September 2021, Matthew Ashton, The Lego Group's Vice President of Design announced the City alongside Friends, Creator, Classic, Technic, Speed Champions, Monkie Kid, Ninjago, Collectible Minifigures and DOTS themes would continue until at least 2023.

From 1991 to 2002, sub-themes included Arctic, Boats, City Center, Classic, Coastguard, Construction, Drivers, Extreme Team, Fire, Flight, Football, Launch Command, Leisure, Maintenance, Medical, Outback, Paradisa, Police, Race, Racing, Res-Q, Shell, and Vehicles.

From 2005 to the present, sub-themes have included Airport, Arctic, Cargo, Coast Guard, Construction, Deep Sea Explorers, Farm, Fire, General, Harbour, Jungle, Medical, Mining, Police, Seasonal, Space, Town, Trains, Traffic, Volcano Explorers, and Wildlife Rescue.

Stuntz is a sub-theme and was launched on 1 October 2021. Total of 10 sets being released and featured fly-wheel powered bike functionality. Also included launch ramps, flywheel stunt bikes, obstacles, building Lego flames and dare-devil type challenges.

== Octan ==
Octan logo, unchanged since 1992

Octan is a fictional oil company that has appeared in multiple Lego sets since 1992. Prior to this, logos of the real-world oil companies were used. Esso was used up until 1966, when it was replaced by Shell in all markets except the United States, where Exxon was used instead. The Shell logo continued to be used on promotional sets after that time. In 2014, Lego announced it would not renew its marketing agreement with Shell, under pressure from the environmental group Greenpeace.

Octan first appeared in the 1992 sets "6397 Gas N' Wash Express" and "6594 Gas Transit". Since the release of the Octan name, Lego has not signed any further deals with Shell or other gas corporations, as Octan was made the primary vehicle fluid company.

Octan (or oktan) is the Danish word for octane, a component of gasoline.

Octan has appeared in a number of Lego video games. Lego Island for example features an Octan gas station and the company sponsors the race track.

In The Lego Movie, Octan is the base company of the main antagonist Lord Business (voiced by Will Ferrell). His company is the producer of almost all of the commodities in his dominion.

In a number of Town and City sets it is shown that Octan has a racing team that competes in at least Formula One, GT racing and rallying.

== Video games ==
A video game developed by TT Fusion called Lego City Undercover was released for the Wii U on 18 March 2013; a port of the game was released 4 April 2017, on Microsoft Windows, Nintendo Switch, PlayStation 4, and Xbox One. A prequel to the game called Lego City Undercover: The Chase Begins was also released for the Nintendo 3DS on 21 April 2013. Lego City content, based on Lego City Undercover, was added to the toys-to-life video game Lego Dimensions on 9 May 2017, via a "fun pack" containing a Chase McCain minifigure and a constructible Police Helicopter.

A mobile video game, Lego City My City, was released in 2014. A sequel, Lego City My City 2, was released in 2016.

== Television series ==
| Series | Season | Episodes | Originally released | | |
| Series | Season | Episodes | First released | Last released | Network |
|---|---|---|---|---|---|
| Lego City Adventures | 1 | 13 | June 22, 2019 | December 8, 2019 | Nickelodeon; Netflix |
| Lego City Adventures | 2 | 10 | March 8, 2020 | December 12, 2020 | Nickelodeon; Netflix |
| Lego City Adventures | 3 | 22 | April 15, 2022 | | Netflix |
| Lego City Adventures | 4 | 20 | October 25, 2022 | November 22, 2022 | Netflix; YouTube |
| LEGO City No Limits | 1 | 24 | August 23, 2023 | July 31, 2026 | YouTube |
| LEGO City No Limits | 5 | TBA | July 1, 2024 | | YouTube |

In 2019, Nickelodeon premiered a new series in June of that year, based on the Lego City theme. The series, titled Lego City Adventures features the newly introduced named characters from the brand as they do their daily jobs in the fictional metropolis.

=== No Limits ===
Lego City
- Also known as: LEGO City No Limits MAX; LEGO City No Limits
- Genre: Comedy, Action, Science Fiction
- Starring: Nezer Alderazi, Mercer Boffey, Miriam-Teak Lee, Megan Gage, Erin Maria Walther, Liza Ross, Naomi McDonald, and Nathan Osgood
- Opening theme: Citizen's Jam, performed by Ilya Zhornik
- Ending theme: Citizen's Jam

Production
- Producer: Blue Zoo Animation Studio
- Running time: 4-5 minutes per episode

LEGO City No Limits is a weekly shorts series released by Lego on YouTube based on Lego City and their 'No Limits' theming. It was first released on August 23, 2023. This series focused on a small friend group of extreme-stunt vloggers pushing their limits in the city. There are four seasons, but a fifth season is planned. The producer is Blue Zoo. The current antagonists are NoFace and Collector. The main characters are the No Limits Crew and the Brickles.

==== Characters ====
- Just Jason: A teenage stunt performer and the eldest child of the Brickles family, voiced by Mercer Boffey.
- Bytz: A technician who owns a comic book store. He is Just Jason's friend since the day when he delivered pizza to Jason. He is also one-eighth pirate and hates pirate imitations, voiced by Nezer Alderazi.
- Mech.Max: She is the group's inventive mechanic and car wizard who builds and modifies custom vehicles, voiced by Megan Gage.
- Wanda About: She is the nature-loving explorer and treasure seeker who loves outdoor adventures, voiced by Miriam-Teak Lee.
- Drea Brickles: Jason's younger sister, voiced by Erin Maria Walther.
- Ted Brickles: A construction builder and the father of Just Jason, voiced by Nathan Osgood.
- Jenny Brickles: She is a dedicated astronaut and the mother of Jason and Drea, voiced by Naomi McDonald.
- Lina Brickles: An officer of the LEGO City Police Department and the grandmother of the Brickles family, voiced by Liza Ross.
- NoFace/Ellie: She is a brilliant hacker and self-proclaimed biggest fan of the No Limits Crew who disguises herself as a digital villain called No Face to push the No Limits Crew to their absolute limits. She is voiced by Naomi McDonald as Ellie and David Cumming as No Face.
- The Collector: A notorious master thief who is obsessed with stealing rare and custom vehicles for his personal collection, voiced by Alex Jordan.

==== Today In Lego City ====
Today In Lego City is a pilot series to it. It focuses on Penguin and Mechanic. Its episodes are:

1. Penguin Overpacks
2. Sweet Competition
3. Solar Slushy
4. Reduce, Reuse, Retrieve Mechanic’s Keys
5. Rock Paper Slushy
6. Cool Car Makeover

==== Seasons, episodes, and plot ====
The story follows the adventures of Mech.Max, Jason "Just Jason" Brickles, Wanda About and Bytz in Lego City.

===== Season 1 =====
Bytz faces the truth of what NoFace really is, and have their final standoff after millions of adventures.

| Overall | No. | Name | Summary |
|---|---|---|---|
| 1 | 1 | Run-away Slushy Van?! | Max fixes up Bytz’ van into a slushy van. NoFace sends minions in and hacks the van, installing a lit missile and making it run away. |
| 2 | 2 | Sky Jump—Gone Wrong?! | Jason and Rocket Racer need to be saved by a Fireman. |
| 3 | 3 | Built The World’s biggest SKI SLOPE! | NoFace hacks a poll and Jason does a crazy dumb thing to save Bytz’ life. |
| 4 | 4 | Dodgeball Against The ENTIRE CITY?! | Bytz needs to beat Fire Chief Freya |
| 5 | 5 | We Discover CURSED TREASURE! | Wanda is in the arctic circle and discovers treasure, but a curse causes it to go anything but smoothly. |
| 6 | 6 | I was In A REAL POLICE CHASE! | Jason accidentally joins Nick Smash and Daisy Kaboom Lewis. |
| 7 | 7 | Drone Challenge - ARE THOSE LASERS?! | Bytz needs to “brolieve in broself” to save Jason from sharks and lasers. |
| 8 | 8 | We Survived A METEOR STORM?! | Bytz and Wanda go to space and find a mysterious pink crystal. They get separated and then the crystal moves them back together again. |
| 9 | 9 | We Meet The Fans - NOFACE REVEAL | Ellie turns out to be NoFace. |
| 10 | 10 | Sky Challenge - WE FLIPPED A JET?! | NoFace’s plan is foiled. |

===== Season 2 =====
Just Jason learns if you want it, you take it; and tries to fight it as the other No Limits crew members do awesome stuff.

| Overall | No. | Episode | Plot |
|---|---|---|---|
| 11 | 1 | IMPOSSIBLE PRISON BREAK - STUNTS ONLY! | The crew breaks out of prison. |
| 12 | 2 | Floating Cars | The Collector is out of jail, because Jason freed him in the previous episode. |
| 13 | 3 | Jungle vs. City | Max and Wanda have a competition. |
| 14 | 4 | Battle Royal on planet X | Wanda and Bytz fight Rick Sports on Planet X. |
| 15 | 5 | Tiny Robot Ruins Everything! | Rusty Trails (a robot) and explorer Wanda About find themselves on Planet X again, tasked with collecting chartreuse-skinned skinny three-eyed three-tentacled aliens called Slimes, and Rusty, attempting to save one, gets trapped in a volcano. Wanda About saves both Rusty and the Slime. |
| 16 | 6 | Can I COLLECT THE COLLECTOR?! | Jason is on the case-on with help from Duke DeTain and Mech.Max to re-apprehend the notorious Collector. |
| 17 | 7 | Prison Break- ROBOT EDITION | Max and Wanda must escape prison when testing Max’s security bots. They ultimately kill King Bot (a giant robot with a deep voice and a razor blade hand). |
| 18 | 8 | Delivering Pizzas WITH A ROLLERCOASTER! | Bytz tells the tale of him and Jason’s meeting, and before that is a questionable story about a secret society made up of Bytz, Papergirl Robyn, and a doctor and a female deliveryperson that uses a rollercoaster to get to Jason’s house and need to defeat a robot. Jason doesn’t act like this is fictional whereas Wanda and Max are skeptical until the end where Max remarks how sweet it is. |

===== Season 3 =====
Just Jason reunites with his family, but learns that they have to run from the cops, defeat all kinds of wacky villains, and get chased by his hater Slippy The Penguin.

| Overall | No. | Name | Plot |
|---|---|---|---|
| 19 | 1 | Police Want Donuts - Bro What?! | The Brickles need to beat the police to Galaxy Donuts. |
| 20 | 2 | Dad, What are you Doing?! - Race goes Wrong | Jason and Ted are soapbox racing as “the Duck Duo”, and Jason needs to let his dad win after leaving him to be on Rocket Racer’s team. |
| 21 | 3 | We Became SPACE COPS?! | Jenny needs to learn “cop stuff”, and Jason needs to learn “space stuff” to stop Nick Smash and Daisy Kaboom Lewis. |
| 22 | 4 | Highest Level Villain vs. My Grandma | Jason is sick of capturing low level thugs like Captain Boat Costume and Vitamin X. He and his grandma Lina find themselves against two level five villains - The Brothers. |
| 23 | 5 | Impossible Scrapyard Challenge - Break In | Drea and Jason are messing around and accidentally send Just Jason’s beloved dune buggy named Dune Buddy into the tribal territory of the majorly-destructive Scrappers. |
| 24 | 6 | Penguin Attack - Jason’s Dark Past | Drea, Jason, Ted, and Jenny go to the Arctic to find food and penguins led by Slippy attempt to get revenge on them. |

===== Season 4 =====
Stunts, video games, and racing, even DREAMING, get more intense as Jason, Max, Drea, and DanTDM get into all kinds of trouble.

| Overall | No. | Name | Plot |
|---|---|---|---|
| 25 | 1 | EVERY VEHICLE UNLOCKED?! | The Collector is out of jail and gives Just Jason his vehicle collection. |
| 26 | 2 | WILD Evil Horse Chase | Jason and Duke are chasing a group of wheel-stealing cowboys led by Rawhide Clyde The Horse and learn Rawhide used to be a cop horse. |
| 27 | 3 | Instant Delivery - GET EVERYTHING! | Jason gets instant delivery, allowing him to get everything from distracting kittens to a guy called Garry. |
| 28 | 4 | Banana Sam - An Unbeatable Opponent | Jason finds himself running from Banana Sam. |
| 29 | 5 | Five Frights Scariest Challenge | Jason and Bytz are going through five trials of fear. |
| 30 | 6 | Underground Racing Rivals | Max and Jason reveal their racing secret. |
| 31 | 7 | DanTDM’s Zomboe-Challenge | Drea and Jason attend a VR zombie-themed game made by DanTDM. |
| 32 | 8 | Stunt Taxi vs. Airplane | Drea and Jason need to get the airport. |
| 33 | 9 | Fire Dog to The Rescue! | Eggs (Jason’s dog) needs to prove she can be a firefighting dog by saving Jason from the Collector. |
| 34 | 10 | Jason and DanTDM Adventure | Jason and DanTDM chase the Dream Glitcher through the dream world. |

== Theme park attractions ==
In 2002, a Lego City themed land was introduced to Legoland Deutschland Resort, featuring Airport, Harbour Cruise, Hyundai Legoland Driving School, Hyundai Legoland Junior Driving School, Lego Factory, Legoland Express, Power Builder and Shipyard Playground.

In 2011, a Lego City themed land was introduced to Legoland Florida, featuring Ford Driving School, Ford Jr. Driving School, Flying School, Boating School and Rescue Academy.

In 2012, a Lego City themed land was introduced to Legoland Malaysia Resort. The City area is designed as a miniature town with attractions and rides controlled by children. The area featuring Boating School, Driving School, Junior Driving School, Lego City Airport, Legoland Express, Rescue Academy and The Shipyard.

In 2017, a Lego City themed land was introduced to Legoland Japan Resort. Lego City is on the park's north side, with fun activities for the children and family to do together, like the Junior Driving School where children learn to drive an electric car and receive a driver's license at the end of the ride. Coast Guard HQ allows the driver to take the wheel in a gentle and relaxing boat ride. Besides showing children how to drive, the Rescue Academy offers a fun experience where teamwork is needed to put out fires. The resort also has a Lego cinema where everyone is welcome to watch Lego movies. Lego City has various places to visit such as the Studio Store, Heartlake Shop, and City Shop, each shop with a different theme. There are also three places to buy snacks or lunch, Pit Stop Juice ‘n’ Drive, Brick House Burgers and Marina Snack Shack.

In 2021, a Lego City themed land was introduced to Legoland New York a land that is made to look like a city and based on the Lego City toy theme. The area featuring Coast Guard Academy, Driving School, Fire Academy and Junior Driving School.

Lego City 4D - Officer in Pursuit was released in Legoland California Resort on 12 April 2019 and then rolled out to other Legoland Parks and Legoland Discovery Centres in 2019. It is currently located in all Legoland parks and Legoland Discovery Centres and is available at scheduled times alongside other short films, including The Lego Movie: 4D – A New Adventure and Lego Ninjago: Master of the 4th Dimension.

In November 2021, Lego City themed land was announced for the upcoming launch of Legoland Shanghai Resort in 2024.

== Reception ==
In September 2016, The Lego Group reported that the Lego City, Lego Star Wars, Lego Ninjago and Lego Nexo Knights themes had delivered a turnover of DKK 15,692 million in the first half of 2016, a sales increase of 10 per cent compared with the same period in the previous year.

In March 2022, The Lego Group reported that the Lego City, Lego Technic, Lego Creator Expert, Lego Harry Potter and Lego Star Wars themes had earned for the full year of 2021. Revenue for the year grew 27 percent versus 2020 to DKK 55.3 billion and consumer sales grew 22 percent over the same period, outpacing the toy industry and driving market share growth globally and in largest markets.

On 28 September 2022, The Lego Group reported that the Lego Star Wars, Lego Technic, Lego Icons (formerly Creator Expert), Lego City, Lego Harry Potter and Lego Friends themes had earned for the six months ending 30 June 2022. Revenue for the period grew 17 percent to DKK 27.0 billion compared with the same period in 2021, driven by strong demand. Consumer sales grew 13 percent, significantly ahead of the toy industry, contributing to global market share growth.

In January 2023, Farmers Market (set number: 60345) was listed as one of "The Best Lego Sets for Kids in 2023" by IGN.

In March 2023, The Lego Group reported that the Lego City, Lego Technic, Lego Icons, Lego Harry Potter and Lego Star Wars themes had earned for the full year of 2022. Revenue for the year grew 17 percent to DKK 64.6 billion and consumer sales grew 12 percent in 2022, achieving growth in all major market groups with especially strong performance in the Americas and Western Europe.

In August 2023, The Lego Group reported that the Lego Icons, Lego Star Wars, Lego Technic and Lego City themes had earned for the first six months of 2023. Revenue was DKK 27.4 billion, a growth of 1% compared with H1 2022. Consumer sales grew 3% outperforming a declining toy market and contributing to strong market share growth.

== Awards and nominations ==
In 2008, Lego City was awarded "Toy of the Year" and also "Activity Toy of the Year" by the Toy Association.

In 2009, Garage (set number: 7642) was awarded "DreamToys" in the Construction category by the Toy Retailers Association.

In 2010, Airport (set number: 3182) and Cargo Truck (set number: 3221) were awarded "DreamToys" in the Creative Play category by the Toy Retailers Association.

In 2011, Harbour (set number: 4645), Police Boat (set number: 7287) and Police Station (set number: 7498) were awarded "DreamToys" in the Construction category by the Toy Retailers Association.

In 2012, Mine (set number: 4204) was awarded "DreamToys" in the Construction category by the Toy Retailers Association.

In 2013, Coast Guard (set number: 60014) was awarded "DreamToys" in the Granny Knows Best category by the Toy Retailers Association.

In 2014, Mobile Police Unit (set number: 60044) was awarded "DreamToys" in the Build The World category by the Toy Retailers Association.

In 2015, Deep Sea Exploration Vessel (set number: 60095) was awarded "DreamToys" in the Build It And They Will Thrive category by the Toy Retailers Association.

In 2016, Volcano Exploration Base (set number: 60124) was awarded "DreamToys" in the Action Station category by the Toy Retailers Association.

In 2017, Coast Guard 4x4 Response Unit (set number: 60165) and Jungle Exploration Site (set number: 60161) were awarded "DreamToys" in the Build It, Make It, Do It category by the Toy Retailers Association.

In 2018, Arctic Mobile Exploration Base (set number: 60195) was awarded "DreamToys" in the Play, Set & Match category by the Toy Retailers Association.

In 2019, Deep Space Rocket and Launch Control (set number: 60228) was awarded "DreamToys" in the Trains, Planes and Automobiles category by the Toy Retailers Association.

In 2020, Deep Space Rocket and Launch Control (set number: 60228) was awarded "Toy of the Year" and also "Construction Toy of the Year" by the Toy Association.

In 2021, Stunt Show Truck (set number: 60294) was awarded "DreamToys" in the Everybody's Building category by the Toy Retailers Association.

== See also ==
- Lego City 4D – Officer in Pursuit
- Lego Castle
- Lego Pirates
- Lego Space
- Lego Trains
