= Lego City My City =

2014 video game

- Developer: Hibernum Creations
- Platforms: iOS; Android
- Release: 2014

Lego City My City is a 2014 video game based on the Lego City line of sets developed by Quebec-based studio Hibernum Creations and released for iOS and Android. It has since been discontinued. A sequel, Lego City My City 2, was released in 2016.

== Gameplay ==
The game contains a collection of minigames which can be played around the city with increasing difficulty levels.

== Reception ==
Harry Slater of Pocket Gamer rated the game 3.5/5 stars, stating that it had "all the charm we've come to associate with the Lego games," but did not recommend it for "more experienced players". Android Mag gave the game a mostly positive review, rating the game 4/5 stars, while Tony Strobach of GamePro gave it a mixed one.

== Sequel ==
The sequel, Lego City My City 2, was developed by Amuzo Games and released in the summer of 2016. The game expands upon the features of the original. Players complete missions around the city and are able to purchase buildings to add to the city as well as design their own vehicles.
