= Lego City 4D – Officer in Pursuit =

Short 4D film attraction

- Promotional film poster
- Directed by: Michael D. Black
- Written by: Michael D. Black
- Based on: Lego City
- Produced by: Laura Jackloski; Joshua Wexler
- Starring: Jonathan Alberto; Michael R. Johnson; Paige Mount
- Edited by: Michael D. Black; Alex Verlage
- Music by: David Wurst; Eric Wurst
- Production company: Pure Imagination Studios
- Distributed by: The Lego Group
- Release date: 12 April 2019
- Running time: 12 minutes

Lego City 4D - Officer in Pursuit is a 4-D animated short film attraction based on Lego City. It was released in Legoland California on 12 April 2019 and then rolled out to other Legoland parks and Legoland Discovery Centres in 2019. The film has a runtime of 12 minutes and uses a variety of sensory effects to enhance the experience. The plot focuses on the Lego City police as they pursue a robber in a high-speed chase through the streets of the city. The film was produced by Pure Imagination Studios and distributed by The Lego Group.

== Plot ==
The story is a high-speed chase that follows a Lego City police officer as he pursues a criminal through the streets and skyscrapers of the city. There are many twists and turns along the way that involve the officer getting wet, flying and getting "bubbled", which are enhanced by sensory 4D effects.

== Cast ==
- Jonathan Alberto as Police Man
- Michael R. Johnson as Crook
- Paige Mount as Police Woman

== 4D effects ==
Viewers are provided with 3D glasses to experience the visual effects. The film is designed to be an immersive experience and incorporates 4D sensory effects during its 12-minute run time. These include water, wind, fire, fog, bubbles and special lighting effects.

== Distribution ==
Lego City 4D – Officer in Pursuit was released in Legoland California Resort on 12 April 2019 and then rolled out to other Legoland Parks and Legoland Discovery Centres in 2019. It is currently located in all Legoland parks and Legoland Discovery Centres and is available at scheduled times alongside other short films, including The Lego Movie: 4D – A New Adventure and Lego Ninjago: Master of the 4th Dimension.

== See also ==
- The Lego Movie: 4D – A New Adventure
- Lego Ninjago: Master of the 4th Dimension
- List of Lego films and TV series
