= The Lego Movie: 4D – A New Adventure =

Short 4D film attraction

- Promotional poster

Ride statistics
- Attraction type: 4D film
- Theme: The Lego Movie
- Duration: 12 minutes
- Produced by: Joshua Wexler; Leslie Barker
- Directed by: Rob Schrab
- Written by: Adam Pava; Rob Schrab
- Opening Date: January 29, 2016
- Based on: The Lego Movie by Phil Lord and Christopher Miller
- Starring: A.J. LoCascio; Elizabeth Banks; Alison Brie; Charlie Day; Nick Offerman; Patton Oswalt
- Music By: David Wurst; Eric Wurst

The Lego Movie: 4D – A New Adventure is a 4D film attraction based on The Lego Movie, which premiered at Legoland Florida on 29 January 2016 and was rolled out to other Legoland parks and Legoland Discovery Centres. The story features some of the original characters from The Lego Movie who are invited to a theme park called Brick World. The story is enhanced with a variety of 4D sensory effects.

== Plot ==
Following the events of the first film, Emmet, Wyldstyle, Unikitty, Benny and MetalBeard reunite to go to Legoland. However, they instead receive an invitation to go to a knock-off called Brick World. They then meet Risky Business, Lord Business' older brother, who tries to hypnotise them to perform in a Lego Movie live show. MetalBeard, Unikitty and Benny quickly go to their attractions, while Emmet goes with Wyldstyle to his. Emmet is unhappy, so Wyldstyle takes him to her attraction to cheer him up.

Because of the extent, the group end up enjoying Brick World; Business takes advantage and sends his robots to hypnotise them with VIP wristbands. Emmet and Wyldstyle evade being hypnotised and discover Business' evil plans, as well as the audience. With the help of the audience, Emmet and Wyldstyle build a lemonade stand mech and save their friends. Business tries to escape, but a policeman stops Risky from doing so, and arrests him for making Brick World without permission. Emmet and Wyldstyle thank the audience before finally heading to Legoland with their friends.

== Cast ==
- A. J. LoCascio as Emmet Brickowski, He was originally voiced by Chris Pratt in the films.
- Elizabeth Banks as Lucy "Wyldstyle"
- Alison Brie as Princess Unikitty
- Charlie Day as Benny
- Nick Offerman as MetalBeard
- Patton Oswalt as Risky Business
- David Burrows as Risky Business' Robots
- Rob Schrab as Man of the Audience/Planty
- Adam Pava as Police Man

== 4D effects ==
Viewers are provided with 3D glasses to experience the visual effects. The film is designed to be an immersive experience and incorporates 4D sensory effects during its 12-minute run time. These include sound, wind, fog and lighting effects.

== Production ==
The Lego Movie: 4D – A New Adventure was produced by Pure Imagination Studios and The Lego Group. The story was written by Adam Pava and Rob Schrab and the film was directed by Rob Schrab.

== Distribution ==
The Lego Movie: 4D – A New Adventure was launched on 29 January 2016 at Legoland Florida and rolled out to other Legoland parks and Legoland Discovery Centres. It is currently located in all Legoland parks and Legoland Discovery Centres along with a location in Warner Bros. Movie World. It is available at scheduled times alongside other short films, including Lego City 4D - Officer in Pursuit and Lego Ninjago: Master of the 4th Dimension.

== See also ==
- Lego Ninjago: Master of the 4th Dimension
- Lego City 4D - Officer in Pursuit
- List of Lego films and TV series
