= National Train Show =

The National Train Show (or NTS) is held as part of the annual National Convention of the National Model Railroad Association. Held in a different city each year, it consists of railfan and model railroading products, and model train layouts created by clubs. In 2005, it occupied about 300,000 square feet (28,000 m^{2}) of display space and had about 20,000 visitors.
