= Lego Ninjago: Master of the 4th Dimension =

Short 4D film attraction

- Promotional film poster
- Directed by: Michael D. Black
- Written by: Robert Henry
- Story by: Michael D. Black
- Based on: Ninjago (TV series)
- Produced by: Paul Harvey; Laura Jackloski; Joshua Wexler
- Starring: Michael Adamthwaite; Paul Dobson; Kelly Metzger; Brent Miller; Kirby Morrow; Vincent Tong; Sam Vincent
- Edited by: Michael D. Black
- Music by: David Wurst; Eric Wurst
- Production company: Pure Imagination Studios
- Distributed by: The Lego Group
- Release date: 12 January 2018
- Running time: 12 minutes

Lego Ninjago: Master of the 4th Dimension is a 4-D animated short film attraction based on the Ninjago television series. It was released in Legoland California Resort on 12 January 2018 and then rolled out to other Legoland parks and Legoland Discovery Centres in 2018. The film has a runtime of 12 minutes and uses a variety of sensory effects to enhance the experience. The plot focuses on the events that take place when Master Wu prepares the ninja for the teachings of the "Scroll of the 4th Dimension". The film was produced by Pure Imagination Studios and distributed by The Lego Group.

== Plot ==
The plot focuses on a lesson on perspective given by Master Wu to the ninja. After showing off their individual elemental powers to the audience in the dojo, the ninja are scolded by Master Wu, who warns them about being proud. Master Wu then proceeds to teach the ninja a lesson about how time is experienced differently based on perception. He presents the "Scroll of the Fourth Dimension", which holds great power, and then offers a demonstration. Master Wu explains that with the knowledge of the scroll, a spinjitzu master can manipulate time and space. When Master Wu asks the ninja to once again demonstrate their elemental powers, he uses the scroll to freeze them in time and afterwards explains that only the most disciplined ninja can use the scroll. When Master Wu leaves the ninja to their training, he forgets to take the scroll with him. The ninja race to retrieve it and Lloyd reaches it first. When he attempts the second lesson on the scroll, it affects gravity and he loses his grip on the scroll. After their efforts to move around the dojo to reach the scroll fail, the ninja decide to combine their elemental powers and Jay finally reaches it. When he uses the scroll, it affects organised matter, and the ninja discover that they can no longer use their elemental powers. Nya picks up the scroll, realises that they must change their perspective, and turns the scroll upside down. After she uses the scroll, the dojo is returned to its original state. Master Wu then returns for the scroll and the ninja show off their airjitzu abilities to the audience.

== Cast ==
- Michael Adamthwaite as Jay
- Paul Dobson as Master Wu
- Kelly Metzger as Nya
- Brent Miller as Zane
- Kirby Morrow as Cole
- Vincent Tong as Kai
- Sam Vincent as Lloyd

== 4D effects ==
Viewers are provided with 3D glasses to experience the visual effects. The film incorporates 4D sensory effects during its 12-minute run time to enhance the viewing experience. These include music, sound effects, lasers, smoke, water and strobe lighting effects.

== Distribution ==
Lego Ninjago: Master of the 4th Dimension was released in Legoland California Resort on 12 January 2018 and then rolled out to other Legoland Parks and Legoland Discovery Centres in 2018. It is currently located in all Legoland parks and Legoland Discovery Centres and is available at scheduled times alongside other short films, including The Lego Movie: 4D – A New Adventure and Lego City 4D - Officer in Pursuit.

== Reception ==
Family Review Guide said, "There are so many fun aspects to this film. It is 12 minutes long and includes a lot of sensory effects like feeling wind, getting a little wet from water and so much more!"

Lesdudis said, "if you and your family are fans of the Ninjago: Masters Of Spinjitzu show and the LEGO Ninjago Movie, then you’ll love Master of the 4th Dimension! It combines elements of the Ninjago franchise with a little bit of Doctor Strange-esque magic."

== See also ==
- Lego Ninjago
- Ninjago (TV series)
- List of Ninjago episodes
- The Lego Movie: 4D – A New Adventure
- Lego City 4D - Officer in Pursuit
- List of Lego films and TV series
