= Lego City Adventures =

Multinational television series

- Genre: Comedy
- Based on: Characters, storylines, and concepts created by The Lego Group
- Directed by: Dana Dorian; Laurent Nicolas; Samuel Tourneaux
- Voices of: Joe Zieja; Misty Lee; Alex Cazares; Daniel MK Cohen; James Arnold Taylor; Roger Craig Smith; Mick Lauer
- Composers: HiTnRuN; Marc Andria Papi (season 3)
- Countries of origin: France; United Kingdom; Denmark; United States
- Original language: English
- No. of seasons: 4
- No. of episodes: 65

Production
- Executive producers: Jill Wilfert; Robert Fewkes; Keith Malone; Marc Bodin-Joyeux; Richard Scott (seasons 1–2)
- Producers: Katrine Talks; Jon Colton Barry; Lars Danielsen; Sigurd Hartmeyer-Dinesen (seasons 1–2); Andrew Pearce (seasons 1–2); Sueann Rochester (seasons 1–2); Paula Bird; Matt Craig (season 3)
- Running time: 11–22 minutes
- Production companies: Passion Paris; Axis Studios (season 1–2); The Lego Group; Circus; Circus Animation

Original release
- Network: Nickelodeon
- Release: June 22, 2019 – December 12, 2020
- Network: Netflix
- Release: April 15, 2022
- Network: YouTube
- Release: October 25 – November 22, 2022

Lego City Adventures is an animated television series that premiered on Nickelodeon in the United States on June 22, 2019, loosely based on the long-running Lego City toyline theme. The third season of the series was released on Netflix in its entirety on April 15, 2022, and the fourth and final season was released on The Lego Group's YouTube channel on October 25, 2022. It is the second Lego series on Nickelodeon, following 2010's Lego Hero Factory.

== Overview ==
Lego City Adventures is an animated series set in a busy metropolis. The series follows the adventures of the city's community workers, such as the police, firefighters and sanitation workers. Among the characters thrust into extraordinary adventures are cop Sgt. Duke DeTain, crisis-ready fire Chief Freya McCloud, grumpy street sweeper Shirley Keeper, eager handyman Harl Hubbs, dedicated city Mayor Solomon Fleck, Vice Mayor Carol Yea, business rivals R.E. Fendrich and Mary Sinclair, Freya's troublesome nephew Billy McCloud, and skateboarding police Chief Percival "Wheelie" Wheeler.

== Characters ==
- Sergeant Duke DeTain (voiced by Joe Zieja)
- Freya McCloud (voiced by Misty Lee)
- Shirley Keeper (voiced by Alex Cazares)
- Harl Hubbs (voiced by Daniel MK Cohen)
- Tippy Dorman (voiced by James Arnold Taylor)
- Solomon Fleck (voiced by Roger Craig Smith)
- Percival "Wheelie" Wheeler (voiced by Mick Lauer)

== Production ==
On February 14, 2019, it was announced that Lego City Adventures would be a part of Nickelodeon's 2019 slate. On May 14, 2019, it was announced that the program would premiere on June 22, 2019. The series is a co-production between Axis Studios and French companies Passion Paris and Circus for The Lego Group.

== Episodes ==
=== Series overview ===
| Season | Episodes | Originally released | | |
| Season | Episodes | First released | Last released | Network |
|---|---|---|---|---|
| 1 | 13 | June 22, 2019 | December 8, 2019 | Nickelodeon |
| 2 | 10 | March 8, 2020 | December 12, 2020 | Nickelodeon |
| 3 | 22 | April 15, 2022 | | Netflix |
| 4 | 20 | October 25, 2022 | November 22, 2022 | YouTube |

=== Season 1 (2019) ===
| No. overall | No. in season | Title | Original release date | Prod. code | U.S. viewers (millions) |
|---|---|---|---|---|---|
| 1 | 1 | "Cubs and Robbers" | June 22, 2019 | 101 | 0.80 |
| 1 | 1 | "Billy the Bug" | June 22, 2019 | 101 | 0.80 |
| 2 | 2 | "Sky Police" | June 29, 2019 | 102 | 0.80 |
| 2 | 2 | "Father's Day Parade" | June 29, 2019 | 102 | 0.80 |
| 3 | 3 | "Race to the Top" | July 6, 2019 | 103 | 0.88 |
| 3 | 3 | "Meet Harl Hubbs" | July 6, 2019 | 103 | 0.88 |
| 4 | 4 | "Doorman of the City" | July 27, 2019 | 104 | 0.83 |
| 4 | 4 | "Fendrich In The Wild" | July 27, 2019 | 104 | 0.83 |
| 5 | 5 | "Poppy Starr" | August 10, 2019 | 105 | 0.75 |
| 5 | 5 | "The Spooky One" | August 10, 2019 | 105 | 0.75 |
| 6 | 6 | "Small Carol" | November 10, 2019 | 106 | 0.65 |
| 6 | 6 | "Last Man Floating" | November 10, 2019 | 106 | 0.65 |
| 7 | 7 | "Evil Layers" | November 17, 2019 | 107B | 0.51 |
| 8 | 8 | "Buster" | November 17, 2019 | 108A | 0.51 |
| 9 | 9 | "Shirley Keeper" | November 24, 2019 | 108B | 0.52 |
| 10 | 10 | "3, 2, 1" | November 24, 2019 | 109A | 0.52 |
| 11 | 11 | "Police Navidad" | December 1, 2019 | 107A | 0.64 |
| 12 | 12 | "Paradoors" | December 1, 2019 | 109B | 0.64 |
| 13 | 13 | "Slam the Door" | December 8, 2019 | 110 | 0.64 |
| 13 | 13 | "JAILBREAK!" | December 8, 2019 | 110 | 0.64 |

=== Season 2 (2020) ===
| No. overall | No. in season | Title | Original release date | Prod. code | U.S. viewers (millions) |
|---|---|---|---|---|---|
| 14 | 1 | "Buster Moves" | March 8, 2020 | 201 | 0.39 |
| 14 | 1 | "To Cop or Not to Cop" | March 8, 2020 | 201 | 0.39 |
| 15 | 2 | "Handle with Car" | March 15, 2020 | 202 | 0.48 |
| 15 | 2 | "The Silver Blur" | March 15, 2020 | 202 | 0.48 |
| 16 | 3 | "Harl Hubbs Day" | March 29, 2020 | 203 | 0.55 |
| 16 | 3 | "Ann They're Off" | March 29, 2020 | 203 | 0.55 |
| 17 | 4 | "Bob and Clemmons' Excellent Adventure" | July 12, 2020 | 204 | 0.41 |
| 17 | 4 | "The Man With No Name With A Name" | July 12, 2020 | 204 | 0.41 |
| 18 | 5 | "Daisy Chain Gang" | July 19, 2020 | 205 | 0.28 |
| 18 | 5 | "Backdraft to School" | July 19, 2020 | 205 | 0.28 |
| 19 | 6 | "Running Mates" | July 26, 2020 | 206 | 0.27 |
| 19 | 6 | "Dirty Duke" | July 26, 2020 | 206 | 0.27 |
| 20 | 7 | "For Wheeler" | August 2, 2020 | 207 | 0.23 |
| 20 | 7 | "Brickmuda Heptagon" | August 2, 2020 | 207 | 0.23 |
| 21 | 8 | "The Quacken" | August 9, 2020 | 208 | 0.23 |
| 21 | 8 | "The Treasure of Nosepatch" | August 9, 2020 | 208 | 0.23 |
| 22 | 9 | "Midden Fleasure" | August 16, 2020 | 210 | 0.31 |
| 22 | 9 | "Tread or Alive" | August 16, 2020 | 210 | 0.31 |
| 23 | 10 | "Arrest Ye Merry Gentlemen" | December 12, 2020 | 209 | 0.42 |
| 23 | 10 | "Ride Along Kid" | December 12, 2020 | 209 | 0.42 |

=== Season 3 (2022) ===
| No. overall | No. in season | Title | Original release date | Prod. code |
|---|---|---|---|---|
| 24 | 1 | "Thank Hank" | April 15, 2022 | TBA |
| 25 | 2 | "Are the Kids Watching?" | April 15, 2022 | TBA |
| 26 | 3 | "Shirley P.I." | April 15, 2022 | TBA |
| 27 | 4 | "Please and Fang You" | April 15, 2022 | TBA |
| 28 | 5 | "Class Act" | April 15, 2022 | TBA |
| 29 | 6 | "We're #1" | April 15, 2022 | TBA |
| 30 | 7 | "Wylde Wex" | April 15, 2022 | TBA |
| 31 | 8 | "Business Is Booming" | April 15, 2022 | TBA |
| 32 | 9 | "Makeover and Over" | April 15, 2022 | TBA |
| 33 | 10 | "Lights!, Camera!, Grizzled!" | April 15, 2022 | TBA |
| 34 | 11 | "Duke Time" | April 15, 2022 | TBA |
| 35 | 12 | "Harpy Stubbs" | April 15, 2022 | TBA |
| 36 | 13 | "Quantifying Intrepidness" | April 15, 2022 | TBA |
| 37 | 14 | "Green Light" | April 15, 2022 | TBA |
| 38 | 15 | "My Cool Aunt Freya" | April 15, 2022 | TBA |
| 39 | 16 | "The Cow Jumped Over the Spoon" | April 15, 2022 | TBA |
| 40 | 17 | "Stunt City" | April 15, 2022 | TBA |
| 41 | 18 | "Of Dads and Dudes" | April 15, 2022 | TBA |
| 42 | 19 | "Fool on Fleck" | April 15, 2022 | TBA |
| 43 | 20 | "Ramping Up" | April 15, 2022 | TBA |
| 44 | 21 | "Give 'Em a Hand" | April 15, 2022 | TBA |
| 45 | 22 | "Natural Habitat" | April 15, 2022 | TBA |

=== Season 4 (2022) ===
| No. overall | No. in season | Title | Original release date |
|---|---|---|---|
| 46 | 1 | "The Brawl in City Hall" | October 25, 2022 |
| 47 | 2 | "Who is Ludmilla Ersatz?" | October 25, 2022 |
| 48 | 3 | "Crisis on Moonbase: Momentous!" | October 25, 2022 |
| 49 | 4 | "Wreckless Driving" | October 25, 2022 |
| 50 | 5 | "A House Divided" | October 25, 2022 |
| 51 | 6 | "The Trojan Slooshie" | October 25, 2022 |
| 52 | 7 | "Born to Direct" | October 25, 2022 |
| 53 | 8 | "The Wexler Deflector Conjecture" | October 25, 2022 |
| 54 | 9 | "Billy to the Maxx" | October 25, 2022 |
| 55 | 10 | "The Good, the Bad… and the Turtles" | October 25, 2022 |
| 56 | 11 | "Day of the Dread" | November 22, 2022 |
| 57 | 12 | "Mr. Produce Buys the Farm" | November 22, 2022 |
| 58 | 13 | "This Land is Harl's Land" | November 22, 2022 |
| 59 | 14 | "Shirley Overdrive" | November 22, 2022 |
| 60 | 15 | "Yes, No, Maybe So" | November 22, 2022 |
| 61 | 16 | "Grizzled and Grizzled-er" | November 22, 2022 |
| 62 | 17 | "Freya, Basically" | November 22, 2022 |
| 63 | 18 | "Where in the World is Sheep Wheeler?" | November 22, 2022 |
| 64 | 19 | "King Fendrich I" | November 22, 2022 |
| 65 | 20 | "King Fendrich II" | November 22, 2022 |

== Critical reception ==
Lego City Adventures has received favourable comments from critics about its positive messages but has also been criticised for its consumerism. Reviewer Emily Ashby for Common Sense Media gave the show a three-star rating, commenting that, "despite the fact that this series doubles as a pretty effective advertising campaign for the Lego brand/merchandise, it's a genuinely funny show with fast-paced, unpredictable humor". TV Guide UK gave the show a rating of 6/10.

== Merchandise ==
Lego City Adventures was produced to accompany the Lego City theme, a core product of The Lego Group. According to a Lego announcement, the series was designed as, "an important evolution of Lego City" that aimed to, "bring the unique characters, style and humor of Lego City Adventures to life".
