= Lego Friends =

Lego theme

- Logo used since 2023
- Subject: Five best friends (2012–2022); Eight best friends (2023–present)
- Availability: 5 May 2012–present
- Total sets: 656
- Characters: Andrea, Emma, Mia, Olivia, and Stephanie (2012); Aliya, Autumn, Leo, Liann, Nova, Olly, Paisley, and Zac (2023)
- Official website

Lego Friends is a line of Lego construction toys marketed for girls. The toy line utilizes slightly larger and more detailed "mini-doll" figures in place of the usual Lego minifigures.

== Overview ==
Launched in 2012, the Lego theme features five core characters named Andrea, Emma, Mia, Olivia, and Stephanie. To feature a more diverse set of characters, the theme was later relaunched in January 2023 with Aliya, Autumn, Leo, Liann, Nova, Olly, Paisley, and Zac. Lego Friends is set in the fictional town of Heartlake City, where sets depict scenes from the character's day-to-day lives. The sets are accompanied by a CGI-animated series, Lego Friends, which debuted in 2012. Each character's personality is built around a specific interest, such as animals, cosmetics, or pop music. Playsets are designed to depict locations where the character might spend their day-to-day life, such as houses, cars, or locations tied to their interest. The Lego Friends characters are represented by the line's distinct "mini-doll" figures in place of the usual Lego minifigures, a feature that is shared with Lego's previous girl-focused theme, Belville, who are similar to Lego Friends, except they were non-customizable. While the mini-dolls of Belville and Lego Friends are considered more "life-like" than Lego's minifigures, the Lego Friends pieces are compatible with other Lego products. Lego Friends also introduced a range of new Lego brick colors, including purple, lavender, teal and turquoise.

The launch of Lego Friends sets in 2012 was one of Lego's biggest successes: in addition to doubling sales expectations, it also widened Lego's customer base within the girls' sector. Despite receiving initial criticism regarding its representation of girls and their interests, the line has consistently performed well and has been regularly listed as one of the Lego Group's best-selling themes.

== Characters ==
=== 2012–2022 (Original) ===
Prior to January 2023, Lego Friends focused on five teenage girls from the fictional town of Heartlake City. Each character had a distinctive personality illustrated by her favorite activities, along with their own pets.

- Andrea – A confident and charismatic character who loves to sing. She loves being the center of attention and dreams of being a popstar. She has a pet bird called Pepper.
- Emma – A creative and imaginative character who expresses herself through her art. She is known to love cheese, be the silliest of the group, and is shown to be quite intelligent. She had a pet cat called Chico.
- Mia – An animal lover who enjoys the outdoors. She has a sarcastic tone and does anything to protect the wilderness. She had a pet rabbit called Twister.
- Olivia – A curious character with a passion for science. She was the new girl in town, and her intelligence and enthusiasm for learning allowed her to stand out. She had a pet hamster called Rumble.
- Stephanie – A sporty character who loves fitness and sees everything as a competition. She is also fond of baking, especially cupcakes. She has a pet dog called Dash.

=== 2023–Present ===
- Aliya – A high achiever who enjoys homework and extracurricular activities. She also volunteers at an animal shelter.
- Autumn – An adventurer who likes to build campfires, catch fish, and construct makeshift shelters. She does not have forearm from being born with a limb difference.
- Leo – A cook who enjoys helping his grandmother in the kitchen. He has a pet cat named Churro.
- Liann – A famous comic book illustrator.
- Nova – A famous influencer and gamer. She has a pet dog called Pickle.
- Olly – A fashion designer.
- Paisley – A singer who struggles with stage fright.
- Zac – A jokester who likes motocross, martial arts, and extreme sports.

== Development ==
Before the launch of the Lego Friends range, the Lego Group had originally targeted both genders with its marketing as commercials from 1955 depicted both young boys and girls playing with their toys. Lego in the following years continued to introduce girl-centered products to follow their themes of inclusivity:

- In 1974, the Lego minifigure was introduced, with female minifigure models introduced two months after their male counterparts.
- By 1979, the company had begun to specifically target girls with the launch of Scala jewelry.
- In 1981, a young girl holding her Lego creation was showcased in a Lego advert.
- In 1994, the Belville product line was introduced for specifically young girls, which focused on a fairytale theme and did not include minifigures or buildable toys.
- Scala was then reintroduced in 1997 and brought a strong emphasis on gender roles with it.

The cover of the 1999 Lego Friends game

In October 1999, Lego released a computer game for Windows PC titled Lego Friends. The game followed five girls as they "do all the things [girls] enjoy most -- from being part of a girls 'gang' to playing in a band." According to Lego, this game "was created as a sort of experiment, the byproduct of research conducted by Elena Catón in 1997 for the Lego Group into some concerns the company had about the demographics of its toys."

Years of additional research into the Lego customer base revealed that 90% of Lego sets sold were aimed at boys. This meant that there was a huge untapped market of girls who were not using Lego. Lego spokesman Michael McNally, reported that, "Seeing that the play pattern was really skewing so heavily toward boys, we wanted to understand why. We embarked on four years of global research with 4,500 girls and their moms. Some of the things we heard were really surprising and challenging in ways that weren't really comfortable for us as a brand."

The research showed that boys and girls play very differently and construct different worlds of play. McNally noted that, "The boys immediately grabbed the figures and the horses and the catapults and they started having a battle". By contrast, the girls were more focused on the structure. "They all looked around inside the castle and they said, 'Well, there's nothing inside'. This idea of interior versus exterior in the orientation of how they would then play with what they built was really interesting. If you think about most of the Lego models that people consider to be meant for boys, there's not a whole lot going on in there. But [the girls had] this idea of, 'There's nothing inside to do.'"

The Lego Friends line was developed to target the girl's market. The Lego Group conducted extensive ethnographic research, which aimed to identify girls' preferences. Friends model designer, Mauricio Affonso, commented, "One of the main things was they couldn't really relate to the minifigure, it's too blocky. Boys tend to be a lot more about good versus evil, whereas girls really see themselves through the mini doll. They wanted a greater level of detail, proportions and realism".

The research also showed a difference in the way that girls assemble Lego sets. McNally commented, "One of the things we learned in the research was that—where boys were perfectly happy going through two hours assembling a single structure—girls were much more interested in small bite-sized assembly that provided a role-play opportunity, before then building again".

== Launch ==
The Lego Friends toy line was launched in January 2012 in North America (December 2011 in France), with the release of 14 sets. The first wave afterwards contained 23 sets. In the initial release, the larger sets included the Heartlake Vet, City Park Cafe, and Butterfly Beauty Shop. Smaller sets in the initial wave included vehicle and hobby-themed kits, such as Stephanie's Cool Convertible and Olivia's Invention Workshop.

=== Success ===
Lego Friends is one of Lego's biggest successes. At launch, the line doubled sales expectations, with sales to girls tripling in the same year. In the first six months of 2012, The Lego Group's net profit rose 35% to 2bn kroner (£213m), partially driven by the success of the Friends line. This success caused other construction-set companies such as Mega Bloks to introduce girl dolls. Following the launch of Lego Friends, sales in the girls' market were growing as much as 20% each year. Three years after the launch, Lego achieved sixth place in the list of gifts that girls wanted most for Christmas, according to a survey by the National Retail Federation.

Lego Friends has also reappeared in The Lego Group's annual report as one of its five top-selling themes, most recently in 2016, 2018, 2019 and 2020. Lego's chief operating officer, Bali Padda, remarked, "We tried reaching into the girls' audience a number of times over the last 15, 20 years, and this is the first time, with Friends, that we've had true success". On September 28, 2022, The Lego Group reported that Lego Friends, alongside Lego Star Wars, Lego Technic, Lego Icons (formerly Creator Expert), Lego City, and Lego Harry Potter were the top earning themes for the six months ending June 30, 2022.

== Reception ==
=== Controversy ===
The Lego Friends theme received initial criticism for its reinforcement of gender stereotypes. Campaign groups in both the UK and the US particularly disliked the use of pink in the product range, as well as the activities the characters were given felt stereotypical. Abi Moore of UK campaign group Pinkstinks remarked, "We want toys that offer all sorts of opportunities to all children. We think that cupcakes, parties and having everything revolve around leisure is just tiresome and heavily stereotyped." In the US, a petition launched by the Spark movement achieved 50,000 signatures with the aim of pressuring The Lego Group to change its marketing strategy.

The slim figures of the Friends characters have drawn additional criticism from eating disorder specialists. The Campaign for a Commercial-Free Childhood nominated Lego Friends for a TOADY award, a "worst toy" award whose acronym stands for "Toys Oppressive And Destructive to Young Children." The Campaign declared that the Lego Friends line was "so jam-packed with condescending stereotypes it would even make Barbie blush." In response, the Lego group has stated that the line was result of 3,000 girls who wanted to find relevance in Lego construction sets.

Lego spokesman Michael McNally commented, "There were a lot of people at the beginning who said, 'They've dumbed it down, it's not nearly as complicated [as the original Lego], it's special for girls because they don't think girls can build. The reality is, just about piece for piece, there are just as many pieces required to put something together [among Friends sets]." McNally defended the Lego Friends product line against its critics by stating, "I think there's been a lot of momentum around this idea that everything should be gender neutral. That's not what we're striving for. We don't see anything wrong with the natural ways that children are choosing to play. We try being gender inclusive."

In 2014, a letter written by a 7-year-old girl expressed further criticism about the nature of the girls' activities in Lego sets. The Lego Group responded with the release of a Research Institute play set which included an all-female trio of a palaeontologist, an astronomer, and a chemist.

== Relaunch ==
In October 2022, The Lego Group announced the relaunch of the brand, which introduced eight new characters in January 2023 named Aliya, Autumn, Leo, Liann, Nova, Olly, Paisley, and Zac. The lineup represents a new generation of characters accompanied by a new series. The Lego Group stated that it had been working with the Geena Davis Institute to present greater diversity. The new sets were launched on January 1, 2023. The new characters were created to offer greater representation by featuring a variety of skin tones, disabilities, cultures and neurodiversity. Unlike the first lineup, the main characters of the relaunch include male characters.

== Toy line ==
=== Construction sets ===
Following the initial launch, Lego Friends sets have been released in waves and have expanded on the various interests of the characters and their friends. These have included various interests, such as agriculture, equestrianism, wildlife animal rescue, rehabilitation, and pop stardom. The range has also included suburbia-themed sets, as well as an amusement park. The largest sets since the original wave have been the Summer Riding Camp, Heartlake Shopping Mall, and Heartlake Grand Hotel. According to Bricklink, there have been a total of 568 Lego Friends sets released since January 2012.

- In 2018, the Lego Friends line announced some physical changes to the main characters, which according to The Lego Group, were made in response towards children's feedback. The changes were to make the characters more diverse in their appearance and to add more depth to their personality.
- In 2020, The Lego Group partnered with National Geographic to release several construction sets that focused on environmental issues. The Lego Friends line launched construction sets that centered on animal protection. The sets included Baby Elephant Jungle Rescue, Jungle Rescue Base, and Panda Jungle Tree House sets.
- In 2021, Lego Friends launched a range of play cubes. Each cube includes a small brick build, a mini-doll and a pet animal, and is designed for ages 6+.
- In April 2021, five sets were announced for release in summer 2021, including Forest Waterfall, Forest House, Heartlake City Grand Hotel, Tree House and Horse Training and Trailer.
- In May 2021, Fenella Charity, design director and creative lead of Lego Friends discussed about Olivia's Electric Car set and explained, "Lego Friends is grounded in the real world, so as designers we take our cues from what kids experience in their everyday lives," and continued, "We have a responsibility to let kids experiment and learn about topics that they are interested in and celebrate and inspire kids on the way the world could be."
- In September 2021, Matthew Ashton, The Lego Group's vice president of design, announced that Lego Friends alongside City, Creator, Classic, Technic, Speed Champions, Monkie Kid, Ninjago, Collectible Minifigures and DOTS themes will continue until at least 2023.
- In January 2022, the Lego Friends brand celebrated its tenth anniversary. The Lego Group released eight new sets to celebrate a decade of friendship.
- In May 1, 2022, The Lego Group partnered with NASA to release a construction set titled Olivia's Space Academy.
- In May 2022, 12 new sets were announced for release in summer 2022, including Emma's Art School, Andrea's Theatre School, Stephanie's Sailing Adventure, and Mia's Wildlife Rescue.
- In August 2022, Lego Friends Advent Calendar was announced for release on September 1, 2022. The set contains 312 pieces with four mini-doll figures. The set includes Lego mini-doll figures of Santa, Olivia, and two micro-dolls.
- In October 2022, five new sets were announced for release on January 1, 2023, including Paisley's House, Dog Rescue Center, Heartlake Downtown Diner, Autumn's House, and Heartlake International School.

=== Fusion ===
Resort Designer was released on September 1, 2014 as part of the Lego Fusion theme. The set consists of 263 pieces, a Fusion capture plate and one mini-doll figure. It enables children to create a 2D house model by placing bricks on the Fusion capture plate, scanning with a smartphone or tablet and playing with the Lego Fusion Resort Designer app to unlock game levels. The set includes a mini-doll figure of Olivia. The Lego Fusion Resort Designer app includes game levels for the Lego Friends theme. The set was designed primarily for girls aged 7 to 12 years old.

== Animated series, web shorts and TV specials ==
Animated series, TV specials, and Films based on Lego Friends have been released to accompany the product line. The story follows the adventures of the original cast in their hometown of Heartlake City. The toy line is also accompanied by a series of animated short films released on YouTube.

=== Series ===
==== Friends of Heartlake City ====
Friends of Heartlake City is a CGI-animated television series that debuted on 3 November 2013. Each episode had a runtime of 25 minutes.

==== Friends: The Power of Friendship ====
Lego Friends: The Power of Friendship aired on Netflix on 4 March 2016. The series includes two seasons with four episodes.

==== Friends: Girls on a Mission ====
Friends: Girls on a Mission is a 2018 CGI-animated television series on Family Channel in Canada, on KidsClick and later Kabillion in the United States, Pop in the United Kingdom and Ireland, Super RTL in Germany, and TVNZ in New Zealand. The series premiered on 25 October 2018 and has continued for four seasons.

==== Friends: The Next Chapter ====
Friends: The Next Chapter is a 2023 animated web series on YouTube. The first season premiered on March 26, 2023. A second season premiered on June 13, 2024. These seasons' episodes both had a runtime of 22 minutes. A third season premiered on May 9, 2025, where these episodes' runtimes were shortened to 11 minutes.

=== TV specials ===
==== Friends: Holiday Special ====
Friends: Holiday Special is a 21-minute television special that premiered in YouTube on 6 November 2021.

==== Friends: Heartlake Stories ====
In 2022, four TV specials for Friends: Heartlake Stories were released on YouTube, including Fitting In, Plight of the Bumblebee, Wet Wallop and The Final Countdown. Those shorts made their linear premiere on the Disney Channel on August 21, 2022.

==== Friends: The Next Chapter New Beginnings ====
Friends: The Next Chapter New Beginnings is a 44-minute television special that premiered in YouTube on 29 January 2023.

==== Friends: Heartlake the Musical ====
In July 2025, Kenny Ortega was announced as an executive producer to a live action television musical based on the Lego Friends theme. Set for a 2026 release, the plot details a girl's magical transportation into Heartlake City after having constructed the Lego brick world. Ortega was later revealed to also be the special's director. Principal photography took place in August 2025 in London. The cast was revealed on October 7, 2026 and a trailer revealing the special's title released on October 9. It released on YouTube and Peacock in the United States and internationally on Netflix and Tubi on October 16, 2026.

=== Films ===
In February 2016, Warner Bros. released a Lego Friends film on Blu-ray titled Lego Friends: Girlz 4 Life. This animated film follows the story of popstar, Livi, who comes to Heartlake City. The Friends characters are forced to devise a plan when Livi's manager steals their hit song called Girlz.

The Lego Friends line made a prominent appearance in the 2019 film The Lego Movie 2: The Second Part, during scenes set within the SyStar System.

=== Critical reception ===
The Lego Friends animated series has been praised for its positive role models and messaging, but criticised for its consumerism. Reviewer, Emily Ashby for Common Sense Media gave the series a two-star rating, commenting that, "The characters are five strong, big-hearted teen girls who are good examples of the value of friendship. Social rivalry and other troubles arise in each story, but the girls overcome them in ways that celebrate cooperation, responsibility, and individuality."

The review also stated that, "this somewhat plodding series feels more like an extended commercial than it does a solid contender for kids' attention".

== Other media ==
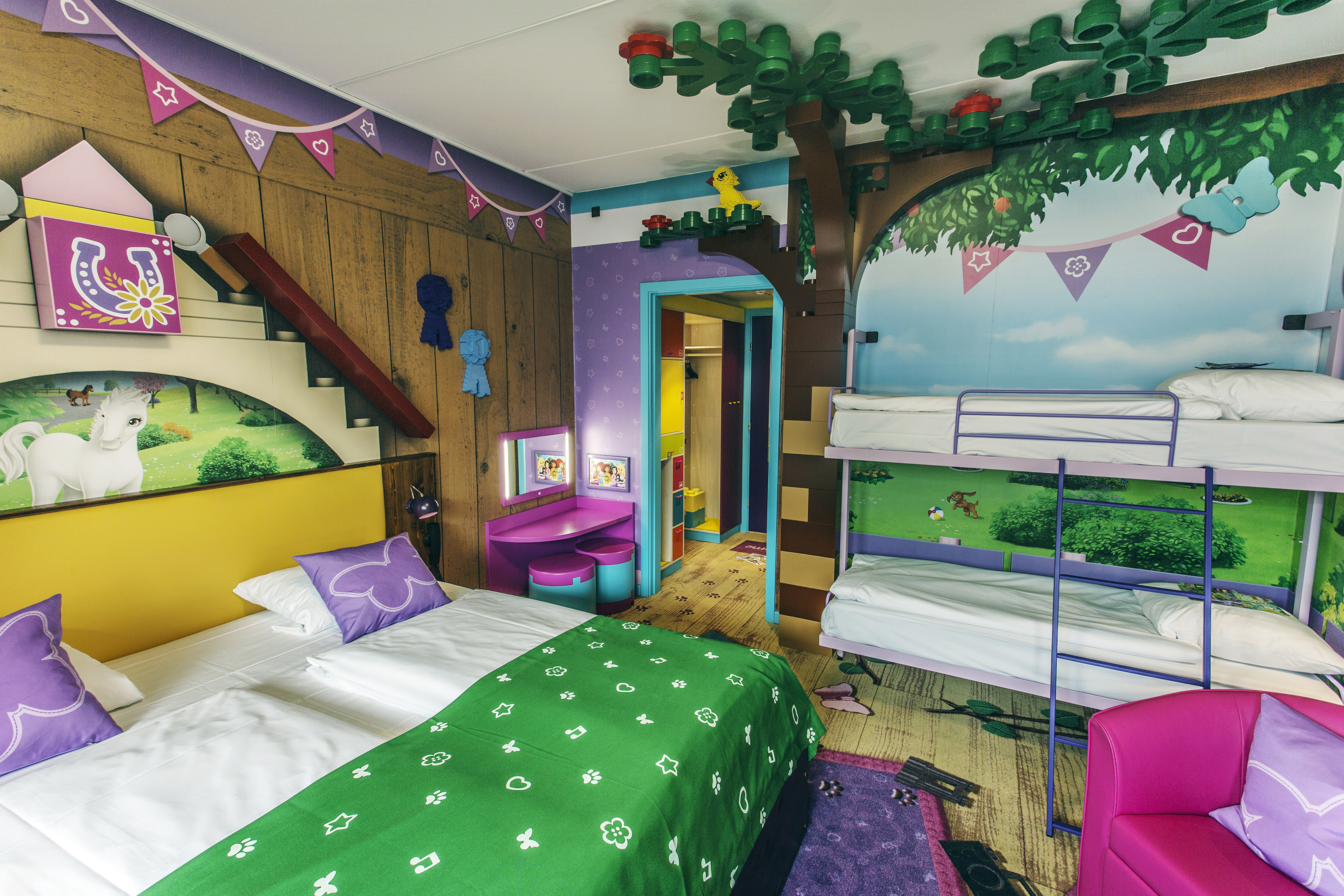
Hotel room in Lego Friends theme at Hotel Legoland

=== Books ===
In June 2012, two books based on the Friends theme were released. Lego Friends: Welcome to Heartlake City and Lego Friends: Perfect Pet Show were released on June 18 by DK. DK also released a Lego Brickmaster book based on the Friends theme on September 17 of the same year.

=== Video games and apps ===
==== Lego Friends video game ====
Lego Friends is a Lego-themed life simulation video game developed by Hellbent Games and published by Warner Bros. Interactive Entertainment, which is based on the Lego Friends theme. The game was first released for Nintendo 3DS systems on 12 November 2013, and for Nintendo DS systems on 8 April 2014. The game was later released for iOS devices on 31 July 2014.

==== Lego Friends Heartlake Rush ====
Lego Friends Heartlake Rush is a 3D driving game that was developed by Lego System A/S and is designed for children aged 4+. Players choose one of the Friends characters and navigate through a series of road obstacles. The game was released on iOS and Google Play.

=== Magazine ===
In July 2014, the Lego Friends brand launched a monthly children's magazine, published by Immediate Media. Editions of the magazine were regularly published over the course of six and a half years, until it was discontinued with Issue 78. According to the Audit Bureau of Circulations (ABC), the magazine had achieved an average circulation of 22,468 between January and June 2020, which was lower than the Lego City magazine at 33,677 and the Lego Ninjago magazine at 54,423. The magazine had also received some controversy over its content in 2019, when a comic strip was criticised for sexist characterisation.

In January 2022, the Lego Friends magazine was relaunched in the UK by Signature Publishing.

=== Theme park attractions ===
In 2015, a Friends themed land was introduced to Legoland California, named Lego Friends Heartlake City, featuring a splash area, Lego models of the characters, a meet and greet area and a 15-minute live show. In the same year, a themed land was opened at Legoland Windsor Resort, featuring a live show and Heartlake City Express Train. Heartlake City also made its debut at Legoland Florida in May 2015, when a themed area of the park was launched featuring two attractions named Mia's Riding Adventure and Heartlake Mall theater. A Lego Friends themed land is scheduled for the upcoming launch of Legoland Shanghai Resort in 2024.

== Awards and nominations ==
- In 2012, Olivia's House was awarded "DreamToys" in the Construction category by the Toy Retailers Association.
- In 2013, Dolphin Cruiser was awarded "DreamToys" in the Granny Knows Best category by the Toy Retailers Association.
- In 2013, Lego Friends was awarded "Toy of the Year" and also "Activity Toy of the Year" by the Toy Association.
- In 2014, Heartlake Shopping Mall was awarded "DreamToys" in the Build The World category by the Toy Retailers Association.
- In 2016, Amusement Park Roller Coaster was awarded "DreamToys" in the Action Station category by the Toy Retailers Association.
- In 2017, the Lego Friends Amusement Park Roller Coaster was awarded "Toy of the Year" and "Construction Toy of the Year" by the Toy Association.
- In 2019, Rescue Mission Boat was awarded "DreamToys" in the Trains, Planes and Automobiles category by the Toy Retailers Association.
- In 2020, Jungle Rescue Base was awarded "DreamToys" in the Crafty Kids category by the Toy Retailers Association.
- In 2021, Forest Camper Van and Sailboat was awarded "DreamToys" in the Everybody's Building category by the Toy Retailers Association.
- In 2021, Heartlake City Shopping Mall was listed as one of the "Top 10 toys for Christmas 2021" by Tesco.
- In 2023, Heartlake Downtown Diner was awarded the "Hero Toy Award" at the London Toy Fair 2023.

== See also ==
- Belville (Lego)
- Lego Disney
- Lego Elves
- Lego DC Superhero Girls
- Lego Fusion
- Lego Juniors
- Lego Unikitty!
- Lego Gabby's Dollhouse
