= Lego Friends (1999 video game) =

- Developer: Ivanoff Interactive
- Publisher: Lego Media
- Platform: Microsoft Windows
- Release: 1999
- Genre: Music
- Mode: Single player

Lego Friends is a music video game developed by Ivanoff Interactive and published by Lego Media in 1999 for Windows PCs. Even though the game is a Lego game, it doesn't feature anything to do with the bricks, minifigures or building. The game is instead based on Lego's girls toy line Scala. It features 5 girls, who are apart of a band called Tuff Stuff, and the player's objective is to help them make songs. First, the player must enter their name, create a password for their save file, and then enter a friend's name before beginning the actual game in the fictional town of Sunnyvale. It also includes a printable album and an interview with the Loose Chippin's, an all-female British pop band.

== Gameplay ==
The player helps the band Tuff Stuff prepare a stage show in the town of Sunnyvale by creating music, choreographing dance routines, and designing stage backdrops. Music is created by arranging instrument samples into a sequence, while dance routines and backdrop displays are assembled by placing movements and images into similar sequence grids. The player explores multiple locations around town, follows storylines involving the band members and their friends, receives guidance through phone messages, takes photographs, and records pictures, events, and thoughts in a scrapbook and diary. After completing the music, dance, and stage designs, the band performs the show at the auditorium before an audience.

== Reception ==
Reception

Review scores
Publication	Score
FamilyPC	84%
The Register-Guard	3/4
