= Lego Elves =

Lego theme

- Subject: Elves
- Licensed from: The Lego Group
- Availability: 2015–2018
- Total sets: 41
- Characters: Emily Jones; Azari Firedancer; Farran Leafshade; Naida Riverheart; Aira Windwhistler; Sophie Jones
- TV series: Lego Elves; Lego Elves: Secrets of Elvendale; Lego Elves Webisodes
- Official website

Lego Elves is a discontinued Lego product line produced by The Lego Group that was launched in 2015. The product line was based on the storyline of accompanying animated series on Disney Channel, the Lego YouTube channel, and Netflix which follow the adventures of a character named Emily Jones who travels to a magical land called Elvendale. It went through a reboot at one point, where the animation had the characters with typical Lego-figurine-styled hands. The theme aimed to introduce a fantasy element to girl-focused Lego products. It was discontinued in 2018.

== Overview ==
The Lego Elves theme was underpinned by the storyline of its accompanying animated series. The Lego Elves animated television series began with a mini movie special titled Unite The Magic. An animated webisode series was released on the Lego YouTube channel. An animated series titled Lego Elves: Secrets of Elvendale was produced and aired by Netflix. Both the Lego toy line and the animated series targeted the girls market. The series focus on a human girl named Emily Jones, who inherits a magical amulet from her grandmother and travels through a portal to a magical realm called Elvendale. The storyline relates how she meets four elves with elemental powers (fire, earth, wind and water) with whom she fights against evil forces, and who help her to return home.

== Development ==
Following the success of Lego Friends and Lego Disney, The Lego Group aimed to launch another Lego theme targeted at the girls market. In contrast to the contemporary setting of Lego Friends, Lego Elves aimed to introduce a fantasy setting into girl-focused Lego toys. The theme was developed after testing several story ideas with girls around the world.

== Launch ==
The Lego Elves theme was announced on 12 February 2015 at the American International Toy Fair. The toy line began with the release of eight toy construction sets that introduced the four main elves and their home environments which began to launch in March 2015. An official teaser for the animated series was released on the Lego YouTube channel on 15 December 2014. This was followed by the release of a trailer on 19 February 2015.

== Characters ==
=== Main Five ===
- Emily Jones (voiced by Ashleigh Ball) is the protagonist, a resourceful, modest, amicable, and affectionate human girl, whose "element" is love.
- Azari Firedancer (voiced by Erin Mathews) is a fire elf who is spontaneous, extroverted, loud, sometimes reckless, and usually cheerful.
- Farran Leafshade (voiced by Kyle Rideout) is an earth elf who is honest, loyal, reliable, and slightly self-important and has a crush on Aira.
- Aira Windwhistler (voiced by Ashleigh Ball) is a wind elf who is good-natured, excitable, light-hearted and whose favourite pastime is the construction of machines.
- Naida Riverheart (voiced by Erin Mathews) is a water elf who is patient, modest, slightly shy, but courageous.

=== Humans ===
- Sophie Jones (voiced by Rebecca Husain) is Emily's younger sister. She is captured by the Goblin King as bait to lure Emily to him.
- Mrs. Jones (voiced by Ashleigh Ball) is Emily and Sophie's mother.
- Mr. Jones is Emily and Sophie's father.

=== The Five Sisters ===
- The Five Sisters is a legendary group of powerful elves. They created a portal from Elvendale to Earth, so that elves and humans could learn from each other. Together, the five dedicated their lives to protecting their realm and all of its inhabitants.
  - Emily's grandmother was immortal while she lived in Elvendale, she represented the "element" of love. However, when she moved to Earth to guard the portal from that side, she became mortal and eventually died.
  - Skyra, a wind elf, remained at her mysterious sky castle to guard the Elvendale side of the portal.
  - Quartzine, an earth elf, became imprisoned in her amulet after turning evil. She is the mother of Cronan Darkroot, the Goblin King.
  - Unnamed water elf and fire elf. The whereabouts of the water and fire sisters are currently unknown.

=== Elves ===
- Johnny Baker (voiced by Kyle Rideout) is a fire elf and pastry chef who works at a bakery located in the lava fields of Elvendale.
- Tidus Stormsurfer (voiced by Vincent Tong) is a water elf who runs Elvendale's School of Dragons as the dragon trainer.
- Sira Copperbranch (voiced by Racquel Belmonte) is an earth elf who runs the Starlight Inn. She is known as The Sky Captain of Elvendale, and is friends with Tidus Stormsurfer. Not a typical earth elf, she loves flying and has her own airship.
- Cronan Darkroot / Goblin King (voiced by Riley Murdock) is an earth elf. After losing his mother to the dark power of her amulet, he vows to bring her back by stealing Emily's amulet, which will allow him to open a portal to Earth. He is known as the Goblin King and has a number of goblin minions. He is Emily and Sophie's first cousin once removed due to his mother, Quartzine, being one of the Five Sisters.
- Rosalyn Nightshade (voiced by Nicole Oliver) is a water elf who is also a healer. She is the former queen of the forest, who was tricked by Cronan Darkroot and overthrown. She has some of the most powerful potions in Elvendale.
- Ragana Shadowflame (voiced by Heather Doerksen) is a fire elf and main antagonist of the series. Having weak powers, she drinks from the Shadow Fountain to gain power and becomes evil. She has two animal minions: a cat named Jynx and a fox named Dusti.
- Lumia (voiced by Rhona Rees) is a light elf and a shape-shifter who can transform into animals such as an eagle and a wolf.
- Noctura (voiced by Erin Mathews) is a dark elf who is a bat-themed shape-shifter. She has a number of bat minions who aid in her wicked schemes.

=== Goblins ===
(voiced by Scott McNeil and Kathleen Barr)

- Barblin loves his balloon ship and is a great pilot and mechanic. He adores the ship’s Captain Dukelin and tries to make him happy. It is hard to tell if Barblin is being mind-controlled by the Goblin King or just follows orders to make others happy.
- Bieblin is very happy with his life, thinks he is the most awesome goblin, and always carries a snack. He is lazy and selfish unless it has something to do with food or music. He loves to entertain by playing his guitar and singing his own songs.
- Dukelin found his true calling as right hand and commander of the Goblin King when he took over the goblin village. Dukelin is the captain of the balloon ship and an intelligent engineer. He always thinks the other goblins are talking behind his back, which they are.
- Fibblin loves a good cup of tea and discussing the latest goblin gossip, in fact he starts most of the rumors in the village. He is a great craftsman and designs complicated machines in his workshop and he builds traps for the Goblin King to use.
- Guxlin loves nature and gardening, he supplies the goblin village with fresh fruits and vegetables. He is intelligent and skilled at making things grow. He is a hard worker and believes in getting the job done but can be selfish about his own interests (growing plants).
- Jimblin says no to everything. Not to offend anyone, but because to him it has many meanings. He doesn’t know many words, and doesn’t care. He even says no to the Goblin King, which makes him an easy target if the King is in a bad mood. Jimblin is small but very strong.
- Rimlin is the youngest goblin. He is great at making things look beautiful and super cute. He has a heart of gold, but is simple-minded, easily forgets things, and doesn’t always know when he’s in danger. Turning him evil doesn’t seem to work as well as the Goblin King had hoped.
- Roblin is an excellent thief who loves shiny, beautiful, and magical things. He spends all day searching for fantastic objects to take, and then hiding them so nobody else will find them. He moves like a black magic cat to get in and out of the strangest places to find or hide objects.
- Smilin really loves to sleep, which makes him a pretty useless guard. You could say he’s a dreamer, but watch out, he is super grumpy when he does eventually wake up.
- Tufflin took the full brunt of the Goblin King’s evil spell and has gone quite mad. He is always angry and picks fights with everyone and everything in the village – even inanimate objects. He has a great imagination, but now always imagines someone is plotting to attack him, so he deals the first blow.

=== Animals ===
- Flamy the fox
- Panthara the panther
- Unnamed mouse
- Firebolt the pegasus (pulls the fire chariot)
- Zonya the fire dragon
- Spark the baby dragon
- Mr. Spry the squirrel
- Mrs. Spry the squirrel
- Hidee the chameleon
- Enki the panther
- Thorne the earth dragon
- Floria the baby dragon
- Ashwing the dragon
- Pluma the bird
- Sebastian the bird
- Owlyver the owl
- Nascha the owl
- Golden Glow the pegasus (companion of Skyra)
- Starshine and Rufus the pegasi (pull Aira’s sleigh)
- Gust the wind dragon
- Miku the toddler dragon
- Fledge the baby dragon
- Blubeary the bear
- Lil’ Blue the baby bear
- Delphia the dolphin
- Calypso the baby turtle
- Merina the water dragon
- Sapphire the water dragon
- Lula the baby dragon
- Rayne the baby dragon
- Elandra the Queen Dragon
- Estari the baby dragon
- Noctura’s bat minions: Crase, Furi, Hippo, Molo, Myzo, Phyll, Vespe
- Jynx the shadow cat
- Dusti the shadow fox

==== The Five Elemental Guardians ====
The Elemental Guardians are a group of giant, mystical creatures who protect the elemental diamonds of Elvendale. These jewels are the source of all elemental magic.

- Rowan the Guardian Fire Lion
- Liska the Guardian Earth Fox
- Cyclo the Guardian Wind Dragon
- Cory the Guardian Water Turtle
- Lumia the Guardian Light Elf

==== The Shadow Creature ====
The Shadow Creature is an entity of darkness who aids The Goblin King in his quest for power. It can drain the life-force from creatures and the environment. It is also a shapeshifter and has used the following forms:

- Giant bird
- Raven
- Octopus
- Cobra-like serpent
- Mouse
- Arachnid
- Bear
- Giant lizard
- Cat

== Toy line ==
According to BrickLink, between 2015 and 2018 The Lego Group released 33 toy construction sets, two polybag sets and six foil pack sets for the Lego Elves theme. The product line was discontinued in 2018.

The construction sets released each year were developed around a different storyline (which were reflected in the four seasons of the webisodes). The printed clothing featured on the "main five" mini dolls changed with each storyline; storyline four featured an armored look with designs representing each Elemental Guardian.

- Storyline One focused on Emily Jones traveling to Elvendale, meeting the elves, and trying to get back home.
- Storyline Two was about saving dragons from the evil elf witch Ragana.
- Storyline Three was about Emily’s younger sister Sophie being captured by Cronan Darkroot, the Goblin King.
- Storyline Four was about rescuing the Elemental Guardians from the dark elf Noctura.

=== 2015 sets ===
In March 2015, eight playsets were announced for the 2015 waves. Wave One: Aira's Creative Workshop, Naida's Spa Secret, Naida's Epic Adventure Ship, Azari and the Magical Bakery, The Elves' Treetop Hideaway, Farran and the Crystal Hollow. Wave Two: Aira's Pegasus Sleigh and Skyra's Mysterious Sky Castle. In addition, Azari's Magic Fire polybag set was released as a promotion.

=== 2016 sets ===
In March 2016, ten playsets were announced for the 2016 waves. Wave Three: Emily Jones and the Baby Wind Dragon, The Water Dragon Adventure, Elvendale School of Dragons, The Starlight Inn, Fire Dragon's Lava Cave, The Secret Market Place. Wave Four: The Precious Crystal Mine, The Dragon Sanctuary, Queen Dragon's Rescue and Ragana's Magic Shadow Castle. In addition, Sira's Adventurous Airglider polybag set was released as a promotion.

=== 2017 sets ===
In February 2017 at New York Toy Fair, eight playsets were announced for the 2017 waves. Wave Five: Naida’s Gondola and the Goblin Thief, The Capture of Sophie Jones, The Goblin King’s Evil Dragon, Aira’s Airship and the Amulet Chase, Magic Rescue from the Goblin Village. Wave Six: Azari and The Goblin Forest Escape, Rosalyn's Healing Hideout, Breakout from the Goblin King's Fortress.

=== 2018 sets ===
In January 2018, seven playsets were announced as part of the 2018 waves. Wave Seven: Emily Jones and The Eagle Getaway, Naida and The Water Turtle Ambush, Azari and the Fire Lion Capture, Aira and the Song of the Wind Dragon, Noctura's Tower and the Earth Fox Rescue. Wave Eight: Emily and Noctura’s Showdown, The Elvenstar Tree Bat Attack.

=== Polybag Sets ===
Azari's Magic Fire (2015) and Sira's Adventurous Airglider (2016).

=== Foil Pack Animal Collectable Sets ===
Six small limited edition LEGO sets were produced for inclusion with issues of the Lego Elves magazine. Each set included an animal figure from the Lego Elves toy line: Enki the panther, Flamy the Fox, Miku the baby dragon, Jynx the elven witch Ragana’s cat, Mr. Spry the squirrel, and Hidee the chameleon.

=== Other Merchandise ===
- A double-sided playmat was produced that depicted land and water scenery from the land of Elvendale.
- A shelf and drawer unit with playmat called Me and My Dragon Display was produced to display and store the toys.
- Six mini-doll key chains/backpack charms were produced featuring Emily Jones, Azari Firedancer, Naida Riverheart, Aira Windwhistler, Fledge the baby dragon and Roblin the goblin.
- A hardcover book called Emily Jones’ Diary Sketch Book was released in 2016. The book featured images of Lego Elves characters in a hand-sketched style, and contained transfer paper, blank pages, and a map of Elvendale.
- A hardcover book called LEGO: Elves Journal Notebook was also produced. The book contained blank pages, and came with a 21-piece Lego build to create a "locking mechanism" for the book.

== Animated series ==
=== Lego Elves (2015–2016) ===
Lego Elves
- Also known as: Elves
- Written by: Barbara Haynes; Morten Brunbjerg; Villads Spangsberg
- Voices of: Ashleigh Ball; Erin Mathews; Kyle Rideout; Kathleen Barr; Riley Murdock; Scott McNeil; Rebecca Husain
- Country of origin: Denmark
- Original language: English

Production
- Production company: Ja Film

An animated television series, Lego Elves, was produced by Ja Film in Aarhus, Denmark. In the United States, the first special titled Unite The Magic aired on 8 March 2015 on Disney Channel. The second special titled Dragons To Save, Time To Be Brave aired on 6 March 2016 as a two part special on Disney Channel. The third special titled Down a Dark Path (a sequel to Dragons to Save, Time to be Brave) aired on 14 August 2016 on Disney Channel.

These specials (also referred to as episodes or mini movies) were released in conjunction with the webisodes released on the Lego YouTube channel.

Lego Elves Specials
| No. overall | No. in season | Title | Directed by | Written by | Original release date | U.S. viewers (millions) |
|---|---|---|---|---|---|---|
| TBA | 1 | "Unite the Magic" | Rune Christensen | Barbara Haynes | 8 March 2015 | N/A |
Shortly after the death of her grandmother, Emily Jones receives an amulet that teleports her to the parallel dimension of Elvendale. There, she befriends four elves who assist in her quest to return home. (takes place before the Season 1, Episode 1 webisode)
| TBA | 2 | "Dragons to Save, Time to be Brave" | Rune Christensen | Barbara Haynes | 6 March 2016 | N/A |
Emily and her elf friends rescue the Queen of the Dragons from evil elf Ragana. (aired in two parts, takes place before the Season 2, Episode 6 webisode)
| TBA | 3 | "Down a Dark Path" | Rune Christensen | Barbara Haynes | 14 August 2016 | N/A |
Ragana tries to corrupt Naida into becoming evil to cause discord among the elves. (takes place in the middle of the Season 2 webisodes)

==== Critical reception ====
Jenny Nixon for Common Sense Media gave the series a three-star rating, commenting, "This series is jam-packed with little girl bait - sparkling rainbow oceans, a flowing-haired Pegasus or three - and though the plot has a similar amount of depth, there's still something kind of fun about it. The quests Emily and her elf friends go on can be a tad generic, sure, but it's always nice to see a show with a high percentage of female characters, most of whom jump right in on the action and don't need a boy (or boy elf) to lead the way."

=== Lego Elves - Webisodes (2015–2018) ===
The Lego Elves webisodes were released on the Lego YouTube channel. The webisodes are grouped into four seasons. Season 1: Unite the Magic consists of webisodes 1 - 5. Season 2: Save the Dragons consists of webisodes 6 - 17. Season 3: The Capture of Sophie Jones consists of webisodes 18 - 33 and includes an unnumbered promo webisode "Did You Miss Us?" before webisode 18. Season 4: Into the Shadows consists of webisodes 1 - 15 (webisode numbering restarted at 1 for this season).

The webisodes from seasons 1 to 3 were later combined into webisode compilations. Webisode compilation 1 - 8 was released on 30 April 2018. Webisode compilation 9 - 17 was released on 7 May 2018. Webisode compilation 18 - 25 was released on 14 May 2018. Webisode compilation 26 - 33 was released on 21 May 2018. The 15 webisodes of Season 4 were released between March and August 2018, with a compilation of only webisodes 1 - 8 released on 4 June 2018.

Lego Elves Webisodes
| No. overall | No. in season | Title | Original air date |
|---|---|---|---|
Season 1 - Unite the Magic
| 1 | 1 | "Crushing It" | 6 July 2015 |
| 2 | 2 | "Crib Notes" | 6 July 2015 |
| 3 | 3 | "Elves Got Talent" | 8 July 2015 |
| 4 | 4 | "Never Cave" | 6 August 2015 |
| 5 | 5 | "Another Kind of Magic" | 3 November 2015 |
Season 2 - Save the Dragons
| 6 | 6 | "Safety First" | 4 March 2016 |
| 7 | 7 | "The Dragon Whisperer" | 4 March 2016 |
| 8 | 8 | "Drag Race" | 5 May 2016 |
| 9 | 9 | "Rumor Has It" | 7 May 2016 |
| 10 | 10 | "Born to Do It" | 9 May 2016 |
| 11 | 11 | "The Struggle Is Real" | 7 June 2016 |
| 12 | 12 | "No Pain Just Gain" | 13 June 2016 |
| 13 | 13 | "One Is More Fun" | 21 June 2016 |
| 14 | 14 | "Hairy Styles" | 21 June 2016 |
| 15 | 15 | "Point of View" | 27 July 2016 |
| 16 | 16 | "Crystal Clear" | 27 July 2016 |
| 17 | 17 | "Change From Within" | 27 July 2016 |
Season 3 - The Capture of Sophie Jones
| | Promo | Did You Miss Us? | 28 February 2017 |
| 18 | 18 | "Sophie's Capture" | 7 March 2017 |
| 19 | 19 | "Welcome to Elvendale" | 7 March 2017 |
| 20 | 20 | "Evil Apprentice" | 7 March 2017 |
| 21 | 21 | "How I Lost My Mother" | 7 March 2017 |
| 22 | 22 | "Goblin Talent Show" | 7 March 2017 |
| 23 | 23 | "How to Build a Sweet Ride" | 7 March 2017 |
| 24 | 24 | "Dragon Tale" | 7 March 2017 |
| 25 | 25 | "Teamwork" | 7 March 2017 |
| 26 | 26 | "Sophie's Point of View" | 10 August 2017 |
| 27 | 27 | "Queen of the Forest" | 10 August 2017 |
| 28 | 28 | "Potions in Motion" | 10 August 2017 |
| 29 | 29 | "Sizeable Refreshment" | 10 August 2017 |
| 30 | 30 | "Bring the Heat" | 10 August 2017 |
| 31 | 31 | "Goblin Intern" | 11 August 2017 |
| 32 | 32 | "The Confrontation" | 11 August 2017 |
| 33 | 33 | "The Final Battle" | 11 August 2017 |
Season 4 - Into the Shadows
| 34 | 1 | "The Enemy" | 12 March 2018 |
| 35 | 2 | "Toys in the Attic" | 12 March 2018 |
| 36 | 3 | "Relight My Fire" | 12 March 2018 |
| 37 | 4 | "The Light" | 9 April 2018 |
| 38 | 5 | "Focus" | 9 April 2018 |
| 39 | 6 | "In the Shadows" | 4 May 2018 |
| 40 | 7 | "Chill" | 4 May 2018 |
| 41 | 8 | "Making Waves" | 30 May 2018 |
| 42 | 9 | "Worthy" | 31 May 2018 |
| 43 | 10 | "The Magic Within" | 14 June 2018 |
| 44 | 11 | "Lights Out" | 21 June 2018 |
| 45 | 12 | "Edge of Darkness" | 26 July 2018 |
| 46 | 13 | "The Shadow World – Part 1" | 3 August 2018 |
| 47 | 14 | "The Shadow World – Part 2" | 10 August 2018 |
| 48 | 15 | "The Shadow World – Part 3" | 16 August 2018 |

=== Lego Elves: Secrets of Elvendale (2017) ===
Lego Elves: Secrets of Elvendale, a Netflix series produced by Studio Mir and animated by Production Reve, was released on 1 September 2017. The series is a more detailed retelling of the story featured in Season 3 of the webisodes (webisodes 18 - 33).

Lego Elves: Secrets of Elvendale episodes
| No. overall | No. in season | Title | Directed by | Written by | Original release date | U.S. viewers (millions) |
|---|---|---|---|---|---|---|
| TBA | 1 | "Uninvited Guest" | Kalvin Lee | Nicole Dubuc, Barbara Haynes, Brian Hohlfeld | 1 September 2017 | N/A |
When Emily returns through the portal to Elvendale, she is unaware that her little sister Sophie has followed her. The elves save an earth elf named Cronan from the goblins, who is secretly the Goblin King.
| TBA | 2 | "The Goblin King" | Kalvin Lee | Nicole Dubuc, Barbara Haynes, Brian Hohlfeld | 1 September 2017 | N/A |
Sophie discovers that Cronan is secretly plotting to take Emily's amulet and he captures her. Emily and the elves decide to find her at Cronan's fortress but are trapped by a goblin along the way.
| TBA | 3 | "The Watcher" | Kalvin Lee | Nicole Dubuc, Barbara Haynes, Brian Hohlfeld | 1 September 2017 | N/A |
Emily and the elves are saved from the trap by a hooded elf named Rosalyn and follow her to her home in the Dark Forest. She agrees to help them find Sophie if they heal her dragon, Sapphire.
| TBA | 4 | "Worst Prisoner Ever" | Kalvin Lee | Nicole Dubuc, Barbara Haynes, Brian Hohlfeld | 1 September 2017 | N/A |
Cronan builds a portal, while Rosalyn guides the elves through the Dark Forest. Rosalyn reveals that she is the Queen of the forest whom Cronan tricked and stole her throne. Cronan sends a shadow creature named Darknicity to find Emily and retrieve her amulet, so that he can open the portal and save his mother.
| TBA | 5 | "Shadow Walker" | Kalvin Lee | Nicole Dubuc, Barbara Haynes, Brian Hohlfeld | 1 September 2017 | N/A |
The elves reach the fortress but are forced to flee from the goblins and are hunted by Darknicity. At Rosalyn's home they discover a secret photo of Rosalyn and Cronan.
| TBA | 6 | "Secrets" | Kalvin Lee | Nicole Dubuc, Barbara Haynes, Brian Hohlfeld | 1 September 2017 | N/A |
Cronan plots to capture the elves and sends the goblins to mine crystals from the forest. The elves decide to restore the magic to the forest. Naida goes to Cronan's fortress alone and attempts to befriend him but is captured.
| TBA | 7 | "Betrayals" | Kalvin Lee | Nicole Dubuc, Barbara Haynes, Brian Hohlfeld | 1 September 2017 | N/A |
Skyra reveals the story of Cronan's mother, who desired power and was consumed by her ambition. Cronan tries to trick Naida into retrieving the amulet but she refuses. He tries to imprison her but she escapes. Darknicity attacks the elves and takes Emily but drops the amulet.
| TBA | 8 | "Sacrifice" | Kalvin Lee | Nicole Dubuc, Barbara Haynes, Brian Hohlfeld | 1 September 2017 | N/A |
At the fortress, the elves offer Cronan friendship, but they are attacked by Darknicity. Cronan takes the amulet and opens the portal. He sees an image of his mother, who tells him that he must let her go because the evil will destroy him. Emily uses the amulet to defeat Darknicity and the forest is healed. Cronan gives up his control of the forest and is forgiven by Rosalyn.

==== Critical reception ====
Joyce Slaton for Common Sense Media gave the series a three-star rating and commented on the "beautiful visuals, charming characters, heavy commercialism". The review also opined, "It's certainly lovely to look at -- the typical blocky Lego style has been abandoned for a rainbow-hued and glitter palette - and it goes down smoothly enough for young viewers who like mild antics lightened up with lots of jokes and friendly repartee between characters."

== Other media ==
=== Character spots ===
Several short character spots were released on the Lego YouTube channel to promote the Lego Elves series. Meet Aira, Meet Emily Jones, Meet Farran and Meet Naida were released on 22 January 2015. LEGO Elves - Azari was released on 11 March 2015. Introducing Tidus and Sira, Emily the Elves and the Dragons and The Baby Dragons were released on 9 February 2016. Ragana, Jynx and Dusti and Emily and the Queen Dragon were released on 4 March 2016.

=== Product animations ===
Short (36 seconds to 89 seconds) computer-animated product videos were produced and released on the Lego Elves YouTube channel. The videos showed animation of each of the construction sets and mini-dolls in motion, showcasing the features of each set and what can be done with it.

=== Music videos ===
Several music videos were released on the Lego YouTube channel in 2016 and 2017. They include If You Dare to Believe, Think Twice, and Let’s Do This.

=== Publications ===
==== Magazine ====
A quarterly Lego Elves magazine targeted at girls and published by Immediate Media was launched from 2015 to accompany the toy line.

==== Chapter books ====
Two 128-page chapter books were published by Scholastic Inc. Quest for the Keys was released in August 2015, and The Dragon Queen was released in January 2016.

Activity books

Several activity books were produced during the run of the toy line and the webisodes. A Magical Adventure/A Magical Journey, A Mysterious Book (in Polish), Dragon Adventures, To the Rescue!, The Elf Witches Revenge (in Polish), and The Power of Dark Magic. The books came with items such as a bracelet to be assembled, stickers, or a small LEGO build set with an animal figure from the Lego Elves toy line.

=== Games ===
An app game titled Lego Elves - Unite The Magic was developed by The Lego Group for iOS and released on 1 March 2015.

== Reception ==
In September 2015, The Lego Group reported that the Lego Elves line and Lego Jurassic World, "were received very positively by children all over the world", and that these themes had helped to push revenue up by 23%.

== See also ==
- Lego Friends
- Lego Disney
- Lego DC Superhero Girls
- Lego Unikitty!
- Lego Dreamzzz
- Lego Gabby's Dollhouse
