= Lego Unikitty! =

Lego theme

- Subject: Unikitty!
- Licensed from: The Lego Group, Cartoon Network and Warner Bros. Animation
- Availability: 2018–2019
- Total sets: 9 (including promotional sets)
- Characters: Beatsy, Beau, Brock, Burger Person, Buzz, Cloud Berry, Dino Dude, Dr. Fox, Fee Bee, Hawkodille, Kick Flip, Master Frown, Penny, Puppycorn, Richard "Rick", Square Bear, Sssnake, Stocko, and Unikitty
- TV series: Unikitty!
- Official website

Lego Unikitty! is a discontinued Lego theme based on the animated television series of the same name. It was licensed from The Lego Group and Warner Bros. Animation for Cartoon Network and the series starred the character of the same name from The Lego Movie and its sequel, The Lego Movie 2: The Second Part. The theme was first introduced in August 2018. The product line was discontinued by the end of December 2019.

== Overview ==
Lego Unikitty! was based on the animated television series. The product line focuses on Unikitty and her friends in Unikingdom. As the ruler of Unikingdom, Princess Unikitty has various misadventures in her land with her brother Prince Puppycorn, scientist Dr. Fox, bodyguard Hawkodile, and advisor Richard. They also deal with the threats of Master Frown from the neighboring Frown Town. Lego Unikitty! aimed to recreate the main characters in Lego form, including Unikitty, Puppycorn, Dr. Fox, Hawkodile and Richard.

In April 2016, Christoph Bartneck built a life-sized model of Unikitty from the Unikitty! animated television series. The Unikitty contained a total of 30,000 Lego bricks and was six feet tall.

== Development ==
Lego Unikitty! was inspired by 2017 TV series Unikitty!. The construction toy range was based on the TV series and developed in collaboration with Warner Bros. Consumer Products. The construction sets were designed to recreate the story and characters of the TV series in Lego form. The first appearance of Unikitty on the big screen was in The Lego Movie (2014).

During the development process of the Lego Unikitty! theme, Lego designers Yi-Chien Cheng and Janko Grujic explained the concept of the Lego Unikitty! theme. Yi-Chien Cheng explained, "It's a unisex theme, for both boys and girls. I know Unikitty is pink, so that looks girly, but she's a very active character and there's a very exciting story. So we tried to use lots of colours and lots of crazy ideas, and created lots of cool characters with the new printed elements. So we hope the fans can use these to create something more. We look forward to seeing that!". Janko Grujic explained, "There's a lot of simple bricks, because we wanted to inspire kids to build, we wanted to inspire creativity, and to build in the simplest ways: Just stacking bricks. As Yi-Chien said, we definitely didn't want to exclude anyone, so there are sets that appeal more to the girls and sets that appeal more to the boys. But overall, we were trying to make something that would be for everyone."

The initial concept for the theme originated in a rough sketch created by Ed Skudder, Lynn V Wang and Aaron Horvath in January 2019. The sketch reveals how Unikitty! was developed for television and how the character was refined to transform from 3D to 2D animation on screen.

== Characters ==
- Princess Unikitty: The princess of the Unikingdom who is a cat/unicorn hybrid. She is very happy, playful, cute, and upbeat, but has an angry side that she sometimes struggles to control. She was previously voiced by Alison Brie in the original film. Voiced by Tara Strong.
- Prince Puppycorn: Unikitty's little brother, a pug/unicorn hybrid. He is sometimes clueless and dimwitted, but is also loyal and good-hearted. (Note: Puppycorn makes a non-speaking cameo in The Lego Movie 2: The Second Part during Queen Watevra Wa-Nabi's "Not Evil" song sequence.) Voiced by Grey DeLisle.
- Dr. Fox: A red fox who is the castle's resident scientist whose experiments and inventions can both create and resolve problems. Voiced by Kate Micucci.
- Hawkodile: Unikitty's trusty hawk/crocodile hybrid bodyguard who has a "macho" personality and has a crush on Dr. Fox. He trained to be a fighter in the Action Forest and has a rival named Eagleator (voiced by Keith Ferguson), who was his former best friend and an eagle/alligator hybrid. Voiced by Roger Craig Smith.
- Richard "Rick": A grey 1x3 Lego brick who is Unikitty's royal advisor and the castle's property caretaker. He speaks with a dull monotone voice and is often the voice of reason, though the others find him boring to listen to. Voiced by Roger Craig Smith.
- Master Frown: Unikitty's archenemy who comes from Frown Town at the other side of Unikitty's kingdom. He is one of the Doom Lords that spread pain and misery throughout the world as he wants to impress the other Doom Lords. This often causes him to suffer the wrath of Unikitty, who wants to spread fun and joy. Voiced by Eric Bauza.
- Brock: An anthropomorphic headstone with a neutral personality who is Master Frown's best friend, sidekick, and roommate. Brock would often hang around his apartment playing video games rather than help Master Frown with his plots. The only time he gets angry is when Master Frown neglects his part of the chores. He is also Crankybeard's son. Voiced by H. Michael Croner.
- Beatsby: A boombox with tiny-rounded arms and legs. His toy counterpart has no arms and legs.
- Beau: A rectangular creature with short legs and armless hands. Voiced by Tara Strong
- Burger Person: A cheeseburger citizen of Unikingdom who dislikes being eaten. Voiced by Tara Strong.
- Buzz: A creature with a blue square head and a yellow rectangular body who moves around on a skateboard.
- Cloudbarry: A cloud citizen of the Unikingdom. He is spelled "Cloud Berry" in the toyline.
- Dino Dude: An Australian-accented Tyrannosaurus with wheels instead of legs. Voiced by Grey Griffin in 2017–2018 and Eric Bauza in 2018.
- Feebee: A Southern-accented flower/bumblebee hybrid who runs "Feebee's Flower Shop." Her name is sometimes written as 'FeeBee'. Voiced by Grey Griffin in a Southern accent.
- Kickflip: A pink skateboard-riding square. Voiced by Tara Strong in most episodes and Grey Griffin in "Little Prince Puppycorn".
- Penny: A green creature in full gray-armor who works at the Unikingdom's Toy Zone.
- Sssnake: A snake in a bowler hat made up of rectangles with a triangle-tipped tail. Voiced by H. Michael Croner.
- Stocko: A teal rectangle with arms and a bowler hat. Voiced by Kate Miccuci.
- Squarebear: A brown bear with a rectangular body, slope-shaped ears, and rectangular feet. There is also a pink variant of Squarebear.

== Toy line ==
According to BrickLink, The Lego Group released a total of nine Lego sets and promotional polybags as part of Lego Unikitty! theme. It was discontinued by the end of December 2019.

=== Construction sets ===
In 2018, The Lego Group partnered with Warner Bros. Animation and Cartoon Network. The Lego Group announced that the first wave of sets based on Unikitty! animated television series would be released on 1 August 2018. The seven Lego sets released included Dr. Fox Magnifying Machine, (Note: Dr. Fox Magnifying Machine is an exclusive set.) Unikitty Cloud Car, Prince Puppycorn Trike, Party Time, Dr. Fox Laboratory, Unikingdom Creative Brick Box and Unikingdom Fairground Fun. In addition, two polypag sets released as a promotions were Unikitty Roller Coaster Wagon (Note: This polybag set only available at online shop in May 2020.) and Castle Room. Each of the sets featured seven core characters, named Princess Unikitty, Prince Puppycorn, Dr. Fox, Hawkodile, Richard, Master Frown and Brock. The sets were designed primarily for children aged 5 to 12.

=== Collectible buildable figures ===
Unikitty! blind bags series 1 - Complete was released on 1 August 2018 and included 12 characters based on the Unikitty! animated television series. The twelve collectible buildable figures were Rainbow Unikitty, Angry Unikitty, Shades Puppycorn, Dinosaur Unikitty, Shades Unikitty, Dalmatian Puppycorn, Dessert Unikitty, Camouflage Unikitty, Alien Puppycorn, Sleepy Unikitty, Queasy Unikitty and Dessert Puppycorn.

== Web shorts ==
Fourteen web shorts have been released on YouTube for the Lego Unikitty! theme.

#	Title	Release date	Notes
1	Hide and Go Sparkle with Unikitty	21 May 2018	Lego Unikitty! stop motion series
2	A Ruff Race with Puppycorn	21 May 2018	Lego Unikitty! stop motion series
3	Mad Science Fun with Dr. Fox	21 May 2018	Lego Unikitty! stop motion series
4	Boppin' and Bashin' with Hawkodile	21 May 2018	Lego Unikitty! stop motion series
5	A Day in the Life of Richard	21 May 2018	Lego Unikitty! stop motion series
6	Bumpin' Around with Master Frown	21 May 2018	Lego Unikitty! stop motion series
7	Snack Shack Snack Attack with Brock	21 May 2018	Lego Unikitty! stop motion series
8	Making Stop-Motion Videos	21 May 2018	Lego Unikitty! stop motion series
9	Evil Unikitty, Lab Experiment Gone Wrong	30 July 2018	Lego Unikitty! stop motion series
10	Evil Unikitty, Party Crasher	31 July 2018	Lego Unikitty! stop motion series
11	Evil Unikitty, Unikingdom Park Under Siege	1 August 2018	Lego Unikitty! stop motion series
12	Evil Unikitty, Fairground Frenzy	27 July 2018	Lego Unikitty! stop motion series
13	Unikitty vs. Evil Clone, Final Showdown	3 August 2018	Lego Unikitty! stop motion series
14	Throwing Down	21 October 2018	Lego Unikitty! stop motion series

== Unikitty! TV series ==
In May 2017, Warner Bros. and Lego announced that Unikitty, a character from The Lego Movie, would get a spin-off animated television series on Cartoon Network. For the show, she was voiced by Tara Strong. The premiere date was 1 January 2018 and the show's executive producers were Phil Lord, Christopher Miller, Dan Lin, Roy Lee, Jill Wilfert and Sam Register. Ed Skudder (creator of Dick Figures and co-creator of Dogsnack) and Lynn Wang (co-creator of Dogsnack) were producers, while Aaron Horvath was supervising producer. The series aired a Halloween special/sneak peek entitled "Spoooooky Game" on 27 October 2017. (Note: "Spoooooky Game" aired on this date before the series officially premiered on 1 January 2018 (Although "Sparkle Matter Matters" also aired on 17 November 2017 as a second sneak preview, and "No Day Like Snow Day" also aired on 1 December 2017 as a third sneak preview)) The series aired a second sneak peek titled "Sparkle Matter Matters" on 17 November 2017, and a third and final sneak peek/Christmas special titled "No Day Like Snow Day" aired 1 December 2017. On 27 August 2020, the series concluded with a two-part finale entitled "The Birthday To End All Birthdays".

== Publications ==
In November 2018, a book titled Unikitty: Unikitty's Guide to Being Happy based on the Lego Unikitty! theme was published on 1 November 2018 by Scholastic.

In 2019, Independent Published released several coloring books from the Lego Unikitty! such as Unikitty Coloring Book : Coloring Book for Kids and Adults, Unikitty Coloring Book : GREAT Coloring Book for Any Kid with HIGH QUALITY IMAGES and EXCLUSIVE ILLUSTRATIONS!, Unikitty! Coloring Book for kids ages 3-12 and Unikitty Coloring Book : An Amazing Coloring Book For kids Of Unikitty.

== Reception ==
Unikingdom Fairground Fun (set number:41456) was listed as one of the Bullseye's Top Toys of 2018.

== See also ==
- The Lego Movie (Lego theme)
- The Lego Movie
- The Lego Movie 2: The Second Part
- The Lego Movie: 4D – A New Adventure
- The Lego Batman Movie
- The Lego Batman Movie (Lego theme)
- The Lego Ninjago Movie
- The Lego Ninjago Movie (Lego theme)
- The Lego Movie Videogame
- The Lego Movie 2 Videogame
- Lego Dimensions
- The Lego Ninjago Movie Video Game
- Mixels
- Lego Scooby-Doo
- Lego The Powerpuff Girls
