= Mark Billinghurst =

Augmented reality researcher

Mark Nathan Billinghurst is a professor in computer interface technologies. His work focuses on applications of virtual reality (VR) and augmented reality (AR) technology. Billinghurst has been a Fellow of the IEEE since 2023.

== Education ==
Billinghurst completed his school education at the New Plymouth Boys' High School. He received Bachelor of Computing and Mathematical Science (first class honors) and Master of Philosophy (Applied Mathematics & Physics) degrees in 1990 and 1992 respectively. Both degrees are from Waikato University. He received his PhD in Electrical Engineering from the University of Washington's Human Interface Technology Laboratory in 2002. His dissertation was Shared Space: Explorations in Collaborative Augmented Reality. Billinghurst's doctoral advisors were Linda Shapiro and Thomas A. Furness III. For his PhD course, Billinghurst created the Magic Book, a children's book animated through augmented reality produced by a head-mounted display. Billinghurst describes the Magic Book as technology "that allows you to overlay computer graphics onto the real world, in real time".

== Career ==
Billinghurst is professor of Human Computer Interaction at the University of South Australia (from 2015), professor at the University of Auckland's Bioengineering Institute (from 2018) and director of the Empathic Computing Laboratory. He is the founder and formerly the director of the University of Canterbury's HIT Lab NZ for 13 years; he was also an associate professor at the University of Canterbury. In 2001, Billinghurst co-founded ARToolworks and helped to create ARToolKit, an open source AR development platform. He is a founder of the SuperVentures AR/VR fund. Billinghurst is part of the New Zealand Government’s Growth and Innovation Advisory Board, being appointed in 2005. Billinghurst's previous work includes jobs with ATR Research Labs in Japan, British Telecom's Advanced Perception Unit, an internship with Hit Lab US, Nokia, Google, Amazon and the MIT Media Laboratory. During his career, Billinghurst has published over 650 research papers; he is one of the most cited AR researchers.

== Personal life ==
Billinghurst was born in New Plymouth, New Zealand. He is a member of the Riccarton Ward of The Church of Jesus Christ of Latter-day Saints.

== Awards and honors ==
- 2001 Discover Magazine Entertainment Award for the Magic Book technology.
- Selected for the 2002 New Zealand Innovation Pavilion.
- Nominated for the 2004 World Technology Network Education Award.
- 2006 World Class New Zealand Award.
- Winner of the 2006 International Mobile Gaming Awards Grand Prix for the AR Tennis mobile game.
- 2007 Adweek Buzz Awards for Best Print Campaign.
- 2012 IEEE ISMAR Lasting Impact Award.
- 2013 IEEE VR Technical Achievement Award "for contributions to research and commercialization in Augmented Reality".
- Elevated to Fellow of the Royal Society of New Zealand in 2013.
- 2018 University of South Australia ITEE Research Excellence award.
- 2019 IEEE ISMAR Career Impact Award.
- Elevated to Fellow of the IEEE in 2023 "for contributions to augmented and virtual reality".
