= Artag =

Artag may refer to:

- ARTag, a fiduciary marker system to support augmented reality
- Artoces of Iberia, a king of Georgia from 78 to 63 BC
- Tömöriin Artag, a Mongolian Olympic freestyle wrestler
