= The Lego Batman Movie (Lego theme) =

Lego theme

- Subject: The Lego Batman Movie
- Licensed from: Warner Bros. Pictures, Warner Animation Group, and DC Entertainment
- Availability: 10 February 2017–31 December 2018
- Total sets: 42 (including promotional sets)
- Characters: See #Characters
- Official website

The Lego Batman Movie is a discontinued product line based on The Lego Batman Movie, the second film of The Lego Movie franchise. It is licensed from The Lego Group, Warner Bros. Pictures, Warner Animation Group, and DC Entertainment. The theme was first introduced on 10 February 2017 as part of a licensing and merchandising programme associated with the film. Alongside the release of the Lego sets, the programme included the release of several promotional short films and The Lego Batman Movie Game app. The product line was discontinued by 31 December 2018.

== Overview ==
On 10 February 2017, The Lego Batman Movie was released by Warner Bros. Pictures. The storyline follows the DC character Batman, voiced by Will Arnett, who attempts to overcome his greatest fear to stop the Joker's latest plan. To promote the film, The Lego Group released a collection of Lego construction sets and a set of collectible Lego minifigures, which were based on the characters and locations in the film. A range of other merchandise and media was produced as part of the marketing programme, including a number of books published by DK Publishing, Scholastic, Ameet and Blue Ocean. With more than 21 books, the robust movie tie-in program encompasses storybooks, readers, activity books, sticker books, magazines, junior novel, guide books and The Making of The Lego Batman Movie behind-the-scenes film guide, the first-ever making-of book for the franchise.

In 2016, The Lego Group built a life-sized model of The Batman who appear in The Lego Batman Movie film. The Batman contained a total of 53,998 Lego bricks, and weighed 286 pounds. They were placed in front of San Diego Comic Con. In 2017, The Lego Group built a life-sized model of The Batmobile based on The Lego Batman Movie film. The Batmobile contained a total of 300,000 Lego bricks, and weighed 1,700 pounds. They were placed in front of Detroit Auto Show.

== Development ==
The Lego Batman Movie was inspired by the 2017 film The Lego Batman Movie. The construction toy range was based on the film and developed in collaboration with Warner Bros. Consumer Products. The construction sets were designed to recreate the story and characters of the film in Lego form.

During the development process of The Lego Batman Movie theme, producer Dan Lin explained its concept. Dan Lin explained, "The themes are constantly refined with these LEGO movies, we start with multiple themes, so many different ideas and then we have to slowly strip it away. The question of can Batman be happy, that was where we started in first place – myself, Phil Lord and Chris Miller from the first movie, and Chris McKay. We said, 'okay, now we've had phenomenal success with the first movie, what story do we tell?'" and continued, "At first we thought it was going to be The LEGO Movie Sequel, and then we put that aside. Let's tell a few more stories before we get to that, attack a few more genres. Then when we decided that Batman was going be next we started thinking about what's in the Batman lore that hasn't been explored before. There's obviously been lots of different versions on television and movies and we keyed on can Batman be happy? That's a theme we can actually explore in a LEGO movie way, so we ran forward from there."

Dan Lin also discussed about the different franchises and explained, "We got every franchise that we wanted, except for one – and if you watch the movie closely you'll probably guess which one we didn't get. But it was a lot easier than the first movie, when people didn't know what a LEGO movie was. This was the second time around for some of these franchise rights holders, whether that's J K Rowling or the Saul Zaentz estate, they had worked with us before and had very good experience. We brought in some new franchises, such as the Daleks from Doctor Who, but it was a lot easier because they saw what we were trying to do with the first movie. We're trying to tell the LEGO versions of the characters, so we're not doing the exact Daleks from Doctor Who, we're doing the LEGO version of them. When they see that, and they understand the comedy in that, it makes it a lot easier."

== Characters ==
- Batman: A billionaire, vigilante superhero from Gotham City.
- The Joker: Batman's archenemy who is also known as the "Clown Prince of Crime".
- Robin: An orphan who is adopted by Bruce Wayne, and becomes a sidekick to Batman.
- Barbara Gordon: A police officer who becomes the new police commissioner.
- Alfred Pennyworth: The family butler of the Wayne family, and friend to Bruce Wayne.
- Harley Quinn: The Joker's girlfriend and accomplice, and fellow-criminal in Gotham City.
- Commissioner James Gordon: The commissioner of the Gotham City Police Department, and ally to Batman.
- Chief O'Hara: the Gotham City Police Department's chief of police.
- Mayor McCaskill: The mayor of Gotham City.
- Two-Face: A disfigured lawyer once allied with Batman, who became a villain following his criminal downfall.
- Pamela Isley / Poison Ivy: A villain in Gotham city, who has powers to control flora lifeforms.
- Wicked Witch of the West: an evil witch from the Land of Oz who is imprisoned in the Phantom Zone.
- Edward Nygma / Riddler: A riddle-obsessed criminal from Gotham City.
- Jonathan Crane / Scarecrow: A criminally insane former doctor, who uses fear gas to manipulate the people of Gotham City.
- Selina Kyle / Catwoman: An expert burglar, vigilante anti-hero and criminal from Gotham City.
- Clayface: A villainous criminal from Gotham City, with the metahuman ability of shapeshifting.
- Bane: A criminal genius who uses a drug called "Venom" to gain superhuman strength. Benson satirizes Tom Hardy's performance in The Dark Knight Rises.
- Victor Fries/ Mr. Freeze: A doctor and scientist from Gotham City, who turns to villainy following the death of his wife. Fries wears a cryogenic suit that grants him superhuman abilities and uses a freeze gun.
- Killer Croc: An animalistic, metahuman villain from Gotham City.
- Penguin: A rich and powerful crime lord from Gotham City, who uses trick-umbrellas and robotic penguins.
- Superman: A superhero with various superpowers, from the planet Krypton, and member of the Justice League who defends Earth and lives in Metropolis.

== Toy line ==
=== Construction Sets ===
According to BrickLink, The Lego Group released a total of 42 Lego sets and promotional polybags as part of The Lego Batman Movie theme. It was discontinued by 31 December 2019.

In July 2016, The Lego Group had a partnership with Warner Bros. Animation and DC Comics. The Lego Group had announced that the first wave sets that based on The Lego Batman Movie film would be released on 10 February 2017. The 13 sets being released were The Joker Balloon Escape (set number: 70900), Mr. Freeze Ice Attack (set number: 70901), Catwoman Catcycle Chase (set number: 70902), The Riddler Riddle Racer (set number: 70903), Clayface Splat Attack (set number: 70904), The Batmobile (set number: 70905), The Joker Notorious Lowrider (set number: 70906), Killer Croc Tail-Gator (set number: 70907), The Scuttler (set number: 70908), Batcave Break-In (set number: 70909), Scarecrow Special Delivery (set number: 70910), The Penguin Arctic Roller (set number: 70911) and Arkham Asylum (set number: 70912). In addition, the 7 polybag sets have been released as a promotions are The Mini Batmobile (set number: 30521), Batman in the Phantom Zone (set number: 30522), The Joker Battle Training (set number: 30523), The Mini Batwing (set number: 30524), Disco Batman - Tears of Batman (set number: 30607) and Batgirl (set number: 30612). Also included 6 key chains with a key chain attached to the minifigures of Batman, The Joker, Robin, Catwoman, Harley Quinn and Kiss Kiss Tuxedo Batman. Each of the sets features four core characters, named Batman, Alfred, Robin and Batgirl.

Later, the second wave sets would be released on 2 June 2017. The 5 sets being released were Scarecrow Fearful Face-off (set number: 70913), Bane Toxic Truck Attack (set number: 70914), Two-Face Double Demolition (set number: 70915), The Batwing (set number: 70916) and The Ultimate Batmobile (set number: 70917). In October 2017, The Lego Batman Movie Minifigure Collection (set number: 5004939) is an exclusive promo set only available in Toys "R" Us stores or online shop.

In 2018, the third wave sets would be released on 1 January 2018. The 6 sets being released were The Bat-Dune Buggy (set number: 70918), The Justice League Anniversary Party (set number: 70919), Egghead Mech Food Fight (set number: 70920), Harley Quinn Cannonball Attack (set number: 70921), The Joker Manor (set number: 70922) and The Bat-Space Shuttle (set number: 70923). In additional, The Mini Ultimate Batmobile (set number: 30526) and Bat Shooter (set number: 40301) polybag sets have been released as promotions.

=== Collectible minifigures ===
The Lego Batman Movie Series 1 (set number: 71017) would be released on 1 January 2017 as a part of the Lego Minifigures theme. It consists of 20 characters instead of the usual 16.

The Lego Batman Movie Series 2 (set number: 71020) would be released around the world on 1 January 2018 as a part of the Lego Minifigures theme. It consists of 20 characters instead of the usual 16.

=== Lego BrickHeadz sets ===
Several The Lego Batman Movie characters have also been released as part of the Lego BrickHeadz theme. A range of The Lego Batman Movie BrickHeadz was announced on 1 March 2017, which included Batman, Batgirl, Robin and The Joker as buildable characters.

== Reception ==
In July 2018, The Scuttler (set number: 70908), Batcave Break-In (set number: 70909), The Ultimate Batmobile (set number: 70917) and The Bat-Space Shuttle (set number: 70923) was listed as "The 10 Best 'Batman' Lego Sets for Kids and Collectors" by official website Fatherly. In November 2018, the Toy Retailers Association listed The Lego Batman Movie Minifigure Series (set number: 71017) on its official list of 2018 Toy of the Year Awards.

== See also ==
- The Lego Movie (franchise)
- The Lego Movie
- The Lego Movie (Lego theme)
- The Lego Batman Movie
- The Lego Ninjago Movie
- The Lego Ninjago Movie (Lego theme)
- The Lego Movie 2: The Second Part
- Unikitty!
- Lego Unikitty!
- Lego Minifigures (theme)
- Lego Batman
- Lego Super Heroes
- Lego Dimensions
