= Geospatial Research Centre =

The Geospatial Research Centre (NZ) Ltd. is a consultancy company based in Christchurch, New Zealand in the University of Canterbury's Engineering department. It was set up in 2006 by the University of Canterbury, the University of Nottingham, and the Canterbury Development Corporation. The director is Dr David Park. Their research focuses on civilian uses of Unmanned Aerial Vehicles, and on remote sensing and sensor integration.

== See also ==
- UCi3
