= Christoph Bartneck =

New Zealand professor and author

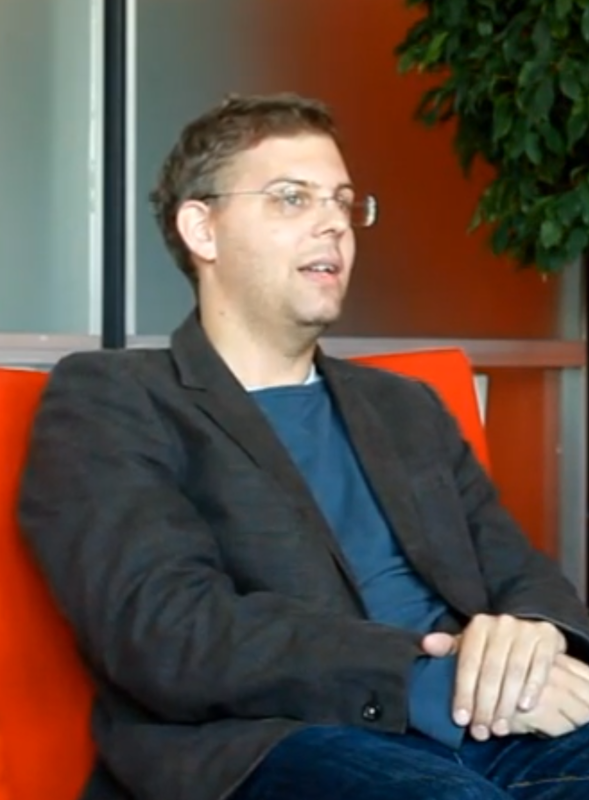
- Bartneck in 2010
- Born: 1973 (age 52–53)
- Education: Eindhoven University of Technology (MHTI, PhD)
- Occupation: Professor
- Years active: 1990s–present
- Website: bartneck.de

Christoph Bartneck (born 1973) is a professor, researcher, and author specialising in human–computer interaction and industrial design. Bartneck is currently a professor of the computer science and software engineering department at the University of Canterbury in New Zealand, and was formerly involved with HIT Lab NZ. As a writer, Bartneck has published books and articles on robotic anthropomorphism, computing ethics, and design, and is an associate editor of the International Journal of Social Robotics. In addition, Bartneck formerly worked for Lego and has written extensive catalogues on minifigs and Lego bricks.

Bartneck has been involved in over 250 papers since completing his thesis in the late 90s, and is a member of several academic organisations, including the New Zealand Association of Scientists.

== Early and personal life ==
Bartneck has had a passion for Lego since he was a child. He received a Diploma in Industrial Design and Computer Science from Hannover University of Applied Sciences, and completed both a Master of Technological Design in User-System Interaction and his PhD at the Eindhoven University of Technology.

In December 2010, Bartneck left the Netherlands and moved to Christchurch, New Zealand.

In addition to English, Bartneck claims to be able to speak Dutch (also Flemish) and German. He runs a YouTube channel which is both a vlog and academic resource.

== Career ==
=== Early career ===
Bartneck worked for Lego in Denmark after graduating. He also worked for various technology companies including Eagle River Interactive and Philips Research.

=== Academic ===
Bartneck has been involved in over 250 research papers and since completing his thesis in 1997. He was an assistant professor at the department of industrial design at Eindhoven University of Technology. In 2010 he joined the Faculty of Engineering at the University of Canterbury, and has worked in both HIT Lab NZ (based on campus) and the computer science and software engineering department. Bartneck mainly works in the areas of human–computer interaction, robotics (particularly ethics), and industrial and visual design, and the intersection of these disciplines in computer science and software engineering.

Since the 2010s, Bartneck has written articles on the ethics of robotics and artificial intelligence. In 2016, Bartneck made international headlines after generating an academic paper written with the iOS autocomplete feature, submitted under the alias "Iris Pear"; the paper was accepted and he was invited to speak at the conference, despite the contents of the submission being nonsensical. The stunt was to bring attention to unreliable and illegitimate conferences posing as credible academic sources.

Bartneck is a member of several academic groups including the AI Researchers Association New Zealand, the New Zealand Association of Scientists, and Academic Freedom Aotearoa.

=== Lego-related projects ===
In addition to working at Lego in the 1990s, Bartneck has published several books on Lego bricks and minifigs. In 2010, he began cataloguing the history of minifigs, a project he completed in 2015 and published as The Complete LEGO Minifigure Catalog 1975–2015. Bartneck also founded the Christchurch LEGO group which has held collection exhibitions. In 2015, Bartneck published a work of fiction, The Ideal Order, based on a LEGO collection story.

Some of Bartneck's studies have been based on Lego, including a 2013 project which found that minifig face design has become "angrier" since the 1990s, based on an evaluation of 6000 designs and their perceived emotion. In 2018, Bartneck co-authored a paper arguing Lego sets had become "more complex."

Bartneck was a member of the LEGO Mindstorms Developer Network from 2013 to 2014.

== Selected written works ==
- The Unofficial LEGO Color Guide (2017) ISBN 0473423855, 978-0473423858
- The Middle Earth LEGO Minifigure Catalog: From The Hobbit To Lord of The Rings (2016) ISBN 1535193425, 978-1535193429
- The Classic Castle LEGO Minifigure Catalog (2016) ISBN 1537189301, 978-1537189307
- The Complete LEGO Minifigure Catalog 1975-2015 (2016) ISBN 0473372967, 978-0473372965
- The Ideal Order (2015) ISBN 978-1387899807
- The Star Wars LEGO Minifigure Catalog (2012) ISBN 1470108100, 978-1470108106
- Learning Roila (2011) ASIN B006HW51F4

=== Academic works and collaborations ===
- An Introduction to Ethics in Robotics and AI (SpringerBriefs in Ethics) (2021) ISBN 978-3030511104
- Robots in Education: An Introduction to High-Tech Social Agents, Intelligent Tutors, and Curricular Tools (2021) ISBN 978-1000388848
- Human-Robot Interaction: An Introduction (2020) ISBN 978-1108587303
- Ethik in KI und Robotik (2019) ISBN 3446462279, 978-3446462274
- Measurement instruments for the anthropomorphism, animacy, likeability, perceived intelligence, and perceived safety of robots (2009) doi:10.1007/s12369-008-0001-3
- A design-centred framework for social human-robot interaction (2004) doi:10.1109/ROMAN.2004.1374827
