= HIT Lab NZ =

Research Centre

Human Interface Technology Lab NZ (HIT Lab NZ)
- HIT Lab NZ logo since 2016
- Parent institution: University of Canterbury
- Established: 2002; 24 years ago
- Focus: Human Interface Technology, Augmented Reality, Virtual Reality, Applied Immersive Games
- Director: Professor Rob Lindeman
- Slogan: We put PEOPLE before technology
- Address: Level 2, John Britten Building, 69 Creyke Road, Ilam, Christchurch 8041
- Location: Christchurch, New Zealand
- Coordinates: 43.5206°S 172.5831°E
- Interactive map of Human Interface Technology Lab NZ (HIT Lab NZ)
- Website: https://www.hitlabnz.org/

The Human Interface Technology Lab NZ (HIT Lab NZ) (Māori: Hangarau Tangata, Tangata Hangarau) is a research centre in the Faculty of Engineering at the University of Canterbury, in the South Island of New Zealand. Primarily the research undertaken fits within the ANZSRC Type of Activity applied research category. HIT Lab NZ also teaches two postgraduate research degrees, a PhD degree and a research Masters, both in the field of Human Interface Technology.

== Research ==
HIT Lab NZ undertakes applied research with a focus on human interface technology and in particular, virtual reality, augmented reality and applied immersive games.

Its research mission is to "support and empower people through the study, invention, development and dissemination of knowledge, technologies and processes that solve human interface technology problems and have a positive social impact in a globally-aware context."

Applied Immersive Games became a research focus for HIT Lab NZ in 2019 when the University established the Applied Immersive Gaming Initiative (AIGI) with a matching grant of $7.7 million from the TEC Entrepreneurial Universities Fund.

== History ==
HIT Lab NZ was established in 2002 as a joint venture between the University of Canterbury, the University of Washington, and the Canterbury Development Corporation (CDC). Professor Tom Furness, was a key member of the establishment team having set up the original HIT Lab at Seattle's University of Washington, and Mark Billinghurst was appointed as Director.

The research centre was officially opened by Jim Anderton on 17 February 2003 in the Old Maths Building, University of Canterbury and relocated to the NZi3 building (later renamed as the John Britten Building) after the Christchurch earthquakes.

From its establishment, HIT Lab NZ has provided research supervision and teaching to graduate students enrolled in departments across the University of Canterbury who conducted their research in the lab. From 2011 students have been able to enrol in a PhD in human interface technology at HIT Lab NZ, and from 2012, a Master of Human Interface Technology (MHIT).

== Directors ==
- 2002–2015 Professor Mark Billinghurst
- 2015–2018 Ken Beckman
- 2018–present Professor Rob Lindeman
