= ARToolKit =

Tracking library for AR applications

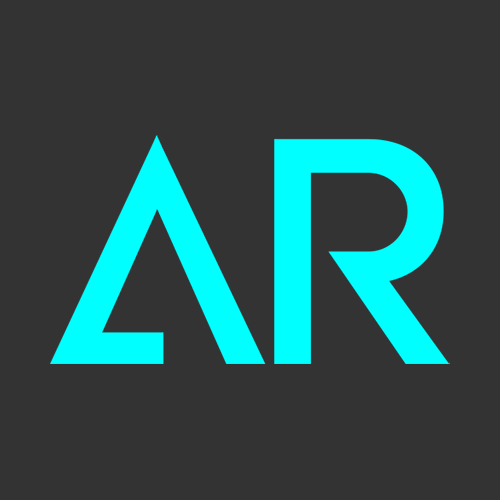
- Original authors: Hirokazu Kato, Mark Billinghurst, Ivan Poupyrev
- Release: 1999; 27 years ago
- Stable release: 1.1.22 / December 13, 2024; 21 months ago
- Written in: C, C++
- Operating system: Cross-platform: Linux, Windows, OS X, iOS, Android
- Type: 3D graphics
- License: GNU Lesser General Public License v3.0 with special exemptions.
- Website: http://www.artoolkitx.org/, http://www.hitl.washington.edu/artoolkit/
- Repository: github.com/artoolkitx/artoolkitx

ARToolKit is an open-source computer tracking library for creation of augmented reality applications that overlay virtual imagery on the real world. Currently, it is maintained as an open-source project hosted on GitHub.

== Overview ==
In order to create augmented reality, ARToolKit uses video tracking capabilities that calculate the real camera position and orientation relative to square physical markers or natural feature markers in real time. Once the real camera position is known a virtual camera can be positioned at the same point and 3D computer graphics models drawn exactly overlaid on the real marker. So ARToolKit solves two of the key problems in Augmented Reality; viewpoint tracking and virtual object interaction.

ARToolKit was originally developed by Hirokazu Kato of Nara Institute of Science and Technology in 1999 and was released by the University of Washington HIT Lab. In 2001 ARToolWorks was incorporated, and v1.0 of the open-source version of ARToolKit was released through the HIT Lab. ARToolKit was one of the first AR SDKs for mobile, seen running first on Symbian in 2005, then iOS with the iPhone 3G in 2008, and finally Android as early as 2010 with a professional version by ARToolWorks later in 2011.

ARToolKit was acquired by DAQRI and re-released open-source starting at version 5.2 on May 13, 2015, including all of the features that were previously only available in the professional licensed version. Among these features are mobile support and natural feature tracking.

ARToolKitPlus (sometimes written "ARToolKit+") was intended to be a successor to the ARToolKit library that was optimized for mobile devices. ARToolKit was originally written in C; ARToolKit+ was ported it to C++ to make it easier to maintain, and has a new class-based (C++) API that is intended to be easier-to-use.

Ben Vaughan and Phil Lamb, the former CEO and CTO of ARToolworks, created artoolkitX to ensure that the software is developed and maintained and the ARToolKit community continues to be supported. artoolkitX was initially supported by Realmax Inc, a Chinese AR company that develops AR hardware and software.

== Features ==
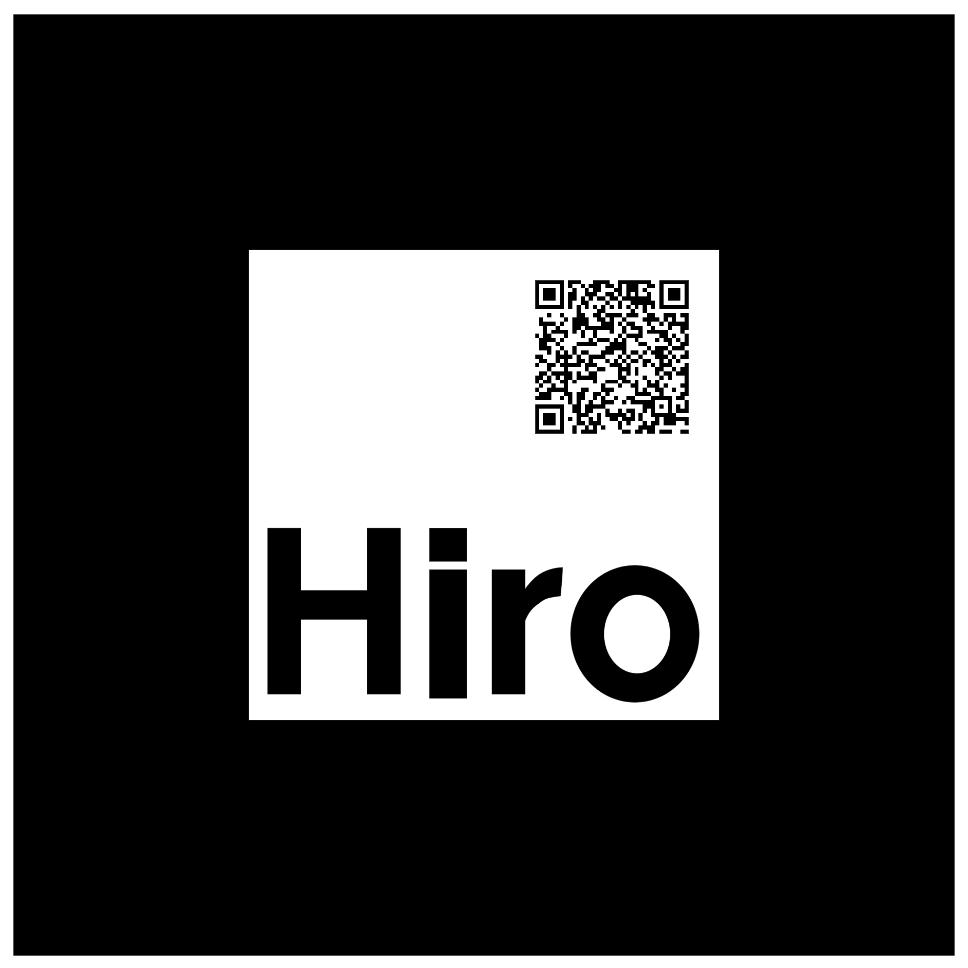
An example of an AR code containing a QR code.

- Single-camera or stereo-camera (camera position/orientation tracking).
- Tracking of simple black squares (any square marker patterns).
- Tracking of planar images (natural feature markers).
- Camera calibration, optical stereo calibration, square marker generation, and natural feature marker generation utilities.
- Plugins for Unity and OpenSceneGraph.
- Optical head-mounted display support.
- Free and open source software.
- Fast enough for real time AR applications.

== Operating systems ==
The current version of ARToolKit supports Microsoft Windows, Mac OS X, Linux, iOS, and Android platforms. Other versions of ARToolKit have also been ported to Symbian, and Windows Phone to support mobile AR applications.

ARToolKit is also available as a plugin for the Unity game engine for example to align a virtual camera within Unity with a real-world camera relative to a tracked marker target and taking care of communicating with the camera. The plugin supports Unity on OS X, Unity on Windows, Unity on Android, and Unity on iOS.

== See also ==
Comparison of augmented reality fiducial markers for computer vision

- ARTag
