= Daqri =

DAQRI
- Company type: Private
- Dissolved: 2019
- Headquarters: Los Angeles, California
- Founders: Philip Tolk Brian Mullins (entrepreneur); Gaia Dempsey
- CEO: Roy Ashok
- Key people: Roy Ashok; Chris Kaufield; Daniel Wagner; Nalin Senthamil; Paul Sweeney
- Employees: 140
- Website: daqri.com
- Launched: 2010

DAQRI was an American augmented reality company headquartered in Los Angeles, CA.

As of September 13, 2019, the company has been reported to have gone out of business.

The company's primary product was an augmented reality wearable technology product, DAQRI Smart Glasses, designed for the industrial industry. DAQRI's earlier Smart Helmet product was the subject of many industry application studies.

== History ==
=== 2010 ===
DAQRI was founded.

=== 2011 ===
DAQRI entered the market in February 2011 by releasing an augmented reality publishing platform designed to superimpose an image or video over a smartphone's camera after scanning a QR code.

=== 2012 ===
Daqri created content and applications for 4D augmented reality technology for entertainment, education and industrial companies.

=== 2013 ===
In June 2013, Daqri raised a $15 million Series A led by Tarsadia Investments. Atom Factory CEO Troy Carter, Ashton Kutcher, and D.A. Wallach joined the company's advisory board. As of July 2017, total Daqri financing was reported at $275 million, led by Tarsadia Investments.

=== 2014 ===
In 2014, Daqri expanded its business model into wearable tech hardware and began development on an augmented reality Smart Helmet, an Android-powered hard hat designed for the industrial and construction industries. Daqri Smart Helmet contains a Sixth Gen Intel Core m7 processor chip and an array of cameras and sensors, and is used to create augmented reality for the industrial worker, including visual instructions, real time alerts, and 3D mapping.

=== 2015 ===
In February 2015, Daqri acquired Melon, an EEG-tracking headband company headquartered in Venice, Los Angeles, for an undisclosed sum. In May 2015, Daqri acquired ARToolworks, one of the earliest augmented reality companies on the market, notable for the open-source ARToolKit libraries. In June that year, Daqri opened a European headquarters and development center in Dublin, Ireland.

=== 2016 ===
The Smart Helmet was eventually unveiled at CES 2016 as part of Intel's keynote. In March 2016, Daqri acquired 1066 Labs, a leading head-mounted display manufacturer focused on serving enterprise clients with augmented reality solutions, as well as U.K.-based Two Trees Photonics, a holographic technology company. In June, Daqri was listed on CNBC's Disruptor 50 companies for 2016. Later that year, another European office was established in Vienna, Austria.

=== 2017 ===
In January 2017, Daqri released a new form factor of augmented reality Smart Glasses. As of July 2017, total Daqri financing was reported at $275 million, led by Tarsadia Investments. After reported layoffs of nearly a quarter of the staff, on October 10, 2017, DAQRI co-founder and chief executive officer Brian Mullins stepped down and was replaced with chief product officer Roy Ashok. Two months later, co-founder Gaia Dempsey publicly announced she was leaving the company as well. As 2017 came to a close, Roy Ashok was quoted that Daqri Smart Helmet would no longer be a focus for Daqri and that the newly launched glasses would be the company's hardware offering moving forward: "The Glasses are much more appealing — in form factor and price point —but definitely for use in a more horizontal fashion, the glasses are a good fit. Nothing has surprised thus far. Everything has been consistent with our understanding of the space. Bear in mind, we’ve been working with many customers through the helmet programs, so they’ve already finished their innovation projects and now they’re looking at how to roll this out within their organization. You have to be careful about how you roll these out. The last thing you want is some bad experience for a customer, especially at this point."

=== 2018 ===
On March 7, 2018, Daqri announced Worksense, a new suite of augmented reality productivity applications as part of its push to increase adoption of its AR smart glasses.

=== 2019 ===
On September 9, 2019, Daqri announced via email that it was pursuing an asset sale and was shutting down its cloud and smart-glasses hardware platforms by the end of September. According to former employees and sources close to Daqri, the company shuttered its HQ, laid off many of its employees and was selling off assets ahead of a shutdown.
