= The Lego Movie (Lego theme) =

Lego product line based on The Lego Movie

- Subject: The Lego Movie
- Licensed from: Warner Bros. Pictures and Warner Animation Group
- Availability: 26 December 2013–31 December 2019
- Total sets: 30 The Lego Movie sets and 38 The Lego Movie 2 sets
- Characters: List of characters
- Official website

The Lego Movie is a Lego product line based on the 2014 film of the same name. It was licensed from The Lego Group, Warner Bros. Pictures, and Warner Animation Group. The theme was first introduced on 26 December 2013 in the United Kingdom and 30 December in the United States to coincide with the release of the film, along with The Lego Movie Videogame. Further sets were produced to coincide with the release of the second film in The Lego Movie franchise, titled The Lego Movie 2: The Second Part. The product line was discontinued by 31 December 2019.

== Overview ==
On 7 February 2014, The Lego Movie was released by Warner Bros. Pictures. The storyline follows the adventures of Emmett Brickowski, an ordinary construction worker, voiced by Chris Pratt, who along with several other Lego characters, must save the world from an evil overlord. To promote the film, The Lego Group released a collection of Lego construction sets and a set of collectible Lego minifigures, which were based on the characters and locations in the film. A range of other merchandise and media was produced as part of the marketing programme, including The Lego Movie Video Game and a number of books published by Penguin and Scholastic.

In 2019, a sequel was released, titled The Lego Movie 2: The Second Part. It was released in North America and the United Kingdom on 8 February 2019. To promote the sequel, The Lego Group designed a collection of Lego sets based on the additional characters and locations introduced in the film. An accompanying video game was developed, titled The Lego Movie 2 Videogame, which was released on 26 March 2019.

== Development ==
Following the success of The Lego Movie, The Lego Batman Movie and The Lego Ninjago Movie, The Lego Group aimed to make a fourth success with The Lego Movie 2: The Second Part. The development of the theme was the result of a collaboration between the film makers and Lego designers. The Lego Movie 2: The Second Part was developed to reach a wider audience than The Lego Movie film, which meant that it diverged from the film storyline. The development of both the film and its associated product line was predominantly influenced by the writers and directors of the film, however the Lego design team ensured that the characters remained true to the film. Matthew Ashton, The Lego Group's Vice President of Design commented, "I also coordinate toy development from our side. When we're reviewing the scripts and the storyboards and animatics ... we're like, 'Actually this would make a really good toy,' and then we co-develop that with the animation and art teams at the studio to make sure we create something that does everything that it needs to do, be as action packed as it needs to be in the movie and then also makes a really good playable, buildable toy at the same time."

== Characters ==
- Emmet Brickowski - an everyman, construction worker and inexperienced Master Builder from Bricksburg.
- President Business - the former President of the Octan corporation.
- Lucy / Wyldstyle - a Master Builder and Emmet's girlfriend.
- Batman - a DC superhero who is a Master Builder.
- MetalBeard - a Master Builder who is a large bionic pirate with a severed head after he lost his original body in an earlier encounter with Lord Business' forces.
- Princess Uni-Kitty - a Master Builder who is a unicorn-horned cat that lives in Cloud Cuckoo Land.
- Benny - a Master Builder who is a spaceship-obsessed 1980's spaceman.
- Bad Cop / Good Cop - a police officer with a two-sided head and a split personality who serves Lord Business as the commander of the Super Secret Police.
- Vitruvius - a blind old wizard who is one of the Master Builders.
- Rex Dangervest - a self-declared "galaxy-defender, archaeologist, cowboy and raptor trainer."
- Queen Watevra Wa'Nabi - the shape-shifting alien queen of the Systar System.
- General Sweet Mayhem - an intergalactic mini-doll who serves as commander for Queen Watevra Wa'Nabi.
- Ice Cream Cone - a talking ice cream cone and citizen of the Systar System who serves as Queen Watevra Wa'Nabi's aide.
- Susan - a mini-doll and one of Queen Watevra Wa-Nabi's servants.
- Balthazar - a sparkly-faced teenage vampire, spa expert, and DJ from the planet Sparkle in the Systar System.
- Banarnar - a sentient banana peel who is a citizen of the Systar System.

== Toy line ==
=== Construction sets ===
According to BrickLink, The Lego Group released a total of 30 Lego sets and promotional polybags based on The Lego Movie and 38 sets and promotional polybags based on The Lego Movie 2. It was discontinued by 31 December 2019.

==== The Lego Movie sets ====
In November 2013, The Lego Group had a partnership with Warner Bros. Animation. The Lego Group announced that the first wave of sets based on The Lego Movie would be released on 7 February 2014, along with The Lego Movie Video Game. The 14 sets were Getaway Glider, Melting Room, Bad Cop's Pursuit, Cloud Cuckoo Palace, Ice Cream Machine, Trash Chomper, Castle Cavalry, MetalBeard's Duel, Super Cycle Chase, Lord Business' Evil Lair, MetalBeard's Sea Cow, The Flying Flusher, Creative Ambush and Rescue Reinforcements. In addition, three polybag sets were released as promotions which were The Piece of Resistance, Micro Manager Battle and Super Secret Police Enforcer. These included three key chains with a key chain attached to the minifigures of Emmet, Wyldstyle and Bad Cop. Each of the sets featured seven core characters, named Emmet, Lucy, Batman, MetalBeard, Unikitty, Benny and Vitruvius.

Later, it was announced that the second wave of sets would be released in June 2014. The three sets being released were Emmet's Construct-o-Mech, Super Secret Police Dropship and Benny's Spaceship, Spaceship, SPACESHIP!. In addition, three polybag sets were released as promotions which were Pyjamas Emmet, Radio DJ Robot and Western Emmet.

In September 2014, The Lego Group announced that a third wave sets would be released in January 2015. The three sets being released were Batman & Super Angry Kitty Attack, Double-Decker Couch and Bad Cop Car Chase.

==== The Lego Movie 2: The Second Part sets ====
In November 2018, The Lego Group announced that the first wave of sets based on the second film, The Lego Movie 2: The Second Part would be released in the following month. The 17 sets being released were Lego Movie Maker, Emmet and Benny's 'Build and Fix' Workshop!, Unikitty's Sweetest Friends EVER!, Emmet's Thricycle!, Introducing Queen Watevra Wa'Nabi, Queen Watevra's Build Whatever Box!, Rex's Rex-treme Offroader!, Ultrakatty & Warrior Lucy!, Pop-Up Party Bus, Emmet and Lucy's Escape Buggy!, Sweet Mayhem's Systar Starship!, Emmet's Dream House/Rescue Rocket!, Emmet's Builder Box! Lucy's Builder Box!, MetalBeard's Heavy Metal Motor Trike!, Rex's Rexplorer! and Battle-Ready Batman and MetalBeard. In addition, six polybag sets were released as promotions, which were Emmet's 'Piece' Offering, Rex's Plantimal Ambush, Lucy vs. Alien Invader, Mini Master-Building MetalBeard, Mini Master-Building Emmet and Star-Stuck Emmet. Each of the sets featured the new characters named Rex, Queen Watevra Wa'Nabi and General Sweet Mayhem.

On 27 November 2018, it was announced that The Lego Movie 2 Videogame would be released on 26 February 2019 and included Star-Stuck Emmet minifigure as a free gift.

In February 2019, it was announced that the second wave of sets would be released in May 2019. The six sets being released were Shimmer & Shine Sparkle Spa!, Queen Watevra's 'So-Not-Evil' Space Palace, The Rexcelsior!, Welcome to Apocalypseburg! Benny's Space Squad and Emmet's Triple-Decker Couch Mech. These included three key chains with a key chain attached to the minifigures of Emmet, Lucy and Crayon Girl.

Later, the third wave of sets were released in August 2019. The three sets were Good Morning Sparkle Babies!, Systar Party Crew and Wyld-Mayhem Star Fighter.

=== Collectible minifigures ===
The Lego Movie Series was released in February 2014 as a sub-brand of the Lego Minifigures theme and included 16 characters from The Lego Movie.

The Lego Movie 2: The Second Part Series was released on 1 February 2019 as a sub-brand of the Lego Minifigures theme and included 20 characters from The Lego Movie 2: The Second Part.

=== Duplo sets ===
Emmet and Lucy's Visitors from the Duplos Planet set have also been produced as part of the Duplo theme and was released in December 2018. The set consists of 53 pieces with 2 Duplo figures. The included 4 buildable alien invaders from The Lego Movie 2: The Second Part film. It also included Duplo figures of Emmet and Lucy. These set are twice the length, height, and width of traditional Lego bricks, making them easier to handle and less likely to be swallowed by younger children. Despite their size, they are still compatible with traditional Lego bricks.

=== Lego BrickHeadz sets ===
Several The Lego Movie 2: The Second Part characters have also been released as part of the Lego BrickHeadz theme. A range of The Lego Movie 2: The Second Part BrickHeadz was announced in 2019, which included Emmet, Wyldstyle, Benny and Sweet Mayhem as buildable characters.

== Short films ==
Several short films set within the franchise were produced, most of which were released on the home media releases of the films. In addition, various other shorts made to promote the films were released on YouTube.

=== Batman's A True Artist (2014) ===
Batman's A True Artist is a stop-motion animated short film included on the home media release of The Lego Movie. It is presented as a music video to Batman's song from that film. It was created by 6 year-old Markus Jolly.

=== Michelangelo and Lincoln: History Cops (2014) ===
Michelangelo and Lincoln: History Cops is a stop-motion animated short film included on the home media release of The Lego Movie. It is presented as a trailer to a fictional action blockbuster starring the master builders, Michaelangelo and Abraham Lincoln as they fight crime.

=== Enter the Ninjago (2014) ===
Enter the Ninjago is a short film included on the home media release of The Lego Movie. The president of Hollywood sits down with Emmet and changes up the plot of The Lego Movie to prominently feature ninjas for marketing purposes. They eventually decide to create a new ninja based film, titled "The super-crunchy ninja skateboard party movie with pratfalls slash physical comedy and cute furry animals for the international audience" which the short jokingly states became the biggest box-office bomb in the history of cinema. The whole film is reference to Lego Ninjago.

=== Emmet's Holiday Party (2018) ===
On December 10, 2018, Warner Bros. released a Christmas-styled promotion for The Lego Movie 2: The Second Part, titled Emmet's Holiday Party. In the short, Emmet and the citizens of Apocalypseburg throw a big Christmas Party to make everything awesome again despite the concern of attack from the Systar System. Although originally released as an online short, it was eventually included as a bonus feature on The Lego Movie 2: The Second Part's home media release.

== Video games ==
=== The Lego Movie Videogame (2014) ===
The Lego Movie Videogame is a Lego-themed action-adventure video game based on The Lego Movie. The game was developed by TT Fusion and published by Warner Bros. Interactive Entertainment. It was released alongside of the film in 2014 for Microsoft Windows, Nintendo 3DS, PlayStation 3, PlayStation 4, PlayStation Vita, Wii U, Xbox 360 and Xbox One. On 16 October 2014, it was released for Mac OS X and developed by Feral Interactive.

Todd Hansen is the only actor to reprise his role from the film as Gandalf, but Chris Pratt, Will Ferrell, Elizabeth Banks, Will Arnett, Nick Offerman, Alison Brie, Charlie Day, Liam Neeson and Morgan Freeman were credited for their archive film voices. It features over 100 playable characters.

=== The Lego Movie 2 Videogame (2019) ===
The Lego Movie 2 Videogame is a Lego-themed action-adventure video game based on The Lego Movie 2: The Second Part, and was announced on 27 November 2018. The game was developed by Traveller's Tales and published by Warner Bros. Interactive Entertainment. On 26 February 2019, the game was released for the PlayStation 4, Xbox One, Nintendo Switch and Microsoft Windows. On 14 March 2019, it was released for macOS.

=== Lego Dimensions (2015) ===
The crossover toys-to-life game Lego Dimensions, developed by Traveller's Tales, features content based on the original The Lego Movie and The Lego Batman Movie. A "Starter Pack" includes an additional level that recreates the events of the original film and adds Wyldstyle as a playable character. Additional "Fun packs" add Emmet, Benny, Bad Cop and Unikitty as playable characters. A "story pack" offers an extended six-level story campaign retelling the events of The Lego Batman Movie, and includes a playable Robin and Batgirl. In addition, "Fun packs" added Excalibur Batman as a playable character.

== Theme park attractions ==
A short 4D film attraction titled The Lego Movie: 4D – A New Adventure was released on 29 January 2016 at Legoland Florida Resort. The attraction was later rolled out to Legoland California, Legoland Windsor, Legoland Billund, Legoland Deutschland and Legoland Malaysia. It was also rolled out in Legoland Discovery Centres.

On 27 May 2021, Legoland California Resort opened The Lego Movie World, which features six attractions based on the films The Lego Movie and The Lego Movie 2: The Second Part. The attractions include Emmet's Flying Adventure, Unikitty's Disco Drop, Benny's Playship, The Awesome Shop, Build Watevra You Wa'na Build, and Queen Watevra's Carousel.

== Publications ==
In 2019, In 2016, The Lego Movie 2: The Second Part magazine published by Media Lab Books was launched from January 2019 in US to accompany the toy line.

Several books were also released about The Lego Movie 2: The Second Part and published by DK. A book titled The Lego Movie 2: Keeping It Awesomer With Emmet, which included an exclusive Emmet minifigure. A book titled The Lego Movie 2 The Awesomest, Most Amazing, Most Epic Movie Guide In The Universe! features the images from the movie and photography of the newly released The Lego Movie 2 sets and minifigures. The Lego Movie 2 Ultimate Sticker Collection features 1,000 colourful and reusable stickers. The Lego Movie 2 Emmet To The Rescue (DK Reader Level 1) and The Lego Movie 2 Awesome Heroes (DK Reader Level 2) aimed at children aged 4+ (level 1) and children 6+ (level 2).

== Reception ==
In November 2014, the Toy Retailers Association listed the Benny's Spaceship, Spaceship, SPACESHIP! (set number: 70816) on its official list of Dream Toys 2014. In 2015, the Toy Industry Association listed The Lego Movie theme on its official list of 2015 Toy of the Year Awards.

In June 2018, MetalBeard's Sea Cow (set number: 70810), Benny's Spaceship, Spaceship, SPACESHIP! (set number: 70816), Cloud Cuckoo Palace (set number: 70803), Double-Decker Couch (set number: 70818), The Lego Movie Series (set number: 71004), Western Emmet, Super Secret Police Dropship (set number: 70815), Castle Cavalry (set number: 70806), Ice Cream Machine (set number: 70804) and Melting Room (set number: 70801) was listed as the "Top 10 Best Lego Movie Sets " by Lego fansite BricksFanz.

In October 2018, Getaway Glider (set number: 70800) was listed as one of the "Top 10 Western Lego Sets" by Lego fansite BricksFanz.

== Awards and nominations ==
In 2014, Benny's Spaceship, Spaceship, SPACESHIP! (set number: 70816) was awarded "DreamToys" in the Build The World category by the Toy Retailers Association.

== See also ==
- Lego Space
- Lego Adventurers
- The Lego Batman Movie
- The Lego Batman Movie (Lego theme)
- The Lego Ninjago Movie
- The Lego Ninjago Movie (Lego theme)
- Unikitty!
- Lego Unikitty!
- Lego Minifigures (theme)
- The Lego Movie Videogame
- The Lego Movie 2 Videogame
- Lego Dimensions
