= NZi3 =

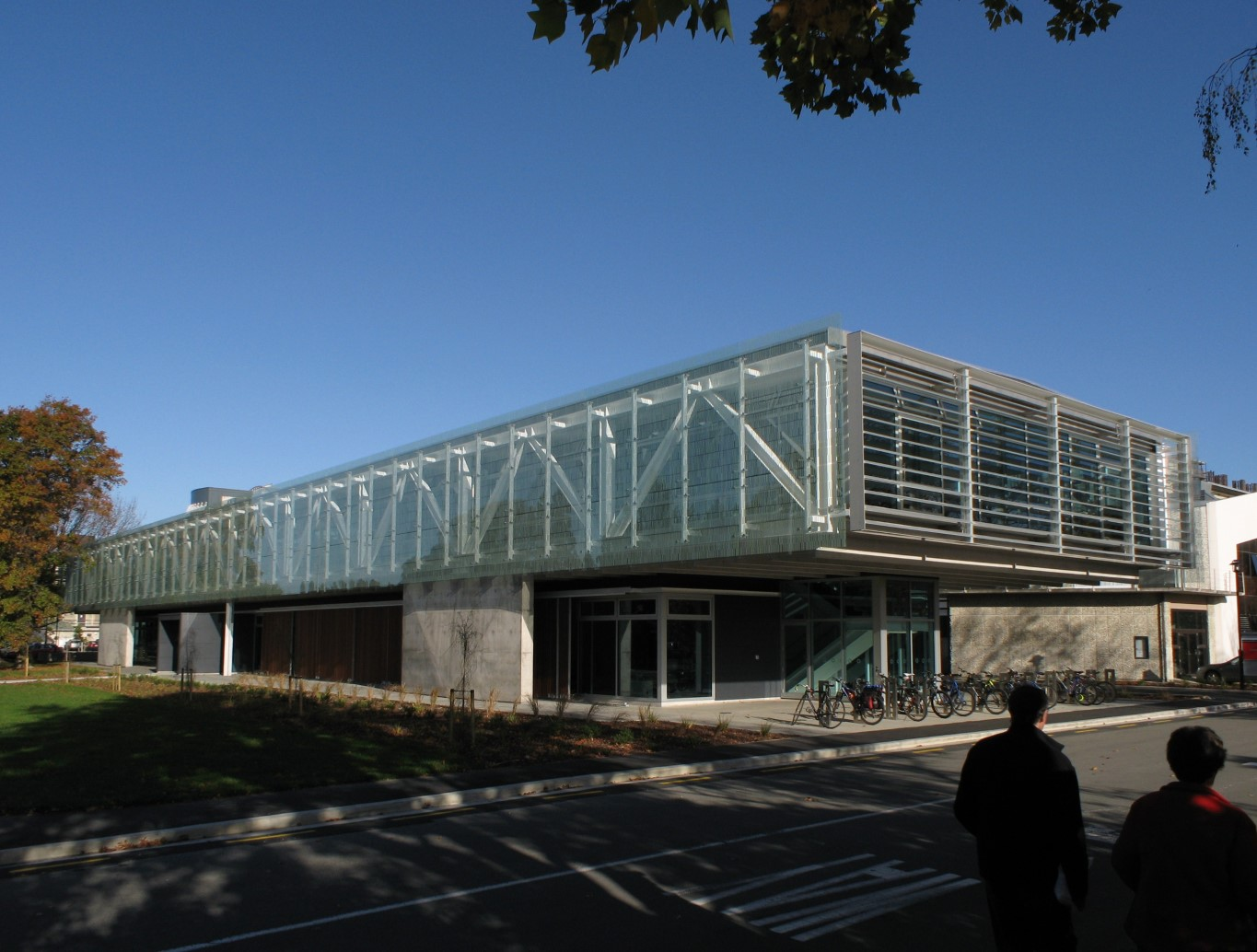
The NZi3 building shortly after construction

The NZi3 Innovation Institute is a partnership between the New Zealand government and the University of Canterbury. It was formed in 2006 to commercialise the university's IT research and to develop high-tech industry in Canterbury. A large eco-friendly office building in the university grounds was completed early 2009.

The following university departments and companies are associated with NZi3:

- HITLab NZ
- Geospatial Research Centre
- Wireless Research Centre

The NZi3 is also involved in the university's research in Nanotechnology, Assistive Technology, and Bioengineering.
