= Unikitty! =

American-Danish animated television series

- Genre: Comedy; Action; Adventure
- Based on: The Lego Movie & Unikitty by Phil Lord and Christopher Miller
- Developed by: Ed Skudder; Lynn Wang
- Voices of: Tara Strong; Grey Griffin; Kate Micucci; Roger Craig Smith; Eric Bauza; H. Michael Croner
- Theme music composer: Babymetal
- Opening theme: "Unikitty! Theme"
- Composer: Nick Keller
- Countries of origin: Denmark; United States
- Original language: English
- No. of seasons: 3
- No. of episodes: 104 (Note: One episode titled "Sick Day" was left unaired in the United States due to being unintentionally similar to the COVID-19 pandemic, but aired in other territories.)

Production
- Executive producers: Dan Lin; Phil Lord; Christopher Miller; Roy Lee; Jill Wilfert; Sam Register
- Producers: Ed Skudder (S1); Lynn Wang (S1); Ben Gruber; Liz Marshall
- Editors: Molly Yahr; Ryan Samsam; Ian Duncan
- Running time: 11 minutes
- Production companies: The Lego Group; Warner Bros. Animation

Original release
- Network: Cartoon Network
- Release: October 27, 2017 (Note: "Spoooooky Game" aired on this date as the first of three sneak previews before the series officially premiered on January 1, 2018. Subsequent sneak previews "Sparkle Matter Matters" aired on November 17, 2017 and "No Day Like Snow Day" aired on December 1, 2017.) – August 27, 2020

Unikitty! (stylized as UniKitty!) is an animated television series developed by Ed Skudder and Lynn Wang for Cartoon Network and produced by The Lego Group and Warner Bros. Animation. The series is based on and stars the character of the same name from The Lego Movie franchise, in which the series is part of.

== Premise ==
As the ruler of the Unikingdom, Princess Unikitty has various misadventures in her land with her brother Prince Puppycorn, scientist Dr. Fox, bodyguard Hawkodile, and advisor Richard. They also deal with the threats of Master Frown from the neighboring Frown Town.

== Characters ==
Princess Unikitty as she appears in the show

=== Main ===
- Princess Unikitty (speaking voice by Tara Strong and singing voice by Juliana Hansen) is the princess of the Unikingdom who is a cat/unicorn hybrid. She is very happy, playful, cute, and upbeat, but has an angry side that she sometimes struggles to control. She was previously voiced by Alison Brie in the original film and its sequel.
- Prince Puppycorn (voiced by Grey Griffin) is Unikitty's younger brother, a pug/unicorn hybrid. He is sometimes clueless and dimwitted, but is also loyal and good-hearted. He makes a cameo in The Lego Movie 2: The Second Part.
- Dr. Fox (voiced by Kate Micucci) is a red fox and the castle's resident scientist whose experiments and inventions can both create and resolve problems.
  - Dr. Fox's Robots are small robots that work for her.
- Hawkodile (voiced by Roger Craig Smith) is Unikitty's trusty hawk/crocodile hybrid bodyguard who has a "macho" personality and has a crush on Dr. Fox. He trained to be a fighter in the Action Forest and has a rival named Eagleator, who was his former best friend and an eagle/alligator hybrid.
- Richard (voiced by Roger Craig Smith) is a grey 1x3 Lego brick who is Unikitty's royal advisor and the castle's property caretaker. He speaks with a dull monotone voice and is often the voice of reason, though the others find him boring to listen to.
- Master Frown (voiced by Eric Bauza) is Unikitty's archenemy who comes from Frown Town at the other side of Unikitty's kingdom. He is one of the Doom Lords that spread pain and misery throughout the world as he wants to impress the other Doom Lords. This often causes him to suffer the wrath of Unikitty, who wants to spread fun and joy. In the series finale, Master Frown betrays the other Doom Lords and becomes friends with Unikitty and the rest of the main 5, in prior to his redemption. It is heavily implied (and confirmed in the end of the series) that he and his sidekick, Brock, are a couple.
- Brock (voiced by H. Michael Croner) is an anthropomorphic headstone with a neutral personality who is Master Frown's best friend since childhood, sidekick, and boyfriend (this is confirmed in the end of the series). Brock often hangs around his apartment playing video games rather than help Master Frown with his plots. The only time he gets angry is when Master Frown neglects his part of the chores. He is also Crankybeard's son.

=== Other ===
- Asteroid is a talking asteroid who appears in the episode "Asteroid Blues".
- Action Police is a police force who first appeared in "License To Punch".
- Batty is a dark purple and black bat citizen in the Unikingdom with a stand for legs.
- Beau (voiced by Tara Strong) is a blue square with yellow stripes.
- Beatsby is a yellow boombox with tiny-rounded arms and legs and light red eye sclerae. His toy counterpart has no arms and legs.
- Bim-Bom Liebowitz (voiced by H. Michael Croner when speaking, Roger Craig Smith when coughing) is an anthropomorphic green garbage bag or dumpling who has somewhat of a sassy and sometimes antagonistic personality.
- Burger Person (voiced by Tara Strong) is a cheeseburger citizen of Unikingdom who dislikes being eaten.
- Crabatar is a robot crab created by Dr. Fox who appeared in "Beach Daze" that is used to study crabs. At the end of the episode, she and the other robot crabs trap the gang in a "pinching dungeon" to torture them with pinching and she claims the Perfect Spot.
- Craig (voiced by Tara Strong) is a moose who works as a farmer with an Italian accent.
- Crankybeard (voiced by Eric Bauza) is a bluish-grey tombstone-shaped old man with one wheel for a left foot who resides in Frowntown. He is also Brock's father.
- Crazy Chicken is a chicken that is crafted out of a single brick.
- Candy Fighters are six sentient candies who were brought to life by the gang in the episode "The Very Best Candy" to compete against each other for dominance over which is the best candy.
- Cupcake Monster is a mutated cupcake created by Dr. Fox from "Crushing Defeat" that was blasted by Hawkodile.
- Dainty (voiced by Grey Griffin) is a blue circular-headed citizen with rectangular arms who usually drives a car.
- Dino Dude (voiced by Grey Griffin in 2017–18, Eric Bauza in 2018) is an Australian-accented Tyrannosaurus with wheels in place of legs.
- Doom Lords are a group of villainous individuals that Master Frown is a part of that make their lair in a tall building in Frown Town. In the series finale, they were betrayed by Master Frown as he quits and are defeated by the power of friendship afterwards.
  - Master Doom (voiced by Grey Griffin) is the leader of the Doom Lords. She has a tendency to chastise Master Frown for his various failures and appears menacing to the other Doom Lords. She is distinguished by her heterochromia iridum, or odd-eyes as she has one purple iris and one cyan iris.
  - Master Papercuts is a member of the Doom Lords with a paper hat. He is the butt of the jokes and claims to do a better job than Master Frown.
  - Master Malice is a member of the Doom Lords with long green horns.
  - Master Hazard (voiced by Roger Craig Smith) is a member of the Doom Lords with a fiery head and dark purple bat-like wings. He once burned down the Candy Corn Kingdom.
  - Master Misery (voiced by Tara Strong) is a member of the Doom Lords with an olive-green diamond-shaped face and dark blue hair obscuring the eyes.
  - Master Fear (voiced by Eric Bauza) is a member of the Doom Lords with a blue water drop-shaped face and hollow eye sockets.
  - Master Pain (voiced by Grey Griffin) is a female member of the Doom Lords with a white noh mask-like face and pale yellow pupil-less eyes.
  - Master Plague is a member of the Doom Lords with a green bird-like head and large eyes.
- Dr. Bunny is a minor character who only appears on the Everything Is Awesome Tween Dream Remix video for The Lego Movie 2: The Second Part. She and Dr. Fox are friends.
- Eagleator (voiced by Keith Ferguson) is an eagle/alligator hybrid and Hawkodile's rival and former best friend hailing from the Action Forest who wants to defeat him and take his shades after Sensei Falcamodo rewarded him with them.
- Esteban is a character from the episode "Roadtrip Ruckus". He is a friend of Really Old Edith.
- Father Time is the master of time who appeared in "Delivery Effect".
- Feebee (voiced by Grey Griffin) is a Southern-accented flower/bumblebee hybrid who runs "Feebee's Flower Shop". Her name is sometimes written as 'FeeBee'.
- Flamurtle (voiced by Natasha Leggero) is a flamingo/turtle hybrid with a blue mohawk hairstyle who was the main antagonist of the episode "The New Nemesis". She was Eagleator's other sworn nemesis besides Hawkodile. After being defeated by Hawkodile and Eagleator, she returns to her true arch-nemesis, Owlamander.
- Glandrea is a blue citizen whose head resembles a mountain with a flag on top.
- Gluppycorn is a minor character from "The Unikingdom Awards" who resembles Puppycorn with Unikitty's color scheme. He was seen crying while Schmunikitty consoles him after losing an award.
- Herbert Sherbert is an ice cream cone who works sells ice cream out of a pushcart. He also has a wife named Toni Spumoni-Sherbert.
- Hominid is a green genderless alien that moves around in a UFO.
- Kickflip (voiced by Tara Strong in most episodes, Grey Griffin in "Little Prince Puppycorn") is a pink skateboard-riding square.
- M'Ladybug (voiced by Tara Strong) is a ladybug with a purple shell.
- Owlamander (voiced by Grey Griffin) is a character from "The New Nemesis". She is an owl/salamander hybrid. She is the true arch-nemesis of Flamurtle.
- Old Timey Mustache Man (voiced by Eric Bauza) is a green old man citizen who likes bouncy houses.
- Q.T. (voiced by Tara Strong) is a pink oval-headed humanoid citizen of the Unikingdom with a magenta bow on her head.
- Really Old Edith (voiced by Grey Griffin) is a blue-hunched-over figure who is one of the oldest citizens of the Unikingdom.
- Rock Guy is a seemingly inanimate rock that is Puppycorn's friend.
- Ryott (voiced by Roger Craig Smith) is a green square man who screams instead of speaking.
- Schmunikitty is a character from "The Unikingdom Awards" that resembles Unikitty with Puppycorn's color scheme. She consoles Gluppycorn, who was crying over losing an award.
- Stellacopter is a purple creature with round hands that wears a fez that has a helicopter-like blade on it.
- Stocko (voiced by Kate Micucci) is a teal rectangle with arms and a bowler hat.
- Score Creeper (voiced by Roger Craig Smith) is a creepy Grim Reaper-like spirit villain who usually traps Unikitty and her friends in games such as "Spoooooky Game". He also tends to speak in rhyme.
- Tap-Dancing Butterfly (voiced by Grey Griffin) is a butterfly that likes to entertain an audience with her tap dancing.
- Ted Butter (vocal effects provided by Roger Craig Smith) is a green duck-like citizen with a vertical rectangle head and vertically stacked eyes and an antagonistic personality.
- The Tooth Fairy (voiced by Grey Griffin) is a fairy who collects teeth with a Bronx accent. She appears in "Tooth Trouble" and the end of the same episode, she punishes the gang for stealing teeth by taking theirs.
- Theodore (voiced by Roger Craig Smith) is a brown bear with a smooth voice, a square head, long arms, and short legs.
- Toaster (voiced by Roger Craig Smith) and Toast (voiced by H. Michael Croner) are a duo that consists of a toaster and a toast with arms that rides in him. They are sometimes referred to as the "Toast Bros".
- Trevor is a lion-like creature with flower petals surrounding his head.
- Townsperson (voiced by Roger Craig Smith) is an accident-prone citizen who is almost always in a dangerous situation.

== Episodes ==
Season	Episodes	Originally released	
Season	Episodes	First released	Last released
1	40	October 27, 2017	February 4, 2019
2	40	February 4, 2019	December 24, 2019
3	24	December 24, 2019	August 27, 2020

=== Season 1 (2017–19) ===
No.	Title	Directed by	Written by	Original release date	U.S. viewers (millions)
1	"Spoooooky Game"	Brock Gallagher	Chad Quandt and Aaron Waltke	October 27, 2017	0.99
After getting a haunted board game from a shopkeeper, Unikitty and the gang (except Richard) get sucked into the game and must try to avoid all obstacles to reach the end and escape, but Hawkodile and Dr. Fox fall victim to the shopkeeper and get left behind. Note: This episode aired as a sneak peek and the series' first Halloween special.
2	"Sparkle Matter Matters"	Ed Skudder and Lynn Wang	Ed Skudder and Lynn Wang	November 17, 2017	1.00
When Unikitty notices that Richard is the only unhappy person in the kingdom and has not produced any sparkle matter, she gets Dr. Fox to create a happy serum. The results are disastrous, however, when Richard's sparkle matter starts growing huge and out of control. Note: This episode aired as a second sneak peek and is the first episode produced.
3	"No Day Like Snow Day"	Brock Gallagher	Chad Quandt and Aaron Waltke	December 1, 2017	0.93
Master Frown sets out to ruin the gang's snow day, but gets stuck in Puppycorn's snowman (Snow Buttons) so he makes the gang believe that it is alive. Note: This episode aired as the third and final sneak peek and the series' first Christmas special.
4	"Action Forest"	Ed Skudder and Lynn Wang	Story by : Chad Quandt and Aaron Waltke; Teleplay by : Mike Olsen	January 1, 2018	0.65
When his old foe Eagleator defeats him and takes his shades, Hawkodile sends his friends into "Action Forest" to turn them into fighting machines (Unikitty becomes "The Loose Cannon", Puppycorn becomes "The Tired Veteran", Dr. Fox becomes "The Cyber Hacker", and Richard becomes "The Man of Few Words") to take him down. However, Unikitty repeatedly insists on making them hug, not fight. Note: This episode aired as the series premiere.
5	"Kaiju Kitty"	Casey Alexander	Chad Quandt and Aaron Waltke	January 1, 2018	0.63
Dr. Fox creates a giant robot called the "Shining MechaKitty Turbo V" for the gang to use so they can defend the Unikingdom from monsters, but they love it so much that, against all of Richard's advice, they use it for other purposes. However, the robot is too large and too strong to do these things safely, and the citizens start to fear it. Note: This episode is an obvious reference to Power Rangers and Voltron.
6	"Fire & Nice"	Casey Alexander	Chad Quandt and Aaron Waltke	January 1, 2018	0.64
On Problem Fixy Day in Unikingdom, Unikitty is helping out all of the citizens, but when an outburst goes a little too far, causing a lot of destruction (thanks to Master Frown), she wishes that her rage would not be part of her anymore. It comes true with the help of Dr. Fox's latest invention, but her rage goes out of control whenever she helps someone.
7	"Rock Friend"	Brock Gallagher	Story by : Chad Quandt and Aaron Waltke; Teleplay by : Aaron Preacher	January 1, 2018	0.78
When his friends are too busy to play with him, and having a rock as his only friend, Puppycorn is given advice by Unikitty to "make a friend". He takes this literally and makes a friend using the body parts of his friend named Friend Guy, and soon, things get out of hand when Friend Guy starts creating himself using other people and objects in the kingdom.
8	"Kitchen Chaos"	Casey Alexander	Story by : Chad Quandt and Aaron Waltke; Teleplay by : Kelsy Abbott	January 1, 2018	0.84
After injuring himself from working too hard cleaning up the gang's messes, Rick gets sent to bed while Unikitty and the rest fill in and clean the kitchen for him, but they soon start to find out it might not be the easiest chore.
9	"Crushing Defeat"	Casey Alexander	Chad Quandt and Aaron Waltke	January 1, 2018	0.86
When Hawkodile develops a secret crush on Dr. Fox, his sparkle matter starts literally crushing him down into a smaller size. But, due to his rough exterior, he is too embarrassed to tell Dr. Fox (or anyone, in that matter). The rest of the gang tries help him get the confidence to admit his feelings for her, before it gets out of hand.
10	"Wishing Well"	Brock Gallagher	Chad Quandt and Aaron Waltke	January 5, 2018	1.16
Unikitty and Puppycorn free the wish coins that are stuck in a wishing well, not knowing that they have turned evil during their time down the hole. Eventually, the coins start ruining everyone's wishes and it is up to the team to gather better wish items to defeat the coins.
11	"Hide N' Seek"	Casey Alexander	Chad Quandt and Aaron Waltke	January 12, 2018	0.89
On Hide N' Seek Day, Unikitty is once again the Hide N' Seek champion, but when she finds everyone in the Unikingdom except Richard, it drives her crazy and it sends her on a search to find him, even if it means traveling all over the world.
12	"Stuck Together"	Brock Gallagher	Chad Quandt and Aaron Waltke	January 19, 2018	0.75
When Master Frown loses his body after accidentally falling off the top of the kingdom castle, Unikitty decides to tow his head around on her rear end. He needs to make it to a meeting of the Doom Lords in time, but first Unikitty has to do her duties, with Frown as help. When the two make it to the meeting, Master Doom scolds Master Frown for being late and fires him, causing all the Doom Lords to laugh at him, Master Frown to cry, Brock to drop his juice box, and Unikitty to be pushed over the edge that she destroys the lair with her sheer rage. Unikitty and Master Frown then apologize for their actions.
13	"Little Prince Puppycorn"	Brock Gallagher	Chad Quandt and Aaron Waltke	January 26, 2018	0.77
Unikitty makes Puppycorn the ruler of the kingdom (as he is a prince, since his sister is a princess), but when he overflows his royal power, Unikitty and the others must come to the rescue.
14	"Pet Pet"	Casey Alexander and Careen Ingle	Chad Quandt and Aaron Waltke	February 2, 2018	0.66
The gang adopts a creature named 'Pet Pet', contrary to Richard's wishes. When they lose him, Unikitty must pose as Pet Pet to distract Richard and avoid getting in trouble while Hawkodile sets out to find him.
15	"Kitty Court"	Careen Ingle	Chad Quandt and Aaron Waltke	February 9, 2018	0.75
When Unikitty slightly "hits" Master Frown with her Cloud Car, Frown takes the case to court, where he is hoping Unikitty will end up in jail. He eventually realizes that Unikitty Court is much too happy and upbeat to have consequences, so he starts to get upset that the court is not going how he planned. When Unikitty notices, she tries to make the court exactly to his liking.
16	"Birthday Blowout"	Ed Skudder and Lynn Wang	Ed Skudder and Lynn Wang	February 16, 2018	0.65
On Puppycorn's birthday, Master Frown and Brock are invited to his party by Unikitty. Eventually, however, after Frown steals Puppycorn's candle (which Puppycorn can make his wish with), Unikitty and Puppycorn race to Frown Town to rescue it before it melts completely, and Unikitty finds herself in a mech fight against him.
17	"Lab Cat"	Casey Alexander	Chad Quandt and Aaron Waltke	February 23, 2018	0.71
A comet Dr. Fox believes is a giant gumball arrives to Unikingdom finally. For her to get a sample of it, she sends Unikitty and Puppycorn on a trip to space in her rocket to obtain it, but soon fears the worst when they are endangered during the mission.
18	"The Zone"	Brock Gallagher	Chad Quandt and Aaron Waltke	March 2, 2018	0.92
During the gang's video game time, Dr. Fox is captured by her own security robot thanks to Unikitty's rage after she almost immediately gets a game over in the final boss. The robot blasts at the super-powered video game controller turning Hawkodile, Puppycorn, and Rick into 16-bit versions of themselves. With Unikitty at the helm of controlling them like a real life video game via the controller, she uses this as an advantage to go rescue Dr. Fox.
19	"Too Many Unikitties"	Casey Alexander	Story by : Chad Quandt and Aaron Waltke; Teleplay by : Aaron Preacher	March 12, 2018	0.54
When Unikitty notices that her friends are having a stressful day (Richard is obsessed with getting his chores done, Hawkodile is keeping a tight vigilance for troublemakers, Puppycorn got himself stuck in an old boot and is unable to get free, and Dr. Fox is panicking about a reactor leak in her lab), she believes everyone should be positive like her. With the help of an invention by Dr. Fox called the Happy Horn (a model of Unikitty's horn that, when placed on someone's head, it causes a purple cloud to explode around them as their brainwaves are replaced with Unikitty's, and when the purple cloud disappears, it gives the wearer the mindset of Unikitty, a new color scheme, Unikitty's abilities, and as well as their very own rage form) that becomes a reality, but things get out of hand when she soon starts to realize she misses her friends' old personalities. Note: "Happy Just Like Me" is listed as "Too Many Unikittys" in the end credits.
20	"Film Fest"	Brock Gallagher	Chad Quandt and Aaron Waltke	March 12, 2018	0.50
At the Unikingdom Film Festival, the gang is excited to show the citizens their films: Unikitty and Puppycorn with their action film, Hawkodile with his romance film, and Dr. Fox with her sci-fi musical. However, when Richard keeps trying to get his movie to be shown, the gang thinks it will be boring and try to stall as long as they can.
21	"Unikitty News"	Careen Ingle	Chad Quandt and Aaron Waltke	March 12, 2018	0.48
Unikitty and Puppycorn host a variety news show, with Hawkodile as the weather reporter, Puppycorn with sports, and Dr. Fox with science/cooking. It soon turns into a disaster, however, when Dr. Fox's cooking opens up a black hole.
22	"Dinner Apart-y"	Careen Ingle	Chad Quandt and Aaron Waltke	April 9, 2018	0.66
Brock invites Unikitty and Puppycorn to a dinner party with him and Master Frown, but soon, when Master Frown starts focusing on his job to make people miserable instead of enjoying the party, it soon causes their friendship to fall apart, so Unikitty and Puppycorn try to bring them back together.
23	"R & Arr"	Bill Reiss	Story by : Chad Quandt and Aaron Waltke; Teleplay by : Mikey Heller	April 13, 2018	0.72
Unikitty and Puppycorn just want to veg out on Lazy Sunday, but it is also Chore Day, and Richard keeps trying to force chores on them. They try to escape him by being lazy pirates, and set sail using the couch as a pirate ship to rescue Dr. Fox and Hawkodile from chores, but when they enter Unikitty's room, which is a big mess, Richard uses this as an advantage to get them to do chores by joining the pirate idea and shoot cleaning supplies at them.
24	"License to Punch"	Brock Gallagher	Story by : Chad Quandt and Aaron Waltke; Teleplay by : Matt Loman	April 20, 2018	0.74
After Hawkodile gets caught by two members of the Action Police for battling a giant monster without an action license, Unikitty and her friends try to help Hawkodile get rid of his action urges. If Hawkodile does not keep his urges under control, he will lose his shades. There is only one way to earn his action license: take the action test at "The Department of Mayhem and Violence". With Unikitty's help, he may be able to get it even when the Action Police plan to make sure he doesn't pass.
25	"Buggin' Out"	Brock Gallagher	Story by : Chad Quandt and Aaron Waltke; Teleplay by : Mikey Heller	June 4, 2018 (Note: This episode was first released online by Warner Bros. on April 28, 2018.)	0.49
While watching a movie, the gang finds a creepy spider to their fear. They want to squash it, but Unikitty wants it to be loved. When the others tell her to squash it, she lets it roam free. It soon becomes a disaster, however, when the spider lays eggs, resulting in tons of spiders invading the castle. Soon the gang gets caught in the spider's web, leaving it up to Unikitty to get rid of the spiders and save the day using Dr. Fox's mech.
26	"Chair"	Casey Alexander and Careen Ingle	Story by : Chad Quandt and Aaron Waltke; Teleplay by : Lynn Wang and Ed Skudder	June 4, 2018	0.47
Unikitty finds an old, beat-up recliner on the curb on Trash Day, but sees its inner beauty and believes it can make dreams come true, so she decides to bring it home and introduce it to the gang. In a series of absurd and fun vignettes, they discover how the dirty, inanimate chair comes into each of their lives and changes them for the better, however Richard does not see what makes the chair so great and tries to get rid of it.
27	"Kickflip McPuppycorn"	Careen Ingle	Story by : Chad Quandt and Aaron Waltke; Teleplay by : Greg White	June 4, 2018	0.62
After buying a skateboard, Puppycorn is determined to impress his skater friends with a stunt, but he fails. Soon Dr. Fox creates a plan to create cloaks to aid Puppycorn in his second try at a stunt, but when he succeeds at impressing his friends, he gets himself into trouble when he is entered into the Skater Stunt Games, the most dangerous skate obstacle course.
28	"Super Amazing Raft Adventure"	Brock Gallagher	Story by : Chad Quandt and Aaron Waltke; Teleplay by : Mikey Heller	June 4, 2018	0.63
Hawkodile tells Unikitty about a Bodyguard Boat he is building and decides they should use it to test his survival skills and show that he is prepared for anything. When they get lost out at sea, Unikitty's ideas seem to work while Hawkodile realizes maybe he is not prepared for anything.
29	"Tasty Heist"	Careen Ingle	Story by : Chad Quandt and Aaron Waltke; Teleplay by : Matt Loman	June 4, 2018	0.67
When Unikitty finds out Richard has the most tastiest ice cream planned, she gets excited. However, when Richard says they will not get the dessert until after the dinner he is cooking, Unikitty sets up a heist with Dr. Fox, Hawkodile, and Puppycorn to secretly retrieve the dessert without Richard knowing.
30	"Brawl Bot"	Brock Gallagher	Story by : Chad Quandt and Aaron Waltke; Teleplay by : Greg White	June 4, 2018	0.43
Dr. Fox is proud to unveil her new ultimate combat machine and take it into an underground scientist fighting ring. But Hawkodile is jealous of the fighting bot and declares he can beat anything it can, so he dons a robot costume to enter the ring, planning to defeat Dr. Fox's robot to prove he's the better fighter.
31	"Beach Daze"	Bill Reiss, Ed Skudder, and Lynn Wang	Story by : Chad Quandt and Aaron Waltke; Teleplay by : Emily Brundige	July 23, 2018	0.52
Unikitty and the gang gear up for a fun day at the beach, but Master Frown uses his position as lifeguard-in-training to spoil their plans. They embark on a beach quest to find the legendary Perfect Spot, far away from Frown's tyrannical rule. Though Master Frown and Brock are not far behind.
32	"Big Pup, Little Problem"	Ed Skudder and Lynn Wang	Chad Quandt and Aaron Waltke	July 23, 2018	0.67
In an attempt to help Dino-Dude with his stomach problem, the gang plan to shrink down to tiny size and go into Dino-Dude's stomach, they do shrink down but when Puppycorn shows up, he believes the gang is action figures. At first, they enjoy being Puppycorn's toys, but when they find out that Puppycorn plays rough, they try to escape.
33	"Tragic Magic"	Brock Gallagher	Story by : Chad Quandt and Aaron Waltke; Teleplay by : Kyle McVey	July 23, 2018	0.57
After Richard puts on an amateur magic show, Dr. Fox becomes obsessed with figuring out how his science-defying tricks are done, but she goes a bit too far and upsets him after spoiling his magic tricks. After a giant bunny monster creates in the lab, Richard will have to use his tricks to stop it.
34	"Dancer Danger"	Careen Ingle	Story by : Chad Quandt and Aaron Waltke; Teleplay by : Matt Loman	July 23, 2018	0.56
An upcoming dance party is coming to the Unikingdom and everyone is excited to show off their moves, except Richard, who believes he has no groove. Unikitty decides to help, but nothing works, soon Dr. Fox decides to help him by showing off her newest invention: Grooveatron, a robot that will let Richard do some dance moves, but soon the robot gets a mind of its own and the gang has to defeat it in a dance-off.
35	"Landlord Lord"	Brock Gallagher	Story by : Chad Quandt and Aaron Waltke; Teleplay by : Matty Smith	August 17, 2018	0.46
The landlord has threatened Master Frown and Brock with eviction unless they fix their apartment. Brock invites Unikitty and the gang to help. Instead of doing what Master Frown and Brock want to their place, she proceeds to do what she wants.
36	"Scary Tales"	Casey Alexander	Chad Quandt and Aaron Waltke	October 19, 2018 (Note: This episode first aired on March 16, 2018 in the United Kingdom and Ireland, on May 28, 2018 in Germany and Poland, and on September 5, 2018 in France.)	0.47
During the gang's Halloween party, Unikitty discovers Richard isn't so easily scared, so the gang engage in scary stories to try and scare him; Hawkodile's story is about him chasing down a guy with chainsaw hands and a hockey mask, Puppycorn's story is about a ghost in the TV, Dr. Fox's story is about a monster made from Halloween candy and Unikitty's is about a stain on the carpet, which seems to affect Richard.
37	"Float On"	Ed Skudder and Lynn Wang	Chad Quandt and Aaron Waltke	November 21, 2018 (Note: This episode first aired on October 13, 2018 in Australia.)	0.66
Unikitty plans a parade to celebrate being unique, with everyone designing their own personalized floats. But when Master Frown crashes the parade to bring misery to the citizens of Unikingdom, Unikitty and the gang try to stop him.
38	"Space Mission: Danger"	Ed Skudder and Lynn Wang	Story by : Chad Quandt and Aaron Waltke; Teleplay by : Kyle McVey	December 21, 2018	0.59
After their spaceship explodes, Unikitty and the gang float helplessly through space. As they try to formulate a plan that will get them home safe, they flashback to how each of them is responsible for their ship being destroyed.
39	"Top of the Naughty List"	Careen Ingle	Ben Gruber	December 21, 2018	0.59
On Christmas Eve, Master Frown decides to tell a holiday bedtime story to Brock about him stealing all the presents (the story plays out in the style of Die Hard) and Unikitty and the gang try to foil his evil plans to ruin Christmas.
40	"BatKitty"	Careen Ingle	Story by : Chad Quandt and Aaron Waltke; Teleplay by : Matty Smith	February 4, 2019	0.46
After stumbling upon Batman's suit after a mix-up at the laundromat, Unikitty decides to take on the persona of Batman, which gives Master Frown a chance to step up his game and hatch a plan so evil, that Unikitty can't do it alone. She calls on her friends (dressed as Robin (Dick Grayson and Carrie Kelley), Nightwing, and Alfred Pennyworth) to help her in defeating Master Frown and Brock (dressed as Joker and Harley Quinn) and foiling their plans. Meanwhile, the real Batman demands for his suit to be back, but Unikitty refuses to give up the fun. Note: Will Arnett guest stars as Bruce Wayne / Batman. Arnett reprises his role from the films.

=== Season 2 (2019) ===
No. overall	No. in season	Title	Directed by	Written by	Original release date	U.S. viewers (millions)
41	1	"Pool Duel"	Careen Ingle	Story by : Chad Quandt and Aaron Waltke; Teleplay by : Jordan Morris	February 4, 2019	0.48
It's now summertime which gives the gang a chance to have fun in the pool. But Puppycorn is afraid of the deep end, so Unikitty and the rest try to help him and show him how cool the deep end is, but Master Frown is destined to make things worse to increase Puppycorn's fright.
42	2	"Tooth Trouble"	Careen Ingle	Chad Quandt and Aaron Waltke	February 5, 2019	0.49
After an accident, Puppycorn knocks his tooth out. After waiting for the Tooth Fairy, she doesn't show up, which leaves Unikitty to pose as the Tooth Fairy exclusively for Puppycorn. She soon takes up the opportunity to help the Tooth Fairy with her job along with her friends, which soon leads to disaster when they go too far.
43	3	"This Spells Disaster"	Brock Gallagher	Chad Quandt and Aaron Waltke	February 5, 2019	0.54
The gang is planning a surprise for Puppycorn, so they spell things out when talking so he won't find out. Desperate to know what they're saying, Puppycorn finds a magic spell book that he thinks will help him learn to spell.
44	4	"Roadtrip Ruckus"	Careen Ingle	Story by : Chad Quandt and Aaron Waltke; Teleplay by : Emily Brundige	February 6, 2019	0.36
Richard finds the opportunity to take the others on a road trip, but soon the road trip turns haywire with bathroom breaks, stops to fix the tires and the van itself, interdimensional space/time travel, crumbs, road rage worriness, and an "evil truck" (in a reference to Duel).
45	5	"Memory Amok"	Ed Skudder and Lynn Wang	Story by : Chad Quandt and Aaron Waltke; Teleplay by : AJ Watts	February 6, 2019	0.38
After Puppycorn sees Unikitty do the most embarrassing thing ever (Unikitty's tail popping off by accident), she forces him to forget by hooking him up to Dr. Fox's memory machine. While throwing away the bad memories and keeping the good ones, the gang looks back at the past memories together (clips from past episodes in a clip-show style format).
46	6	"Election Day"	Brock Gallagher	Story by : Chad Quandt and Aaron Waltke; Teleplay by : Adeline Colangelo	February 7, 2019	0.48
Unikitty and Frown decide to have the first-ever Election Day in the Unikingdom to see who would rule the kingdom as Princess. This eventually leads to a heated competition when Master Frown pretends to be nice and gives free things away in order to win the hearts of the citizens, while Unikitty tries to win her way, much to the disappointment of the citizens.
47	7	"No Sleep Sleepover"	Ed Skudder and Lynn Wang	Story by : Chad Quandt and Aaron Waltke; Teleplay by : Aaron Preacher	February 7, 2019	0.50
Unikitty and the gang (including Brock) decide to challenge themselves to stay up all night in order to meet the Sandman. After a night of activities, they start to notice that everything is not what it seems.
48	8	"Unfairgrounds"	Ed Skudder	Story by : Chad Quandt and Aaron Waltke; Teleplay by : Emily Brundige	February 8, 2019	0.38
49	9	"Unfairgrounds"	Lynn Wang	Matty Smith	February 8, 2019	0.38
Part 1: The gang arrives at Doki Diamond Funland, their favorite amusement park to ride the life-changing ride called The Sugar Crash. When Master Frown arrives to get everyone out of the line, Unikitty and the gang try and stop him. Part 2: Master Frown, Brock, and the gang finally get to ride the ride now that the line is empty. However, when the ride turns into a never-ending nightmare when it keeps going on and on, the gang tries to escape the ride before they're stuck on it forever. Note: This two-parter aired on the same day The Lego Movie 2: The Second Part premiered in theaters.
50	10	"Kitty & Hawk"	Adriel Garcia	Story by : Chad Quandt and Aaron Waltke; Teleplay by : Kyle McVey	February 11, 2019	0.37
When Puppycorn's toy dump truck goes "missing", Unikitty and Hawkodile turn into buddy cops and track it down, car hood sliding, stunt driving and delivering cool one liners along the way to crack the case while Richard is forced to be The Chief (even though he doesn't want to be).
51	11	"Camp Unikitty"	Neil Graf	Story by : Chad Quandt and Aaron Waltke; Teleplay by : Kyle McVey	February 12, 2019	0.46
When they think nature is gross and dangerous, Unikitty takes Dr. Fox, Rick, and Puppycorn through the woods to prove that it's not all that gross, while Hawkodile stays back and defends the van from creepy raccoons.
52	12	"Hawkodile Sensei"	Brock Gallagher	Story by : Chad Quandt and Aaron Waltke; Teleplay by : Greg White	February 13, 2019	0.42
After destroying a group of chipmunks' tree, Hawkodile takes them under his care to train them into unstoppable fighting machines as Hawk's sensei trained him to be, but Unikitty believes this is wrong seeing as how the chipmunks are just kids.
53	13	"Perfect Moment"	Careen Ingle	Story by : Chad Quandt and Aaron Waltke; Teleplay by : Dani Michaeli	February 14, 2019	0.33
On Valentine's Day, Hawkodile is planning to get Dr. Fox to be his valentine, but there's never a perfect moment to confess his love, so Unikitty and her friends are destined to help him find the perfect moment to confess to her.
54	14	"P.L.O.T. Device"	Neil Graf	Jordan Morris	February 15, 2019	0.44
When everyone starts experiencing dangerously low boredom levels, Dr. Fox introduces her new invention: the P.L.O.T. Device, which can make anything exciting happen, but it starts getting out of control when it's used too much.
55	15	"Who Took Toast"	Adriel Garcia	Matty Smith	February 18, 2019	0.46
When Toast is kidnapped at the party, Unikitty becomes a detective to track him down. On the way her and the gang run into secret passageways and clues.
56	16	"Rainbow Race"	Brock Gallagher	Brady Klosterman	February 19, 2019	0.50
When Frowntown goes sadder than usual, Unikitty and the others decide to deliver a rainbow to them to cheer them up, but Master Frown is destined to stop them in the style of Mad Max.
57	17	"Beep"	Neil Graf	Story by : Chad Quandt and Aaron Waltke; Teleplay by : Katie Matilla	February 20, 2019	0.43
On Taco Tuesday, Unikitty and her friends are making the best tacos ever, but mysterious beeping fills the castle, giving the gang stress. Unikitty explains they're Bad Vibe Detectors that detect sadness and try to figure out who's sad, when they discover no one's sad, Unikitty takes them into therapy to test if they're upset.
58	18	"Delivery Effect"	Brock Gallagher	Jordan Morris	February 21, 2019	0.39
After ordering food and it never comes, Dr. Fox introduces her latest invention: The Time Machine, which will let the gang make time go faster to get their order, but Father Time isn't happy about the use of time travel.
59	19	"Lazer Tag"	Adriel Garcia	Nick Wiger	February 22, 2019	0.41
When the gang get tired of doing everything together, a laser tag game opens up in front of them out of nowhere. They soon find out Score Creeper (from Spoooooky Game) is in charge of this place, and pit them in a laser tag game against another team. During the game, Unikitty insists they work together to win, but the others would rather be a Lone Wolf.
60	20	"Trapped in Paradise"	Neil Graf	Brady Klosterman	February 25, 2019	0.47
When the gang get deserted on an island after an accident with a hot air balloon trip, they find comfort and enjoyment while Richard freaks out about chores at home.
61	21	"Prank War"	Adriel Garcia	Story by : Chad Quandt and Aaron Waltke; Teleplay by : Mikey Heller	February 25, 2019	0.47
At the Zoo, Master Frown pranks the gang, which prompts them to devise plans to prank him back. Unikitty wants to prank too, but doesn't seem to understand the concept of a prank when she believes they are too mean, pranking Master Frown nicely instead of in mean ways, which worries the rest of the gang.
62	22	"Safety First"	Adriel Garcia	Kevin Fleming and Rob Janas	February 26, 2019	0.44
When the gang notice Puppycorn is very accident-prone, Richard puts him in his old safety suit. It protects someone from any dangerous thing, but soon Puppycorn thinks that he can survive anything and starts doing very dangerous stunts.
63	23	"Volcano"	Brock Gallagher	Ed Skudder and Lynn Wang	February 26, 2019	0.44
A mountain in the Unikingdom becomes a volcano when it gets in a very bad mood, so the gang tries to cheer it up by borrowing one of Feebee's most precious flowers, but Feebee herself isn't happy about it and tries to direct the gang in a dangerous path to the volcano. Note This episode is a parody of the ending scene in The Lord of the Rings: The Return of the King.
64	24	"First Flight"	Careen Ingle	Tobi Wilson	February 27, 2019	0.43
Unikitty and Puppycorn try to help Richard overcome his fear of flying in airplane while Hawkodile takes his flight test, but Richard can't seem to stop being afraid, no matter what.
65	25	"Cheerleading"	Careen Ingle	Ed Skudder and Lynn Wang	February 27, 2019	0.43
At Unikingdom's Cheerleading Competition, Brock vows to make his dream of being a flyer on the cheer team a reality, but Really Old Edith and her team shakes it up and competes with them, making the competition heated.
66	26	"Rag Tag"	Brock Gallagher	Jordan Morris	February 28, 2019	0.45
When the citizens become bored and un-inspired, Unikitty takes it upon herself to re-inspire and excite them with a game of kickball. When the Doom Lords return to play against the gang, and the castle is at stake, the team must step up their game, but Unikitty wants them to be "ragtag" and tries to help her team lose.
67	27	"Career Day"	Adriel Garcia	Brady Klosterman	February 28, 2019	0.45
Richard notices the gang spending their money irresponsibly and the Golden Goose can no longer lay any more golden eggs, so he makes them get jobs. Unikitty decides to open her own business called Grandma Richard's, where they sell cookies.
68	28	"Asteroid Blues"	Adriel Garcia	Kevin Fleming and Rob Janas	March 1, 2019	0.48
An asteroid is heading to hit the world and it's up to Dr. Fox and the gang to plant a bomb to blow it up. However, when it's revealed that the asteroid is alive and can talk, everyone hangs out with him, until the asteroid realizes Dr. Fox's original intentions. The gang then chases after him to remove the bomb before he explodes, but he's too sad to listen.
69	29	"The Big Trip"	Neil Graf	Matty Smith	March 1, 2019	0.48
Hawkodile is tired of having to take care of the gang so much on their vacations, but they eventually persuade him as long as they follow his vacation training. They're put through selfie training, eating metal to gain guts of steel and to hold it in for the bathroom in order to be prepared for the next vacation.
70	30	"Late Night Talky Time"	Neil Graf	Jordan Morris	December 24, 2019	0.33
The moon is bored of taking the nightshift, since everyone’s always asleep. So Unikitty leads the gang in putting on an over-the-top late night talk show to keep the moon occupied.
71	31	"Welcome to the Unikingdom"	Careen Ingle	Ed Skudder and Lynn Wang	December 24, 2019	0.33
After Unikitty finds out that tourism is down, she recruits the gang to make a tourism video to inspire people to visit the kingdom. But after calamities come one after another, Unikitty begins to think the video is going to be a disaster.
72	32	"Time Capsule"	Adriel Garcia	James Hamilton	December 24, 2019	0.29
The gang puts their favorite items in a Time Capsule to send 100 years in the future, but they get stuck inside right before the door seals.
73	33	"Music Videos"	Careen Ingle	Ed Skudder and Lynn Wang	December 24, 2019	0.29
Unikitty hosts a live music video countdown show for the kingdom, presenting the ecstatic audience with the top 4 music videos in the Unikingdom, featuring our favorite characters.
74	34	"Brock Most Wanted"	Neil Graf	Matty Smith	December 24, 2019	0.26
When Master Frown starts ruining parties to earn a promotion from his bosses, the Doom Lords, Brock accidentally gets blamed for the calamity.
75	35	"Bedtime Stories"	Neil Graf	Jordan Morris	December 24, 2019	0.26
When Puppycorn can't fall asleep, Dr. Fox uses an invention to bring classic bedtime stories to life. But the gang’s presence leads to some surprising twists in these popular tales.
76	36	"Grown Up Stuff"	Careen Ingle	Nick Wiger	December 24, 2019	0.26
Puppycorn doesn't want to grow up. To ease his woes, Unikitty spends the day teaching him all the fun things about being an adult.
77	37	"Stop the Presses"	Brock Gallagher	Kevin Fleming and Rob Janas	December 24, 2019	0.26
Richard’s newspapers aren't selling, so his friends pull out all the stops to put the printed word back on top.
78	38	"Castles and Kitties"	Careen Ingle	Jordan Morris	December 24, 2019	0.28
Score Creeper traps the gang in a fantasy role playing game where they must follow a complex set of rules to win their freedom.
79	39	"Brain Trust"	Careen Ingle	Becky Tinkler	December 24, 2019	0.28
Dr. Fox accidentally transports the gang inside her brain, where they must control her movements to complete a dangerous experiment.
80	40	"Dunklecorn"	Brock Gallagher	Merrill Hagan	December 24, 2019	0.30
A mysterious relative shows up and claims to be Unikitty and Puppycorn's uncle, but Hawkodile is suspicious.

=== Season 3 (2019–20) ===
No. overall	No. in season	Title	Directed by	Written by	Original release date	U.S. viewers (millions)
81	1	"Growing Pains"	Neil Graf	Matty Smith	December 24, 2019	0.30
Puppycorn is annoyed that Unikitty is always helping him and treating him like a little kid. Not wanting to be a "little brother" anymore, he eats some of Dr. Fox's "growing taffy" to literally grow bigger.
82	2	"Wiener Club"	Brock Gallagher	Kevin Fleming and Rob Janas	December 24, 2019	0.34
Puppycorn is determined to become the Hot Dog King and joins an underground hot dog eating contest called Wiener Club. Rick warns "you are what you eat," but Puppycorn doesn't listen and eats so many hot dogs he becomes the new champion of Wiener Club. Unfortunately he also literally turns into a hot dog, that the other club members reveal they are going to eat! Unikitty and the gang now must attack with fruits and vegetables and defeat the hot dog-eating gluttons in order to save the giant hot-dog-shaped Puppycorn and turn him back to normal.
83	3	"Trapped in the Tower"	Careen Ingle	Ed Skudder and Lynn Wang	December 24, 2019	0.34
During the fireworks show, Unikitty and Master Frown were trapped in the horns on the Unikitty Castle when she caught Master Frown trying to mess up the fireworks. Unikitty tried to find out why Master Frown always grumbled.
84	4	"Special Delivery"	Adriel Garcia	Patrick Rieger	December 24, 2019	0.36
After being rudely interrupted by Bim-Bom during her morning song, Unikitty takes advice from her friends and writes down her feelings in a letter. She intends to keep it to herself, but accidentally sends it.
85	5	"Scary Tales 2"	Adriel Garcia	Steve Clemmons	December 24, 2019	0.36
It's Halloween again and the gang is telling scary stories to some trick or treaters.
86	6	"Old Lady Bodyguard"	Brock Gallagher	Ed Skudder, Lynn Wang, Kevin Fleming, and Rob Janas	March 8, 2020	0.27
After being bought at a charity auction, Hawkodile is forced to spend the day as Old Lady Edith's personal bodyguard.
87	7	"Too Cool"	Careen Ingle	Zack Keller	March 8, 2020	0.27
Puppycorn needs a lesson on how to be cool. The gang is more than happy to teach him, until his coolness freezes the whole kingdom.
88	8	"Guardian of the Unikingdom"	Neil Graf	Steve Clemmons	March 15, 2020	0.27
Hawkodile insists the Unikingdom is more dangerous than it looks and sets out to prove it by taking his friends on bodyguard patrol.
89	9	"Cast Aside the Truth"	Neil Graf	James Hamilton	March 22, 2020	0.25
Hawkodile breaks his arm in a careless spill and lies to his friends about the accident to keep things from looking bad.
90	10	"Unikitty and the Ice Pop Factory"	Brock Gallagher	Alan Denton and Greg Hahn	March 29, 2020	0.27
An eccentric figure announces a contest to tour her marvelous ice pop factory, sending the gang on a frantic quest to find the winning popsicle stick.
91	11	"Sunken Treasure"	Neil Graf	Alan Denton and Greg Hahn	April 5, 2020	0.25
A relaxing beach day becomes an underwater adventure when Unikitty and her friends find a message in a bottle.
92	12	"Dawn of the Donut"	Brock Gallagher	Steve Borst	August 17, 2020	0.22
Dr. Fox's plan to deliver donuts all over the kingdom are sidetracked by Unikitty's reluctance to follow instructions.
93	13	"P.L.O.T. Device 2: Beyond the Bored Dome"	Neil Graf	Patrick Rieger	August 17, 2020	0.22
Following up where it started, Dr. Fox reprograms the P.L.O.T. Device just to only generate boring events, but the gang can't help but add drama and excitement to every scenario, but then, Rick keeps on pressing the P.LO.T. Device due to a lot of excitement and either, over Rick's Evil Clone, and Richard decided to use the Overdrive Switch to make everyone bored out of existence, and cause the world to lose its color. He and Evil Rick went to bring back excitement to restore the world, and Evil Rick fades out from existence for despising Jazz Music, leads to the destruction of the P.L.O.T. Device. Note: This episode is a sequel continuation of the first P.L.O.T. Device episode.
94	14	"The New Nemesis"	Brock Gallagher	Steve Borst	August 18, 2020	0.29
When Hawkodile discovers his old enemy Eagleator has a new nemesis in his life, the gang do all they can to get Hawk back on his foe's radar.
95	15	"Baby Caterpillar"	Brock Gallagher	Becky Wangberg & Sarah Eisenberg	August 18, 2020	0.29
Unikitty takes in a radioactive caterpillar and raises it like a baby, unaware of the havoc it will wreak as a full-grown adult.
96	16	"Borrowed"	Neil Graf	Patrick Rieger	August 19, 2020	0.26
Richard discovers his library books have been borrowed by Master Frown and sets off on a crazed mission to return the books before they're overdue.
97	17	"Sick Day"	Careen Ingle	Patrick Rieger	September 13, 2020 (Note: "Sick Day" was skipped when the series first aired in the United States due to the then-ongoing COVID-19 pandemic, but aired in proper sequence overseas. The date is of the first overseas airing from Canada.)	N/A
Dr. Fox catches the "common cold" and does everything in her power to cure herself, ignoring the gang's pleas that she takes the day off and rest.
98	18	"Best Best Friends"	Careen Ingle	Zee Risek	August 19, 2020	0.26
Master Frown and Brock attend a friendship-themed competition intending to ruin it for everyone else, but soon discover their own friendship in need of repair.
99	19	"The Escape Room of Doom"	Neil Graf	Jordan Morris	August 20, 2020	N/A
The gang infiltrate an escape room game center to thwart Score Creeper, but their former foe claims he only works there to pay the bills.
100	20	"Last One There"	Ed Skudder and Lynn Wang	Patrick Rieger	August 24, 2020	0.20
When Unikitty accidentally invokes an ancient curse, the gang must beat Master Frown and Brock back to the castle to avoid getting turned into rotten eggs.
101	21	"The Very Best Candy"	Careen Ingle	Zack Keller	August 25, 2020	0.24
The gang argues about which type of candy is the best, so they bring their sweets to life so they can battle each other for dominance.
102	22	"The Unikingdom Awards"	Brock Gallagher	Bryan Condon	August 26, 2020	0.22
Unikitty throws an elaborate award show for everyone in the Unikingdom, including Master Frown and Brock, but tensions rise when Frown fails to win an award.
103	23	"The Birthday to End All Birthdays Part 1"	Neil Graf	Ed Skudder and Lynn Wang	August 27, 2020	0.21
Unikitty and her friends secretly orchestrate a series of fun birthday surprises for Master Frown, but their efforts don't bear the fruit that they anticipated.
104	24	"The Birthday to End All Birthdays Part 2"	Neil Graf	Ed Skudder and Lynn Wang	August 27, 2020	0.21
Following the events of Master Frown's birthday, Unikitty and the gang form a resistance group to restore peace in the Unikingdom.

== Production ==
The series was announced on May 10, 2017. At the 2017 San Diego Comic-Con, it was confirmed by co-showrunner and co-executive producer Ed Skudder that the series would premiere on Cartoon Network on January 1, 2018.

The second season of the series premiered on February 4, 2019, while the third and final season premiered on December 24, 2019. The series ended on August 27, 2020 after three seasons and a total of 104 episodes, with the two-part series finale "The Birthday to End All Birthdays".

=== Cancellation ===
By the time the series ended, Warner Bros. had terminated their film rights with The Lego Group, with Universal Pictures signing a deal as the distributor for future Lego films, though Warner Bros. retained the rights to the back catalogue of films and series. However, the episode "Sick Day", was left unaired in the United States due to being unintentionally similar to the COVID-19 pandemic, but it aired in other territories.

== Broadcast ==
=== Release ===
The series was released on Cartoon Network on October 27, 2017, after The Lego Ninjago Movie was released in theatres on September 22, 2017. It was also released internationally in the United Kingdom and Ireland on March 5, and on Teletoon in Canada on March 17, 2018. It premiered on Cartoon Network channels in Southeast Asia on March 30, in Sub-Saharan Africa on April 9 and in Australia and New Zealand on April 27, 2018. It premiered on France 4 in France on September 3, 2018. In Germany, Cartoon Network aired the series in 2018. Similarly to the US, the episode "Sick Day" was omitted from airing.

=== Home media ===
The first DVD set of the series was released on August 28, 2018, subtitled "Sparkle Party Season 1, Part 1".

The entire first season was released on DVD on May 7, 2019.

Season		Title	Episodes	Time length (minutes)	Release date	
Season		Title	Episodes	Time length (minutes)	Region 1	Region 2
1	2017–19	Volume 1: Sparkle Party	20 ("Spoooooky Game" – "Too Many Unikitties" • "Unikitty News")	220	August 28, 2018	November 11, 2019
1	2017–19	The Complete First Season	40	440	May 7, 2019	—N/a

== Sets ==
=== 2018 sets ===
The first and only sets released in the United States in August 2018, including promotional sets.

Set No.	Set	Release	Pieces	Figures	Ref.
30406	Unikitty Roller Coaster Wagon	2018	46	Unikitty	
40314	Dr. Fox Magnifying Machine	2018	76	-	
41451	Unikitty Cloud Car	2018	126	Fee Bee, Square Bear, Unikitty	
41452	Prince Puppycorn Trike	2018	101	Dino Dude, Kick Flip, Puppycorn	
41453	Party Time	2018	214	Hawkodile, Master Frown, Puppycorn, Unikitty	
41454	Dr. Fox Laboratory	2018	359	Dr. Fox, Puppycorn, Richard, Unikitty	
41455	Unikingdom Creative Brick Box	2018	620	Beatsy, Beau, Brock, Burger Person, Buzz, Cloud Berry, Dino Dude, Fee Bee, Kick Flip, Master Frown, Penny, Puppycorn, Richard, Square Bear, Sssnake, Stocko, Unikitty	
41456	Unikingdom Fairground Fun	2018	515	Brock, Dr. Fox, Master Frown, Puppycorn, Richard, Unikitty	

=== Unikitty! Blind Bags Series 1 ===
There are 12 completed blind bag sets.

Set No.	Set	Release	Pieces	Figures	Ref.
41775-1	Rainbow Unikitty	2018	14	Unikitty	
41775-2	Angry Unikitty	2018	14	Unikitty	
41775-3	Shades Puppycorn	2018	14	Puppycorn	
41775-4	Dinosaur Unikitty	2018	14	Unikitty	
41775-5	Shades Unikitty	2018	14	Unikitty	
41775-6	Dalmatian Puppycorn	2018	14	Puppycorn	
41775-7	Dessert Unikitty	2018	14	Unikitty	
41775-8	Camouflage Unikitty	2018	14	Unikitty	
41775-9	Alien Puppycorn	2018	14	Puppycorn	
41775-10	Sleepy Unikitty	2018	14	Unikitty	
41775-11	Queasy Unikitty	2018	14	Unikitty	
41775-12	Dessert Puppycorn	2018	14	Puppycorn	

== Reception ==
=== Critical reception ===
Luke Y. Thompson from the review aggregator website Rotten Tomatoes wrote that "If you didn't like the character, this may not be for you, but also, you may have no soul."

A favorable review of the series came from Emily Ashby from Common Sense Media where she notes Unikitty's motivations can inspire good, her friends yield in teamwork and are willing to accept reality whenever everything doesn't go as planned.

Upon the release of the "Sparkle Party" DVD, Luke Y. Thompson from Forbes gave a positive review of Unikitty!, stating that the series "has humor for everyone", although its "occasional dark bit of subtext" could go against the taste of some parents for their children.

=== Accolades ===
Year	Award	Category	Nominee	Result	Ref.
2019	Annie Awards	Outstanding Achievement for Voice Acting in an Animated Television/Broadcast Production	Tara Strong	Nominated	

== See also ==
- The Lego Movie (franchise)
- The Lego Movie
- The Lego Movie 2: The Second Part
- The Lego Movie (Lego theme)
- Lego Unikitty!
- The Lego Movie Videogame
- The Lego Movie 2 Videogame
- Lego Dimensions
