= Thomas A. Furness III =

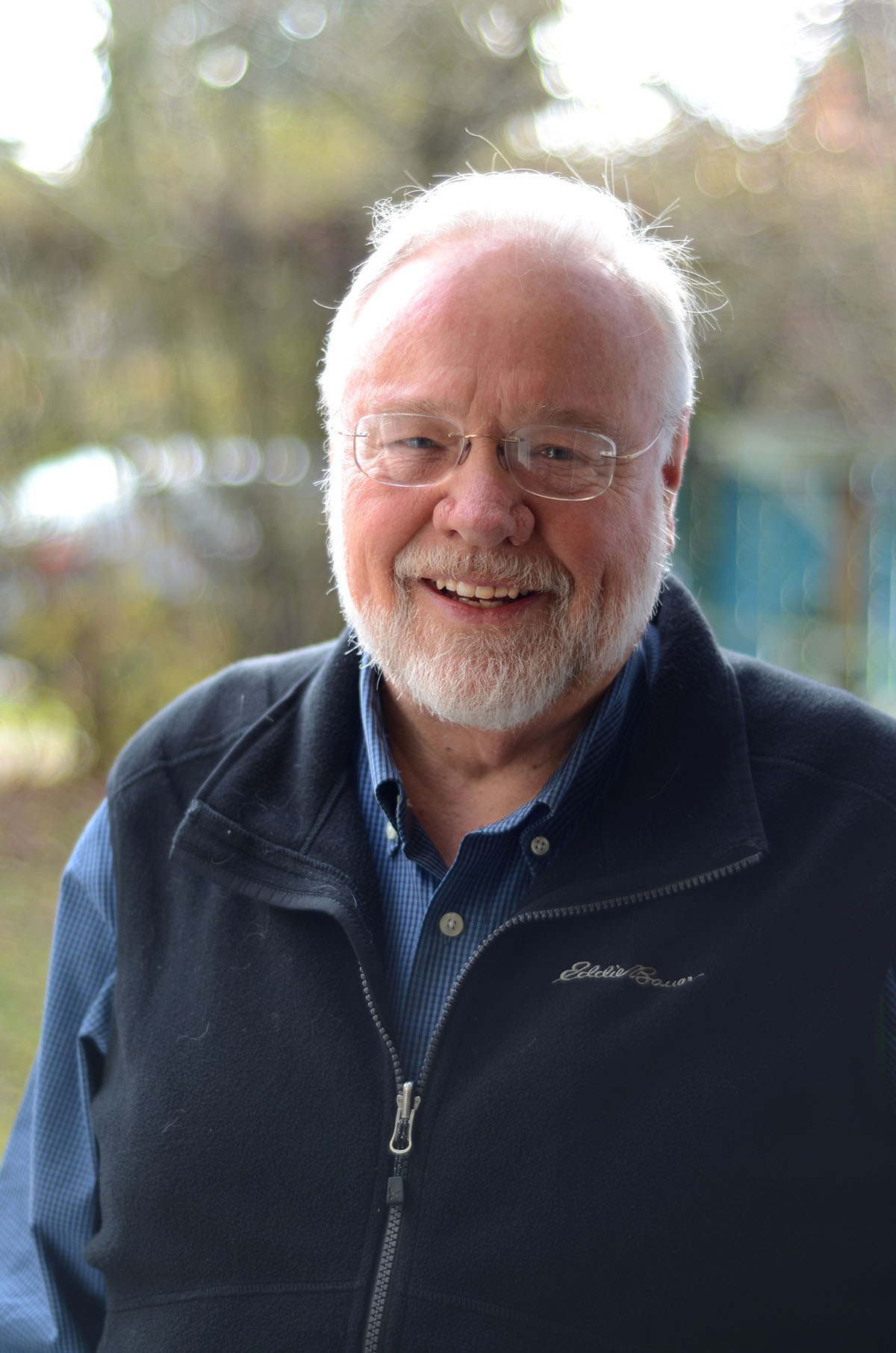
- Born: April 19, 1943 (age 82); Canton, North Carolina
- Occupations: Inventor, Professor, and Virtual Reality Pioneer
- Spouse: Linda P. Furness (married 1965-present)
- Children: 2

Thomas A. Furness III is an American inventor, professor, and virtual reality pioneer based in Seattle, Washington. He is a Professor in the University of Washington Department of Industrial & Systems Engineering, and the founder of the Human Interface Technology Lab at the University of Washington and its sister labs at the University of Canterbury (HIT Lab NZ) and University of Tasmania. Known for his contributions in developing human interface technology, he has earned the title, "Grandfather of Virtual Reality."

Furness recently received the first-ever lifetime achievement award for his 50 years service in the field of virtual reality and augmented reality from the Augmented World Expo in Santa Clara, California. In 2018, Furness was elected a fellow of the Institute of Electrical and Electronics Engineers.

In addition to being a professor at the University of Washington, he is also the general manager and owner of the RATLab (Rocking and Thinking Laboratory), an engineering research and development company.

== Early life ==
Born in Canton, North Carolina, on April 19, 1943, to Margaret Nash Furness and Thomas A. Furness Jr., Furness was the older of two boys. At a young age, Furness was driven, brilliant, and curious about technology. He spent much of his childhood disassembling and building electronics in a lab he built in the basement of his parents’ home. He won the state science fair as a teen, and graduated from Enka High School in 1961. Upon graduation, Furness went on to attend Duke University, where he received his Bachelor of Science in electrical engineering.

== Career ==
He was commissioned in the Air Force and sent to Wright-Patterson Air Force Base in Dayton, Ohio, from September 1966 to 1989. During this time, he developed advanced cockpits for fighter aircraft. It was also during this time that Furness completed his PhD at the University of Southampton in England (1977–79). Furness arrived at the University of Washington in the fall of 1989 and founded the Human Interface Technology Lab (HITLab).

== Personal life ==
In 1965, Furness married his high school sweetheart Linda Pearce, and the two had 2 daughters and 6 grandchildren.
