= ARTag =

Fiducial marker system

Comparison of augmented reality fiducial markers for computer vision

An ARTag is a fiducial marker system to support 3D registration (alignment) and pose tracking in augmented reality. They can be used to facilitate the appearance of virtual objects, games, and animations within the real world. Like the earlier ARToolKit system, they allow for video tracking capabilities that calculate a camera's position and orientation relative to physical markers in real time. Once the camera's position is known, a virtual camera can be positioned at the same point, revealing the virtual object at the location of the ARTag. It thus addresses two of the key problems in Augmented Reality: viewpoint tracking and virtual object interaction.

An ARTag appears on the Mars Science Laboratory. A similar technique is being used by NASA's Spacecraft 3D smartphone app as an educational outreach tool.

ARTag is supported by the open source Goblin XNA software.

== See also ==
- Augmented reality
- ARToolKit
