= Lego minifigure =

Plastic figurines manufactured by the Lego Group

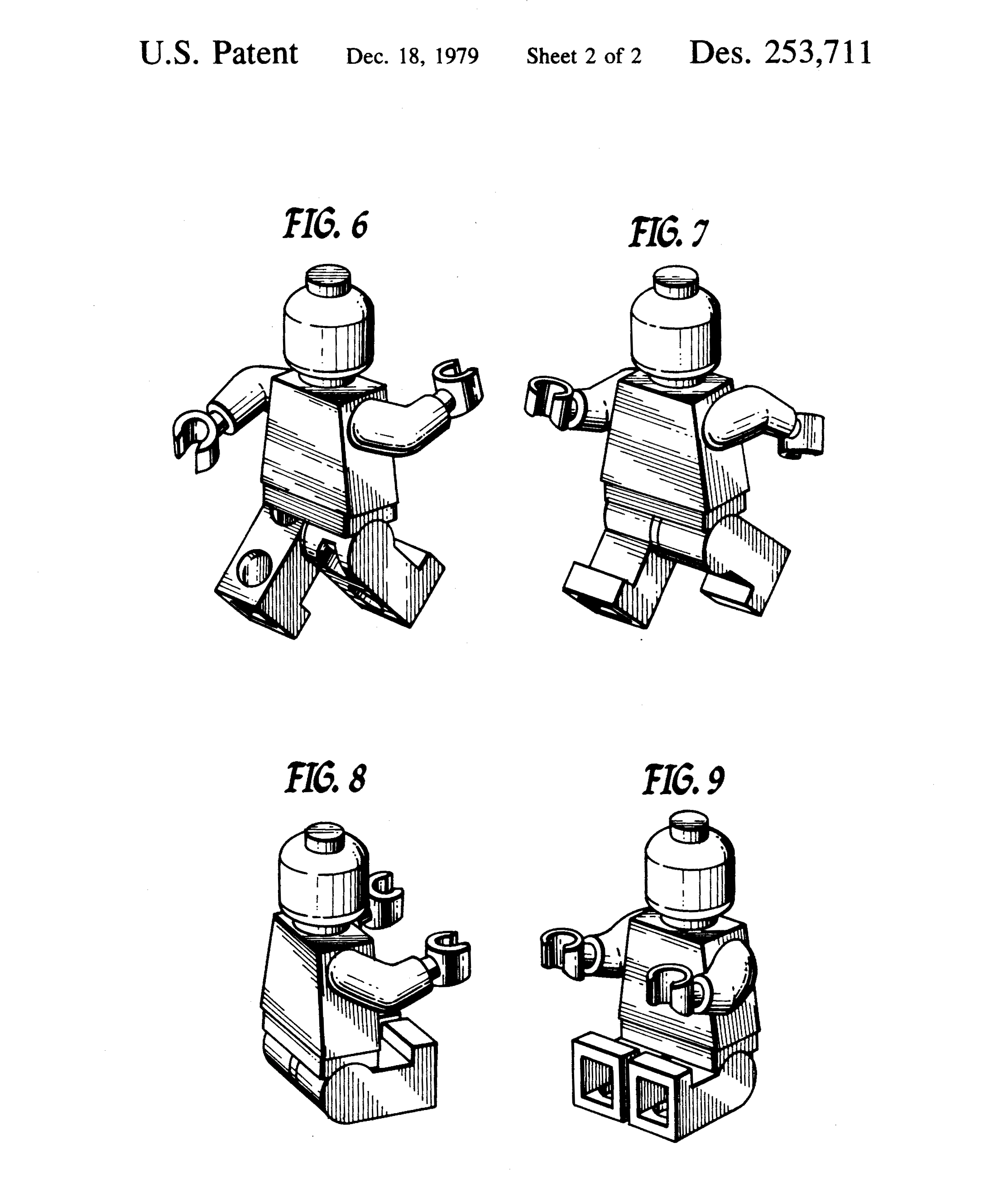
- Patent for Lego minifigures
- Type: Construction toy accessory
- Company: Lego
- Country: Denmark
- Availability: 1978–present
- Materials: Plastic

A Lego minifigure, often simply referred to as a Lego figure or a minifig, is a small plastic articulated figurine made of special Lego bricks produced by Danish building toy manufacturer The Lego Group. They were first produced in 1978 and have been a success, with over 4 billion produced worldwide as of 2020. Minifigures are usually found within Lego sets, although they are also sold separately as collectables in blind bags (e.g. under the Lego theme of the same name), or can be custom-built on lego.com and in Lego Stores. While some are named as specific characters, either licensed from already existing franchises or of Lego's own creation, many are unnamed and are designed simply to fit within a certain theme (such as police officers, astronauts and pirates). They are highly customizable, and parts from different figures can be mixed and matched, resulting in many combinations.

There are also other types of figures from Lego sets, such as animals, Duplo figures or mini-doll figures. The Lego minifigure is, together with the Lego brick, the company's mascot and one of the most popular toys of all time. Minifigures are collected by both children and adults.

Similar figures, often called "Lego compatible minifigures", are also produced by various other companies (often as clones/knock-offs), such as Kre-O (called Kreons), Lepin, Cobi, Block Tech, or Mega Bloks.

== History ==
Early Lego minifigures without moving arms and legs

A precursor to the minifigure was released in 1975. These were at the same scale as the current minifigures, but had a different design. They had solid torsos without separate movable arms, solid lower body pieces that were not moveable, and heads without printed features. They had only three types of headpieces, caps, pigtail hair, and cowboy hats, which came in various colors, originally black, yellow and blue.

The first modern minifigures were released in 1978, included in Castle, Space, and Town sets. These were designed by Jens Nygaard Knudsen, who had come up with the idea for having the torsos, legs, and arm pieces interchangeable. As these were made into pieces, the company decided to give them a simple facial expression, rendered as two solid black dots for eyes and a smile painted in solid black, and without any gender or racial components, believing that these factors would be "determined by the child's imagination and play". The arms incorporated clips as "hands" which allowed figures to hold a wide range of different utensils and tools.

In 1989 for the launch of Pirates theme, some minifigures also included hooks for hands, as well as peg legs; this was the first departure from the traditional body parts. Starting with Lego Pirates in 1989 and spreading to Lego Town and Lego Castle in the next few years, minifigures were also produced with different facial expressions such as facial hair, eye patches, feminine makeup, and sunglasses. Most of these early facial additions were still centered around the two eyes and smile, however starting in 1997 with Willa the Witch of the Fright Knights facial expressions became more complex including open mouths and detailed eyes.

Another departure from traditional parts was the use of spring-loaded legs. These legs are joined at the top. These legs were only featured in basketball sets, 2002–2003. Other leg variations include short legs for children or dwarfs, or long legs (used in the Toy Story and Avatar themes).

In 2003, the first minifigures with naturalistic skin tones (as opposed to the yellow used until this point) were released, as part of the Lego Basketball theme; these minifigures were also created in the likeness of living people (additionally this also included Lando Calrissian in the Star Wars theme). In April 2004, the Harry Potter theme began to use natural skin tones, and Lego Star Wars followed in June, and by 2005 the use of natural skin tones was expanded to all licensed products; in which figures were created to represent film actors and other living people. Popular examples between 2005 and 2008 include Star Wars, Marvel, Batman, The Lord of the Rings and Indiana Jones minifigures.

By 2006, Lego had reportedly produced 4 billion minifigures. There are at least 3,655 different minifigures produced between 1975 and 2010 and the number of new minifigures per year is increasing rapidly. In 2010 more than 300 new minifigures were introduced. Some minifigures repeatedly appear across multiple Lego sets, while others can be rare, often vastly increasing their resale value. In 2019, the number of Lego Star Wars minifigures has surpassed 1000, with the Battlefront II protagonist Iden Versio (bearing code sw1000).

== Design and construction ==
The height of a typical minifigure is 4 centimetres (1.6 in). Minifigures generally feature six parts (widely referred to as tools in the toy industry): head, torso, hips, arms, hands, and legs; these six parts allow seven points of articulation: swivel head, swivel arms, swivel wrists, and swivel legs. Minifigures are usually packaged as three separate parts in Lego sets: head, torso and legs. The plastic is acrylonitrile butadiene styrene (ABS), a tough material that makes LEGO figures durable.

The plastic is melted into specially designed molds that produce the different parts of the minifigure. Some of the molds are also accessories such as weapons (swords, guns, lightsabers, etc.) or everyday accessories (cups, food, tools, etc.). Heads and torsos nearly always need further decoration, and sometimes the arms and legs as well. This difficult process is why the figures are more expensive than any other Lego products. After being printed, the head is placed on the torso, the legs attached, and the arms are snapped on. The figures are finally bagged and readied for sale.

First US patent release of LEGO figures by Interlego AG
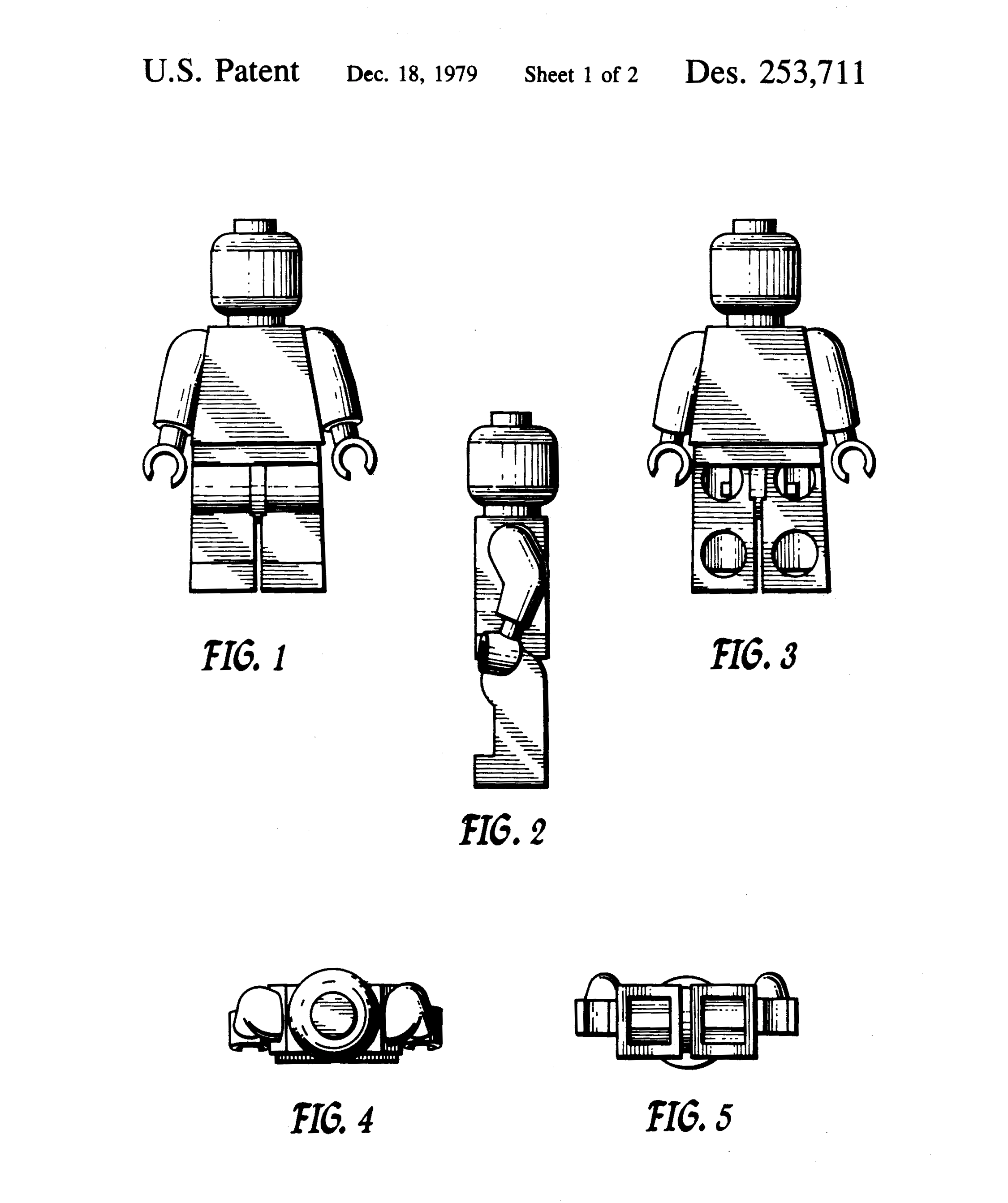

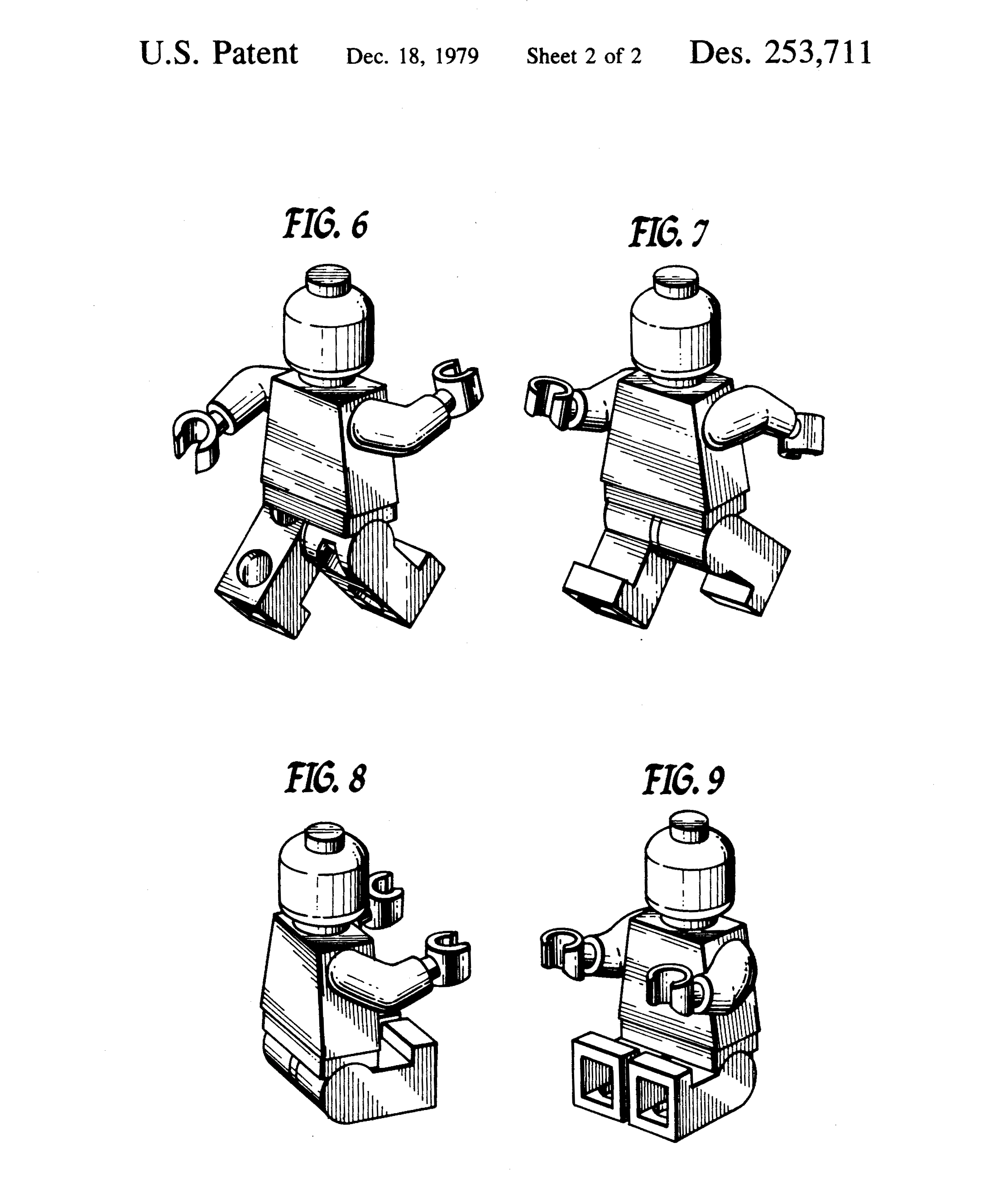

== Use ==
A Lego Minifigures hiker from Series 16 released in 2016

Minifigure heads are cylindrical, and attach to a long, narrow cylinder molded onto the top of the torso, which allows the head to rotate. This feature also allows items to be attached to the figures over the torso, such as air tanks, jet packs, paper or fabric capes, breastplates or beards. The heads have a stud on top which is the same size as studs on standard Lego bricks which could allow one to be placed on it. The head is the only component of the minifigure which can be used for other applications - blank minifigure heads have often been used in Lego sets to replicate other objects such as lampshades and electrical appliances.

Head accessories vary widely, and include hair, helmets and hats. The legs rotate independently to 90 degrees forward, and nearly 45 degrees backward. Minifigures also connect to standard Lego bricks in both a sitting or standing position. The hands of a minifigure resemble the letter C, which allows them to hold many Lego accessories as well as bricks, tiles, and plates. There are hundreds of a vast variety of accessories, including swords, axes, wands, cups, guns, blasters and lightsabers. Additionally, the tops of the hands are the same size as the studs on most Lego bricks, which allows them to be connected. These variations allow minifigures to be customized, keeping with the modular design of Lego elements.

Additionally, many Lego fans utilize these pieces to create MOC's of their favourite things such as their own Death Star's and more. To create these, they use creative techniques with pieces like Lego hands to create a sphere.

== Design variations ==
While nearly all minifigure heads, torsos, arms, hands and legs are the same size and shape, some sets have included figures that deviate from the standard.

=== Torso ===
Lego torsos often have black or white squares on the neck joint, this is to help with the automatic printing process when producing minifigures.

Minifigures built from special, uniquely molded pieces were first introduced in "Life on Mars". Martians are composed of five tools: two pairs of double arms, a mechanical torso, a conjoined leg piece, and a head. This configuration is also used for many Star Wars droids; standard battle droids follow the same pattern, while super battle droids feature a head fixed to a torso, General Grievous has space for four arms, and IG-88 has a head constructed of other Lego pieces. R2-D2 and other astromech droids are constructed from unique parts, with a separate top, body and legs. The robots of Exo-Force, Mars Mission commander aliens and Bionicle miniatures have a design similar to the Star Wars battle droids, but with separate legs, movable hands, and a head affixed to a small torso. Hagrid, the half-giant character from the Harry Potter series uses a larger minifigure body, with only the head being separable.

Skeletons use the standard minifigure head, but unique torsos, arms, and legs designed to resemble a skeletal structure; although different, these figure parts are still detachable. Skeleton figures and others alike stir up controversy on whether they should be considered a minifigure or just a "figure", due to the lack of standard minifigure parts. Additionally, some minifigures, mostly pirates, sometimes include peg legs and hook hands.

=== Legs ===
Shorter legs, without joints at the hip, are sometimes used to create minifigures which are shorter in stature than standard figures (i.e. children, dwarfs, gnomes, goblins, Ewoks and other small characters like Yoda or The Penguin). Such pieces were first created for Star Wars sets but have since been used elsewhere. In 2018, a medium-sized pair of legs was introduced, sized between the shorter legs and regular legs. These legs had a joint at the hip to allow individual movement of the legs, and were used to represent younger teenagers, introduced for the rebooted Harry Potter theme.

Some minifigures, particularly in Castle and Pirate sets, use large sloped bricks instead of legs, to resemble dresses or skirts. However, these sloped bricks are taller than standard minifigure legs. In 2018, a special skirt piece was released, shorter, more softly curved on the back, and with regular leg pins to connect to the torso, instead of the studs on ordinary bricks.

Skirts have also been produced, either as new molds, or as separate parts made in fabric. The first skirt mold appeared for the Minnie Mouse and Alice minifigures within the Disney Collectible Minifigures theme. Fabric skirts have appeared in Harry Potter and The Simpsons.

Other legs include smoke legs, mermaid tail legs, snake tail legs and octopus legs.

=== Head ===
Minifigures have also featured unique head sculpts that differ from the traditional cylindrical shape; the first was Jar Jar Binks, included in a Star Wars set in 1999. Since then, various other minifigures like Yoda, C-3PO, Harry Potter goblin figures, tuskens, geonosians, Zeb Orrelios, Kit Fisto, Plo Koon, Davy Jones and Bossk also use non standard heads. Kit Fisto was the first minifigure to not use an acrylonitrile butadiene styrene head, using rubber instead. Traditional accessories, such as hairpieces, hats and helmets, cannot be placed on these non-standard heads. Some minifigures, such as wookiees, gamorrean guards and ewoks use, instead of a normal head, a special piece, consisting of head and chest, which fits over the body. Pong Krell uses a similar piece consisting of a head, chest and two additional arms. The SpongeBob SquarePants minifigure has a sculpted Lego brick head that fits like a standard head, covering the whole torso similar to the ghost figures, except that these figures use short or standard legs instead of a brick.

=== Head and neck-wear ===
An enormous variety of clothing and accessories has been produced for minifigures, including hairstyles, caps, hats, and helmets. In Star Wars sets, troopers have uniquely sculpted helmets, adapting the original character designs to the minifigure format. Some minifigures, like Balin from The Hobbit, have a hair piece that exends as a beard to the chest, Exo-Force minifigures feature anime-style hair, as does the Nightwing minifigure from the Batman Arkham Asylum set. Old Boba Fett and Jango Fett minifigures had helmet pieces which back half stretched down to the minifigures' back in the form of a jet pack.

Classic ghost figures have a full-body cape which attaches to the head of the minifigure, and solid bricks as legs.

=== Others ===
The minifigure for the Lord of the Rings character Gollum consists only of three pieces: a single piece forms the body, consisting of the torso, head, and legs, in a crawling position, with two arms specially made for the minifigure. Some other minifigures, like the Phantom Menace character Sebulba, are one single molded piece.

=== Material ===
Lego released multiple minifigures made of metal instead of plastic. 10 000 gold-colored chrome minifigures of the Star Wars character C-3PO (4521221) were released in random Lego Star Wars sets in 2007. The most extreme design variations were an edition of five minifigures of C-3PO, released in 2008, and two minifigures of the character Boba Fett, released in 2010, cast in solid 14-karat gold with a figure estimated to cost between $10,000 and $15,000. NASA's Juno spacecraft which entered orbit around the planet Jupiter in 2016 carries three specially commissioned minifigures on board. Cast from space-grade aluminum, the minifigures represent the astronomer Galileo, the Roman deity Jupiter and his wife Juno. This also set the record for the furthest distance travelled by a Lego minifigure.

=== As part of other objects ===
Various minifigures from multiple themes have been released as keychains. The pieces of these figures are inseparable and a metal chain and keychain ring are attached to their heads. Various minifigures were also released as a part of pens in the Lego Writing theme.

== Variations ==
In some Lego products, figures other than standard minifigures are used. A catalog that shows all these Lego figures is available.

=== Animal figures ===
Lego also features a variety of similar figures for non-anthropomorphic animals, including domestic, barnyard and wild animals, dinosaurs, and mythological and fictional creatures.

=== Bigfigures ===
Bigfigures are Lego figurines that are taller and more muscular then regular minifigures which were introduced in 2008. Though most share the same body shape and pose, there have been a few variations, such as Jabba the Hutt from Star Wars, or the wampa and the rancor which are even bigger in size. Most bigfigures don't contain removable heads, though there have been recent exceptions, such as Thanos. A precursor to the bigfigure was released in 1999 under the Rock Raiders theme.

=== Mini-dolls ===
The Friends theme, released in 2012, included mini-doll figures, a more doll-like construction with more realistic anatomy, soon introduced into other themes chiefly aimed at girls. Even though the mini-dolls in the Lego Friends theme have more realistic anatomy, the mini-dolls' legs can only move ninety degrees into a sitting position. The mini-dolls' legs are also molded together and can not move separately as the traditional Lego minifigure legs can. The mini-doll in the Lego Friends theme is slightly taller than the traditional minifigure. Since their introduction in the Friends theme, mini-dolls have also been featured in other themes, also primarily aimed at girls.

=== Non-disassemblable figures ===
Lego Duplo includes figures that have less articulation than standard minifigures and cannot be disassembled for safety reasons. Likewise, the Fabuland collection, produced in the 1980s, consisted of larger anthropomorphized animal characters, which also could not be easily disassembled. Belville and Scala, Lego products marketed to girls, also include larger scale figures. These figures are similar to Technic figures in articulation, but feature less angular body sculpts. Scala figures more closely resemble dolls, in that clothes are separate from the figures and hair is made of strands rather than molded plastic. The Baby line included figures that could not move at all and had the size a bit bigger than the Duplo figures.

=== Figures built entirely from standard bricks ===
Creator sets also often feature animals built entirely of more classic Lego bricks. Some droids from Star Wars and various animals and other creatures appearing in themes like Harry Potter or The Lord of the Rings like dragons are entirely brick-built. Some of these figures are still considered "minifigures". At the Legoland parks, the standardized Miniland design has long been used as a template for brick-built figures, and has occasionally appeared in sets.

=== Nanofigures ===
Lego Nanofigures are miniature versions of original minifigures, following the same general shape, but without any moving parts, roughly the same height as a regular minifigure's legs. From 2010, they were initially produced in metal colors to represent trophies and statuettes, but from 2011 onwards they got printing to represent characters in sets produced in micro-scale, too small for regular minifigures, or to represent diminutive characters such as Ant-Man. They are also available in smaller scale sets such as 71043 "Hogwarts Castle".

=== Microfigures ===
Within the Lego Games theme, the Lego microfigures were released. For that name, they are about half the size of the regular Lego minifigure. The microfigures have a fixed head, small, non-movable legs which somewhat resemble normal minifigure legs, and a hint of shoulders for arms.

=== Baby figure ===
In 2016, a new mold for a minifigure-style human baby was introduced. Although similar to a microfigure in body shape, it has a detachable head and actual molded arms (albeit, non-posable). It has mainly made appearances in LEGO City sets, such as the "Fun at the Park" set. It was also notable for appearing as an accessory for the Babysitter in the 16th series of Lego Minifigures, and LEGO "10255 Assembly Square", which is the 2017 Lego Modular Building. In Star Wars: The Mandalorian sets the Grogu figure also uses this body mold.

=== Technic ===
Technic used larger scale action figures between 1986 and 2001. These figures featured more realistic sculpts, although still distinctively angular, and featured more articulation, including bendable elbows and knees. These figures are further distinguished from minifigures in that they cannot be easily disassembled; even the hair pieces are non-removable.

=== Bionicle and similar ===
In 2001, Lego further expanded the minifigure system, with the introduction of Bionicle figures. These figures are a part of a fictional story developed by Lego and resemble biomechanical creatures. Initially, these figures were produced without articulation, only able to hold tools and weapons.

Bionicle later got replaced with Hero Factory in 2010. In 2005, Lego released Bionicle playsets, with minifigure variations of characters that had previously been produced in the larger Bionicle scale, notably the Toa and Visorak characters. While these minifigures did not feature movable parts, Lego released Piraka and Inika playsets in 2006, which included minifigures with movable parts.

=== SMART Minifigures ===
In early 2026, the Lego Group introduced the first electronic "SMART Minifigures" as part of its SMART Play system which will make their first debut in Lego Star Wars sets that year. Together with a wirelessly charged SMART Brick, the SMART Minifigures can interact with special Lego pieces called SMART Tags to create dynamic sounds and other effects.

=== Light up light-sabers ===
Other variations of the standard minifigure produced for Star Wars sets included the light-up light-saber (L.U.L.S.) minifigures. These figures were released as a part of the more expensive Star Wars Episode III sets in 2005. These figures look like standard minifigures, but to facilitate internal electronics, their parts cannot be removed; the only exception to this is the headgear, the left hand and arm, and each of the legs from the hips. When the head is pressed down, an LED illuminates the light-saber blade. These figures rely on battery power for their special feature. The batteries last three hours and are not intended to be replaced, although replacement is possible.

Many fans, especially children, were amenable to this innovation. Others however, particularly adult collectors, found these figures contentious, considering them an unwelcome gimmick. The heads spun around loosely, and the right arm had a limited range of motion, which made posing difficult. The head could not be separated from the body, which made replacing the cape (which frayed or ripped often) impossible. The fact that in two cases unique characters were produced solely as L.U.L. minifigs, with no standard version available to collectors, was also an unpopular decision. Following the initial release of these figures Lego announced no more were to be produced, due to their unpopularity and more expensive production. One set, the "7261 Clone Turbo Tank", which featured an L.U.L. version of Mace Windu, was reissued with a standard version of the minifig and an extra Clone Trooper figure to make up the cost of the set.

There was also at least one high end City themed set ("Police HQ") that included a police officer with a light up 'torch'. Another L.U.L.S. minfig in police uniform appeared without the 'saber' part of the light saber and a yellow LED in the 'handle' of the light saber, reusing the L.U.L.S. design outside the Star Wars setting as an effective 'torch'. He appeared in a high end City set based on a standard and well selling City "Police HQ" design. A complaint about the set was that the L.U.L.S. minifig was contained in a 'try me' compartment of the box allowing customers (and excited children) to wear down his battery while he was still on the shelf. The set was discontinued after a year with a separate identical design but with three extra normal minifgs replacing the L.U.L.S. minfig.

=== Others ===
Certain Lego sets released between 1974 and 1982 included much larger figures; the heads and hair were special pieces and the torso was a modified brick which connected to flexible hinge-like arm tubes and a towball hand brick with a stud. They are known as Homemaker figures (after the theme where they occurred) or maxifigures, a later term coined in analogy with the minifigure. This is the reason why the usual figures are "mini". Objects, like alarm clocks, in the form of minifigures have also been released.

== Customisation ==
Minifigure customisation is the practice of modifying Lego minifigures. This can be as simple as mixing and matching parts, or as complex as painting or remolding plastic. Some custom minifigures are made by affixing stickers or decals to the figures. There are also third party businesses which sell custom decals and molded minifigure accessories, many of which are inspired by popular media. While a relatively recent phenomenon, minifigure customisation has rapidly become popular within the wider building community, although some maintain a "purist" approach and use only elements produced by Lego.

Lego Group executives have used personalised minifigures in place of business cards, with names, email addresses, and telephone numbers printed on the torso and hair and facial features designed to resemble each person. It is believed that over 100 of these minifigures exist.

== Collecting ==
Both children and adult fans of Lego collect Lego Minifigures without collecting the sets. The Lego group produced 2.3 billion Minifigures between 1978 and 1998 and many people buy and sell these on eBay and other sites such as BrickLink.

== Depictions in other media ==
=== Brickfilms ===
Various stop motion animated films and television series are made using Lego minifigures.

==== Official Lego media ====
The Lego Group produced various short films, feature films and video games featuring Lego minifigures and bricks. Most of these are based on other already existing franchises like Star Wars or DC Comics. These films are created using primarily computer generated animation, they are styled in such a way as to emulate the look of stop-motion brickfilms, even being influenced by some popular brickfilms. Multiple video games also feature Lego minifigures and bricks.

The minifigures featured in them have additional articulation and mobility, as well as textural modifications to create a realistic effect. Often these media feature a vast population of minifigures living in a vast Lego universe setting and rely heavily on meta humor about this fact.

=== Other famous depictions ===
- In January 2012, a Lego minifigure carrying a Canadian flag was sent up to the stratosphere and garnered worldwide attention.
- The Adult Swim series Robot Chicken, Lego minifigures were used in various Lego skits of the show.
- Lego minifigures were featured in Pixar's Toy Story 3 and the Toy Story Toons short Hawaiian Vacation.
- The 2014 episode of The Simpsons, "Brick Like Me", featuring Lego minifigure versions of the characters in a Lego version of Springfield.

== Collectible Minifigures ==
The Collectible Minifigures (later renamed to Lego Minifigures) theme, introduced on 5 March 2010, is a set of individually packaged "blind bag" minifigures. Each series consists of approximately 16 new and exclusive minifigures, with a random assortment of 60 polybags per box. A new series is released every three to four months, with some having a theme (e.g. monsters or masquerade) and others including a wide variety of minifigs. Several blogs publish "feel guides" to help collectors figure out which minifigures are inside the opaque package. The minifigures can be based on fictional archetypes, history, or jobs, sports, life styles and hobbies (i.e. Punk Rocker, Dino Tracker, Caveman). All CMF minifigures come with a Lego "stand". Most CMF come with an (often unique) accessory and many have uniquely printed body parts.

One minifigure released during Series 10, Mr. Gold, had only 5,000 copies produced. The minifigure has sold on markets for high sums of money.

Similar bags have also been released for DC, The Simpsons, Looney Tunes, Marvel, Harry Potter, Dungeons & Dragons, and more.

== See also ==
- Timeline of Lego
