= Mtron =

Mtron may refer to:

- Lego_Space#M:Tron_.281990.E2.80.931991.29
- Mtron (company), a former manufacturer of SSDs and other equipment
