= Lego Quatro =

Construction toy by Lego, 2004–2006

Quatro
- Other names: Lego Explore
- Availability: 2004–2006
- Total sets: 10

Lego Quatro is a discontinued product range of the Lego construction toy, designed for children aged 1 to 3 years old. Initially launched in 2004, the series was designed to be easier for younger children to handle compared to Lego Duplo. Lego Quatro got its name from the Italian word quattro for the number "four", as the bricks are four times the size of the regular bricks.

Lego Quatro bricks are four times the length, height and width of regular bricks and twice the length, height and width of Lego Duplo bricks (eight times the size in volume). The bricks are softer compared to Duplo as the bricks can be pressed in slightly. Despite their size, they are compatible with Duplo bricks which are in turn compatible with traditional Lego bricks. One Lego Quatro set included a minifigure, which was made from a single piece and was larger than a Duplo minifigure.

The Lego Quatro logo is a blue elephant. The elephant is the same elephant as the discontinued Lego Baby series but in another color.

The Quatro product line was discontinued in 2006, with a total of 10 sets produced. Some sets have become valuable for collectors, with the price of the set including a Quatro minifigure having jumped in value 18,996% as of 2025.

== See also ==
- Lego Baby
