= Lego Minifigures (theme) =

Lego theme introduced in 2010

Minifigures
- Subject: Collectible minifigures
- Availability: 5 March 2010–present
- Total sets: 775 minifigures (51 series)
- Characters: Various, including characters from sports, history, popular culture, and more.
- Official website

Lego Minifigures are a 2010 Lego theme based on a set of collectible Lego minifigures. Each figure is an original character with new clothing and facial designs, and many contain previously unseen accessories.

Each series usually contains 16 different minifigures; however, some series contain as few as 9 minifigures, while others contain up to 22. Since 2021, the number of different minifigures for a series is set to 12. In 2023, the Disney 100-anniversary series came out, bringing the total number of figures to 18, although it was once again reduced to 12 with the second Marvel series. This series also introduced paper boxes, instead of the plastic bags, making it no longer possible to feel up the pieces for each figure.

In celebration of the tenth series, the minifigure Mr. Gold had 5,000 copies produced. Mr. Gold has since sold for thousands on online markets.

== Overview ==
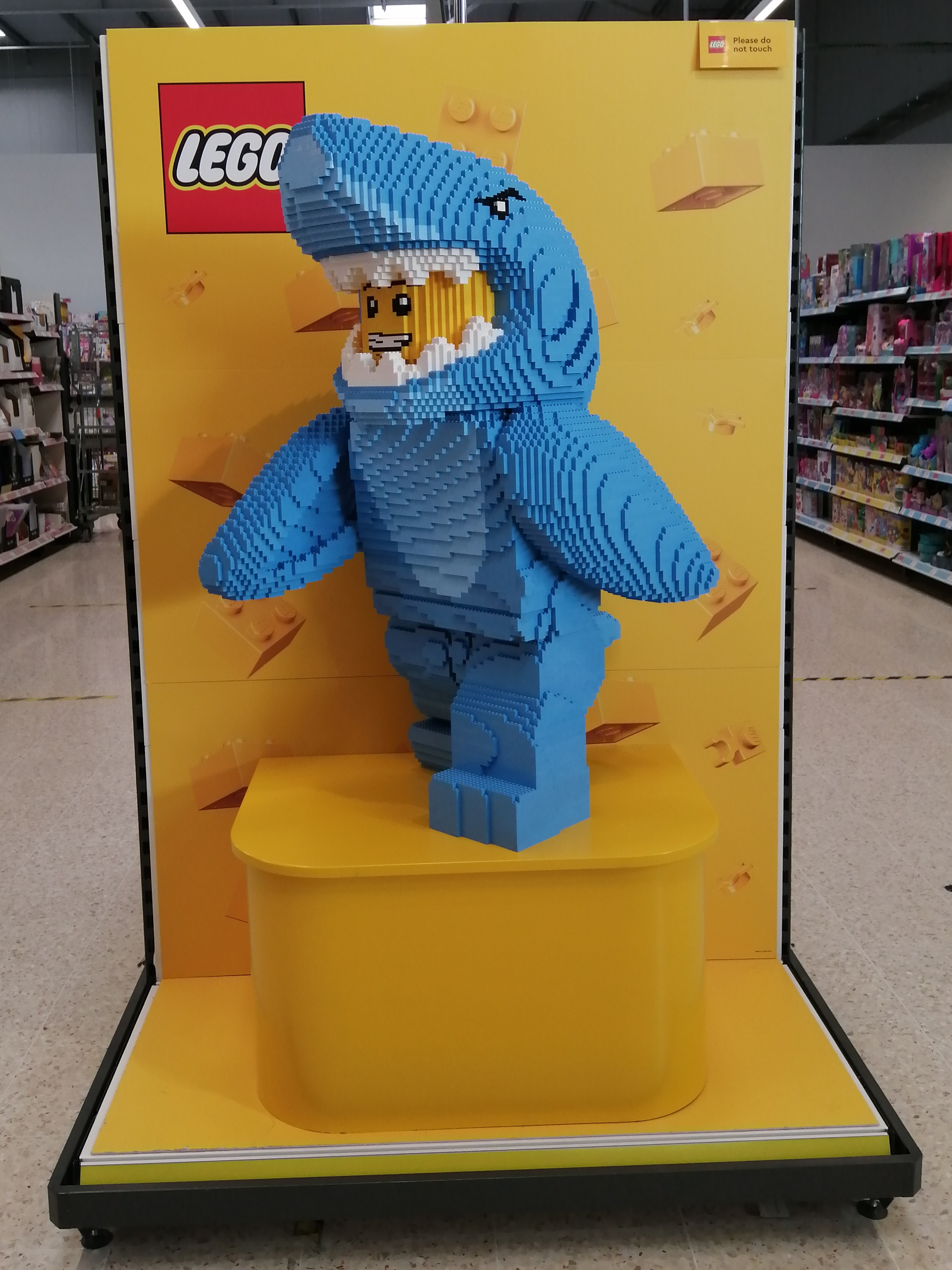
Lego Shark Suit Guy (series 15)

The series consists of a number of individually themed collectible Lego minifigures based on movies, sports, history, and popular culture. The figures are sold individually in sealed, unmarked packets, giving customers a random chance at obtaining any particular figurine. While considered a novel approach by some, it has raised controversy amongst enthusiasts and collectors, increasing the amount of difficulty in obtaining a complete collection. Purchases from many retailers make no guarantees regarding the contents of a particular packet. Despite attempts to obfuscate the contents of these packets, the bags of Series 1 and 2 have a second figurine-specific barcode on the rear of the packet, next to the EAN/UPC product barcode (which is unique to each series). This allowed customers to identify individual figures within the packet, significantly decreasing the amount of money and effort required to obtain a complete collection, and eliminating the possibility of unintentionally receiving duplicates. There were also apps for both iPhone and Android devices that utilized these barcodes.

Lego has eliminated the figurine-specific barcodes on all Series 3 and 4 packets and replaced them with a braille-like system of dots embossed in the lower seal of the bag. In theory, this will allow customers to continue identifying the figure enclosed within. Later series do not have any markings to indicate their contents.

On average, a new series has been released every four months. Release dates sometimes vary between countries.

In September 2021, Matthew Ashton, The Lego Group's Vice President of Design announced the Collectible Minifigures alongside City, Friends, Creator, Lego Classic, Technic, Speed Champions, Monkie Kid, Ninjago and DOTS (formerly) themes will continue until at least 2023.

== Development ==
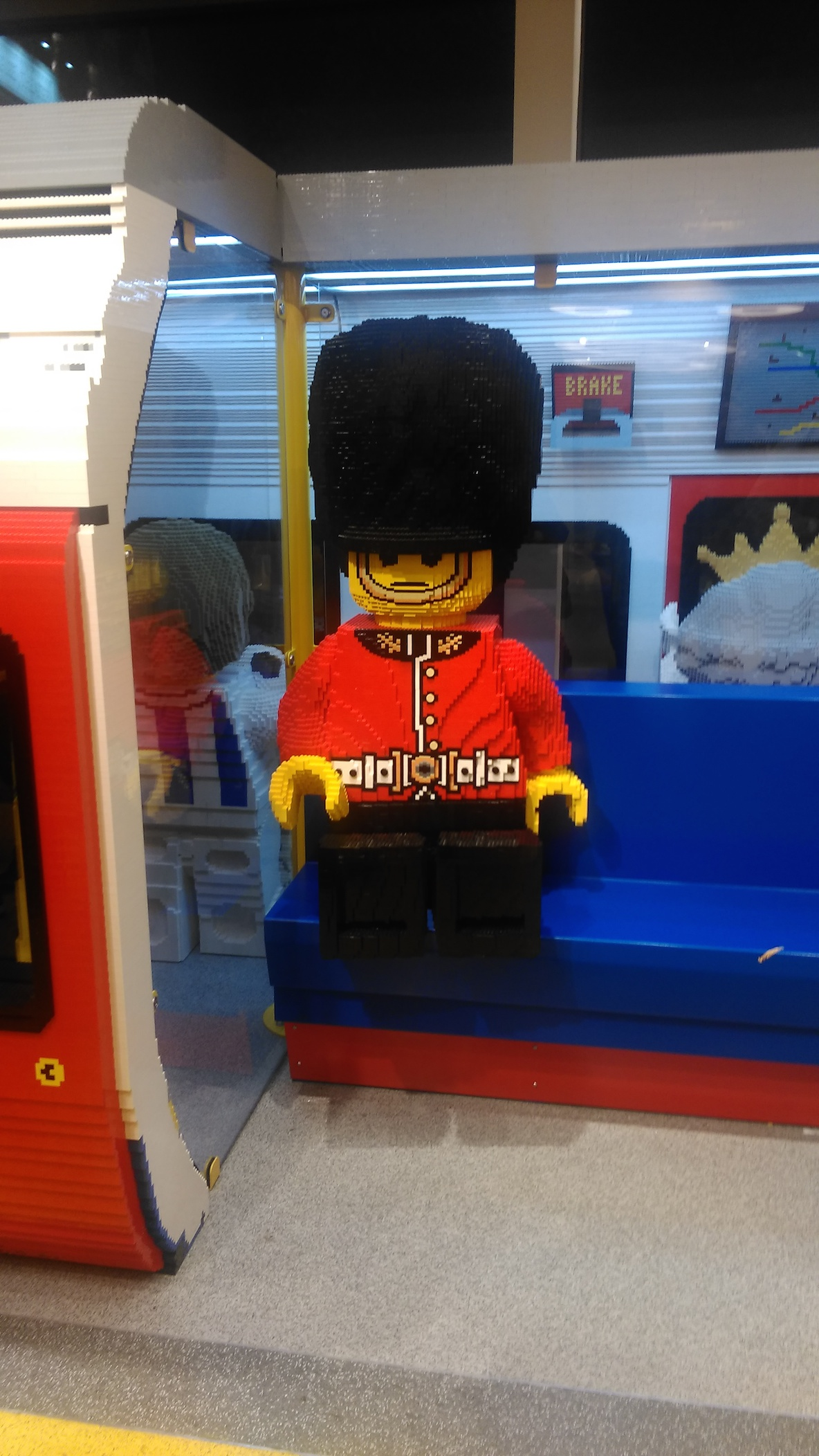
Royal Guard sculptor (Series 5)

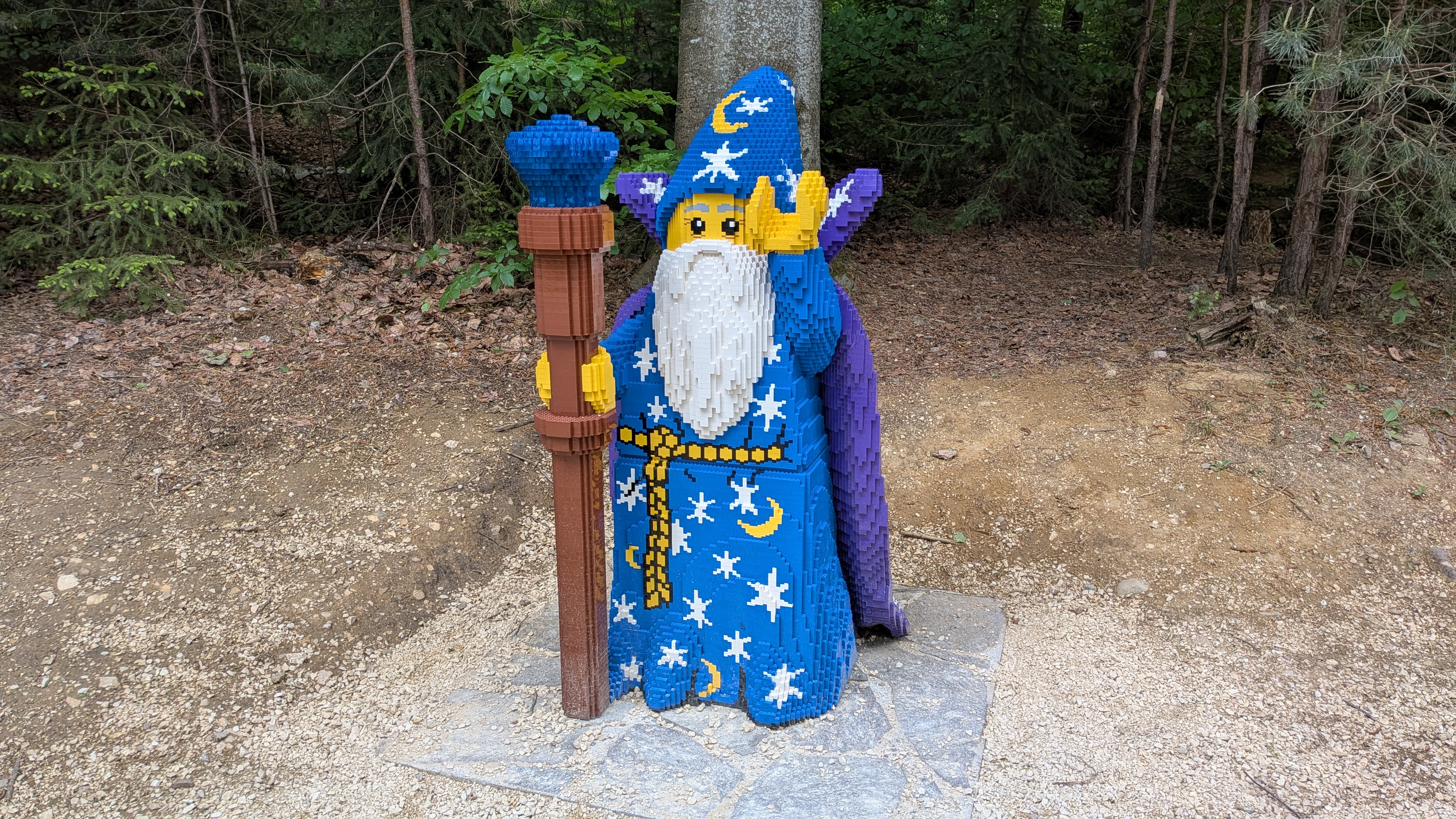
A sculpture of the Wizard minifigure (series 12)

During the development process of the Lego Minifigures theme, Lego designers Tara Wike explained the concept of the Lego Minifigures theme. Tara Wike explained, "Here's a good example… I'll go to Austin and say, ‘let's do an elephant girl', and he'll doodle that up and we'll go brief the sculptors. And it's usually not just out of thin air, we've done some other animal helmets before, so we've got some experience with that. We'll have a rough wish, but we know that we'll have limitations, and we go to the sculptors and they come back with their proposal, and we always have a mould engineer sitting in on our weekly design meeting so that they can flag things right away. But our sculptors are actually very good at knowing what we can get in and out of a mould." Creative Lead Astrid Graabæk explained, "We design both for kids and adults in this theme. We look at what kids from five year olds and up find exciting, that also sparks their imagination and trigger play for them. At the same time, we also look at what is exciting for adults, and especially AFOLs. Are there new elements, character choices, or colour changes we think would be exciting? We launch three times a year and it's a variety of classic launches (numbered series) and also these external IP such as Looney Tunes which is the current one out now."

== Collectible Minifigures ==
According to BrickLink, The Lego Group has released 739 Collectible Minifigures (CMF).

No.	Set number	Series name	Release date	No. of Minifigures	Notes
1	08683	Series 1	5 March 2010	16	Consists of Tribal Hunter, Cheerleader, Caveman, Circus clown, Zombie, Skater, Robot, Demolition Dummy, Magician, Super Wrestler, Nurse, Ninja, Spaceman, Forestman, Deep Sea Diver, and Cowboy.
2	08684	Series 2	2 September 2010	16	Consists of Maraca Man, Spartan Warrior, Ringmaster, Witch, Vampire, Traffic Cop, Explorer, Lifeguard, Mime, Weight Lifter, Pop Star, Skier, Disco Dude, Karate Master, Surfer, and Pharaoh.
3	08803	Series 3	14 January 2011	16	Consists of Fisherman, Pilot, Tribal chief, Samurai Warrior, Snowboarder, Space Villain, Sumo Wrestler, Mummy, Elf, Tennis Player, Race Car Driver, Gorilla suit Guy, Space Alien, Hula Dancer, Rapper, and Baseball Player.
4	08804	Series 4	1 April 2011	16	Consists of Lawn Gnome, Kimono Girl, Musketeer, Punk rocker, Surfer Girl, Viking, The Monster, Hockey Player, Street Skater, Sailor, Soccer Player, Werewolf, Hazmat Guy, Artist, Ice Skater, and Crazy Scientist.
5	08805	Series 5	22 August 2011	16	Consists of Graduate, Gladiator, Royal Guard, Eskimo, Cave Woman, Lizard Man, Zookeeper, Lumberjack, Small Clown, Fitness Instructor, Detective, Evil Dwarf, Boxer, Egyptian Queen, Gangster, and Snowboarder Guy
6	08827	Series 6	December 2011	16	Consists of Classic Alien, Highland Battler, Sleepyhead, Lady Liberty, Bandit, Flamenco Dancer, Clockwork Robot, Minotaur, Leprechaun, Roman Soldier, Surgeon, Skateboarder Girl, Intergalactic Girl, Butcher, Mechanic, and Genie.
7	08831	Series 7	May 2012	16	Consists of Swimming Champion, Aztec Warrior, Bunny Suit Guy, Bride, Ocean King, Bagpiper, Daredevil, Galaxy Patrol, Tennis Ace, Jungle Boy, Hippie, Computer Programmer, Viking Woman, Evil Knight, Rocker Girl, and Grandma Visitor.
8	08909	Team GB Olympic Series	July 2012	9	Consists of Agile Archer, Brawny Boxer, Flexible Gymnast, Judo Fighter, Tactical Tennis Player, Tennis racket, Wondrous Weightlifter, Relay Runner, Stealth Swimmer, and Horseback Rider. Released exclusively in the UK and based on Team GB to commemorate the London 2012 Summer Olympics
9	08833	Series 8	September 2012	16	Consists of Evil Robot, Conquistador, Lederhosen Guy, Cowgirl, Football Player, Diver, Downhill Skiing, Businessman, Fairy, Santa Claus, Vampire bat, DJ, Red Cheerleader, Thespian, Pirate Captain, and Alien Villainess.
10	71000	Series 9	7 October 2012	16	Consists of Waiter, Cyclops, Hollywood Starlet, Heroic Knight, Roman emperor, Policeman, Chicken suit Guy, Roller derby Girl, Fortune-Teller, Judge, Alien Avenger, Mermaid, Battle Mech, Mr. Good and Evil, Forest Maiden, and Plumber.
11	71001	Series 10	6 February 2013	17	Consists of Mr. Gold (Only 5000 Produced), Librarian, Medusa, Roman Commander, Warrior Woman, Tomahawk Warrior, Skydiver, Bumblebee Girl, Grandfather, Paintball Player, Sea captain, Sad Clown, Revolutionary Soldier, Baseball Fielder, Trendsetter, Decorator, and Motorcycle Mechanic.
12	71002	Series 11	30 June 2013	16	Consists of Barbarian, Scarecrow, Pretzel Girl, Evil Robot Mech, Island Warrior, Gingerbread man, Christmas elf, Yeti, Mountain Climber, Welder, Scientist, Diner Waitress, Grandma, Constable, and Lady Robot.
13	71004	The Lego Movie Series	January 2014	16	Based on The Lego Movie and consisting of Calamity Drone, President Business, Hard Hat Emmet, Wild West Wyldstyle, Abraham Lincoln, Mrs. Scratchen-Post, Bad Cop / Good Cop, William Shakespeare, Gail the construction worker, Larry the Barista, Velma Staplebot, Taco Tuesday Guy, "Where Are My Pants?" Guy, Wiley Fusebot, Panda Guy, and Marsha: Queen of the Mermaids.
14	71005	The Lego Simpsons Series 1	May 2014	16	Based on The Simpsons and consisting of Homer Simpson, Bart Simpson, Marge Simpson, Lisa Simpson, Maggie Simpson, Grampa Simpson, Ned Flanders, Krusty the Clown, Milhouse Van Houten, Ralph Wiggum, Apu Nahasapeemapetilon, Nelson Muntz, Itchy, Scratchy, Chief Wiggum, and Mr. Burns.
15	71007	Series 12	August 2014	16	Consists of Wizard, Hun Warrior, Fairytale Princess, Video Game Guy, Battle Goddess, Space Miner, Lifeguard, Prospector, Jester, Dino Tracker, Pizza delivery Man, Rock Star, Swashbuckler, Piggy Guy, Genie Girl, and Spooky Girl.
16	71008	Series 13	December 2014	16	Consists of Classic King, Sheriff, Unicorn Girl, Snake Charmer, Goblin, Paleontologist, Alien Trooper, Egyptian Warrior, Carpenter, Evil Wizard, Fencer, Samurai (female variant), Disco Diva, Hot dog Guy, Lady Cyclops, and Galaxy Trooper.
17	71009	The Lego Simpsons Series 2	April 2015	16	Based on The Simpsons and consisting of Date Night Homer Simpsons, Date Night Marge Simpson, Sunday Best Lisa and Snowball II, Maggie Simpson and Santa's Little Helper, Bartman, Fallout Boy Milhouse Van Houten, Comic Book Guy, Martin Prince, Professor Frink, Hans Moleman, Patty and Selma, Groundskeeper Willie, Edna Krabappel, Waylon Smithers, and Dr. Hibbert.
18	71010	Series 14	August 2015	16	Branded as a "Monsters Series" and consisting of Wolf Guy, Zombie Pirate, Monster Scientist, Wacky Witch, Plant Monster, Fly Monster, Specter, Zombie Cheerleader, Tiger Woman, Gargoyle, Skeleton, Zombie Rocker, Zombie Businessman, Banshee, Square Foot, and Spider Lady.
19	71011	Series 15	5 December 2015	16	Consists of Farmer, Astronaut, Frightening Knight, Clumsy Guy, Tribal Woman, Flying Warrior, Faun, Animal Control, Janitor, Ballerina, Laser Mech, Kendo Fighter, Shark Suit Guy, Wrestling Champion, Jewel Thief, and Queen.
20	71012	The Lego Disney Series 1	1 May 2016	18	Based on Disney characters and consisting of Stitch, Pizza Planet Alien, Buzz Lightyear, Aladdin, Genie, Maleficent, Alice, Cheshire Cat, Daisy Duck, Donald Duck, Minnie Mouse, Mickey Mouse, Mr. Incredible, Syndrome, Peter Pan, Captain Hook, Ursula, and Ariel.
21	71014	DFB Series	May 2016	16	Exclusively in Europe. Based on DFB - The Mannschaft (Germany National Football Team) and consists of Joachim Löw, Manuel Neuer, Jérôme Boateng, Mats Hummels, Benedikt Höwedes, Shkodran Mustafi, Bastian Schweinsteiger, Mesut Özil, Thomas Müller, Toni Kroos, Sami Khedira, André Schürrle, Marco Reus, Christoph Kramer, Mario Götze, and Max Kruse.
22	71013	Series 16	1 September 2016	16	Consists of Ice Queen, Desert Warrior, Cyborg, Cute Little Devil, Spooky Boy, Hiker, Wildlife Photographer, Kickboxer, Scallywag Pirate, Penguin Boy, Rogue, Dog Show Winner, Mariachi, Spy, Banana Guy, and Babysitter.
23	71017	The Lego Batman Movie Series 1	1 January 2017	20	Based on The Lego Batman Movie and consisting of Lobster-Lovin' Batman, Glam Metal Batman, Fairy Batman, Clan of the Cave Batman, Vacation Batman, Barbara Gordon, Commissioner Gordon, Arkham Asylum Joker, Dick Grayson, Pink Power Batgirl, Red Hood, Eraser, Nurse Harley Quinn, Orca, Zodiac Master, Catman, March Harriet, Calculator, King Tut, and Mime.
24	71018	Series 17	1 May 2017	16	Consists of Pro Surfer, Strongman, Gourmet Chef, Corncob Guy, Veterinarian, Hot Dog Vendor, Butterfly Girl, Roman Gladiator, Connoisseur, Battle Dwarf, Retro Space Hero, Yuppie, Rocket Boy, Dance Instructor, Elf Maiden, and Highwayman.
25	71019	The Lego Ninjago Movie Series	1 August 2017	20	Based on The Lego Ninjago Movie and consisting of Kai Kendo, Spinjitzu Training Nya, Lloyd Garmadon (Green Ninja version), Master Wu, Garmadon, Jay Walker, Lloyd Garmadon, Cole, Misako, Zane, Shark Army General #1, Shark Army Octopus, Shark Army Angler, Shark Army Great White, Flashback Garmadon, Volcano Garmadon, Gong and Guitar Rocker, GPL Tech, Sushi Chef, and N-POP Girl.
26	71020	The Lego Batman Movie Series 2	1 January 2018	20	Based on The Lego Batman Movie and consisting of Disco Harley Quinn, Disco Alfred Pennyworth, Clock King, Hugo Strange, Mermaid Batman, Swimsuit Batman, Vacation Joker, Vacation Robin, Vacation Batgirl, Vacation Alfred Pennyworth, Bat-Merch Batgirl, Killer Moth, the Wonder Twins, Apache Chief, Jor-El, General Zod, Doctor Phosphorus, Black Canary, and Black Vulcan.
27	71021	Series 18	1 April 2018	17	A party-themed series to celebrate the 40th anniversary of the Lego minifigure. It consists of Elephant Girl, Brick Suit Guy, Brick Suit Girl, Party Clown, Firework Guy, Birthday party Girl, Dragon Suit Guy, Classic Police officer, Spider Suit Boy, Birthday cake Guy, Cactus Guy, Cat Costume Girl, Race Car Guy, Flowerpot Girl, Birthday Party Guy, and Unicorn Guy.
28	71022	The Lego Harry Potter and Fantastic Beasts Series 1	1 August 2018	22	Based on Harry Potter and Fantastic Beasts franchises and consisting of Harry Potter, Hermione Granger, Ron Weasley, Draco Malfoy, Luna Lovegood, Neville Longbottom, Cho Chang, Dean Thomas, Lord Voldemort, Dobby, Professor Trelawney, Cedric Diggory, Professor Flitwick, Alastor 'Mad-Eye' Moody, Invisibility Cloak Harry Potter, Albus Dumbledore, Newt Scamander, Tina Goldstein, Jacob Kowalski, Queenie Goldstein, Credence Barebone, and Percival Graves.
29	71023	The Lego Movie 2: The Second Part Series	1 February 2019	20	Based on The Lego Movie 2: The Second Part and consisting of Awesome Remix Emmet, Battle-Ready Lucy, Swamp Creature (Apocalypseburg version), Crayon Girl, Giraffe Guy, Watermelon Dude, Sherry Scratchen-Post and Scarfield (Apocalypseburg version), Apocalypseburg Benny, Vest Friends Rex, Dorothy Gale, Cowardly Lion, Tin Man, Scarecrow, Gone Golfin' President Business, Flashback Lucy, Candy Rapper, Kitty Pop, Apocalypseburg Abraham Lincoln, Unikitty, and Hula Lula.
30	71024	The Lego Disney Series 2	1 May 2019	18	Based on Disney characters and consisting of Vintage Mickey, Vintage Minnie, Huey, Dewey, and Louie, Scrooge McDuck, Chip 'n' Dale, Elsa, Anna, Jafar, Princess Jasmine, Hades, Hercules, Sally, Jack Skellington, Edna Mode, and Frozone.
31	71025	Series 19	1 September 2019	16	Consisting of Video Game Champ, Shower Guy, Fright Knight, Monkey King, Female Programmer, Mummy Queen, Jungle Explorer, Firefighter, Dogsitter, Pizza Costume Guy, Galactic Bounty hunter, Gardener, Rugby Player, Fox Costume Girl, Bear Costume Guy, and Mountain Biker.
32	71026	The Lego DC Super Heroes Series	January 2020	16	Based on DC Super Heroes and consisting of Mister Miracle, Wonder Woman, Aquaman, Stargirl, Sinestro, Cheetah (Priscilla Rich), Superman, Green Lantern (Simon Baz), Cyborg, Batman, Huntress, Metamorpho, Joker, Bumblebee, Flash (Jay Garrick), and Bat-Mite.
33	71027	Series 20	19 April 2020	16	Consists of Piñata Boy, Breakdancer, Pea Pod Costume Girl, Tournament Knight, Pirate Girl, Space Fan, Llama Costume Girl, Viking, Super Warrior, Martial Arts Boy, Athlete, Sea Rescuer, Brick Costume Boy, 80's Musician, Pyjama Girl, and Drone Boy.
34	71028	The Lego Harry Potter Series 2	1 September 2020	16	Based on Harry Potter franchise and consisting of Harry Potter (Half-Blood Prince variant), Albus Dumbledore, Ron Weasley (Half-Blood Prince variant), Luna Lovegood (Half-Blood Prince variant), Griphook, Lily Potter, James Potter, Ginny Weasley (Half-Blood Prince variant), Fred Weasley (Goblet of Fire variant), George Weasley (Goblet of Fire variant), Bellatrix Lestrange (Prisoner of Azkaban variant), Kingsley Shacklebolt, Moaning Myrtle (Chamber of Secrets variant), Pomona Sprout (Chamber of Secrets variant), and Neville Longbottom (Prisoner of Azkaban variant).
35	71029	Series 21	1 January 2021	12	Consists of Paddle Surfer, Violin Kid, Shipwreck Survivor, Ladybug Girl, Pug Costume Guy, Centaur Warrior, Beekeeper, Ancient Warrior, Airplane Girl, Space Police Guy, Alien, and Cabaret Singer.
36	71030	The Lego Looney Tunes Series	26 April 2021	12	Based on Looney Tunes franchise and consisting of Lola Bunny, Bugs Bunny, Wile E. Coyote and the Road Runner, Tweety, Sylvester the Cat, Daffy Duck, Speedy Gonzales, Tasmanian Devil, Marvin the Martian, Petunia Pig, and Porky Pig.
37	71031	Marvel Collectible Minifigure Series 1	1 September 2021	12	Based on Marvel Cinematic Universe franchise and consisting of Scarlet Witch, Vision, Monica Rambeau, Captain America (Sam Wilson), Bucky Barnes, Loki (2021 variant), Sylvie, Captain Carter, Star-Lord T'Challa, Zombie Steve Rogers, Zombie Hunter Spider-Man, and Gamora.
38	71032	Series 22	1 January 2022	12	Consists of Robot Repair Tech, Chili Costume Fan, Troubadour, Snow Guardian, Horse and Groom, Figure Skating Champion, Night Protector, Forest Elf, Birdwatcher, Raccoon Costume Fan, Space Creature, and Wheelchair Racer.
39	71033	The Lego Muppets Series	1 May 2022	12	Based on Jim Henson's Muppets franchise and consisting of Rowlf the Dog, Bunsen Honeydew, Beaker, Gonzo, Kermit the Frog, Miss Piggy, Fozzie Bear, Animal, Statler and Waldorf, Swedish Chef, and Janice.
40	71034	Series 23	1 September 2022	12	Consists of Cardboard Robot, Christmas elf, Ferry Captain, Green Dragon Costume, Knight of the Yellow Castle, Nutcracker, Popcorn Costume, Reindeer Costume, Snowman, Sugar Fairy, Turkey Costume, Wolf Costume
41	71037	Series 24	1 January 2023	12	Consists of Brown Astronaut and Spacebaby, Carrot Mascot, Conservationist, Falconer, Football Referee, Newspaper Kid, Orc, Potter, Robot Warrior, Rockin' Horse Rider, Rococo Aristocrat, and T-Rex Costume Fan.
42	71038	The Lego Disney 100 Minifigure Series	1 May 2023	18	Based on Disney characters and consisting of Oswald the Lucky Rabbit, Pinocchio, Jiminy Cricket, Sorcerer Mickey, Princess Tiana, Dr. Facilier, the Queen of Hearts, Princess Aurora, Mulan, Ernesto de la Cruz, Miguel Rivera, Pocahontas, Cruella de Vil, Robin Hood, Prince John, Stitch, Baymax, and the Evil Queen.
43	71039	Marvel Collectible Minifigure Series 2	1 September 2023	12	Based on Marvel Cinematic Universe franchise and consisting of Agatha Harkness, Moon Knight, Mr. Knight, Werewolf by Night, She-Hulk, Hawkeye, Kate Bishop, Goliath, Echo, Beast, Storm, and Wolverine.
44	71045	Series 25	1 January 2024	12	Consists of Film Noir Detective, E-Sports Gamer, Vampire Knight, Sprinter, Goatherd, Mushroom Sprite, Fitness Instructor, Triceratops Costume Fan, Harpy, Train Kid, Fierce Barbarian, and Pet Groomer.
45	71046	Series 26	1 May 2024	12	A science fiction theme series that consists of Spacewalking Astronaut, Imposter, Alien Tourist, Retro Space Heroine, M-Tron Powerlifter, Nurse Android, Flying Saucer Costume Fan, Ice Planet Explorer, Robot Butler, Alien Beetlezoid, Orion, and Blacktron Mutant.
46	71047	Dungeons & Dragons	1 September 2024	12	Based on the Dungeons & Dragons franchise and consists of Halfling Druid, Strahd von Zarovich, Gith Warlock, The Lady of Pain, Dwarf Barbarian, Tasha the Witch Queen, Elf Bard, Dragonborn Paladin, Tiefling Sorcerer, Aarakocra Ranger, Szass Tam, and Mind Flayer.
47	71048	Series 27	1 January 2025	12	Consists of Hamster Costume Fan, Wolfpack Beastmaster, Jetpack Racer, Astronomer Kid, Plush Toy Collector, Pterodactyl Costume Fan, Longboarder, Bogeyman, Cupid, Pirate Quartermaster, Cat Lover, and Steampunk Inventor.
48	71050	Spider-Man Across The SpiderVerse	1 September 2025	12	Based on the Spider-Man animated movies and consisting of Spider-Byte, Spider-Gwen, Spider-Punk, Spider-Man India and Spider-Cat, Miles Morales, Peter Parker and May "Mayday" Parker, Werewolf Spider-Man, Spider-Man 2099 and Lyla, Sun-Spider, Web-Slinger and Spider-Horse, Cyborg Spider-Man, and Prowler of Earth-42 (Miles Morales).
49	71051	Series 28	1 January 2026	12	Animal-themed costumes, comprising a lion, monkey, cat, Dalmatian, rabbit, koala, parrot, peacock, goldfish, dolphin, crocodile, and frog.
50	71052	Series 29	1 May 2026	12	Consist of Football Goalkeeper, Marine Biologist, Tuba Player, Unicorn Elf, Monster Hunter, Robot T. rex, Chocolatier, Boba Cup Fan, Bionicle Cosplayer (based on 8534 Tahu), Mysterious Ronin, Cute Witch, and Trash Monster
51	71053	Shrek	1 September 2026	12	Shrek

== Online games ==
=== LEGO Minifigures Online ===
On 29 August 2013, Funcom officially announced a massively multiplayer online game based on the Minifigures theme, in which there are several worlds the player can travel to and fight enemies, as well as dungeons based on the setting. The game used traditional click-to-move mechanics, allowing younger users to jump into the action. However, for advanced users, there were special abilities activated using the number pad. It was going to be free-to-play, but you could unlock Minifigures by purchasing one and entering a code, however they could also be obtained in-game. It was released in late 2014 for iOS, Android, and PC as either a download client or in-browser on the LEGO website.

Funcom announced that LEGO Minifigures Online would be closing on 30 September 2016. Starting 6 June 2016, new players will be unable to join the game and the in-game chat will be disabled. Existing players would still be able to play up until 30 September 2016.

== Other merchandise ==
In 2022, the Lego Minifigures brand also produced a Plush Toy Collection.

== Awards and nominations ==
In 2022, Lego Marvel Series Collectible Minifigures (set number: 71031) was awarded "Toy of the Year" and "Collectible of the Year" by the Toy Association.

In September 2022, The Muppets (set number: 71033) was awarded "Toy of the Year" and "Collectible of the Year" by the Toy Association.
