= Lego Exo-Force =

Lego toy line

- Sub‑themes: Deep Jungle and Golden City
- Subject: Mecha
- Availability: 2006–2008
- Total sets: 38
- Characters: Hikaru, Takeshi, Ryo, Ha-Ya-To, Keiken and Hitomi

Lego Exo-Force is a discontinued Lego theme that was launched in 2006 and discontinued in 2008. It focused on a team of elite pilots that used robotic mechanical machines (mecha) to protect their home against attacking robots. The backstory for the toy sets was detailed in associated media, including an online comic and a series of story books.

== Overview ==
Exo-Force was the first Lego theme to focus on robotic mechanical machines controlled by humans (mecha). This concept often referenced Japanese manga and anime. Previous Lego Space themes had included elements of this, such as Spyrius in 1994 and Roboforce in 1997, but Exo-Force was the first theme to be driven by a detailed storyline. The toy line was produced in waves from 2006 to 2008 and was accompanied by a series of story books and 39 issues of the Exo-Force online comic, which was released between November 2005 and March 2008. Exo-Force centered on a group of elite human pilots that were tasked with defending their home from drone machines that were under the control of a robot named Meca One. Each member of the group piloted unique mecha weapons to battle the robots and then travelled to a jungle to rescue their leader.

== Development ==
The concept for Exo-Force was developed at a time following a period of financial problems for The Lego Group in the early 2000s. As part of the financial recovery, the company aimed to create original themes that would appeal to children and adults. Due to the rising public interest in Japanese anime during this period, which was driven by shows like Dragon Ball Z, Pokémon, and Yu-Gi-Oh, The Lego Group made the decision to create an original anime-inspired theme.

== Release ==
The Exo-Force theme launched in 2006 with the first wave of toy sets. The first wave of sets sold well enough in the first year to continue the theme with a second and third wave. However, after three years Exo-Force was discontinued and the storyline was never completed. Lego Community Development Manager Jan Beyer explained, "Regarding the low sales of the Exo-Force line, the decision was made to stop the line at the end of 2008. The sales were good in 2006 but in 2007 the sales did not meet the expectations and the expectation was that even an expensive marketing campaign could not get the sales to the expected level."

== Story ==
On Sentai Mountain, a peaceful civilization exists where advanced robots and the ancient way of life go hand in hand. But one day, a golden robot named Meca One leads the robots to revolt against the humans. Fights between the humans and robots break out, unleashing uncontrollable energies that divide the mountain in two. The humans eventually overcome the robots and cast them into the gorge.

The humans build bridges to link the two halves of the mountain. The most important bridge they built is the Tenchi (天地 "heaven & earth") Bridge. Some humans, including Sensei Keiken, fear that the robots might come back someday, so Keiken promptly begins to construct armored battle machines for defense. But before the humans' preparations are complete, the robot legions, armed with battle machines of their own, catch the humans by surprise and quickly seize control of the southern half of the mountain. More powerful than ever, their primary aim is to completely drive humanity from Sentai Mountain. Keiken hurriedly recruits new pilots to man the battle machines and Exo-Force is born.

The Exo-Force storyline for 2006 culminates in the Battle of Sentai Fortress when Meca One unleashes an all-out assault on the humans. After a narrow victory, Keiken decides that Exo-Force is too vulnerable in the Sentai Fortress and that they need an "edge" to defeat the robots.

The 2007 storyline centers around Exo-Force's discovery of the legendary Golden City at the top of Sentai Mountain and mysterious secret codes therein which could be used to unlock powerful technology. Keiken's hope is that this technology will provide the crucial key to defeating the robots.

In the 2008 storyline, Keiken is captured, and is being held captive by the robots in the jungle at the base of Sentai Mountain. The Exo-Force pilots must rescue their leader in this hostile jungle environment that holds the secret to what gave the robots life and the will to destroy. This plot was not resolved and the theme was discontinued after a single online comic.

== Main characters ==
=== Humans ===
- Hikaru (光; "light", "shining"): Hikaru is serious, silent, and wants to win. He prefers to work solo, but has learned to count on his teammates. He is a natural tactician and commander, though he can seem cold or overly logical at times. Hikaru is an incredible marksman and highly skilled at aerial combat.
- Takeshi (武; "military", "warrior", "chivalry") - Takeshi is grim, fierce, and a little crazy. He lives for one thing – to smash robots and their battle machines into tiny little pieces. Unlike Hikaru, Takeshi is much more likely to react instinctively and emotionally in a crisis, rather than relying on logic and planning.
- Ryo (亮; "bright", "clear"): Ryo talks and moves fast. He is a whiz with any kind of tool or circuit. He was part of the design team that created many of the battle machines used by Exo-Force. Ryo is incredibly gifted at engineering and repair work, with a real flair for technological improvisation in a crisis.
- Ha-Ya-To (隼人; "falcon person"): Ha-Ya-To is adventurous, a joker, and loves to fly. He's at his happiest and is most comfortable in the air, even if it means putting himself in harm's way. He is addicted to the adrenaline rush of battle and usually has a joke on his lips no matter how bad the situation.
- Keiken (経験; "experience"): As Exo-Force's aged and wise leader, Keiken has a long history. It was he who first designed Meca One, the robot who later led the rebellion against the human race. Stern, paternal, firm in his convictions and universally respected, Keiken provides the guidance the young pilots need.
- Hitomi (瞳; "pupil"): Granddaughter of Sensei Keiken, Hitomi showed an aptitude for mechanical work from an early age. She is smart and smart-mouthed; a risk-taker who feels she has something to prove. During a fierce robot attack, she had the opportunity to commandeer an untested battle machine, the Blazing Falcon. Using it to defeat the robots, her heroism left Keiken no choice but to make her a full member of Exo-Force. After Sensei Keiken was kidnapped by Meca One, Hitomi was surprised to find out that her grandfather had left instructions that she should be in charge of Exo-Force in the event of his capture.

=== Robots ===
- Meca One: Meca One is cold, ruthless, and logical. As the first robot ever to rebel against the humans, Meca One is now the supreme leader of the robot army. Meca One has replicated itself as a safety measure, which makes it more difficult for Exo-Force to simply target Meca One and try to end the rebellion that way. He is colored gold with red eyes.
- Devastator: Devastators are sly, cunning, and cruel. These silver robots are the elite troops of the robot rebellion. Devastators have been known to go out of their way to cause damage to civilian dwellings, or to pursue wounded battle machines for long distances just to finish them off. Exo-Force pilots have reported seeing Devastators of various colors.
- Iron Drone: Iron Drones are strong and durable. As the foot soldiers for the robot army, they are very good at following orders, but terrible at improvising in an unexpected situation or devising any kind of strategy.

== Construction sets ==
According to BrickLink, The Lego Group released a total of 38 Lego sets as part of the Lego Exo-Force theme. It was discontinued by the end of 2008. In 2006, the theme released a variety of individual battle machines, such as Grand Titan and Mobile Defence Tank, and robot machines, such as Thunder Fury. The largest sets were Striking Venom, the robot's battle station, and Sentai Fortress. In 2007, the story was set in the Golden City, with the Fight for the Golden Tower set at its centre. The Exo-Force also had newly designed mecha. In 2008, the story moved to the jungle, which introduced new toy vehicles, such as Storm Lasher and Hybrid Rescue Tank. The minifigures in this theme were created with a unique style that included cartoon-style hair pieces and anime-style faces.

=== Original sets ===
The motto for Exo-Force in 2006 was "Time to Power Up!". 16 sets were released in 2006:

- Stealth Hunter (set number: 7700) was released in 2006. The set consisted of 164 pieces with 1 minifigure. The set included a minifigure of Hikaru. Unit Designation is A.01 龍翼 (Dragon Wing) and Alternative Model is Stealth Wasp.
- Grand Titan (set number: 7701) was released in 2006. The set consisted of 194 pieces with 1 minifigure. The set included a minifigure of Takeshi. Unit Designation is L.01 龍牙 (Dragon Fang) and Alternative Model is Titan Tracker.
- Thunder Fury (set number: 7702) was released in 2006. The set consisted of 197 pieces with 1 minifigure. The set included a minifigure of Devastator (Red). Unit Designation is TF.7702 and Alternative Model is Fire Fury.
- Fire Vulture (set number: 7703) was released in 2006. The set consisted of 177 pieces with 1 minifigure. The set included a minifigure of Devastator (Blue). Unit Designation is FV.7703 and Alternative Model is Hover Hawk.
- Sonic Phantom (set number: 7704) was released in 2006. The set consisted of 215 pieces with 1 minifigure. The set included a minifigure of Devastator (Green). Unit Designation is SP.7704 and Alternative Model is Speeder Phantom.
- Gate Assault (set number: 7705) was released in 2006. The set consisted of 402 pieces with 5 minifigures. The set included Ha-Ya-To, Human Soldier and 3 Iron Drones minifigures. Gate Defender Unit Designation is A.02 鷹 (Falcon) and Sentry II Unit Designation is 7705. Alternative Models is Swift and Blockade Bulldozer.
- Mobile Defense Tank (set number: 7706) was released in 2006. The set consisted of 365 pieces with 2 minifigures. The set included a minifigure of Ryo and Human Soldier. Unit Designation is AT.02 登山車 (Mountain Climbing Vehicle) and Alternative Model is Advance Tactical Unit.
- Striking Venom (set number: 7707) was released in 2006. The set consisted of 646 pieces with 7 minifigures. The set included Meca One and 6 Iron Drone minifigures. Unit Designation is SV.7707 and Alternative Model is Frontline Barricade.
- Uplink (set number: 7708) was released in 2006. The set consisted of 69 pieces with 1 minifigure. The set included a minifigure of Ryo. Unit Designation is AT.01 虎 (Tiger) and Alternative Model and Link Transporter.
- Sentai Fortress (set number: 7709) was released in 2006. The set consisted of 1408 pieces with 8 minifigures. The set included Keiken, Hikaru, Takeshi, Ryo, Ha-Ya-To, Meca One and 2 Iron Drone minifigures. Silent Strike Unit Designation is A.04 天王 (Sky King). Alternative Models is Sentai Tower and Blightrunner.
- Sentry (set number: 7711) was released in 2006. The set consisted of 78 pieces with 1 minifigure. The set included a minifigure of Iron Drone. Unit Designation is 7711 and Alternative Model is Laser Sentry.
- Supernova (set number: 7712) was released in 2006. The set consisted of 283 pieces with 1 minifigure. The set included a minifigure of Takeshi. Unit Designation is L.02 炎王 (Flame King) and Alternative Model is Nova Crawler.
- 'Bridge Walker vs. White Lightning (set number: 7713) was released in 2006. The set consisted of 632 pieces with 4 minifigures. The set included Ha-Ya-To, Meca One and 2 Devastator minifigures. White Lightning Unit Designation is A.03 白雷 (White Thunder) and Bridge Walker Unit Designation is BW.7713. Alternative Models is Fire Eagle and Raven Attacker.

=== Golden City sets ===
15 sets were released in 2007:

- Golden Guardian (set number: 7714) was released in 2007. The set consisted of 267 pieces with 1 minifigure. The set included a minifigure of Ha-Ya-To. Unit Designation is A.11 金武 (Golden Warrior).
- Combat Crawler X2 (set number: 7721) was released in 2007. The set consisted of 581 pieces with 3 minifigures. The set included a minifigure of Ryo, Iron Drone and Devastator (Red). Unit Designation is 7721.
- Cyclone Defender (set number: 8100) was released in 2007. The set consisted of 92 pieces with 1 minifigure. The set included a minifigure of Ryo. Unit Designation is AT.10 虎 (Tiger).
- Claw Crusher (set number: 8101) was released in 2007. The set consisted of 99 pieces with 1 minifigure. The set included a minifigure of Devastator. Unit Designation is 8101.
- Blade Titan (set number: 8102) was released in 2007. The set consisted of 162 pieces with 1 minifigure. The set included a minifigure of Takeshi. Unit Designation is L.10 銳刃 (Sharp Blade).
- Sky Guardian (set number: 8103) was released in 2007. The set consisted of 144 pieces with 1 minifigure. The set included a minifigure of Hikaru. Unit Designation is A.10 音速 (Speed of Sound).
- Shadow Crawler (set number: 8104) was released in 2007. The set consisted of 161 pieces with 2 minifigures. The set included a minifigure of Devastator (Green) and skeleton. Unit Designation is 8104.
- Iron Condor (set number: 8105) was released in 2007. The set consists of 141 pieces with 1 minifigure. The set included Lego minifigure of Devastator (Red). Unit Designation is 8105.
- Aero Booster (set number: 8106) was released in 2007. The set consisted of 312 pieces with 1 minifigure. The set included a minifigure of Ha-Ya-To. Unit Designation is A.12 虎 (Tiger).
- Fight for the Golden Tower (set number: 8107) was released in 2007. The set consisted of 571 pieces with 2 minifigures. The set included a minifigure of Hitomi and Devastator. Sonic Raven Unit Designation is 8107.
- Mobile Devastator (set number: 8108) was released in 2007. The set consisted of 1009 pieces with 13 minifigure. The set included Ryo, Meca One, 3 Devastator, 6 Iron Drone and 2 skeleton minifigures. Blazing Falcon Unit Designation is A.13 狩猟 (Hunter).

=== Deep Jungle sets ===
7 sets were released in 2008:

- River Dragon (set number: 8111) was released in 2008. The set consisted of 115 pieces with 1 minifigure. The set included a minifigure of Ha-Ya-To. Unit Designation is W.20 速攻 (Quick Attack).
- Battle Arachnoid (set number: 8112) was released in 2008. The set consisted of 312 pieces with 1 minifigure. The set included a minifigure of Devastator. Unit Designation is 8112 紅蜘蛛 (Red Spider).
- Assault Tiger (set number: 8113) was released in 2008. The set consisted of 160 pieces with 1 minifigure. The set included a minifigure of Takeshi. Unit Designation is L.20 凄裂 (Dreadful Ripping).
- Chameleon Hunter (set number: 8114) was released in 2008. The set consisted of 185 pieces with 1 minifigure. The set included a minifigure of Hikaru. Unit Designation is L.21 幻術 (Illusion Power).
- Dark Panther (set number: 8115) was released in 2008. The set consisted of 222 pieces with 3 minifigures. The set included a minifigure of Devastator and 2 Iron Drones. Unit Designation is 8115 暗闇豹 (Darkness Panther)
- Storm Lasher (set number: 8117) was released in 2008. The set consisted of 275 pieces with 1 minifigure. The set included a minifigure of Iron Drone. Unit Designation is 8117 鬼蜻蜓 (Ghost Dragonfly).
- Hybrid Rescue Tank (set number: 8118) was released in 2008. The set consisted of 339 pieces with 1 minifigures. The set included a minifigure of Ryo and Keiken. Unit Designation is AT.20 毒霧 (Poison Mist).

=== Combined models ===
One of the features of the Exo-Force toy line was that two or more battle machines could be combined to make a super battle machine.

- Mountain Warrior (set number: 7700 and 7701) is the combination of the Stealth Hunter and Grand Titan.
- Raging Storm (set number: 7702 and 7703) is the combination of the Thunder Fury and Fire Vulture.
- Robot Reaper 1.0 (set number: 7700 and 7703) is the combination of the Stealth Hunter and Fire Vulture.
- Blazing Hunter (set number: 7700 and 7703) is the combination of the Stealth Hunter and Fire Vulture.
- Magnalink (set number: 7706 and 7709) is the combination of the Mobile Defense Tank and Sentai Fortress.
- Sky Titan (set number: 8100, 8102 and 8103) is the combination of the Cyclone Defender, Blade Titan and Sky Guardian.
- Iron Crusher (set number: 8101, 8104 and 8105) is the combination of the Claw Crusher, Shadow Crawler and Iron Condor.
- River Dragon + Chameleon Hunter (set number: 8111 and 8114) is the combination of the River Dragon and Chameleon Hunter.
- Battle Arachnoid + Dark Panther (set number: 8112 and 8115) is the combination of the Battle Arachnoid and Dark Panther.
- Assault Tiger + Chameleon Hunter (set number: 8113 and 8114) is the combination of the Assault Tiger and Chameleon Hunter.
- Dark Panther + Storm Lasher (set number: 8115 and 8117) is the combination of the Dark Panther and Storm Lasher.

=== Promotional sets ===
These promotional sets were released in Europe (e.g. packaged with Donald Duck magazine in Denmark) and are not part of the main toy line.

==== Original ====
- Robot Walker (set number: 5965) was released in 2006. The set consisted of 24 pieces with 1 minifigure. The set included a minifigure of Devastator.
- Flyer (set number: 5966) was released in 2006. The set consisted of 22 pieces with 1 minifigure. The set included a minifigure of Hikaru.
- Walker (set number: 5967) was released in 2006. The set consisted of 22 pieces with 1 minifigure. The set included a minifigure of Takeshi.

==== Golden City ====
- Walker (set number: 3870) was released in 2007. The set consisted of 26 pieces with 1 minifigure. The set included a minifigure of Takeshi.
- Flyer (set number: 3871) was released in 2007. The set consists of 21 pieces with 1 minifigure. The set included a minifigure of Ha-Ya-To.
- Robo Chopper (set number: 3872) was released in 2007. The set consisted of 29 pieces with 1 minifigure. The set included a minifigure of Devastator (Red).
- Mini Jet Fighter (set number: 3885) was released in 2007. The consisted of 22 pieces with 1 minifigure. The set included a minifigure of Hikaru.
- Green Exo Fighter (set number: 3886) was released in 2007. The set consisted of 19 pieces with 1 minifigure. The set included a minifigure of Ryo.

== Comics ==
The Exo-Force story was told through a series of online comics on the Lego website. A new comic was released approximately every month. Below is a list of the titles and release date of each episode.

| # | Name | Release date |
|---|---|---|
| 0 | The First Battle | November 15, 2005 |
| 1 | Stealth Hunter vs. Fire Vulture | January 5, 2006 |
| 2 | Takeshi and Hikaru Continue the Battle | January 18, 2006 |
| 3 | Hikaru's Mission | February 1, 2006 |
| 4 | A Fierce Fight | February 16, 2006 |
| 5 | Ryo's Experiment | March 2, 2006 |
| 6 | Training Day | March 16, 2006 |
| 7 | Dark Storm Rising | March 29, 2006 |
| 8 | Assault on the Gate | April 12, 2006 |
| 9 | The Blaze of Battle | April 26, 2006 |
| 10 | A Desperate Plan | May 10, 2006 |
| 11 | The Rescue | May 24, 2006 |
| 12 | All-Out Attack | June 12, 2006 |
| 13 | Assault on Robot H.Q. | June 22, 2006 |
| 14 | Uplink Alone | July 4, 2006 |
| 15 | Mobile Defense Tank in Action | July 18, 2006 |
| 16 | Into the Mountain | August 1, 2006 |
| 17 | Bridge Walker vs. White Lightning | August 16, 2006 |
| 18 | Beginning of the End | August 29, 2006 |
| 19 | Secret Strike | September 12, 2006 |
| 20 | The Fall of Takeshi | September 26, 2006 |
| 21 | Battle in the Sky | October 10, 2006 |
| 22 | Origin of Exo-Force | October 24, 2006 |
| 23 | Sensei's Secret | November 7, 2006 |
| 24 | Eyes of the Enemy | November 26, 2006 |
| 25 | The Final Battle | December 4, 2006 |
| 26 | Epilogue | December 20, 2006 |
| 27 | Quest for the Golden City | January 26, 2007 |
| 28 | Mystery of the Codes | February 28, 2007 |
| 29 | A New Battle Begins | March 27, 2007 |
| 30 | Destination: Golden City | April 15, 2007 |
| 31 | Golden City Under Siege | May 13, 2007 |
| 32 | Battle for the Golden Tower | June 27, 2007 |
| 33 | A Trap is Sprung | July 29, 2007 |
| 34 | In the Blaze of Battle | September 6, 2007 |
| 35 | Aero Assault | September 26, 2007 |
| 36 | Betrayal | October 17, 2007 |
| 37 | Chaos in the Golden City | November 20, 2007 |
| 38 | Devastation | December 3, 2007 |
| 39 | Jungle Mission | March 26, 2008 |

== Books ==
=== Chapter books ===
Between 2006 and 2008, a series of Exo-Force chapter books written by Greg Farshtey was published by Scholastic. This chapter book series was cancelled in late 2007 apparently because of poor sales, thus the last two books on the list below were never released.

| # | Name | ISBN | Release date |
|---|---|---|---|
| 1 | Escape From Sentai Mountain | ISBN 978-0439828086 | September 2006 |
| 2 | Attack of the Robots | ISBN 978-0439828093 | December 2006 |
| 3 | Search for the Golden City | ISBN 978-1435236912 | March 2007 |
| 4 | Ghost of the Past | ISBN 978-0439923262 | June 2007 |
| 5 | Race to the Golden City | ISBN 978-0439923286 | September 2007 |
| 6 | The Golden Doom | ISBN 978-0545007115 | Unreleased |
| 7 | Jungle of Danger | ISBN 978-0545007030 | Unreleased |

=== Other ===
| Name | ISBN | Release Date |
|---|---|---|
| Play-Along Sticker Storybook | ISBN 978-0439828109 | September 1, 2006 |
| Collector's Guide | ISBN 978-0439828116 | March 1, 2007 |
| Activity Book | ISBN 978-0439923279 | June 1, 2007 |
| Action Manual | ISBN 978-0439923293 | September 2007 |

== Television commercials ==
The Lego Group developed a series of long-format commercials composed of two-minute episodes that aired on Nickelodeon and Nicktoons during late January 2006.

| Title | Airdate |
|---|---|
| Legend of Sentai Mountain | January 23, 2006 |
| Best of Human Exo-Force! | January 24, 2006 |
| Harsh Training of Exo-Force?! | January 25, 2006 |
| Failure of Exo-Force! | January 26, 2006 |
| War Starts...! | January 27, 2006 |

== Games ==
The following are the Exo-Force games previously available at the official LEGO website:

- Shot Session
- Smack Session
- Speed Session
- Sentai Showdown Battle 1
- Sentai Showdown Battle 2
- Sentai Showdown Battle 3
- Jungle Mission

== See also ==
- Lego Ninjago
- Lego Legends of Chima
- Bionicle
- Nexo Knights
- Lego Monkie Kid
- Lego Overwatch
- Lego Avatar
