= Jens Nygaard Knudsen =

Danish toy designer (1942–2020)

- Knudsen, c. 2009
- Born: January 25, 1942; Denmark
- Died: February 19, 2020 (aged 78); Hvide Sande, Denmark
- Occupation: Toy designer
- Employer: The Lego Group
- Known for: Inventing the Lego minifigure
- Children: 3

Jens Nygaard Knudsen (25 January 1942 – 19 February 2020) was a Danish toy designer. He was a longtime chief designer at Lego, best known as the inventor of the yellow Lego minifigure (also known as "minifigs").

== Biography ==
Knudsen applied for a job at Lego in Billund in 1968. Initially, he built hundreds of Lego model cars, some of which were later sold as commercial sets. During the 1970s, Lego underwent significant expansion and introduced various themed sets many of which designed by Knudsen, including themes of the early Legoland and sets like Lego Castle and Lego Space.

As Lego's design team grew and was split into specialized subgroups, Knudsen objected, preferring to design independently. It was during this period that he began developing the Lego minifigure with movable arms and legs, which was patented in 1978. In 1979, a space-themed set featuring the new figures was named "European Toy of the Year" at the Nuremberg International Toy Fair.

The minifigures became a major commercial success. By 2020, more than eight billion had been produced. Due to their popularity, Lego hired an additional 500 employees, and Knudsen was promoted to chief designer. He retired in 2000 but continued working with Lego figures, sometimes as a freelancer, mostly for personal enjoyment.

Knudsen was married and had three children. He died on 19 February 2020 at the Anker Fjord Hospice in Hvide Sande at the age of 78 from the nerve cell disease amyotrophic lateral sclerosis (ALS).
