= Mr. Gold (minifigure) =

Rare Lego minifigure produced in 2013

- Type: Lego minifigure
- Inception: 2013
- Manufacturer: The Lego Group
- Available: No
- Last production year: 2013

Mr. Gold is a rare Lego minifigure that debuted in Series 10 of the Collectible Minifigures line of blind bag sets. Only 5,000 copies were produced. As a result, the minifigure has been sold for very high prices, often in the thousands, during online auctions. Each minifigure came with a unique number, allowing those who had found a copy to register it on Lego.com. He appeared as a character in the video game Lego Brawls.
