= Lego Rock Raiders (video game) =

1999 video game

- Developer: Data Design Interactive
- Publisher: Lego Media
- Director: Eamonn Barr
- Producers: Tomas Gillo; David Upchurch (PS)
- Designers: Karl White; David Allen
- Programmers: Tony Stoddart; Rob Wilson; Steve Deacon (PS)
- Artist: Rob Dorney
- Composers: John Saull; Jon Harrison; Joseph Harper
- Platforms: Windows, PlayStation
- Release: Windows; 18 November 1999; PlayStation; UK: 10 December 1999; NA: 16 August 2000
- Genres: Real-time strategy (PC), action (PS)
- Modes: Single-player, multiplayer (PS only)

Lego Rock Raiders is a 1999 Lego-themed video game developed by Data Design Interactive and published by Lego Media for Microsoft Windows and PlayStation. It is based on the Lego theme of the same name. The Windows version was released in November 1999, while a differently built game for PlayStation was released in December 1999 in Europe and in August 2000 in North America.

== Gameplay ==
=== Windows version ===
The Windows version is a real-time strategy game similar to Dungeon Keeper, and was the first video game for the Rock Raiders theme. The game opens with optional training missions and one actual mission unlocked. Most missions require the player to collect a certain amount of Energy Crystals, the required amount starts low but gradually gets higher in later missions. Some missions require the player to locate Rock Raiders that have been trapped in landslides, or to find certain pieces of equipment and bring it back to their base. One of the game's features is the Priority Menu. With this menu, the player can set what order Rock Raiders carry out their tasks. For example, the player can set whether Rock Raiders should collect Energy Crystals or Lego Ore first.

At the end of each mission, Chief evaluates the player's work, examining various aspects of the mission. With all these taken into consideration, Chief gives a mission rating percentage.

There are twenty-five missions total, each of them is in either a rock, lava/volcanic or ice cavern environment. It is not necessary to complete every mission with 100%, or even complete all the missions, to complete the campaign, however, the player will unlock a "better" ending cutscene by completing the campaign in full.

=== PlayStation version ===
Unlike the Windows version, the PlayStation version is an action and strategy game, in which the player controls a character instead of just commanding a squad. While the former was centered on constructing a base and mining, the latter centers on exploring.

Most missions require the player to collect a certain amount of Energy Crystals, while some missions require the player to rescue Rock Raiders that have been trapped by landslides. There are eighteen campaign missions, and six multiplayer missions, all completely different between the North American (NTSC) and European (PAL) versions of the game. The PAL version also includes three bonus missions that are accessible after the campaign is completely finished, and eighteen multiplayer missions largely reusing levels from the main campaign. Rather than a percentage, at the end of each mission you receive either a bronze medal (minimum required objectives complete), a silver medal (most objectives complete), or a gold medal (all objectives complete in the required time).

== Development ==
Originally, the PlayStation version was going to be a real-time strategy game like the PC version. However, about six months before it was submitted to Sony, Lego Media told the developers to turn it into an action game instead, believing that real-time strategy games didn't work well on consoles.

When it was submitted, Sony Computer Entertainment America felt it did not meet their standards and asked for changes, which delayed the NTSC release until August 2000. This included replacing all the levels with new ones that were developed by another studio, Gameworld 7. Sony Computer Entertainment Europe, however, approved it, and it was released in PAL regions in 1999.

== Reception ==
Reception

Aggregate score
Aggregator	Score	
Aggregator	PC	PS
GameRankings	65%	59%

Review scores
Publication	Score	
Publication	PC	PS
AllGame	N/A	4/5
Computer Games Strategy Plus	4/5	N/A
EP Daily	N/A	3.5/10
Game Informer	N/A	1.5/10
GameSpot	6.1/10	3.2/10
IGN	6/10	6/10
PlayStation Official Magazine – UK	N/A	6/10
Official U.S. PlayStation Magazine	N/A	1/5
PC Gamer (UK)	71%	N/A
PC Games (DE)	72%	N/A
PC Zone	44%	N/A

The game received mixed reviews on both platforms according to the review aggregation website GameRankings.
