= Lego Rock Raiders =

Lego theme

- Subject: Mining, Subterranea
- Availability: 1999–2000
- Total sets: 15

Lego Rock Raiders is a discontinued Lego theme focused on mining equipment that released in 1999 and 2000. It was the only underground-based Lego theme before Lego Power Miners. The theme, while short-lived, featured sixteen construction sets and numerous story-related media, including three books and a video game.

== Overview ==
Lego Rock Raiders was a short-lived Lego theme that lasted for two years. It was launched in 1999 and discontinued in 2000. Despite this short lifespan, the theme introduced an elaborate storyline that was delivered through video games and comics. The storyline centered on the crew of the spaceship the LMS Explorer and their search for energy crystals. The toy sets were all set on an alien planet. The storyline involved the Rock Raiders' spaceship being sucked through a wormhole into a distant galaxy. The crew must then mine for energy crystals but in the process must also face territorial Rock Monsters. In 2009, the Power Miners theme was launched, which despite not being set in an alien galaxy, had similarities to the Rock Raiders theme by focusing on a group of miners.

=== Characters ===
Chief

There are six characters in the Lego Rock Raiders theme.

- Axle – The Rock Raiders' best driver, he has been seen to be somewhat impulsive and tends to dive headfirst into a dangerous situation, though he is very capable of defending himself. Axle is happiest when he is driving the Chrome Crusher, the Rock Raiders' largest land vehicle. His ability to handle anything with wheels is second to none; he has won the Lego World Racing Champion award three times, making him one of the fastest in the galaxy.
- Bandit – The Rock Raiders' greatest sailor, he is happiest when cruising the underground lakes and rapids on the Rapid Rider. He is also the Rock Raiders' head navigator, he always knows his exact location. After spending so much time underwater and on the Rapid Rider, he tends to be a little shaky on land.
- Chief – The oldest, wisest and most experienced Rock Raider. He is calm in any situation and has the experience to solve almost any problem. Chief captains the LMS Explorer, from which he commands his team, and is always ready to teleport them out if something goes wrong in a cavern. Years ago he lost his left arm while rescuing miners from a cave-in on Pluto; it was replaced with a mechanical arm, capable of shooting plasma blasts. Chief has never left the LMS Explorer in twenty years, he loves it so much that he has made it his home. He is rumored to have encountered a rock monster in his youth.
- Docs – The Rock Raiders' head Geologist and Commander. Docs is a very calm person, and fully assesses a situation, covering every possible plan, though sometimes he spends too much time thinking.
- Jet – The most courageous and strong-willed of all the Rock Raiders, she is a very skilled pilot and is always ready to take on new, exciting challenges. She is ready for any challenge she always approaches her missions with a level head.
- Sparks – An expert on all things mechanical and electrical, though unfortunately he is also very clumsy. He is always taking things apart, but sometimes he forgets to put them back together. He is credited with designing most of the Rock Raiders’ equipment.

== Construction sets ==
The Lego Rock Raiders theme featured fifteen Lego sets in total. Eight main sets were released in 1999, while seven smaller ones were released in 2000. First editions of the 1999 sets included promotional mini comic books. Four of the sets released in 2000 were promotional sets sold by Kabaya Foods Corporation.

Reference	Name	Released	Minifigures	Pieces	Notes
4910	Hover Scout	1999	Jet	39	
4920	Rapid Rider	1999	Bandit	38	
4930	Rock Raiders Crew	1999	Axle, Bandit, Docs, Jet, Sparks	38	
4940	Granite Grinder	1999	Axle	108	
4950	Loader-Dozer	1999	Axle, a rock monster	89	
4970	Chrome Crusher	1999	Axle	167	Requires two AAA batteries for "laser"
4980	Tunnel Transport	1999	Docs, Jet	341	
4990	Rock Raiders HQ	1999	Bandit, Docs, Jet, Sparks, a rock monster	402	Requires two AAA batteries for "laser"
1274	1 Light Hover	2000	Jet	25	Released by Kabaya in Japan only
1275	2 Chain Dozer	2000	Bandit	22	Released by Kabaya in Japan only
1276	3 Heli Transporter	2000	Docs	20	Released by Kabaya in Japan only
1277	4 Drill Craft	2000	Sparks	27	Released by Kabaya in Japan only
3347	Rock Raiders #1	1999	Chief	8	Part of the Mini Heroes Collection line, includes a display stand and collectible card for each minifigure
3348	Rock Raiders #2	1999	Bandit, Docs, Sparks	21	Part of the Mini Heroes Collection line, includes a display stand and collectible card for each minifigure
3349	Rock Raiders #3	1999	Axle, Docs, Jet	24	Part of the Mini Heroes Collection line, includes a display stand and collectible card for each minifigure
3916	Rock Raider Key Chain	2000	Jet	1	Keychain

== Books and comics ==
Three books and a number of comics about the Lego Rock Raiders theme were published.

- Rock Raiders: An Interactive Puzzle Storybook – An illustrated storybook published in 1999 by Dorling Kindersley, every scene in the book is accompanied by a puzzle relating to something a character said or saw, with solutions to the puzzles in the back of the book. Written by Anna Knight, illustrated by Roger Harris.
- Rock Raiders: High Adventure Deep Underground – A graphic novel published in 2000 by Lego Systems Inc. The novel told, in Jet's point-of-view and in greater detail, the events on Planet U. There are a few puzzles on certain pages. Written by Alan Grant, illustrated by Robin Smith and Lego Media.
- Race for Survival – A short novel published by Dorling Kindersley in 2000, aimed at kids in Grades 2–4. At the side of each page is a small article on Geology. The story takes place six months after the events in the other books and the video games. Written by Marie Birkinshaw, illustrated by Roger Harris.

There were also small promotional mini comic books included with specially marked, first edition releases of the main eight Lego Rock Raiders sets from 1999.

=== Video games ===
A real-time strategy video game of the same name as the theme was developed by Data Design Interactive and released for Microsoft Windows in November 1999. An action-adventure PlayStation game, also of the same name, was released in Europe a month later and in North America under a year later.

== Original plans ==
Early Rock Raiders concept art

The Ultimate Lego Book contained concept art for Lego Rock Raiders on pages 30–31, showing how the theme developed over time. The original plans were vastly different:

- Different outfit designs for the Rock Raiders, with goggles and scarfs.
- Mysterious aliens traveling with the Rock Raiders.
- Rock monsters were larger, and some had tails and acted more like animals.
- The Chrome Crusher appears with two drills (similar to its upgraded form in the video game) and no laser.
- The Loader-Dozer has a drill and a gun.
- A scrapped flying rocket-like vehicle which somewhat resembles the Tunnel Scout.
- A scrapped vehicle with robotic arms, a drill and laser turrets.
- A mobile Rock Raiders HQ, with crystal and ore Refineries and giant arms.
- A Hover Scout with cargo capacity.

== See also ==
- Lego Power Miners
