= Lego Duplo =

Lego theme for toddlers

- The logo since 2022
- Other names: Lego Preschool; Explore
- Availability: 1969–present
- Total sets: 1,294
- Official website

Lego Duplo (trademarked as DUPLO and stylised in the logo as duplo) is a core product range of the construction toy Lego by The Lego Group, designed for children from 1 1/2 to 5 years old. Duplo bricks are twice the size of traditional Lego bricks in each of their three dimensions, making them easier to handle and less likely to be swallowed and choked on by younger children. Despite their size, they are still compatible with traditional Lego bricks.

Initially launched in 1969, the Duplo range has expanded since then to include sets with figures, animals, cars, houses, and trains. Duplo products are manufactured in Nyíregyháza, Hungary.

== Development ==
Before its introduction in 1969, The Lego Group investigated ways to produce safe, age-appropriate Lego bricks that were larger than traditional bricks to target young children aged one-and-a-half to five years. The company initially struggled to find a scale that would fit with the existing Lego System in Play, exploring 3:1 and 4:1 scales, but eventually settled on a 2:1 scale. In 1968, second-generation owner Godtfred Kirk Christiansen provided the idea of hollowing out the studs on the Duplo bricks to make them compatible with the system. Duplo is derived from the Latin word duplex 'double'.

== History ==
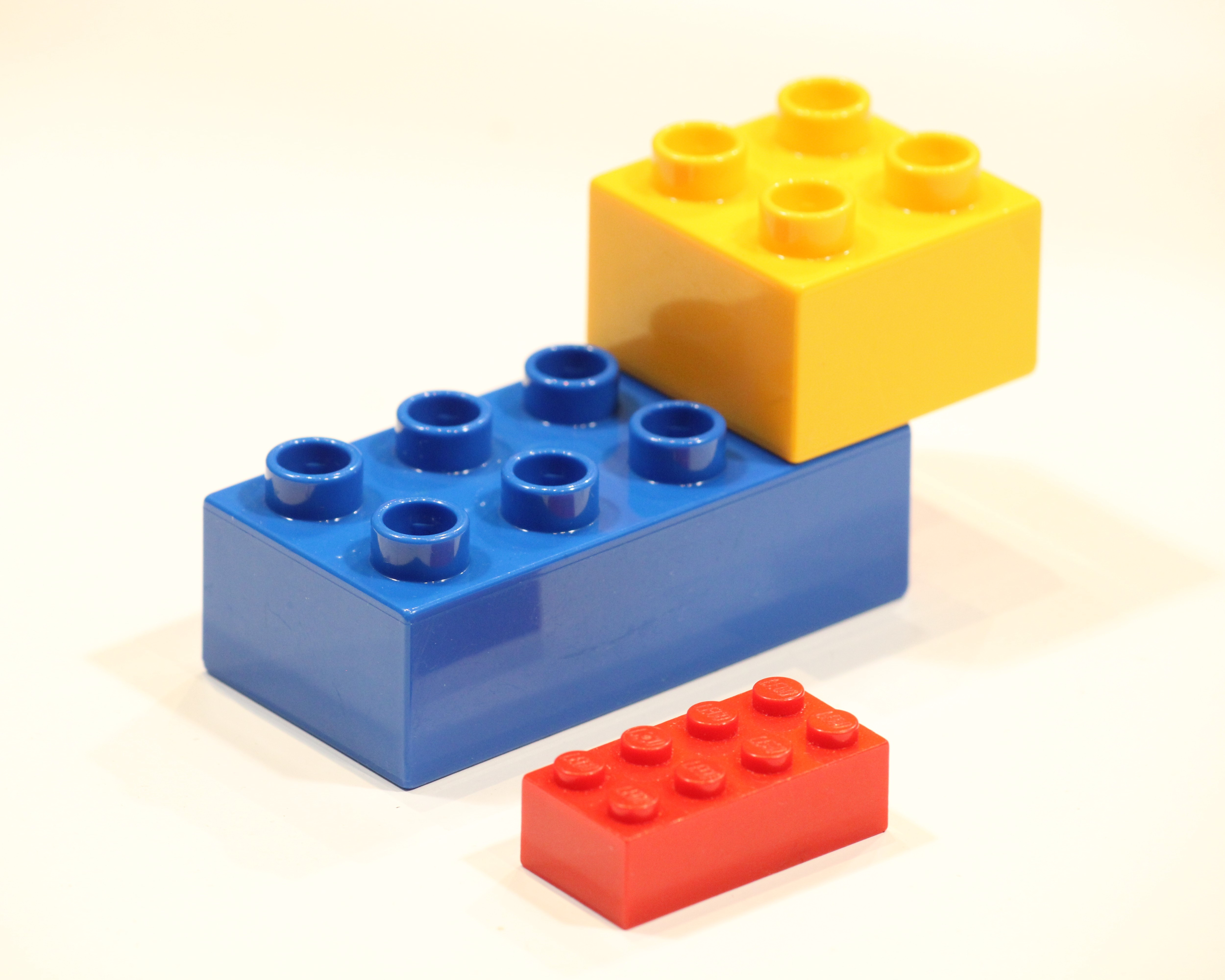
Duplo bricks alongside a smaller red regular-sized Lego brick

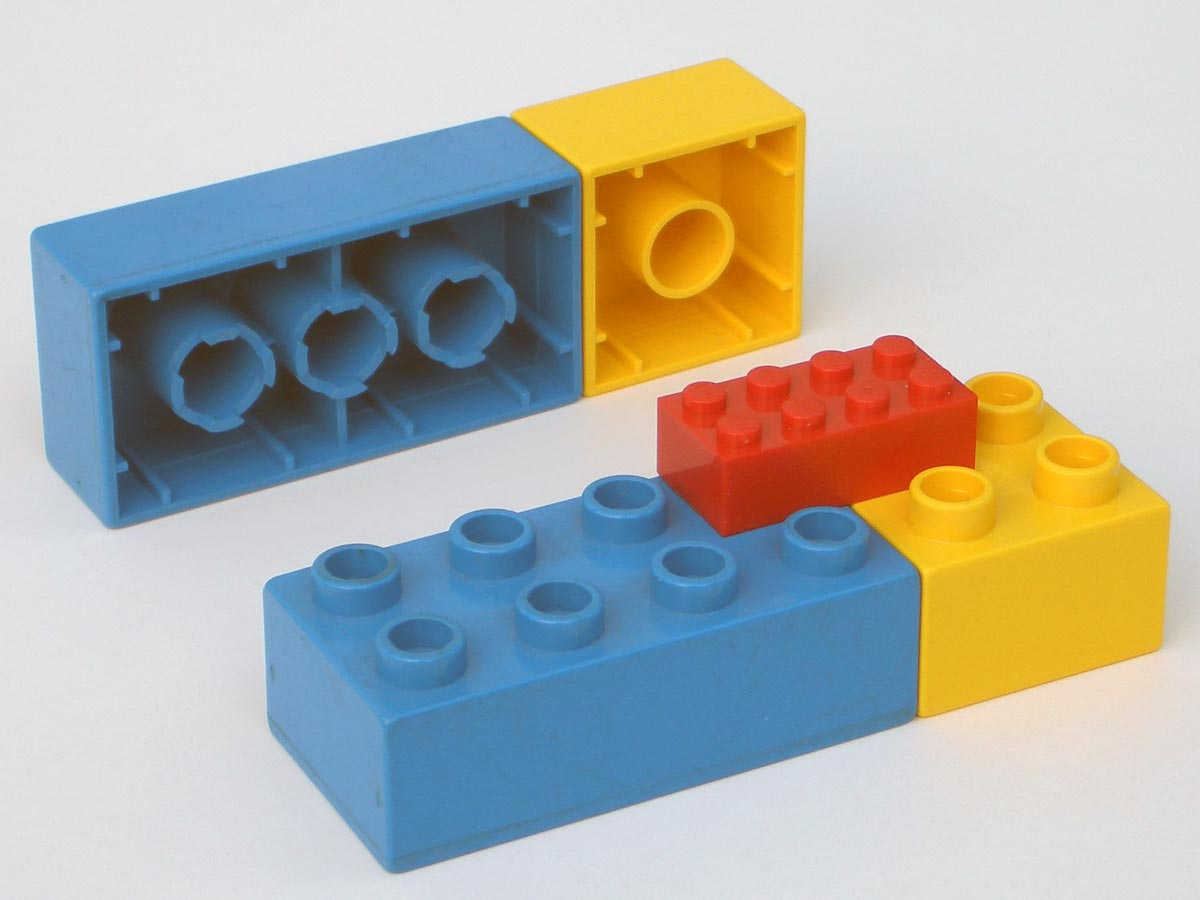
Duplo and regular-sized Lego compatibility demonstrated

Duplo bricks were introduced in 1969, in four colours: red, yellow, blue, and white. The following year, two more sets were added with blue and red wheel plates. In the product catalogue for 1971, the sets were described as being for children from 1 to 2 years but were still sold mixed with Lego bricks, normally designed for ages 3 to 12. In 1972, the Duplo brick with two rows of two studs was introduced.

In 1975, Duplo became its product brand, with five sets made up exclusively of Duplo bricks. New additions included a round-topped two-by-two stud brick and a small four-wheeled wagon with two rows of six studs. With these new Duplo sets, Lego began targeting children 1 1/2 years old with the intention that when the children became older, their Duplo bricks could be used together with regular Lego bricks.

In 1977, the Duplo name was dropped in favour of Lego Preschool. Small figures the size of two-by-two bricks were introduced, made up of a cylindrical head and a tapered, limbless body, similar in design to Fisher-Price's Little People. Another new brick was a half arch. The new sets included figures, doors, and two-by-six brick wagons that could act as a car or train.

The name Duplo was brought back in 1979, along with a new reworked logo. Some brick sets were sold inside a plush version of the rabbit from the logo, that zipped closed.

In 1983, other Duplo figures appeared, often called Duplo people. These figures have moveable heads, arms, and legs and look like large Lego minifigures, but cannot be taken apart, making them safer for small children. Also in 1983, set number 2700 was introduced with a model of a steam engine with two train cars. In 1986, a Duplo doll house with sliding doors was introduced. This included a Duplo people mother, father, and smaller child.

In 1992, Duplo Toolo was introduced, which was a range of construction sets using screwdrivers and was aimed at children between the ages of three and six.

1993 brought a grey rail train system with a stop-and-start track. Later, two more train systems arrived. In 2005, Lego started selling Duplo trains themed after Thomas & Friends.

In 1995, Duplo Primo was launched, which was a line aimed at children aged between 6 and 24 months. Most of the products in this line were not construction toys. Duplo Primo was later renamed Lego Primo.

The name Duplo was dropped again in favour of Explore in 2002. The new brand name was used to emphasise the relationship between the bricks and the child's learning. Explore introduced four different ways of exploring play: explore being me; explore together; explore imagination and explore logic. In the 2004 spring catalogue, there was a reminder that Duplo was now called Explore, but that fall the well-known Duplo name was back yet again with a new rabbit logo designed to match the new elephant logo for the Lego Quatro range.

Lego has made Duplo sets licensed with Bob the Builder and Thomas & Friends characters. Those Duplo ranges have been discontinued, but Duplo sets now include farm, zoo, town, castle, and pirate lines. As of 2008 a doll house and princess castle are available. Some Duplo sets have cars, trucks, and buildings which cannot be disassembled. Some DUPLO sets do not include building manuals.

== Production ==
Lego Duplo is manufactured at a factory in Nyíregyháza, Hungary. Over 90% of all Duplo elements are manufactured at the plant, alongside traditional Lego bricks. Csaba Tóth, Communications Director, commented, "Every year, about 14 million Duplo boxes come out of the Nyíregyháza factory. For this, we inject 2 million Duplo cubes and Duplo parts a day".

== Other media ==
In 1995, Lego Duplo was the sponsor of the British children's preschool television series Tots TV on Children's ITV.

In 2014, Lego Duplo made an appearance in The Lego Movie, as aliens built from Duplo bricks that threaten the citizens of Bricksburg. They reappear in the 2019 sequel, The Lego Movie 2: The Second Part, as the same alien invaders, with the story picking up from the events of the previous film.

== Theme park attraction ==
In March 2020, a new theme park attraction was announced at Legoland Windsor Resort. The Duplo Dino Coaster was introduced as part of Duplo Valley, an area of the park designed for children aged five and under. The area also includes Duplo Valley Airport, which involves fully controllable helicopters.

== Reception ==
In October 2019, Lego Duplo World was launched, which is an educational game app that was designed to help children between the ages of two and five reach their key learning goals. It was developed by StoryToys in partnership with The Lego Group. The app has won several awards, including a 2020 Licensing International Award, a 2020 KAPI award at the Consumer Electronics Show in Las Vegas, a 2021 Notable Children's Digital Media award from the American Library Association and a 2021 Kidscreen Award for Best Learning App (branded).

== Awards and nominations ==
In 2009, Feeding Zoo (set number: 5634) was awarded "DreamToys" in the Construction category by the Toy Retailers Association.

In 2019, Submarine Adventure! (set number: 10910) was awarded "DreamToys" in the Trains, Planes and Automobiles category by the Toy Retailers Association.

== See also ==
- Fisher-Price
- Lego Juniors
- Little Tikes
- Playskool
- Free Universal Construction Kit – 3D-printable open source construction toy
