= Lego Power Miners =

2009 Lego product

Power Miners
- Subject: Mining and underground monsters
- Availability: 2009–2010
- Total sets: 24
- Official website

Lego Power Miners is a discontinued product-range of the construction toy Lego, themed around a team of "Power Miners" who, while investigating the cause of a series of severe earthquakes, discover Rock Monsters and Energy Crystals. The theme was originally released in 2009 after the discontinued Lego Rock Raiders theme. The product line was discontinued by the end of 2010.

== Overview ==
The Power Miners (Doc, Duke, Rex, and Brains) are sent underground by the government to investigate a series of earthquakes that have destroyed several cities on the surface of the Lego World. While underground, they discover Energy Crystals and the Rock Monsters (Meltrox, Boulderax, Glaciator, Sulfurix, Firox, Geolix and Tremorox). They attempt to collect and mine the crystals in order to stop the monsters from consuming them and causing the earthquakes on the surface. However, a bigger threat emerges in the form of the Crystal King, the undisputed ruler of all Rock Monsters underground.

In January 2010, a new sub-theme called Power Miners: Core of the Underworld was introduced, with the plot having the Power Miners collapse to a lower level of caves while fighting the Crystal King with the Titanuim Command Rig, finding themselves in the inner core of the earth and encounter the Lava Monsters (Firax, Combustix, Infernox, and Eruptorr).

== Construction sets ==
According to BrickLink, The Lego Group released 24 playsets and promotional polybags as part of the Lego Power Miners theme. The product line was eventually discontinued by the end of December 2010.

Below is a list of Power Miners sets. The first two promotional sets were released in December 2008, but later in the year a few of the first wave sets were available at Toys "R" Us stores. Finally, in January 2009, the entire first wave was released. A second batch of sets was released in May 2009 and a third wave of sets in August 2009. All four new sets of 2010 were released in January 2010 to Europe, while sets 8190 and 8191 were not released to America until August 2010. Most of the sets were similar to the Lego Rock Raiders theme.

Reference	Name	Released	Pieces	Notes
8907	Rock Hacker	2008	29	Limited promotional release
8908	Monster Launcher	2008	12	Limited promotional release
8956	Stone Chopper	2009	31	
8957	Mine Mech	2009	67	
8958	Granite Grinder	2009	97	
8959	Claw Digger	2009	197	
8960	Thunder Driller	2009	235	
8961	Crystal Sweeper	2009	474	
8707	Boulder Blaster	2009	293	Limited edition
8962	Crystal King	2009	168	
8963	Rock Wrecker	2009	225	
8708	Cave Crusher	2009	259	Special edition
8964	Titanium Command Rig	2009	706	
8709	Underground Mining Station	2009	637	Limited edition
8188	Fire Blaster	2010	67	
8189	Magma Mech	2010	183	
8190	Claw Catcher	2010	259	
8191	Lavatraz	2010	381	

== Awards and nominations ==
In 2009, Titanium Command Rig was awarded "DreamToys" in the Construction category by the Toy Retailers Association.

== See also ==
- Lego Rock Raiders
