= Lego Mars Mission =

Lego theme

- Subject: Mars Exploration
- Availability: 2007–2009
- Characters: Astronaut; Alien; Alien Commander

Lego Mars Mission is a discontinued Lego subtheme to Lego Space that sold from 2007 to 2009. It is set on Mars and features astronauts, aliens, and high-tech machinery.

== Sets ==
Year	Name	Number	Pieces
2007	MB-01 Eagle Command Base	7690	760
2007	ETX Alien Mothership Assault	7691	434
2007	MX-71 Recon Dropship	7692	435
2007	ETX Alien Strike	7693	246
2007	MT-31 Trike	7694	95
2007	MX-11 Astro Fighter	7695	57
2007	MT-51 Claw-Tank Ambush	7697	374
2007	MT-101 Armored Drilling Unit	7699	635
2008	Mini-Robot	5616	24
2008	Alien Jet	5617	21
2008	Crystal Hawk	5619	26
2008	MX-81 Hypersonic Operations Aircraft	7644	795
2008	MT-61 Crystal Reaper	7645	600
2008	ETX Alien Infiltrator	7646	333
2008	MX-41 Switch Fighter	7647	235
2008	MT-21 Mobile Mining Unit	7648	130
2008	MT-201 Ultra-Drill Walker	7649	759

== Video games ==
CrystAlien Conflict was a 2007 real-time strategy web browser game based on the Mars Mission vehicles and sets. The player could build and command either astronaut or alien units and structures through a short series of levels. The game was playable on the official website until 2010, after the discontinuation of the theme.

Sets and characters from Mars Mission appear in the Space and Alien stories of Lego Battles.

== Related books ==
- Space Adventures (Reader): Mars Alien Attack!. Scholastic Inc. 2008. ISBN 978-0-545-08219-8.
