= Lego Baby =

Lego theme for babies and toddlers

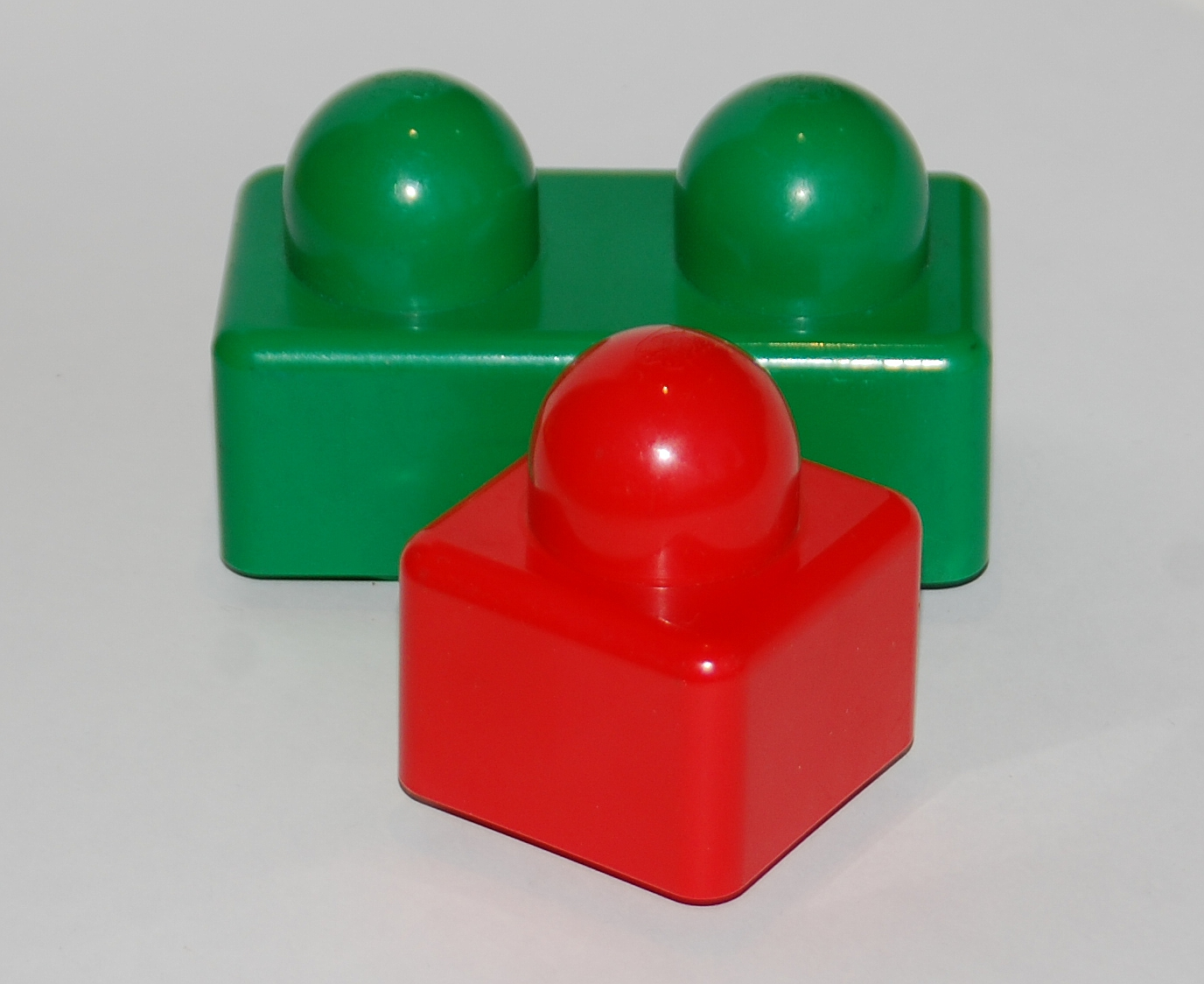
- Lego Baby bricks
- Subject: Various
- Availability: 1995–2005
- Total sets: 48 Lego Baby and 61 Lego Primo

Lego Baby is a discontinued line by the Lego Group of bricks and other elements for young children of 6 to 18 months. The line was intended for babies who are too young to play with regular Lego Duplo bricks (1–5 years). The Lego baby bricks are larger to prevent babies from swallowing them.

The bricks' compatibility with other Lego elements is fairly minimal. Regular Lego bricks of the same length and width can be attached to the bottom of the bricks and adapter pieces are also available.

The range has expanded to include sets among others with figures, animals, trains, toys making sound, baby walkers, general baby toys and products made of textile.

== Overview ==
In September 1995 the line was introduced under the name Duplo Primo. The first four sets were #2080, #2082, #2084 and #2086. From 1997 the line was sold under the name Lego Primo, with a yellow elephant logo. The line was extended with 10 new sets. In 1999 the age indication changed from 6–18 months to 3–36 months.

The Primo name was dropped after 1999 because it was feared to have a negative association with the word "preemie", which is a term that refers to medically fragile babies born before 36 weeks gestation. As a result of the negative connotation surrounding the term, Lego rebranded Primo as Lego Baby in 2000. New sets included sets made with textiles. In 2001 the company produced a few licensed sets including Mickey Mouse, in cooperation with The Walt Disney Company.

In 2002, a big difference appeared. The Lego Baby line had been combined with Lego Duplo line to make 'Lego Explore. Already in 2003 it became clear that people didn't recognise Lego Explore as Lego Duplo or Lego Baby. At the beginning of 2004, there came special notices that a set included Duplo elements.

Mid-2004, Lego revived the Lego Baby line. Several new sets were launched and the line got a teddy bear logo instead of the yellow elephant. The elephant that was used as the logo of the Primo brand, was used in blue for the Lego Quatro line from 2004.

Lego Baby was discontinued in 2006.

== See also ==
- Lego Quatro
- Lego Duplo
