= Lego Space =

Lego theme

- Sub‑themes: Futuron; Blacktron; M:Tron; Space Police; Ice Planet 2002; Spyrius; Unitron; Exploriens; Roboforce; UFO; Insectoids; Life on Mars; Mars Mission; Alien Conquest; Galaxy Squad
- Subject: Space warfare; Space exploration
- Availability: 1978–2013, 2024

Lego Space is a science fiction-oriented Lego theme which focuses on astronauts, space colonization, spaceships, and extraterrestrial life. Introduced in 1978, along with Castle and Town — with each theme representing the past (Castle), present (Town), and future (Space) — it is one of the oldest and most extensive themes in Lego history, consisting of over 300 individual sets.

== History ==
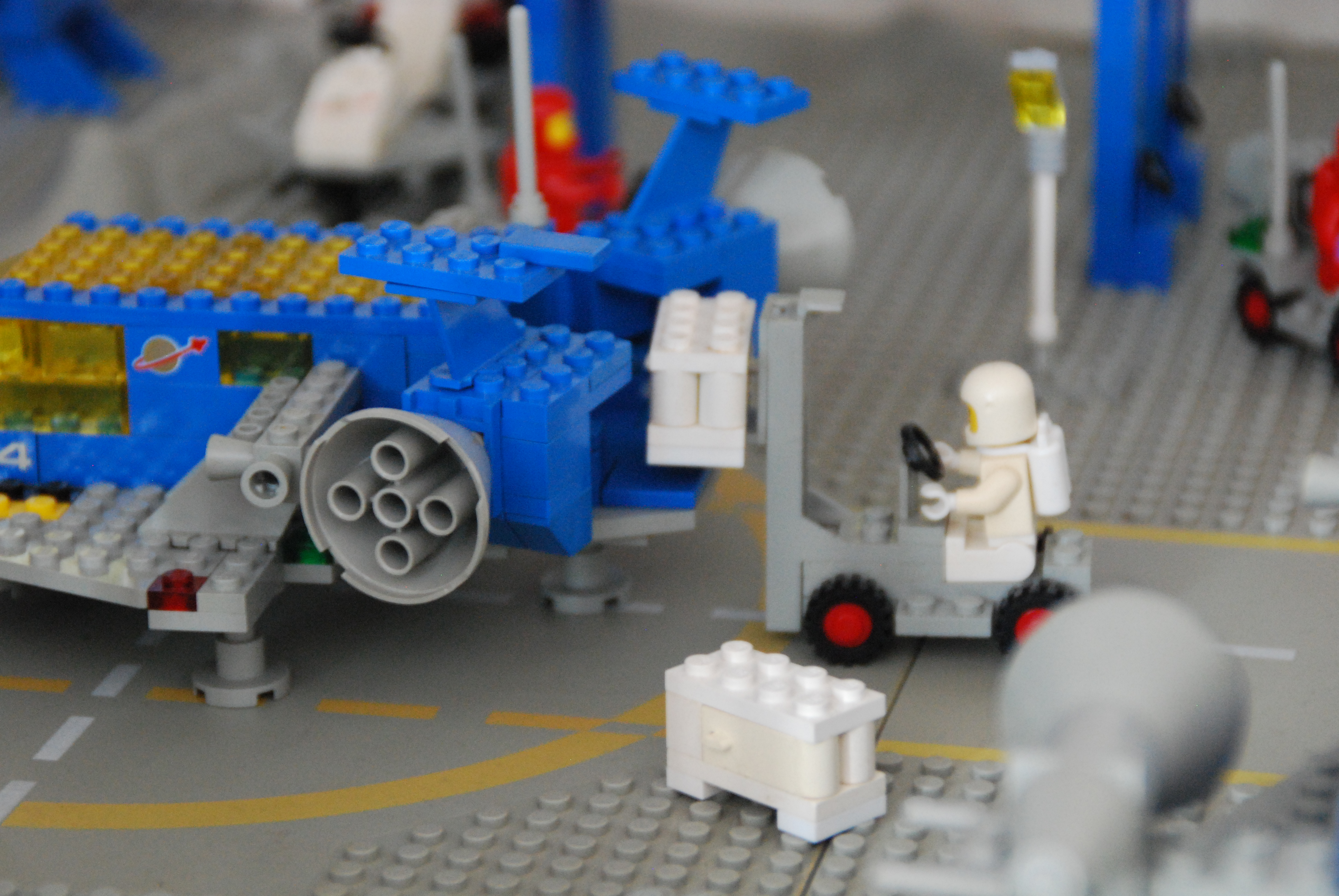
An example of Lego Space minifigures and vehicles

=== Early Space (1964–1973) ===
At least three Lego sets were released prior to the Anchor Space theme, predating the introduction of the standard Lego minifigure. Most Lego sets of this era were composed only of bricks in basic colors. Hence, the early Space sets had a limited color selection, and more specialized pieces had not yet been developed. Once Lego began producing individual themes in the 1970s, many new parts were created, and original pieces began appearing in new colors. Lego Space has been marketed and sold under the Legoland and Lego System banners.

=== "Classic" Space (1978–1987) ===
The "Classic" Space logo

The first Lego Space sets began an era of more complicated and less colorful designs with a heavy emphasis on space exploration. Many early space sets were primarily blue, grey, and white and included translucent yellow windscreens and blocks. Grey and transparent green were used for ground craft. Designs began using stacked plates rather than stacked bricks to create thinner elements.

In their earliest stages Space sets consisted only of ships and basic wheeled vehicles, but as the number of science-fiction-inspired designs grew, the basic pattern of ground-buggies, walking robots, spaceships, and bases developed. Sets were still simplistic and included minifigure pilots steering their spacecraft with steering wheels and rocket engines as simple cones affixed to fence pieces, visor-less helmets, and often no in-flight pilot protection other than a spacesuit. The first minifigures released in this theme in 1978 wore either a red or white spacesuit, with yellow space minifigures debuting a year later.

By the mid-1980s the color palette had shifted to predominantly white with a transparent blue theme, later used extensively in the Lego Futuron theme. Two new colors of space minifigures were introduced in black and blue uniforms. The first helmets had thin chin straps that would break easily. In 1983, the helmet with thicker chinstraps appeared, although they were still susceptible to breakage.

=== Futuron (1987–1990) ===
In 1987 Lego added "factions" to its space theme with the introduction of Blacktron, and the new subtheme based on space exploration was given the name "Futuron". The new line kept the logo aesthetic and the white and blue color scheme that were used in the later years of "Classic" Space but redesigned its minifigures. They came in four colors (red, blue, yellow, and black) and had a new design with a zipper crossing from hip to shoulder with the color above and white below. These figures also featured a newly redesigned helmet with a transparent blue visor. Instead of a large spaceship, the theme centered around the Monorail Transport System, which featured a battery-powered train and six metres (20 ft) of track. At the time, this was the most expensive Lego set.

=== Blacktron (1987–1988) ===
Blacktron, like Futuron, was one of the first unified subthemes in space. The set designs used a black and yellow color scheme, with transparent yellow windscreens and transparent red highlights. The Blacktron minifigures wore black jumpsuits similar to those worn by modern military pilots, with white trims and opaque black visors. Blacktron featured a large spacecraft, the "Renegade", which set the tone for all future large ships by splitting into a number of smaller modules, including a storage bin for a small, wheeled vehicle, which could be recombined not only with each other but also with modules from other vehicles in the theme, specifically the "Invader" and "Battrax". This modular interchangeability remained a staple of Lego Space until 2001.

=== Space Police (1989) ===
In 1989 Lego decided to further its storyline direction with the introduction of Space Police to oppose Blacktron since the themes of police and robbers were popular sellers in its Lego Town theme. The Space Police sets had a black, blue, and transparent red color scheme. The minifigures shared the torso design with the black Futuron minifigure but included a transparent red visor. This would be the first time that Lego had a "bad guy", "good guy", and "civilian" faction, a theme that would be used for the next decade. Space Police also used modular systems, but on a smaller scale, by featuring a Space Police jail cell that could be used interchangeably among almost all sets and came with a Blacktron occupant.

=== M:Tron (1990–1991) ===
In 1990 Lego introduced M:Tron, a theme of sets designed around magnets. After the introduction of Space Police, M:Tron was introduced as a repair and rescue faction, the space equivalent of a fire brigade. However, for the American market, the faction was depicted as a mining and exploration faction, adapting the names of the sets and the descriptions in the catalogs to reflect this. In catalog pictures and posters, the M:Tron are frequently seen helping Futuron and repairing their vehicles, and the Lego Idea Book 260 features instructions for what appears to be an M:Tron ambulance. The M:Tron theme vehicles are distinctive for their red hulls, grey and black trim, and transparent neon green canopies. They often featured crane-like attachments with magnets for picking up small cargo and toolboxes. These boxes were not interchangeable. The figures wore white trousers, a red shirt with an "M" logo in the middle, and a black helmet with a transparent neon green visor. This theme also extensively used brick-built robot figures (droids) to assist the M:Tron space minifigures. These were the last sets produced under the "Legoland" banner before Lego began branding their sets as Lego System.

=== Blacktron Future Generation (1991–1993) ===
In 1991 Blacktron was revived as Blacktron Future Generation (commonly called Blacktron II). The sets' color designs featured black with white trim and transparent neon green canopies, and the minifigures were redesigned with new uniforms and a new logo. It also replaced the widespread interchangeability of Blacktron I with mostly uniform cockpit globes, which could be switched unimpeded between ships in other sets within the theme. However, only four sets of eleven featured them (the Alpha Centauri Outpost, Spectral Starguider, Aerial Intruder, and the Allied Avenger). The last Blacktron II set (or group of sets), the Space Blacktron II Bundle Pack, was introduced in 1993.

=== Space Police II (1992–1993) ===
The following year Space Police was also revived, becoming Space Police II, to oppose the new Blacktron. The set designs featured black and grey with transparent green canopies and red trim. The jail cells from the original were retained, though only three vehicles could accept them. The theme also lacked a permanent installation like Space Police I's Space Lock-Up Isolation Base. It was the first Space theme to replace the standard Lego smiley face minifigure head with a more complex print (in this case, the face augmented by a fringe of hair and an ear-mounted microphone). Finally, Space Police II ships were known for being under-armed; several vehicles sported no overt weapons (such as the Galactic Chief, whose epaulette-wearing pilot is armed with only a hand-held blaster that might actually be a megaphone), and the others featured only two small cockpit-mounted weapons (including the theme's heavyweight multi-module spaceship, the Galactic Mediator).

=== Ice Planet 2002 (1993–1994) ===
In 1993 Ice Planet 2002 took over the civilian role from M:Tron. Based on exploration on an ice planet, sets were designed with skis (both on vehicles and personnel), a blue and white color scheme with transparent neon orange canopies, and transparent neon orange chainsaws. As befitting an icebound theme, most of its vehicles were ground-based, and many of its smaller vehicles also carried satellite dishes, seemingly to track or communicate with the rockets launched by the larger vehicles or their base. This was also the first space theme to have a named character (Commander Cold) and a female minifigure.

=== Spyrius (1994–1995) ===
In 1994 Spyrius replaced Blacktron II as the "bad" faction, with sets designed around spying and infiltration. The set designs were mostly red and black, with transparent blue canopies. Most spaceships in this theme were shaped like flying saucers, and the ground vehicles were designed like giant robots. The faction was often marketed as stealing technology from Unitron. This nine-set theme was the first to feature robot minifigures.

=== Unitron (1994–1995) ===
Also in 1994, Unitron took over the "good guy" role from the Space Police II. The Unitron theme revolved around a group dedicated to defending the galaxies from Spyrius while they explored the unknown reaches of space. Their base of operations had a large monorail system powered by a 9V battery. The four sets were designed in blue and grey with transparent blue canopies and transparent neon green highlights. It also retained Lego interchangeability in the form of small cockpits that could dock on the front or top of its vehicles. Except for the Monorail set, the theme was only released in the United States and Canada.

=== Exploriens (1996) ===
In 1996 Lego returned to the white and transparent blue canopies of Futuron with the Exploriens theme. Sets are known for using large, open structures and special image elements (e.g., as foil-holograph stickers for viewscreens). The Exploriens were searching, evidently, for fossils, and certain flat plates contained triple images: one in white, for the naked eye; one in blue, for viewing under transparent red scanners; and one in red, for viewing under transparent blue scanners. It was the second space theme to include a robot minifigure; some also considered this the second space theme to include a female minifigure, a feminine robot named Ann Droid. The android head was taken over by Spyrius. The theme shares many similarities with the popular Star Trek TV series, with the faction's main focus being on exploration, their robot figure's name being a play on "Android", and the faction's insignia resembling Starfleet's insignia.

=== Roboforce (1997) ===
In 1997, taking over the "good guy" role was another four-set theme, Roboforce. The sets featured numerous large robots in varying color schemes, run by similarly uniformed pilots. Neon Orange Class features humanoid robots equipped with a buzzsaw or a chainsaw. The "head" of each robot was also a small spaceship that could be used as an escape pod or secondary vehicle. The Neon Green Class featured animal-shaped robots. The Robo Raptor was the only set not to feature a spacecraft, while the Robo Master's small starcraft strongly resembled the Unitron Star Hawk II as a tribute to the fan favorite set. Roboforce "Robos" were powered by "secret" "robo disks", which were oddly enough rectangle-shaped power sources.

The theme was only released in North America.

=== UFO (1997–1998) ===
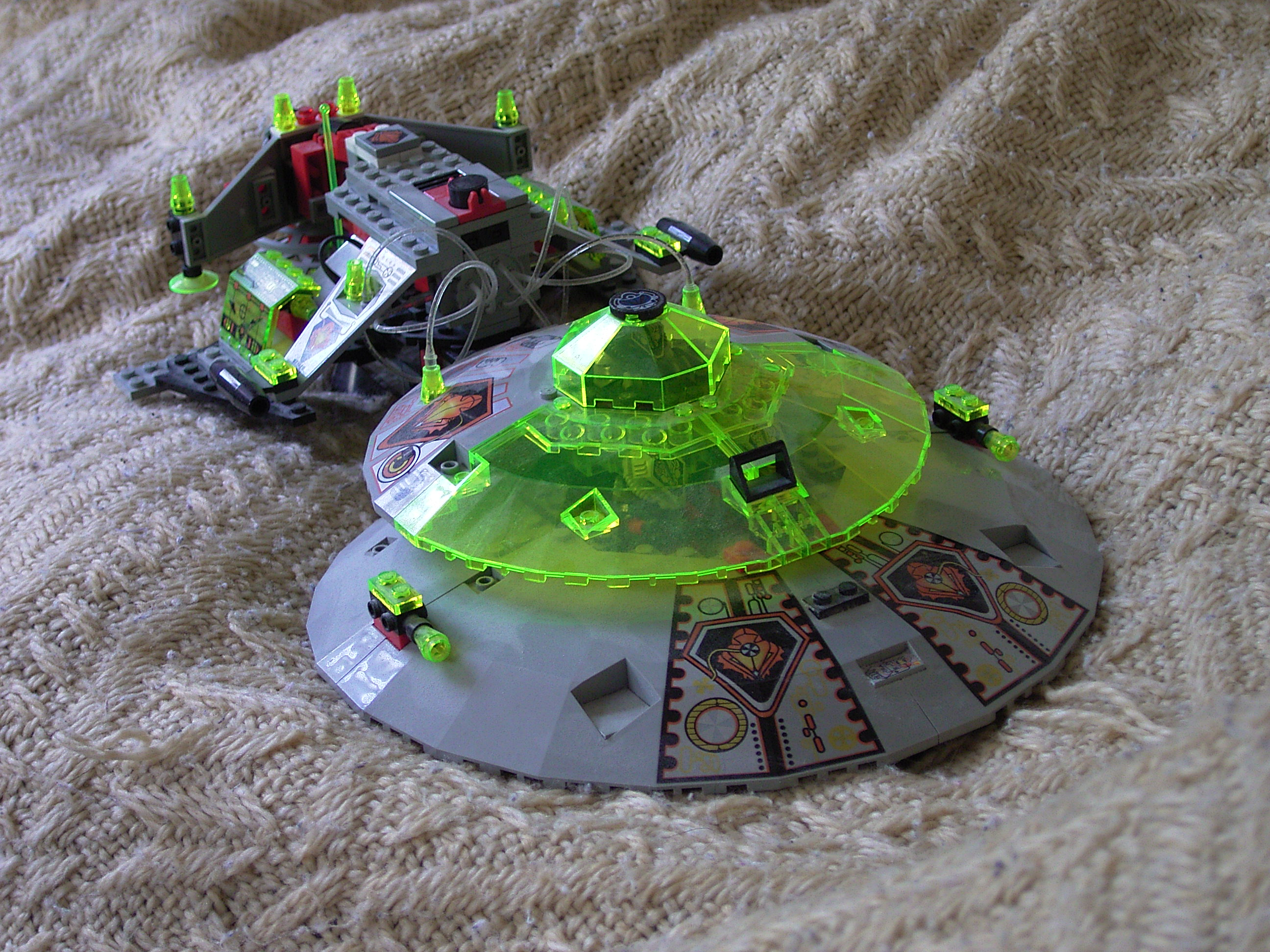
A Lego creation using pieces and colors from the UFO theme

UFO was the first Lego space theme to feature non-human-looking aliens. All of the UFO theme's minifigures were cybernetic in nature. They featured two wholly robotic figures. Many of its spaceships used saucers or half-saucers as elements befitting its name. It has the smallest proportion of wheeled ground vehicles to ships (two to nine) of any Lego Space theme before or since. The UFO theme is often considered the first space theme to heavily rely on large pieces meant to provide effects (such as curvature) that would be difficult to achieve with traditional Lego pieces, which became common over the next decade.

=== Insectoids (1998–1999) ===
The Insectoids theme featured robotic vehicles built to resemble giant insects. The theme included pieces with light and sound functions and magnets. The alien cyborg minifigures in Insectoids were Lego's second alien-looking race after those in UFO. While the theme's story varied between regions, it generally involved the theme's aliens landing on a planet filled with giant bugs and disguising themselves and their spaceships as bugs to survive and collect "energy orbs", which could be interacted with in the sets via their magnetic stickers.

=== Rock Raiders (1999–2000) ===
Rock Raiders is a theme released in 1999 which is all about mining.

The story is about a team of astronauts crashing on a seemingly barren planet after their ship is sucked into a wormhole and spit out in a faraway galaxy. When their ship crashes directly into the planet's crust, an event that resulted in all their fuel being lost, they realize they are stuck on this planet for the near future. In order to leave, they must fight dangerous creatures and dig up crystals that they can use to power their rocket.

The theme had almost all the gimmicks previous space themes had had, along with an interesting color scheme of old dark gray, teal, and yellow. The theme is often compared to Power Miners.

=== Life on Mars (2001) ===
Life on Mars is a space theme released in 2001, around a time of increased curiosity about the red planet. The theme revolved around the concept of lifeforms that could possibly exist on Mars.

This was the first theme to feature two types of minifigures: Martian aliens (native to Mars) and human astronauts. The sets depict peaceful coexistence between the two species on the planet Mars. The Life on Mars theme pioneered several unique aspects of Lego. It used a pneumatic pump system capable of sending Martian minifigures through tubes in the 7317 Aero Tube Hangar set. This system would later be seen in the Mars Mission theme, used to shoot missiles. The theme also introduced several new muted colors to the Lego color palette, including Sand Green, Sand Blue, Sand Red, and Sand Purple. Sets were designed to easily separate into segments to encourage children to mix and create their own unique vehicles out of human and alien sets. The humans had a white and blue color scheme, while the aliens had a variety of colors.

The Martians in the Life on Mars theme was unique in that they were named after real-life stars and constellations: Altair, Centauri, Antares, Canopus, Pollux, Vega, Arcturus, Cassiopeia, Mizar, and Rigel.

=== Mars Mission (2007–2008) ===
Mars Mission is the second Mars space theme to feature both humans and aliens and is a reboot of Life on Mars. Unlike Life on Mars, the aliens (an alien race from another planet) and humans were adversaries. Like with Life on Mars theme, this set is generally viewed as a sequel to the first Martian sets.

=== Space Police III (2009–2010) ===
Space Police III continued the Lego trend of humans versus aliens started in the former Mars Mission theme. This is the first time the Space Police have been pitted against monstrous-looking aliens instead of human-looking villains, like Blacktron or Spyrius. It is also the first Space Police theme to include enemy ships instead of just prisoners, and it is the first Space Police theme in 16 years. A gang, including Kranxx, Snake, the Skull Twins, Slizer, and Squidman, are the main troublemakers for Space Police III with independent, Frenzy keeping them busy as well. However, another antagonist of the series named Rench bears the old Blacktron Future Generation logo on his uniform (which is an updated original Blacktron uniform). Hinting that he may have a connection with the old Blacktron faction, as well as hinting that the Space Police are in the same continuity as their older versions.

=== Alien Conquest (2011) ===
Alien Conquest was released on 17 May 2011, and is the first sub-theme to feature aliens on Earth; specifically, a new wave of aliens begins attacking Earth. Multiple cities around the globe report massive abductions and UFOs in the night sky. The UFOs are finally identified as aliens in saucer-shaped spacecraft who are abducting humans and draining them of their brainpower for fuel in their spaceships, which resemble the classic UFO line of space. Panic breaks out worldwide, and the Alien Defense Unit takes up the cause. Using their ubiquitous blue vehicles, they fight back against the aliens, stopping abductions in their tracks...

=== Galaxy Squad (2013) ===
2013's space-specific theme Galaxy Squad features a team of intergalactic heroes and robot sidekicks trying to defeat an alien race of space bugs—humanoids with insect features—intent on "cocooning" the galaxy with special two-piece cocoons that can each enclose a standard minifigure. The heroes' vehicles feature a notable "split function" ability, which allows them to split into two different vehicles. In the storyline, Galaxy Squad was a direct continuation of Lego Monster Fighters and was directly succeeded by Lego Ultra Agents. In Monster Fighters, the team activated a beam that attracted a swarm of bugs, leading to the events of Galaxy Squad, where, after the big battle, Solomon Blaze returned to Earth, thus creating the events of Ultra Agents.

== Other space-related Lego sets ==
=== Classic Space references in other sets ===
Lego Ideas released a non-licensed set based on the Classic Space line in 2014, the 21109 Exo Suit, which includes two minifigures in green suits printed with the Classic Space logo.

One of the main characters in The Lego Movie and its sequel, The Lego Movie 2, Benny (voiced by Charlie Day), is a blue Classic Space minifigure with notable signs of wear and tear, including a broken chinstrap on his helmet. A set released for the film, 70816 "Benny's Spaceship, Spaceship, SPACESHIP!", featured a spaceship highly reminiscent of Classic Space spaceships, with a predominantly blue and grey color scheme. For the sequel, The Lego Movie 2: The Second Part, a set called "Benny's Space Squad" was released, featuring Benny, along with three astronauts: Kenny, Jenny, and Lenny, which were colored yellow, white, and pink respectively. Another set released for the film, "Emmet and Benny's Build and Fix Workshop", contained a spaceship that imitated the appearance of Classic Space sets. In October 2020, an orange version of the Classic Space astronaut was released with the book Lego Minifigure: A Visual History.

Lego released an updated version of the Galaxy Explorer for their 90th-anniversary celebrations in 2022. Like the original, it included four astronaut minifigures, a robot, and a pull-out rover from the back, but excluded the baseplate and satellite tower. Lego also released digital instructions for two alternate builds based on 924 "Space Cruiser" and 918 "Space Transport".

There have been occasional references to Blacktron and other Space sub-themes in newer sets and minifigures as well.

=== Related sets and themes ===
- Lego produced two sub-themes with space-related content for its Town line with Launch Command in 1995, and Space Port in 1999.
- Since 1999, Lego has produced sets based on the Star Wars franchise. Nearly 700 sets have been produced, six video games and numerous other licensed merchandise.
- 2003's Discovery theme produced six sets related to past and present NASA efforts at the time, including the Apollo Program, the Space Shuttle, the International Space Station, and the Mars Exploration Rover mission.
- In 2008, two fan-designed space sets were released through the Lego Factory theme, Star Justice and Space Skulls were fan-designed sets; they were special edition sets available only through Lego.
- In 2010, Lego released a set under its Toy Story theme called Buzz's Star Command Spaceship. Three more sets were released in 2022 for the spin-off film Lightyear, which is based on the Buzz Lightyear toy's background from that universe.
- Lego produced space themes for its Lego City line involving a realistic, Earth-based approach to space exploration: one in 2011, 2015, a Mars centric theme in 2019, and one in 2022 featuring both Mars and the Moon, These sub-themes are not considered to be official Lego Space themes.
- Since 2012, Lego has produced sets from both the Marvel and DC comic book universes, both of which feature many elements derived from space.
- In 2012, Lego released a set under its Ideas theme based on the spacecraft Hayabusa created by the Japanese Aerospace Exploration Agency (JAXA).
- In 2014, Lego Ideas released a set based on NASA's Curiosity rover.
- In 2015, Lego Ideas released a set based on the BBC science fiction TV series Doctor Who, along with two expansion packs for the toys-to-life video game Lego Dimensions.
- In 2017, Lego Creator released two space-related sets, 31062 Robot Explorer and 31066 Space Shuttle Explorer. Lego Ideas also released a set based on the Saturn V rocket used during the Apollo 11 mission. One called "Women of NASA" that containing four minifigures based on female NASA scientists Sally Ride, Margaret Hamilton, Mae Jemison, and Nancy Grace Roman, with Katherine Johnson missing from the original submission due to licensing issues.
- In 2018, a set from the film The Lego Batman Movie called the "Bat-Space Shuttle" was released.
- In 2019, Lego Creator Expert released a set based on the Apollo 11 Lunar Lander to commemorate the 50th anniversary of the first Moon landing in 1969. and a model of the Space Shuttle Discovery was released in early 2021, based on the STS-31 mission which deployed the Hubble Space Telescope.

=== 2024 relaunch ===
In December 2023 sets with the Space logo and branding as subthemes of Lego City, Lego Friends, Lego Dreamzzz, Lego Technic, Lego Classic, Lego Duplo, and Lego Creator have been leaked with a release of 2024.

== See also ==
- Lego Mars Mission
- Lego Brawls
