= Lego Mindstorms EV3 =

Programmable robotics kit

- Type: Lego set
- Inception: September 2013
- Manufacturer: The Lego Group
- Available: No
- Last production year: 2020

LEGO Mindstorms EV3 (stylized: LEGO MINDSTORMS EV3) is the third generation of LEGO's Mindstorms robotics kit line. It is the successor to the second generation LEGO Mindstorms NXT kit. The "EV" designation refers to the "evolution" of the Mindstorms product line. "3" refers to the fact that it is the third generation of computer modules - first was the RCX and the second is the NXT. It was officially announced on January 4, 2013, at the CES Las Vegas and was released in stores on September 1, 2013. Especially for the LEGOWORLD show in Copenhagen (DK) and Utrecht (NL) for the new release a limited giveaway set was created ‘EV3MEG mini’ (10k units). The education edition was released on August 1, 2013. There are many competitions using this set, including the FIRST LEGO League Challenge and the World Robot Olympiad, sponsored by LEGO.

After an announcement in October 2022, The Lego Group officially discontinued Lego Mindstorms at the end of 2022.

== Overview ==
The biggest change from the LEGO Mindstorms NXT and NXT 2.0 to the EV3 is the technological advances in the programmable brick. The main processor of the NXT was an ARM7 microcontroller, whereas the EV3 has a more powerful ARM9 CPU running Linux. A USB connector and Micro SD slot (up to 32 GB) are new to the EV3. It comes with the plans to build 5 different robots: EV3RSTORM, GRIPP3R, R3PTAR, SPIK3R, and TRACK3R. LEGO has also released instructions online to build 12 additional projects: ROBODOZ3R, BANNER PRINT3R, EV3MEG, BOBB3E, MR-B3AM, RAC3 TRUCK, KRAZ3, EV3D4, EL3CTRIC GUITAR, DINOR3X, WACK3M, and EV3GAME. It uses a program called LEGO Mindstorms EV3 Home Edition, which is developed by LabVIEW, to write code using blocks instead of lines. However it can also be programmed on the actual robot and saved. MicroPython support was added on 18 May 2020.

The EV3 Home (31313) set consists of: 1 EV3 programmable brick, 2 Large Motors, 1 Medium Motor, 1 Touch Sensor, 1 Color Sensor, 1 Infrared Sensor, 1 Remote Control, cables, USB cable, and 585 TECHNIC elements.

The Education EV3 Core Set (45544) set consists of: 1 EV3 programmable brick, 2 Large Motors, 1 Medium Motor, 2 Touch Sensors, 1 Color Sensor, 1 Gyroscope Sensor, 1 Ultrasonic Sensor, cables, USB cable, 1 Rechargeable battery and 547 TECHNIC elements.

An expansion set for the Educational Core Set, which can be bought separately, contains 853 LEGO elements. However, the expansion set and the educational set combined do not contain enough components necessary to build most robots of the retail set. This contrasts with NXT; the educational set combined with the resource set could build any of the retail designs. The EV3 educational set was released a month earlier than the retail set, on August 1, 2013. Robots that can be built with the core education set are the EV3 educator robot, the GyroBoy, the Color Sorter, the Puppy and the Robot Arm H25. Robots that can be built with the expansion set are the Tank Bot, the Znap, the Stair Climber, the Elephant and a remote control. Another robot that can be built with a pair of core sets and an expansion set is the Spinner Factory. NXT's Hitechnic sensors Blocks can be used with EV3 & NXT.

NXT's sensors can be used with the EV3. It can boot an alternative operating system from a microSD card, which makes it possible to run a modded firmware, ev3dev, a Debian Linux-based operating system.

Comparison
	Inventor/Spike Prime	EV3	NXT	RCX
Release Date	October 2020/August 2019	September 2013	July 2006	1998
Display	5x5 LED matrix white display	178×128 pixel Monochrome LCD	100×64 pixel Monochrome LCD	segmented Monochrome LCD
Main Processor	STM32F413 (ARM Cortex M4F) @100 MHz	TI Sitara AM1808 (ARM926EJ-S core) @300 MHz	Atmel AT91SAM7S256 (ARM7TDMI core) @48 MHz	Hitachi H8/300 @16 MHz
Main Memory	320 kB RAM; 1 MB Flash; 32 MB Flash (secondary chip)	64 MB RAM; 16 MB Flash microSDHC Slot	64 KB RAM; 256 KB Flash	32 KB RAM; 16 KB ROM
USB Host Port	Yes	Yes	No	No
WiFi	No	Optional dongle via USB port	No	No
Bluetooth	Yes	Yes	Yes	No
Connects to Apple devices	Yes	Yes	No	No

== Compatibility ==
All NXT sensors, motors, and building elements work with EV3 and are recognized as NXT sensors/motors when plugged in. EV3 sensors do not work with the NXT, but EV3 motors do. The NXT brick can be programmed with the EV3 software, but lacks some software features. EV3 software can be used to program the NXT, but some extra programming-blocks must be downloaded, such as the Ultrasonic sensor (which is included in the standard NXT kit, but not the standard EV3 kit). The EV3 brick cannot be programmed with the standard NXT software, but some third-party software supports both systems. Scratch also included an extension that allows users to program the EV3.

== Notable robots made with the EV3 platform ==
- The Braigo is a robotic Braille printer designed by Shubham Banerjee, a 12-year-old boy from Santa Clara, California in the Silicon Valley region. It is a modified version of the BANNER PRINT3R project, designed by Ralph Hempel. Its low cost (US$354) is an advantage over typical Braille printers (which can cost upwards of $2000).
- The CubeStormer III is a Rubik's Cube solving robot, the former Guinness World Records record holder for the fastest Rubik's Cube solving robot - 3.256 seconds. The previous record of 5.27 seconds was held by the CubeStormer II, which was built with previous generation NXT parts. The CubeStormer III broke the record on March 15, 2014.
- The MindCuber is similar to the CubeStormer III, as its main purpose is to solve the Rubik's Cube as well. There are multiple variants of the machine, such as the MindCuber-RI (made with the MINDSTORMS Robot Inventor kit), the PrimeCuber (made with the MINDSTORMS Spike Prime kit), and the MindCuber education kit variant (made with the education core set of the MINDSTORMS EV3).

== Enhancements ==
On the EV3 AM1808 platform, it is possible with a small hack to double the encoder's resolution. By enabling edge triggered interrupts on the encoder B line (called direction line by LEGO), it is possible to have 720 increments per turn instead of 360. This enhancement allows for smoother rotation at low speed and better position control. This hack was not possible on the NXT due to a hardware limitation. The modified firmware implementing this modification is called EV3.14.

== See also ==
- ROBOTC
- Dexter Industries - Sensors for the EV3
- LeJOS - Firmware and Java API replacement for EV3 programming.
- C-STEM Studio
