= HTL1 Lastenstrasse =

HTL 1 Lastenstrasse
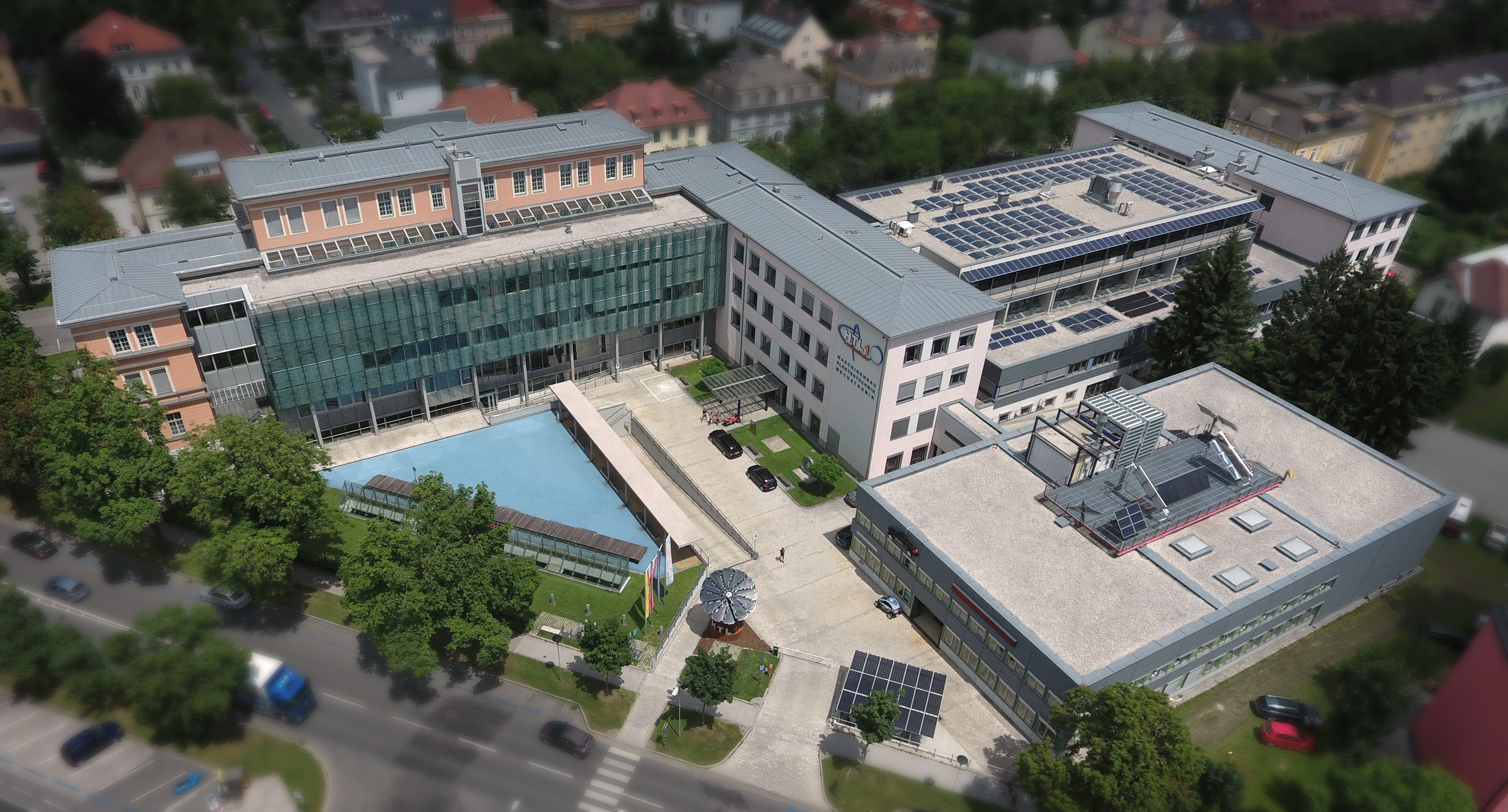

Location
- Lastenstrasse 1, 9020 Klagenfurt; Carinthia; Austria; 46.6200°N 14.3163°E

Information
- Type: Technical secondary school
- Motto: Committed to performance, obliged to humanity.
- Established: 1861; 165 years ago
- Principal: Mag. Dr. Michael Archer
- Teaching staff: approx. 120
- Website: htl1-klagenfurt.at/index.php/en

HTL 1 Lastenstrasse is a technical secondary school located in Carinthia, Austria. Established in 1861, the school focuses on mechanical engineering, electrical engineering and mechatronics. The school additionally emphasises environmental technology including e-mobility and green energy. HTL 1 Lastenstrasse consists of 34 workshops and laboratories, including its own forge and foundry. In 2019, HTL 1 Lastenstrasse commenced a partnership with the HTBLA Pitzelstätten that offered to students an "agricultural engineering and environmental technology" emphasis.

== Departments ==
After finishing eight or nine years of school, students can pursue further education at the HTL 1 Lastenstrasse. They can attend the day school, which is divided into a four-year technical college and a five-year program that provides an intensified, practically oriented, technical education. Renewable and green energy are two main aspects integrated in all departments. While the technical college ends with a certificate, students of the higher department additionally write a diploma thesis and complete their secondary education with a school-leaving examination.

=== Department of Mechanical Engineering ===
The mechanical engineering education at the HTL 1 Lastenstrasse subsumes three main areas:

- General mechanical engineering: power engineering, environmental technology, extraction technology, and automatisation and manufacturing technology
- Automotive engineering: functioning of engines, state-of-the-art propulsion technology
- Construction management: design and production of various components of engines and vehicles

=== Department of Mechatronics ===
The education at the Department of Mechatronics is divided into three main areas Automation – Robotics, Green Innovation - MINT and Automation – Industry 4.0. In the 2018/19 school year the HTL 1 Lastenstrasse implemented an additional school-specific focus called bionics. This area of interest is actually a combination of two terms and represents the blending of the words biology and technology; it basically means to use our knowledge of nature and learn how to use its potential for further purposes.

Education at this department subsumes an interdisciplinary knowledge of mechanics, electronics, and information technology, representing a consequential foundation for modern manufacturing systems. In case of information technology, students are prepared for the requirements of the physical, as well as virtual, world of work and become familiar with Industry 4.0.

=== Department of Electrical Engineering ===
The department focuses on e-mobility, e-storage, and e-industry. Occupational areas for graduates are, for instance, those in connection with electrical installation technology, automatisation, and propulsion technology, as well as professions within the area of e-mobility, connected storage systems, and alarm and security technology. Moreover, in addition to the apprenticeship diploma as an electrical engineer, graduates are permitted to start their own business and lead a company.

=== Agricultural Engineering and Environmental Technology ===
With the aim to stay up-to-date and meet the latest standards of the industry, the HTL 1 Lastenstrasse and the HTBLA Pitzelstätten have decided to cooperate and to offer an additional specification called "agricultural engineering and environmental technology". This new educational emphasis focuses on knowledge about agriculture and also teaches pupils with technical know-how knowledge. Further areas of interest such as agromechatronics, renewable energy as well as digital farming are taught as key factors of modern agriculture.

== Evening School and Technical College ==
The HTL 1 Lastenstrasse also offers an evening school for mechanical engineering that is particularly suitable for people in employment or those that require a more flexible timetable. This way, they can acquire a high school diploma while also benefiting from an evening class module system. Depending on previous work experience the duration of study is between 6 and 10 terms.

Additionally, the HTL 1 Lastenstrasse offers a technical college for mechatronics with the main emphasis lying on automatisation and robotics. Students of the technical college can graduate after 4 years and are required to do an internship in a company within the last year of training.

== Historical background ==
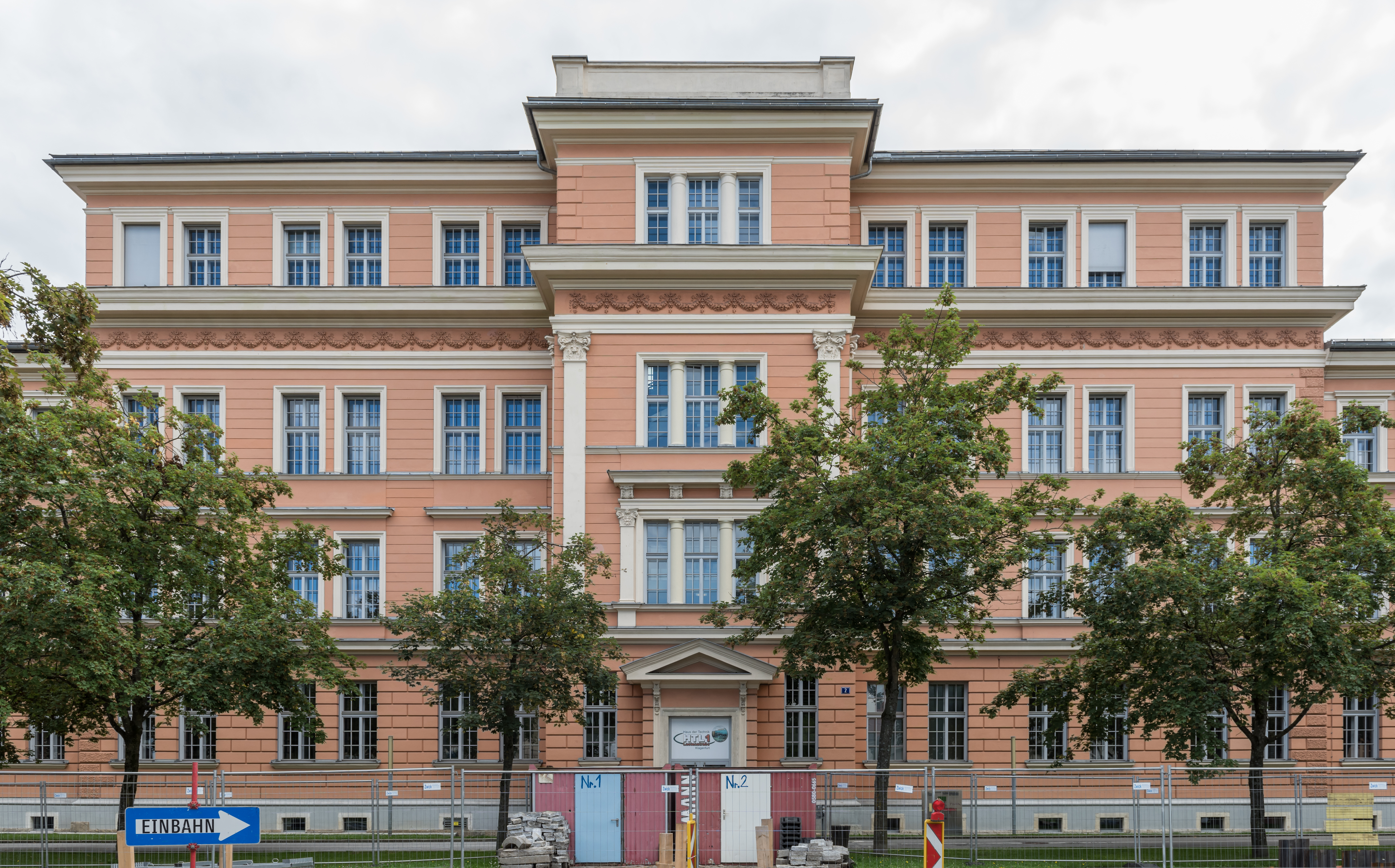
Entrance at Jessernigstrasse

The HTL 1 Lastenstrasse has a long history. Not only was the school building gradually extended, but major historical events including WWI and WWII immensely influenced this educational institution and its everyday school life.

Initiated by several companies and enterprises located in Carinthia, an institute concerned with the education of specifically qualified employees for industrial purposes was eventually founded. On December 11, 1849, a technical preparatory school was set up. As time passed, the school site was repeatedly changed to cope with the increasing number of pupils and eventually moved into a building in the Jessernigstraße, where it is still situated.

During both World Wars, everyday school life was affected making it impossible to conduct regular school lessons. During WWII, the HTL 1 Lastenstrasse was also not spared from bombing. As a matter of fact, the entire workshop wing was destroyed. Thus, in the post-war era, a number of changes took place including reconstruction of the school.

Furthermore, the technical secondary education was reformed on a larger scale, including a reduction of lessons per week, a regulation of the school system, and an expansion of the school building due to the growing number of students. At the same time, the school's cooperative work with the industry intensified and eventually resulted in the HTL 1 Lastenstrasse receiving the label of a Höhere technische Bundes- Lehr- und Versuchsanstalt (“Austrian Federal Polytechnic and Research Institute”).

Moreover, the educational opportunities for young people steadily increased and were even extended by an additional department (the Department of Mechatronics), another workshop area, and new subjects such as measurement and control technology as well as energy and environmental technology.

== School development ==
=== Female pupils ===
Throughout the last couple of years, the number of female students at the HTL 1 Lastenstrasse has continuously risen. In order to support them, the school conducts several projects particularly designed for girls including, for instance, meetings that aim to connect female students and separate physical education for girls only. Further initiatives to interest and support girls in the technological world of work are, for example, girls teams, a girls brunch, and meetings for networking among female pupils.

=== Sustainability ===
For the future, the HTL wants to promote the idea of sustainability and, therefore, aims to focus more and more on environmental technology. E-mobility is one of the main emphasises of the HTL 1 Lastenstrasse; hence, pupils are particularly trained in terms of vehicle charging processes and energy storage. For this purpose, the school possesses laboratories, and workshops, and its own vehicle fleet consisting of e-bikes and e-scooters.

Moreover, the HTL 1 Lastenstrasse has devoted itself to an ecologically, socially, and economically sustainable school culture. Principles such as an environmental consciousness, health awareness, and a global sense of responsibility are supposed to be dealt with in all subjects. Consequently, the declared objectives of the HTL are to promote pupils’ general awareness for sustainable ways of living, an education for sustainability, and an ecologically sustainable school culture.

In order to reach these goals, the HTL 1 Lastenstrasse, among other things, has installed several photovoltaic plants on the roof of the school building. Since 2017 the school has a new photovoltaic system with an efficiency of 60 kilowatt-hours on the roof of the building. This photovoltaic plant not only provides the school with additional electricity and is, of course, part of the syllabus, but also serves to shape pupils’ opinions of green energy.

== Headmasters ==
The following list was taken from the school's Festschrift of 2011:

- 1861–1869: Josef Winter
- 1869–1870: Friederich Dietlen
- 1870–1893: Gustav Barth
- 1893–1893: Leopold Böckl
- 1898–1919: Schatzl v. Mühlfort
- 1919–1919: Fanz Jung
- 1919–1934: Meyer Oswald
- 1934–1938: Treven Karl
- 1938–1945: Otto Götz
- 1945–1946: Klaus Rubner
- 1946–1968: Karl Fornara
- 1968–1969: Reinhold Heider
- 1969–1988: Robert Essmann
- 1988–2006: Heinrich Klepp
- 2006–2016: Franz Korper
- since 2016: Michael Archer
