= The All-Earth Ecobot Challenge =

The All-Earth Ecobot Challenge (or Ecobots) is a competition that occurs yearly for students throughout Texas in grades 5–8 that started in 2009 (17 years ago). It encourages students to be creative, learn more about robots, learn about the Natural environment and how to help protect it, and prepares them for future jobs. The Ecobot Challenge uses various Lego pieces, Lego NXT sets, and PowerPoint.

== Preparation ==
Usually, a teacher from each school helps coaches teams that come before and/or after school to prepare by programming their NXT and sometimes creating their Marketing Presentation(which could also be done at home, but not the NXT programming) in that teacher's classroom. Usually, the team starts to program and make their presentation in early March of earlier.

== Competition ==
The competition held yearly consists of two sections: the Robotics section and the Marketing section. They are two separate parts to the competition. The competition is usually held around mid-April. The robot in the competition is only allowed to be touched in "Home". Home is where the robot starts and ends when completing challenges.

=== Robotics ===
This section requires students to program a Lego NXT to complete various tasks that change each year. The more tasks students complete, the more points they get (for a maximum of 300 points). To complete the various tasks, students build Lego attachments usually attached to the motors included in the Lego NXT kit.

=== Marketing ===
This section requires students to think of and to make a PowerPoint presentation about an imaginary robot that will help the Earth environmentally. They present their presentation to judges who score them.

=== Sponsors ===
The Lego NXT sets and the competition is costly. Ecobots rely on sponsors to fund the competition. For a list of sponsors, go to their sponsor list page.

To learn more go to the Ecobots home page.
