= Physical Etoys =

Physical Etoys is a free open-source extension of Etoys developed by Gonzalo Zabala, Ricardo Moran, Sebastián Blanco and Matías Teragni at the Universidad Abierta Interamericana. Etoys is an object-oriented and prototype-based visual programming language created by Alan Kay for the use in education. Physical Etoys contains the majority of Etoys characteristics. Its philosophy is "help kids model and program the real world in order to learn more about it". Physical Etoys lets different electronic devices such as Lego NXT, Arduino boards, Sphero, Kinect, Wiimote joystick, among others, be easily programmed and interact between themselves due to its block scripting system.
In 2010, Physical Etoys won the first innovation technology award given at the ESUG (European Smalltalk User Group) conference.

== Motivation ==
Physical Etoys benefits robotics learning in primary/high school and it is based on the constructionism theory created by Papert.
The reasons why Physical Etoys benefits robot learning are:

Ease of learning: Physical Etoys reduces the complexity of code abstraction letting the kid experiment with virtual objects which are closely related with the real objects and vice versa. Physical Etoys also proposes a gradual programming learning curve: when the kid has the maturity he can automatically put his first step on Smalltalk and go into more complex topics.

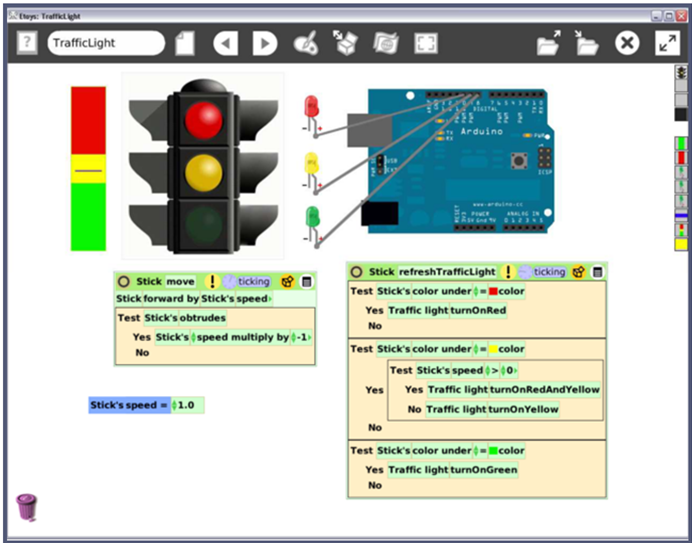
A traffic light implemented in Physical Etoys

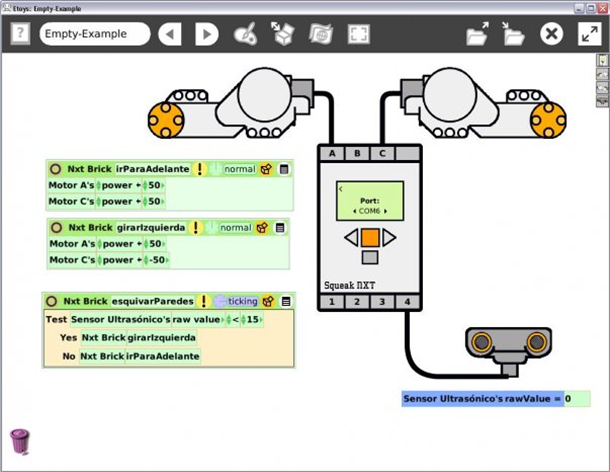
A Lego NXT car which avoids walls implemented in Physical Etoys

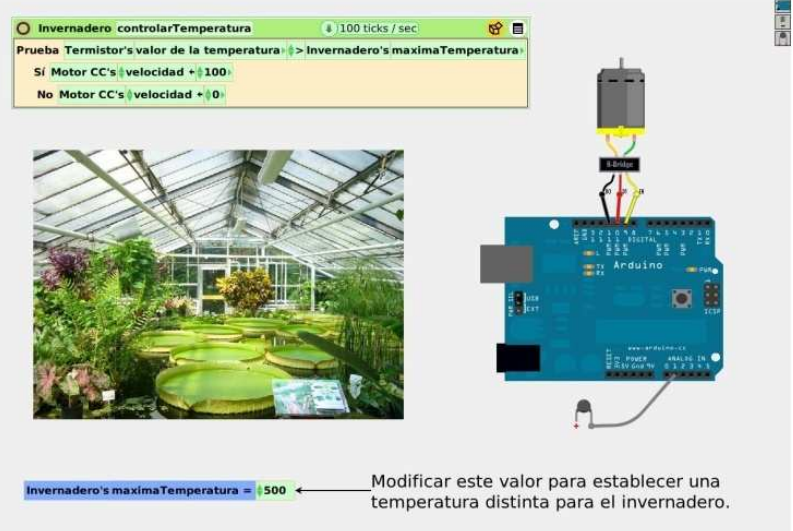
A greenhouse implemented in Physical Etoys

In harmony with the mainstreaming of the technology: Robotics is closely related with different scientific disciplines such as logic, mathematics, physics, artificial intelligence, biology, medicine and nanotechnology. But it is also possible, due to the robotic kits' versatility, to develop devices related with many other disciplines such as music, history, geography, literature among many others. Physical Etoys inherits all the educational potential of Etoys in order to let the child apply computation in his subjects and represent world's phenomena without waiting for a specific technological subject. Moreover, Physical Etoys is divided into a set of independent modules that interact among themselves and each of them represents a specific robotic kit.

Learning with programmable real material: Working with real material help kids train fine motor skills and cognitive abilities related to physical experimentation, trial-and-error, dealing and comprehending the infinite continuous values which the real world presents. Working with real material allows to face different challenges that have to be dealt with teams. The building, programming, order and care of the material and the elaboration of the work document require the coordinated participation of the team members with different but integrated roles as a real work schema.

Accessibility: Physical Etoys is an open source and free software that can be used with the OLPC machines. It was adopted by the Argentinian government in the "Conectar igualdad" and "Plan Sarmiento" programs. Actually, Physical Etoys is beginning to gain popularity in France, USA and Spain. The software supports the following languages: English, Spanish, and Portuguese.
