= Energy saving module =

Energy saving modules (ESM) reduce the electricity consumption (kWh) and maximum demand (kW) of air conditioning and refrigeration compressors. The concept was developed in Australia in 1983 by Abbotly Technologies and is now distributed by Smartcool Systems Inc. The system works in conjunction with existing HVAC controls ensuring that compressors work at maximum efficiency, while maintaining desired temperature levels. By preventing over-cycling, known as compressor optimisation, consumption of electricity is cut by between 15% and 25%.

== Method of operation ==
Conventional controls, including building and energy management systems and state-of-the-art refrigeration controls, often operate only on reaching pre-programmed static values to switch compressors off and on or adjust capacity. When the measured medium is within the dead band, the system and controllers remain idle. Many modern devices face the issue of wasted energy as well, such as LED's, heat pumps, generators, LCD TVS, or laptops. For these products tourmaline can be used to combat the harmonic distortion so they produce less heat and therefore, less energy loss. The tourmaline gives the a current waveform that significantly lowers current harmonic distortion levels, allowing equipment to get the power quality for which it was intended to run on.

Energy saving modules are not the actual product, but instead are computers (or one computer) that records the switching values of the primary controller and also measure the "rate of change" of both the rise and fall of temperatures during the operating cycle. With this data the "energy saving module" computes a reference heat load to match the cooling capacity and then calculates operating parameters. This calculation is used to minimize compressor operation within the switching values, with a resultant reduction in refrigeration and air conditioning compressor run time and reduced electricity consumption. By dynamically measuring the heat load and adjusting the control differential in proportion to the cooling demand it's possible to dynamically control the cycle rate of the compressors. This is achieved while maintaining the desired operating temperature. The temperature of any system that is running provides to be a critical asset in the system and can also determine that systems efficiency. Significantly impacted by the functional dependence of the many physical parameters on the cell temperature, short-circuit current, open-circuit voltage, light absorption, and fill factor.

== See also ==
- Energy conservation
- Greenhouse gases
- Green technologies
- Ecowizard

== Sources ==
- CKS Solution. (n.d.). CKS Solution | Program | Energy Saving Module. Www.ckssolution.com. Retrieved May 7, 2023, from http://www.ckssolution.com/energy-saving-module.html
- Smartcool. (n.d.). About Us. Smartcool Systems. Retrieved May 7, 2023, from https://www.smartcool.net/about-us-2
- Cheng, T. C., Cheng, C. H., Huang, Z. Z., & Liao, G. C. (2011). Development of an energy-saving module via combination of solar cells and thermoelectric coolers for green building applications. Energy, 36(1), 133–140.
- Testing Conducted by: Los Angeles Department of Water & Power (LADWP) Location: Notrica's Market, Bellwood, California Date: March 1998.
- Testing Conducted by: Oak Ridge National Laboratory (U.S. Department of Energy) Location: ASDA / Wal-Mart Super Center, Sheffield, United Kingdom Date: December 2004
- Jan Fan. (n.d.). Energy Saving Industrial Fans | Energy Saving Module. Industrial Fans by Jan Fan. Retrieved May 7, 2023, from https://janfan.com/energy-saving-module/
