= Enchanting (programming language) =

Enchanting is a free and open-source cross-platform educational programming language designed to program Lego Mindstorms NXT robots. It is developed mainly by Southern Alberta Robotics Enthusiasts group in the province of Alberta, Canada, and runs on macOS, Windows, and experimentally on Linux devices. Since 2013, Enchanting version 0.2 has been available.

== Technology ==
Its predecessor, the 1998 Robotics Invention System was developed by Scratch developer team led by Mitch Resnick at MIT Media Lab. Based on BYOB, since renamed Snap!, which is developed by the University of California, Berkeley, the current version of Enchanting runs on Windows XP, Windows Vista, Windows 7 and Windows 8 (but not Windows 8 RT); on macOS it runs on version 10.4 and newer; and on Linux it runs on Ubuntu version 10.10.

== Educational resources, use and events ==
It has been used in secondary-to-tertiary computer science program at Monash University in Australia, where an interactive PDF book for use on computer or iPad, titled Robotics with Enchanting and LEGO NXT is available for free download. Most recent SABRE Games, organized in 2013 by Southern Alberta Robotics Enthusiasts group, consisted of three disciplines: Tug Of War, where two robots are tied together with a string and each tries to pull its opponent over the center line; Sumo, where two robots are placed in a sumo ring and each tries to find and push its opponent out without going out of the ring itself; and Parade, where robots follow a line trying not to crash into the robot in front.

== See also ==
- List of robotics software
