= Environmental technology =

Technical and technological processes for protection of the environment

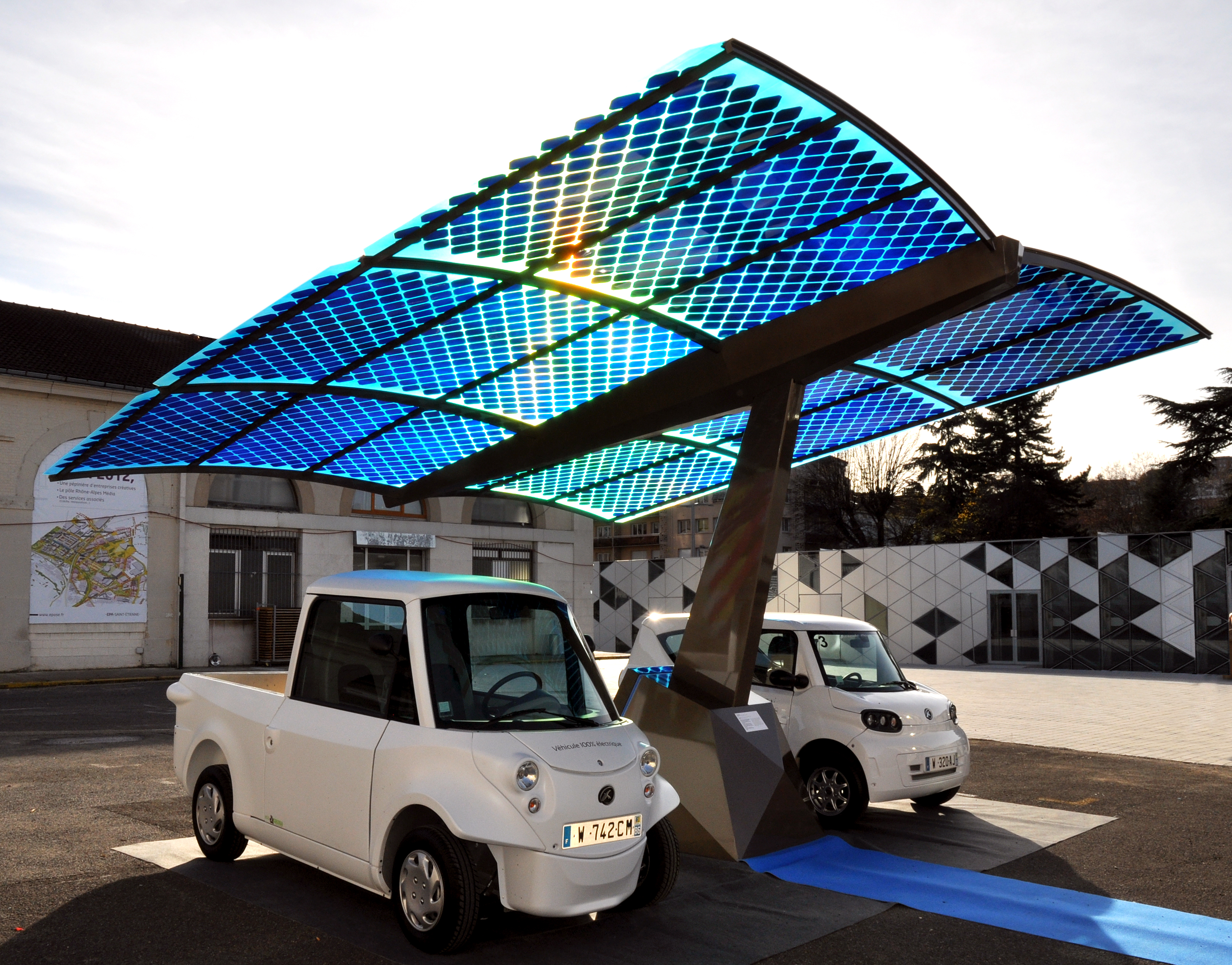
Sustainable urban design and innovation: Photovoltaic ombrière SUDI is an autonomous and mobile station that replenishes energy for electric vehicles using solar energy.

Environmental technology (or envirotech) is the application of one or more of environmental science, green chemistry, environmental monitoring and electronic devices to monitor, model and conserve the natural environment and resources, and to curb the negative impacts of human involvement.

The term is sometimes also used to describe sustainable energy generation technologies such as photovoltaics, wind turbines, etc.

== Purification and waste management ==
=== Water purification ===
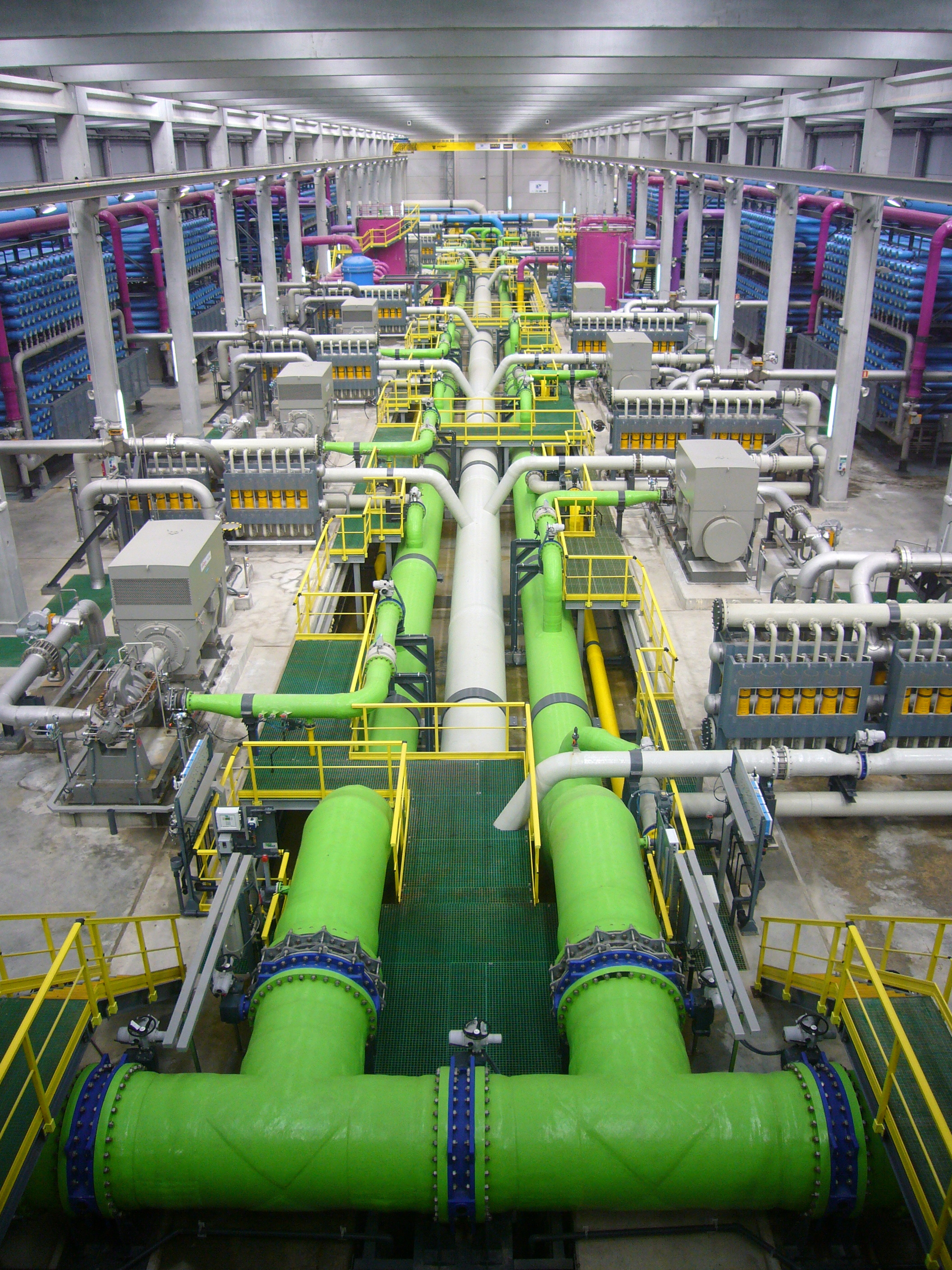
A view across a reverse osmosis desalination plant in Spain

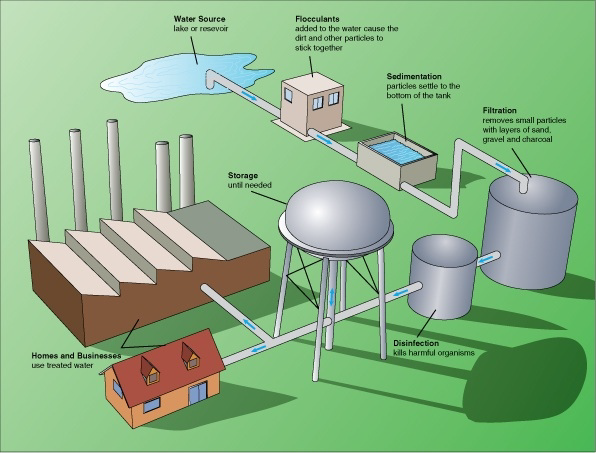
Typical drinking water treatment processes.

Water purification is the process of removing undesirable chemicals, biological contaminants, suspended solids, and gases from water. The goal is to produce water that is fit for specific purposes. Most water is purified and disinfected for human consumption (drinking water), but water purification may also be carried out for a variety of other purposes, including medical, pharmacological, chemical, and industrial applications. The history of water purification includes a wide variety of methods. The methods used include physical processes such as filtration, sedimentation, and distillation; biological processes such as slow sand filters or biologically active carbon; chemical processes such as flocculation and chlorination; and the use of electromagnetic radiation such as ultraviolet light.

Water purification can reduce the concentration of particulate matter including suspended particles, parasites, bacteria, algae, viruses, and fungi as well as reduce the concentration of a range of dissolved and particulate matter.

The standards for drinking water quality are typically set by governments or by international standards. These standards usually include minimum and maximum concentrations of contaminants, depending on the intended use of the water.

A visual inspection cannot determine if water is of appropriate quality. Simple procedures such as boiling or the use of a household point of use water filter (typically with activated carbon) are not sufficient for treating all possible contaminants that may be present in water from an unknown source. Even natural spring water—considered safe for all practical purposes in the 19th century—must now be tested before determining what kind of treatment, if any, is needed. Chemical and microbiological analysis, while expensive, are the only way to obtain the information necessary for deciding on the appropriate method of purification.

=== Air purification ===
Air purification describes the processes used to remove contaminants and airborne pollutants to reduce the potential adverse effects on humans and the environment. The process of air purification may be performed using methods such as mechanical filtration, electrostatic filtration ionization, activated carbon adsorption, photocatalytic oxidation, and ultraviolet light germicidal irradiation.

=== Sewage treatment ===
Sewage treatment is a type of wastewater treatment which aims to remove contaminants from sewage to produce an effluent that is suitable for discharge to the surrounding environment or an intended reuse application, thereby preventing water pollution from raw sewage discharges. Sewage contains wastewater from households and businesses and possibly pre-treated industrial wastewater. There are a large number of sewage treatment processes to choose from. These can range from decentralized systems (including on-site treatment systems) to large centralized systems involving a network of pipes and pump stations (called sewerage) which convey the sewage to a treatment plant. For cities that have a combined sewer, the sewers will also carry urban runoff (stormwater) to the sewage treatment plant. Sewage treatment often involves two main stages, called primary and secondary treatment, while advanced treatment also incorporates a tertiary treatment stage with polishing processes and nutrient removal. Secondary treatment can reduce organic matter (measured as biological oxygen demand) from sewage, using aerobic or anaerobic biological processes. A quaternary treatment step (sometimes referred to as advanced treatment) can also be added for the removal of organic micropollutants, such as pharmaceuticals. This has been implemented in full-scale in Sweden.

A large number of sewage treatment technologies have been developed, mostly using biological treatment processes. Design engineers and decision makers need to take into account technical and economical criteria of each alternative when choosing a suitable technology. Often, the main criteria for selection are desired effluent quality, expected construction and operating costs, availability of land, energy requirements and sustainability aspects. In developing countries and in rural areas with low population densities, sewage is often treated by various on-site sanitation systems and not conveyed in sewers. These systems include septic tanks connected to drain fields, on-site sewage systems (OSS), and vermifilter systems. On the other hand, advanced and relatively expensive sewage treatment plants may include tertiary treatment with disinfection and possibly even a fourth treatment stage to remove micropollutants.

At the global level, an estimated 52% of sewage is treated. However, sewage treatment rates are highly unequal for different countries around the world. For example, while high-income countries treat approximately 74% of their sewage, developing countries treat an average of just 4.2%.

The treatment of sewage is part of the field of sanitation. Sanitation also includes the management of human waste and solid waste as well as stormwater (drainage) management. The term sewage treatment plant is often used interchangeably with the term wastewater treatment plant.

=== Environmental remediation ===
Environmental remediation is the removal of pollutants or contaminants which are harmful to people and the environment. The environment includes groundwater, surface water soil or sediments and is done using various methods including soil excavation, soil stabilization, and groundwater treatment.

Water remediation mainly consists of treating agricultural, human consumption, and industrial water to remove any chemical, biological, or radiological contamination using physical, chemical, electrochemical and biological methods.

Sediment remediation consists of removing contaminated sediments. Is it similar to soil remediation except it is often more sophisticated as it involves additional contaminants.

=== Solid waste management ===
A waste incineration boiler in the Iru Thermal Power Plant (Maardu, Estonia).

Waste-to-energy technologies have shown to be promising in better managing solid waste and being more environmentally conscious. Most waste-to-energy methods fall into the categories of either biochemical or thermochemical processes depending on the composition of the waste. Thermochemical processes, such as gasification, pyrolysis, and incineration, rely on the decomposition of solid waste to produce heat, oil, or gas. Advances in waste-to-energy technologies relying on thermochemical processes have led to more efficient means of generating products and reducing emissions, with incineration facilities turning to emissions control technology to lower air pollution, while gasification and pyrolysis facilities have found ways to produce higher quality oil and biogas. Biochemical methods, including composting, aerobic composting, anaerobic composting, and vermicomposting, degrade organic compounds in solid waste. In aerobic composting, for example, aerobic microbes decompose organic solid waste into primarily carbon dioxide, nitrogen dioxide, and nitrate.

==== AI and ML ====
Artificial intelligence (AI) and machine learning (ML) methods have recently shown to be effective in managing solid waste. For example, AI methods in some municipalities are used to collect, sort through, and classify waste as "glass, plastic, and other biodegradable materials," allowing for more efficient and effective management of solid waste. Hybrid techniques, which are combinations of various individual AI methods, have shown to be more effective than stand-alone methods by addressing their shortcomings. The use of ML in solid waste management can lead to cost savings, particularly for waste management facilities, and more efficient and environmentally friendly waste disposal. A 2021 study developed an image processing method to detect non-biodegradable waste, in the categories of glass, metal, and plastic, from waste bins so that it can be easily separated. A ML model was trained on images of all three categories of non-biodegradable waste, and the validity of the model was tested using a raspberry pi camera. The 2021 study found that the ML model accurately identified metal 75% of the time, plastic 65% of the time, and glass 60% of the time.

==== Drone technology ====
Drone technologies and unmanned aerial vehicles have also been used at solid waste landfills. They have been used to study "spatial and volumetric characteristics of landfills", record emissions of landfill gas, and monitor compliance with landfill regulations. A 2023 study applied drones to identify and classify waste in garbage bins. The drone collected image and video that was then used to inspect every part of the city remotely and better manage solid waste.

Some key challenges and unsolved issues in managing solid waste are the lack of sorting systems that can organize waste and enable appropriate disposal and the lack of "predictive maintenance systems for waste collection vehicles and treatment facilities."

=== E-waste recycling ===
Workers in India manually disassemble electronics to collect and separate metals, hazardous components, and other parts.

Electronic waste, also known as E-waste, is one of the fastest growing types of solid waste with an annual growth rate of 3% to 5%. In traditional e-waste recycling, electronic waste is "disassembled, crushed, and sorted in the factory" to separate the different parts and materials found in the waste. Hazardous components are then "stored and supervised", metals are extracted using advanced techniques, such as pyrometallurgy and hydrometallurgy, and plastics are recycled into new products.

A 2024 study investigated the application of photochemistry and sonochemistry, among other methods, for e-waste recycling. The researchers found that photocatalysis with the use of solar energy was a "green approach" to managing e-waste, however the method led to limited metal collection. Sonochemistry allowed for better metal recovery, and the use of ultrasonication coupled with other processes, such as photochemistry, showed potential in effectively managing e-waste.

==== Bio-metallurgy and supercritical fluid treatment ====
Techniques such as bio-metallurgy and supercritical fluid treatment, particularly using supercritical carbon dioxide as a solvent, have also been used to treat and extract materials from electronic waste. Bio-metallurgy, or bioleaching, involves the use of microorganisms, such as fungi, to recover raw materials from e-waste and is a more environmentally conscious and less costly process than other methods of treating e-waste. The microorganisms generate "organic acids and redox-active compounds" that allow for efficient metal recovery without toxic byproducts. Advancements in biotechnology, such as genetically engineered strains of microorganisms and nanotechnology, have also improved efficiency, quantity of metal recovered, and viability of bio-metallurgy processes. However, the adoption of bio-metallurgy faces issues such as the inherently slow nature of the process and microbial toxicity. Supercritical fluid treatment is a process based on taking advantage of the properties of materials above their critical point, including their critical temperature and critical pressure, to extract metals or other substances from a starting material. Supercritical carbon dioxide is specifically used in green chemistry because it is non-toxic, non-flammable, and not costly to obtain.

==== Biodegradable devices ====
Biodegradable devices, such as mechanical energy harvesters, energy storage, and sensors designed using biodegradable materials, can also help to slow e-waste production. AI can also advance research into biodegradable electronic devices by synthesizing properties of biodegradable materials and how they degrade over time. Some barriers to developing biodegradable devices exist including the lack of understanding of mechanisms for biodegradation and of synthetic biodegradable polymers, the environmental impact of more toxic elements such as molybdenum (Mo) and tungsten (W), and the high cost and short supply of magnesium (Mg), which is a widely used biodegradable material. A 2026 study found that restrictive random-access memory (RRAM) devices were successfully created on "eco-friendly, biodegradable, and flexible substrate," a key advancement in the development of biodegradable devices. The devices are able to retain data well and are operationally stable in addition to being decomposable in water-rich soil, showing the device's ability to reduce long-term environmental impact.

=== Bioremediation ===
Bioremediation is a process that uses microorganisms such as bacteria, fungi, plant enzymes, and yeast to neutralize hazardous containments that can be in the environment. This could help mitigate a variety of environmental hazards, including oil spills, pesticides, heavy metals, and other pollutants. Bioremediation can be conducted either on-site ('in situ') or off-site ('ex situ') which is often necessary if the climate is too cold. Factors influencing the duration of bioremediation would include to the extent of the contamination, environmental conditions, and with timelines that can range from months to years.

=== Examples ===
- Biofiltration
- Bioreactor
- Bioremediation
- Composting toilet
- Desalination
- Thermal depolymerization
- Pyrolysis

== Sustainable energy ==
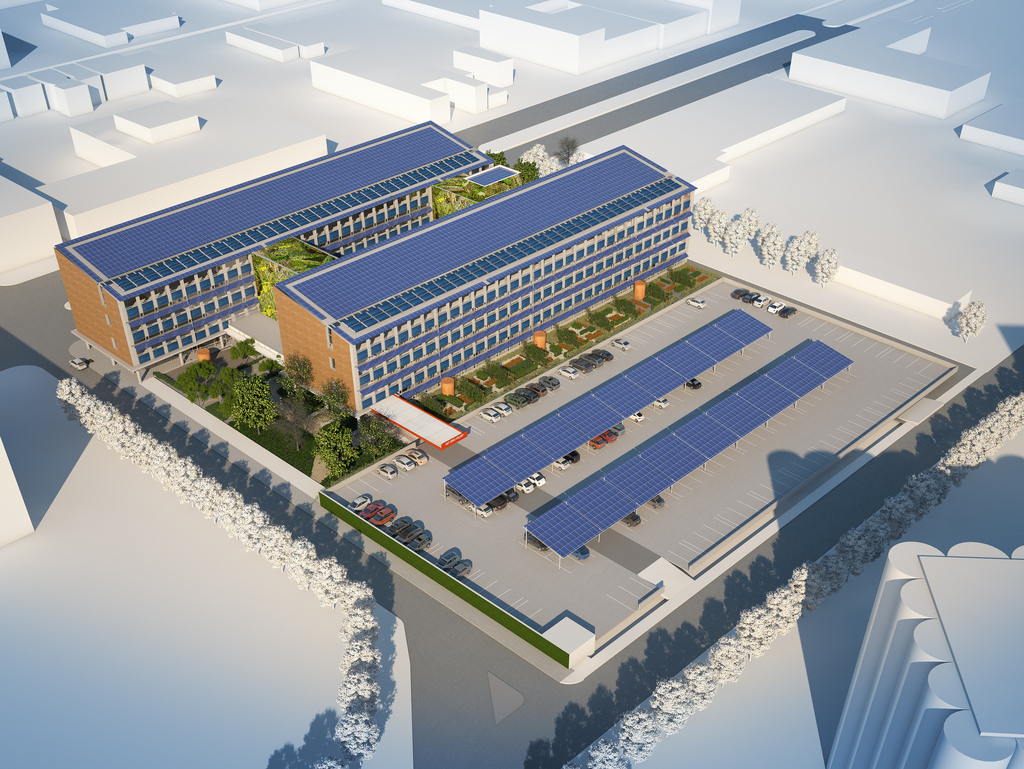
Net Zero Court zero emissions office building prototype in St. Louis, Missouri

Concerns over pollution and greenhouse gases have spurred the search for sustainable alternatives to fossil fuel use. The global reduction of greenhouse gases requires the adoption of energy conservation as well as sustainable generation. That environmental harm reduction involves global changes such as:

- substantially reducing methane emissions from melting perma-frost, animal husbandry, pipeline and wellhead leakage.
- virtually eliminating fossil fuels for vehicles, heat, and electricity.
- carbon dioxide capture and sequestration at point of combustion.
- widespread use of public transport, battery, and fuel cell vehicles
- extensive implementation of wind/solar/water generated electricity
- reducing peak demands with carbon taxes and time of use pricing.

Since fuel used by industry and transportation account for the majority of world demand, by investing in conservation and efficiency (using less fuel), pollution and greenhouse gases from these two sectors can be reduced around the globe. Advanced energy-efficient electric motor (and electric generator) technology that are cost-effective to encourage their application, such as variable speed generators and efficient energy use, can reduce the amount of carbon dioxide (CO_{2}) and sulfur dioxide (SO_{2}) that would otherwise be introduced to the atmosphere, if electricity were generated using fossil fuels. Some scholars have expressed concern that the implementation of new environmental technologies in highly developed national economies may cause economic and social disruption in less-developed economies.

=== Renewable energy ===
Renewable energy is the energy that can be replenished easily. For years we have been using sources such as wood, sun, water, etc. for means for producing energy. Energy that can be produced by natural objects like the sun, wind, etc. is considered to be renewable. Technologies that have been in usage include wind power, hydropower, solar energy, geothermal energy, and biomass/bioenergy. It refers to any form of energy that naturally regenerates over time, and does not run out. This form of energy naturally replenishes and is characterized by a low carbon footprint. Some of the most common types of renewable energy sources include; solar power, wind power, hydroelectric power, and bioenergy which is generated by burning organic matter.

=== Examples ===
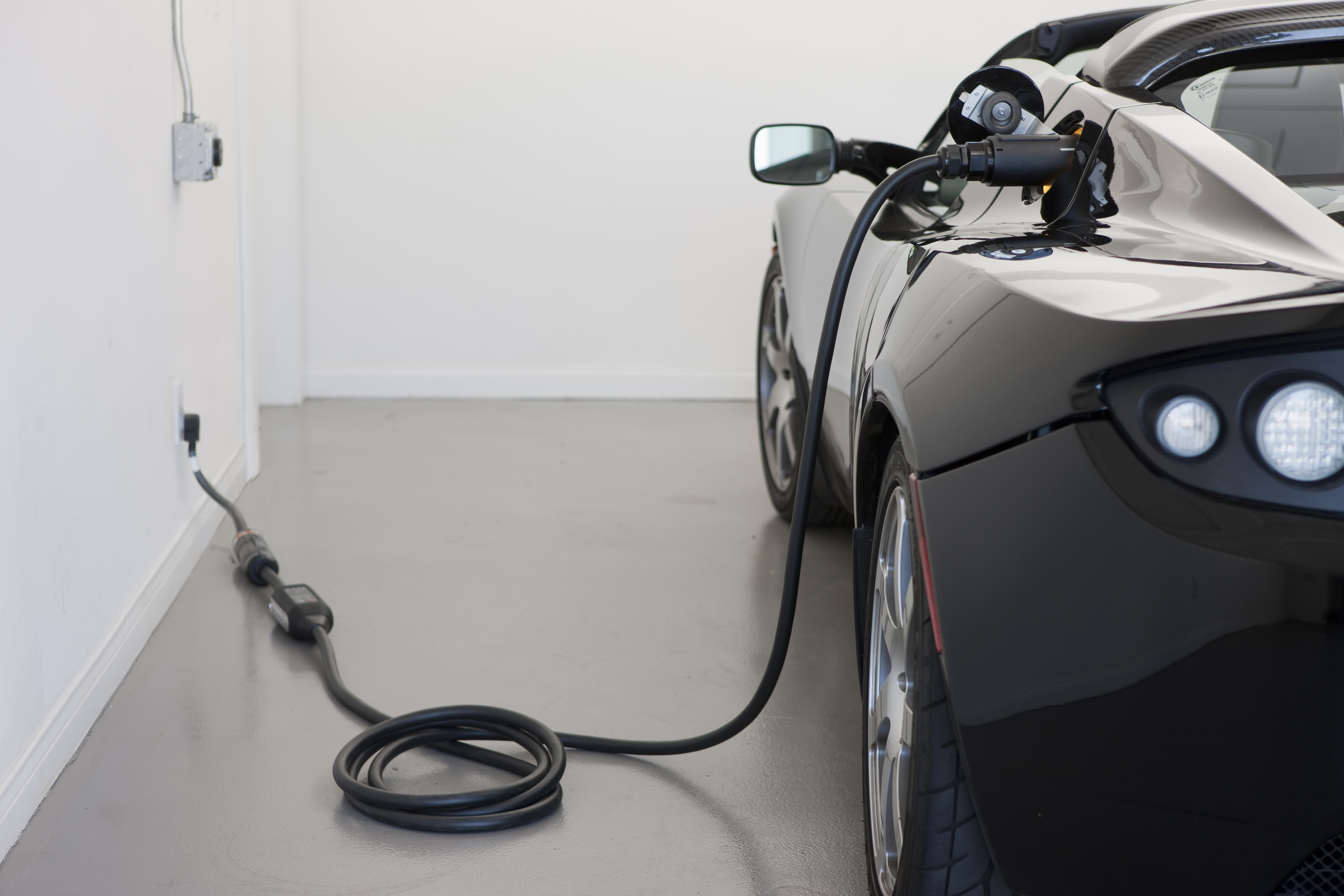
The Tesla Roadster (2008) was the first all-electric sports car for sale and in serial production. It can completely recharge from the electrical grid in 4 to 48 hours depending on the outlet used.

- Energy saving modules
- Heat pump
- Hydrogen fuel cell
- Hydroelectricity
- Ocean thermal energy conversion
- Photovoltaic
- Solar power
- Wave energy
- Wind power
- Wind turbine

==== Renewable Energy Innovations ====
The intersection of technology and sustainability has led to innovative solutions aimed at enhancing the efficiency of renewable energy systems. One such innovation is the integration of wind and solar power to maximize energy production. Companies like Unéole are pioneering technologies that combine solar panels with wind turbines on the same platform, which is particularly advantageous for urban environments with limited space. This hybrid system not only conserves space but also increases the energy yield by leveraging the complementary nature of solar and wind energy availability.

Furthermore, advancements in offshore wind technology have significantly increased the viability and efficiency of wind energy. Modern offshore wind turbines feature improvements in structural design and aerodynamics, which enhance their energy capture and reduce costs. These turbines are now more adaptable to various marine environments, allowing for greater flexibility in location and potentially reducing visual pollution. The floating wind turbines, for example, use tension leg platforms and spar buoys that can be deployed in deeper waters, significantly expanding the potential areas for wind energy generation.

Such innovations not only advance the capabilities of individual renewable technologies but also contribute to a more resilient and sustainable energy grid. By optimizing the integration and efficiency of renewable resources, these technologies play a crucial role in the transition towards a sustainable energy future.

=== Energy conservation ===
Energy conservation is the utilization of devices that require smaller amounts of energy in order to reduce the consumption of electricity. Reducing the use of electricity causes less fossil fuels to be burned to provide that electricity. And it refers to the practice of using less energy through changes in individual behaviors and habits. The main emphasis for energy conservation is the prevention of wasteful use of energy in the environment, to enhance its availability. Some of the main approaches to energy conservation involve refraining from using devices that consume more energy, where possible.

=== eGain forecasting ===
Egain forecasting is a method using forecasting technology to predict the future weather's impact on a building. By adjusting the heat based on the weather forecast, the system eliminates redundant use of heat, thus reducing the energy consumption and the emission of greenhouse gases. It is a technology introduced by the eGain International, a Swedish company that intelligently balances building power consumption. The technology involves forecasting the amount of heating energy required by a building within a specific period, which results in energy efficiency and sustainability. eGain lowers building energy consumption and emissions while determining time for maintenance where inefficiencies are observed.

=== Solar power ===
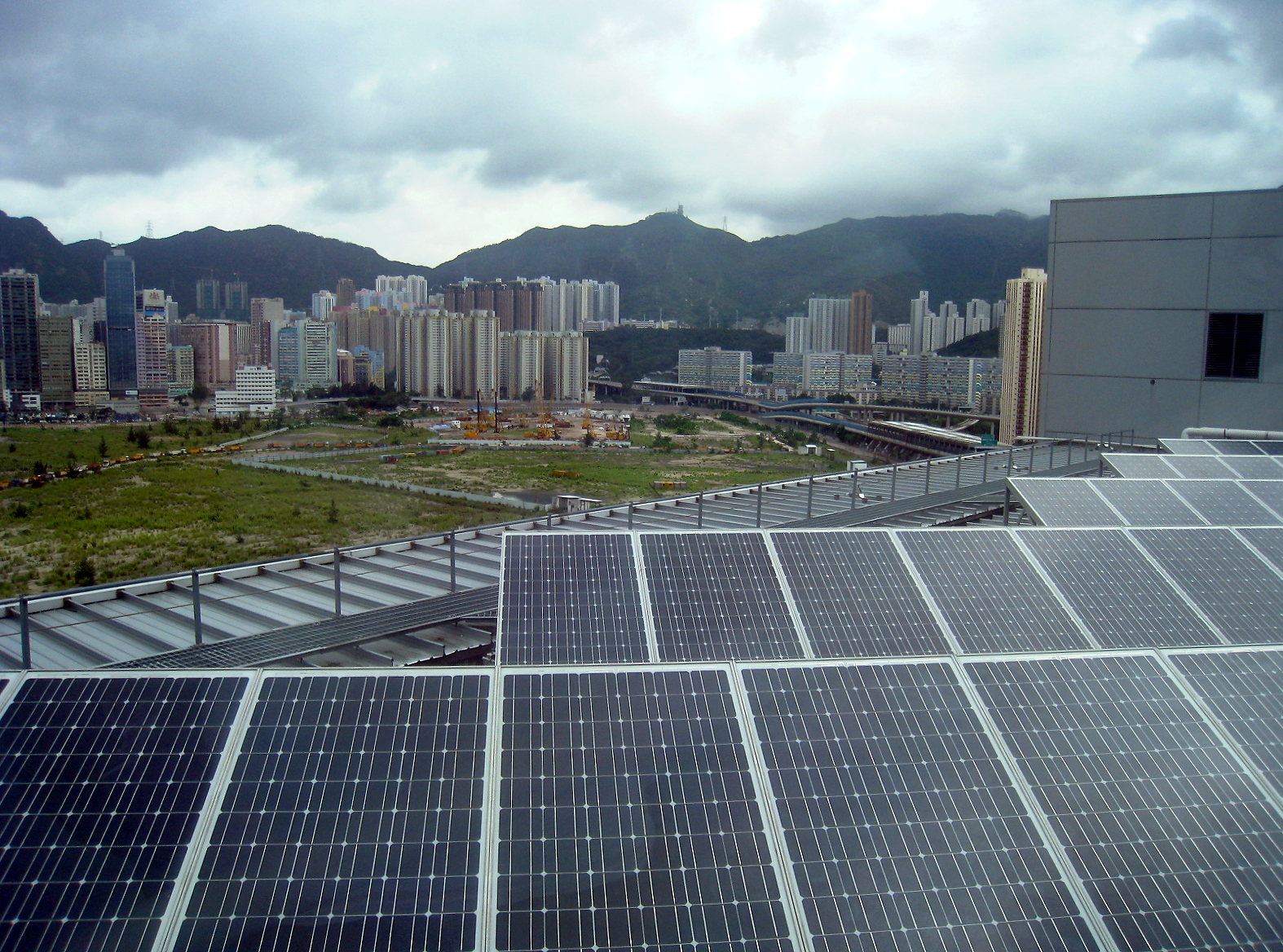
Rooftop solar in Hong Kong

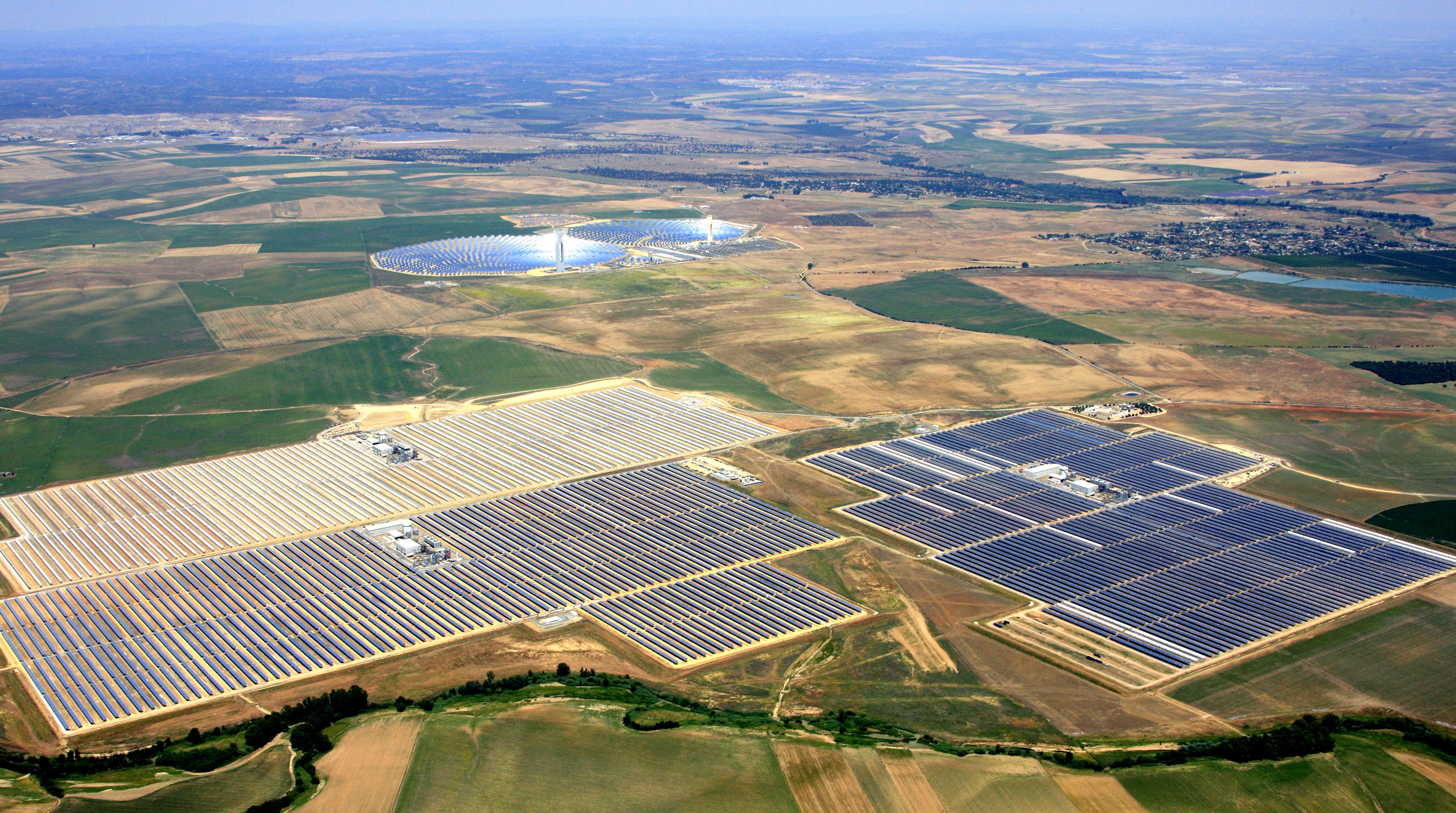
The first three concentrated solar power (CSP) units of Spain's Solnova Solar Power Station in the foreground, with the PS10 and PS20 solar power towers in the background

Solar power, also known as solar electricity, is the conversion of energy from sunlight into electricity, either directly using photovoltaics (PV) or indirectly using concentrated solar power. Solar panels use the photovoltaic effect to convert light into an electric current. Concentrated solar power systems use lenses or mirrors and solar tracking systems to focus a large area of sunlight to a hot spot, often to drive a steam turbine.

Photovoltaics (PV) were initially solely used as a source of electricity for small and medium-sized applications, from the calculator powered by a single solar cell to remote homes powered by an off-grid rooftop PV system. Commercial concentrated solar power plants were first developed in the 1980s. Since then, as the cost of solar panels has fallen, grid-connected solar PV systems' capacity and production have doubled about every three years. Three-quarters of new generation capacity is solar, with both millions of rooftop installations and gigawatt-scale photovoltaic power stations continuing to be built.

In 2025, solar power generated 9% of global electricity. In 2024, solar generated 7% of global electricity and over 1% of primary energy (2.7% by the substitution method), adding twice as much new electricity as coal. Along with onshore wind power, utility-scale solar is the source with the cheapest levelised cost of electricity for new installations in most countries. Almost half the solar power installed in 2022 was mounted on rooftops. China is currently the largest producer and installer of solar power capacity; globally, it produces 98% of solar wafers, 92% of solar cells and 85% of solar panels, and accounted for more than 55% of global installed solar capacity in the first half of 2025.

Much more low-carbon power is needed for electrification and to limit climate change. The International Energy Agency said in 2022 that more effort was needed for grid integration and the mitigation of policy, regulation and financing challenges. Nevertheless solar may greatly cut the cost of energy. Solar is important for energy security.

== Computational sustainability ==
Computational sustainability is an emerging field that attempts to balance societal, economic, and environmental resources for the future well-being of humanity using methods from mathematics, computer science, and information science fields. Sustainability in this context refers to the world's ability to sustain biological, social, and environmental systems in the long term.

Using the power of computers to process large quantities of information, decision making algorithms allocate resources based on real-time information. Applications advanced by this field are widespread across various areas. For example, artificial intelligence and machine learning techniques are created to promote long-term biodiversity conservation and species protection. Smart grids implement renewable resources and storage capabilities to control the production and expenditure of energy. Intelligent transportation system technologies can analyze road conditions and relay information to drivers so they can make smarter, more environmentally-beneficial decisions based on real-time traffic information.

=== Sustainable Agriculture ===
Sustainable agriculture is an approach to farming that utilizes technology in a way that ensures food protection, while ensuring the long-term health and productivity of agricultural systems, ecosystems, and communities. Historically, technological advancements have significantly contributed to increasing agricultural productivity and reducing physical labor.

The National Institute of Food and Agriculture improves sustainable agriculture through the use of funded programs aimed at fulfilling human food and fiber needs, improving environmental quality, and preserving natural resources vital to the agricultural economy, optimizing the utilization of both nonrenewable and on-farm resources while integrating natural biological cycles and controls as appropriate, maintaining the economic viability of farm operations, and to foster an improved quality of life for farmers and society at large. Among its initiatives, the NIFA wants to improve farm and ranch practices, integrated pest management, rotational grazing, soil conservation, water quality/wetlands, cover crops, crop/landscape diversity, nutrient management, agroforestry, and alternative marketing.

== Education ==
Courses aimed at developing graduates with some specific skills in environmental systems or environmental technology are becoming more common and fall into three broad classes:

- Environmental Engineering or Environmental Systems courses oriented towards a civil engineering approach in which structures and the landscape are constructed to blend with or protect the environment;
- Environmental chemistry, sustainable chemistry or environmental chemical engineering courses oriented towards understanding the effects (good and bad) of chemicals in the environment. Such awards can focus on mining processes pollutants and commonly also cover biochemical processes;
- Environmental technology courses are oriented towards producing electronic, electrical, or electrotechnology graduates capable of developing devices and artifacts that can monitor, measure, model, and control environmental impact, including monitoring and managing energy generation from renewable sources and developing novel energy generation technologies.

== See also ==
- Appropriate technology
- Bright green environmentalism
- Eco-innovation
- Ecological modernization
- Ecosia
- Ecotechnology
- Environmentally friendly
- Environmental sustainable innovation
- Green development
- Groasis Waterboxx
- Ice house (building)
- Information and communication technologies for environmental sustainability
- Pulser Pump
- Smog tower
- Sustainable design
- Sustainable energy
- Sustainable engineering
- Sustainable living
- Sustainable technologies
- Technology for sustainable development
- The All-Earth Ecobot Challenge
- Windcatcher
- WIPO GREEN
