= Bricx Command Center =

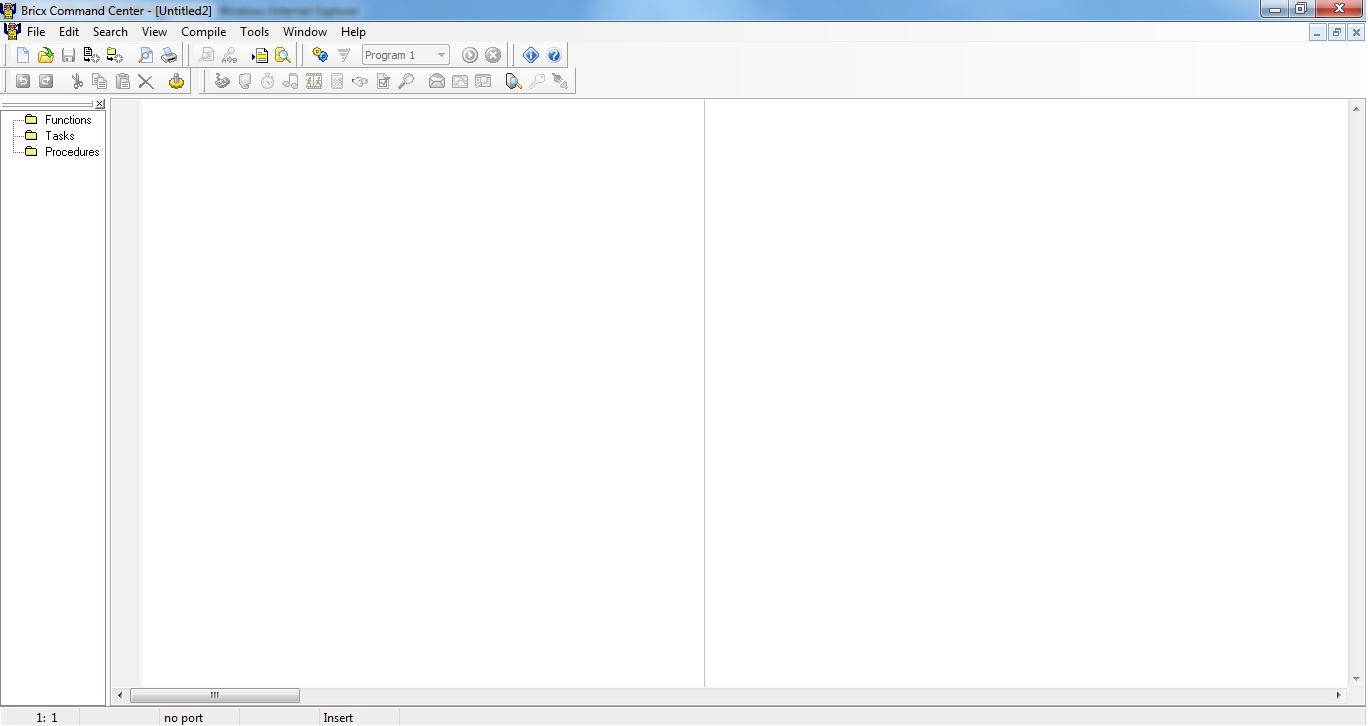
- Screenshot of Bricx Command Center
- Developer(s): John Hansen
- Stable release: 3.3.8.8 / 2010-06-29
- Operating system: Microsoft Windows
- License: MPL 1.1/MPL 1.0
- Website: bricxcc.sourceforge.net

Bricx Command Center (BricxCC) is the integrated development environment (IDE) of Next Byte Codes (NBC), Not Quite C (NQC) and Not eXactly C (NXC). These programming languages are used to program the Robots in the Lego Mindstorms series. Not Quite C and Not eXactly C have a syntax like C. Bricx Command Center is currently limited to computers running the Microsoft Windows operating system. However, a version for the Linux operating system is currently in development. It is written by John Hansen.

== Custom firmware ==
Unlike other programming languages for the Lego Mindstorms series like ROBOTC, custom firmware is not needed. However, it is needed when the Lego Mindstorms NXT Intelligent Brick must connect with Bricx Command Center via Bluetooth or when increasing robot performance and functionality (various NBC/NXC Enhanced Firmware exclusive syscalls).

== See also ==
- Lego Mindstorms
- Lego Mindstorms NXT
- Lego Mindstorms NXT 2.0
- Not eXactly C (NXC)
- Next Byte Codes (NBC)
- Not Quite C (NQC)
