= CubeStormer II =

CubeStormer II is a robot built primarily with Lego Mindstorms and a Samsung Galaxy S2 for solving a Rubik's Cube. The project was commissioned by ARM Holdings and designed and built by Mike Dobson and David Gilday.

CubeStormer II set a Guinness World Record of 5.270s for the fastest robot solving a Rubik's Cube on 11 November 2011 in the presence of the editor-in-chief of Guinness World Records in Wired.co.uk's offices in London.

The record has already been beaten by its successor, the CubeStormer III, which is controlled by a Samsung Galaxy S4, the new record is now 3.253 seconds.
