= Dexter Industries =

American robot design company

- Type: Privately held company
- Industry: Robotics Education
- Founded: 2009
- Headquarters: Boulder, Colorado, United States
- Area served: Worldwide
- Products: Robots, Sensors for the Raspberry Pi, LEGO Mindstorms, and Arduino.
- Website: www.dexterindustries.com

Dexter Industries is a company that designs robots for education, research, and personal use. The company makes several products that expand the LEGO Mindstorms, Raspberry Pi, and Arduino prototype systems.

== History ==
Dexter Industries was founded in July 2009 by a group of engineers with an interest in robotics. Their first product was the dSwitch, and they have since created several robots for the Raspberry Pi, Arduino, and Lego Mindstorms NXT systems. Dexter Industries is located in the Washington, D.C. area.

The company has launched a series of Kickstarter campaigns to raise funding for their Raspberry Pi robots.

In July 2019, Dexter Industries was acquired by Modular Robotics, a robotics company in Boulder, Colorado, for an undisclosed amount. Its headquarters were moved to Boulder.

== Raspberry Pi Accessories ==
Dexter Industries designs and manufactures accessory boards for the Raspberry Pi.

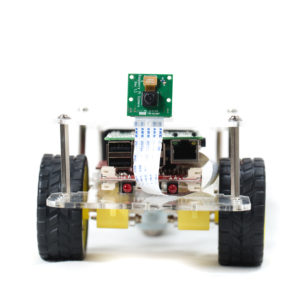
The GoPiGo with a Raspberry Pi Camera attached

GoPiGo - The GoPiGo is a robotic platform for the Raspberry Pi. The GoPiGo is designed to be a complete robot package for the Raspberry Pi. The package includes a robot body, motors, controls, and a robotic power supply. The GoPiGo was launched with a Kickstarter campaign in 2014. The second version of the GoPiGo was launched in 2015 with a subscription program for projects and sensors.

The GoPiGo has been used by a number of companies, including Google and Amazon, to demonstrate their artificial intelligence platforms.

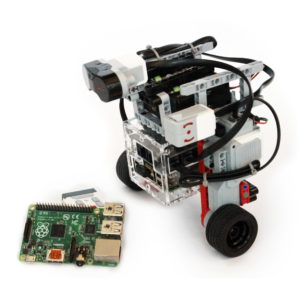
The BrickPi3 in a Balance Robot made of LEGO Mindstorms

BrickPi - The BrickPi is a robotic system add-on board for the Raspberry Pi. This board allows a user to connect LEGO Mindstorms parts, motors, and sensors to the Raspberry Pi. The company funded the launch of the BrickPi with a Kickstarter campaign in June 2013. In 2016, the company announced the 3rd generation of the BrickPi, BrickPi3, with full support for LEGO EV3 sensors.

Arduberry - The Arduberry is an add-on board for the Raspberry Pi that connects Arduino Shields to the Raspberry Pi.

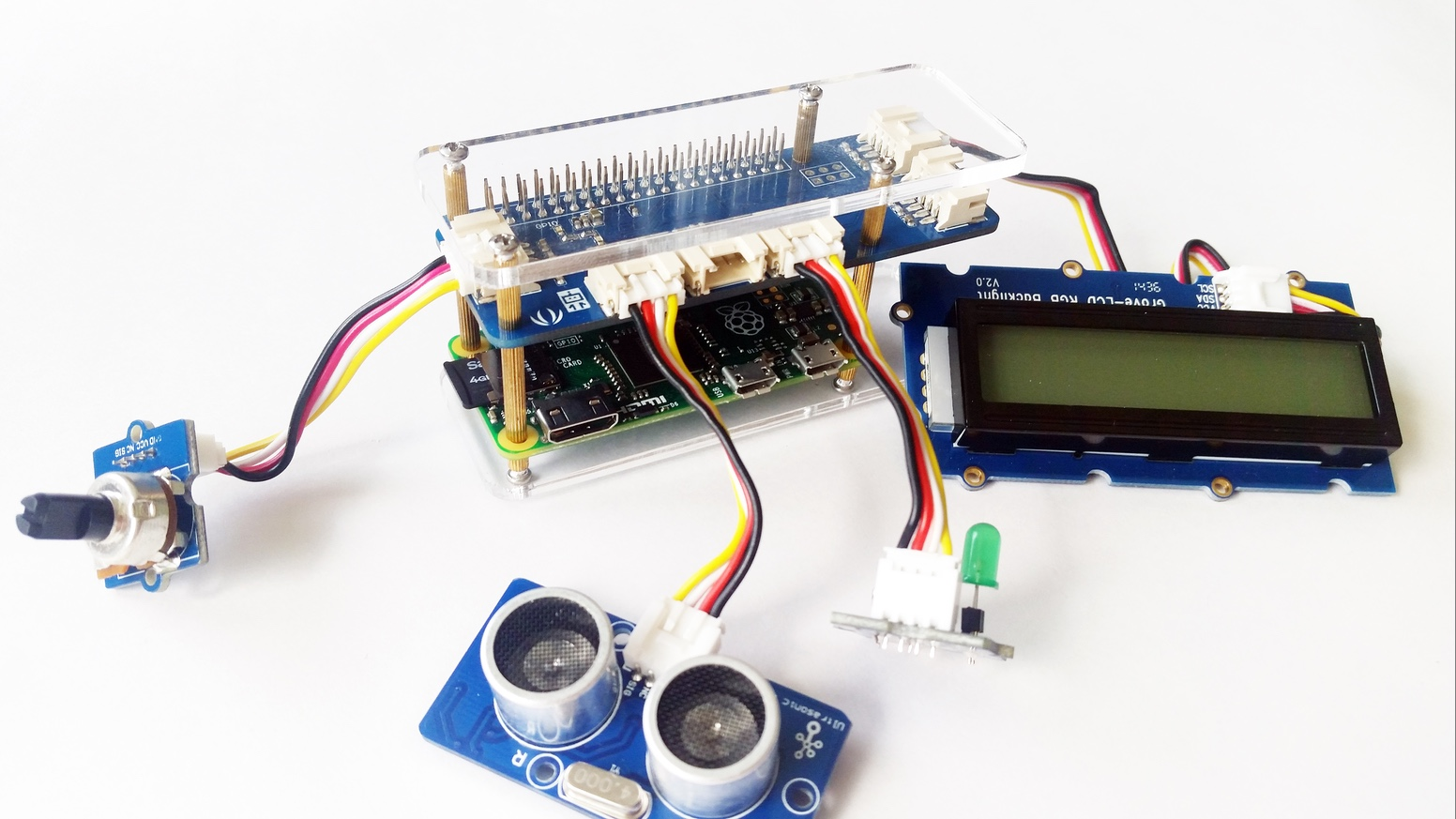
The GrovePi Zero attached to the Raspberry Pi Zero

GrovePi - The GrovePi is an add-on board for the Raspberry Pi that connects modular sensors to the Raspberry Pi. GrovePi was developed and launched in partnership with Seeed Studio, an electronics manufacturer. The GrovePi has been used in a number of Internet of Things devices with the Raspberry Pi.

PivotPi - The PivotPi is a servo controller for the Raspberry Pi. The PivotPi can control up to 8 servos with the Raspberry Pi. The PivotPI can be programmed in Scratch, Python, and C.

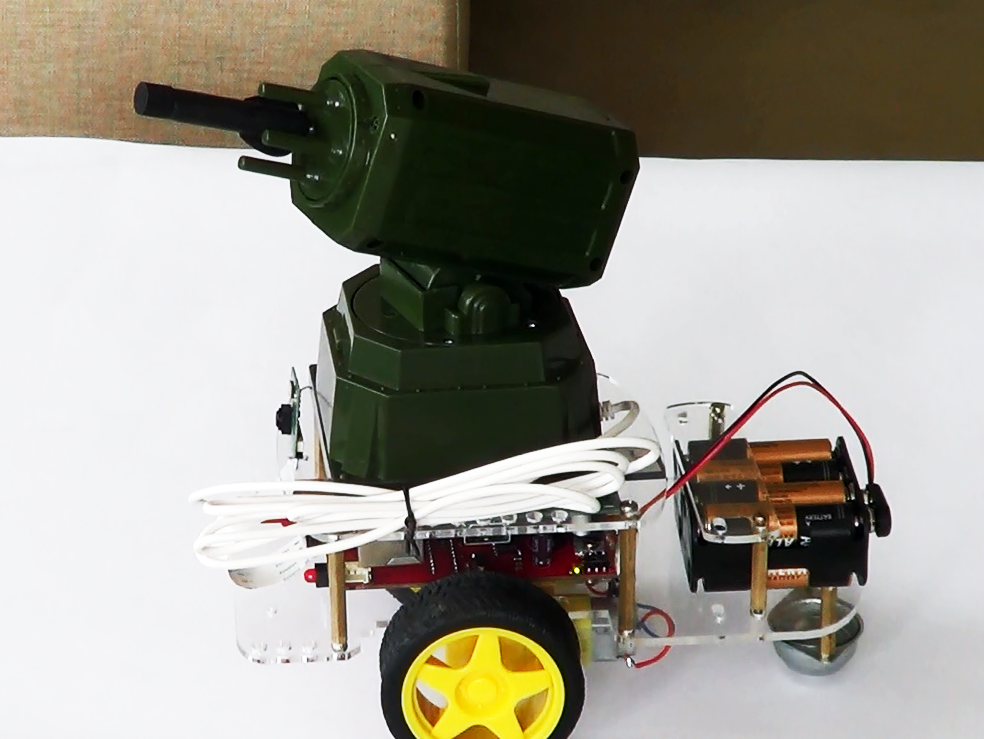
The GoPiGo Raspberry Pi Robot with a USB rocket launcher attached

== Lego Sensors ==
Dexter Industries produces a flexible motion sensor, a pressure sensor, a temperature sensors, a solar sensor, a GPS sensor, an XBee radio sensor, and others.

=== Flexible Sensor ===
The dFlex is the flexible sensor available from Dexter Industries. This sensor measures the bend of the sensor and records mechanical motion. dFlex is the newest product from Dexter Industries and is reviewed on several robotics blogs.

=== Temperature Sensors ===
For the temperature sensors, there are two versions: an open version and a protected version. The sensors come with a two meter long cord. The temperature sensors are thermistor-based; they are read as an analog sensor by the NXT.

=== Pressure Sensor ===
The dPressure sensor is made specifically for the Lego NXT Mindstorms system. It is capable of measuring up to 250 kPa (30 psi) and 500 kPa (70 psi) of pressure and gauge vacuum.

=== Solar Sensor ===
For the dSolar sensor, there are two 9V versions with different wattages: a 2W and a 4W model, both of which can power the NXT system or a user's robot. Dexter Industries also produces three additional adapters that relate to the solar sensor. The first is an optional capacitor bank that serves as a mini-battery; it provides continuous power for NXT projects if the system runs under a shadow or cloud. Second, there is an adapter that allows three solar panels to be plugged in simultaneously; this can provide up to 750 mA at 10 volts. The third adapter is a battery pack that can recharge the NXT battery pack utilizing solar power.

=== Global Positioning System (GPS) Sensor ===
The dGPS sensor provides GPS coordinate information to the user's robot and calculates navigation information. The sensor provides latitude, longitude, time, speed and heading to the user's project or robot. Since the LEGO NXT has limited computing capability and can't interface directly with a GPS module, the sensor includes a micro-controller and software that translates and checks the signal from the GPS, and also performs additional calculations and functions to aid navigation. The sensor can be used to build autonomous vehicles and mapping vehicles.

==== Compatibility with Google Maps ====
The dGPS output data is compatible with Google Maps. A miniature version of the Google Street View Car, which roams the streets to photograph them for Google Maps, was built by Mark Crosbie. He created his Street View car using Dexter Industries’ dGPS sensor to record coordinates and a small camera to take pictures as the vehicle drives down a street. The pictures from the camera can then be uploaded into Google Earth along with the coordinates. Using a KML format file, the Lego NXT can upload saved pictures, coordinates and data into a personal computer. Crosbie's miniature Google Street Car can show the path that the car drove, and also shows pictures taken along the way in Google Earth.

==== Educational Applications ====
An educational workbook for the dGPS, entitled "Beginning GPS with NXT Robots" was written and published by James Floyd Kelly in June 2011. This book includes instructional projects with questions and descriptions that teach students about mapping, robotics, programming and navigational terms. "Beginning GPS with NXT Robots" is an introduction to the basics of GPS, including hands-on activities and tutorials on how to use the features of the dGPS sensor in NXT robotic projects.

==== Geocaching ====
According to Geocaching.com, "geocaching is a high-tech treasure hunting game played throughout the world by adventure seekers equipped with GPS devices. The basic idea is to locate hidden containers, called geocaches, outdoors and then share your experiences online." By using the NXT and the dGPS sensor, the user is able to create a hand held GPS. The accompanying dGPS geocaching software takes GPS coordinates of a target in decimal-degrees, references them against the coordinates of the NXT's current position, and then calculates the distance the NXT is from its destination as well as the compass angle. By turning the NXT hand held GPS in the correct direction according to the embedded compass, the user can reach the geocache. The software also allows the user to record the latitude and longitude to plot the user's journey in Google Maps.

=== NXTBee ===
The NXTBee is a high-speed long-distance wireless communication sensor which allows a Lego NXT to communicate with any other device with an XBee radio. The NXTBee sensor makes the Digi XBee radio compatible with the Lego Mindstorms NXT system. The XBee 802.15 communication protocol is the wireless communication standard used by many robots and for inter-device communication. There are two types of NXTBees; the basic NXTBee can send information up to 300 feet away, and the NXTBee PRO can transmit or receive information from up to 1.2 km away. The NXTBee utilizes a high speed RS-485 line for high speed communication. The NXTBee uses the XBee protocol, which can utilize both point-to-point protocol (PPP) networking and mesh networking. Users can design a remote controlled car using the NXTBee.

==== Swarm Robotics ====
Carnegie Mellon University’s Robotics Academy developed a multi-robot swarm robotics project using the NXTBee and the Lego Mindstorms system. Swarm robotics is a popular topic in robotics because it coordinates numerous small robots to accomplish larger tasks. Swarm robotics using the NXT and NXTBee might be capable of performing complex tasks such as PID auto-straightening, thermal imaging and even line tracking. CMU's Robotics Academy also teaches how to use the NXTBee at its advanced program training courses.

=== Thermal Infrared Sensor ===
The Thermal Infrared Sensor reads the surface temperatures of objects. It is a non-contact thermometer and does not need to be in contact with an object to measure its temperature. The sensor can read object temperatures between -90 °F and 700 °F (-70 °C and +380 °C). The sensor can read temperatures more than double the amounts other NXT thermometers measure. The sensor has a high accuracy of 0.5 °C and a resolution of 0.02 °C. The Thermal Infrared sensor reads both the ambient temperature and the surface temperature of the object that the sensor is pointed towards. The sensor uses I2C protocol to communicate with the Mindstorms NXT. The sensor can detect a flame at a range of 2 meters.

=== dWIFI ===
Dexter Industries released the WiFi sensor called the dWIFI in November 2011. The dWifi release was accompanied by a week-long instructional blogging campaign aimed at walking novices through the process. The dWifi enables the NXT to transmit and receive information wirelessly between a computer and itself. The sensor operates with standard 802.11 b/g/n access and can be configured to run on the vast majority of home networks. The Dexter Industries dWIFIs sensor connects to the NXT via the high speed communications Port 4 and is powered by an external 9V battery. The sensor comes with security options and is able to connect with WPA2-PSK, WPA, and WEP security networks. Users of the dWifi can "tweet" information from the Mindstorms NXT to Twitter. In February 2012, a dWiFi user released instructions on how to expand the range of the dWifi by using a High Gain Ariel.

=== Inertial Motion Unit ===
The Inertial Motion Unit (IMU) sensor combines an accelerometer and a gyroscope in one sensor. The sensor has six degrees of freedom, measuring x, y, and z axes for both the gyroscope and the accelerometer. IMU users can create a "Segway" NXT, which enables a robot to stand on its tires and move in 360 degrees around its axis. In conjunction with Lego Mindstorms' NXT Ultrasonic Sensor, the robot can be trained to simultaneously sense and avoid obstacles.

=== dCompass ===
The dCompass is a compass sensor for Mindstorms NXT. This compact sensor detects magnetic fields for navigation and works on all three axes. Using a magnetic sensor, the sensor is able to measure the Earth's magnetic field and returns a magnetic heading, showing which way your robot is heading. The device can be used without calibration or, if needed, can be calibrated with software to account for magnetic fields to deliver a highly accurate compass heading. The sensor is supported in NXT-G, Labview, and ROBOTC. The sensor communicates with the NXT via I2C and can be placed on any port.

== Switches ==
The dSwitch is designed to control household appliances. The device acts as a switch, allowing a NXT invention to control power sources. The device may be used for turning on a power function based on temperature thresholds. The device may also be used for other means, such as an automated battery recharger.

== Software ==
Dexter Industries has developed an operating system based on Raspbian Operation System for robotics. The project is open source and can be downloaded for free.

The company supports a number of open source software projects based on Python, C, Java, and other programming languages.

In the past, Dexter Industries developed third-party software for support of the Lego Mindstorms NXT and EV3 robotics systems. The company also works with other developers to create driver software for their products.
