= Braigo =

Braille embosser using a Lego Mindstorms EV3 kit

Braigo (Brai-lle +Le-go) is a Braille printer design. Braigo version 1.0 uses a Lego Mindstorms EV3 kit, which includes a microprocessor with assorted components such as electric motors, sensors and actuators. Braigo v1.0 was designed by 13-year-old Shubham Banerjee in January 2014, as an entry in 7th grade school science fair project. The model was based on the PLOTT3R, a bonus model released with the EV3 kit and originally designed by Ralph Hempel. The cost was said to be about US$350 or 250 Euros for the Lego Mindstorms EV3 kit and some extra commonly used hardware whereas a conventional Braille printer retails starting from about $1,900.

In August 2014, a new company called Braigo Labs Inc. was formed with an office in Palo Alto, California. Since Shubham Banerjee was a minor, his mother Malini is listed as the President of the company and the law firm Inventus Law acting as advisor.

On September 9, 2014, at the Intel Developers Forum (IDF 2014), Banerjee demonstrated 'Braigo v2.0'. As of at least February 2018 the product has still not been released and there have been no official announcements since 2018.

== The inventor ==
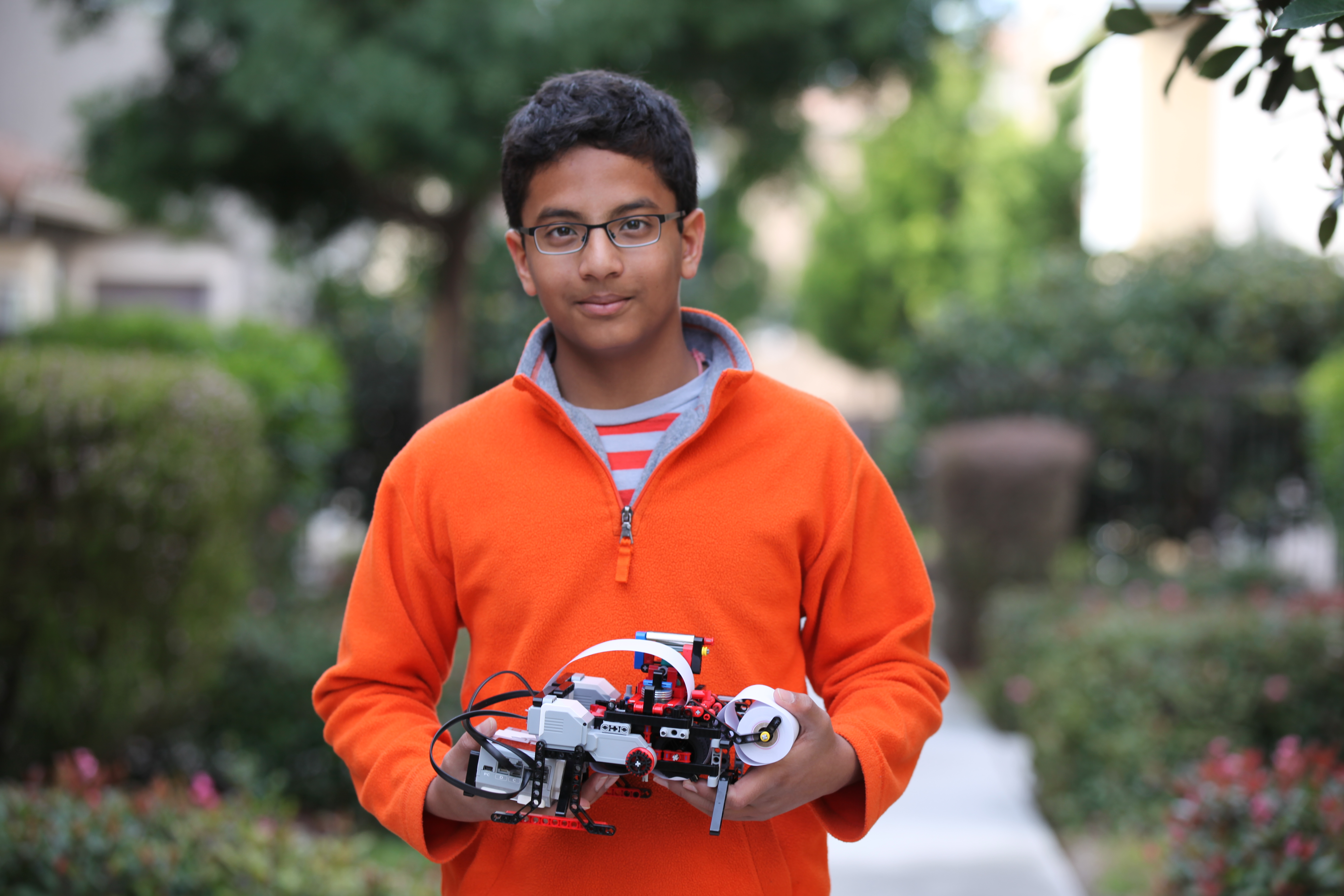
Inventor Shubham Banerjee with Braigo v1.0

Shubham Banerjee was born in Hasselt, Belgium. The family moved to San Jose, California, when he was four years old. Later he moved to Santa Clara, California, and completed his elementary schooling at Don Callejon School. He joined Magnolia Science Academy in Santa Clara in middle school for a couple of months, before moving to Champion School in San Jose for middle school. He lives in Santa Clara, California, with his parents and Older sister.

== Braigo v1.0 ==
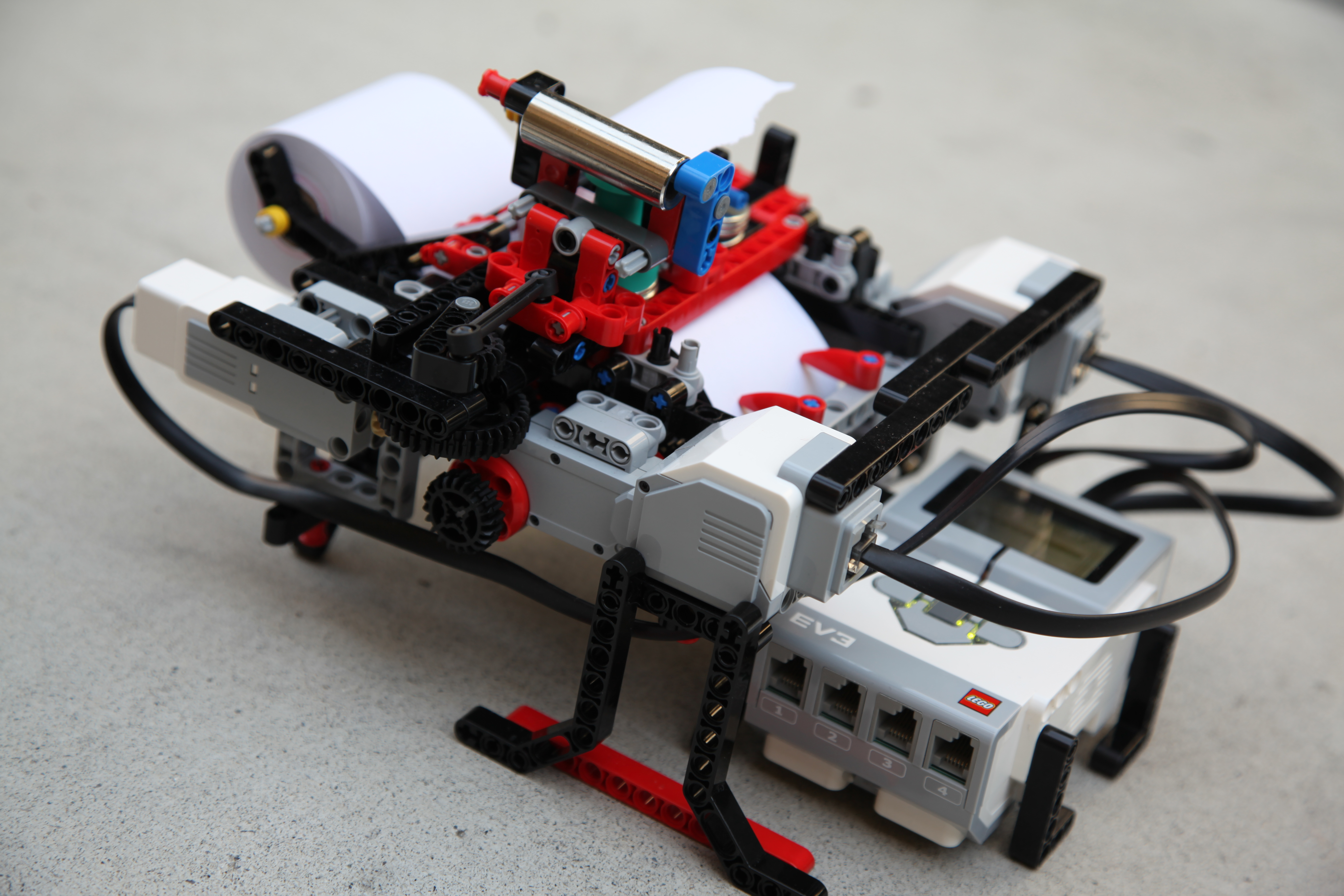
Braigo - Braille Printer with Lego Mindstorms EV3

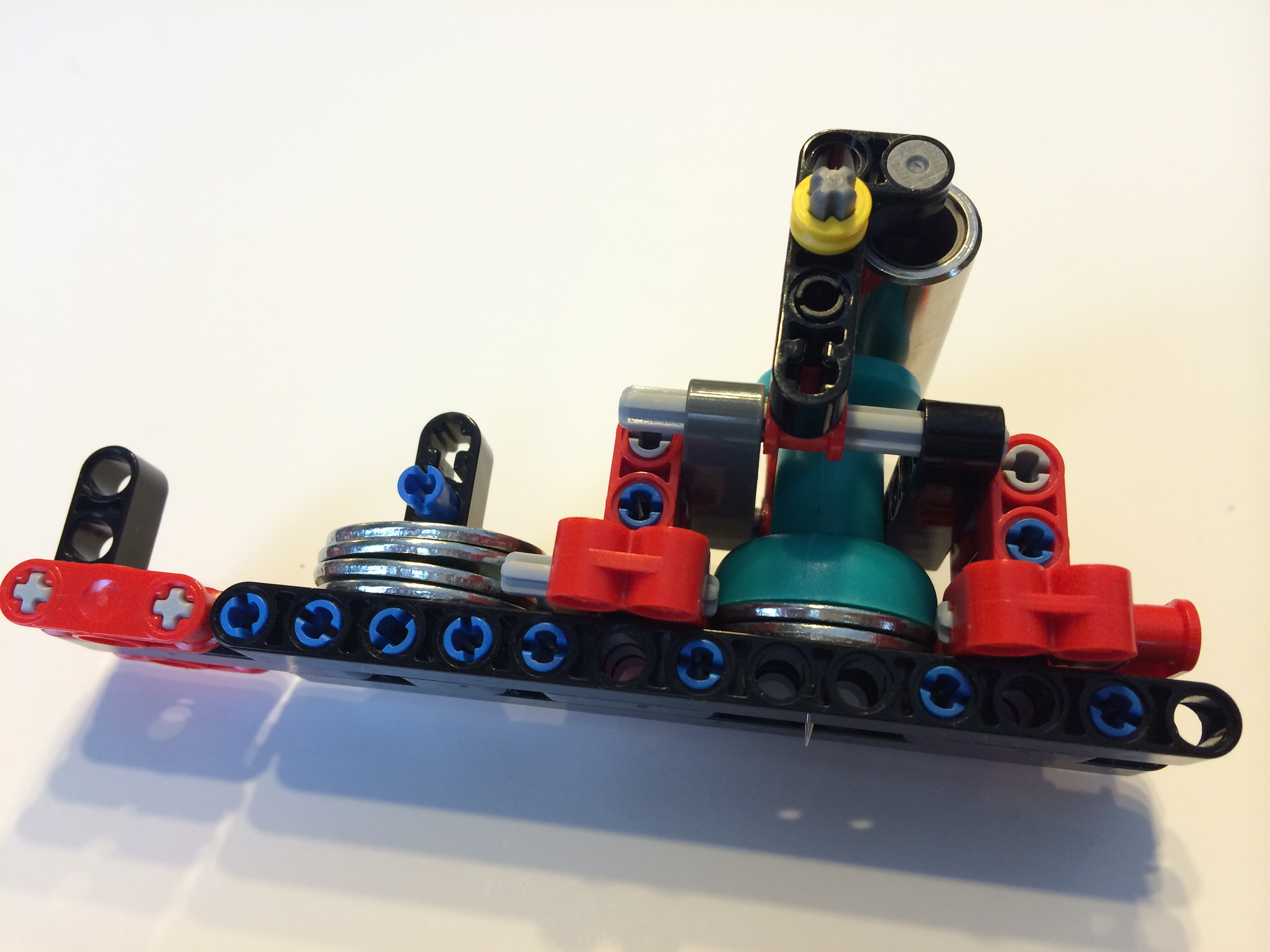
Braigo Braille Print Head

Braigo v1.0 made Open Source

As announced in a CNN and other interviews, Banerjee has decided to give away the design and software for free. He said on an NBC program "I think I'm doing something that could actually help people". He has uploaded building instruction on his YouTube channel, and also uploaded the software project file .ev3 on the LegoMindstorms EV3 community page. He said that "I think Braigo making the news will rejuvenate others and the beneficiary will be the visually impaired individuals. All good for humankind." Detailed download and build information is available on-line and detailed directions on how to build Braigo were published in Makezine.

== Braigo v2.0 ==
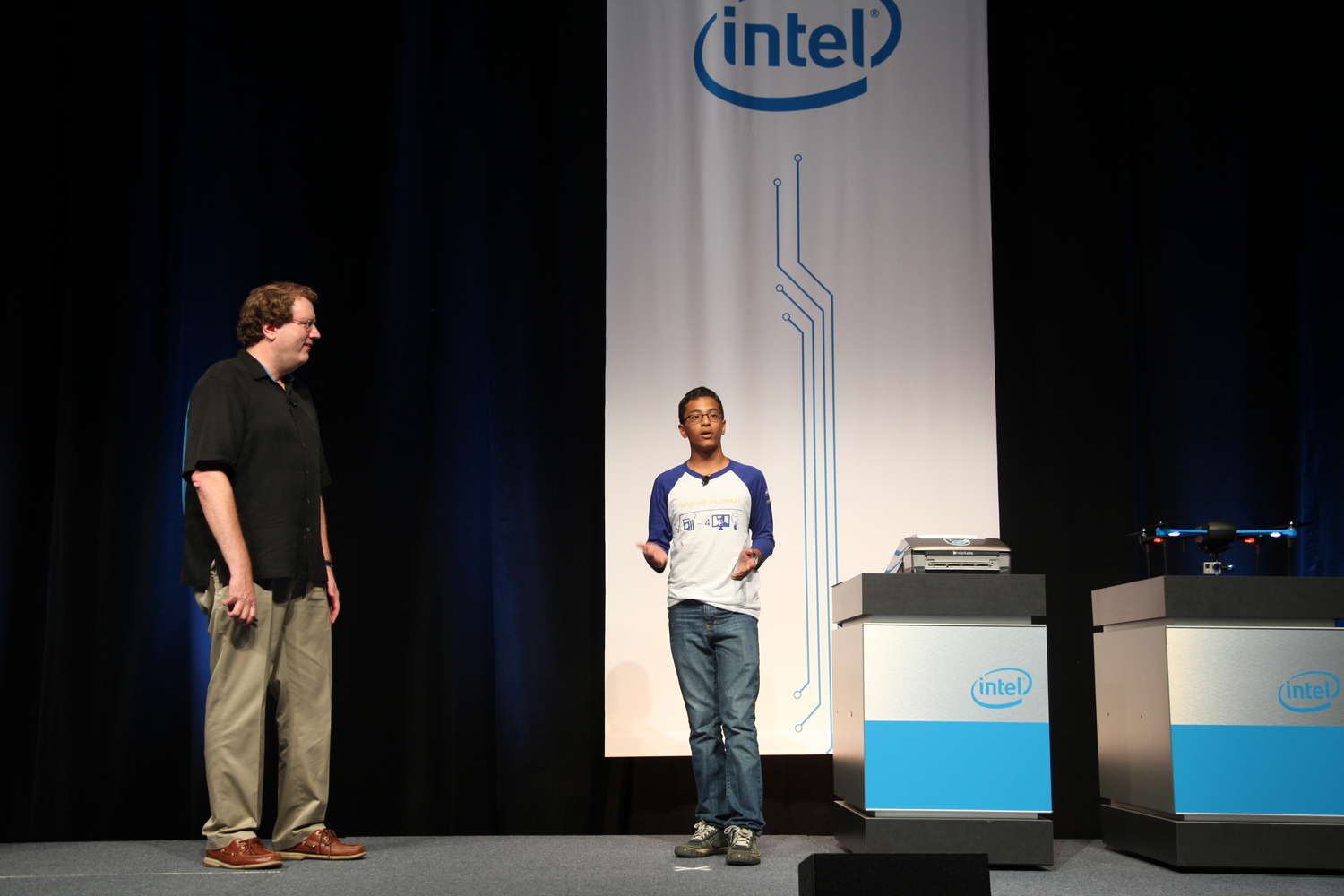
Banerjee on stage with Mike Bell, Intel Corporate VP & GM - New Devices Group, at the keynote in IDF14 showing Braigo v2.0

On September 9, 2014, at the Intel Developer Forum (IDF 2014) Mega Session: The Next Revolution in Computing: Edison, Wearables, and New Devices with Intel VP and GM, Mike Bell, Banerjee demonstrated Braigo 2.0. Braigo 2.0 promises to be the world's first, relatively inexpensive, silent, IOT enabled, light weight, consumer oriented, braille printer or embosser. Braigo 2.0 reportedly contains new patent pending technology in addition to Intel's Edison Chip paired with a development board.

After Braigo v1.0, the natural progression for Banerjee, after feedback from the visually impaired community, was to make a real consumer version that could eventually be bought off-the-shelf.

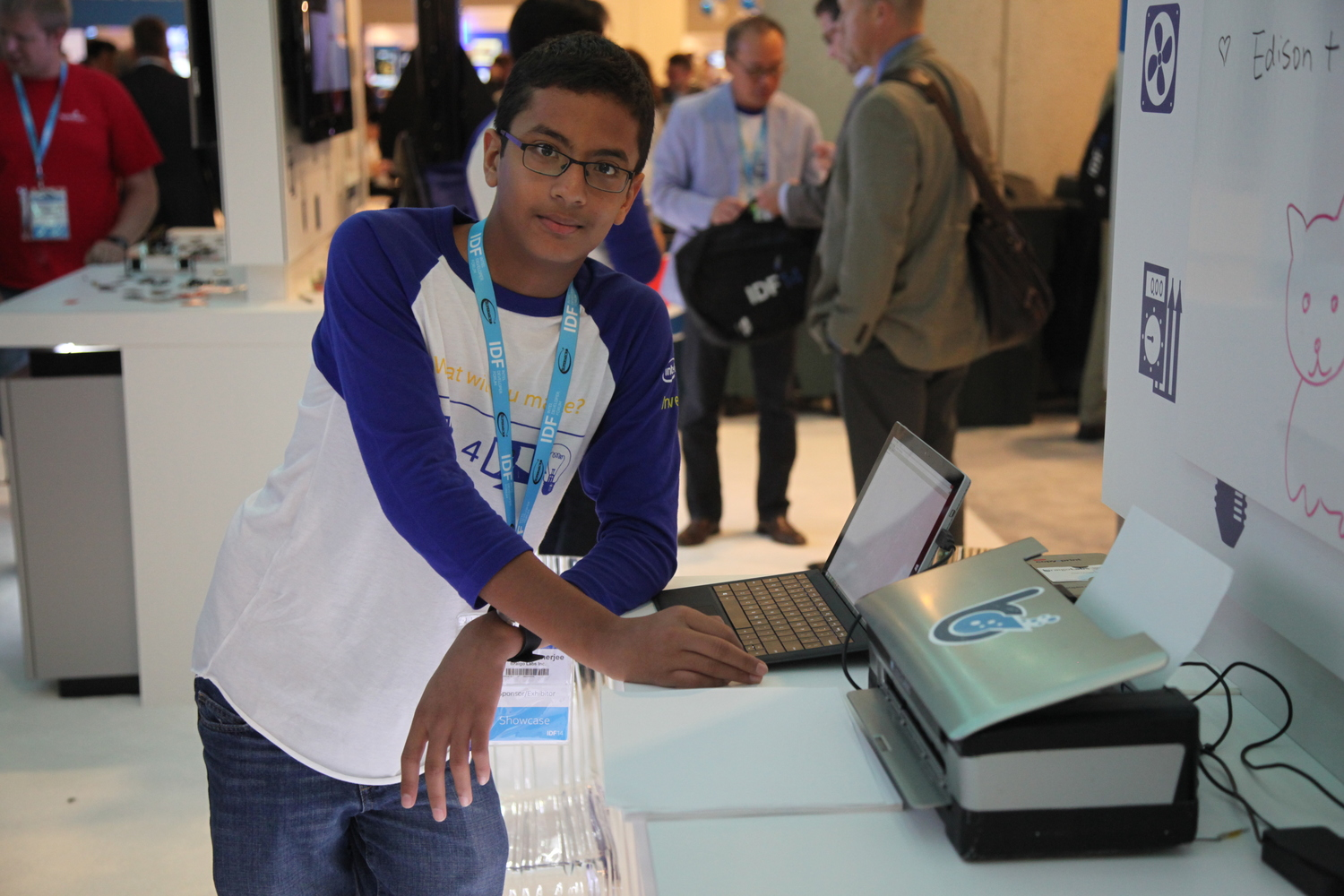
Banerjee with Braigo v2.0 at IDF14

== Transcoding of documents to braille on-chip ==
At Campus Party Keynote in São Paulo, Brazil, in February 2015. Shubham Banerjee gave a demonstration of a new method of transcoding documents to braille without any software installation on the computer. The technology involves uploading any document from a computer into the memory of the Intel's Edison chip that's the brain of the Braigo Braille printer. The idea behind this new method is to reduce the cost of ownership of the Braigo printer without having to buy any transcribing software for braille.

== Awards/Recognitions ==
Year	What	From
2015	2015 Next Generation of STEM Leaders	US News
2015	2015 Invention Award	Popular Science
2015	20 under 20	Veckans Affärer
2015	40 under 40	Silicon Valley Business Journal
2014	Nominet Trust 100 Winner	Nominet Trust
2014	Technology Innovation of the Year	Trusted Reviews Time Inc. UK
2014	25th anniversary of the Convention on the Rights of the Child	UNICEF publication (ISBN 978-92-806-4780-8) "Reimagine the Future: Innovation for every child"
2014	Certificate of Recognition	California State Assembly Member Bob Wieckowski
2014	Best of America	Reader's Digest
2014	Winner of 2014 Synopsys Outreach Foundation n+1 Prize	Synopsys Outreach Foundation, Inc.
2014	Lego Build 4 Good Challenge (Inspired by Braigo) - Seattle	Lego
2014	2014 Youth Innovator Award	OPEN Silicon Valley
2014	NBC & AACI APA Heritage Month Honoree 2014	NBC & AACI
2014	Special Congressional Recognition	Mike Honda
2014	Maker Faire Editor's Choice Ribbon	Maker Faire
2014	White House Maker Faire 2014	White House
2014	The Queen Latifah Show & Lego Trophy	The Queen Latifah Show
2014	Honorable Mention	The Tech Awards

== Creation of Braigo Labs Inc. ==
In August 2014, Braigo Labs Inc. was formed with Banerjee announcing that he is working on his next version of the Braille Printer and named it as Braigo v2.0. Since he is a minor, his mother Malini Banerjee is named as the President of the company with him listed as Founder. Braigo and BraigoLabs are both now registered trademarks of Braigo Labs Inc. The offices of the company is located in Palo Alto, California.

=== Intel Capital Investment ===
Intel was so impressed with Banerjee's efforts that Mike Bell, Intel's VP and GM of New Products Group announced at Intel Developer Forum (IDF 2014) that Intel will invest in Braigo Labs Inc. to help bring the printer to market. In Intel Capital Global Summit 2014, it was announced that they have closed the seed investment round for Braigo Labs Inc. founded by Shubham Banerjee,

=== Youngest entrepreneur to receive Venture Capital funding ===
On November 4, 2014, at the Intel Capital Global Summit, Intel Capital announced that they have funded Braigo Labs Inc. the startup founded by Shubham Banerjee. CBS News' John Blackstone reports, "the eighth grader is already a star; the youngest person ever to get venture capital investment for a start-up", reports CBS News correspondent John Blackstone

In an article in The Wall Street Journal titled "Intel Capital's Arvind Sodhani: Unique Companies 'Rarer and Rarer'" on November 4, 2014, journalist Deborah Gage asked the question "You've been at Intel Capital for a long time. How much longer are you going to keep doing this?", Arvid Sodhani answered "I'm having fun. We're having a successful year. The fun part is meeting people like Shubham Banerjee who are passionate about pursuing their dreams and feeling comfortable that this is a risky business. It's not just a risk for us, but the individuals doing this are taking a risk at a personal level. I like pinpointing the risk—it's rewarding to have a success down the road." As reported by Johnny Dodd, reporter from People magazine, "'We've funded young entrepreneurs, but no one this young – certainly not in middle school,' a spokesman for Intel Capital says. The venture-capital firm recently announced an investment deal with Banerjee's company, Braigo Labs, that one source estimates is worth several hundred thousand dollars."

=== Microsoft Relationship ===
Shubham Banerjee was invited by Microsoft for their Student Tech Fair on May 13, 2015, in New York City to display his work with Braigo. After the event Microsoft published that Shubham is working with the Windows team at Microsoft to integrate the Braigo with the Windows 10 for easy integration of the solution that he is developing. "Now Shubham is working to bring the Braigo 2.0 to market. He's started working with my colleagues on the Windows team to integrate Braigo drivers with Windows for easy deployment."
