= Cubestormer 3 =

- Cubestormer3 one second after breaking the world record

CubeStormer 3 is a robot built primarily with Lego Mindstorms and the Samsung Galaxy S4. On 15 March 2014, at the Big Bang fair in Birmingham, England, the CubeStormer 3 broke the previous record, held by its predecessor, the CubeStormer II, for the fastest time to solve a Rubik's Cube. The previous Guinness World Records time was 5.270 seconds. The official time taken to solve the Rubik's Cube by the CubeStormer 3 was 3.253 seconds. This robot was created by inventors David Gilday and Mike Dobson. It took the two of them 18 months to perfect the technology of this robot. The robot was able to conquer the cube by use of four robotic hands. The robot is made out of LEGO and ARM architecture.

Gilday and Dobson expressed a desire to beat their record with a faster robot in the future.
