= History of Lego =

Lego began in 1932 in the carpentry workshop of Ole Kirk Christiansen, a Danish furniture maker. During the Great Depression, he began to make miniature versions of his products, which inspired him to produce toys. In 1934 the company was named "LEGO", a contraction from the Danish phrase "leg Godt", meaning "play well".

In 1947, after World War II, when injection molding was introduced to Denmark, Christiansen bought an injection molding machine for the company to make toys. That same year, he and his son obtained samples of plastic, interlocking Kiddicraft bricks, which inspired the first Lego brick created in 1936. The Lego bricks in its present form, with hollow tubes in the underside for better interlocking capability, was patented in 1958. Over the decades, the Lego system continued to be modified, with new molds and colors being added and removed.

Today, Lego is a profitable brand offering construction kits and related products and services, including Lego board games, retail stores, video games, films, theme parks, and consultation services. Despite its expansion, the company remains privately held. Lego has had a significant impact on various areas of popular culture.

== Beginnings (1932–1959) ==
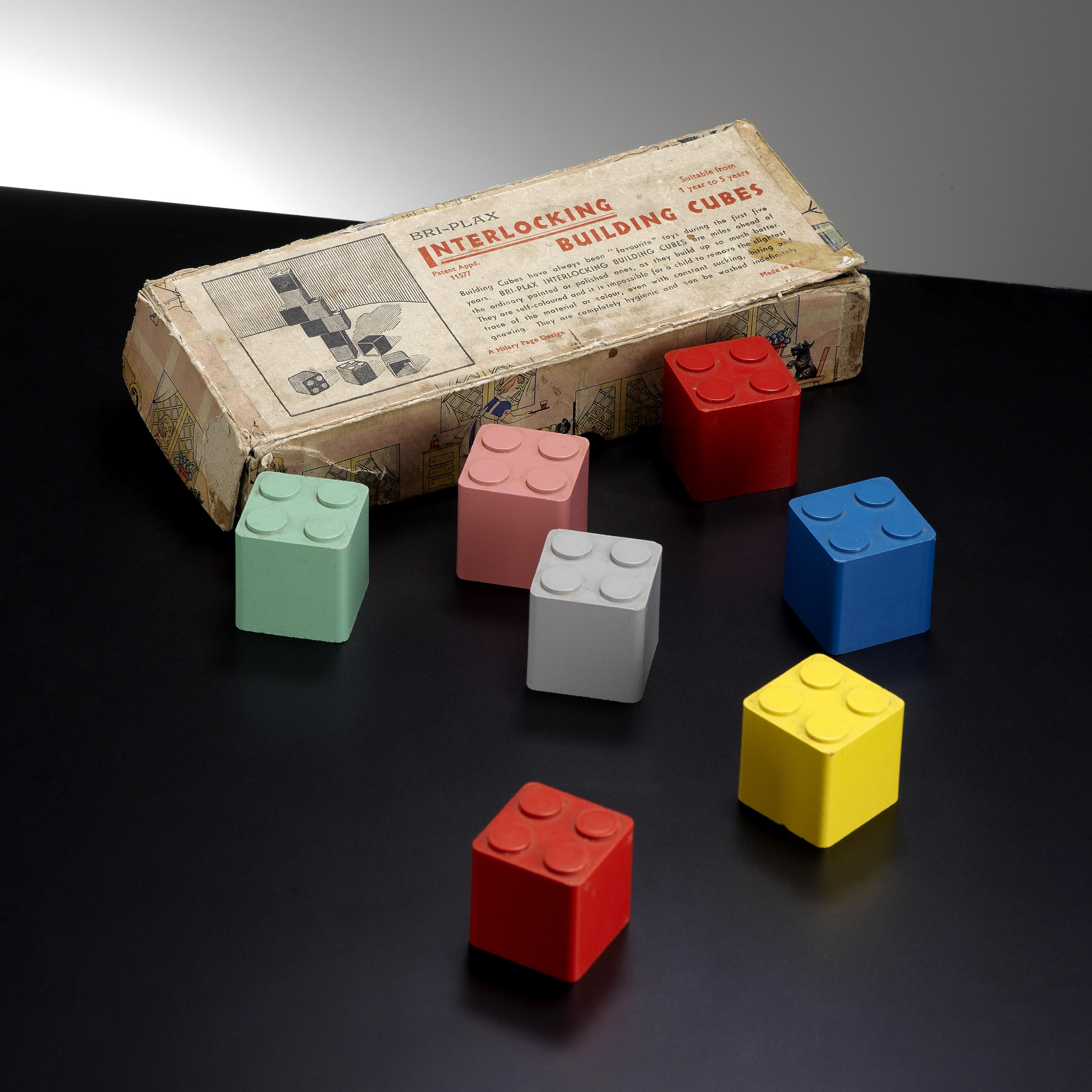
Hilary Fisher Page's Interlocking Building Cubes of 1939

The Lego Group was founded in the carpentry workshop of Ole Kirk Christiansen in Billund, Denmark. In 1916, Christiansen purchased Billund Maskinsnedkeri, a woodworking and carpentry shop in Billund, for 10,000 DKK. Initially, he and his staff primarily constructed houses and furniture. Following a fire that destroyed his workshop in 1924, Christiansen constructed a larger facility and worked towards expanding the business even further. However, the onset of the Great Depression brought fewer customers, forcing him to adapt. He started crafting miniature versions of his products as design aids, and it was these tiny stepladders and ironing boards that inspired him to make toys.

On August 10, 1932, Christiansen started making wooden toys such as piggy banks, pull toys, and miniature vehicles. Due to the challenging economy, the business often struggled, sometimes accepting food as payment from local farmers. Christiansen continued making furniture alongside the toys to stay solvent. A brief surge in sales during the mid-1930s yo-yo fad quickly subsided, but Christiansen repurposed leftover yo-yo parts as wheels for his toy trucks. Around this time, Christiansen's son, Godtfred, joined the company.

In 1934, Christiansen held a contest among his employees staff to name the company. He ended up winning the contect himself with the name "Lego", a contraction of the Danish phrase leg godt ("play well"). By coincidence, the word lego translates to "I put together" or "I assemble" in Latin.

Following World War II, plastics became available in Denmark, and Lego purchased a plastic injection molding machine in 1947. One of the first modular toys to be produced was a truck that could be taken apart and reassembled. In 1947, Ole Kirk and Godtfred obtained samples of interlocking plastic bricks produced by the company Kiddicraft. Hilary Fisher Page designed these "Kiddicraft Self-Locking Building Bricks." In 1939, Page applied for a patent on hollow plastic cubes with four studs on top (British Patent Nº.529,580) that allowed their positioning atop one another without lateral movement.

In 1944, Page applied "Improvement to Toy Building Blocks" as an addition to the previous patent, in which he describes a building system based on rectangular hollow blocks with 2X4 studs on top enabling the construction of walls with staggered rows and window openings. The addition was granted in 1947 as British Patent Nº 587,206. In 1949, the Lego Group began producing similar bricks, calling them "Automatic Binding Bricks." Lego bricks, then manufactured from cellulose acetate, were developed in the spirit of traditional wooden blocks that could be stacked upon one another but could be stuck together. They had several round studs on top and a hollow rectangular bottom. They would stick together, but loosely enough that they could be pulled apart. In 1953, the bricks were given a new name: Lego Mursten, or "Lego Bricks."

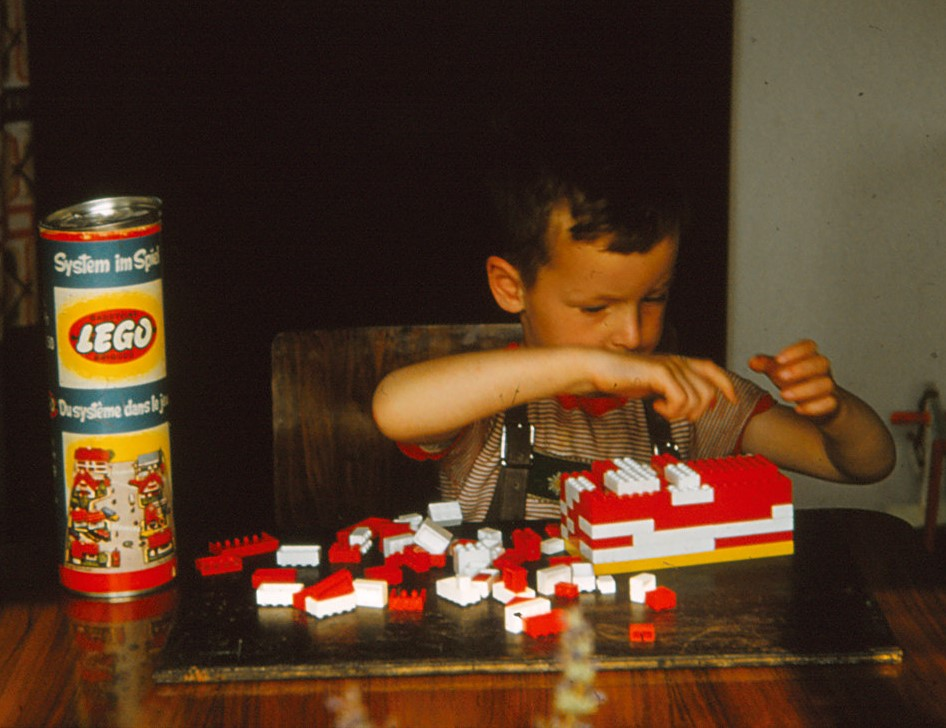
Lego imported from Switzerland to UK in 1957

In the 1950s, the LEGO Group made its first moves into foreign markets. The early focus was on the Nordic countries. Licensed production started in Norway in 1953 in partnership with Svein Strømberg, Oslo, under the corporate name Norske LEGIO A/S. In 1954, Godtfred Kirk Christiansen became the junior managing director of the Lego Group. His conversation with an overseas buyer struck the idea of a toy "system", with many toys in a line of related products. He evaluated their available products and saw the plastic bricks as the best candidate for such a system. In 1955, it was Sweden’s turn, and the same year, a partnership was organized in Iceland. Plastic products initially were not well received by customers, who preferred wooden or metal toys. Many of Lego's shipments were returned, following poor sales. In 1955, Lego released the "Town Plan" using plastic Lego building bricks as the system.

While initially moderately received, the original building bricks were unpopular as they did not stick together well enough, and lacked versatility. This changed in 1958 when hollow tubes were incorporated into the bricks' underside. This innovation provided robust base support, dramatically enhancing both the bricks' interlocking strength and their potential for diverse constructions. The company patented the new design, as well as several similar designs to avoid competition. 1958 also saw the death of Ole Kirk Christiansen, with Godtfred assuming leadership of the company.

== Change to plastic bricks (1960–1969) ==
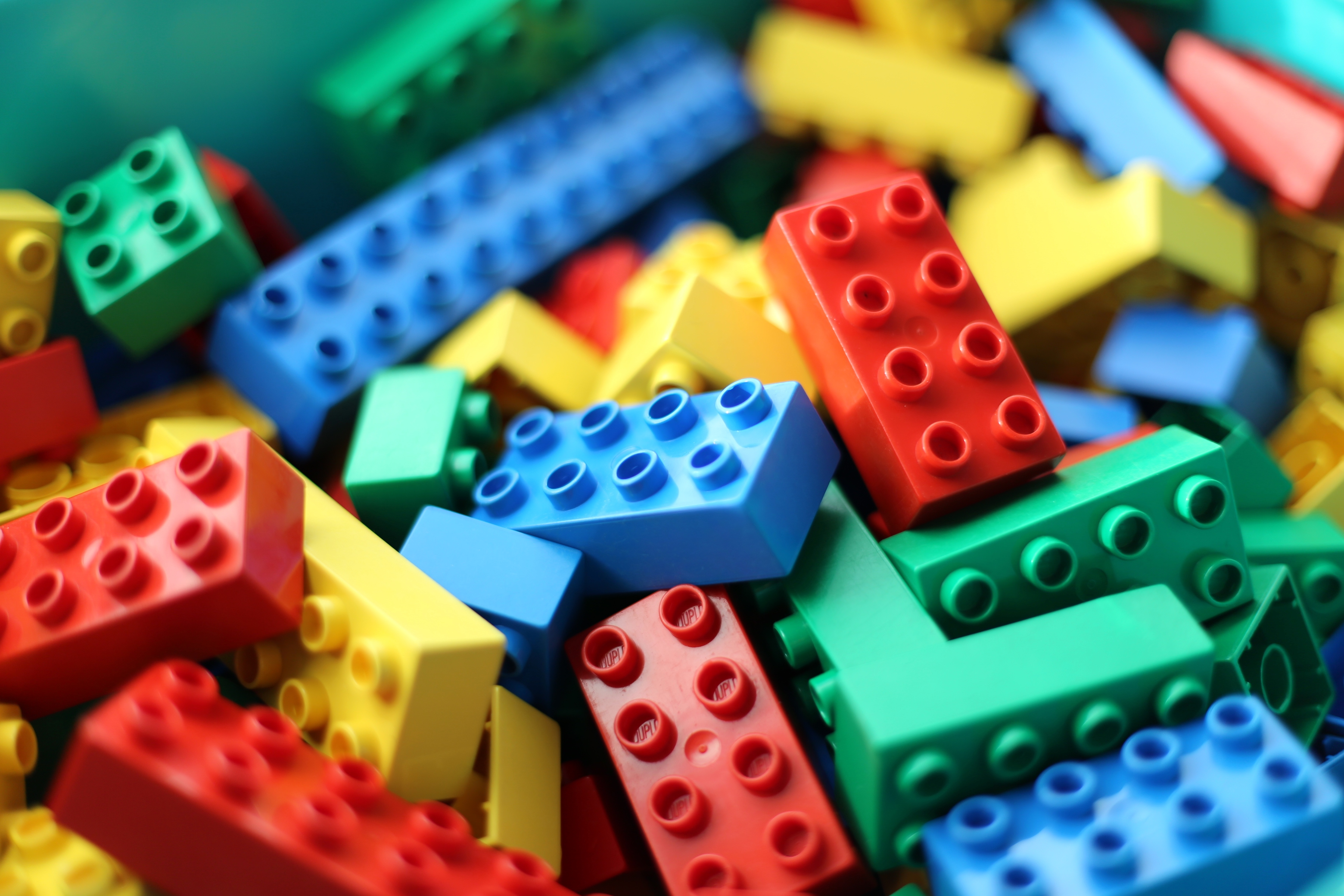
Lego Duplo bricks

In 1960, a warehouse fire destroyed most of Lego's wooden toy inventory, prompting Godtfred to cease wooden toy production entirely. Consequently, Godtfred's brothers, Gerhardt (then head of wooden toys) and Karl Georg, left Lego to found their own company, Bilofix. By the end of the year, the Lego Group had more than 500 employees.

In 1961, seeking to enter the North American market but lacking the logistical capabilities to do so, Lego made an arrangement allowing Samsonite to begin producing and selling their products in the United States and Canada. 1961 and 1962 saw the introduction of the first Lego wheels, an addition that expanded the potential for building cars, trucks, buses, and other vehicles from Lego bricks. Also, during this time, the Lego Group introduced toys targeted explicitly toward the pre-school market.

In 1963 cellulose acetate, the material used to create Lego bricks, was replaced by the more stable acrylonitrile butadiene styrene (ABS plastic), which is still in use today. ABS is non-toxic, less prone to discoloration and warping, and is more resistant to heat, acids, salt, and other chemicals. Samsonite manufacturing in North America did not switch at the same time, and still used some degree of cellulose acetate in its Lego products. 1964 was the first year that saw the inclusion of instruction manuals in Lego sets.

Lego set 102, a 4.5V motor set released in 1968.

A notable Lego Group series, the Lego train system, was released in 1966. The original train sets included a 4.5-volt (which was changed to a 12-volt version two years later) motor, battery box, and rails.

On 7 June 1968, the first Legoland Park was opened in Billund, featuring elaborate miniature towns built entirely from Lego bricks. The three-acre (12,000 m^{2}) theme park attracted 625,000 visitors in its first year alone. Over the next two decades, the theme park grew to more than eight times its original size and eventually attracted close to a million visitors annually. Sales of Lego sets also reached more than eighteen million units in 1968.

In 1969 the Duplo system was introduced. Duplo bricks are much larger than Lego bricks, making them safer for young children, but the two systems are compatible: Lego bricks can be fitted neatly onto Duplo bricks, allowing a seamless transition to the Lego system as children outgrow their Duplo bricks. The name Duplo comes from the Latin word duplus, which translates literally as double, meaning that a Duplo brick is exactly twice the dimension of a Lego building brick (2× height by 2× width by 2× depth = 8× the volume of a brick).

== Expansion (1970–1991) ==
During the last three decades of the 20th century, Lego expanded into new areas of toy making and marketing. In 1971, the company began targeting girls by introducing furniture and dollhouses under the Lego Homemaker theme. In 1972 Lego added boat and ship sets, with floating hull pieces, and Godtfred Kirk Christiansen's son, Kjeld Kirk Kristiansen, joined the managerial staff, after earning business degrees in Switzerland and Denmark. One of Kjeld's first achievements with the company was the foundation of manufacturing facilities, as well as a research and development department that would be responsible for keeping the company's manufacturing methods up to date.

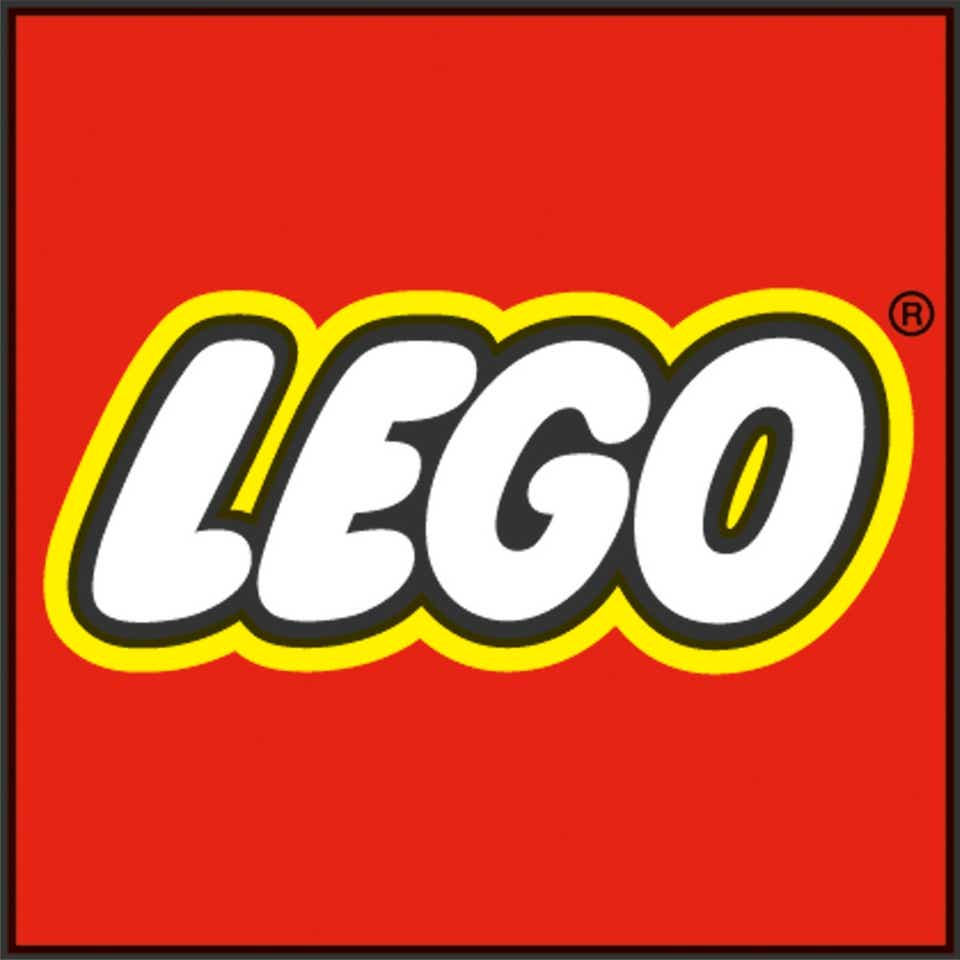
The LEGO logo as it appeared from 1973 to 1998

The Lego logo was redesigned in 1973, replacing various logos used previously to unify the brand. The company opened its first North American Lego production facility in Enfield, Connecticut, in the United States that same year.

In 1975 "Expert Series" sets were introduced, geared towards older, more experienced Lego builders followed by the "Expert Builder" sets in 1977. The technical sets featured moving parts such as gears, differentials, cogs, levers, axles, and universal joints and permitted the construction of realistic models such as automobiles, with functional rack and pinion steering and lifelike engine movements. In August 1978 the Lego "mini-figure" was added. The small Lego people had posable arms and legs, and initially a single head with a smiling face. The figure was used in many varieties of Lego sets, allowing the construction of towns populated with the smiling mini-figure Lego citizens. Lego also expanded into space with the creation of Lego Space sets with astronaut mini-figures, rockets, lunar rovers, and spaceships, and into the medieval territory with the Castle theme.

In 1979 Lego introduced the Scala series, featuring jewelry elements marketed towards young girls. Kjeld Kirk Kristiansen also became the president of Lego that year.

Since the 1960s, educators had seen Lego bricks' productive potential as being an invaluable asset in helping children to develop creativity and problem-solving abilities. Teachers had been using Lego bricks in the classroom for a variety of reasons. In 1980, the Lego Group established the Educational Products Department (eventually renamed Lego Dacta, in 1989), to expand the educational possibilities of their toys. A packing and assembly factory opened in Switzerland, followed by another in Jutland, Denmark, that manufactured Lego tyres.

Between the 1960s and 1990s, Lego worked with Royal Dutch Shell in allowing Shell branding on certain items.

In 1980 the second generation of Lego trains appeared. As before, these were available in either 4.5 V (battery-powered) or 12 V (mains powered; not available in North America), but with a much wider variety of accessories, including working lights, remote-controlled signals and decouplers.

The "Expert Builder" series matured in 1982, becoming the "Technic" series. 13 August of that year marked the Lego Group's 50th anniversary; the book 50 Years of Play was published to commemorate the occasion. In the following year, the Duplo system was expanded to include sets for even younger audiences, particularly infants; new sets included baby rattles and figures with movable limbs. The year after, Lego mini-figure citizens gained a realm of knights and horses, with a redesign of the Castle theme. Light & Sound sets made their appearance in 1985; these sets included a battery pack with electrical lights, buzzers, and other accessories to add another dimension of realism to Lego creations. Also, that year, the Lego Group's educational division produced the Technic Computer Control, which was an educational system whereby Technic robots, trucks, and other motorized models could be controlled with a computer. Manaus, Brazil gained a Lego factory in this year, as well.

In 1984 the Technic line was expanded with the addition of pneumatic components.

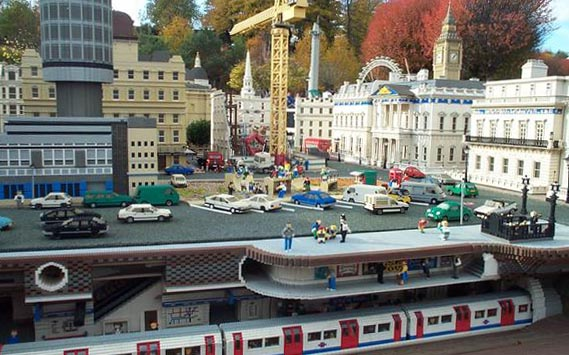
This Lego model of a composite of London, including a motorized model of a London Underground train controlled by computers, can be seen in Legoland Windsor.

In August 1988, 38 children from 17 countries took part in the first Lego World Cup building contest, held in Billund. That same year, Lego Canada was established. The Lego line grew again in 1989 with the release of the Lego Pirates theme, which featured various pirate ships, deserted islands, and treasure. The Lego Group's Educational Products Department was renamed Lego Dacta in this year; the name comes from the Greek word "didactic," which roughly means "the study of the learning process." MIT's Dr. Seymour Papert, from the Laboratory of Computer Learning, was named "Lego Professor of Learning Research," after his ongoing work in linking the Logo programming language with Lego products.

Until 1989, Lego mini-figures only came in yellow skin color with a standard smiling face, though early prototypes had a variety of skin colors and facial expressions. That year the Lego Group expanded the array of facial expressions (adding them around the standard face of two eyes and a smile), with beards and eye patches, sunglasses, lipstick, and eyelashes, mostly for the mini-figures in the newly launched Lego Pirates theme, and occasionally Lego Castle, Lego City, and Lego Space. Some older collectors resented the new facial expressions, saying they looked too "cartoon-ish" or "kiddy," and preferred the simplistic nature of the two eyes and smile. Particularly for Lego Pirates, these more complicated faces, in combination with the torso, headgear (either a helmet or hair), and accessories, allowed for the creation of specific characters and an accompanying backstory.

In 1990 Lego released a new series designed for advanced builders. Three Model Team sets, including a race car and an off-road vehicle, featured a level of detail and realism not previously seen in any Lego series. Where Technic was mechanically accurate, Model Team was visually and stylistically accurate. The Lego Group became one of the top 10 toy companies that year; it was the only toy company in Europe to be among the top 10. Also, that year, Lego land Billund reached more than one million visitors for the first time in its history. The first-ever "Lego Professor of Business Dynamics," Xavier Gilbert, was appointed to an endowed chair at the International Institute for Management Development in Lausanne, Switzerland. Lego Malaysia was also established in 1990. In 1991, the Lego Group standardized its electrical components and systems; the Trains and Technic motors were made 9V to bring the systems into line with the rest of the Lego range.

In 1992 two Guinness records were set using Lego products: A castle made from 400,000 Lego bricks, and measuring 4.45 meters by 5.22 meters, was built on Swedish television, and a 545 meters long Lego railway line with three locomotives was constructed. Duplo was augmented with the addition of the Toolo line featuring a screwdriver, wrench, nuts, and bolts; the Paradisa line, targeted towards girls, brought a variety of new pastel colors into the Lego system and focused on leisure resorts, horses and beach life. In 1993 a Duplo train and a parrot-shaped "brickvac" that could scoop Lego pieces up off the floor were released.

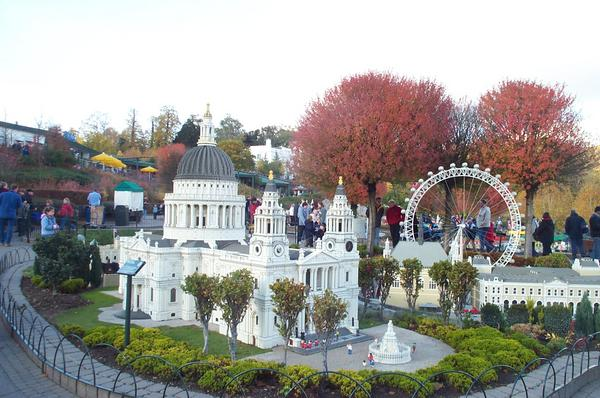
A model of St Paul's Cathedral in London can be seen in Lego land Windsor. It is made of thousands of Lego bricks. The rotating model of the London Eye in the background is also made of Lego bricks.

In the late 1990s the Lego Group brought out a series of new and specialized ranges aimed at particular demographics. The Slizers/Throwbots line preceded the Bionicle range and uses Technic pieces and specialist moldings to create a set of action figures for boys, while Belville is a more conventional line aimed at girls and featuring large posable figures like those in the Technic range. A "Lego 4 Juniors" group features 2-inch (51 mm) tall medium-sized figures ("medi-figure") without jointed arms, and longer legs than the classic Lego mini-figure. In 2003, the Lego Group introduced a completely new system, Clikits, aimed at girls and consisting of customizable plastic jewelry and accessories. In 2004, Lego added the QUATRO brick, for ages 1–3. Much like Duplo, a Quatro brick is four times the dimension of a regular Lego brick and is compatible with the Duplo brick. Also, that year, they created the second line of Knights Kingdom themed products.

== Decline (1992–2004) ==
Lego's profits had declined since 1992. Around 1995 or 1996, according to designer Mark Stafford, the Lego Group retired many LEGO Designers who had created the sets from the late 1970s to the mid-1990s, replacing them with 30 'innovators' who graduated from design colleges around Europe who knew "little specifically about toy design and less about LEGO building". At the time, sets could take over a year to progress from the design stage to store shelves. By 1997, there was a resultant change in the design direction of products, as set details were sacrificed for decreased building times (with fewer pieces) and increased playability features, but this shift drew mixed reception from long-term Lego fans who liked the meticulous construction required of classic-era sets of the 1980s to mid-1990s. Lego Pirates, which had a strong run since its launch in 1989, was promptly killed off, with 1997 being its last year of production.

On April 1, 1995, Lego's ruling Cristiansen/Kristiansen family would establish the Kirkbi investment firm, which has since led The Lego Group.

This change in design teams only served to accelerate the company's decline. In 1998, Lego posted its first-ever loss, at £23 million. In the same year, the company laid off 1,000 employees.

In 1999 the first Lego products featuring licensed intellectual property, i.e., not designed in-house, were Lego Star Wars and Winnie the Pooh Duplo, followed in 2000 by Lego Harry Potter characters to figures from Steven Spielberg movies. Soren Holm, the head of Lego Concept Lab, said toy weapons had always been heavily debated, but since the release of Lego Star Wars, they had grown "more comfortable with conflict". Mr. Laursen, executive North American operations suggested to make "violence not explicit, but humoristic." Licensed properties did provide a short-term boost to profits during the release of blockbuster movies; however, sales would taper off after public excitement died down. Furthermore, the added cost of the license resulted in such sets being more expensive which alienated long-time fans, who also disliked the declining quality and reduced availability of comparable sets not based on licensing.

In 2002, Duplo was merged with Lego Baby into the new label Lego Explore.

In 2004, Lego posted a loss of £174 million, with the executive vice-president of marketing, Mads Nipper later describing the company as having been "almost bankrupt" at this point. He analyzed in retrospect that "we continued to invest as if the company were growing strongly. We failed to realize that we were on a slippery path… Children were getting less and less time to play. Some of the western markets had fewer and fewer children. So play trends changed, and we failed to change. We were not making toys that were sufficiently interesting to children. We failed to innovate enough. And we had nowhere cut deep enough to right-size the company".

In 2004 Kjeld Kirk Kristiansen resigned as CEO and appointed Jørgen Vig Knudstorp, the first non-family CEO. The company sold the four Legoland parks to theme-park operators Merlin Entertainments, and manufacturing, 80% of which had been outsourced, was returned to Lego's control.

== Recovery (2005–present) ==
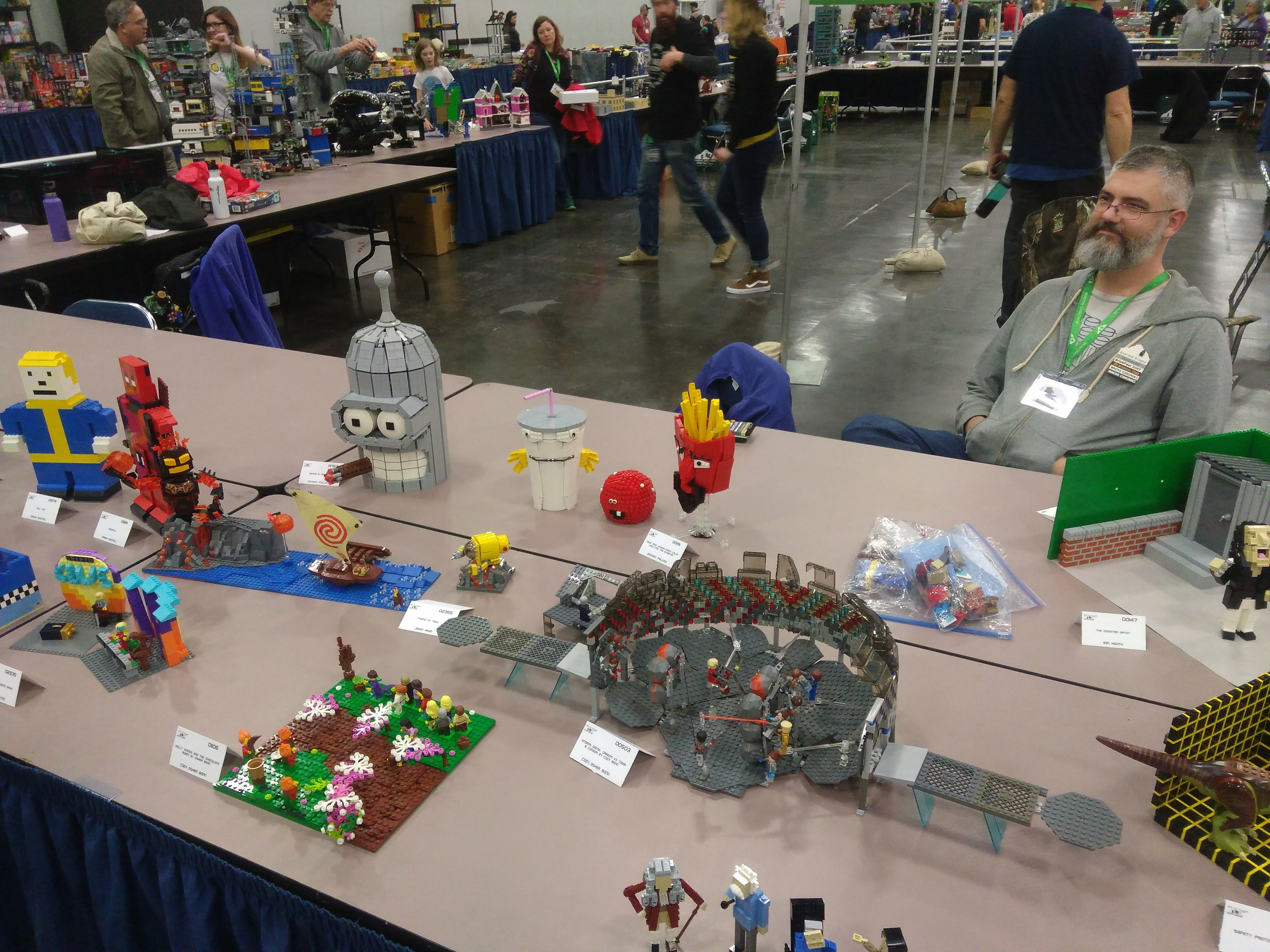
A presenter at Bricks Cascade, a Lego convention in Portland, Oregon, in March 2018

The company focused on its core products and reintroduced the Duplo label in late 2004. Since 2004, manufacturing had been moved to Mexico, and distribution relocated from Billund to the Czech Republic. On June 20, 2006, Lego announced it closed the U.S. manufacturing plant in Enfield, Connecticut, and fired approximately 300 employees.

By 2007 a global workforce of 9,100 in 1998 was reduced to 4,200 due to outsourcing. In the US alone, Lego sales increased 32 percent because of Star Wars and Indiana Jones-themed games, while globally 2008 sales increased 18%. Mr. Laursen, Lego executive of North American operations, said in 2009 that licenses played a more prominent role in the American market than overseas. About 60 percent of Lego's American sales were estimated to be linked to licenses, twice that of 2004. Laursen stated in 2009 that Lego was "definitely more commercially oriented". In 2009, both Lego Games (board games) and Lego Power Miners were introduced, along with the concept for Lego Ninjago. Despite the Great Recession, profits for 2009 were £99.5 million, with Mads Nipper, Lego executive vice-president of marketing, stating to be "delivering twice the return on sales of any competitor."

In 2011 Lego launched a new in-house theme called Lego Ninjago, which became a popular theme worldwide, still ongoing as of 2026. Lego also resumed a long-term contract with Royal Dutch Shell, after using its logo on products from the 1960s through to the 1990s. Greenpeace criticised this co-branding in 2014. After the Greenpeace campaign, Lego decided not to renew the contract, with the Shell logo only appearing in co-licensed sets with Ferrari or BMW.

In 2012 an animated short film titled The Lego Story made by Danish studio Lani Pixels for the 80th anniversary of Lego, depicted the struggles of Ole Kirk Christiansen and his son Godtfred Kirk Christiansen from 1932 to 1968, as they worked to make the company successful.

In 2013, the LEGO Group announced its decision to build a factory in China under its strategy of locating production close to its core markets. Asia is regarded as a future core market for the LEGO Group, partly in the light of rising LEGO Group sales in the region. Then Chief Operating Officer, Bali Padda, explains the background to the decision to build a factory in Jiaxing.

In 2014 Warner Bros and The Lego Group released The Lego Movie, a computer-animated adventure comedy film telling the story of an ordinary Lego Mini-figure construction worker named Emmet Brickowski prophesied to save the world. It received one of the highest recorded openings for an original animated movie, and the Los Angeles Times noted "nearly unanimous positive reviews" for the film.

In 2015 the Lego firm sparked controversy when it refused a bulk order to Chinese artist Ai Weiwei, who is openly critical of the Chinese communist government. Ai had previously used Lego bricks to build portraits of the world's political activists. Lego said it would not sell directly to users with "political intentions". An opinion piece in the Communist Party mouthpiece Global Times praised Lego for its "good business sense" while the decision drew condemnation online. Lego fans offered to donate Lego bricks to Ai Weiwei instead.

In 2017 Warner Bros, DC Entertainment, and The Lego Group released The Lego Batman Movie as a spin-off based on one of the lead characters of Lego's first animated movie. Lego has since released another animated film based on one of its toy lines, Ninjago, entitled The Lego Ninjago Movie in 2017.

In the first half of 2017, Lego saw its first revenue decline in 13 years, announcing plans in September 2017 to cut 1,400 jobs.

On February 7th 2019 a sequel to The Lego Movie was produced by Warner Animation Group and released by Warner Bros, titled The Lego Movie 2: The Second Part. Many of the voice actors from the first film reprised their characters for the sequel, but it under-performed in ticket sales compared to its predecessors.

On 25 November 2019, the Lego Group announced the acquisition of BrickLink, the world's largest Lego fan community, from Nexon for an unknown price, which was expected to be finished before the end of 2019.

Following The Lego Movie 2: The Second Part's disappointing box office returns, Warner Bros. allowed their film rights with Lego to expire by fall 2019. On December 19, 2019, Universal Pictures entered early negotiations with Lego for a new first-look deal. Dan Lin, who produced the previous Lego films for Warner Bros., is expected to remain as a producer through his company Rideback. On April 23, 2020, the deal with Universal was set for a five-year film deal, with plans to include its own franchises and characters in its run of Lego films. While Universal will develop and distribute future Lego films, Warner Bros. retains the rights to the original The Lego Movie characters and properties.

In November 2020 Lego announced its largest set to date: a replica of the Colosseum in Rome containing 9,036 pieces. The set overtakes the previous record holder, the Millennium Falcon from the Star Wars franchise. In 2021 this record was topped by the Titanic model at 9,090 pieces. In 2022 the second set to reach 10,000 bricks was released, a replica of the Eiffel Tower with 10,001 pieces. The first was the Lego World map.

In 2023, The LEGO Group announced it will be moving its U.S. headquarters from Enfield, Connecticut to Boston, Massachusetts. While Enfield has been the regional home for more than 50 years, LEGO has picked Boston for its future head office in the Americas. The company said it will move its current office from Enfield to Boston by the end of 2026, with the move beginning in mid-2025.
