= Lego Hero Factory =

Line of construction toys by LEGO

Hero Factory
- Sub‑themes: Hero Recon Team
- Availability: 2010–2014
- Total sets: 70
- Characters: (See Characters)

Lego Hero Factory is a discontinued line of construction toys created by the Lego Group marketed primarily at 6-to-16-year-olds. The theme was launched in 2010 as a successor to the former Lego construction theme Bionicle, which ended its run earlier that year. In its legacy, Hero Factory utilized the building system used in Bionicle before going on to create its own. The theme was discontinued after 2014 in favor of reviving Bionicle.

The story revolves around the Alpha 1 Team, a high-ranking group of robotic Heroes who work for the Hero Factory, a peacekeeping organization whose objective is to fight crime across the galaxy and protect its similarly robotic populace. The Hero Factory itself is a towering skyscraper based in the fictional Makuhero City that is located on a terraformed asteroid. New Heroes are constructed everyday and trained from the ground up. Each Hero is unique thanks to their Quaza Core, a mineral stone that provides each of them with a distinct personality.

== Characters ==
=== Heroes ===
- Preston Stormer: The no-nonsense Alpha 1 Team leader, plagued by his failure in a past mission, and demanding in his expectations of all team members.
- William Furno: Once a reckless and ambitious rookie Hero assigned to Alpha 1, now a valuable team member.
- Dunkan Bulk: A physically imposing, powerful senior Alpha 1 member, whose impressive strength belies a growing intelligence.
- Jimi Stringer: A philosophical, laid-back, and musically inclined veteran of the team, who incorporates sound-based functions into his weaponry.
- Mark Surge: An emotional and temperamental hot-headed former rookie working to overcome a secret insecurity.
- Natalie Breez: The sole female member of Alpha 1, brash in her dealings with her teammates, but with a connection to nature.
- Nathan Evo: An introspective rookie Hero working with the team, who emphasizes heavy artillery use in his missions.
- Julius Nex: Socially nuanced and technologically gifted head of Hero Outreach and a rookie on Alpha 1, with a love for gadgetry and herobook.
- Daniel Rocka: Headstrong new rookie of the team, also covertly a member of the Hero Recon Team.

=== Villains ===
==== Von Nebula's Gang ====
- Von Nebula: Formerly Von Ness, a Hero gone rogue on a mission to destroy Hero Factory and revenge on Stormer.
- Meltdown: A psychopathic scientist, skilled in the use of chemicals. his venomous whip is created to corrupt victims turning them wild and insane
- XPlode: An exceedingly rich criminal-for-hire, who works jobs based on the danger level. He is equipped with heat seeking spine torpedoes.
- Corroder: Conniving henchbot who seeks to challenge the status quo, capable of spraying acid.
- Thunder: A strong, but dimwitted criminal who bears a massive crushing claw.
- Rotor: Notorious criminal, a twisted lackey of Von Nebula, equipped with a large propeller on his back for flight and combat.
- Vapour: One of Von Nebula's recruits, with a penchant for using gaseous based weaponry.

==== Fire Villains ====
- Fire Lord: A mining bot who went insane, and began a megalomaniacal plot to steal all sources of Hero fuel.
- Jetbug: Insane henchbot of Fire Lord's, noted for his constant giggling.
- Drilldozer: A huge but dimwitted strong member of Fire Lord's group.
- Nitroblast: A smart and devoted member in the Fire Lord's gang.

==== Jungle Villains ====
- Witch Doctor: Once a Hero Factory instructor obsessed with Quaza, transformed into an evil tyrant who took control of the wildlife of the planet Quatros for his own evil schemes and attempted to destroy it.
- Scorpio: One of the Witch's powerful servants with a built in stinger and blaster on his tail.
- Waspix: She has an advanced speed and flight, making it difficult to be caught.
- Raw-Jaw: A Gorilla Elephant hybrid that Witch use's for labor to mine for Quaza.
- Fangz: Guard Dogs to Witch, Making sure they're master succeed to his plan.

==== Legion of Darkness ====
- Black Phantom: A powerful villain who planned to destroy the Hero Factory's Assembly Tower and planned the Factory Breakout.
- Voltix: A cunning, electricity wielding villain who initiated the Hero Factory villain breakout.
- Speeda Demon: An insane villain equipped with a nitro-rocket bike.
- Toxic Reapa: Criminal from the jungle planet Z'chaya.
- Jawblade: An aquatic shark villain hailing from the planet Scylla.
- Splitface: A criminal with a split personality.
- Thornraxx: An aggressive insectoid from a hive planet.
- XT4: A crazed worker bot from the planet Mechna.
- Core Hunter: A cruel villain and former Hero who hunts Heroes for their cores. Once friend of Preston Stormer.

==== Brains ====
- Dark Creator: The original "Mastermind" behind the Brains attacking the city, His physical appearance is unknown and is possibly working for Von Nebula.
- Brains: Organic creatures with an imperative to destroy the Hero Factory, capable of possessing other creatures.
- Pyrox: Once a small bull creature, turned fiery minotaur controlled by a Brain.
- Ogrum: A plant ogre under the control of the Brains.
- Bruizer: A rock monster possessed by a Brain.
- Scarox: Formerly a Dune Crawler, transformed into venomous creature under the direction of the Brains.
- Aquagon: An aquatic creature transformed into a hostile invader by a Brain.
- Frost Beast: Snow creature transformed by the Brains into an icy villain.
- Dragon Bolt: An electric dragon, controlled by a Brain.

==== Beasts ====
- Queen Beast: The ruler of The all Beasts, who defends her nest inside a giant cave deep underneath Antropolis.
- Jumpers: Insect-like creatures that live under the city of Antropolis.
- Jaw Beast: One of the Beasts from under Antropolis that has a big jaw and menacing pincers.
- Flyer Beast: One of the Beasts that can fly and uses a tower and a claw as weapons.
- Splitter Beast: A Beast that can split in two. It carries a lamp post as a weapon and uses its plasma claws to attack.
- Tunneler Beast: A Beast who can tunnel its way through the ground with its acid talon.
- Crystal Beast: One of the Beasts that stands guard inside the Jumper's crystal cave.

==== Others ====
- Nathaniel Zib: Chief officer to Hero Factory who helps our heroes in case of damage or upgrading they're armor and weapons.
- Quadal: Zibs trusted assistant drone who has four tentacle like arms.
- Akiyama Makuro: Founder of Hero Factory who believes in a bright future for Makuhero city.
- Daniella Capricorn: Female reporter to Makuhero City News who is constantly filming heroes due to it excitement, She can get a little rough from her annoying camera bot.

== Adaptations ==
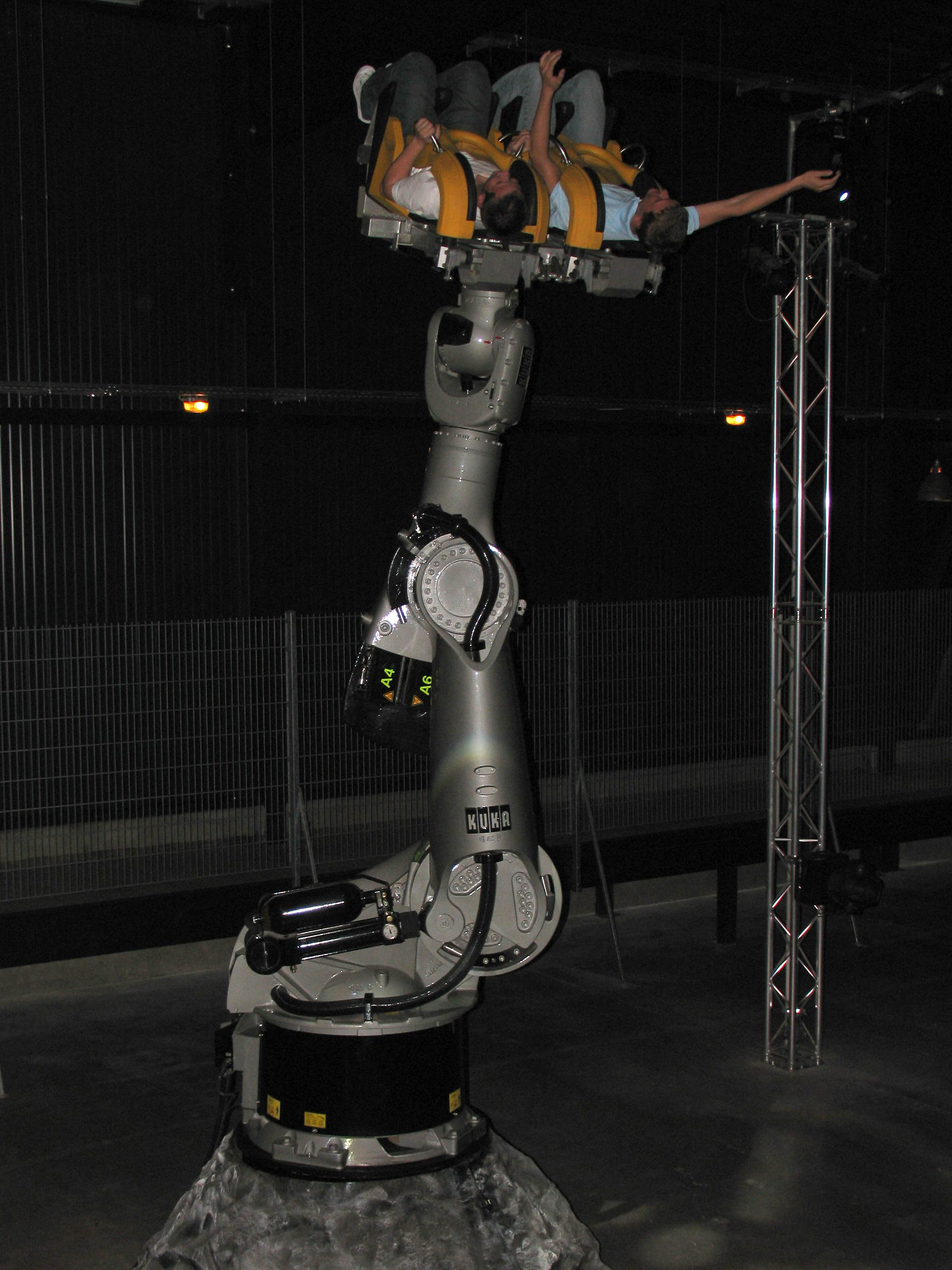
Hero Factory attraction at Legoland Deutschland

=== Comics and books ===
In July 2010 Lego Group and DC Comics released the first Lego Hero Factory comic on the Hero Factory website only. Entitled The Trials of Furno, it was released for free download at Lego.com, and follows the story of the rookie hero William Furno on his first mission, to battle against Xplode and Rotor. A second issue, entitled Core Crisis was released in September 2010. In 2012, a new series of books tied in with the Hero Factory story and toyline began being released, written by Bionicle writer Greg Farshtey. So far, one DK Reader-level 3 book has been released and four chapter books were released in September (The Doom Box) and October (Legion of Darkness) 2012, then in January (Collision Course), March (Robot Rampage), and April (Mirror World) 2013. They are published by Scholastic.

=== Television series ===
To accompany the Hero Factory sets and storyline, a TV series of the same name, produced by Threshold Animation Studios, was commissioned by Lego in 2010. Starting off as a four-part mini-series on September 20, 2010 on Nicktoons, further episodes followed portraying subsequent storylines from the toy line. Threshold have produced ten Hero Factory episodes, while an eleventh and final episode was produced instead by Lego partners Advance and Ghost for the "Invasion From Below" story arc, premiering in January 2014.

The first four episodes of the series were released as a direct-to-DVD film entitled Hero Factory: Rise of the Rookies on November 22, 2010, it was released in Region 2 on October 21, 2011. The second assortment of episodes, including "Ordeal of Fire and "Savage Planet" (Parts One and Two), were also released as a direct-to-DVD film on October 4, 2011 entitled Hero Factory: Savage Planet and received a Region 2 release on November 5, 2012. Latter episodes are as of yet to receive a DVD release.

=== Legoland attraction ===
At Legoland Deutschland the Hero Factory is an attraction in the Hero Factory theme.

== Reception ==
Toybuzz stated that the simplicity of the Hero sets were great for people who like the actual playing experience, but not so good for Lego fans who prefer the enjoyment of the build. Toybuzz praised the sturdyness of the figures and wrote that "the best feature was that the weapons were actually one of their arms", as you do not have to spend time on putting the weapon back on. Toybuzz also praised the packaging that the Hero sets came with, stating that the plastic tubes are great for organization and for keeping the sets tidy.
