= Violence and Lego =

Toy controversy

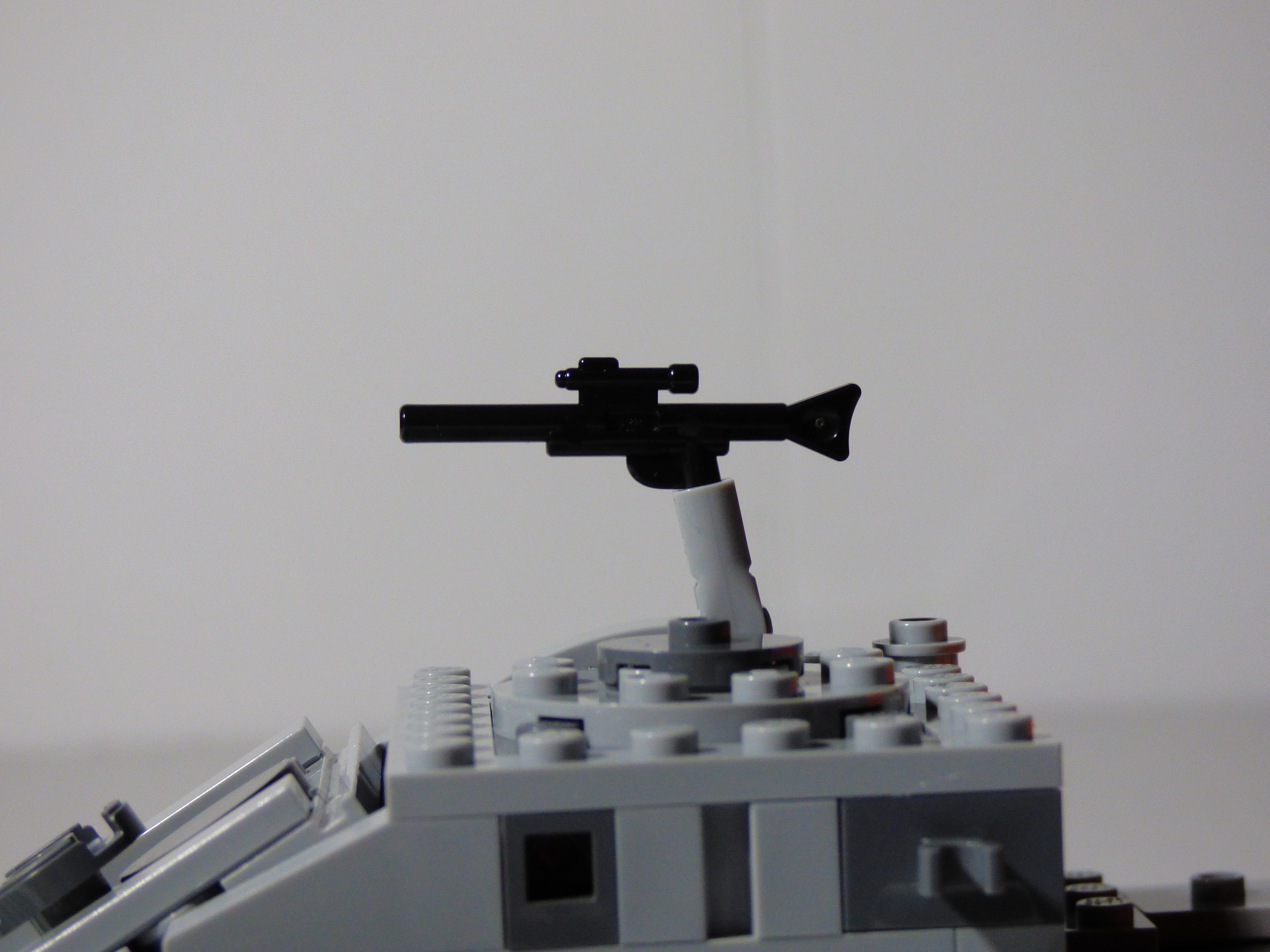
A Lego gun from a 2016 Star Wars set

Lego toys did not feature weapons or violence from their inception in 1949 until 1978. Subsequently, The Lego Group, the company that manufactures Legos, has stated that they maintain a goal of not producing products that promote violence in realistic daily-life scenarios, but allow for fantasy or imaginary violence. Academic research has shown that violence and weaponry has increased in Lego sets since the introduction of weapons in 1978, potentially to compete with the popularity of action-figure toys and video games.

== Weaponry in Lego ==
The presence of Lego guns in the history of the company can be traced back to the immediate post-war years following World War II. Lego was still making wooden toys until 1947, when the company purchased a plastic injection moulding machine. From 1945 onwards, Lego began producing a wooden version of a toy pistol. The company then applied for a patent of the model in 1946. A plastic version of a rapid-firing pistol began to be manufactured in 1949.

When Lego was first introduced in the United States through a deal with Samsonite in 1962, the company's advertising rejected military themes, due to the increasing anxiety in the population over the Vietnam War. Lego products did not include dull green colours, unless used in trees and green base plates, in order to make it more difficult for children to build military vehicles. Lego advertising focused instead on creativity and free-thinking. A promotional Lego System Assortment 1968 UK catalogue stated, "A good toy is one which gives free reign [sic] to a child's natural creativity and does what he wants it to do."

In 1978, Lego weapons were introduced into the Lego Castle theme, which included a sword, a halberd and a lance. Other Lego themes were released in later years which included weapon elements. In 1989, the Lego Pirates theme introduced handguns and cannons, and this trend continued with Bionicle sets in 2005 and 2006.

The increased presence of weaponry in Lego sets can be partly attributed to the popularity of movie-themed sets, such as Lego Star Wars. The Star Wars films featured numerous weapons and parents raised concerns about its level of violence. When Lego won the Star Wars franchise and began to produce Lego Star Wars sets in 1999, parents complained that the company was abandoning its pacifist ideals. However, the lightsabers and blasters produced in the sets were all fantasy weapons and clearly distinct from real weapons.

The Lego Group has maintained its long-standing policy of avoiding the manufacture of realistic modern weaponry. In a 2010 Lego report, the company stated, "The basic aim is to avoid realistic weapons and military equipment that children may recognize from hot spots around the world and to refrain from showing violent or frightening situations when communicating about LEGO products. At the same time, the purpose is for the LEGO brand not to be associated with issues that glorify conflicts and unethical or harmful behavior".

== Academic research ==
In May 2016, researchers at the University of Canterbury published a report in the scientific journal PLOS One, which concluded that Lego had become "significantly more violent" after the research found that the violence of products highlighted in Lego catalogues had increased by 19 per cent every year from 1978 to 2014. The research also stated that almost 30 per cent of Lego sets included at least one weapon brick. The researchers used the Bricklink website, which catalogues every part used in every Lego set since 1949 and also examined 1,500 images from Lego catalogues since 1979. On balance, the report also noted, "It is unlikely that the LEGO company is the only toy manufacturer whose products have become increasingly violent; for instance, Oppel has already provided initial evidence that Playmobil has followed a similar trajectory... The question remains, though, why violence has increased so much in general." The research did not assess whether the increase had any influence on violent behaviour in children.

Gary Cross, a professor of history at Pennsylvania State University remarked that Lego's expansion of weaponry in its products was the result of direct competition following a surge in the popularity of action-figure toys in the 1980s and also from video game companies, such as Nintendo and Sega. Lego's toy weapons may have simply been a symptom of the general rise of violence in pop-culture.

After the publication of the University of Canterbury study, The Lego Group stated that it makes a clear distinction between conflict and violence. Amanda Santorum, a brand manager at The Lego Group said, "we do not make products that promote or encourage violence. Weapon-like elements in a Lego set are part of a fantasy/imaginary setting, and not a realistic daily-life scenario."

== Custom-built weapons ==
Various custom builders of Lego, entrepreneurs and small companies have attempted to fill the gaps in the company's inventory of Lego weapons, often ignoring the company's ethos regarding Lego guns and modern military equipment. A British teenager named Jack Streat built a series of working Lego guns, including a replica Lee–Enfield bolt-action rifle. He also produced a book titled, LEGO Heavy Weapons. An adult fan of Lego (AFOL) named Will Chapman designed and cast his own non-functional toy guns using constructed aluminium moulds from a CNC mill and injection-molded plastic from melted-down Lego bricks.

== See also ==
- Lego timeline
