= Lego RoboRiders =

Lego series launched and produced in 2000

- Subject: Robots
- Availability: 2000–2001

Lego RoboRiders is a discontinued Lego theme launched in 2000, following the Throwbots/Slizers, and preceding Bionicle.

A total of eleven sets were released, seven official sets and four promotional sets were released as part of the theme. Sponsored drinks cans, when exposed to cold temperatures, would reveal codes used to play an online game. RoboRiders is the last line of action toys created in the Lego Technic line before Bionicle.

== Types ==
=== Power RoboRider ===
The Power Lego toy figure resembles a yellow motorcycle. The features present on it include a crane, two plasma cannons that fire two small red LEGO pieces, and a wheel launcher. Both the toy and its corresponding realm are themed off of toxic waste, Power's realm resembling a post-apocalyptic city.

=== Frost RoboRider ===
Frost's Lego toy figure resembles a white and grey motorcycle. It also features a wheel launcher and ice launchers that fire poles made out of translucent blue plastic. The toy is themed after ice. Frost's realm is depicted as an arctic tundra with ice-themed obstacles and creatures.

=== Lava RoboRider ===
Lava's Lego toy figure is a red motorcycle. Both the figure and its corresponding realm are themed after volcanoes and magma. The toy's features include a wheel launcher and a spinning mechanism with two small axes on it.

=== Swamp RoboRider ===
Swamp's Lego toy figure is a teal and green motorcycle. Both Swamp's toy and realm are themed after swamps, hence the name. The toy's features are two katanas and a wheel launcher.

=== Onyx RoboRider ===
Onyx's Lego toy figure is a black motorcycle. Both the toy and its realm are themed after rocks. The features on the toy are a wheel launcher and laser cannons, which shoot red translucent poles.

=== Dust RoboRider ===
Dust, which is another Lego toy figure, searches for the enemies in the much-dreaded Desert-Realm within the theme of the product line. There are howling sandstorms that are very difficult to navigate through, the terrain is very tough to drive in, and there is always a danger of drowning in quicksand or monster sandstorms. Dust's main enemies are the sand pits. Dust is armed with two spears, and is also armed with a wheel launcher. His colors are tan and grey.

=== Boss RoboRider ===
The Boss RoboRider Lego toy figure is depicted as an orange motorcycle. The toy's place in the fictional storyline is unknown. It was the final release for the RoboRiders toyline.

== Wheels ==
Two unique wheels were released on each set, a different color each time, Lego said these wheels had special powers, however no information was ever released on what powers these wheels had, only names: Axer, Blazooka, Chain-Saw, Driller, Dynamite, Flame, Fuel, Grab, Laser, Ninja, Rope, Scout, Skeleton, Stunner, Toxic and Twin-Saw.

== Promotional sets ==
Four promotional sets were given out by the Kabaya Candy Corp based on four of the RoboRiders. They were never mentioned in the storyline.

- Swamp Craft (Swamp)
- Ice Explorer (Frost)
- Volcano Climber (Lava)
- Dirt Bike (Power)
