= Lego FORMA =

Lego theme

- Subject: Fish model
- Licensed from: Indiegogo
- Availability: January 2019–December 2019
- Total sets: 4
- Official website

Lego FORMA is a discontinued Lego theme, and the first crowdfunded Lego theme. The theme's builds were inspired by fish, consisting of a base "Koi" set and several separate "skin" sets to customize the build. It was licensed and crowdfunded via Indiegogo, and managed by the LEGO Group. FORMA was considered to be a development upon the ideas of the 2011 Lego Muji theme, which combined paper and LEGO bricks. The theme was introduced on 1 January 2019 and was discontinued by the end of December the same year.

== Overview ==
The Lego FORMA product line focused on the combination of Technic parts and foil skins to create models of fish. The theme consisted of different foil skins which could be added to the base "Koi" set to create a Shark, along with two other colors of Koi.

== Development ==
Lego FORMA was initially a project created by Lego's Creative Play Lab. This subset of the LEGO Group initially kept its development behind closed doors, but FORMA was a departure from this in order to gain sufficient customer feedback and weigh interest in the product. Indiegogo was chosen for the crowdfunding and launch of the product, as the feedback LEGO was looking for could be gathered easily on the platform.

Lego FORMA was an updated version of the previous Lego Muji theme, which was released in 2011 and combined paper and LEGO parts. Lego FORMA included some of the concepts of the Lego Muji theme, but also introduced Technic parts and the concept of add-on sets to create different types of models.

During the development process of the Lego FORMA theme, Creative PlayLab's Vice President Tom Donaldson explained, "This was the fastest product ever to get to market from the Lego Group. It started with a serendipitous connection between an individual designer and a marketeer. We give our designers 10% of their time to use as they see fit, and this designer was playing with kinetic sculptures and organic forms. The marketeer was looking at how to evolve one of our product lines and the connection was set. The process was very iterative–every two weeks exploring new designs, new market opportunities and testing with consumers wherever possible."

== Construction sets ==
According to BrickLink, The Lego Group released a total of 4 Lego sets as part of Lego FORMA theme. The product line was eventually discontinued by the end of 2019.

Lego FORMA was released on 1 January 2019 in North America and United Kingdom. The Lego Group had a partnership with Indiegogo for the initial distribution of the sets through crowdfunding. As part of the campaign, the Lego Group released four Lego FORMA sets. The four sets were the base set, Koi (set number: 81000), Shark Skin (set number: 81001), Splash Koi Skin (set number: 81002) and Ink Koi Skin (set number: 81003). The base Koi set sold for $46 on Indiegogo with a planned price of $66 upon its release on Lego's website, and the "skin" add-on sets sold for $15 each.

=== Koi ===
Koi (set number: 81000) was released on 11 January 2019. The appearance of the set was based on that of a Koi. The set consists of 293 pieces and foil skins. The koi model measures 27.9 cm high and 12.7 cm wide. The fish body is built using Lego Technic, before the foil skin is added. A crank at the base of the model allows the fish to simulate lifelike movements. The foil skins from the other sets can be added to the model's Technic frame to change its appearance. Each of the foil skins used holes to connect to the frame and prevent the material from being damaged when builders change the skin. The designer explained, "We designed the hole as a triangle, so the material can easily stretch when the connector element is attached. Also, the triangle is just the right size, so the connector element stays centered."

=== Shark Skin ===
Shark Skin (set number: 81001) was released on 11 January 2019. The appearance of this add-on was based on that of a Shark. The set consisted of 31 pieces and foil skins. Shark Skin can replace the foil skins of Koi (set number: 81000) to turn it into a blue shark model. The instructions and pattern for the Shark Skin were made available online to encourage a do-it-yourself style for the theme.

=== Splash Koi Skin ===
Splash Koi Skin (set number: 81002) was released on 11 January 2019. The set's appearance, much like the base set, was based on Koi. The set consisted of 33 pieces and foil skins. Splash Koi Skin replaces the foil skins of Koi (set number: 81000) to turn it into a multi colored Koi model. The designer explained, "For the LEGO FORMA Splash Koi Skin, we played around with different effects and painting styles and were highly inspired by water colours. Being the most colourful of the three koi skins, the Splash Koi also proved to be the most challenging one. Our vision for its colour vibrancy and details not only had to work on screen, but also on print, to ensure it would live up to our high quality standards. It took us some rounds of iteration to get it right, but feel very happy with the end result."

=== Ink Koi Skin ===
Ink Koi Skin (set number: 81003) was released on 11 January 2019 and was based on Koi as well. The set consisted of 33 pieces and foil skins. Ink Koi Skin replaces the foil skins of the base Koi to turn it into a black and white Koi model. The foil skins allowed the builders to color the skins themselves. The designer explained this idea “drew on inspiration from adult colouring books and ink art.” The instructions were available on Lego's website along with printable files for the skins.

== Reception ==
In 2018, Creative PlayLab's Vice President Tom Donaldson had revealed that Lego FORMA was the fastest product ever to make it to market for the company. In total, the crowdfunding raised $1.4 million, 1,334% of the goal. Despite this financial success, FORMA would be discontinued in December 2019, with leftover stock being sold on Lego's website in the UK and becoming available as a Lego VIP reward in the United States, purchasable with VIP points. The theme was well-received, with Lego using feedback to apply the concepts of the theme to its other products.

== See also ==
- Lego Technic
- Lego Art
- Lego Avatar
