= Lego pneumatics =

Variety of Lego bricks

Lego Pneumatics
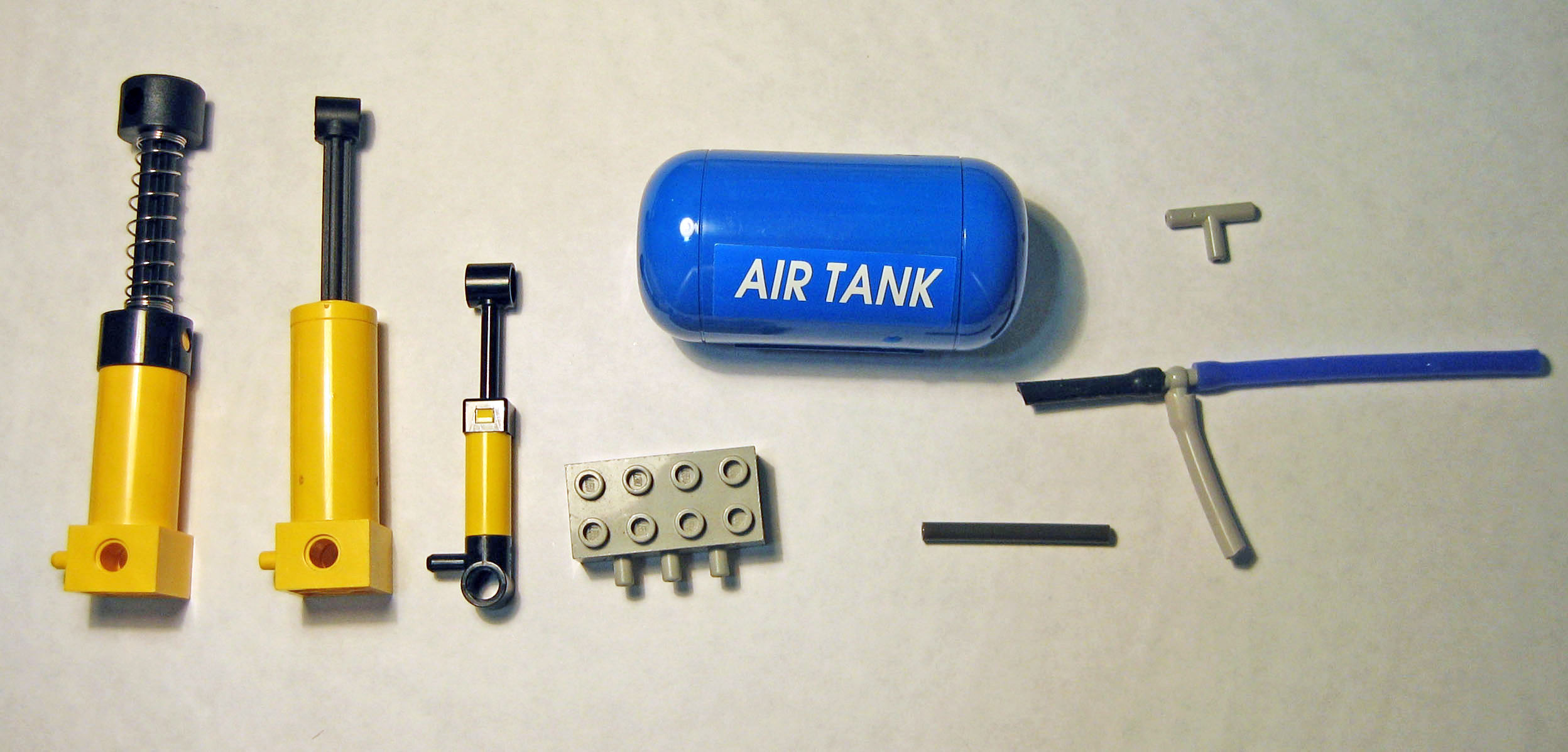
- Parent theme: Lego Technic
- Subject: Pneumatics
- Availability: 1984; 42 years ago–Present
- Total sets: 32, including re-releases

Lego pneumatics is a variety of Lego bricks which use air pressure and specialised components to perform various actions using the principles of pneumatics.

== History ==
The LEGO pneumatics components were first introduced as part of the LEGO Technic range in 1984. Since their introduction, LEGO pneumatics have featured in a variety of LEGO Technic and LEGO Education (Formerly DACTA) products.

=== Generation 1 ===
The first generation of LEGO Pneumatics ran from 1984 through 1988. This generation is characterised by single port pneumatic cylinders and the more complex plumbing including a three port distribution block with a pressure and vacuum outlet port. These pressure and vacuum lines ran to a switch to provide pressure for extension or vacuum for retraction of the pneumatic cylinders. These are often falsely compared to single acting hydraulic cylinders that require gravity to retract. The difference is that these units retract on the application of vacuum rather than gravity.

=== Generation 2 ===
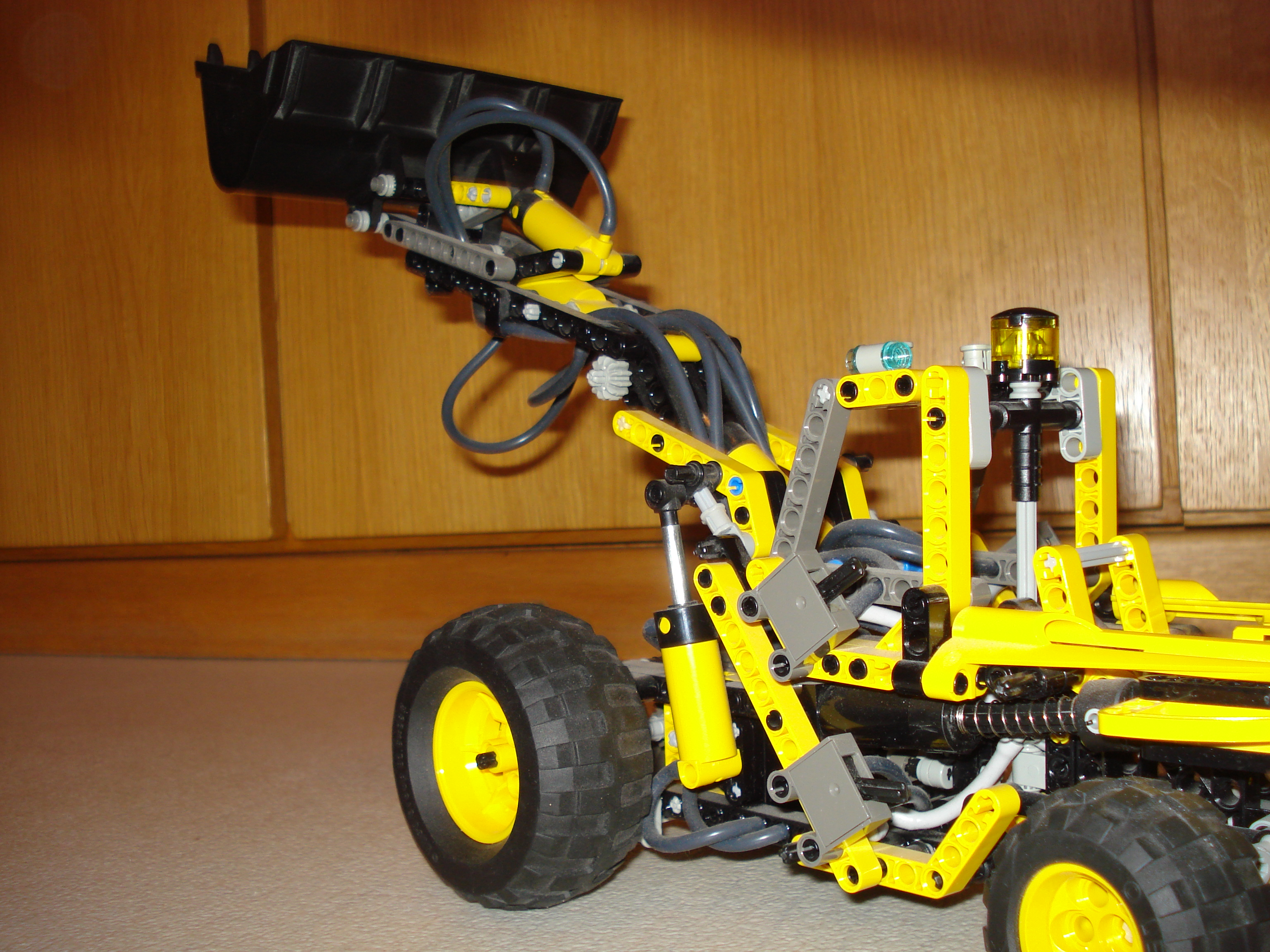
Loader with studless pneumatics from 2003

In 1989, the LEGO pneumatic line was revamped, and a new cylinder and pump piece were introduced. The old cylinders and pumps were discontinued. The chief difference is that the new cylinder had two input valves now, which allowed both pushing and pulling without needing complex circuits involving the distribution block piece. The Generation 2 cylinders also had metal rods so that they more closely resembled real hydraulic cylinders.

Over the years, several new pieces were introduced in this line as well. The new pump was spring based, and could only be operated by hand, which limited pneumatic power to how fast it could be manually pumped. This obviously limited the power of pneumatic circuits. So in 1992, LEGO introduced two new pieces; a small pump and a small cylinder. The small pump did not have a spring on it, and it was designed to be operated by a motor, which would allow for continuously running pneumatic creations. The small pump only appeared in two sets — 8868 Air Tech Claw Rig (1992) and 8049 Tractor with Log Loader (2010) — and a few service packs. A new version of the small pump was released in Lego set 8110 Unimog U400 (2011). At 2L, this pump's stroke is 1/3 longer than the old one's 1.5L, 'L' being the LEGO unit of a stud. This made it much easier to use in studless construction.

In 1997, LEGO introduced the air tank which acts like a battery, storing compressed air so that even more powerful pneumatic circuits can be created. This piece is very popular with the enthusiast community, but many feel that it was underutilised by LEGO, as it only appeared in 3 model sets and a parts pack. This tank was later re-released in a LEGO Education add-on pack, along with a new manometer part.

In 2003, LEGO discontinued the old cylinder and switch parts, and made new "studless" versions to fit in with their transition towards removing studs from Technic sets.

=== Generation 2.1 ===
In 2015, LEGO decided to make a second version of the pneumatic cylinders and switches with changes that included modifying the ports, giving them a small taper which makes tubing easier to slide on. Many smaller parts, like T-pieces and axle/hose connectors, stayed the same.

=== Linear Actuator ===
Beginning 2008, LEGO has released several sets with mechanical linear actuators, which are used for the same purpose as the pneumatic cylinders, but the fact that they can easily be extended to intermediate points means that they approximate hydraulic cylinders more closely.

== Lego pneumatics components ==
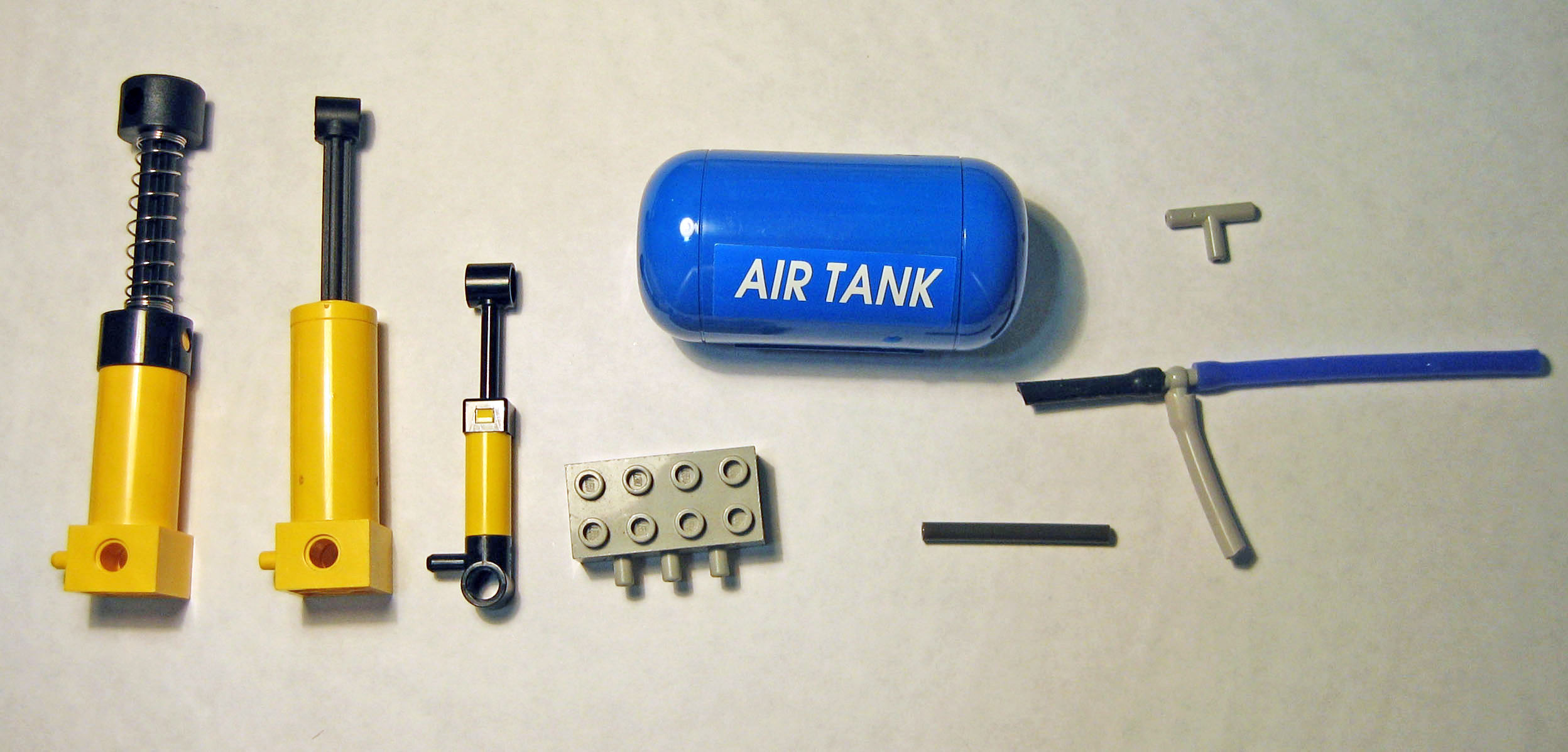
some Lego pneumatics components (hover with mouse to see descriptions)

The key components of Lego pneumatics are:

=== Pneumatic pump ===
Pumps are the primary source of air in a pneumatic circuit. There are three versions of the pump: the old Generation 1 pump, the new Generation 2 pump (both of these are spring-loaded) and the small pump without a spring (designed for use with motors as a compressor). The Generation 1 pump was red, and provided both overpressure and underpressure in each pumping cycle, used for extension and contraction of the cylinders respectively, routed through a distribution block. In contrast, the Generation 2 pump is yellow and only provides overpressure, much like a regular bicycle pump, and has a one-way valve to prevent backflow. It also has a larger contact pad at the top of the pump and contains a relief valve to limit the maximum pressure in the system. Generation 3 pumps are now available in translucent blue.

=== Pneumatic cylinder ===
Cylinders look like pumps, but they are the outputs of the energy rather than the inputs. There are five versions of cylinders. The Generation 1 cylinders came in two lengths, only had one input and worked on pressure or vacuum. The Generation 2 cylinders have 2 inputs (and come in studded, studless, and small versions), and work on pressure in both directions. They allow pushing and pulling, depending on which input air is pumped into. The Generation 2 cylinders also have bright metal rods so that they more closely resemble real pneumatic/hydraulic cylinders.

=== Pneumatic valve (switch) ===
Valves have three ports on them, and a black Lego axle which controls which of the ports are connected to each other.

Valve	Left Port	Center Port	Right Port
Right position	Connected to Center	Connected to Left	Open
Center Position	Closed	Closed	Closed
Left position	Open	Connected to Right	Connected to Center

When a port is "open", that means it is like an open tire valve; all the air will leak out as fast as it can. When a port is closed, no air can enter or leave that port. When ports are connected, air will freely travel through the valve between those two ports.

=== Pneumatic tubing ===
Tubing is simply the means by which air power is transferred through the circuit. Tubing can connect to a switch, air tank, T-junction, cylinder, pump, distribution block, or flex-hose.

Flex-hoses aren't actually considered pneumatic pieces; they were designed as part of the Technic system for a different purpose, but Lego fans have discovered that pneumatic tubing actually fits over flex hoses pretty well, so many people use them as tubing extenders whenever they are needed. Flex hoses are more rigid than tubing.

Lego pneumatic came in an uncut form in earlier sets, and were required to be cut into smaller pieces using scissors. In newer sets, such as the 8049 technic tractor and log loader, the 8110 Unimog U400, the 42053 Volvo EW160E Digger and the 42043 Mercedes Benz Arocs 3245, the tubes are already cut to size.

=== Pneumatic T-junction ===
A T-junction is a very small piece that allows three pieces of tubing to connect into one junction, essentially splitting (or joining) airflow from two hoses into one. These only allow 1:2 branching, but by combining T-junctions, any number of branches can be achieved (i.e.: one tube can branch into three by using two T-junctions).

=== Air tank ===
Air tanks are an important piece to most larger pneumatic designs, as they allow air power to be easily stored for later retrieval.

The original blue air tank was only available in 3 regular sets in 1997 and 1998. One of these sets was re-released in 2001 and 2004. From 1998 until 2002 it was also available in Lego Dacta and supplementary sets.

In 2008 Lego Education re-released the tank in white, as part of an add-on set (9641). This set was only sold for 6 months. In 2010 the white version was sold as a service pack.

=== Pneumatic distribution block ===
These pieces used a special kind of one-way valve inside of them, and three ports on the outside. The leftmost port could only have air going into it, no air would ever come out. The middle port could have air going in or out. The right port could only have air coming out of it, no air could go into it.

Using these, it was possible to make the Generation 1 cylinders retract as well as extend, however the retracting was not as strong as the extending. This prompted Lego to redesign the pneumatics into an easier-to-use and stronger system.

These were discontinued when Lego switched to Generation 2 in 1988.

== Pneumatic principles ==
Lego pneumatics offer the opportunity to learn and experiment with the principles of pneumatics and control circuits. Advanced use of Lego pneumatics has been made in various Lego Mindstorms creations.

Lego pneumatic projects usually include a compressor made from a combination of a lego electric motor and pneumatic pump, together with a pressure switch which will activate the motor when greater pressure is required.

The pneumatic elements are most commonly used to resemble and take the function of hydraulic cylinders in appropriate models, actuating a digging arm or crane, for example. They can, however, also be used to build a pneumatic engine, which converts air pressure into rotary motion using the same principles as a steam engine. However, the cylinders are not optimised for this purpose, and such engines tend to be slow and lack power unless the cylinder inlets are enlarged. Because a slight delay is involved between increased pressure and cylinder movement, various feedback loops can be used whereby one pneumatic component can activate another in a series of mechanical events.

== Alternative pneumatic systems ==
Fischertechnik offers a similar pneumatics system for robotic and control technology hobbyists. The Fischertechnik system includes an electrically activated air solenoid, a feature not available in the Lego range.

A number of hobbyists have also constructed additional components such as larger air tanks and solenoids to complement the standard Lego pneumatic components.

== See also ==
- Lego
- Lego Mindstorms
- Lego Technic
