= Bionicle =

Toy line and associated narrative by the Lego Group

- Parent theme: Lego Technic (2001–2003)
- Availability: 2001–2010, 2015–2016, 2023
- Total sets: 460

Bionicle (stylised in all caps) is a discontinued line of Lego construction toys that was marketed primarily towards 8- to 14-year-olds. The line was launched in 2001, originally as a subsidiary of Lego's Technic series called Constraction; a portmanteau of "construction" and "action figure". However, some of the very first sets came from a McDonald's toy line. Constraction figures were introduced in the 1999 Lego theme, Slizer (or Throwbots in the United States), and are characterised by combining Technic elements, ball and socket joints, and stylised Lego pieces to look like traditional action figures. Over the following decade, Bionicle became one of the company's biggest-selling properties, turning into a franchise and subsequently becoming one of the factors in saving Lego from its near bankruptcy in the late 90's. Despite a planned twenty-year tenure, the theme was discontinued in 2010, citing low sales, but was rebooted in 2015 for a further two years. A single new set was given out for free with large purchases in 2023.

Unlike most Lego themes, Bionicle was accompanied by an original story told across a multimedia spectrum, including books, comics, games, and animated films. It primarily depicts the exploits of the Toa, heroic "biomechanical" (part organic, part mechanical) beings with innate elemental abilities whose duty is to maintain peace throughout their world. Bionicle's success prompted later Lego themes to use similar story-telling methods.

== History ==
=== Concept ===
After suffering a decade-long downturn in the 1990s, the Lego Group went forward with the idea that a theme with a storyline behind it would appeal to consumers. Their first attempt was the space opera franchise Star Wars, which became an instant success; however, the royalty payments to Lucasfilm marginalised Lego's profits, prompting them to conceive their own story-driven themes.

The concept for Bionicle originated from an idea by co-creator Christian Faber named "Cybots", a line of humanoid action figures with attachable limbs and ball-and-socket joints. Faber recalled: "I was sitting with Lego Technic and thought I would love to build a character instead of a car. I thought of this biological thing: The human body is built from small parts into a functional body just like a model. What if you got a box full of spare parts and built a living thing?". He pitched the idea to Lego, but was initially implemented as the themes Slizer/Throwbots in 1999 and RoboRiders in 2000.

A new project called "BoneHeads of Voodoo Island" was later conceived by Faber and Lego employees Bob Thompson and Martin Riber Andersen from a brief by Erik Kramer that was sent to outside writers, one of whom was Alastair Swinnerton, who rewrote the concept and was later invited to pitch it to the Lego Group at their headquarters in Billund, Denmark. The revised concept was well received and Swinnerton was commissioned to expand his initial pitch into a full "bible". On his second visit to Billund, the project was given approval and entitled "Bionicle" at an internal Lego meeting (a portmanteau constructed from the words "biological chronicle", with reference to the word "bionics"). The names "BioKnights" and "Afterman" were also considered prior to the finalisation of the brand.

To accompany this theme, Lego worked with Swinnerton and the creative agency Advance to create an elaborate story with extensive lore centering on artificial part-organic, part-robotic (3:17 ratio) characters and telling it across a vast multimedia spectrum including comic books, novels, games, films and online content. Māori culture became a key inspiration behind the story and the theme at large. The use of tropical environments and characters based on classical elements were also carried over from Slizer/Throwbots and RoboRiders. The toys themselves would be an expansion of the Lego Technic sub-series, featuring the same building system that was already featured in the aforementioned themes. One particular element – the then-innovative ball-and-socket system which created free joint movement – would feature heavily in Bionicle's run and later across other Lego themes.

=== Launch and success ===
The first wave of Bionicle sets were initially launched in December 2000 in Europe and Australasia as a "test market" to predict how well the series would sell in North America. The official website, explaining the premise of Bionicle, also debuted around the same time. After a positive reception, Bionicle premiered in North America in mid-2001, where it generated massive success and garnered the Lego Group £100 million in its first year. New sets were released every six months, ranging from buildable action figures to play sets and vehicles, and would gradually increase in size and flexibility with every new wave. Collectibles such as weapon ammo and the "Kanohi" masks that certain characters wore were also sold; some became rare and valuable and withheld secret codes when entered onto the official Bionicle website, provided the user with "Kanoka Points" that enabled them to access exclusive membership material.

As Bionicle's popularity rose, it became one of Lego's most successful properties, accounting for nearly all of their financial turnover from the previous decade. It was named as the #1 Lego theme in 2003 and 2006 in terms of sales and popularity, with other Lego themes at the time failing to match the profits generated by Bionicle. Its popularity led to high web traffic on its official website, averaging more than one million page views per month, which included further kinds of merchandise such as clothes, toiletries and fast-food restaurant toy collectibles.

=== Discontinuation ===
In November 2009, Lego made the decision to cease production on new Bionicle sets after a final wave was released in 2010. The decision was made due to recent low sales and a lack of new consumer interest in the brand, thought to be brought on by its decade-long backstory and extensive lore. Lore was becoming too confusing for newcomers to understand. Bionicle was then replaced with hero factory.

At his request, long-term Bionicle comic book writer and story contributor Greg Farshtey was given permission to continue the Bionicle storyline, with chapters for new serials arranged to be posted regularly on the website BionicleStory.com. However, Farshtey stopped posting new content in 2011 due to his other commitments and the website was shut down in 2013, leaving a number of serials incomplete. Farshtey regularly contributed new story details and "canonisation" of fan-made models via online forums and message boards until his departure from Lego in 2022. Nevertheless, he continues to play an active role in the Bionicle fan community.

=== Reboot ===
Work on a reboot of Bionicle began in 2012. Matt Betteker, a junior designer who had previously worked on Hero Factory; was promoted to senior designer for the project. The theme's comeback was announced in September 2014, with the first wave of sets and story details revealed at New York Comic Con on 9 October. Dubbed colloquially as "Generation 2" by fans and later Lego themselves, the new storyline was based on the premise of the original, albeit with simplified lore and a smaller trans-media platform.

The reboot launched in January 2015 to a mixed reception from toy critics and fans of the original Bionicle franchise, with the playability of the new sets and the inspiration taken from the theme's first wave being praised, but the simplified story and undeveloped characters receiving less positive feedback.

Lego discontinued the reboot in late 2016, citing low sales, despite plans to release new sets through to at least 2017. It is widely believed by fans that a lack of marketing and reliance on fans to promote the theme, coupled with the new simplified story, were factors in Generation 2's decreased interest.

=== Legacy ===
During and after its run, Bionicle became the inspiration for several other Lego themes including Knights Kingdom, Exo-Force, Ninjago, Legends of Chima, and Nexo Knights. They all followed a similar story narrative about a group of heroes, each with varying abilities, battling the henchmen of an ally-turned-foe in a fantasy world. Bionicle writer Greg Farshtey would also go on to write material for the some of these themes, most notably Ninjago.

A direct successor theme to Bionicle, Hero Factory, was launched in 2010. Like Bionicle, Slizer/Throwbot, RoboRiders, and Galidor, Hero Factory was composed of Constraction sets. In 2012, Constraction sets were standardised to use the Character and Creature Building System (CCBS). CCBS was carried over into other Lego sets and themes in the following years, including Bionicle's 2015 reintroduction. Hero Factory itself ceased after 2014.

Despite its ending as a toyline, Bionicle's popularity has persisted and was acknowledged by Lego in its 90th anniversary poll, winning the first round. A promotional Lego System set celebrating Bionicle was released in 2023, featuring brick-built versions of the characters of Tahu and Takua, to which the community responded well. Additionally, fans have engaged in several community-based projects, including creating a "Bionicle Day" for 10 August (stylised as "810NICLE Day"), story and media archives, and several fan games. Bionicle was referenced in Lego's Minifigure Series 29 in a form of a cosplayer dressed like Tahu. The Minifigure set released in May 2026. Bionicle was also referenced in the Ninjago City Markets set (set 71799) with a minifigure (Blazey H. Speed) wearing a shirt with Tahu's mask on the front surrounded with a fiery aura.

== Story ==
=== Generation 1 (2001–2010) ===
A promotional image of the original Tahu set (2001)

Set in a science fantasy universe featuring biomechanical beings, the main story depicts the exploits of the Toa, heroes with elemental powers whose duty is to protect the Matoran, the prime populace of their world, and reawaken their god-like guardian, Mata Nui the Great Spirit, who was forced into a coma by the actions of his antagonist "brother", the Makuta.

The first story arc (2001–2003) takes place on a tropical island also named Mata Nui and deals with the arrival of the six Toa Mata: Tahu, Gali, Kopaka, Lewa, Pohatu, and Onua, and their exploits in protecting the Matoran villagers from Makuta's minions. They are later transformed into the more-powerful Toa Nuva. A heavy emphasis is placed on the Kanohi masks worn by the Toa, which supplement their elemental powers with abilities such as super-strength, super-speed, levitation and water-breathing. The second arc (2004–2005) acts as a prequel to the first: set on an island city called Metru Nui, it follows another group of Toa who would go on to become Turaga, the Matoran's elders, and explains how they all came to settle on Mata Nui island. The culminating third arc (2006–2008) sees a new team of Toa (transformed from Matoran) set out on a quest to find the Mask of Life, a legendary artifact that can save the now-dying Mata Nui. A fourth arc (2009), originally envisioned as a soft reboot of the franchise, introduces the desert world of Bara Magna, its inhabitants, and Mata Nui's origins. However, Lego discontinued Bionicle in 2010 and all planned storylines were scrapped and replaced with one that concluded the main narrative.

Characters such as the Toa and Matoran are divided into tribes based on six "primary" elements: fire, water, air, earth, ice, and stone. Less common "secondary" elements, such as light, gravity and lightning, were slowly introduced over the course of the saga. The 2009 storyline, which features a different society, uses a similar grouping method for its Glatorian and Agori characters.

The entire saga was developed by a team of Lego employees led by Bob Thompson for a multimedia platform spanning animations, comic books, novels, console and online games, short stories, and a series of direct-to-video films. The majority of comics and novels were written by Greg Farshtey, who also published a number of in-character blogs, serials, and podcasts that expanded the franchise lore. After the toyline was discontinued, publication of these serials continued through to 2011 before halting abruptly due to Farshtey's other commitments.

=== Generation 2 (2015–2016) ===
A reboot of the original story, the revival chronicles the adventures of six elemental Toa heroes who protect the bio-mechanical inhabitants of the mystical island of Okoto from Makuta and his minions. Characters are again divided into six elemental tribes: fire, water, jungle (changed from air for creative reasons), earth, ice, and stone. The reboot's multimedia spectrum was scaled back in comparison to the first generation's – online animations, a series of books and graphics novels authored by Ryder Windham, and the animated Netflix series Lego Bionicle: The Journey to One (2016) detail the narrative. Greg Farshtey was not involved in this generation of Bionicle.

== Reception ==
Initially, the idea of Bionicle faced resistance from company traditionalists as the Lego Group had no experience of marketing a story-based brand of their own. The "war-like" appearance of the characters also went against the company's values of creating sets without themes of modern warfare or violence. Lego reconciled on this statement by claiming that the theme was about "good versus evil"; "good hero warriors" designed to combat "evil enemy fighters" in a mythical universe, "so children aren't encouraged to fight each other".

The Bionicle franchise was well received over its venture and became one of the Lego Group's biggest-selling properties. At the time of its launch, one reviewer described the sets as "a good combination of assembly and action figure" and first-year sales of £100 million. Bionicle later received a Toy of the Year Award for Most Innovative Toy in 2001 from the Toy Industry Association.

Bionicle's rapid success had a major impact on the Lego company. Stephanie Lawrence, the global director of licensing for Lego, stated: "We've created an evergreen franchise to complement the many event-based properties on the children's market. An increasing number of category manufacturers want to tap into the power of the Bionicle universe, and the key for us now is to manage the excitement to stay true to the brand and the lifestyle of our core consumer".

Since its launch, toy critics have said that Bionicle has changed the way children think and play with Lego products by combining "The best of Lego building with the story telling and adventure of an action figure". Toy statistics have revealed that as of 2009, 85% of American boys aged 6–12 had heard of Bionicle while 45% owned the sets.

=== Māori language controversy ===
In 2001 New Zealand lawyer Maui Solomon wrote to Lego, on behalf of several Māori iwi (tribes) about some of the Māori words used to name certain characters, locations and objects in the Bionicle storyline, and in particular the trademarking of these terms. The letter was partially published in the Danish magazine Politiken. For example, many Māori were especially concerned about the use of the word tohunga ("priest; expert in traditional lore; person skilled in specific activity; healer") as the name given to the "cowed inhabitants" of the island in Bionicle lore. Lego sent a representative to meet with the Māori and agreed to change the names of certain story elements (e.g., the villagers originally known as "Tohunga" were changed to "Matoran") and met with an agreement with the Māori people to still use a small minority of their words.

In the story, the reason for certain name changes was a naming ceremony for certain Matoran after doing heroic deeds (though the pronunciations remain the same), an example being the name change of "Huki" to "Hewkii". Other names such as "Toa", meaning 'warrior', "Kanohi", meaning 'face', and "Kōpaka", meaning 'ice', were not changed.

According to the Guardian, 'Roma Hippolite of the Ngati Koata Trust said: "We have been impressed by the willingness of Lego to recognise a hurt was inadvertently made and show that in their actions."'

In 2002 the BZPower fan site was attacked by a user who declared "open season" on the site if they did not comply with the user's demands in relation to the Māori terms. The forums were taken offline for a while, by their host.
