= Bilofix =

Construction toy

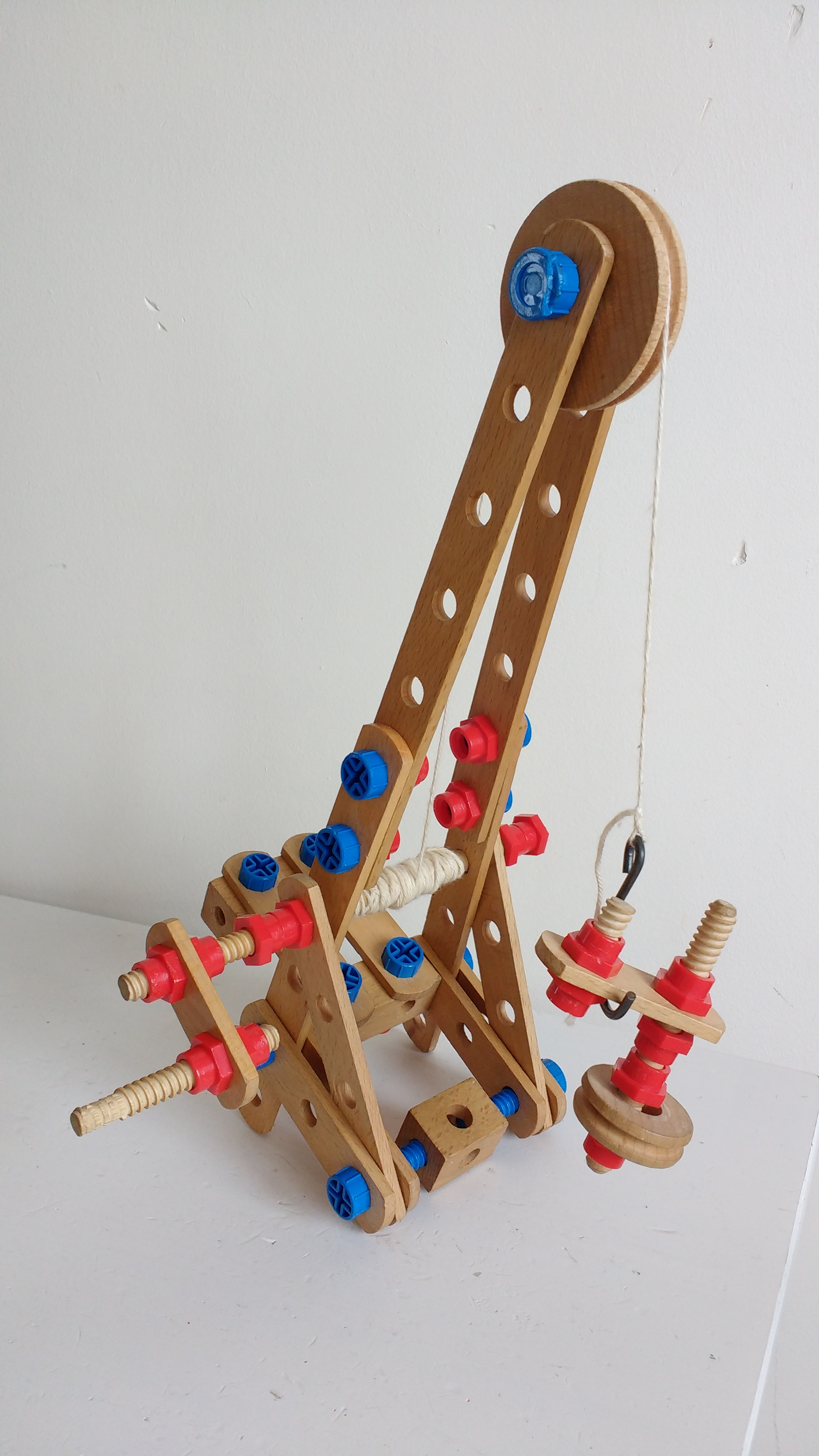
- Toy crane made with Bilofix
- Type: Construction set
- Company: The Lego Group and Bilofix company
- Country: Denmark
- Availability: 1959–1960s

Bilofix is the name of a Danish construction toy product primarily consisting of wooden beams and plastic screws and bolts. It was produced and marketed primarily in the 1960s first by the Lego company and then by a separate Bilofix company. The name Bilofix is usually written stylized as "BILOfix".

== History ==
The "Bilo" part of the name is a combination of the first three letters of Billund, Denmark, birthplace of Lego and Bilofix, and the first initial of Ole Kirk Christiansen, founder and inventor of Lego and Bilofix. When LEGO decided in 1960 to stop producing wooden toys, two sons of Lego founder Ole Kirk Christiansen, Karl Georg and Gerhardt (brothers of Godtfred Kirk Christiansen), decided to leave the Lego company and to start Bilofix as their own independent business in a new factory in Kolding, Denmark.
