= Capsella =

Capsella may refer to:

- Capsella (bivalve), a mollusc genus in the family Donacidae
- Capsella (plant), a plant genus in the family Brassicaceae

== See also ==
- Capsela, a construction toy
