= Mindstorm =

Mindstorm or Mindstorms may refer to:

- Mindstorm (film), a 2001 science-fiction telefilm
- Subliminal Seduction, a 1996 film also known as Mind Storm
- Lego Mindstorms, a series of programmable robotics kits
- MinDStorm, a 2006 educational video game
- Mindstorm Studios, a computer video game developer and software developer company
- Mindstorms (book), 1980 book by Seymour Papert
- "Mind Storm", a song by Joe Satriani on his album Strange Beautiful Music
