= The Robotic Workshop =

Robotic toy kit

The Robotic Workshop was a toy kit, much like Lego Mindstorms, that allowed users to build and program robots using a home computer.

Access Software announced The Robotic Workshop in the January 1987 issue of Ahoy! magazine. A review later appeared in the May 1988 issue of Compute! magazine. The kit included over 50 Capsela parts, including two motors, gears, wheels, and sensors. It also included an electronic control unit that plugged into the user port of a Commodore 64, an instruction manual with 50 tutorial projects, and special programming software on a floppy disk. It was later released for Apple II, Atari 8-bit computers, and IBM PC.
