= Lego Spybotics =

Lego product series

- Parent theme: Mindstorms
- Subject: Spy robotics
- Availability: 2002–2002
- Official website

Lego Spybotics is a discontinued Mindstorms robotics sub-series by Lego. There are four different sets, each of which includes a Spybot, a controller, a cable, and a software disc. The Spybots are color-coded, and each one has a different set of equipment attached. The software disc allows the user to program the robots and set up simulated missions for them.

== Sets ==
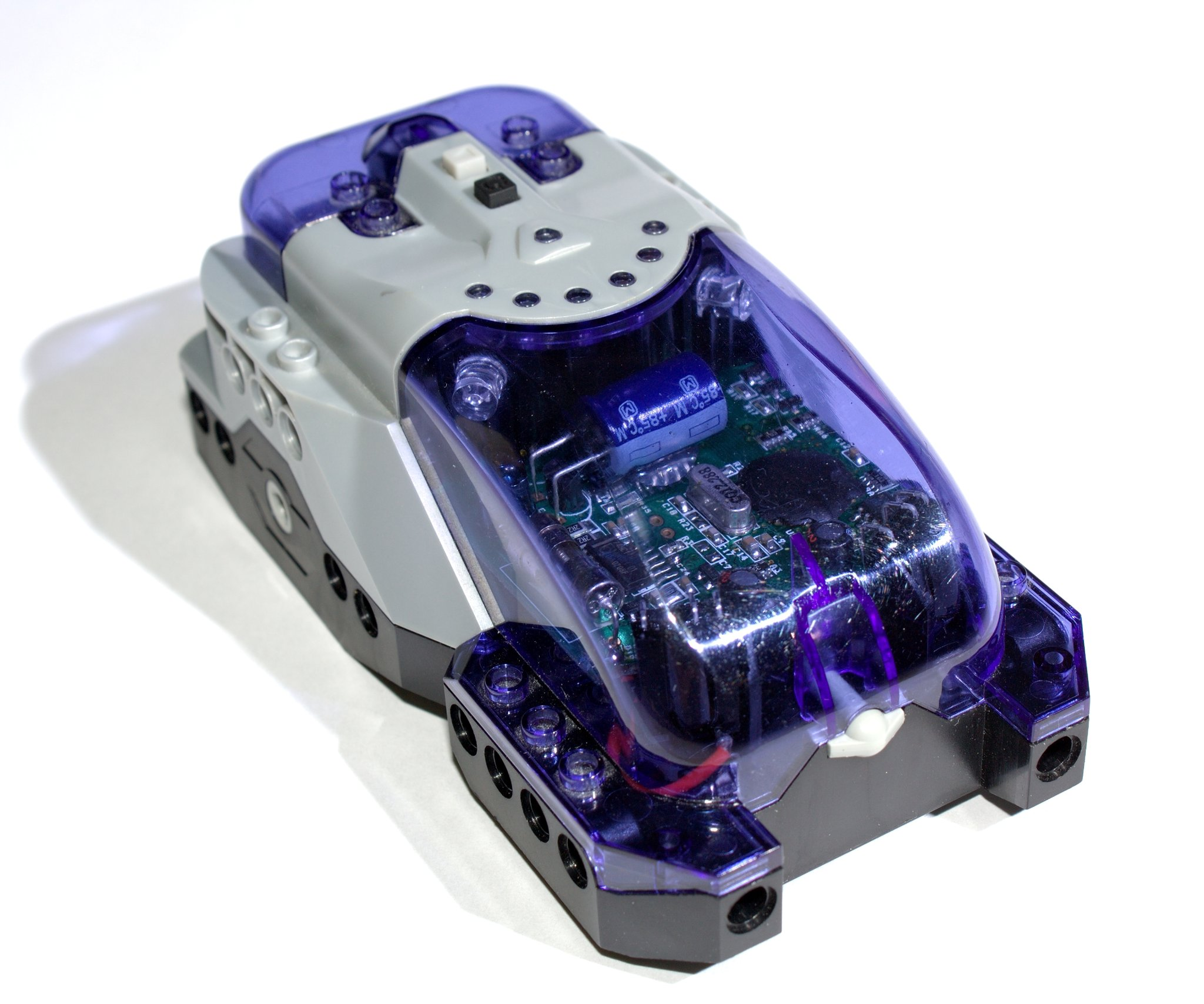
The purple control module for the Shadowstrike S70 (#3808).

Each of the four sets includes a color-coded Spybot control module, a software disc, a serial cable with an infrared (IR) transceiver at the end, a color-coded IR remote control for the Spybot, and parts to build the body of the Spybot. Each control module contains 2 motors, an IR transceiver, a power button, and various sensors.

Spybotics
Name	Set ID	Parts	Notes
Snaptrax S45	3807	202	Red
Technojaw T55	3809	261	Green
Gigamesh G60	3806	244	Blue
Shadowstrike S70	3808	235	Purple

== Software ==
Each Spybotics set includes a CD-ROM software disc which allows you to program the spybots.

=== Programming ===
Spybots are programmed primarily through the mission system, but they can be programmed in a similar manner to the RCX. Most RCX-compatible programming languages can be used. Programs are uploaded to the control module using a special serial-to-IR cable included with the set.

=== Missions ===
The Spybotics software allows you to create simulated missions for the Spybots. The disc includes 10 preset missions, and more could be downloaded from the now-defunct Spybotics website. Five of the missions are designed for a single Spybot, and the other five are designed for two or more Spybots. Each mission includes a mission brief, set-up instructions, and some settings to make the mission easier or harder. The missions are set up by placing certain objects in the room, which the Spybots will react to according to the program included with the mission.

Single-bot missions:

- Laser Maze
- Command Override
- Gamma Overload
- Energy Crisis
- X-Factor

Multi-bot missions

- The Mole
- Critical Countdown
- Robot Rescue
- Face-Off
- Circuit Breaker

In addition to these pre-set missions, players can select "Special Operations", which allows them to create their own missions based on a set of nine templates. The templates, as well as the ten included missions, can then be modified using "capsules", which are small subprograms that change a particular aspect of the mission.

== The Nightfall Incident ==
The Lego website featured an online game called "The Nightfall Incident", created by Gamelab in 2002. The player was an agent from the "S.M.A.R.T" agency, which acted as a form of internet police by helping companies regain access to their stolen data or hijacked servers, by using Spybots. This was done by fighting "data battles", which were essentially strategic turn-based games where the player would use their software programs to eliminate enemy software.

During such battles, credits could be earned, with which the player could buy aforementioned software programs. The goal of the game was to win all data battles, of which each would be fought in a different "node" in the network, and eventually to defeat the rogue ex-S.M.A.R.T-agent Disarray, who appears to be the one who caused Nightfall (the crashing of the network, after which the game is named).
