= Lego Education =

Lego theme

- Logo from 2003 to 2025
- Other names: Lego Dacta (1960–2003)
- Subject: For use by schools, particularly STEAM fields
- Availability: 1999–present
- Total sets: 1,201
- Official website

Lego Education (formerly known as Lego Dacta) is a Lego theme designed specifically for schools that concentrates sets that can be used by education institutions and includes sets that can focus on Duplo and Technic themes and contain larger amounts of blocks. The theme was first introduced in 1999.

== Overview ==
The product line focuses on the complete Lego learning pathway from elementary through high school. Lego Education designs its learning solutions to align with various educational standards, including the Next Generation Science Standards, International Society for Technology in Education standards, and Common Core State Standards. Their products, such as Spike Prime and BricQ Motion, come with lesson plans that support educators' instruction. Educational tools developed by Lego Education, have been shown to have a positive effect on students' STEM learning outcomes. An analysis revealed that incorporating robotics into STEM education enhances learning performance and attitudes.

== History ==
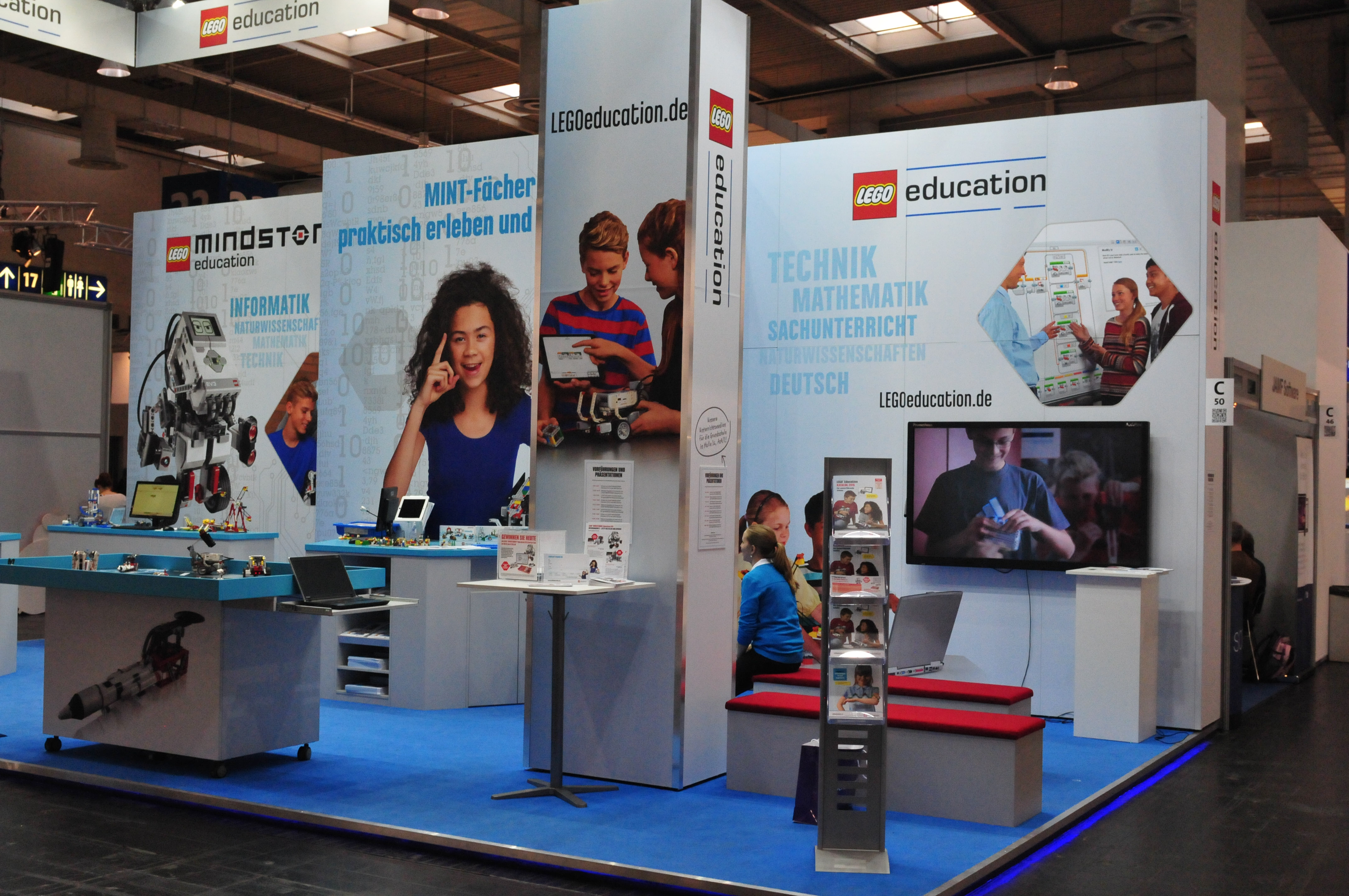
Lego Education 2015 booth in Hannover

=== Lego Dacta and MIT ===
In 1985, Seymour Papert, Mitchel Resnick, and Stephen Ocko created a company called Microworlds with the intent of developing a construction kit that could be animated by computers for educational purposes. Papert had previously created the Logo programming language as a tool to "support the development of new ways of thinking and learning", and employed "Turtle" robots to physically act out the programs in the real world. As the types of programs created were limited by the shape of the Turtle, the idea came up to make a construction kit that could use Logo commands to animate a creation of the learner's own design. Similar to the "floor turtle" robots used to demonstrate Logo commands in the real world, a construction system that ran Logo commands would also demonstrate them in the real world, but allowing the child to construct their own creations benefited the learning experience by putting them in control In considering which construction system to partner with, they wanted a "low floor high ceiling" approach, something that was easy to pick up but very powerful. To this end, they decided to use Lego bricks due to the system and diversity of pieces, and the Logo language due to the groups familiarity with the software and its ease of use. Lego was receptive to collaboration, particularly because its educational division had founding goals very similar to those of the Microworlds company. The collaboration very quickly moved to the newly minted MIT Media Lab, where there was an open sharing of ideas. As a sponsor of the entire lab, Lego was allowed royalty-free rights to mass-produce any technology produced by Papert, Resnick, and Ocko's group; and was also allowed to send an employee over to assist with research, so they sent the engineer, Alan Tofte (also spelled Toft) who helped with the design of the programmable brick. Another part of the MIT Media Lab was community outreach, thus the bricks would be used working with children in schools for both research and educational purposes.

=== Lego/Logo and the Technic Control Center (1985) ===
The first experiment of combining Lego and the Logo programming language was called Lego/Logo and it started in 1985. Similar to the "floor turtles" used to demonstrate Logo commands in the real world, Lego/Logo used Logo commands to animate Lego creations. It is important that children could build their own machines to program, as they would then care more about their projects and be more willing to explore the mathematical concepts involved in making them move. The Lego/Logo system allowed children to create their own designs and experiments, offered multiple paths for learning, and encouraged a sense of community. First, machines are built out of Lego. The machines are then connected to a computer and programmed in a modified version of Logo. The Lego/Logo system introduced new types of parts for making creations such as motors, sensors, and lights. The motors and sensors are connected to an interface box that communicates with a computer. Lego/Logo was later commercialized by the Lego group as the (Lego) Technic Control Center. It was observed that using the Lego/Logo system, children developed a form of knowledge about the physical world that allowed those even without mathematics or verbal skills to solve problems effectively using the system.

=== Logo Brick 1st Generation, "Grey Brick" (1986) ===
While Lego/Logo was powerful, it was restricted somewhat by the requirement to have the creations attached to a computer. The group began working on further iterations of the Lego/Logo environment to produce a robot that could interact not only with the environment but with other robots programmed in the same system. The experiments with an untethered brick (called the Logo Brick or "Grey Brick") began in the fall of 1986. To speed up the design process, the Logo Brick contained the processor chip from an Apple II computer. It ran an adapted version of Lego/Logo written for the Apple II computer. The Lego/Logo interface box, the previous development of the group, had only two sensor ports available, which the design team observed were not always enough. To address this, they gave the Logo Brick four sensor ports. The Logo Brick was made out of a modified Lego battery box and was about the size of a deck of cards. The Logo Brick was tested in schools.

== Key Developments and Announcements ==
=== 2017 ===
In 2017, Lego Education was the arm of The Lego Group dedicated to developing products for educators which were intended to fit or be used with school curricula.

- Lego Education launched new coding resources in 2017. The new offerings from Lego Education include free lesson plans, online courses for educators and encouragement for schools to get involved with the popular First Lego League. These are part of a selection of new tools that Lego Education are offering to schools.
- In July 2017, Dublin City University’s Lego Education Innovation Studio teamed up with the Irish Girl Guides as part of an initiative to encourage teenage girls to become more involved with Science, Technology, Engineering and Maths (STEM).
- In November 2017, Lego Education introduced a new learning product titled STEAM Park, to introduce preschool children to science technology, engineering, arts and maths (STEAM). STEAM Park encourages preschool students to become interested in STEAM subjects by working in groups with Duplo bricks to build amusement park rides and attractions.

=== 2018 ===
- Lego Education unveiled Spike Prime, a hands-on STEAM (Science, Technology, Engineering, Arts, Math) product, unveiled by Lego Education. It brings together Lego bricks and a programmable Hub with sensors and motors. An app works with the hub to allow children to build programs containing lessons that have been designed to fit within the classroom.
- The Lego Group launched the Master Educators. In a new scheme from Lego Education, 110 master educators selected as part of the first cohort. It is hoped that teachers from all over the world can share best practice and new ideas. Intending to expand the program, The Lego Group planned to accept applications from education professionals all over the world.
- In November 2018, The Lego Group announced at the China International Import Expo that it launched its first elementary school STEAM courses for Chinese students from next year, enabling local students to become active, collaborative learners and build 21st-century skills.

=== 2019 ===
- Lego Education enlarged the Master Educator Program, increasing the total number of education professionals in the Master Educator Program to over 200 people, covering 39 US states.

=== 2020 ===
- To celebrate 40 years of Lego Education, the company launched Spike Prime. First revealed in 2018, Spike Prime is the product from Lego Education for schools. It uses the same system as BOOST, featuring a programmable Hub, sensors, and motors that are used with the SPIKE app.
- In August 2020, Lego launched new free online resources, emphasizing that they can be used anywhere, suggesting that they may help while remote learning is more commonplace.

=== 2021 ===
- In March 2021, Lego Education launched comprehensive professional development for educators.
- In June 2021, Lego Education announced that it was teaming up with NASA and the Artemis I team to bring a STEAM learning series to young students. The program was launched on 29 August 2022.
- In November 2021, Lego Education announced that two of its minifigures, Kate and Kyle, will launch into space for special STEAM learning series.

=== 2022 ===
- In June 2022, Lego Education announced that it was accepting new applications for Lego Education Ambassador Program (formerly known as Lego Education Master Educator Program). The applications were to open on 29 July 2022.

=== 2023 ===
- In March 2023, Lego Education launched Hannah's STEAM Heroes: A Career Toolkit, a classroom resource for teachers.

== Construction sets ==
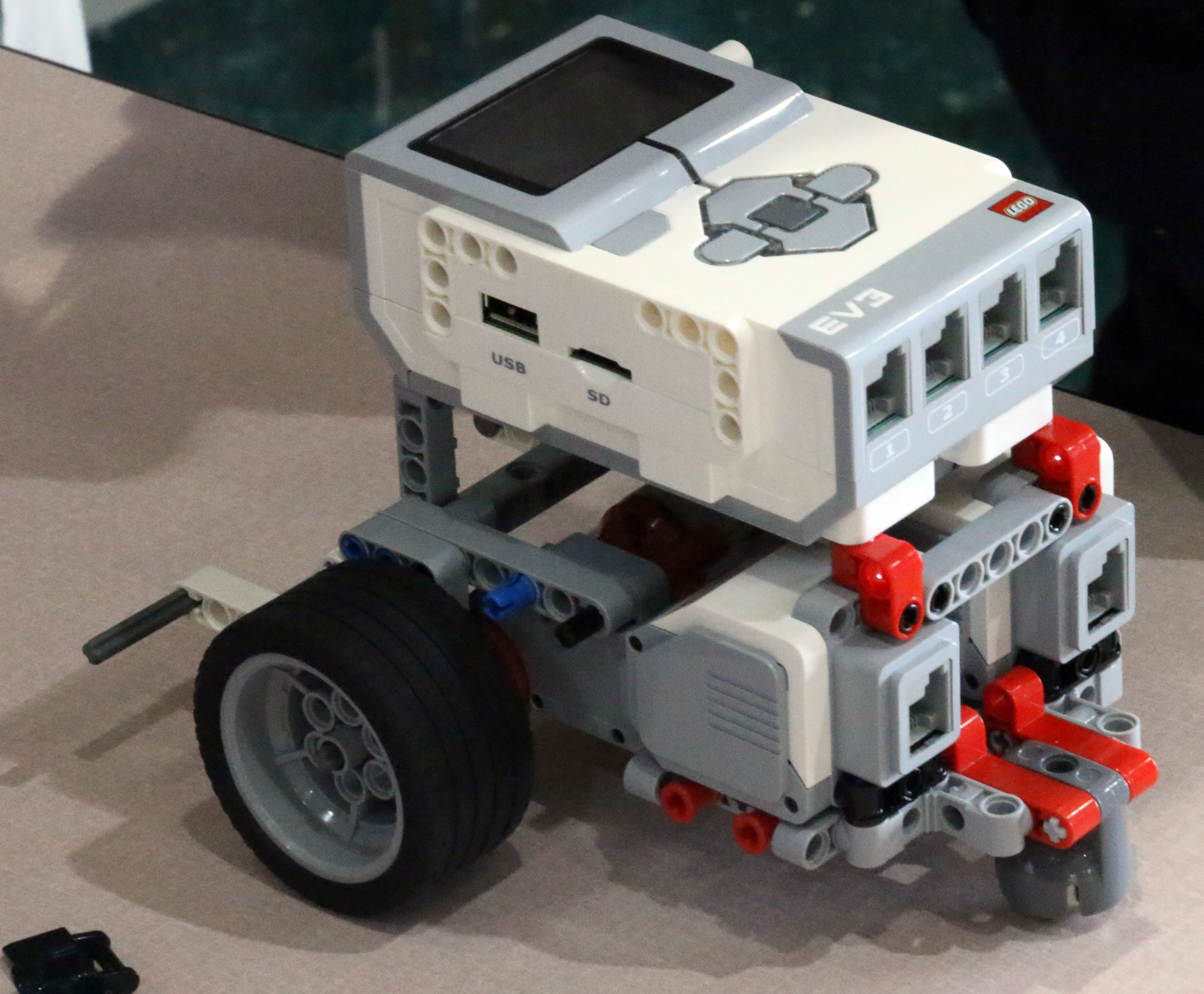
Lego robotic car

According to BrickLink, The Lego Group released a total of 1,201 Lego sets as part of Lego Education theme.

=== BricQ ===
In January 2021, The Lego Group announced two sets: BricQ Motion Prime (set number: 45400) and BricQ Motion Essential (set number: 45401). Both sets dedicated to educating kids about STEAM (Science, Technology, Engineering, the Arts and Mathematics) in a physical manner.

- BricQ Motion Prime (set number: 45400) consists of 562 pieces with four minifigures. It was designed primarily for children aged 10 and above.
- BricQ Motion Essential (set number: 45401) consists of 523 pieces with four minifigures. It was designed primarily for children aged 6 and above.

=== Duplo ===
Duplo was a subtheme of Lego Education that consists of 51 sets that launched from 2005 until 2020. In 2020, The Lego Education revealed the five sets of Duplo, including Tubes, Letters, My XL World, Animals and People. The toy sets were marketed at children aged 2 and above.

=== FIRST Lego League ===
In 2019, The Lego Group had unveiled a pair of Lego Education sets created exclusively for the FIRST Lego League season.

- Boomtown Build (set number: 45810) was released in 2020. The set consists of 738 pieces.
- Challenge Set 2020 (set number: 45813) was released in 2020. The set consists of 1,634 pieces with two minifigures.
- Cargo Connect Explore Set (set number: 45817) was released in 2021. The set consists of 884 pieces with one minifigure.

=== FIRST Lego League Jr ===
FIRST Lego League Jr was launched in 2018 and currently consists of five sets. The sets were designed primarily for children with an age rating of 4–6.

- Mission Moon (set number: 45807) was released in 2018. The set consists of 693 pieces.
- Explore Set (set number: 45814) was released in 2020. The set consists of 779 pieces.
- Discover Set (set number: 45815) was released in 2020. The set consists of 72 pieces with 3 minifigures.
- Cargo Connect Discover Set (set number: 45818) was released in 2020.
- FIRST Lego League Jr. Promotional Set (set number 2000455) was released in 2019 as a promotion. The set consists of 18 pieces.

=== Mindstorms ===
The biggest change from the Lego Mindstorms NXT and NXT 2.0 to the EV3 is the technological advances in the programmable brick. The main processor of the NXT was an ARM7 microcontroller, whereas the EV3 has a more powerful ARM9 CPU running Linux. A USB connector and Micro SD slot (up to 32 GB) are new to the EV3. It comes with the plans to build 5 different robots: EV3RSTORM, GRIPP3R, R3PTAR, SPIK3R, and TRACK3R. Lego has also released instructions online to build 12 additional projects: ROBODOZ3R, BANNER PRINT3R, EV3MEG, BOBB3E, MR-B3AM, RAC3 TRUCK, KRAZ3, EV3D4, EL3CTRIC GUITAR, DINOR3X, WACK3M, and EV3GAME. It uses a program called Lego Mindstorms EV3 Home Edition, which is powered by LabVIEW, to write code using blocks instead of lines. However, it can also be programmed on the actual robot and saved. MicroPython support was added in 2020. The Education EV3 Core Set (set number: 45544) set consists of: 1 EV3 programmable brick, 2 Large Motors, 1 Medium Motor, 2 Touch Sensors, 1 Color Sensor, 1 Gyroscopic Sensor, 1 Ultrasonic Sensor, cables, USB cable, 1 Rechargeable battery and 541 pieces of TECHNIC elements.

An expansion set for the Educational EV3 Core Set (set number: 45560), which can be bought separately, contains 853 Lego elements. However, the expansion set and the educational set combined do not contain enough components necessary to build most robots of the retail set. This contrasts with NXT; the educational set combined with the resource set could build any of the retail designs. The EV3 educational set was released a month earlier than the retail set, on August 1, 2013. Robots that can be built with the core education set are the EV3 educator robot, the GyroBoy, the Colour Sorter, the Puppy and the Robot Arm H25. Robots that can be built with the expansion set are the Tank Bot, the Znap, the Stair Climber, the Elephant and a remote control. Another robot that can be built with a pair of core sets and an expansion set is the Spinner Factory.

=== Spike Prime ===
Spike Prime was announced in April 2019. While not being part of the Mindstorms product line, the basic set includes three motors (1 large 2 medium) and sensors for distance, force and color, also it has an internal sensor, a gyroscope, a controller brick based on an STM32F413 microcontroller and 520-plus Lego Technic elements.

SPIKE Essential Set (set number: 45345) was released on 6 October 2021. The set consists of 449 pieces with 4 minifigures. The set includes an intelligent Hub, motors, a Light Matrix and a Color Sensor. The SPIKE App includes age-appropriate icon and word-based coding based on Scratch, helping develop student coding skills.

=== System ===
In 2016, Community Minifigure Set (set number: 45022) was released on 1 January 2016. The set consists of 256 pieces with 21 minifigures.

=== WeDo ===
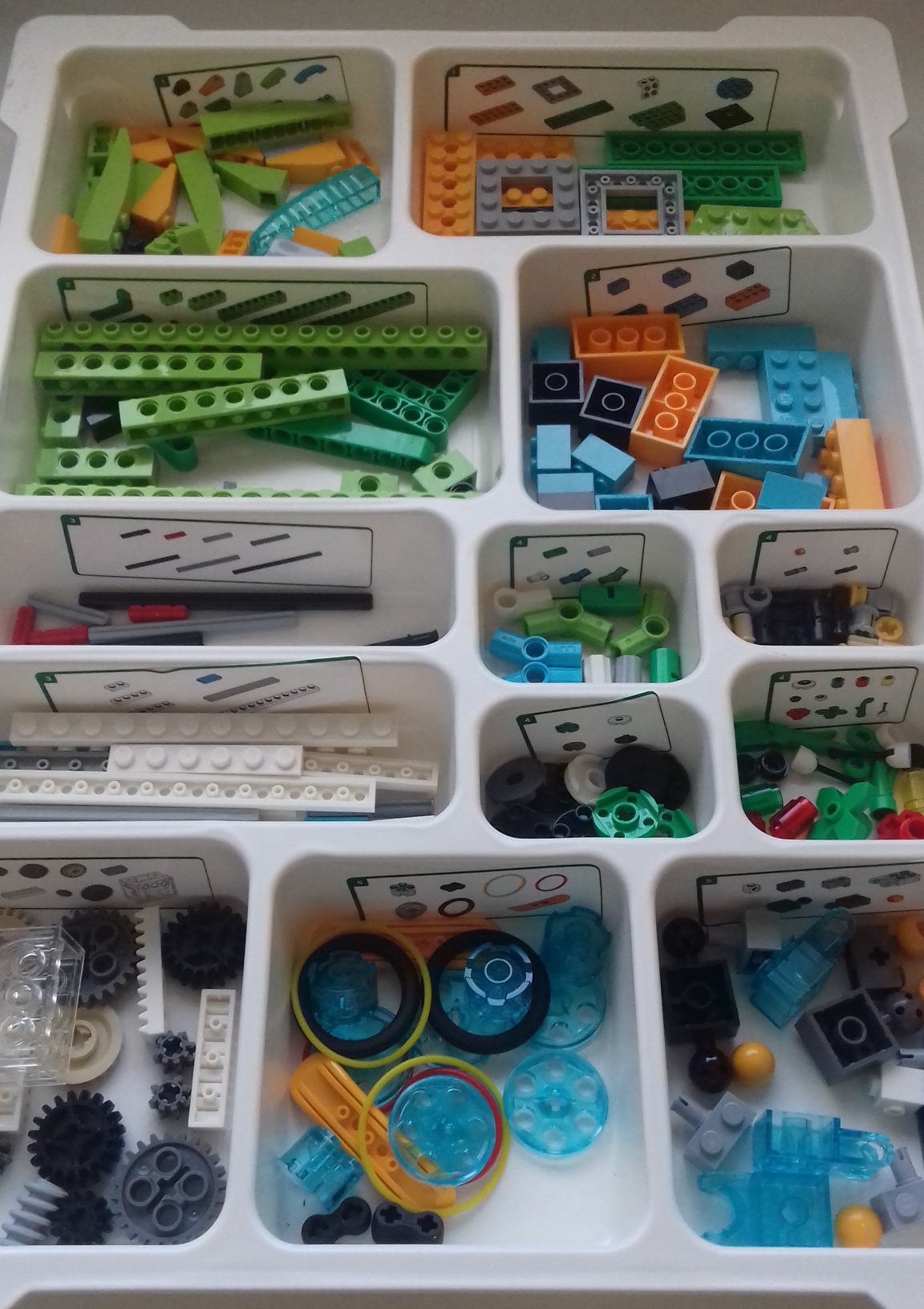
Lego WeDo 2.0 Bricks

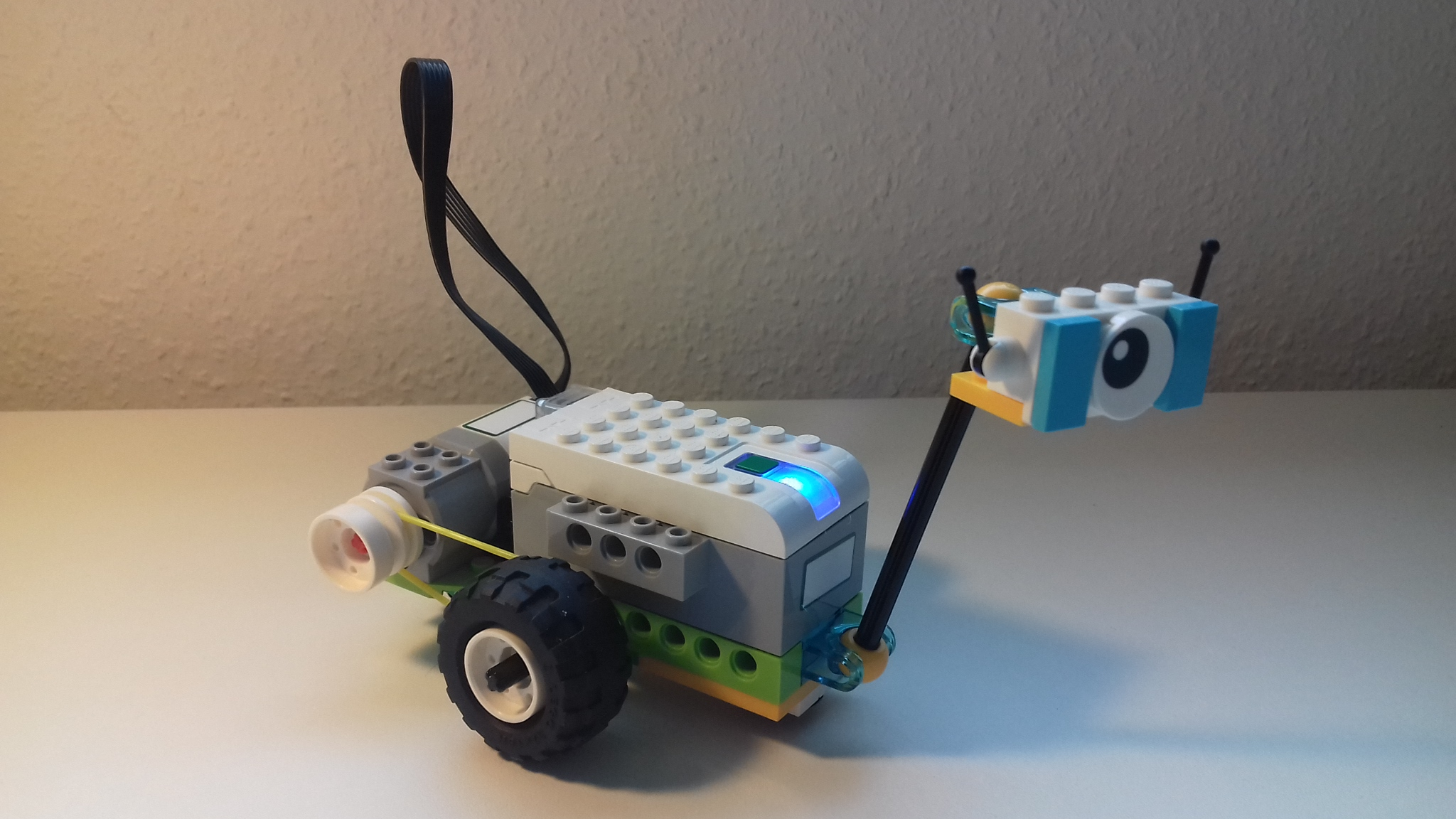
Lego WeDo 2.0

In 2009, The Lego Education launched WeDo 1.0 system in 2009 with two sets. The two sets were WeDo Construction Set (set number: 9580) and WeDo Resource Set (set number: 9585). The sets were designed primarily for children with an age rating of 7–11.

In 2016, Lego Education at CES 2016 announced the WeDo 2.0 was launched in 2016 robotics kit for elementary school students. The updated WeDo 2.0 was designed to teach kids from second to fourth grades STEM basics. The WeDo 2.0 core set (set number: 45300) included a programmable Smarthub, medium motor, two sensors and 280 pieces. Also the software included the Get Start Project which is an introductory experience to the WeDo 2.0 resource. The software is compatible with PC, Macs, Android and iOS smartphones and tablets.

== See also ==
- Duplo
- Technic
- Lego Mindstorms
- Lego City
- Lego Minifigures (theme)
