= Actor-Lab =

Actor-Lab is a program that visualizes the Lego Mindstorms internal logic through visual flowcharts. The ideas underlying actor-lab are derived from the event-driven, message-passing computer languages that began with the actor based languages devised by Hewit. Actor-lab requires constant communication with a programmable brick (e.g. the RCX) via an infra-red link. This means that the user has to mount the programmable brick vertically for models that move about, and hold the tower in some form of gantry crane. Actor-lab shows the user in real-time what is happening on the programmable brick, including simulation of motors, sensors, lights, and sounds. One can also add controls at the bottom of the screen to give oneself real-time control of your program/model. There is a similar program from Lego called Robolab, where one can actually download programs to the Lego programmable brick.

== Controls within ==
- Alt+Mouse Drag on an actor will move him to any location specified.
- Double Click on an actor will edit his current messages.
- Alt+Click on a control will edit the current actions that the control sends to actors.

Notice that there is one control that cannot be edited. This control is Power OFF or Stop.
