= DIY Kindle Scanner =

Robotic device

The DIY Kindle Scanner, or Do It Yourself Kindle Scanner, is a robotic device made from Lego Mindstorms which was designed and built by Peter Purgathofer from 2012 to 2013. The robot interfaces with Purgathofer's personal computer and a Kindle to make a copy of the Kindle e-book. This robot in effect bypasses the digital rights management system set in place to protect Kindle e-books.

== Background ==
Peter Purgathofer is an associate professor at the Vienna University of Technology in Austria.

When he released a video on Vimeo documenting the operation of the device, Purgathofer wrote that the project was meant to be an artistic reflection connecting the ideas of “book scanning, copyright, and digital rights management.”

In a reply to an email, Purgathofer stated that the project was not meant to be a negative reaction against Kindle e-books, but rather a way to use both Lego Mindstorms and the Kindle in a way that neither was usually intended to be used.

== Operation ==
Operation of the DIY Kindle Scanner.

The robot is first set up so that it can operate the computer as well as hold the Kindle. The image capture software must already be running on the computer and the Kindle must be open to the first page of the book to be scanned into the computer. The robot then runs through a loop where it hits the spacebar to activate the camera on the computer and then uses finger-like robotic appendages to turn to the next page on the Kindle. This loop is then repeated until all pages have been scanned into the computer. Optical character recognition (OCR) software is then used to convert the scanned images into a duplicate of the original Kindle e-book in a plain text file.

== Reaction ==
Several critics have recognized that more direct means of bypassing digital rights management are available. In this context, the DIY Kindle Scanner has been labeled as a type of Rube Goldberg machine.

Additionally, Cory Doctorow made the claim that the project was in fact a legal means of bypassing digital rights management. This claim has been supported with the argument that the DIY Kindle Scanner simply exploits the analog hole which is applicable to all digital rights management systems.

In light of the question of the legality of this project, Purgathofer has scanned only one e-book with this method and he explains that he has not shared the copy with anyone because he is worried that "It would get me in deep trouble."

Furthermore, Purgathofer states that this project should not be associated with his academic work. In explanation, he said, "It’s a private project."

== General References ==
- "DIY Kindle Scanner", Post-Digital Publishing Archive. Retrieved October 6, 2015.
- Hoffelder, Nate. "Kindle Plus Legos Plus Mac Equals DIY Scanner (video)", The Digital Reader. Retrieved October 27, 2015.
- Love, Dylan. "This Lego Robot Can Outwit Amazon's Kindle And Make Copies Of Your E-Books", Business Insider. Retrieved October 6, 2015.
