= DialogOS =

- Developer: DialogOS Project
- Stable release: DialogOS 2.0 / August 15, 2018; 7 years ago
- Operating system: Windows, Linux, MacOS
- Type: Robotics suite
- License: open source (GPL3)
- Website: www.dialogos.app

DialogOS is a graphical programming environment to design computer system which can converse through voice with the user. Dialogs are clicked together in a Flowchart. DialogOS includes bindings to control Lego Mindstorms robots by voice and has bindings to SQL databases, as well as a generic plugin architecture to integrate with other types of backends.

DialogOS is used in computer science courses in schools and universities to teach programming and to introduce beginners in the basic principles of human/computer interaction and dialog design. It has also been used in research systems.

DialogOS was initially developed commercially by CLT Sprachtechnologie GmbH until its liquidation in 2017. The rights were then acquired by Saarland University and the software was released as open-source.

== Bindings to Lego Mindstorms NXT ==
DialogOS can control the LEGO Mindstorms NXT Series. It uses sensor-nodes to obtain values for the following sensors:

- noise sensor
- ultrasonic sensor
- touch sensor
- luminosity sensor
