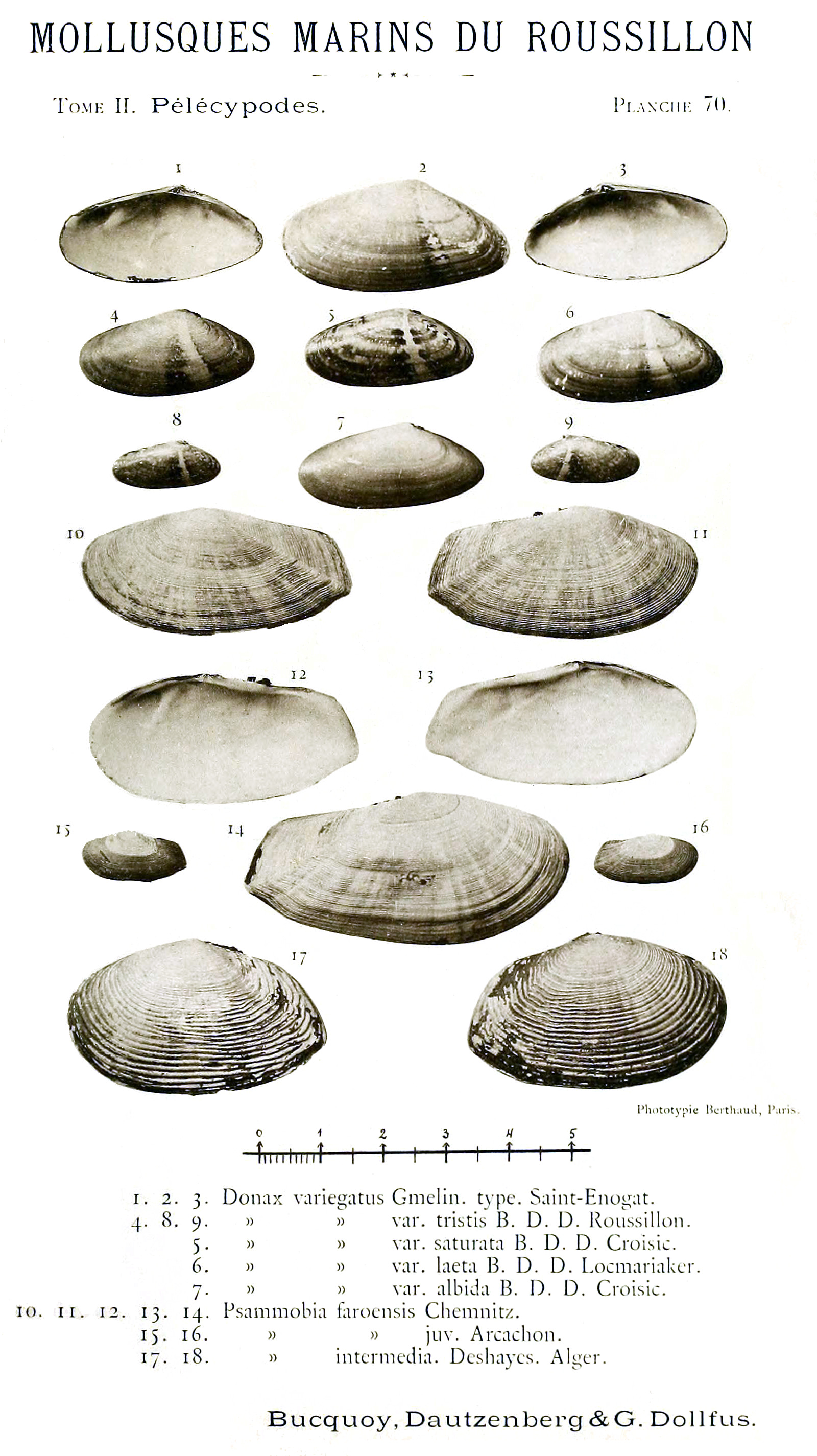
- Capsella variegata

Scientific classification
- Domain: Eukaryota
- Kingdom: Animalia
- Phylum: Mollusca
- Class: Bivalvia
- Order: Cardiida
- Family: Donacidae
- Genus: Capsella; Gray, 1851

Species
- Capsella variegata

= Capsella (bivalve) =

Genus of bivalves

Capsella is a mollusc genus in the family Donacidae, the bean clams or wedge shells.
