= Lego Mindstorms =

Hardware and software platform by Lego

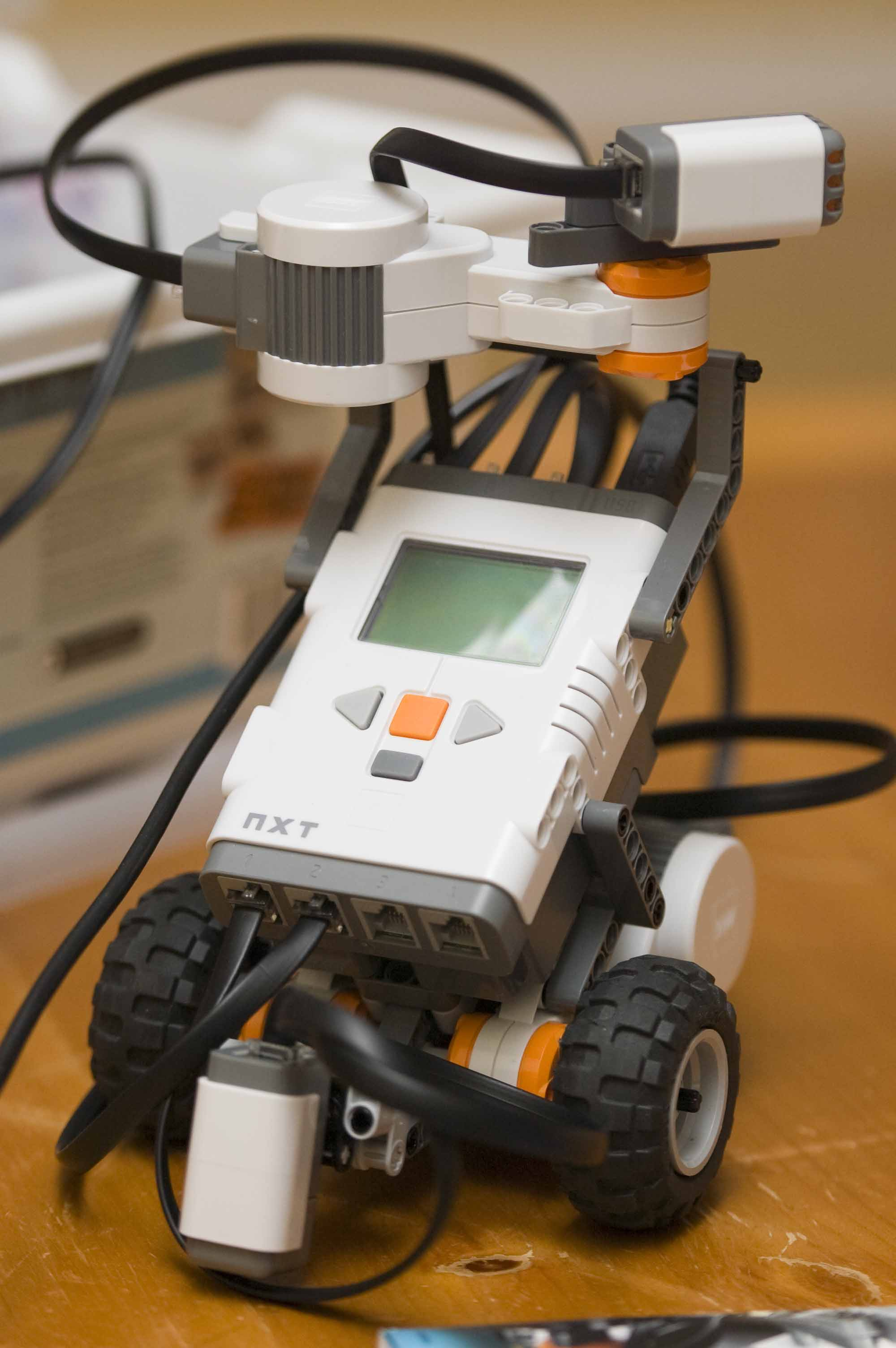
- Robot based on the NXT platform
- Subject: Robotics
- Availability: 1 September 1998–31 December 2022
- Total sets: 91
- Official website

Lego Mindstorms (sometimes stylized as LEGO MINDSTORMS) is a discontinued line of educational kits for building programmable robots based on Lego bricks. It was introduced on 1 September 1998 and discontinued on 31 December 2022.

Mindstorms kits allow users to build creations that interact with the physical world. All Mindstorms kits consist of a selection of Lego Elements, a "Smart Brick" (internally known as a programmable brick or "pbrick"), which serves as the "brain" for a Mindstorms machine. Each set also includes a few attachments for the smart brick (such as motors and sensors) and programming software. Unlike conventional Lego sets, Mindstorms kits do not have a main model to build. Sample builds are included with each version of Mindstorms, but the kit is open-ended with the intent of the user creating and programming their own designs.

In addition to at-home use, Mindstorms products are popularly used in schools and in robotics competitions such as the FIRST Lego League Challenge. Versions of Mindstorms kits specifically intended for use in educational settings are sold by Lego Education.

Children are the intended audience of Lego Mindstorms, but a significant number of Mindstorms hobbyists are adults. The latter have developed many alternative programming languages and operating systems for the smart brick, allowing for more complex functions.

While originally conceptualized and launched as a tool to support educational constructivism, Mindstorms has become the first home robotics kit available to a wide audience. It has developed a community of adult hobbyists and hackers as well as students and general Lego enthusiasts following the product's launch in 1998. In October 2022, the Lego Group announced that it would discontinue the Lego Mindstorms line while continuing to support the Scratch-based SPIKE controller.

== Lego Mindstorms and Robotics Invention System (1998) ==
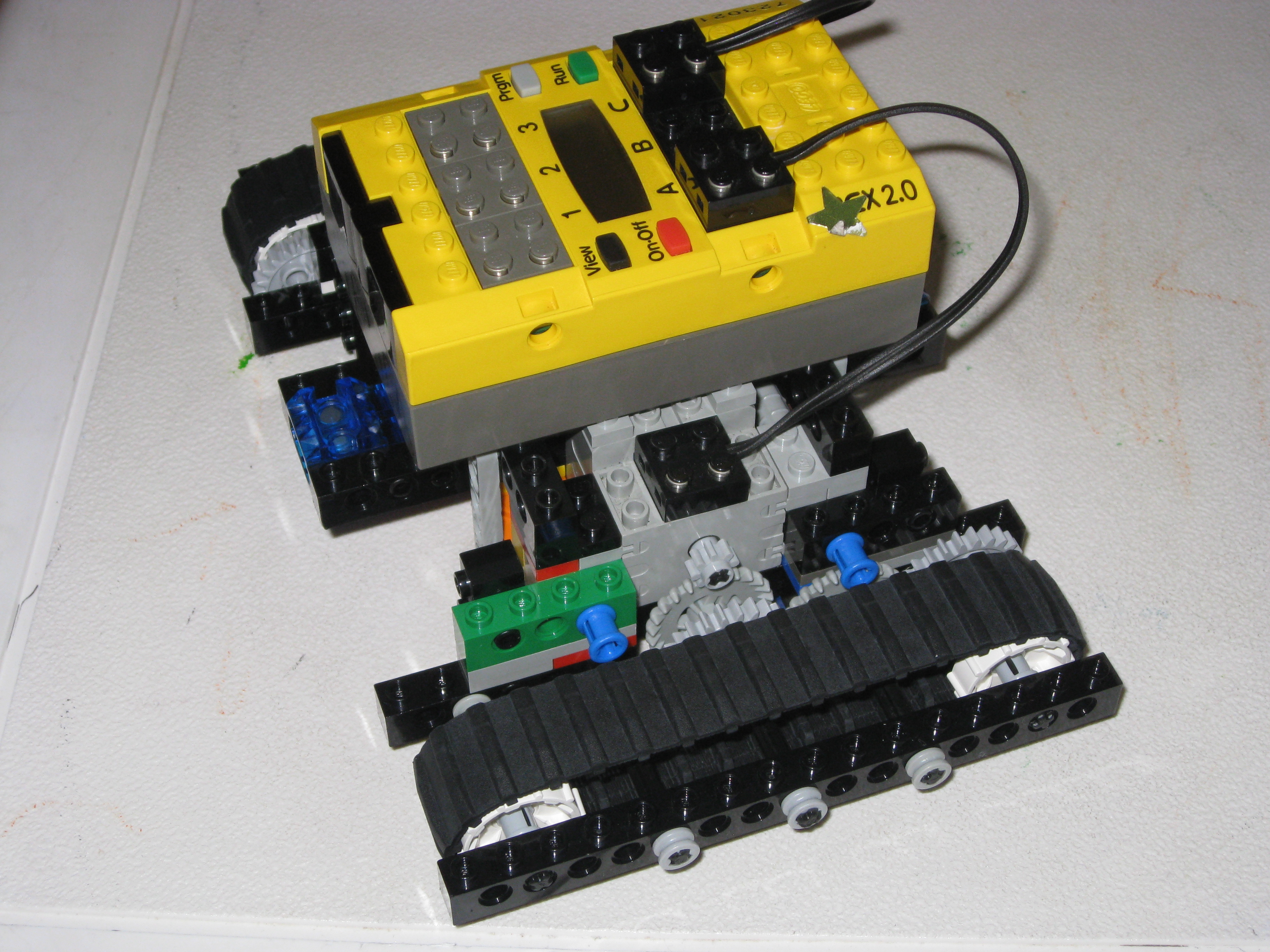
A robot created using Robotics Invention System parts

The Robotics Invention System (RIS) was the flagship product of the first generation of the Lego Mindstorms line. It is a commercialization of technology produced by the MIT Media Lab in collaboration with the LEGO group. The RIS featured the programmable Robotic Command eXplorer (RCX) microcontroller, as well as 9V Lego-compatible motors and sensors and a selection of Lego parts. The original RIS was launched fall of 1998. It was replaced by a second version, RIS 1.5, in the summer of 1999; and a third version, RIS 2.0, in 2001.

=== Development of Mindstorms Brand ===
The Lego Mindstorms product line was the first project of "Home Education", a division of Lego Education established by employee Tormod Askildsen in 1995. Askildsen, who had previously spent ten years working for Lego Education, had grown frustrated working with teaching professionals and wanted to create an improved educational experience that was delivered directly towards children. Home Education decided to incorporate technology into their products based on market research that concluded that children found learning that involved technology interesting. Lego Mindstorms started development in April 1996. The concept for the set was based on technology created in partnership with the MIT Media Lab. MIT Media Lab had been experimenting with combining Lego and programming since the early 1980s, and Lego had previously commercialized some of this technology as classroom products in the Lego Dacta line. The programmable brick (or pbrick) was a refinement of these early concepts, which had limited range because they had to be tethered to a computer to run.

Lego had been interested in mass-producing the pbrick since its creation in the 1980s, but at the time it was considered infeasible due to the lack of computers in schools and households and the relative expense of electrical components. in the early 1990s, technology began to become more present in children's lives, and the toy market accordingly began shifting more towards computerised toys. Many of Lego's attempts at producing electronic toys had languished at the point that Lego began developing MIT's programmable brick into a consumer product. MIT continued developing the pbrick concept, creating a "Red Brick" version between 1994 and 1996 that improved the previous version. By the mid-1990s, personal computers were becoming relatively common in households and the components required to produce the pbrick went down in price, making mass production feasible. Development on what would later be known as the Robotics Invention System started in 1996 as the flagship product of the newly created home-learning division of Lego Education (Lego Dacta). The product line's name "Mindstorms" was intended to express the user experience of the product, it is named after Papert's book Mindstorms, as the user experience was similar to the educational constructivism concepts described in his book.

The project's initial low profile allowed the Mindstorms team the freedom to develop the product using operating procedures then-unorthodox to the Lego Group. Unlike traditional Lego sets, the Mindstorms Robotics Invention System did not come with step-by-step instructions. The kit also did not have a main model, nor was the play driven by storytelling. To bridge the gap between this new play experience and pre-existing Lego ones, the Mindstorms team created a lot of opportunities for users to engage with each other, such as the creation of Mindstorms.com, Mindstorms Discovery Centers, and the FIRST Lego League Challenge. The creation of these experiences was done through partnerships with external groups that the Mindstorms team interacted with as equal partners, something that was uncommon for the Lego group at the time. To ease tensions between Mindstorms and more conventional products, the project team was given autonomy from Lego's product development process and instead reported directly to the company's senior management.

=== Development of RCX Brick ===
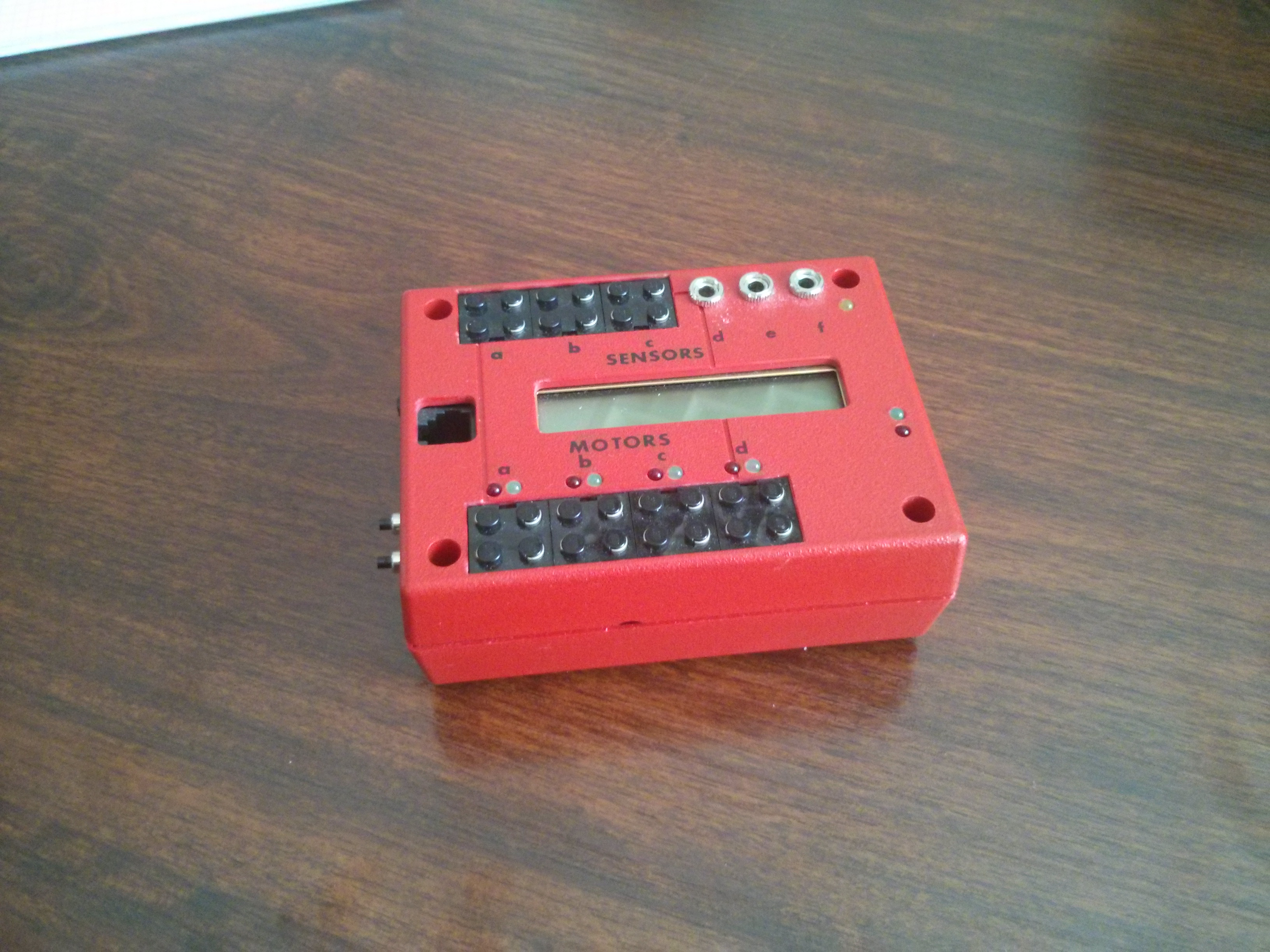
MIT Media Lab's "Red Brick" served as the prototype for Lego Mindstorms' RCX.

The Lego Mindstorms team used the insights that MIT researchers discovered from testing the 3rd Generation Logo Brick ("Red Brick") in schools as the basis for the development of the mass-produced programmable brick. The physical programmable brick was re-engineered from the ground up, as the experimental programmable bricks were not designed for robustness or cost-effective manufacturing. The programming language of the product was developed with help from members of the MIT Media lab. Lego decided to use a visual programming language for Mindstorms, inspired by the LOGOBlocks language previously used with programmable brick experiments, in order to make the product accessible to children who might be unfamiliar with programming. While the technology that Mindstorms was based on was aimed towards "all children", the chosen target demographic of Lego Mindstorms was intentionally narrow, in order to garner positive press by outselling expectations. The decision was made to aim the product towards 10 to 14-year-old boys, partly because it was Lego's main target demographic, and partly based on market research (not substantiated by the findings of the MIT Media Lab) which concluded that this demographic would be most attracted to computerized toys. This choice of target demographic directly informed the color of the RCX brick (which was made yellow and black to resemble construction equipment) and the sample uses for the Mindstorms kit (such as making autonomous robots).

=== Launch ===
Promotion of the Lego Mindstorms Robotics Invention System began 6 months before the product was planned to launch. The product was first soft launched with the opening of the Mindstorms Discovery Center at the Museum of Science and Industry, where children could interact with the Mindstorms Robotics Invention System to complete set tasks, getting them familiar with the product. The Mindstorms product was launched concurrently with the Cybermaster, another Lego product spun off from the MIT programmable brick technology that was more in line with the traditional product philosophies of the Lego group.

The Lego Mindstorms Robotics Invention System (RIS) was released September 1998 at a retail price of $199. Instead of being sold at toy stores, the product was sold at electronics stores like Best Buy and CompUSA, due to the relatively high cost of the set. The entire production run (of between 60,000 and 100,000 units) sold out within 3 months.

The second edition of the RIS, Robotics Invention System 1.5, was released in the summer of 1999, with a third edition, RIS 2.0, launched in 2001.

=== Fanbase and "Right-to-Hack" ===
Despite being aimed towards children, the Robotics Invention System quickly found an audience with adults and hackers of all ages; Lego company surveys conducted a few months after launch determined that seventy percent of Lego Mindstorms Hobbyists were adults. Shortly following the product's launch, adult hobbyists began sharing reverse-engineered versions of the RCX brick's Microcode and Firmware on the internet, leading to the development of alternative programming languages for the RCX such as "Not Quite C" (NQC) and alternative operating systems for the brick like lejOS. The Lego Group briefly considered sending cease-and-desist letters to websites sharing the RCX's proprietary code. However, The Mindstorms team successfully argued that the embrace of the product by the hacking community proved that the product was worth developing. In order to foster this burgeoning community, an official forum was established on the Lego website and a "right to hack" clause was added to end user license agreement of the Lego Mindstorms software. An official software developers kit for the RCX would later be released on the Mindstorms website. A number of products focusing on the RIS were released by adult hobbyists, including how-to books, and unofficial sensors and hardware. A convention for Lego Mindstorms hobbyists, named Mindfest, started in 1999.

Despite strong sales, the Mindstorms development team was neglected by upper management. As a cost-cutting measure, the Mindstorms office was shut down in 2001, and team members were laid-off or assigned to other projects. The Lego Group continued to produce the Robotics Invention System 2.0, selling around 40,000 units per year without advertising until the set was discontinued in 2006.

== RCX ==
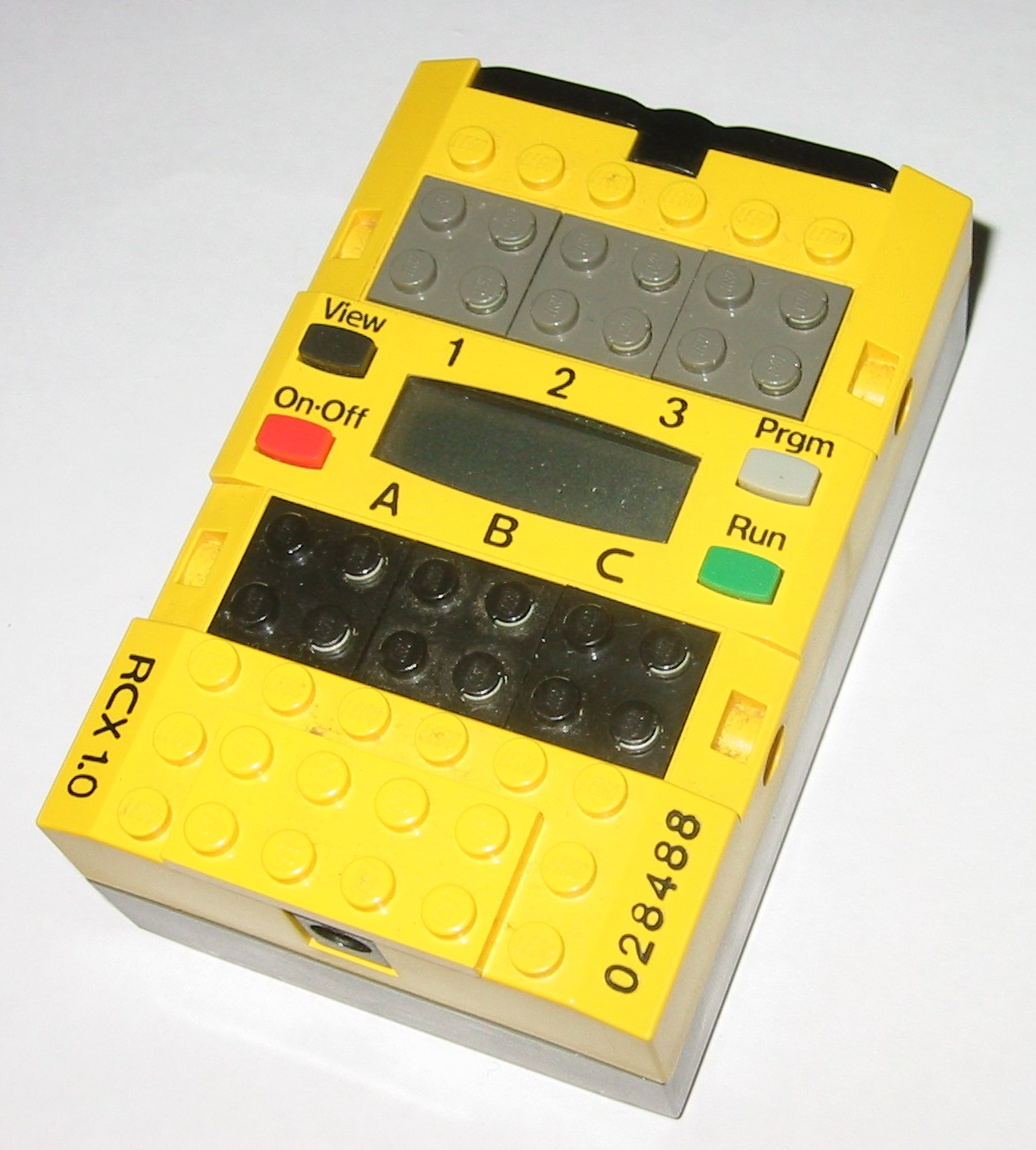
First-generation RCX programmable brick

The RCX is based on the 8-bit Renesas H8/300 microcontroller, including 32 kB of ROM for low-level IO functions, along with 32 kB of RAM to store high-level firmware and user programs. The RCX is programmed by uploading a program using a dedicated infrared interface. After the user uploads a program, the RCX can run it on its own without the need for computer access. Programs may make use of three sensor input ports and three 9 V output ports, in addition to the IR interface, enabling RCX bricks to communicate with one another. A built-in LCD can display information including the battery level, the status of the input/output ports, and the program currently running.

Version 1.0 RCX bricks feature a power adapter jack in addition to batteries. In version 2.0 (as well as later 1.0s included in the RIS 1.5), the power adapter jack was removed. Power adapter-equipped RCX bricks were popular for stationary robotics projects (such as robot arms) or for controlling Lego model trains. In the latter context, the RCX might be programmed with Digital Command Control (DCC) software to operate multiple wired trains.

The IR interface on the RCX is able to communicate with Spybots, Scout Bricks, Lego Trains, and the NXT (using a third-party infrared link sensor). The RCX 1.0 IR receiver carrier frequency is 38.5 kHz, while the RCX 2.0 IR carrier frequency is 76 kHz. Both versions can transmit on either frequency. The RCX communicates with a computer using a Serial or USB IR tower. As the RCX is discontinued, support for the interface is limited on more recent operating systems than Windows XP.

All RCX versions have a unique number printed on them, which could be registered on the now-defunct Lego Mindstorms RCX website. This was necessary to obtain technical support. The first RCX produced is marked "000001," and was on display at the Mindstorms 10th Anniversary event.

The Lego RCX was available in new sets from 1998 (Lego Set 9719: Robotics Invention System 1.0) through 2003 (Lego Set 9786: Robo Technology Set, with USB cable). The original RCX 1.0 worked with existing Lego power supply products from the Lego Train theme, Lego Product 70931: Electric Train Speed Regulator 9 V Power Adaptor for 120 V 60 Hz - US version (Years: 1991-2004), Lego Product 70938: Electric Train Speed Regulator 9 V Power Adaptor for 230 V 50 Hz - European version (Years: 1991-1996). Both of these products converted wall power to 12VAC, through a coaxial power connector (also called a "barrel connector"), 5.5 mm outside, 2.1 mm inside. These were sometimes sold alone and sometimes available as part of other sets such as Lego Set 4563: Load N' Haul Railroad (Year: 1991) and Lego Set 10132: Motorized Hogwarts Express (Year: 2004).

== Robotics Discovery Set, Droid Developer Kit, and Dark Side Developer Kit ==
The Robotics Discovery Set was a more affordable and simpler package than the Robotics Invention Set. Instead of being based on the RCX, it had its own programmable brick called the Scout. An even simpler version of the Scout would be featured in two Star Wars-themed Mindstorms sets.

=== Scout ===
Lego also released a blue computer called the Scout, which has 2 sensor ports, 2 motor ports (plus one extra if linked with a Micro Scout using a fiber-optic cable), and a built-in light sensor, but no PC interface. It comes with the Robotics Discovery Set. The Scout can be programmed from a collection of built-in program combinations. In order to program the Scout, a user must enable "power mode" on it. The Scout can store one program.

The Scout is based on a Toshiba microcontroller with 32 KB of ROM and 1 KB of RAM, where about 400 bytes are available for user programs. Due to the extremely limited amount of RAM, many predefined subroutines were provided in ROM. The Scout only supports passive external sensors, which means that only touch, temperature and other unpowered sensors can be used. The analog-to-digital converters used in the Scout only have a resolution of 8 bits, in contrast to the 10-bit converters of the RCX.

There was a plan for Lego to create a booster set that allows programming the Scout from a computer with software such as RCX code. However, due to the complexity of this project, it was abandoned.

The RCX can control the Scout brick using the "Send IR Message" program block. The RCX does all of the controlling, and therefore can be programmed with the PC, while the Scout accepts commands. The Scout brick must have all of its options set to "off" during this process.

=== Micro Scout ===
The Micro Scout was added as an entry-level to Lego robotics. It is a very limited Pbrick with a single built-in light sensor and a single built-in motor. It has seven built-in programs and can be controlled by a Scout, Spybotics or RCX unit using VLL. Like the Scout, the Micro Scout is also based on a microcontroller from Toshiba.

The unit was sold as part of the Droid Developer Kit (featuring R2-D2) and later the Dark Side Developer Kit (featuring an AT-AT Imperial Walker).

== Lego Mindstorms NXT (2006) ==
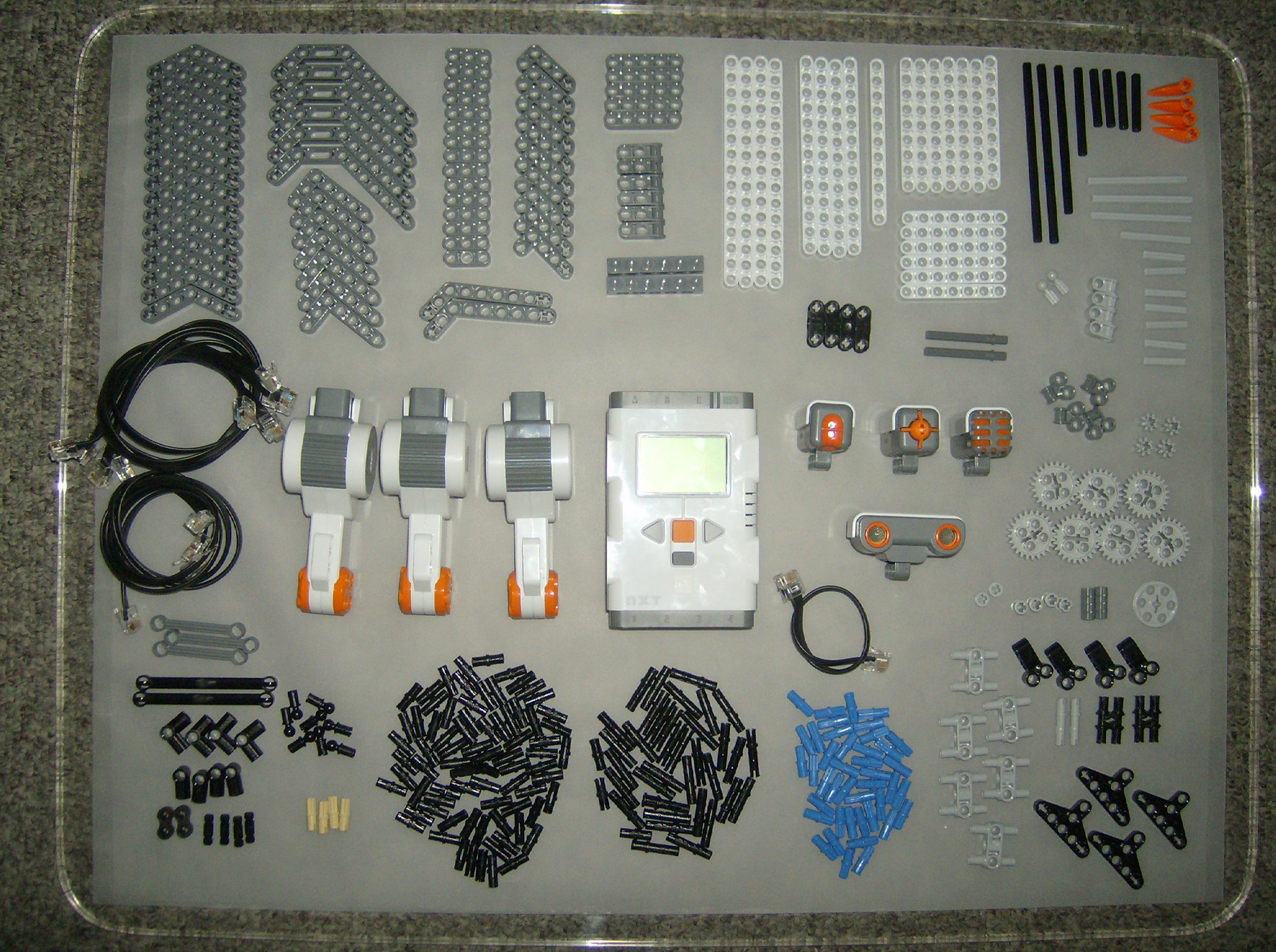
Lego Mindstorms NXT Kit

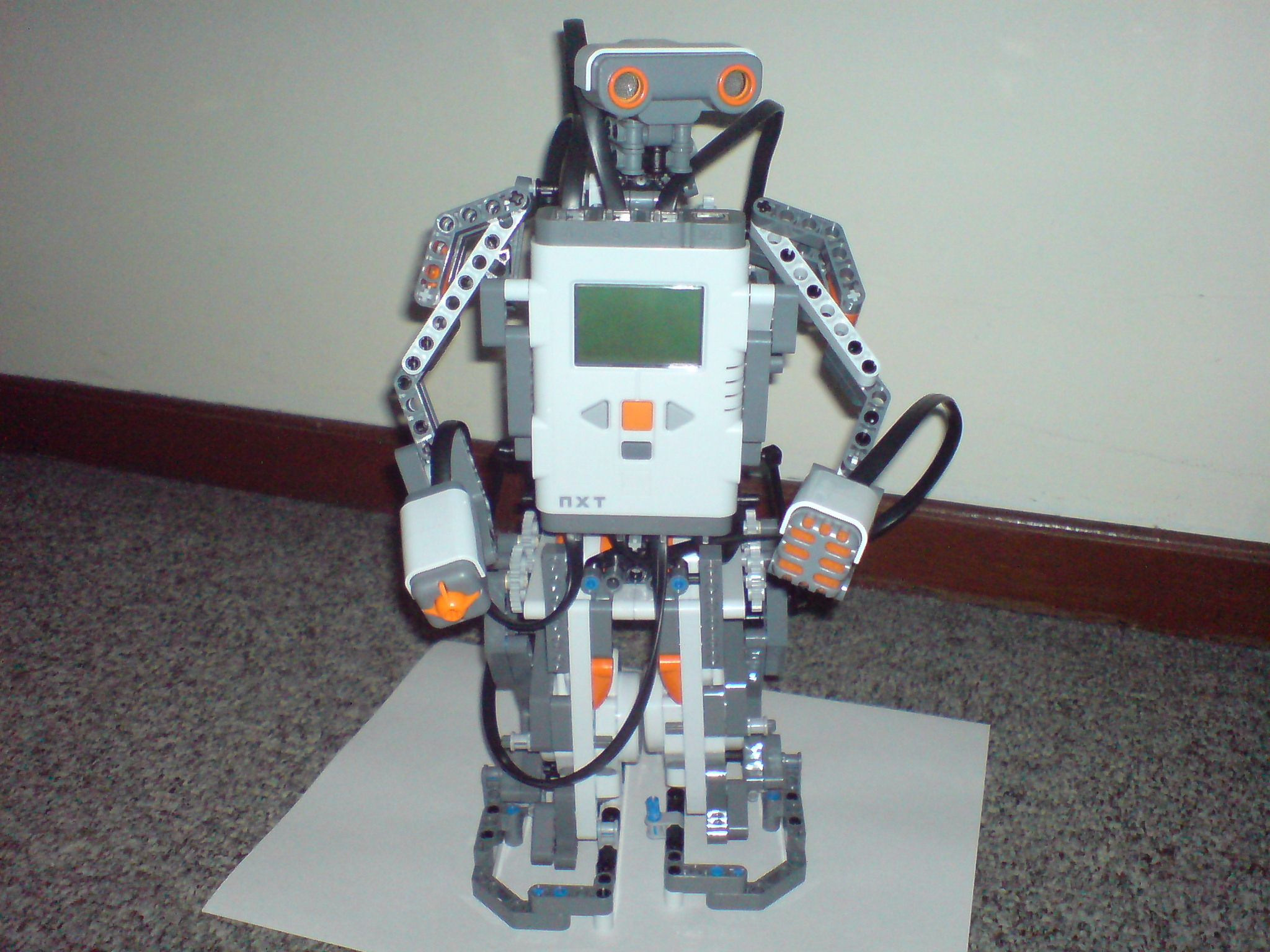
Robot built from the kit

Lego Mindstorms NXT was a programmable robotics kit released by Lego in August 2006, replacing the first-generation Lego Mindstorms kit.

The kit consists of 577 pieces, including: 3 servo motors, 4 sensors (ultrasonic, sound, touch, and light), 7 connection cables, a USB interface cable, and the NXT Intelligent Brick. It lets the robot autonomously perform different operations. The kit also includes NXT-G, a graphical programming environment that enables the creation and downloading of programs to the NXT. The software also has instructions for 4 robots: Alpha-Rex (a humanoid), Tri-Bot (a car), Robo-Arm T-56 (a robotic arm), and Spike (a scorpion)

=== Development ===
The Development of Lego Mindstorms NXT began in 2004. At the time, The Lego group was in the middle of a financial crisis. As part of the turn-around effort, the product line developed for release in 2006 would feature relatively few products that were guaranteed to be profitable. A revival of The Mindstorms Robotics Invention System was chosen as of these products, as Lego Mindstorms had a strong fan following and kits continued to sell well without advertising.

Fans were extensively involved in the development and promotion of Mindstorms NXT. The development team collaborated with four hobbyists considered experts in Lego Mindstorms fan community. These fans were collectively known as the Mindstorms Users Panel (MUP). They were shipped early prototypes of the Mindstorms kit and communicated to Mindstorms team members on a private internet forum. MUP gave extensive feedback on the hardware and design of the NXT kit. Features of NXT directly based on requests of the MUP include the use 32-bit processor, more powerful motors, and Bluetooth compatibility.

=== Launch ===
Promotion of Lego Mindstorms NXT was largely word-of-mouth based, because the company was in the middle of a financial crisis and did not have enough money for a large marketing campaign. Mindstorms NXT was unveiled in January 2006 at the 2006 Consumer Electronics Show. At the show, Lego requested applications for a beta-testing phase, where 100 users, known as Mindstoms Community Partners (MCP)s would receive NXT kits at a discounted price months before launch. The intention of the MCP program was to build support for the product prior to launch, and receive feedback on the near-final kit. Fans involved in the MCP program provided a significant amount of PR for the set upon launch, such as alternate models, finished book drafts, and web content like blog posts. News outlets like Wired and CNN also provided free publicity for Mindstorms NXT by reporting on the inclusion of fans in its development process. The launch of Mindstorms NXT, measured in airtime hours, web content and magazine pages; generated more public interest than the entire company had previously accumulated in its entire lifetime.

Lego Mindstorms NXT (Product no. 8527) was released August 1 of 2006. $30 million worth of kits were sold in the first year.

== Lego Mindstorms NXT 2.0 ==
The Lego Mindstorms NXT 2.0 (product no. 8547) was launched on 5 August 2009. It contains 619 pieces and four sensors; two touch sensors, a new light sensor that added a color sensor, and an ultrasonic distance sensor. The NXT 2.0 uses Floating Point operations whereas earlier versions use Integer operation. The kit costs around US$280.

== Lego Mindstorms EV3 ==
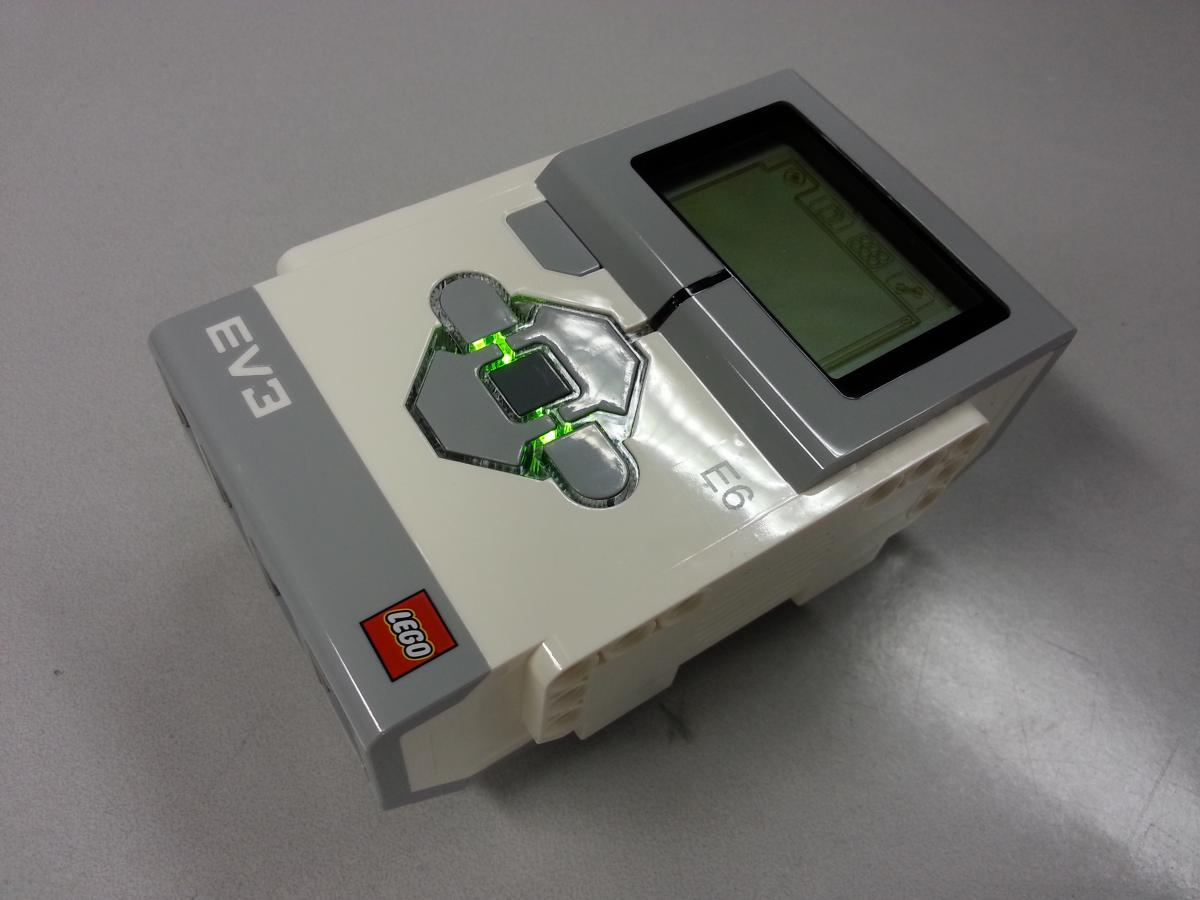
Brick of Lego Mindstorms EV3

EV3, the third generation Mindstorms product, is a further development of the NXT. The system was released on 1 September 2013. There are three versions of the Lego Mindstorms EV3:

- LEGO MINDSTORMS EV3 31313

This set contains 601 pieces and includes 3 servo motors (2 large and 1 medium), 3 sensors (touch sensor, infrared sensor and colour sensor), the EV3 programmable brick and a remote control (the Infrared Beacon, which is only on Home/Retail mode).

- LEGO MINDSTORMS Education EV3 Core Set 45544

This version contains 541 pieces and always includes 3 servo motors (2 large and 1 medium), 4 sensors (2 touch sensors, ultrasonic sensor, colour sensor and gyro sensor) and the EV3 programmable brick.

- LEGO MINDSTORMS Education EV3 Expansion Set 45560

This set instead contains 853 Lego Technic elements

The EV3 can be controlled by smart-devices. It can boot an alternative operating system from a microSD card, which makes it possible to run ev3dev, a Debian-based operating system.

== Lego Education Spike Prime ==
Spike Prime was announced in April 2019. While not being part of the Mindstorms product line, the basic set includes three motors (1 large 2 medium) and sensors for distance, force and color a controller brick based on an STM32F413 microcontroller and 520+ Lego Technic elements. Majority of these motors and sensors, including the hub, would serve as the electric components for the then-upcoming Robot Inventor set.

== Lego Mindstorms Robot Inventor ==
Lego Mindstorms Robot Inventor was announced in June 2020 and released later in autumn. It is the last commercially available Mindstorms set before the discontinuation of the theme announced in October 2022. It has four medium motors from Spike Prime, two sensors (distance sensor and color/light sensor) also from Spike Prime, a Spike Prime hub with a six-axis gyroscope, an accelerometer, and support for controllers and phone control. It also has 902+ Lego Technic elements. This set was discontinued in 2022 with Lego promising app support through 2024

== Programming languages ==
Name	Device			Program type		Language type(s)	Notes	Links
Name	RCX	NXT	EV3	Runs on Brick	Remote control	Language type(s)	Notes	Links
Actor-Lab						Custom flowchart-like language		
Ada		Yes				Ada	Requires nxtOSEK	
Ada Interface to Mindstorms						Ada		
App Inventor		Yes				App Inventor	Specific support for Lego Mindstorms NXT sensors and motors	
brickOS	Yes	No	No			C, C++		website
Ch						C, C++ interpreter	Control Lego Mindstorms in C/C++ interactively without compiling	
clang						C, C++		
CoderZ			Yes	Yes	No	Java	Works with Blockly or with Java (using LejOS). Also includes an online 3D simulator	website
Cpp4Robots	No	No	Yes	Yes		C/C++	Cpp4Robots is extension (plug-in) for Microsoft Visual Studio development environment; allows programming Lego EV3 in native C/C++ language and in Visual Studio; works with default firmware in EV3 Brick	website
DialogOS						Graphical flowchart for voice controlled robots	DialogOS combines speech recognition and speech synthesis with robotics, enabling building talking robots that react to voice commands	
Enchanting		Yes				Drag and drop, similar to NXT-G	Program robots simply by dragging the line of functions	
EV3Basic	No	No	Yes	Yes	Yes	Microsoft Small Basic		website Archived 22 September 2017 at the Wayback Machine
ev3_scratch			Yes	No	Yes	Scratch (programming language)	Code runs in the browser relaying commands to EV3 robot over Bluetooth	
FLL NXT Navigation		Yes				Uses NXT-G and .txt files		
GNU Compiler Collection (GCC)						C, C++, Objective-C, Fortran, Java, Ada, others		
Gnikrap	No	No	Yes	Yes	Yes	JavaScript, Scratch-like programming		website
GNU Toolchain for h8300						C, C++, Assembly language (ASM)		
HVM			Yes			Development environment for the Java language for the Mindstorms EV3, Eclipse-based	Works with Java 1.7; works with standard Lego firmware; needs no microSD card; needs a wireless bluetooth dongle for the EV3	website
Interactive C						C-style language	Language developed for the MIT Lego Robot Design Contest	
jaraco.nxt		Yes			Yes	Python	Python modules providing low-level interfaces for controlling a Lego NXT brick via Bluetooth; includes code to control motors with an Xbox 360 controller using pyglet	
LabVIEW		Yes	Yes	Yes	Yes	National Instruments LabVIEW visual programming language (G code)	Core language used to develop Mindstorms NXT software, and is language for EV3; available add-on kit can be used to create and download programs to NXT and create original NXT blocks or control robots directly via USB or Bluetooth using NXT fantom.dll	
Lego Mindstorms EV3 API for .NET	No	No	Yes	No	Yes	.NET, WinJS and C++	.NET API for the Lego Mindstorms EV3 brick, usable from desktop, Windows Phone, and WinRT; can connect, control, and read sensor data from Lego EV3 bricks over Bluetooth, Wi-Fi, or USB	website Archived 22 September 2017 at the Wayback Machine
Lego.NET						Anything that can compile to CIL, works best with C#	Includes no compiler, converts CIL to machine code	
Lego::NXT		Yes		No	Yes	Perl	Set of Perl modules providing real-time computing low-level control of a Lego NXT brick over Bluetooth	
LegoLog						Prolog	Uses an NQC program to interpret commands send from the PC running the Prolog code	
LegoNXTRemote		Yes		No	Yes	Objective-C	Remote control program for remotely operating and programming a Lego NXT Brick. Supports NXT 2.0 and 1.0, sensors, all 3 motors, automatic "steering" control, and running preloaded programs.	
leJOS	Yes	Yes	Yes	Yes	Yes	Java	A java based system for advanced programmers can handle most sensors and things like GPS, speech recognition and mapping technology. Can be interfaced with the Eclipse IDE or run from the command line	
Lestat						C++	Allows controlling the NXT directly from any C++ program in Linux	
librcx						C/C++	Library for GNU Compiler Collection (GCC)	
Logitech SDK						Visual Basic, Visual C++	Can be combined with an RCX control library such as spirit.ocx from the MindStorms SDK to make use of the Lego Cam	
Microsoft Visual Programming Language (VPL)		Yes		No	Yes	Graphical flowchart, based on .NET	With the Microsoft Robotics Studio, it uses a native NXT program msrs to send and receive messages to and from a controlling program on a computer via Bluetooth	
Mindstorms SDK						Visual Basic, Visual C++, MindScript, LASM	Does not need VB to use the VB features as MS Office comes with a cut down version of VB to make macros	
Monobrick			Yes	Yes	Yes	C#	.NET 4.5. Firmware running from SD card.	website
NQC	Yes			Yes		NQC, a C-like language		
NXT++						C++	Allows controlling the NXT directly from any C++ program, in Visual Studio, Windows.	
NXT_Python		Yes		No	Yes	Python	Package to control a Lego NXT robot using Python language; can communicate via USB or Bluetooth	
NXT-Python		Yes		No	Yes	Python	Based on NXT_Python, includes added advanced features, support for around 30 sensors, and multiple brick connection backends. Works on Windows, Linux, Mac.	
NXTGCC						Assembly, C, makefiles, Eclipse, etc.	The first GCC toolchain for programming the Lego Mindstorms NXT firmware.	
nxtOSEK						C, C++		
OCaml-mindstorm						OCaml	Module to control Lego NXT robots using OCaml through the Bluetooth and USB interfaces.	
OnScreen						A custom language which can be programmed directly on the RCX		
pbForth	Yes					Forth	Discontinued	
pbLua		Yes				API for the Lua language for the Mindstorms NXT, text-based	pBLua: ... is written in portable C, with minimal runtime requirements; can be compiled on the fly on NXT; is a small, easy to read, and easy to write language; has extensive documentation available online and in dead-tree format, and a very friendly newsgroup	website
PBrickDev						PBrickDev, a flowchart based language	Has more function than the RIS language, such as datalogs and subroutines, multithreading	
PRO-BOT						A kind of Visual Basic/spirit.ocx-based language	Designed for robots which are in contact with the workstation at all times	
Processing		Yes				Java (simplified, programmed C-style)	Processing is an open source language and environment to program images, animation, and interactions. It is used by students, artists, designers, researchers, and hobbyists for learning, prototyping, and production; the NXTComm Processing library developed by Jorge Cardoso can control the NXT with Processing	
QuiteC						C	Library for use with GNU Compiler Collection, comes with GCC for Windows	
RCX Code	Yes					RCX Code, a custom flowchart-based language	Included in the Mindstorms consumer version sold at toystore	
ROBOLAB	Yes					A flowchart language based on LabVIEW	This is the programming environment offered to schools who use MindStorms, supports the Lego Cam. The programming structure simulates a flowchart design structure almost icon by icon. Therefore, it helps users a great deal in terms of translating from a flowchart design to Robolab icons.	
RoboMind						Simple educational scripting language available from Arabic to Ukrainian.	The RoboMind learning environment allows to quickly develop and test scripts for a virtual robot environment. The scripts can then directly be transferred to a Lego Mindstorms NXT robot. It works on the standard firmware.	
RoboRealm						A multi-platform language that works with IRobot Roomba, NXT, RCX, VEX, and many other popular robotic sets; can also process video using a webcam, this gives a robot excellent vision since it can filter out certain colors, lock-on to a certain area of color, display variables from the robot or computer, and much more; software works with keyboard, joystick, mouse		
Robot JavaScript		No	Yes	Yes	Yes	JavaScript	A compiler that compiles JavaScript code for EV3 robots. Includes syntax highlighting, code sharing, over 100 example programs, and verbose compiler messages. Object oriented language. Free.	website
ROBOTC	Yes	Yes	Yes	Yes		Integrated development environment for students, used to program and control Lego NXT, VEX, RCX and Arduino robots using a language based on C language	ROBOTC gives ability to use a text-based language based on C language; includes built-in debugger tools, (but not limited to) code templates, math/trigonometry operations (sin, cos, tan, asin, acos... etc.), user-friendly auto-complete function built into the interface, built-in sample programs. This deserves a special note for its debugging tool; a good debugging tool is very important; of robotics programming languages which support Mindstorms platform, RobotC's debugging environment is noteworthy, but is not free	
Robotics.NXT		Yes			Yes	Haskell	Haskell interface over Bluetooth; supports direct commands, messages, and many sensors (also unofficial), and a simple message-based control of a NXT brick via remotely executed program (basic NXC code included)	
Robot Operating System (ROS)						A Linux based library for writing robots; the stack nxt provides interface with the NXT		
ruby-nxt		Yes			Yes	Ruby	Provides low-level access to the NXT via Bluetooth and some preliminary high-level function	
RWTH – Mindstorms NXT Toolbox		Yes			Yes	MATLAB	Interface to control the NXT from MATLAB via Bluetooth or USB; open-source	
Simulink (Lego Mindstorms NXT Support)		Yes				Simulink	Provides a one-click rapid application development (RAD) tool for the NXT; C code is automatically generated from a graphical Simulink model; code is then deployed and downloaded onto the NXT, from where it can be run; the Mathworks provides an array of graphical blocks that represent various sensors and actuators that the NXT uses	
SqLego						Squeak		
Swift, Robotary			Yes	Yes		Swift	Robotary is a Mac robotics studio that uses the Swift language	website Archived 13 September 2016 at the Wayback Machine
TclRCX	Yes					Tcl		
Terrapin Logo						Logo		
TinySoar						Soar	An implementation of the Soar artificial intelligence architecture that runs on the RCX brick; Soar incorporates acting, planning, and learning in a rule-based framework	
TinyVM	Yes					Java	A predecessor to the lejos language. An open source Java based replacement firmware for the Lego Mindstorms RCX microcontroller.	
Transterpreter (The)						Occam		
TuxMinds						(Linux) GUI for various distributions, an open source IDE based on Qt. Supports a lot of bots. RCX, NXT and Asuro are predefined.	With the XML-based configuration file almost any kind of bot (or microcontroller) can be added. Own equipment can be added in the same manner.	
URBI by Gostai for Lego Mindstorms NXT						URBI, C++, Java, Matlab	Easy to use parallel and event-driven script language with a component architecture and opensource interfaces to many programming languages. It also offers voice/speech recognition/synthesis, face recognition/detection, Simultaneous localization and mapping, etc.	
Vision Command	Yes					RCX Code	Official language for use with the Lego Cam, allows control of robots with color, motion, and light flashes	
XS						Lisp		

== Use in education ==
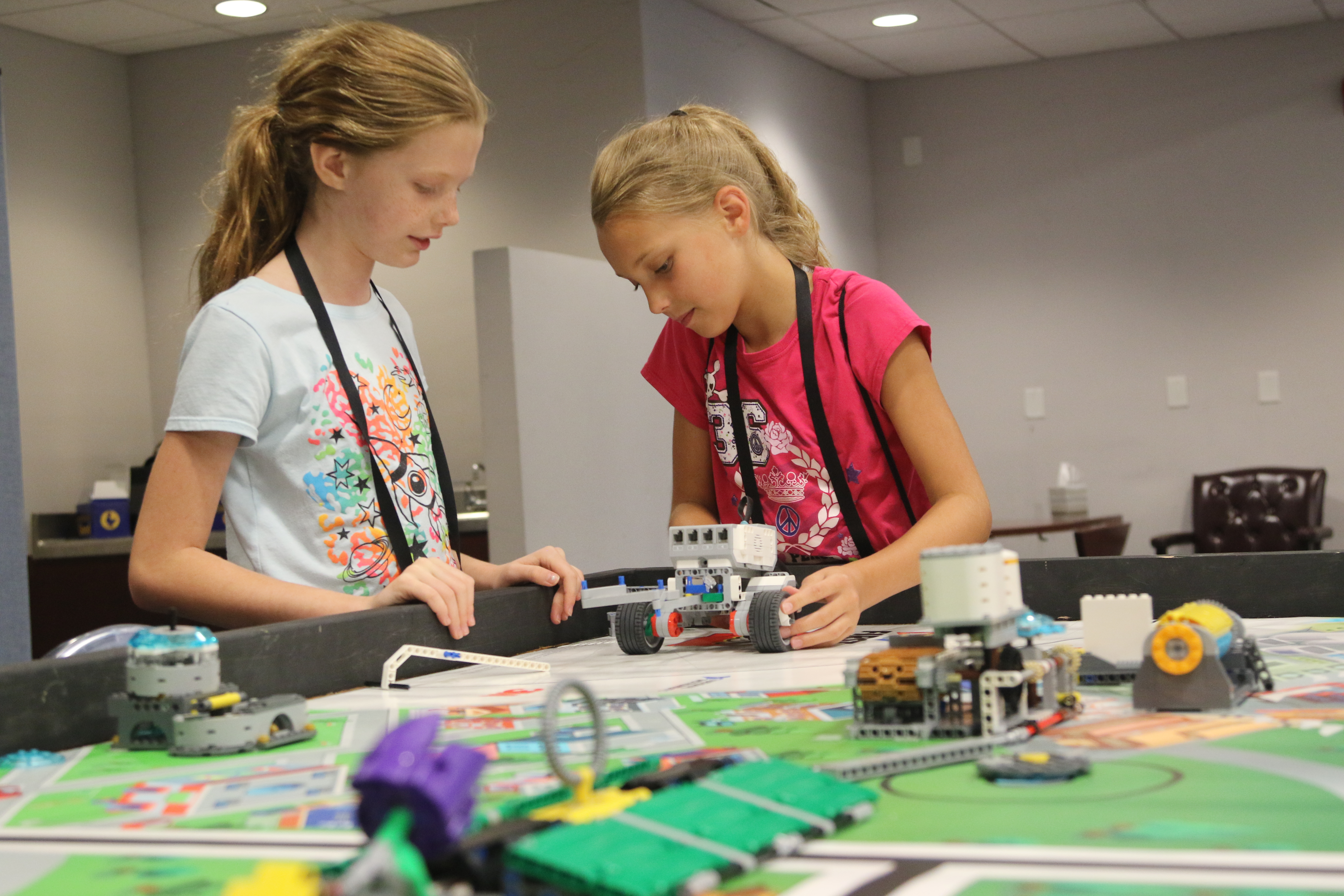
A Mindstorms EV3 robot is used to navigate a First Lego League (FLL) course as part of a summer camp.

Mindstorms kits are also sold and used as an educational tool, originally through a partnership between Lego and the MIT Media Laboratory. The educational version of the products is called Mindstorms for Schools or Mindstorms Education, and later versions come with the ROBOLAB GUI-based programming software, developed at Tufts University using the National Instruments LabVIEW as an engine.

== Use in competition ==
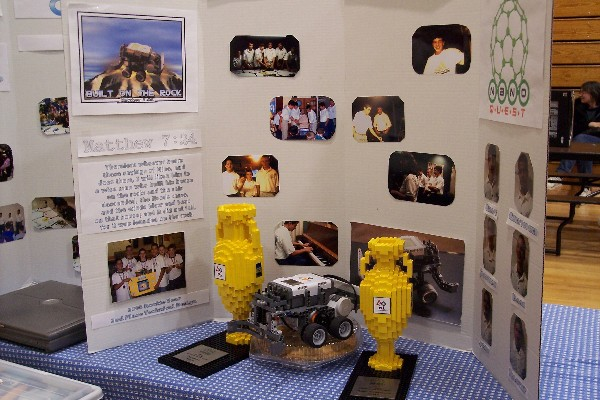
A poster presentation from First Lego League (FLL)

Due to its user friendliness towards children, Lego Mindstorms has been used as a platform for several child-oriented robotics competitions, most prominently the FIRST Lego League Challenge, but also World Robot Olympiad or Robocup Junior

FIRST Lego League Challenge (founded as FIRST Lego League) is a robotics competition that uses Lego Mindstorms products. (Note: Lego Education's SPIKE sets are also allowed. SPIKE is the only brand of robotics kits sold by Lego following the discontinuation of the Mindstorms Brand in 2022; but any generation of Lego Mindstorms can be used in FLL.) It was founded in 1998 concurrent with the launch of LEGO Mindstorms and continues to exist to this day. It is a collaboration between FIRST and The Lego Group to involve a lower age bracket than the FIRST Robotics Competition. FLL teams consist of children between the ages of 9 and 14, and an adult coach.

== See also ==
- FIRST Lego League Challenge
- World Robot Olympiad (WRO)
- Robofest
- FIRST Tech Challenge
- RoboCup Junior
- Lego Education (WeDo 2.0)
- Big Trak
- iRobot Create
- Robotis Bioloid
- The Robotic Workshop
- Robotics suite
- C-STEM Studio
- Botball
- CubeStormer II
- Cubestormer 3
- Arduino
- DIY Kindle Scanner
