= Mindstorms (book) =

1980 book by Seymour Papert

Mindstorms: Children, Computers, and Powerful Ideas
- First edition
- Author: Seymour Papert
- Language: English
- Series: Harvester Studies in Cognitive Science
- Release number: 14
- Subject: Computer literacy
- Published: 1980 (Harvester Press)
- Publication place: United Kingdom
- Media type: Print
- Pages: 238
- ISBN: 978-0-85527-163-3
- OCLC: 83827854

Mindstorms: Children, Computers, and Powerful Ideas is a book by computer scientist Seymour Papert, in which he argues for the benefits of teaching computer literacy in primary and secondary education. It was published by Basic Books in 1980, and republished in a new edition by Basic Books in 1993.

The Lego Mindstorms programmable construction set system is named after the book.

In 2017, thanks to Papert's family, the book was made freely available online here.

Papert describes the Turtle as an "object-to-think-with" and discusses many code examples of Turtle Graphics.
