= Capsela =

Construction toy

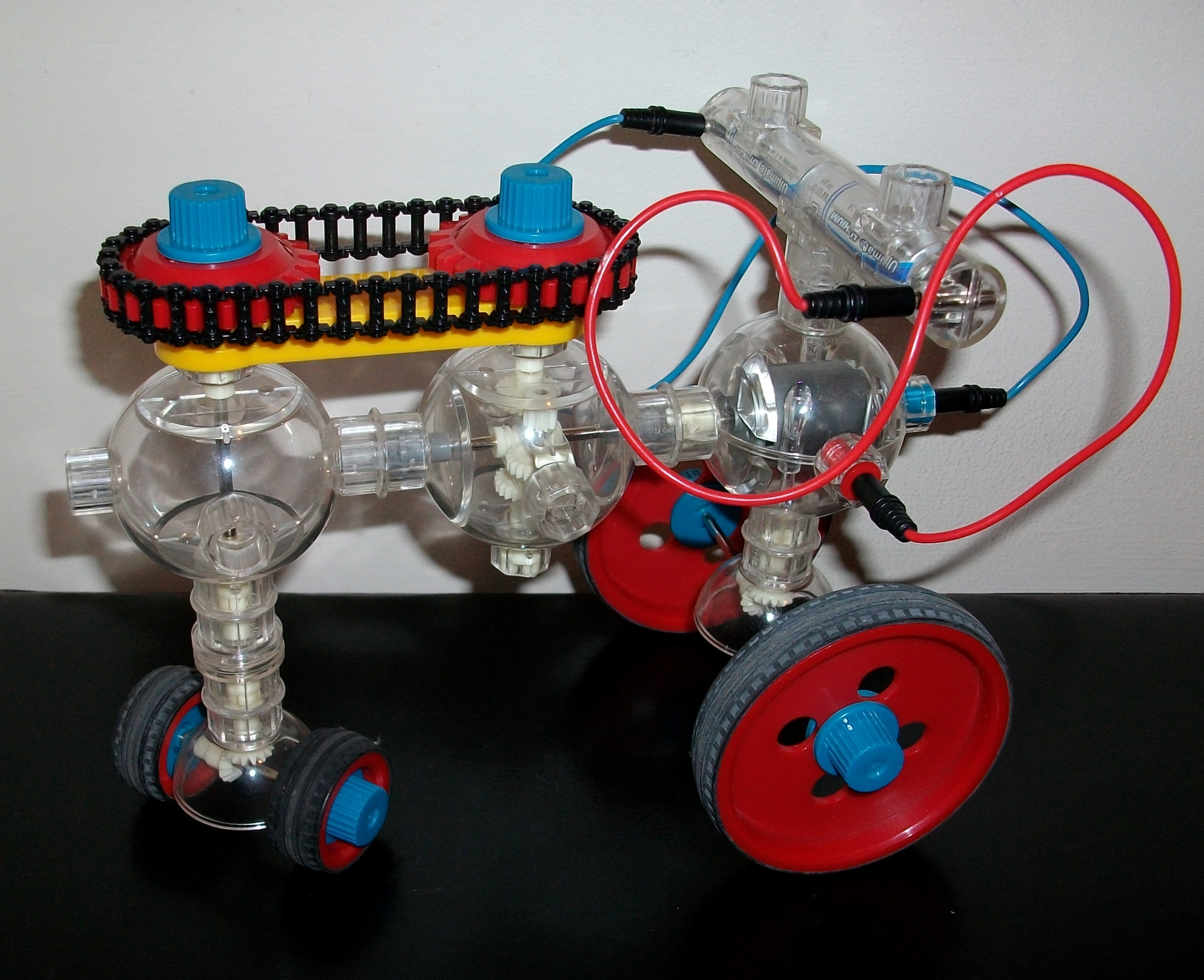
This model, created with the Capsela 250 Science Discovery Kit, has a swivel above the small wheels that allows it to sometimes turn itself around after running into an obstacle.

Capsela is a construction toy brand consisting primarily of gears and motors in spherical plastic capsules that can be connected to form various static or dynamic toys suitable for land or water. The capsules typically have six hollow octagonal connectors protruding, where an octagonal sleeve piece bridges between two capsules. The hollow connection pegs on a capsule can have electrical or rotary adapters inside, reaching into the next capsule. There are electric motor capsules, gear capsules, switch capsules, pontoon capsules, and others; there are also battery holders, wheels, propellers, impellers, lights, wires, and miscellaneous supporting pieces.

Capsela products were originally manufactured by the Mitsubishi Pencil Company. The series was then licensed out to Play Jour and has since been produced by VTech, Kidology, and other subsidiaries. The range was re-released in Japan by Bandai, adding new colors to the basic range of transparent spheres. In the U.S., the Capsela line was purchased by Educational Insights, a manufacturer of learning toys and educational materials for school classroom, which has discontinued the line.

== Product line ==
Capsela products were originally sold in at least four ranges:

- A series of increasingly complex generic construction sets, similar in style to Meccano or Lego Technic. (Sets 135, 150, 200, 250, 400, 450, 500, 700 and 1000, ranging from 30 to 108 parts.)
- Capsela Computer, the flagship range, based around a multi-function computer capsule capable of controlling motors and lights. Sets CRC2000 and ICR5000, the latter featuring an infrared remote control.
- Capsela Voice Command systems (3000 and 6000) have a small computer capable of responding to a number of voice commands. The 6000 system has a rudimentary wireless infrared remote control.
- A sister product branded as SpaceLink, has no motorized parts (with the exception of spring powered wheel units) and instead focuses on science fiction-themed accessories (cockpits, small action figures, rockets, etc.). This range appears to have been designed to be more appealing to children than the more educational original products. This includes sets 330, 345, 360, 610, 650, 670, 690, 805, 820, 835, 850, 860 and 895, ranging from 8 to 53 parts.
- Capsela Powertram, a series designed to bridge Capsela and Spacelink, containing motor-driven construction components and Spacelink accessories. The Powertram unit is a motor-driven platform which houses its own batteries and allows land vehicles to be constructed without the need for a separate switch box, battery compartments, wires and motors. This includes sets 275 and 375, with 26 and 42 parts, respectively.
- Robot (set 204) – this set comes with a worm gear capsule with a larger gear ratio.

== Robotic Workshop ==
In January 1987, Access Software announced The Robotic Workshop, a kit designed for home computers that used a range of Capsela parts. The kit includes more than 50 Capsela parts, including two motors, gears, wheels, and sensors. The kit also includes an electronic control unit that plugs into the user port of a Commodore 64, an instruction manual with 50 tutorial projects, and special programming software on a floppy disk. It was later released for Apple, Atari, and IBM computers.

== Use in schools ==
Capsela has been used in school science technology classes, and to promote technical careers in engineering, robotics, and mechatronics to younger high school students, sometimes specifically targeting girls.

== Reception ==
Games magazine included Capsela 700 Series in their top 100 games two years in a row. For their "Top 100 Games of 1980", one of their editors described it as "just the best construction set he's ever played with." In the "Top 100 Games of 1981", they praised it as a "construction set that is more than child's play" and noting that "The transparent parts make it easy to learn about motors, gear ratios, and transmission of energy."
