= Lego clone =

Children's Lego-style construction blocks

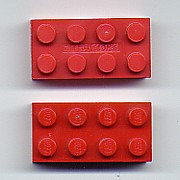
Mega Bloks building block (above) and Lego building brick (below)

A Lego clone is a line or brand of children's construction blocks which is mechanically compatible with Lego brand blocks, but is produced by another manufacturer. The blocks were originally patented by The Lego Group in 1961 as "toy building bricks", and the company has since remained dominant in this market. Some competitors have moved to take advantage of Lego brand recognition by advertising their own products as compatible with Lego, with statements such as "compatible with leading building bricks".

The last underlying patents of the brick design expired in 1978, opening the field to rivals.

At least two of the largest clone manufacturers have been challenged in court by Lego. The lawsuits have been mostly unsuccessful, for courts have generally found the functional design of the basic brick to be a matter of patent rather than trademark law, and all relevant Lego patents have expired.

== Legal challenges ==
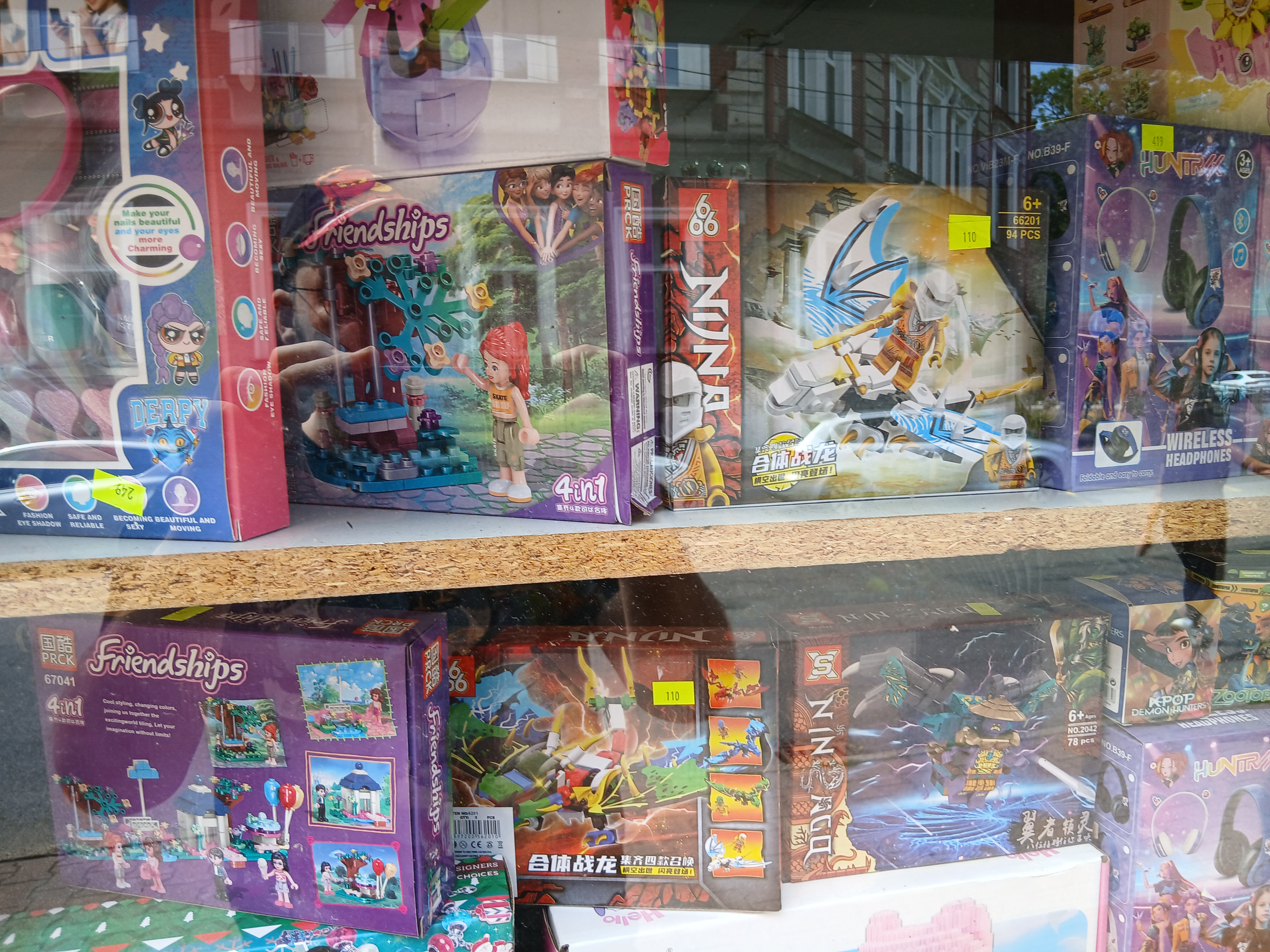
Chinese Lego knockoffs, mimicking major Lego brands, in a Vietnamese-run souvenir shop in Czech Cieszyn

Although Lego itself originally copied its bricks from British psychologist and inventor Hilary Page in the late 1940s, the company has sued others whom it perceived as producing overly similar products. Lego claims that, when contacted by Lego in the late 1950s, Kiddicraft gave no objection to the Danish company manufacturing the bricks; Lego eventually purchased the rights to the Kiddicraft bricks and trademark from the descendants of Page in 1981.

Lego and Tyco Industries fought in US courts over Tyco's line of interlocking bricks in the 1980s with Tyco prevailing. On August 31, 1987, the US District Court ruled that Tyco could continue making Super Blocks, its Lego clone bricks, but ordered Tyco to stop using the Lego trademark and not to state that they were "Lego, but only cheaper". In Lego's Hong Kong suit against Tyco Super Blocks, Lego received an injunction forcing Tyco to stop cloning Lego bricks designed after 1973. Tyco was also being sued at the time by Lego in Austria, Italy and Canada.

In the 1990s, Lego sued the Canadian company Mega Bloks on the grounds that its use of the "studs and tubes" interlocking brick system was a violation of trademarks held by Lego. On November 17, 2005, the Supreme Court of Canada upheld Mega Bloks' right to continue selling the product in Canada. A similar decision was reached by the European Union's Court of First Instance on November 12, 2008, upholding an EU regulatory agency's reversal of opinion following an objection by Mega Bloks against a trademark awarded to Lego in 1999. Mega Bloks won a case at the EU's top court in 2010 against Lego's trademark registration of a red toy building brick. On September 14, 2010, the European Court of Justice ruled that the 8-peg design of the original Lego brick "merely performs a technical function [and] cannot be registered as a trademark."

Also in the 1990s, Korean company Oxford was sued by The Lego Group over similar designs, but the case was eventually ruled in Oxford's favor.

Between 1998–2001, Lego sued Polish company Cobi S.A. However, their final case in 2001 was dismissed in the Polish court, especially after it was proven that Cobi's bricks were entirely original and not direct copies of Lego bricks.

The Lego Group did score a success in 2002, when its Swiss subsidiary Interlego AG sued the Tianjin CoCo Toy Co., Ltd. company for copyright infringement. A claims court found many CoCo sets to be infringing; CoCo was ordered to cease manufacture of the infringing sets, publish a formal apology in the Beijing Daily, and pay a small fee in damages to Interlego. On appeal, the Beijing High People's Court upheld the trial court's ruling.

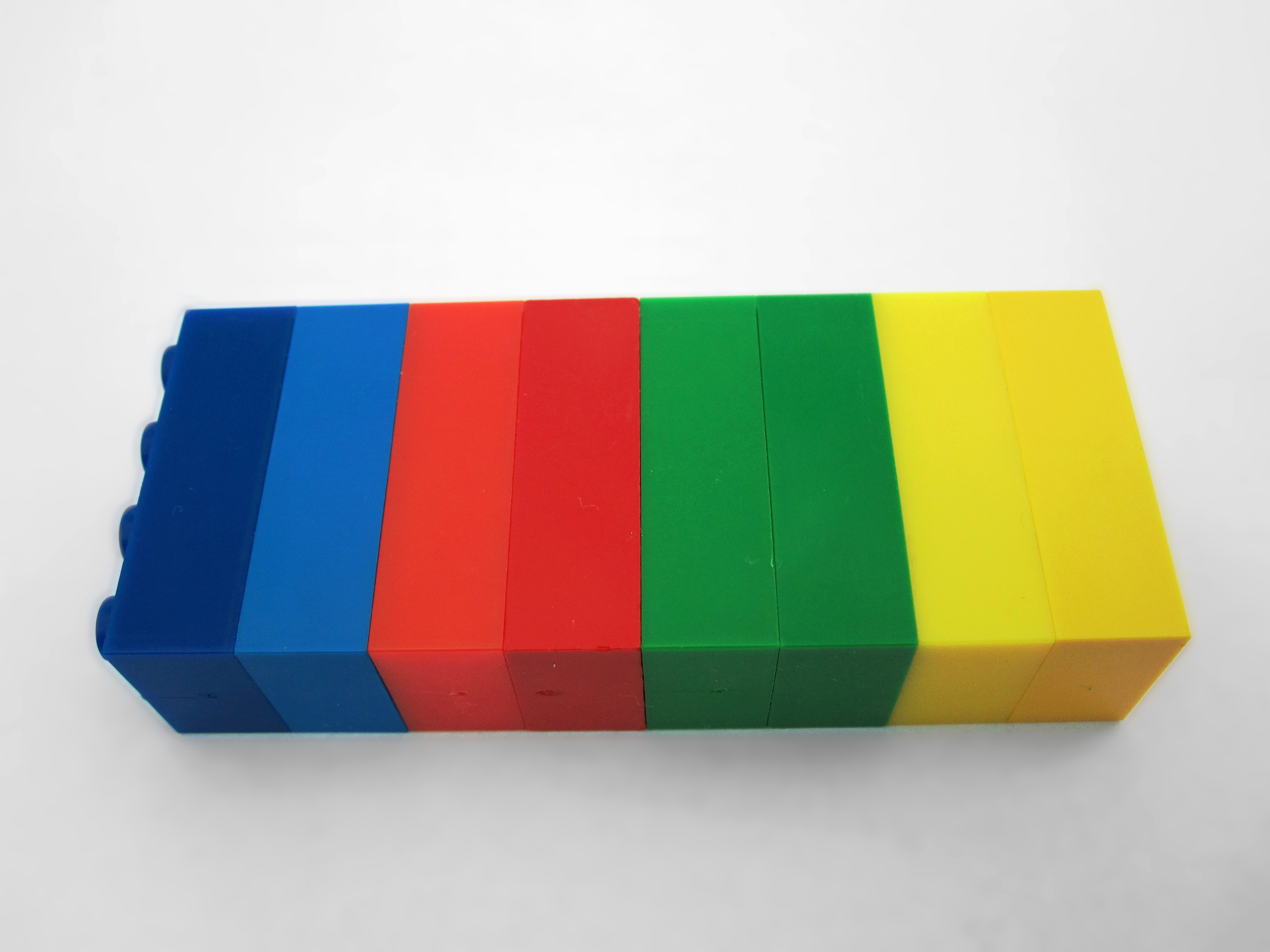
Best-Lock bricks can be connected to Lego bricks. These bricks alternate Best-Lock then Lego in pairs, from left to right.

The English company Best-Lock Construction Toys sued Lego in German courts in 2004 and 2009. The German Federal Court denied Lego trademark protection for the shape of its bricks in the latter case.

In 2000, Lego filed a three-dimensional trademark for its mini-figures, which Best Lock had duplicated since 1998. In 2012, Best Lock sued to get the trademark revoked. On June 16, 2015, European Court of Justice upheld Lego's figure trademark. Lego had in 2009 filed its copyright claims into a U.S. Customs database that led to the seizure of Best-Lock shipments coming in from Asia. In October 2011, Lego filed in US District Court in Hartford filed against Best-Lock over the mini-figure trademark.

In 2011, Lego sued Guangdong Jumbo Grand Plastic Moulding Industrial over its BanBao brand's similar packaging. The two companies settled their case out of court with Guangdong agreeing to create unique packaging and a new figure design. In 2016, Lego announced that it would be taking legal action against the Chinese company Guangdong Loongon, which manufactures the brand Lepin, for selling exact replicas of existing Lego products (including box-art). In 2019, Lego sued Lakeshore Learning Materials for violating its minifigure trademark. In 2020, Lego was successful in blocking Zuru from selling its own version of minifigures, the court finding that Zuru infringed upon Lego's trademark. In 2021, the Guangdong High Court handed down a judgment ordering Guangdong Meizhi and three other defendants (the originators of the LEPIN clone trademark) to pay CN¥ 30,000,000 (US$4.56 million) in punitive damages for trademark infringement and unfair competition.

== Brands ==
The following brands have been described as "Lego clones":

Name	Years active	Manufacturer	Ref.
ATC	1970s	Asahi Toy Company, from Japan	
Anko (also known as Construction: Blocks)	2019–present	Kmart Australia	
BanBao	2010–present	Guangdong Jumbo Grand Plastic Moulding Industrial Co., Ltd.	
Bikku	2018–present	Keak Japan Co., Ltd.	
BlueBrixx	2018–present	BB Services GmbH	
Built to Rule	2003–2005	Hasbro	
Best-Lock	1997–present	Best-Lock Group	
CaDA	2007–present	Double Eagle Toys Industry Co. Ltd.	
Cobi	1995–present	Best-Lock Group	
CoCo		Tianjin COCO Toy Co., Ltd.	
Cogo		Guangdong Loongon	
Jiestar			
JMBricklayer		JMBricklayer	
Kre-O	2011–2017	Hasbro	
Lakeshore Learning Company			
Laser Pegs		Laser Pegs Ventures	
Lepin		Guangdong Loongon	
Ligao (立高)	1999–	Wange Toys Industrial Company	
Linoos			
Lite Brix	2013–	Cra-Z-Art (LaRose Industries)	
LumiBricks (formerly FunWhole, "FO")			
Make-it Blocks		proprietary brand of Dollar Tree	
Mattel Brick Shop	2025–present	Mattel	
Mega Bloks	1991–present	Mega Brands (Mattel)	
Mega Construx		Mega Brands (Mattel)	
Mirabloco	1980s	CMiranda scholar equipment, from Portugal	
Mould King	2012–present	Mould King	
Nifeliz	2020–present	Nifeliz	
N&B Block	1968–1972	Nintendo	
Oxford	1996–	Oxford	
Pantasy	2020–present	Pantasy	
Pop Blocks		Pop Mart	
Qman (formerly Enlighten)	1994–present	Guangdong Qman Industry Toys Co., Ltd.	
Reobrix		Shantou Juhang Toy Technology Co., Ltd.	
Sembo Block			
Sluban	2004–present	Sluban	
Tyco Super Blocks	1984–1990	Tyco Toys/Mattel	
Wilko Blox		Wilko	
Xingbao	2016	subsidiary of Lepin, Guangdong Loongon	
Zuru MAX (Build More)		Zuru	

- K'Nex sets have included compatible bricks since 2008.
- Ramagon, by Discovery Toys, has some panels with compatible studs

== See also ==
- Interlego AG v Tyco Industries Inc
- Free Universal Construction Kit – 3D-printable open source construction toy
