= Oxford (toy company) =

South Korean toy company

Oxford Co., Ltd.
- Formerly: Dongjin Ind. Corp.
- Industry: Toys
- Founded: 1961; 65 years ago
- Headquarters: Busan, South Korea
- Products: Construction set
- Website: oxfordtoy.co.kr

Oxford Co., Ltd. (Korean: 옥스포드) is a South Korean toy company, based in Busan, that makes interlocking brick toys. It was founded in 1961 as Dongjin Industries Corp. and has used its current name since 1992.

The company toys are colloquially called "Korean Lego", as they use the same underlying principles and are intercompatible. They often feature themes of "war and danger" and include sets such as military vehicles. The company also releases many promotional sets in collaboration with various companies.

== History ==
The company was founded in 1961 as Dongjin Ind. Corp.

The toy sales company was renamed Daegoo Lucky Toy Corp. in 1971, followed by Busan Lucky Toy Corp. in 1972, and then PAPA toy Industries Corp in 1984.

In 1992, PAPA was renamed Oxford Co., Ltd. and began producing brick toys. In the 1990s, Oxford was sued by The Lego Group over similar designs, but the case was eventually ruled in Oxford's favor.

In the mid-2000s, Oxford claimed that it had a higher market share of the Korean brick toys market than Lego, a claim the LEGO company disputed. Oxford's success was attributed to cheaper price and focus on the infant market. In the mid-2010s, Oxford products accounted for about 15% of the Korean brick toys market and they have been called "a major player in South Korean toy industry".

== Products ==
The company makes blocks in larger sizes for younger children and smaller ones for older children. The company's blocks are compatible with Lego brand bricks.

Oxford manufactures Kre-O bricks on behalf of Hasbro.

== Themes and characteristics ==
Unlike the internationally known Lego sets, Oxford sets contain themes such as military or related to specific (mostly Korean) history. The exotic themes of Oxford sets, as well as their perceived value and quality, have made them popular in the Lego fandom, and they are sometimes referred to as "Korean Lego".

A few hundred different sets have been released, most targeted at children aged 5 to 12. The company produces small block sets in several themes.

Its generic themes include military, transport, town, fire, police and spy themes. Military sets include those of modern equipment used by South Korean Army (e.g. the KF-21 fighter jet). There is also a generic pink-colored theme marketed at girls (called "Sweet").

It also has several themes related to Korean history and cultural heritage sets: Ancient Three Kingdoms with a focus on the Gwanggaeto the Great era, 16th-century Japanese invasions of Korea, modern 19th-century era as well as sets representing events in modern 20th- and 21st-century Korean history. Specific sets include events and items such as a Korean turtle ship, the Namdaemun historical gate, the assassination of Itō Hirobumi, the K-pop band BTS, and the Joint Security Area in the Korean DMZ. Sets related to American military and the Korean War have also been manufactured in toy form, such as the Sherman tank or the USS Missouri battleship.

The company also has a wide array of often licensed themed sets related to Korean films, dramas, and TV shows (Infinite Challenge, Joint Security Area, Kingdom, Mr. Sunshine, Real Man), or Korean or international companies and franchises (e.g. 7-Eleven, Disney, Doraemon, Gaspard and Lisa, Gwangju FC, Hancom, Hello Kitty, Hyundai Department Store, Jeju International Airport, Kia Motors, Korail, Korean Air, Krispy Kreme, Kumho Tire, MapleStory, MBC TV, Miffy, Nongshim, Ocean World, Outback Steakhouse, Peter Rabbit, Pororo, Samsung, SM Entertainment, Thomas the Tank Engine). Some related sets contain product placements (for example, for the Kia Soul car or Korean Ediya Coffee shop chain). The Hasbro's Kre-O toyline, produced by Oxford, features content from franchises such as Transformers and G.I. Joe. Some sets from those series cannot be bought directly from Oxford company, as they are distributed as gifts or promotional products by companies ordering them.

Korean history motives portrayed in the Oxford sets are seen as in line with South Korean patriotic and nationalistic historiography, e.g. reinforcing the critical portrayal of Japanese as invaders (e.g. figurines representing Japanese warriors usually have "sinister facial expression"). The Korean-war themed Sherman tank set has also been described as having anti-American subtext (as the set contains not only the tank, but also Korean civilians and refugees, who are shown to be upset or angry when faced with the tank).

Another aspect that differentiates Oxford products (as of early 2020s) from more gender-conscious products by Lego and other similar companies (e.g. Playmobil) is the fact that they are often significantly focused on topics and characters of interest to boys. About half of the Oxford set themes have been described as "conflict toys" focusing on "war and danger" and are seen as marketed at boys. Less than 9% of Oxford minifigurines are female (even the "Sweet" series has only a rough parity in male and female minifigurines); and the female characters are often shown as having inferior social positions - victims, criminals, subordinates (e.g., secretaries or nurses) or are slotted into stereotypical female gender roles (princesses, consumers, housemakers). This has been explained in terms of significant levels of gender inequality present in the Korean society.

Oxford mini figurines have also been considered to display "orientalist and racialist stereotype," with Western characters being "pinkish" and Asians more "yellowish" in color. They have also been criticized for xenophobic attitudes, with criminal minifigurines implied to be Westerners or ethnic minorities (e.g., Chinese Koreans).

Benjamin Joinau critically observed that Oxford sets "foster a structured ideological narrative which is globally conservative and even nationalist, mirroring a strong anti-Japanese agenda with occasional stances on American and Western powers as well as a diffuse xenophobic orientation" and that they "reproduce Korean mainstream gender politics by producing gender stereotypical scripts which not only assign and reinforce traditional gender roles, but also constrain little girls to subaltern positions". Joinau has also expressed surprise that there are many themes that are not covered by Oxford sets or are covered very poorly, such as topics related to modern Korean culture (Korean food) or Korean traditional culture (most of the buildings seen in the modern sets are generic Western, not traditional Korean). Very few sets are concerned with topics of science or education.

== See also ==
- Cobi (building blocks)
- Mega Brands
