= Built to Rule =

Building blocks toyline

Built to Rule was a building block toyline that was released by Hasbro from 2003 to 2005. The sets included blocks that are compatible with other toy block brands as Lego. These sets were usually based upon existing toys and characters from the Hasbro brand, such as Tonka, G.I. Joe and Transformers: Armada.

== G.I. Joe ==
Built To Rule was marketed as "Action Building Sets". All sets came with one set of building blocks you could build into a full sized vehicle, and one specially designed 3 3/4 G.I. Joe figure. The forearms and the calves of the figures sport places where blocks could be attached.

=== 2003 ===
The 2003 Built To Rule followed the G.I. Joe: Spy Troops story line.

- Armadillo Assault with Duke
- Depth Ray with Wet Suit
- Forest Fox with Frostbite
- Locust with Hollow Point
- Raging Typhoon with Blowtorch
- Rock Crusher with Gung-Ho
- Cobra Moccasin with Cobra Moray
- Cobra Raven with Wild Weasel

=== 2004 ===
Some of the figures in 2004 featured additional articulation with a mid-thigh cut joint.

- Ground Striker with Flint
- Patriot Grizzly with Hi-Tech
- Rapid Runner with Chief Torpedo
- Rising Tide with Barrel Roll
- Sledgehammer with Heavy Duty
- Headquarters Attack with Snake Eyes - Includes Cobra Firebat with A.V.A.C.
- Cobra H.I.S.S. with Cobra Commander
- Cobra Night Prowler with Shadow Viper
- Cobra Sand Snake with Firefly
- Cobra Venom Striker with Firefly

=== 2005 ===
- Freedom Defense Outpost with Duke

== Transformers ==
Transformers Built to Rule toys were predicted by some groups to be big sellers in 2003. A small number of Transformers: Energon Built to Rule sets had a limited, test market release, but the entire line performed poorly, so it was dropped in its entirety in 2004.

There are some significant differences between the Armada and Energon sets, though both are based on the same basic premise. Each Transformers kit is centered on a "Trans-Skeleton", a very simple humanoid body that folds up for vehicle mode without dis-assembly. From there, extra parts are added to the Trans-Skeleton for either mode. For Armada, the Trans-Skeleton was a very broad, flat solid plate with thin, stick-like limbs attached to it, which led to very awkward-looking robot modes. The structure of the Trans-Skeleton was changed for the Energon characters, to a much more solid skeleton with larger, blockier limbs. This led to much more solid, stable and sturdy-looking robot modes.

=== Transformers: Armada sets ===
- Demolishor & Blackout
- Demolishor & Blackout (Night Attack)
- Hot Shot & Jolt
- Jetfire & Comettor
- Megatron & Leader-1 (with Cyclonus & Crumplezone)
- Optimus Prime & Sparkplug
- Red Alert & Longarm
- Smokescreen & Liftor
- Starscream & Swindle
- Thundercracker & Zapmaster

=== Transformers: Energon sets ===
- Ironhide
- Optimus Prime
- Skyblast
- Inferno
- Starscream

== See also ==
- Kre-O – another Lego-compatible building block toy line introduced by Hasbro in 2011
- Lego clone
