= Transformers: Shattered Glass =

American comic book series

Transformers: Shattered Glass is a series of American comic books and prose stories published by Fun Publications published between 2008 and 2011, being based on the Transformers franchise by Hasbro. Two reboot series were published between 2021 and 2022 by IDW Publishing.

The main storyline is about a universe that is different from the official timeline, where the roles between Autobots and Decepticons as heroes and villains were switched.

== IDW Publishing series (2021–2022) ==
Transformers: Shattered Glass
- Cover A for Transformers: Shattered Glass issue #1

Publication information
- Publisher: IDW Publishing (licensed by Hasbro)
- Format: Limited series
- Genre: Action; Science fiction
- Publication date: Series 1: August 25 – December 22, 2021; Series 2: August 31 – December 14, 2022
- No. of issues: Series 1: 5; Series 2: 5

Creative team
- Written by: Danny Lore
- Pencillers: Andrew Lee Griffith; Guido Guidi; Dan Khanna; Marcelo Matere
- Inkers: Gigi Dutreix; Matt Froese; John Wycough
- Letterers: Lettersquids; Neil Uyetake
- Colorists: John-Paul Bove; Ed Pirrie
- Editors: Riley Farmer; David Mariotte

=== Development ===
==== Transformers: Shattered Glass (2021) ====
On April 9, 2021, during Hasbro Pulse Fan Fest 2021, IDW Publishing announced a five-issue comic book series based on the Transformers: Shattered Glass brand, with new toys based on Blurr, Megatron, Starscream, Goldbug and Jetfire. The series is written by Danny Lore, and was set for release on August 25, 2021.

Lore said, "As a writer, I love exploring characterization, what the core elements are that make someone who and what they are. Creating these Shattered Glass versions of childhood favorites is like building the perfect Combiner for me: what are the nuts and bolts that we can swap out while still making them recognizable?"

IDW editor Riley Farmer also said, "Our wonderful partners at Hasbro made a huge splash with their recent announcement of new Megatron and Blurr action figures packaged with our Shattered Glass comics, and we're proud to bring that story content -- and specifically three cover variants exclusively available to the comics retail channels -- to the wide audience of monthly comics readers".

The series concluded on December 22, 2021 after five issues.

==== Transformers: Shattered Glass II (2022) ====
In May 2022, IDW and Hasbro announced a sequel series titled Transformers: Shattered Glass II, set to be published in August 2022. The series features the return of most of the creative team of the previous series, with the addition of artist Marcelo Matere.

The series is one of the last projects presented by IDW before the publisher passes the Transformers comic book license back to Hasbro at the end of 2022.

Lore said, "it was a world full of passionate revolutionaries, terrifying warlords, and lots of big things going boom. The chance to revisit Shattered Glass, giving you even more of all that, really feels like coming home—a very explosive home with a lot of really tall folk, but home nonetheless!”

Khanna agreed that "it's great to return to the Shattered Glass universe where we continue to flesh out this whole new twisted mirror take on the normal Transformers universe. I think fans will really enjoy this latest chapter from this alternate reality."

Guidi said, "in the first miniseries, I really loved depicting Blurr as a bad guy and Jetfire's struggle for Starscream, playing with their facial expressions and their body language, yet keeping their basic traits from their original counterparts. But I can say that I'm having fun with any of the characters at this point. It's a really refreshing challenge to draw them as their opposite, yet make them convincing and natural in their new roles, for both new readers and older fans."

Matere also said, "after reading the script, one line helped to guide my art style for this book: a description of the Wreckers in a gangster or mobster scenario, calling for lots of shadows and black silhouettes of the characters, It's been great experimentation moving my art to this new level."

IDW editor Riley Farmer said, “it's so exciting to be bringing even more Shattered Glass characters to life. We always want to give the fans what they want, and when we can give them an awesome comic book series and provide backstory for amazing toys through our partnership with Hasbro…well, what could be better?”

The series concluded on December 14, 2022 after five issues.

=== Issues ===
Issue	Title	Written by	Drawn by	Colored by	Publication date
Shattered Glass (2021)
#1	"Shards: Part One"	Danny Lore	Guido Guidi; Inked by: John Wycough	John-Paul Bove and Ed Pirrie	August 25, 2021
In a parallel universe, the Autobots are tyrants that drove Cybertron and Earth into ruins. After most of the Decepticons are killed, Ratchet hires the bounty hunter Blurr to hunt down Starscream. While being chased by Chromedome and Hardhead, Starscream is saved by Blurr, who pretends to help him in order to capture him. After leaving the Gold City to the Static Zone's Chrome Ridge, Starscream manages to trick and injure Blurr enough to let him be surrounded by a volcano's lava. Starscream then continues his search for Megatron, the Decepticons' fallen leader.
#2	"Shards: Part Two"	Danny Lore	Dan Khanna	John-Paul Bove	September 29, 2021
While traveling to the Sea of Rust, Starscream finds Megatron, but he faints in the process, leading Megatron to take him to his shelter. During that time, the two discuss the past events that lead them to found the Decepticons: the satiety they felt after enduring the Autobots' abuse over them, as well as the torture they made on former Senator Shockwave. Megatron also remembers the many times Optimus Prime, the Autobots' leader, got him out of jail after several protests, hoping for him to join the Autobots, to no avail. Starscream asks Megatron to regain leadership, but the latter refuses, feeling guilty of the destruction that Optimus caused on Earth in his search for rare energon. After being left for dead, Megatron barely survives and repairs a ship to return to Cybertron. In spite of all these events, Starscream still believes in Megatron, as he also remembers the day he sacrificed himself against the Autobots so many Decepticons could depart from Earth in order to regroup. Now reunited, Starscream shows Megatron a way they could defeat the Autobots and liberate Cybertron and Earth, by awakening the Titans.
#3	"Shards: Part Three"	Danny Lore	Guido Guidi	John-Paul Bove	October 27, 2021
Starscream takes Megatron to the Decepticon Radio, a secret base within Gold City, where Soundwave tries to locate other Decepticons. Starscream remembers the time he and his former best friend Jetfire found the Titan Metroplex while being academic researchers. When Starscream joined the Decepticons, he cut ties with Jetfire and uploaded the communication code that he created on himself. Inside a bar, Megatron and Starscream have a fight with the party of Blaster, an Autobot spy, but Megatron buys time so Starscream can find Metroplex and upload the code, connecting himself with Metroplex. During the process, he gets captured by Jetfire and Goldbug.
#4	"Shards: Part Four"	Danny Lore	Dan Khanna and Priscilla Tramontano	John-Paul Bove	December 1, 2021
Goldbug was an Autobot desperate to earn his place as Optimus Prime's second-in-command, but when Megatron shot him to save Starscream, his body barely survived, but he was reconstructed with a new body. When Skywarp searches for Starcream, Goldbug kills him and takes his head, but Slicer tells him there are Insecticons on the way. As Goldbug kills them too, he decides to kill Starscream himself, despite Jetfire's protests.
#5	"Shards: Part Five"	Danny Lore	Guido Guidi; Inked by: Matt Froese	John-Paul Bove	December 22, 2021
As more Decepticons led by Megatron attack the fortress, Goldbug destroys Starscream's body and takes his spark, causing Jetfire to have enough of the Autobots and Decepticons. He then remembers the reason why Starscream always spared him during his battles. Jetfire reluctantly joins forces with Megatron to pursue Goldbug and take back Starscream's spark. Meanwhile, Slicer, who has been a spy of Ultra Magnus the whole time, reports to him about the current situation of Cybertron, with Magnus having his own plans to control the planet.
Shattered Glass II (2022)
#1	"War of the Titan: Part One"	Danny Lore	Marcelo Matere and Andrew Lee Griffith; Inked by: Gigi Dutreix	John-Paul Bove	August 31, 2022
A long time ago, Ultra Magnus acted as the legal advisor of Orion Pax by leading the Wreckers while Senator Shockwave worked in secret with the Decepticons. In present day, following the Decepticons' takeover of Gold City, Magnus kills Shockwave and begins a coup against Optimus in order to execute his agenda for Cybertron.
#2	"War of the Titan: Part Two"	Danny Lore	Dan Khanna	Thomas Deer	September 28, 2022
Blaster, a former Autobot reporter, is recruited by Slicer and Rodimus to infiltrate the New Kaon fortress through Decepticon Radio, a project lead and hosted by Soundwave. In New Kaon, Megatron and Jetfire argue about the events that led to Starscream's fate, unaware that Blaster is manipulating them into fighting each other. The latter then hacks the frequency in Decepticon Radio until he is spotted by Soundwave. Blaster manages to escape after causing a diversion, but Rodimus kills him after failing to destroy the information he downloaded. Slicer and Rodimus cover the event to not involve themselves while continuing with Magnus' plans.
#3	"War of the Titan: Part Three"	Danny Lore	Guido Guidi; Inked by: Matt Froese	John-Paul Bove and Ed Pirrie	November 2, 2022
Following the recent events, Ratchet gets relocated while Slicer returns to Metroplex's inside, where the Autobots patrol. By using Blaster's head and Soundwave's radio frequency, Slicer plans to contact the Wreckers in order to destroy Metroplex with explosives and take Starscream's spark, until he meets Goldbug. Slicer deceives him in helping him to achieve his goals, but when Metroplex gets activated for a few moments, a battle between Slicer and Goldbug starts after killing the Decepticons' Air Strike Patrol. Jetfire arrives to kill Goldbug before Slicer captures him to active Metroplex, but many other Decepticons arrive.
#4	"War of the Titan: Part Four"	Danny Lore	Dan Khanna; Inked by: Gigi Dutreix	John-Paul Bove and Ed Pirrie	November 23, 2022
Flamewar is the leader of a Decepticon squad of "pirates", who is decided to go to the Static Zone, despite going against Megatron and Jetfire's strategy, where they meet Rodimus and Slicer. Flamewar remembers Rodimus being the one who killed her previous leader, Cannonball, as well as the day she argued with Starscream when the Decepticons were forced to leave Megatron on Earth. After her fight with Rodimus, she is captured and taken as prisoner by the Wreckers, where Jetfire and Optimus are also there. Inside, Slipstream manages to save Flamewar before escaping and reuniting with Megatron and Soundwave.
#5	"War of the Titan: Part Five"	Danny Lore	Guido Guidi; Inked by: Matt Froese	John-Paul Bove	December 14, 2022
In the final battle, Soundwave convinces Slicer to join forces with him. Once they enter inside Metroplex, they discover Magnus convinced Ratchet to surgically operate and swap the minds of Magnus and Optimus into their respective bodies, Magnus believing in his insecurity that none of the Autobot gangs would follow him as himself, but assured that they would all follow him if he at least looked like Optimus Prime. Magnus spots Slicer and Soundwave, then orders Slicer to kill Soundwave. The latter communicates with Starscream's spark, which is merging with Metroplex's. Soundwave kills Rodimus to save Slicer before releasing Jetfire. Slicer, only there to save his friend Ratchet, escapes and Soundwave along with Jetfire, go to retrieve Starscream's spark. Jetfire removes Starscream's spark from Metroplex which deactivates him, causing the giant city-sized robot to start a long fall. Magnus attempts to stop Soundwave and Jetfire one last time before being shot and killed by Slicer who has sniped him from a distance, all done before Metroplex's head finally hits the ground. In the end, Soundwave reunites with Megatron and the other Decepticons.

=== Reception ===
Issue	Publication date	Critic rating	Critic reviews	Ref.
Transformers: Shattered Glass (2021)
#1	August 25, 2021	8.8/10	8	
#2	September 29, 2021	8.2/10	2	
#3	October 27, 2021	8.0/10	2	
#4	December 1, 2021	—N/a	—N/a	
#5	December 22, 2021	—N/a	—N/a	
Transformers: Shattered Glass II (2022)
#1	August 31, 2022	6.1/10	2	
#2	September 28, 2022	4.0/10	1	
#3	November 2, 2022	6.0/10	1	
#4	November 23, 2022	6.0/10	1	
#5	December 14, 2022	6.0/10	1	

=== Collected edition ===
==== Trade paperback ====
Title	Material collected	Pages	Publication date	ISBN
Transformers: Shattered Glass	Transformers: Shattered Glass #1–5	128	July 26, 2022	168405902X, 978-1684059027

==== Other ====
Title	Material collected	Publication date
Transformers: Best of Starscream	The Transformers: Infiltration #6; Transformers: Robots in Disguise #20; The Transformers Holiday Special; Transformers: Till All Are One #12; Transformers: Shattered Glass #3	September 2022
