= Kre-O =

Construction toy line

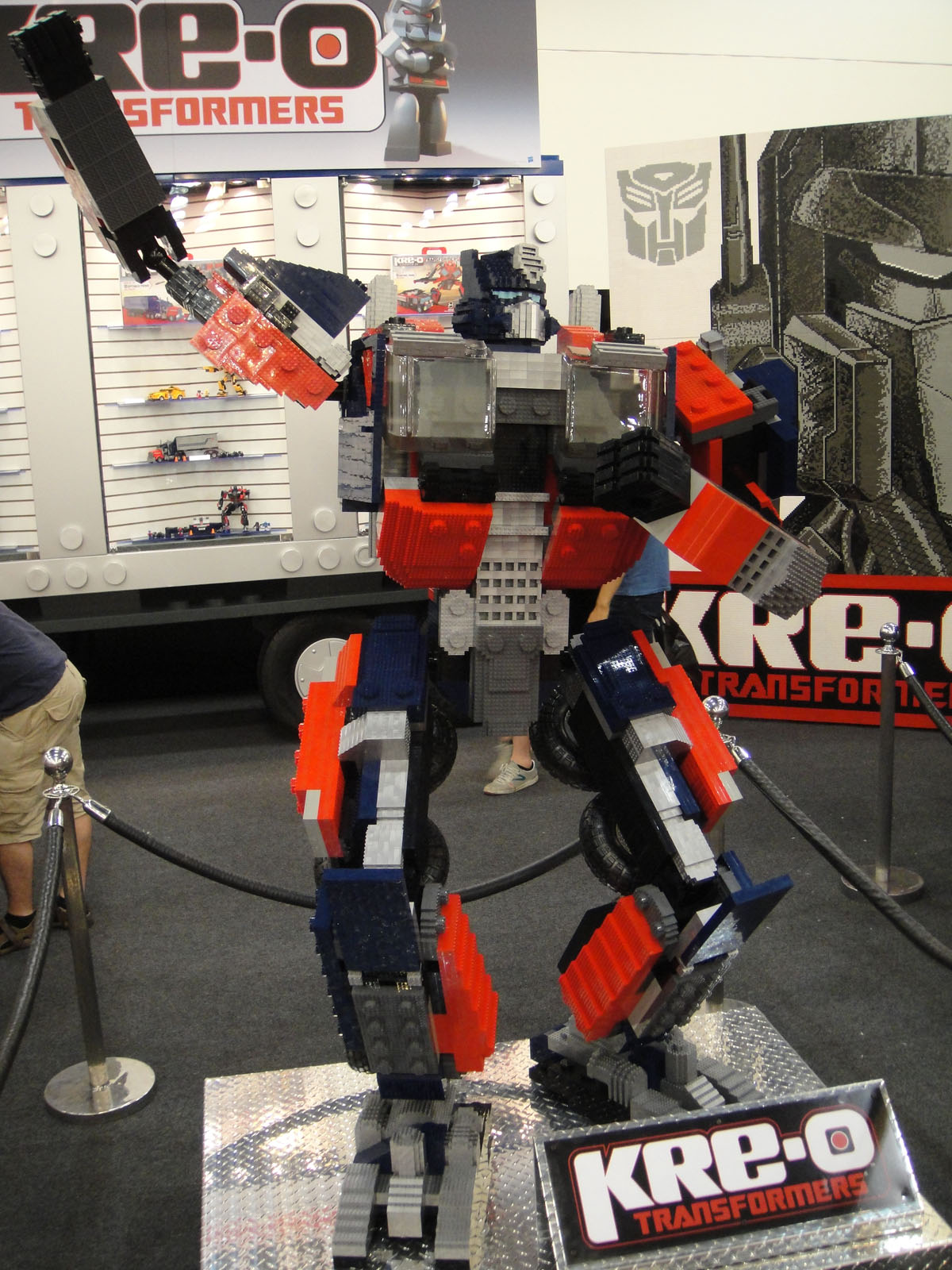
- Kre-O Transformers
- Type: Construction set
- Company: Hasbro
- Country: United States
- Availability: 2011–2017
- Official website

KRE-O is a line of construction toys manufactured by South Korea-based Oxford and marketed by Hasbro. Kre-O was released in stores in Fall 2011. The name Kre-O comes from the Latin word creo, which means "I create". Kre-O toys feature highly articulated humanoid figures called "Kreons". Kre-O blocks are compatible with Lego bricks and Lego minifigures, hence also compatible with Mega Bloks, Cobi, and other building block brands. After Transformers, Hasbro would not license further construction sets based on the Transformers series until Lego Icons.

== Toy lines ==
Kre-O Transformers is the first line of the Kre-O series. They were first shown in February 2011 at the American International Toy Fair trade show in New York. Transformers Kre-O figures include homages to their live action film, Timelines, Transformers: Prime and Beast Hunters sub-lines.

Kre-O G.I. Joe was released as the third Kre-O line in February 2013 as a Toys "R" Us exclusive. This collection is based primarily on Hasbro's G.I. Joe: A Real American Hero toy line, cartoons, and comic book series, but includes some Adventure Team Kreons as well.

Kre-O Star Trek was released as the fourth line of Kre-O sets in April 2013. The initial sets and Kreons are based on the 2009 reboot and its sequel Star Trek Into Darkness. A preview trailer was posted by Hasbro, first on Facebook, then later on YouTube. The trailer re-enacts the original "teaser trailer" for the first film, showing the construction of the U.S.S. Enterprise in Kre-O form and by Kreon construction workers. A press release made at the 2012 New York Toy Fair showed the completed Enterprise model (complete with flip-up "saucer" showing the ship's bridge) and Kreons of Kirk, Spock and Sulu.

At ComiCon International 2013, Hasbro announced new brand lines for Dungeons & Dragons and Cityville Invasion plus additional building sets for Star Trek, G.I. Joe and Transformers brand lines.

Kre-O Cityville Invasion is the fifth line of Kre-O sets, based on the popular CityVille online game series. This line introduces "Sonic Motion Technology", which triggers specific movements in special Kre-O bricks.

Kre-O Dungeons & Dragons is the sixth Kre-O line, released in January 2014. It is based on the popular role-playing game series of the same name.

In early 2017, Hasbro debuted a new line of product based on the Trolls movie.

== In other media ==
Kre-O was featured in a segment of Robot Chicken titled World War B, a spoof of the film World War Z, featuring Lego minifigures being attacked by Kre-O zombies that are also the imitation minifigures.
