= Guangdong Loongon =

Chinese toy manufacturer

Guangdong Loongon Animation & Culture Co., Ltd. (广东小白龙动漫文化股份有限公司), often referred to as Loongon, is a Chinese children's toy manufacturer based in Guangdong and founded in 2003. Loongon and its family of brands, including Lepin and Cogo are known for producing Lego-compatible brick sets. Loongon is publicly listed as of 2014 as stock 831015 on the Chinese stock exchange known as the National Equities Exchange and Quotations.

== Brands ==
The Loongon is the manufacturer and distributor of the following brands in North America and Europe:

- Loongon
- Kid's Dough
- Huimei Plastic Building Blocks

Lego-compatible:

- Cogo Plastic Building Blocks
- Lepin

== Controversies and legal issues ==
Lepin, a Loongon sub-brand, was accused by some Lego fan builders of taking their designs and creating commercial sets without permission. Subsequently, in 2016, it was sued by Lego for the manufacturing and distribution of copied Lego IP - not just the bricks, but also the boxes, logos and the user instruction manuals were very similar to those made by Lego. In 2018 Lego won the lawsuit, with Lepin being subject to a fine. In 2019, several Lepin executives were arrested, and company assets were seized by the police. In 2020, the ruling was upheld in the second-instance decision.

== See also ==
- Lego clone
