= Fun Publications =

Former publishing company (active 2005-2018)

- Industry: Comics; Fan club organizing
- Founded: 2005
- Headquarters: Fort Worth, Texas, U.S.
- Website: fpcomics.com

Fun Publications was a publishing company that ran the Transformers Collectors Club and the G.I. Joe Collectors Club under license from Hasbro. Besides releasing comics, Fun Publications released exclusive toys and ran conventions for their clubs.

Fun Publications also published a serial comic distributed as part of the official Transformer's Collector's Club magazine. There were six pages to the comic in each magazine, which together "make one complete story arc" by the end of the year with 36 pages in six months. The full strips from the first two years were distributed by IDW as Transformers Cybertron: Balancing Act.

In addition to releasing comic books and magazines Fun Publications Timelines series has also produced prose stories, licensed toys and video media. However, 2016 was announced as the final year in which Fun Publications would hold BotCon and host the Transformers Collectors Club.

In 2017, it was announced that 2018 would be the last year that the company would run the G.I.Joe Collectors Club, and at the 2018 convention employees told fans that the company would cease operations at the end of the year.

== Reception ==
The Timelines Landquake toy proved extremely popular. Critics of the comic have said that the stories play directly to the fans of the Transformers conventions and stories center on the toys being introduced each year.

== History ==
=== 2005 ===
After the Transformers convention license was acquired by Fun Publications, they issued a new series called Transformers: Timelines, a series of stand alone tales. The first comic was released in 2005 with a story called "Descent into Evil", starring a group of updated classic Autobots and new characters fighting the evil forces of Deathsaurus and his Insecticons. As would follow with each year's story, some of the characters appearing would be released as exclusive figures at Botcon.

=== 2006 ===
Their 2006 BotCon tale, "Dawn of Future's Past", acts as a prequel to the Beast Wars; and was distributed by Diamond in November 2006.

=== 2007 ===
A sequel to the Marvel Comics Generation 1 story called "Games of Deception" was the centerpiece for the 2007 comic. The story centered on the Decepticon Bug Bite's attempt to take over the Decepticon forces of Megatron. This story features the Transformers: Classics toy line as well as this year's Botcon exclusive toys. The text story Wreckers: Finale Part II was also released.

=== 2008 ===
The 2008 comic "Shattered Glass" takes place in the "Shattered Glass" universe, in which Classics Cliffjumper is hurled into an alternate reality where the Decepticons are heroic while the Autobots are evil tyrants. The text story "Gone Too Far" was also published.

=== 2009 ===
The story released for Botcon 2009, called "Wings of Honor", was set millions of years ago on Cybertron, a prequel to the Sunbow animated series. This story featured the Autobot veteran Kup in early days, as well as the club membership exclusive figure Dion. The text story "Eye in the Sky" was released, set on Shattered Glass Earth.

=== 2010 ===
The 2010 Timelines comic called "Generation 2: Redux" was among the top 25 sold small publisher comics in November 2010. This story featured a new generation of Autobot and Decepticons made on Earth led by the Autobot Spark and the Decepticon Clench.

=== 2011 ===
The story released for Botcon 2011 was "The Stunt-icon Job", a sequel to the Transformers: Animated cartoon.

=== 2012 ===
Botcon 2012 featured the comic "Invasion", a crossover between the G1 Classics universe and the Shattered Glass universe.

=== 2013 ===
Botcon 2013 featured "Machine Wars: Termination," a story involving a force led by Beast Machines generals Obsidian and Strika against Jhiaxus' army of clones.

=== 2014 ===
The story released for Botcon 2014 was "Hoist the Flag", set in the G1 Wings universe. "A Common Foe", the sequel to "Termination", was also released online.

=== 2015 ===
Botcon 2015 featured "Cybertron's Most Wanted", a story taking place in Axiom Nexus and involving a team assembled from the inhabitants of various alternate Transformers universes.

=== 2016 ===
2016, the final year for the convention under Fun Publications, featured a commemorative story for the Beast Wars 20th Anniversary entitled "Dawn of the Predacus." This storyline, set thirty years after The Transformers: The Movie and 300 years before the Beast Wars, involves the Tripredacus Council and several of their fellow Predacons engaging the Maximals.

=== 2018 ===
The company presented the last G.I.Joe Collectors Club Convention in Chattanooga Tennessee at the end of June.
