= Mega Brands =

Canadian toy company

Mega Brands Inc.
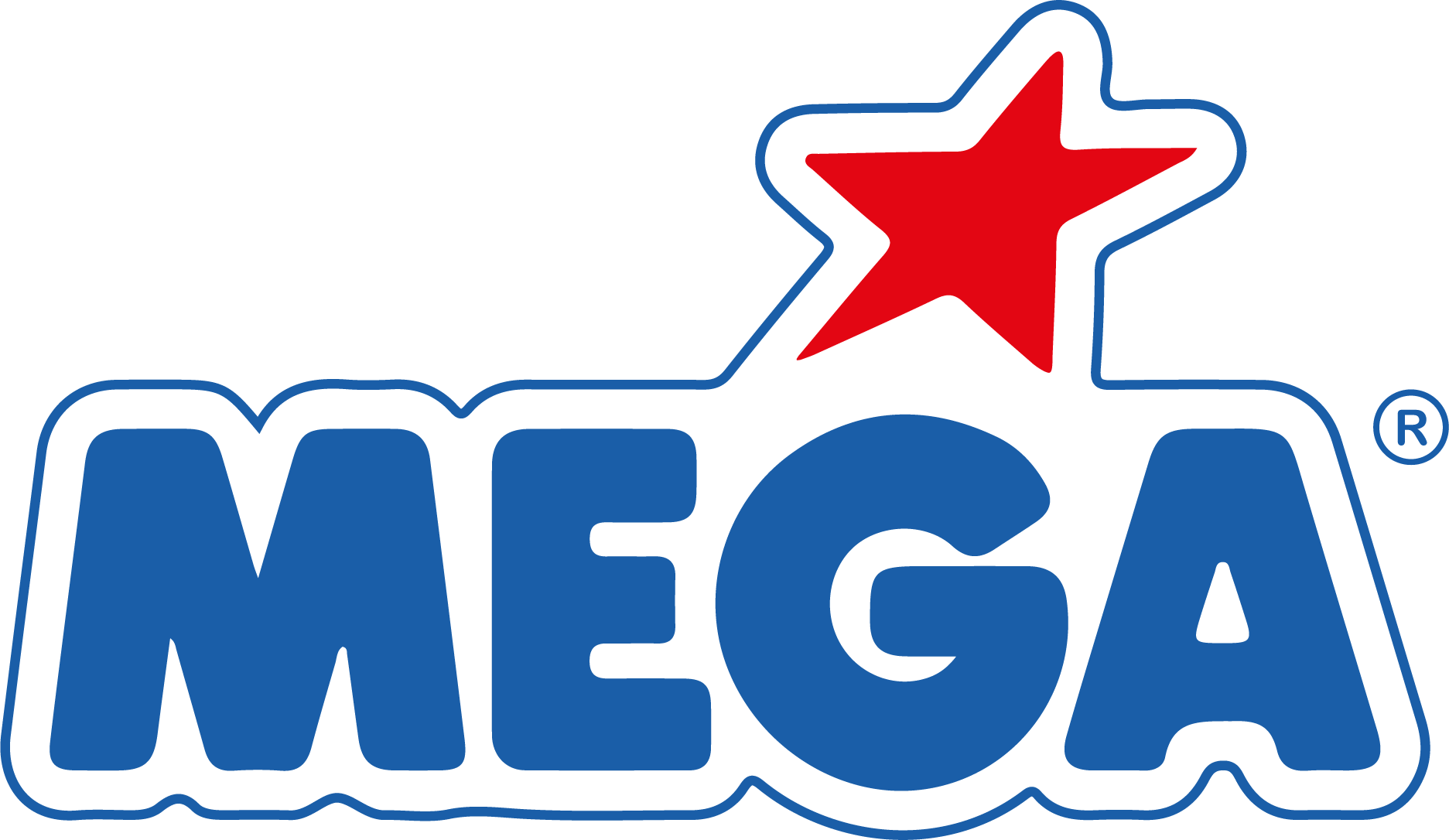
- Formerly: Ritvik Holdings (1967–2002); Mega Bloks Inc. (2002–2006)
- Type: Brand
- Traded as: TSX: MB
- Industry: Toys; Stationery and crafts
- Founded: 1967; 59 years ago
- Founders: Victor and Rita Bertrand
- Headquarters: Montreal, Quebec, Canada
- Key people: Marc Bertrand (CEO); Vic Bertrand (CIO)
- Products: Construction toys; Message boards; Activity kits; Art materials; School supplies; Writing instruments; Wood products; Puzzles
- Brands: Board Dudes; Locker Dudes; Mega Bloks; Mega Construx; Mega Puzzles; Mega Brands America; Write Dudes
- Revenue: $1.08 billion (Est. FY 2020) ▲
- Number of employees: 1,700 (2018)
- Parent: Mattel (2014–present)
- Website: megabrands.com

Mega Brands Inc. (formerly Mega Bloks Inc. and Ritvik Holdings) is a Canadian children's toy company. Currently a wholly owned subsidiary of Mattel, the company distributes a wide range of construction toys, puzzles, and craft-based products. Mega Bloks, a line of construction set toys, is its most popular product. Its other brands include Mega Construx, Mega Puzzles, and Board Dudes.

In 2016, Mega Brands' Bloks was the second in worldwide sales (11%) of toy construction building sets.

== History ==
=== Ritvik Holdings ===
In 1967, Victor Bertrand and his wife Rita founded the company as Ritvik Holdings (RH). Ritvik is a portmanteau word based on a combination of Rita and Victor. RH began by distributing toys made outside Canada and also facilitated contracts between foreign brands and Canadian manufacturers.

Ritvik later became a vertically integrated company as it expanded by adding plastic injection molding operations, design operations, tooling manufacturers, and marketing services. The company had a leading share of the Canadian plastic injection molded toy market by the early 1980s.

Wanting to expand beyond Canada, Victor Bertrand took an interest in construction block sets. He saw room for growth despite them being an industry staple since the early years of the 20th century when the Batima Block was released in Belgium in 1905. With Lego being the leading construction toy, Bertrand chose to make a similar set. Bertrand ignored friends and advisors, feeling he had two advantages in launching Mega Bloks: he aimed to produce jumbo-sized bricks for toddlers, who Lego bricks were not designed for, and he considered his expertise in injection molding would give him a price advantage.

At 1984 trade shows, Ritvik showed the Mega Bloks line in the US and Canada. An immediate hit, Mega Bloks had generally large sales in Canada, including a $1 million sale to Toys "R" Us, and were available almost anywhere in the two markets in 1985. Several multinational companies had made offers just after the trade show for distribution rights, as well as to buy either Mega Bloks or RH itself.

By 1989, Mega Bloks were in 30 countries and popular in Europe, the US and Canada. Up to 30 play sets were available. A piano set with Mega Blok-compatible keys for the preschool market was released in 1988. In 1989, Ritvik sold all of its other toy and plastics lines.

A Mega Bloks "Micro" line was released in 1991; these were compatible with or a clone of Lego bricks. This finally placed Ritvik and The Lego Group in direct competition. Lego Canada soon sued Ritvik for unfair competition, claiming a likelihood of confusion between its Micro Mega Bloks and the Lego line. Since Lego's brick shape patent had expired, the lawsuit dragged on for years as sales grew worldwide (at an average 70% a year until the mid-1990s), but finally Ritvik won the case by clearly distinguishing its brand from Lego. Suits were filed in Europe and the U.S. with similar results.

In 1996, a 28% share of Ritvik was sold to the Blackstone Group. Rita Bertrand and her daughter Chantal retired that year, while Marc and Victor Bertrand Jr. were active in management. Two international subsidiaries were formed, Mega Bloks Latinoamerica S.A. de C.V. in 1997 and Mega Bloks Europe N.V. in 1998. International sales in the 1990s were at 30%, with 70% from Canada and the US; all but 10% were from four major chains: Toys 'R Us, Wal-Mart, Target, and Kmart.

Ritvik followed the late 1990s licensing trend in 1998, with its first licensing agreement being for Teletubbies, followed by an agreement with Fisher-Price with its Sesame Street characters license. A NASCAR line was also introduced. Ritvik Toys, Inc. was amalgamated with Ritvik Holdings Inc. on June 30, 1998.

Lego, K'Nex and Ritvik added features to their lines in 2000. Ritvik made transformable building sets that changed into vehicles, and a remote control electronic kit named the Mega Bloks RO Action Builder. Ritvik also added TV advertising that year with a $2 million campaign; the company spent $30 million on advertising, marketing, and research and development in 2002.

=== Mega Bloks ===
With sales having approximately doubled since 1999, Ritvik went public via an initial public offering in May 2002 on the Toronto Stock Exchange under the new name of Mega Bloks Inc. The company traded at $14.50 a share. The founders' sons, Victor Bertrand Jr. and Marc Bertrand, became chief operating officer and chief operating officer/president, respectively, while Victor Sr. remained chairman of the board.

The toy market was in a down cycle from 2002 to 2003, with the construction toy segment losing 10 to 15%, but Mega Bloks experienced increased sales. Since 1986, the company had seen a run of 17 years of growth, becoming number two in the construction toy segment behind Lego.

In 2003, the company formed a joint venture with the Japanese toy company Bandai for Asia. Bandai marketed Mega Blok sets with their existing licensed Japanese cartoon characters. With the success of movies of J.K. Rowling's Harry Potter books and J.R.R. Tolkien's Lord of the Rings, a Dragon series was released in 2003. Mega Play!, a block set large enough for children to fit inside, was also launched.

With shares trading at almost $30, in 2005 Mega Bloks, Inc. acquired Rose Art Industries, including its Magnetix line of toys, for US$350 million. Soon, Magnetix was a source of lawsuits resulting from choking incidents, causing its share value to drop quickly. Magnetix was then recalled. The company acquired Board Dudes, Inc., makers of Board Dudes posting and marking boards and Locker Dudes locker products, in January 2006, through its Rose Art Industries subsidiary.

=== Mega Brands ===
On June 15, 2006, following the acquisition of several brand names not associated with construction brick toys, the company again changed its name, this time from Mega Bloks Inc. to Mega Brands Inc. with Rose Art Industries, Inc. being renamed Mega Brands America, Inc.

After 23 consecutive years of growing sales and profit, Mega lost $458 million in 2008. Heading towards bankruptcy, the company refinanced. Shares were consolidated 1-for-20, with Fairfax Financial becoming a major partner in the recapitalization.

Rose Art was placed on the market in March 2008 as a result of inquiries from the previous owners and others. The former owners of Rose Art, Jeffrey and Lawrence Rosen, offered to purchase it back in April 2008. They then sued company management for insider trading in September 2008, alleging shares were sold prior to the Magnetix recall. Rose Art's base operation was shut down in New Jersey, and in 2010 the company moved its stationery and activities division, with some key employees, to Irvine, California, under new executive Thomas Prichard, a former executive at Crayola, Pixar, and Hasbro. The subsidiary was not sold, and was reintegrated into Mega operations by 2012.

On February 28, 2014, it was announced that Mattel, Inc. would acquire Mega Brands Inc. for approximately US$450 million. It became a wholly owned subsidiary of Mattel as of April 20, 2014. Prior to the purchase, Mega and Mattel were partners in adding Mattel brands to Mega "Worlds" plus a line for Mattel's American Girl that competes with Lego's Friends line.

Three years later, on February 10, 2017, Mattel announced that it was introducing Mega Construx, a new sub-brand of construction sets designed for children four and up as well as adult collectors. Construx's first license property line was Pokémon, launched in mid-2017, until the license was lost in 2025.

In March 2021, LaRose Industries, the company founded by Lawrence Rosen in 2008, announced it purchased the RoseArt brand from Mattel. The purchase reunites the RoseArt brand with the Rosen family.

== Product types ==
=== Construction ===
- Bricks
  - Mega Bloks - original large size for preschool now branded under 1st Builders
  - Mega Blocks - intermediate size - compatible with Duplo now branded under Junior Builders
  - Mega Bloks micro - Lego compatible bricks
- Mega Construx now branded under Wonder Builders & Advanced Builder lines Lego compatible bricks

Mega Construx micro figures do not follow the iconic Lego modular mini figures: instead their figures allow up to 16 articulation points, i.e. poses and customization.

In 2022, many lines of Mega Construx were rebranded to MEGA with a purple logo. Some products from prior years have been sold with either branding.

== Pop culture connections ==
Mega Bloks were featured in a commercial for the Honda Element, in which bricks fell from the sky to assemble the full-sized vehicle. The commercial clearly identifies the bricks as Mega Bloks in the opening moments of the sequence.

Mega Brands currently has the licensing rights for Thomas the Tank Engine, video game franchises Call of Duty and Halo, Barbie, Hot Wheels, Masters of the Universe, Power Rangers, American Girl, Monster High, Destiny, Elder Scrolls, The Witcher, and used to have the rights for Pokémon and the Despicable Me franchise. Mega Brands owned the license from Nickelodeon franchises like SpongeBob SquarePants and Teenage Mutant Ninja Turtles after Lego discontinued their version of these licensed sets. They also have the rights to produce sets based on Nick Jr. Channel properties like Paw Patrol, Blaze and the Monster Machines, and Shimmer and Shine. They have even recently picked the license for Alien as well.

== Themes ==
=== Original ===
- Alien Agency
- Command Ops
- Creature Seekers
- Dinosaurs
- Dragons
- Dragons Universe
- Grip-n-Clip
- Gyro Fighters
- Legends: King Arthur
- Machines
- Mag Warriors
- NEO Shifters
- Pyrates
- Transforming Blok-Bots
- Warriors
- Xtreme Sports

=== License Brands ===
- Thomas & Friends
- Teletubbies
- Barbie
- Hot Wheels (2013–Present)
- Monster High
- American Girl
- Masters of the Universe
- Power Rangers (2003-2006, 2011-2014, 2017)
- Halo
- Call of Duty (2013–2021)
- Destiny
- In the Night Garden
- Bob the Builder (2016-2018)
- Blaze and the Monster Machines
- Shimmer and Shine
- SpongeBob SquarePants (2014-2016)
- Pokémon (2017–2025)
- Hello Kitty (2011-2015)
- Game of Thrones (2019)
- Teenage Mutant Ninja Turtles (2003-2005, 2016)
- Marvel
- Pirates of the Caribbean (2006–2007)
- Cars
- Sesame Street
- Star Trek (2013)
- Skylanders
- Borderlands
- Despicable Me (2015-2018)
- Dinotrux
- Spider-Man 3 (2007)
- The Amazing Spider-Man (2012–2014)
- Marvel Cinematic Universe
- Hellboy
- Need for Speed
- Assassin's Creed
- God of War
- PJ Masks
- Ni Hao, Kai-Lan
- Go, Diego, Go!
- Dora the Explorer
- The Backyardigans
- Yo Gabba Gabba!
- Wonder Pets!
- Alien
- Predator
- Terminator
- World of Warcraft
- Disney Princess
- Winnie the Pooh
- Toy Story
- Mickey Mouse Clubhouse
- The Lion King
- Frozen
- Paw Patrol
- Futurama
- Family Guy
- The Smurfs
- Moshi Monsters
- WordWorld
- Chuggington
- Dinosaur Train
- Generator Rex

== Lego lawsuits ==
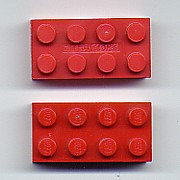
Mega Bloks building block (above) and Lego building brick (below)

Mega Brands has won 14 cases launched by competitor Lego regarding its Mega Bloks.

The Lego Group has filed lawsuits against Mega Bloks, Inc. in courts around the world on the grounds that Mega Bloks' use of the "studs and tubes" interlocking brick system is a violation of trademarks held by Lego. Generally such lawsuits have been unsuccessful, chiefly because the functional design of the basic brick is considered a matter of patent rather than trademark law, and all relevant Lego patents expired as of 1988.

On November 17, 2005, the Supreme Court of Canada upheld Mega Bloks' right to continue selling the product in Canada. A similar decision was reached by the European Union's Court of First Instance on November 12, 2008, when it upheld an EU trademark agency decision following an objection by Mega Bloks against a trademark awarded to Lego in 1999.

On September 14, 2010, the European Court of Justice ruled that the 8-peg design of the original Lego brick "merely performs a technical function [and] cannot be registered as a trademark."

== See also ==
- Mattel Brick Shop, another construction set brand owned by Mattel
- Oxford (toy company)
