= Best-Lock =

Brand of construction toy

Best-Lock Group Ltd.
- Type: Private
- Founded: 1997
- Founder: Torsten Geller
- Headquarters: Colne, England
- Number of locations: 6
- Key people: Torsten Geller (CEO); Ben Page; (Managing Director UK); Sven Hasselberg; (Managing Director Germany); Jan Geller; (Head of Global Design and MD Germany)
- Products: Toys
- Subsidiaries: Cobi (part)
- Website: best-lock.com

Best-Lock Construction Toys is a brand of plastic building bricks that are compatible with Lego. Best-Lock Group Limited, which manufacture the bricks, is based in Colne, Lancashire, England.

== History ==
Best-Lock was founded in 1997 by Torsten Geller after he looked into the legalities of Lego and other clones.

In 2000, Lego filed a three-dimensional trademark for its mini-figures, which Best Lock had duplicated since 1998. In 2012, Best Lock sued to get the trademark revoked. On 16 June 2015, the European Court of Justice upheld Lego's figure trademark. Lego had in 2009 filed its copyright claims into a U.S. Customs database that led to the seizure of Best-Lock shipments coming in from Asia. In October 2011, Lego filed in US District Court in Hartford filed against Best-Lock over the mini-figure trademark.

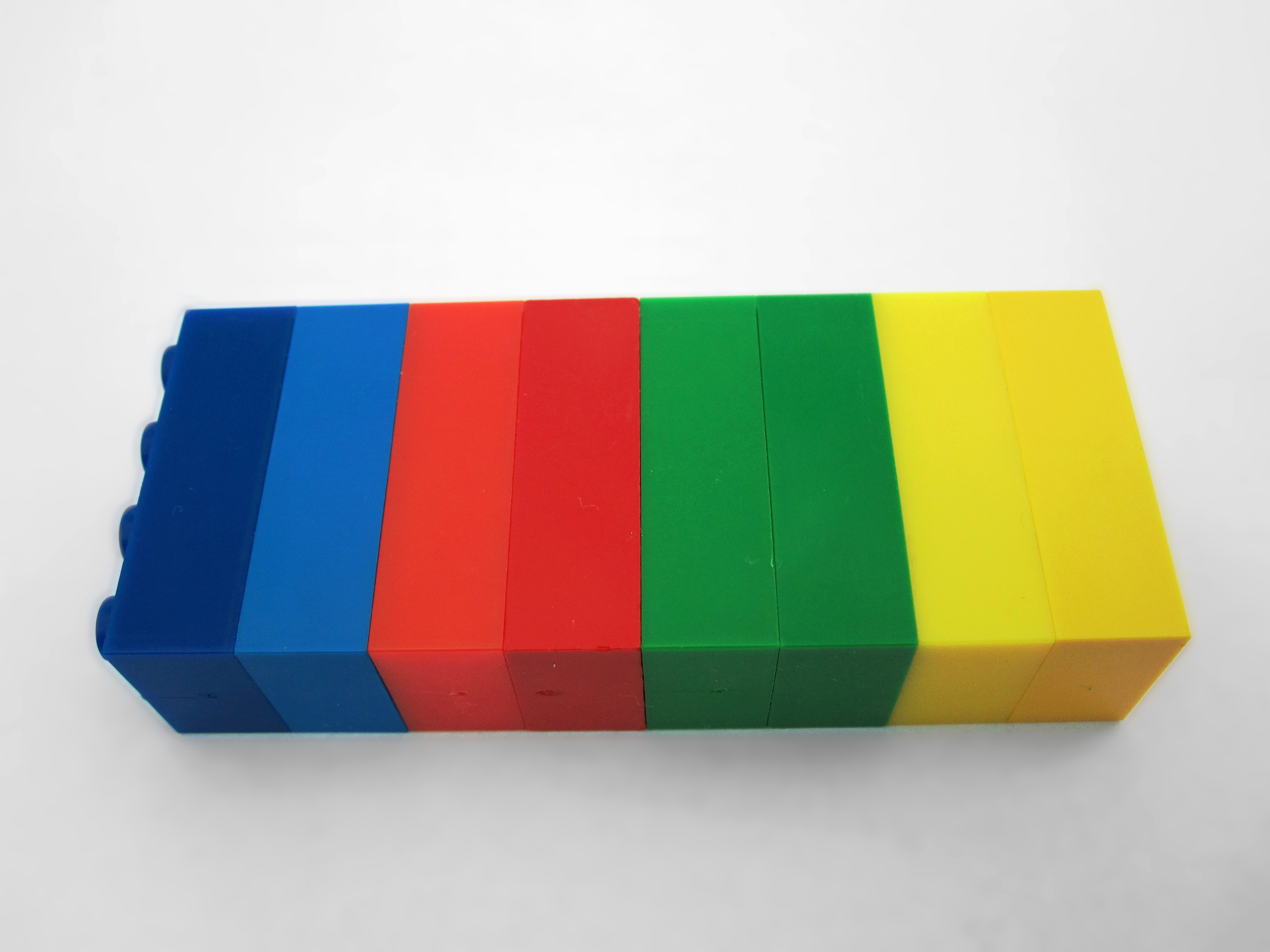
Best-Lock bricks can be connected to Lego bricks. These bricks alternate Best-Lock then Lego in pairs, from left to right.

Best-Lock has been involved with multiple legal cases involving Lego. The company moved in 1998 against Lego's exclusivity claims to toy-block design. Best-Lock won the case, thus allowing them to sell sets in Germany. They defeated a patent challenge from Lego in 2004. In a further case in 2009, Lego was denied trademark protection for the shape of its bricks.

Best-Lock merged with Cobi, a Polish building block manufacturer in 2006. The merger has since yielded co-branded building block toys.

In 2000, Lego filed a three-dimensional trademark for its mini-figures, which Best Lock had duplicated since 1998. In 2012, Best-Lock sued to have the trademark revoked, but the European Court of Justice upheld Lego's figure trademark.

== Products ==
Best-Lock offers different sized blocks including standard blocks, Junior Blocks (young children 2–5), and Baby Blocks (For kids 0–2). Themes for standard blocks include town sets (police, fire and construction), military, pirates, farming, and Kimmy (Best-Lock sets made for females). Licensed sets include The Terminator and Stargate SG-1 themes.

== See also ==
- Lego clone
