= Hasbro iON =

Video game console by Hasbro

iON
- Developer: GestureTek
- Manufacturer: Hasbro (USA)
- Type: Home video game console
- Generation: Fifth generation
- Released: 2006
- Media: CD

The iON is a home video game console that was produced by Hasbro's Playskool brand in 2006.

== Description ==
Announced in 2005, the iON was released in the Fall of 2006. The iON came bundled with 1 game and 1 sampler disc and released alongside 5 additional games.

== List of titles released ==
There are 6 games released.

- The Batman: Shadows of Gotham City
- Blue's Room: Birthday Party Surprise
- Danny Phantom: Ghosts on the Loose
- Dora the Explorer: The Great Soccer Ball Adventure
- LazyTown: Challenge for the Beach
- SpongeBob SquarePants: Best Day Ever (Bundled with the console)
