= BlueBrixx =

German building block brand

- Industry: Construction toys
- Founded: 2018; 7 years ago in Flörsheim am Main, Germany
- Founder: Klaus Kiunke
- Headquarters: Flörsheim am Main, Germany
- Area served: Germany
- Products: Building blocks and accessories
- Owner: BB Services GmbH
- Website: www.bluebrixx.com

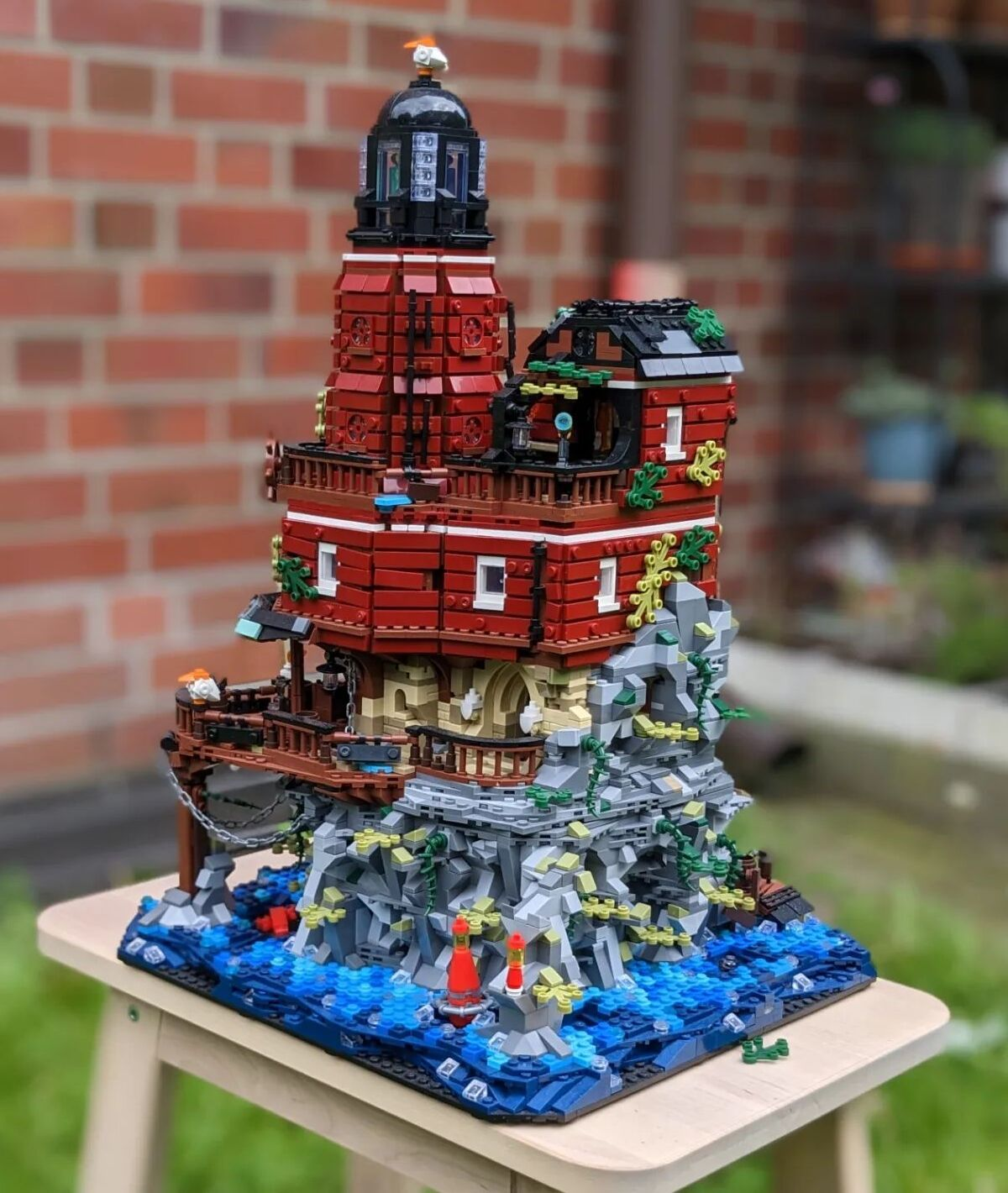
Bluebrixx Astronomers Lighthouse (6886 pieces)

BlueBrixx is a German building block toy brand that sells Lego-compatible bricks, models, and sets. The brand is known as a competitor to Lego due to its compatible bricks and lower prices.

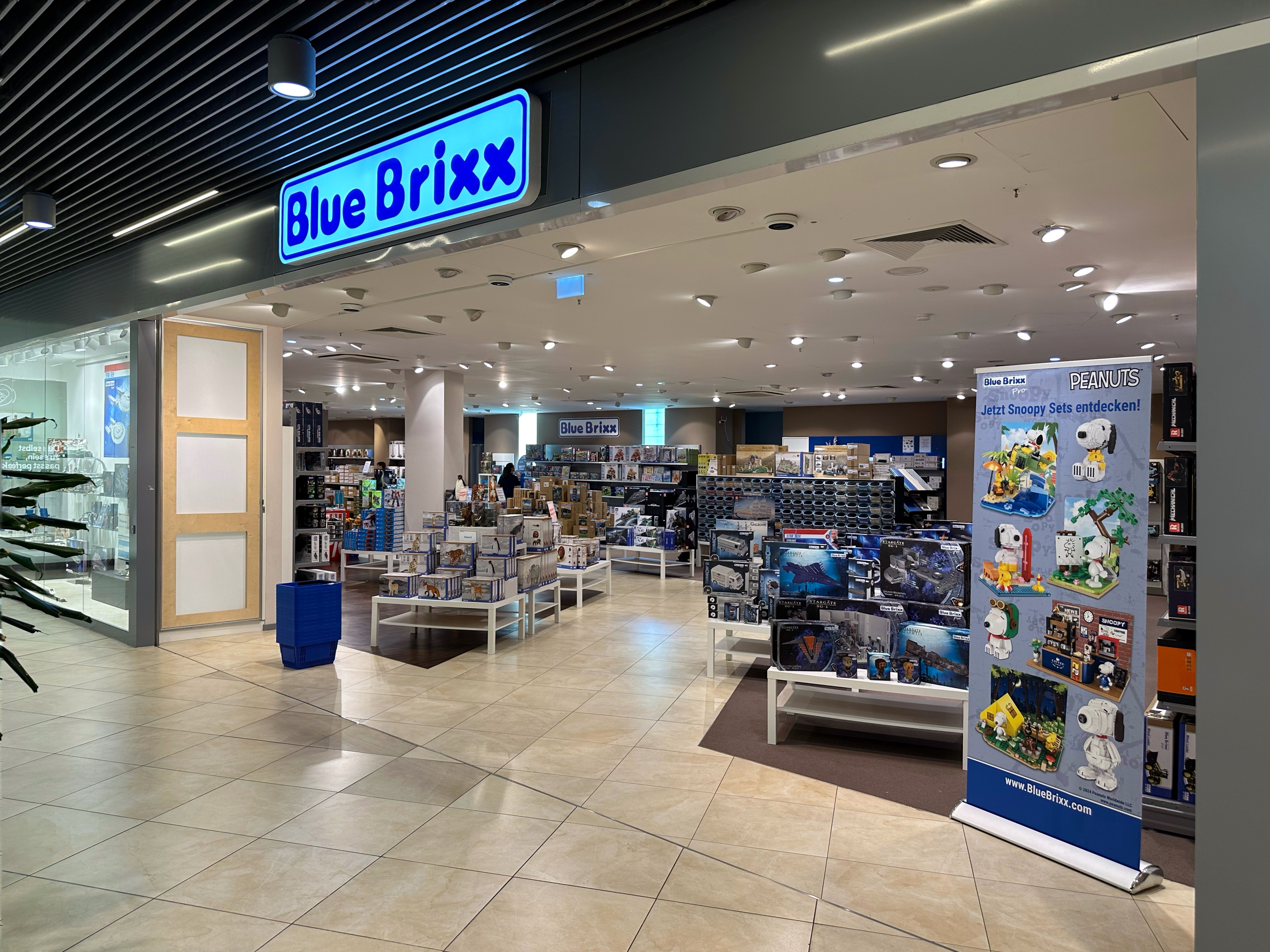
A BlueBrixx store in Kaiserslautern

The brand has been registered under BB Services GmbH in Flörsheim am Main since 2019. BlueBrixx has faced repeated legal disputes with Lego.

== Products ==
BlueBrixx produces its own brand of building blocks while selling products from other brands such as CaDa, Cobi, and Xingbao.

BlueBrixx focuses on display models, often featuring detailed and realistic designs rather than play functions. BlueBrixx generally avoids licensed products and offers digital-only building instructions for its BlueBrixx Specials series.

While most of its product range remains stable, some sets are re-released with improvements. The company has introduced some licensed products from franchises such as Star Trek, Stargate, and RoboCop, as well as German vehicle brands like Schlingmann and Ziegler. BlueBrixx also offers children's toy sets.

== History ==
BlueBrixx was founded in 2018 by German entrepreneur Klaus Kiunke. The company, based in Flörsheim am Main, specializes in distributing building block sets that include both original designs and collaborations with Chinese manufacturers.

The first BlueBrixx retail store opened in mid-2020 in Hagen, followed by additional locations in cities like Wildau, Munich, and Nuremberg. As of January 2025, BlueBrixx operates 39 stores in Germany.

== Legal disputes ==
In 2021, Lego obtained an injunction against the sale of certain BlueBrixx minifigures. While Lego's patent protection for its building blocks had expired, it held trademark rights for minifigures. BlueBrixx appealed the decision, but courts ruled in Lego's favor.

BlueBrixx later sued the European Union Intellectual Property Office before the General Court of the European Union, which upheld the previous ruling in 2023 but acknowledged that Lego-compatible minifigures were not universally protected.

In 2024, Lego filed another lawsuit against BlueBrixx, claiming infringement of industrial design and copyright.
