= Mattel Brick Shop =

Brand of construction sets

- Other names: Brick Shop
- Type: Construction sets
- Company: Mattel
- Availability: 2025–present

Mattel Brick Shop is a brand of construction sets produced by Mattel. The product line was first released in 2025, and has been described as a competitor to Lego.

== Release ==
The product line was first revealed at the Nuremberg International Toy Fair in February 2025. Seven sets were released initially, which were based on Mattel's Hot Wheels toy line. In early 2026, collaborations with several more car companies were announced.

== See also ==
- Mega Brands
