= Cobi (building blocks) =

Polish building block brand

Cobi S.A.
- The current logo of Cobi since 2024.
- Founded: April 1987; 39 years ago in Warsaw, Poland
- Founder: Robert Podleś
- Headquarters: Poland
- Products: Toys
- Owner: Robert Podleś
- Website: cobi.pl

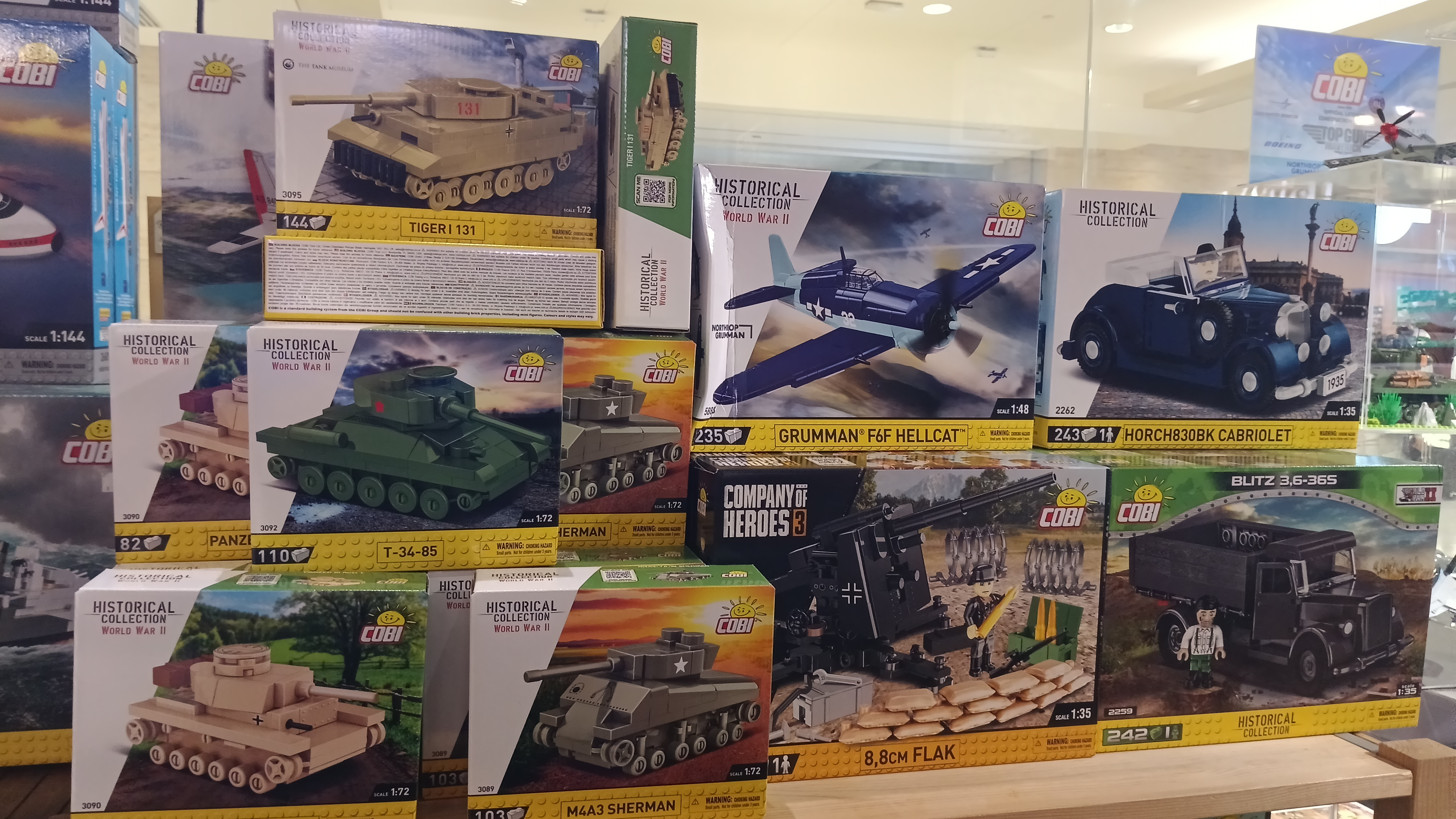
Cobi sets on sale at a toy store in CityLink Mall, Singapore.

Cobi S.A, also simply known as Cobi, is a Polish building block toy brand, known for producing brick-built models of cars and military vehicles. Although traditionally considered a Lego clone, Cobi uses original minifigure designs and they also produces sets with military themes, which Lego usually avoids.

== History ==
Cobi S.A. was founded in 1987 by Polish entrepreneur Robert Podleś as a seller of board games, puzzles and imported arcade games. It later began importing toys from American markets to be sold in Poland. In 1992, Cobi began to produce its first building block sets that followed the pattern and structural design of Lego products. Cobi opened a new office, headquarters and a major production plant for their building block sets in Mielec in 1996. In 2006, Cobi merged with American company Best-Lock which allowed them to distribute their products to worldwide markets, starting with America.

=== Dispute with Lego ===
Between 1990–2001, Cobi entered into constant disputes with The Lego Group with the latter accusing the former of plagiarism. The Lego Group eventually filed a lawsuit against Cobi, but the lawsuit was dismissed after it was found out that the patent for traditional Lego blocks (not including unique sculpted blocks or minifigures) had expired in 1978. Lego, however, remained a competitor brand of Cobi.

== Products ==
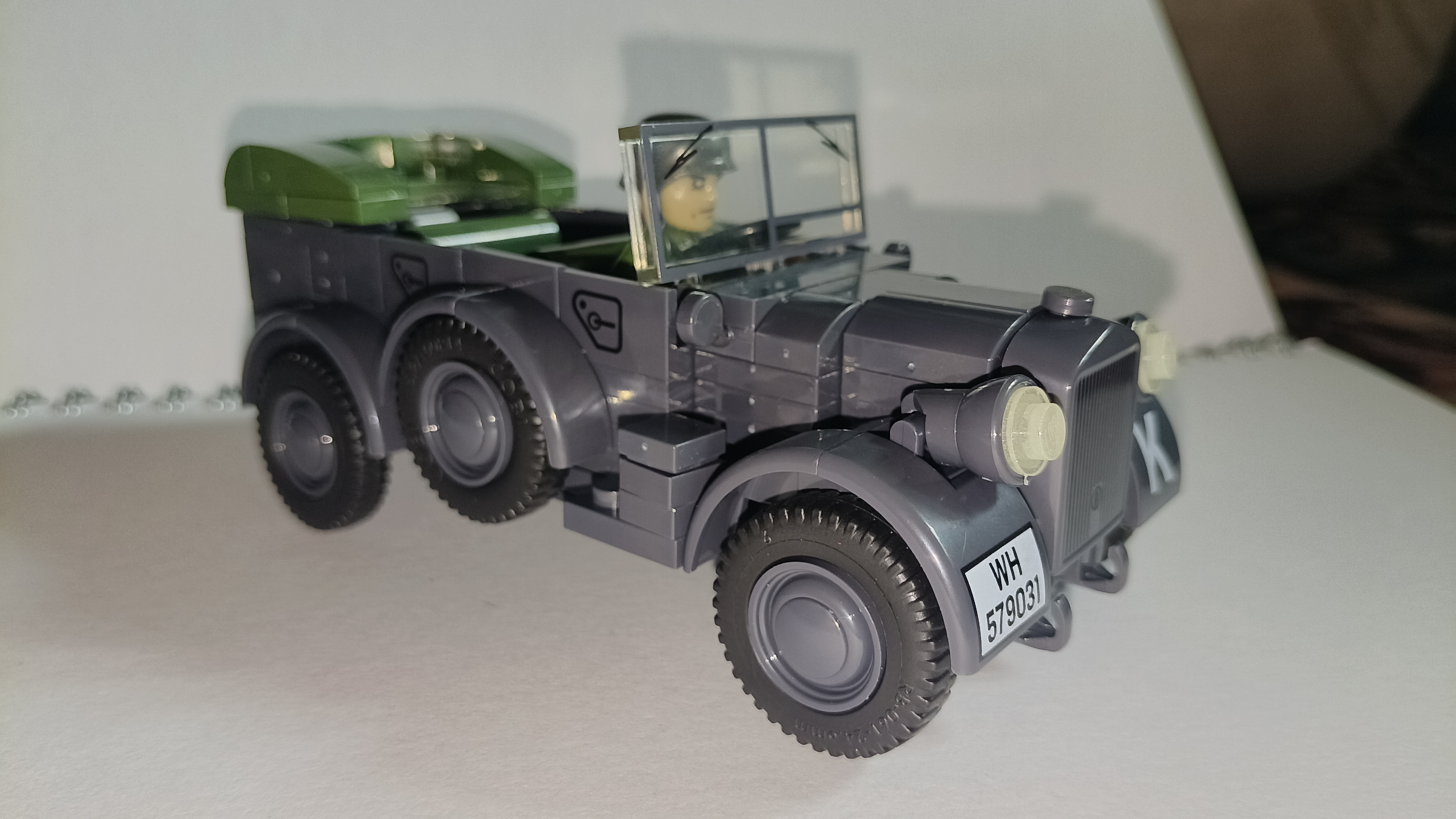
A model of a 1937 Horch 901, with German Heer driver inside.

Cobi mainly specializes in military-themed building block sets that are intended as model kits. Cobi has repeatedly stated that their products are not intended to glorify war or fascism and are only intended as models based on history. Aside from military-themed sets, Cobi also produces brick-built models of licensed cars and trucks.

== Collaborations ==
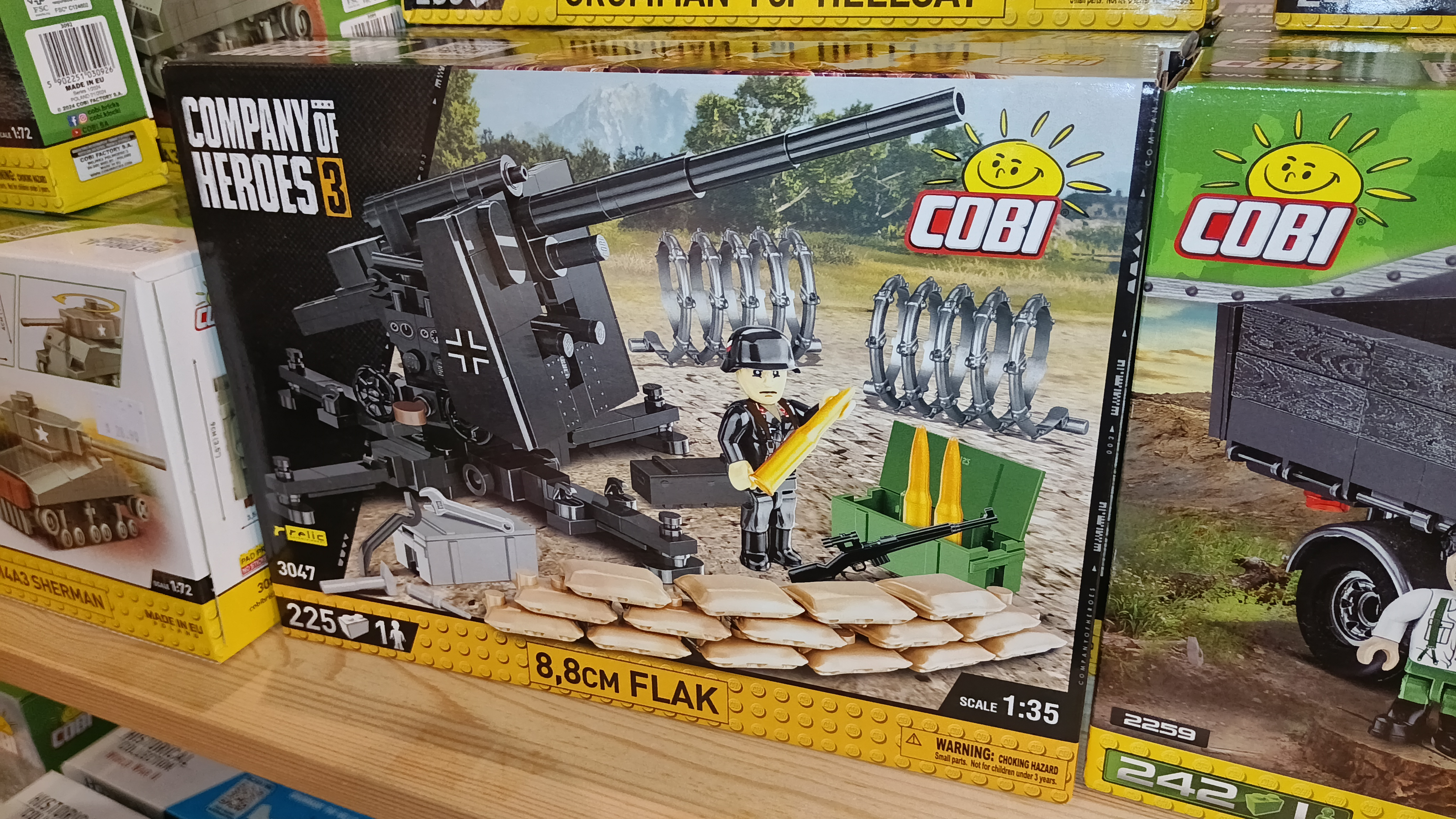
A Cobi set with Company of Heroes 3 branding.

Cobi has collaborated with the Bovington Tank Museum of Dorset, releasing a series of models that are exclusively sold in the museum's gift shop. There have also been collaborations with video games. In 2018, Cobi released a series of tank models in collaboration with online game World of Tanks. Exclusive codes to redeem virtual items were included with the models. Cobi also collaborated with the video game Company of Heroes 3 and released several 1/35 scaled sets based on scenes in the game.

== Competitors ==
The main competitor of Cobi is Lego, which is considered the father of building block toys. Unlike Lego, Cobi sets enter into themes of military and war, which Lego avoids. Another competitor of Cobi is Quanguan, a Chinese company that also produces brick-built models of military vehicles.

== See also ==
- Lego clone
- BlueBrixx
