= Batima =

Belgian construction toy and pioneer of the stud-based interlocking brick

Batima was a Belgian construction toy invented in the early 1920s by Louis Cousin. The bricks, made from the casein plastic Galalith, are considered one of the earliest stud-based building brick systems and a direct predecessor of modern interlocking bricks such as Kiddicraft and Lego.

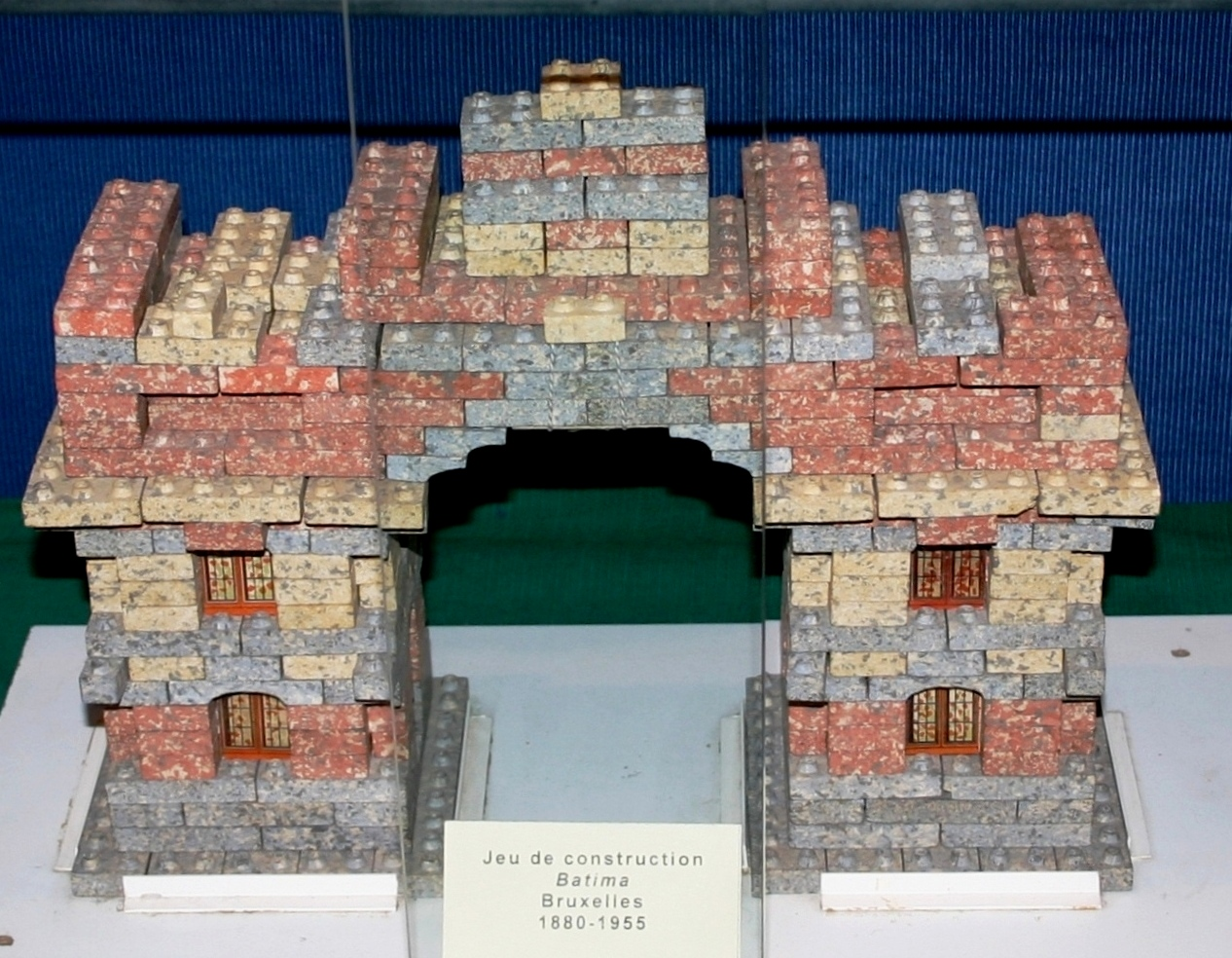
Batima bricks in a display case at the Musée du jouet et de l'enfant in Ferrières, Belgium

== History ==
Louis Cousin filed the Batima patent in Belgium in 1923 (Patent BE 311029). In 1924, corresponding patents were filed in France (FR 588 985) and the United Kingdom (GB 217 243).

In 1954, the Belgian company Nazaire Beeusaert — previously known for papier-mâché animals and small military figures — expanded its toy range and took over the manufacture and distribution of Batima bricks. The Galalith bricks could not compete against the emerging competition from modern thermoplastic toys, and in 1959 Beeusaert ceased production and sales.

== Construction and materials ==
The Batima bricks had studs on the upper face and matching sockets on the lower face. The studs tapered slightly upward in a conical shape and provided horizontal stabilisation only — unlike later interlocking bricks, the Batima system had no clamping force.

The material used was Galalith, a thermoset plastic made from casein and formaldehyde. Cousin described the material as "stone cardboard" (Steinpappe), noting in his patent application that it was not as heavy or cold as real stone, felt soft and pleasant to the touch, and had a matte finish like clay. The bricks were formed by machine in a thermoplastic process and then hardened in a formaldehyde bath. A 2×4 Batima brick weighs approximately ten times as much as a modern 2×4 Lego brick.

== Range ==
The Batima range comprised basic bricks in sizes 1×2, 2×2, 2×3, and 2×4, as well as arched bricks, angled bricks, and two bridge bricks. Early sets were supplied in wooden crates (approximately 38 × 30 × 6 cm, around 5 kg) with bricks in blue, yellow, and red; four different sets were available. Later sets appeared in illustrated cardboard boxes, and grey and black bricks were added. Printed thick cardboard cards for windows and doors were included for insertion between bricks, along with small wooden pieces with grooves for window sills and steps.

== Significance ==
Batima is regarded as the first building brick system with studs on the upper face and corresponding sockets on the lower face, anticipating the fundamental principle later developed by systems such as Kiddicraft (1939) and Lego (1949). However, no direct material succession occurred: where Batima used the thermoset Galalith, successor systems used rubber (Bild-O-Brik, Minibrix) or thermoplastics such as cellulose acetate, polystyrene, and later ABS — only the elasticity of these materials made the characteristic clamping force of interlocking bricks possible.

The official patent timeline establishes Batima (BE 311029, June 1923) as predating the British Kiddicraft patent (GB 529,580, 1939) by 16 years, and the early Lego brick (1949) by 26 years.

== See also ==
- Louis Cousin (inventor)
- Kiddicraft
- Hilary Page
- Lego brick
