= Bild-O-Brik =

1934 American rubber interlocking construction toy

Bild-O-Brik was an interlocking rubber construction toy manufactured by the Rubber Specialties Company Incorporated of Conshohocken, Pennsylvania, beginning in 1934. It is among the earliest known stud-and-socket interlocking building brick systems, based on a patent filed in 1932 by company engineer Ernest E. Tompkins 9 years after the roughly contemporary Belgian Batima system and several years before the British Minibrix and the plastic bricks of Kiddicraft and Lego.

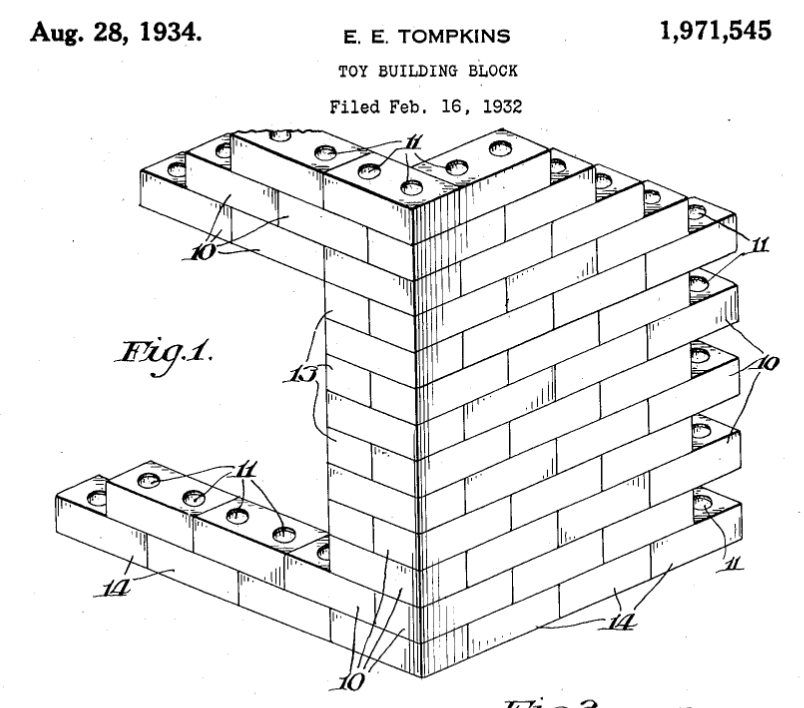
Figure 1 from US Patent 1,971,545 (1934), showing the toy building block system covered by Ernest E. Tompkins' 1932 patent application

== History ==
On February 16, 1932, Ernest E. Tompkins of Haverford, Pennsylvania, filed a United States patent application for a Toy building block on behalf of the Rubber Specialties Company Incorporated, a Delaware corporation based in Conshohocken, Pennsylvania. The patent was granted on August 28, 1934, and the company brought the system to market that year under the name Bild-O-Brik.

In January 1934, Tompkins filed a follow-up patent, "Model and toy building and construction elements therefor", which was granted in September 1935 and extended the system with additional shapes such as steps, rounded blocks, plates, wall-panel elements, and decorative objects including vases and lamps.

At least three numbered sets are documented (Nos. 501, 502, and 503), sold in boxes with printed building instructions for houses and other simple structures. Surviving examples indicate the bricks remained on the market at least into the 1940s.

== Construction and materials ==
Bild-O-Brik bricks were made of soft rubber and took the form of a rectangular prism whose length was twice its width and whose thickness was somewhat more than half its width. Each main brick had circular sockets in its top face and tapered, collared studs ("teats") protruding from its bottom face — the reverse arrangement of most later interlocking brick systems, where studs sit on top. The sockets carried a thin, rounded internal flange and the studs an enlarged, square-shouldered head, so that a stud snapped past the socket flange and was held by friction until deliberately pulled apart. Half-bricks were included for finishing straight wall edges, and starter bricks without studs served as a base layer.

== Significance ==
Bild-O-Brik's 1932 patent filing makes it one of the earliest documented stud-and-socket interlocking brick systems, alongside the Belgian Batima (patented 1923, using the thermoset plastic Galalith) and preceding the British Minibrix (introduced 1935) and the plastic systems of Kiddicraft (1939) and Lego (1949). Unlike Batima, whose studs served only for horizontal alignment, the Tompkins patent describes a genuine resilient snap-lock connection, an important step toward the clamping bricks used by later systems.

== See also ==
- Minibrix
- Batima
- Kiddicraft
- Bayko
- Building blocks (toy)
