= Building blocks (toy) =

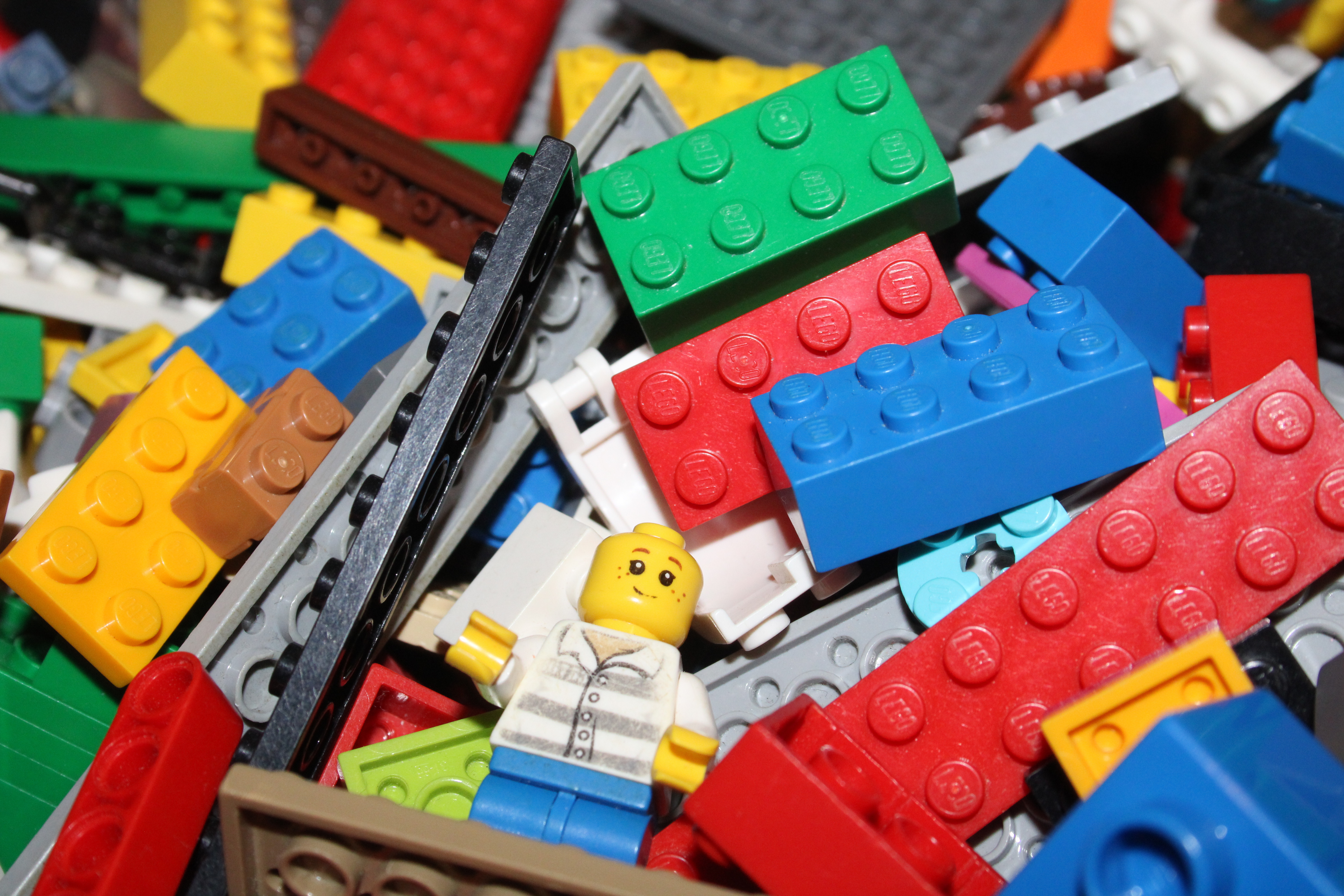
The Lego system is the most widely used clamp building block system in the world.

Building blocks (also construction blocks) are modular construction parts, usually made of plastic, which can be assembled in a form-fit manner. The basic components are usually cuboid-shaped, cylindrically studded at the top in a grid pattern, hollow-bodied at the bottom and smooth at the sides. The structured upper surface interacts by friction and positive locking with the correspondingly negative lower surface of other clamping components, so that complex designs can be assembled. The design allows the parts to be connected with compressive force and the blocks to be clamped with plastic pins.

== Characteristics ==
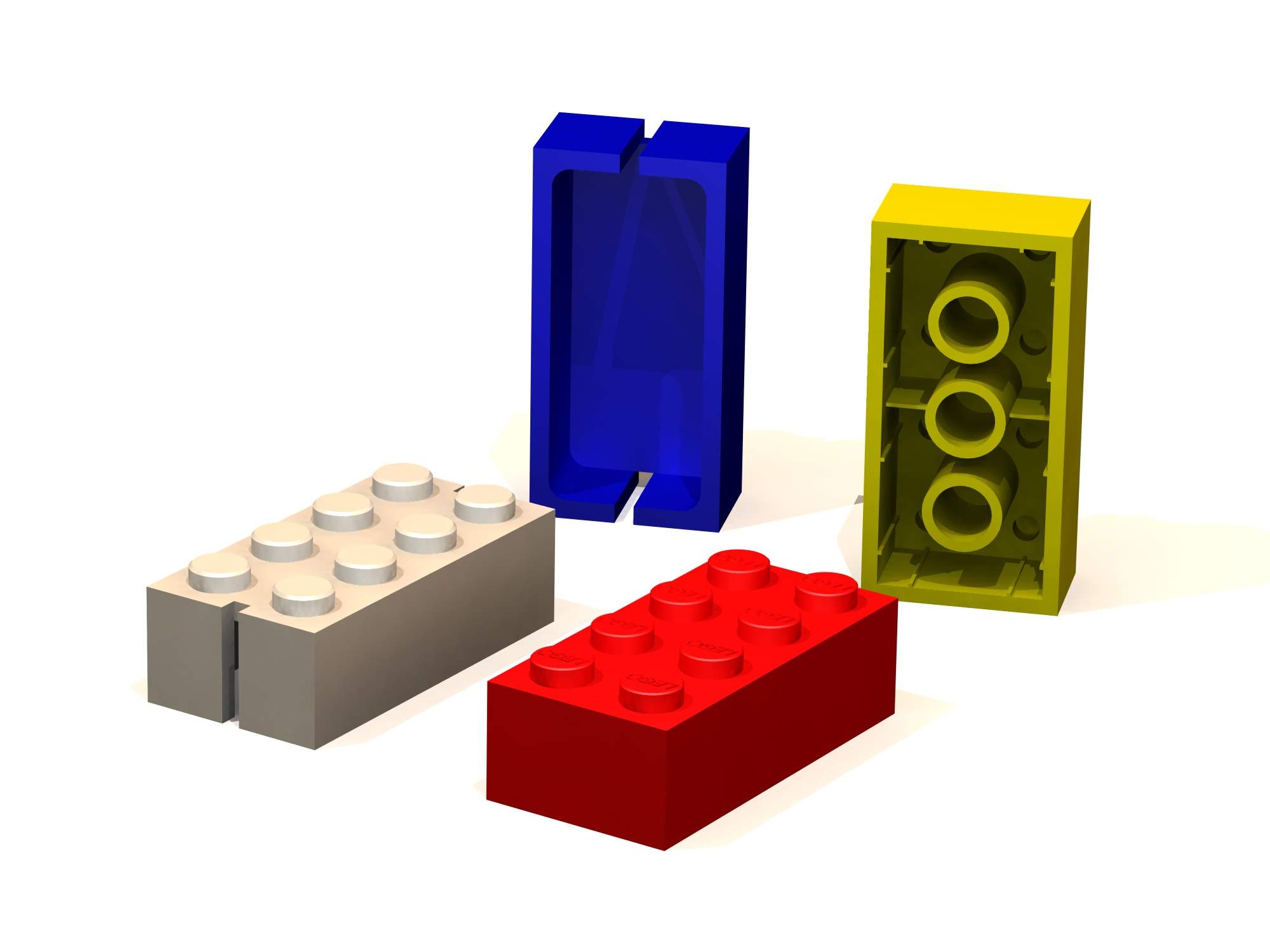
Kiddicraft and Lego building blocks in different colors

According to the systematics of science of play, most clamping building block systems belong to the game classification of educational toys or more specific construction toys. Characteristic features of building blocks are:

- modularity: According to the construction set principle, the whole can be divided into parts and reassembled along defined locations.
- Variability: as few as seven 4×2 bricks of the same color can be combined in over 85 billion ways.
- Recombinability: bricks can be arranged differently to each other again and again.

Desirable characteristics are:

- Fit: Tolerances of a few micrometers prevent jamming, stepping, or detectable gaps between bricks.
- Elasticity: By slightly deforming the stones during clamping, a permanent clamping or mechanical adhesive effect is achieved. The tiny difference in size between the nub and the stud receptacle must be compensated for elastically. However, some early building bricks were not designed to clamp together, rather relied upon gravity alone to hold structures together.
- Shape, color and thermostability: Despite the mechanical stress of the bricks, no plastic deformation or fracture should occur due to deformation or shock, neither function nor appearance should be diminished.
- Chemical stability: high resistance to weathering, natural ultraviolet and ionizing radiation.
- Wear resistance despite reversibility: clamp connections should be mechanically separable residue-free, with as little abrasion as possible.

The studs of clamping components initially hold in the other component by static friction, so called stiction, which is supported by plasticity of the selected material - it prevents them from simply slipping out of the other component again. In terms of clamping components, the force required to pull a stud out of its holder is also known colloquially as the "clamping force". Blocks from different manufacturers sometimes differ in this respect. The main force acting transversely to the studs is the form fit.

=== Delimitation ===
Compared to most ceramic or wooden kits, constructions can be created that can also withstand (to a limited extent) tensile forces. Compared to metal building sets or de:Metallbaukasten, however, building block sets have only weak cohesiveness, since they usually do not require special connectors; however, cohesiveness can be increased by form-fitting cross-connections. Metal construction sets are usually more room-forming and about linkage constructions.

=== Pedagogical Merit ===
The handling of building block toys requires and trains the visuomotor, the coordination of visual and haptic perception and the movement apparatus (eye-hand coordination, force dosage buildup), fine motor skills, color perception, spatial visualization ability and spatial cognition therein, and mental anticipation of action steps. It promotes creativity, imagination as well as the play instinct and serves as a self-efficacy experience. Motor skills, spatial visualization ability and spatial cognition are particularly stimulated when the size of the blocks allows for the building of life-sized objects. Large blocks also favor collaboration and team work.

== Material ==
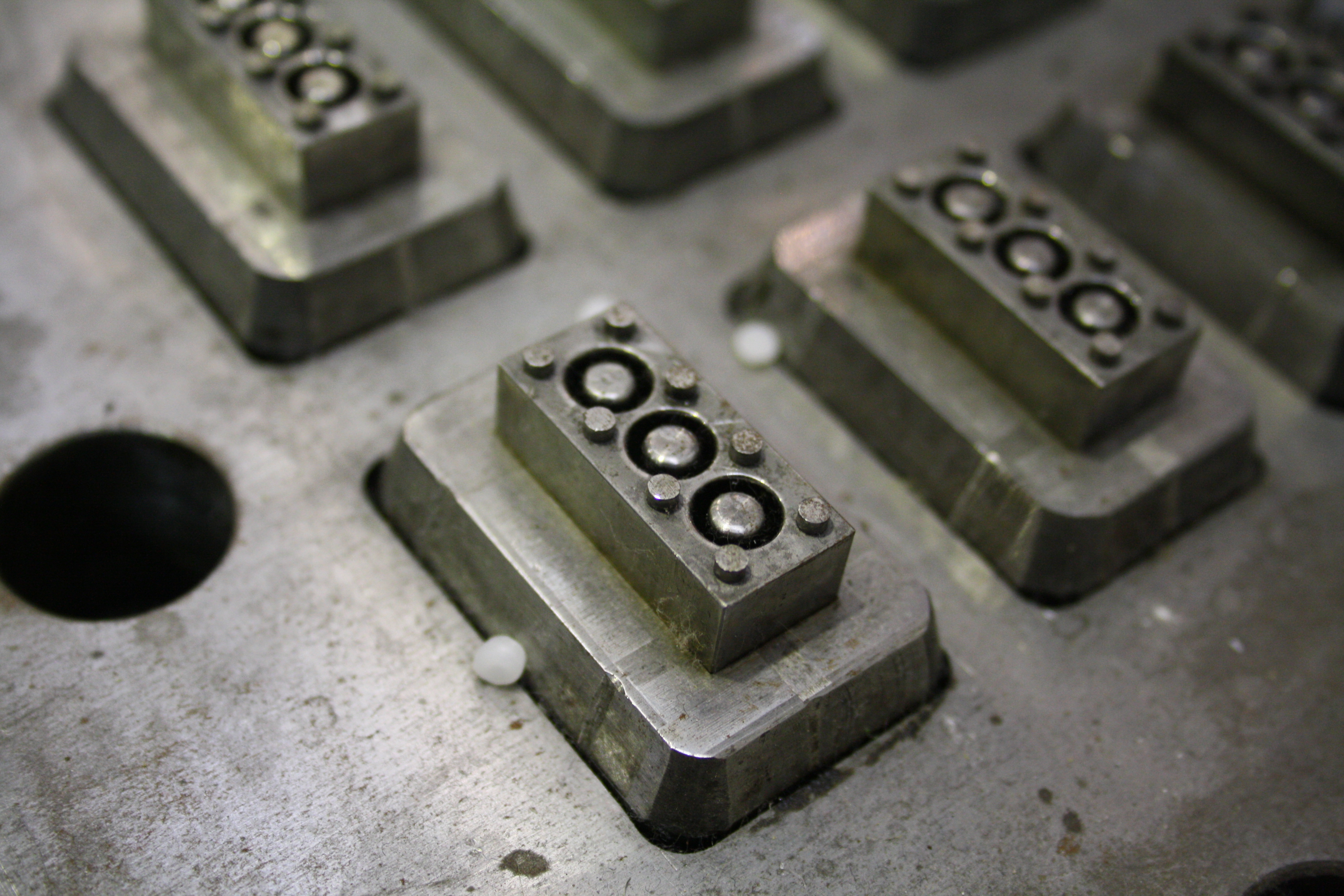
Injection mold for 4×2 Lego blocks

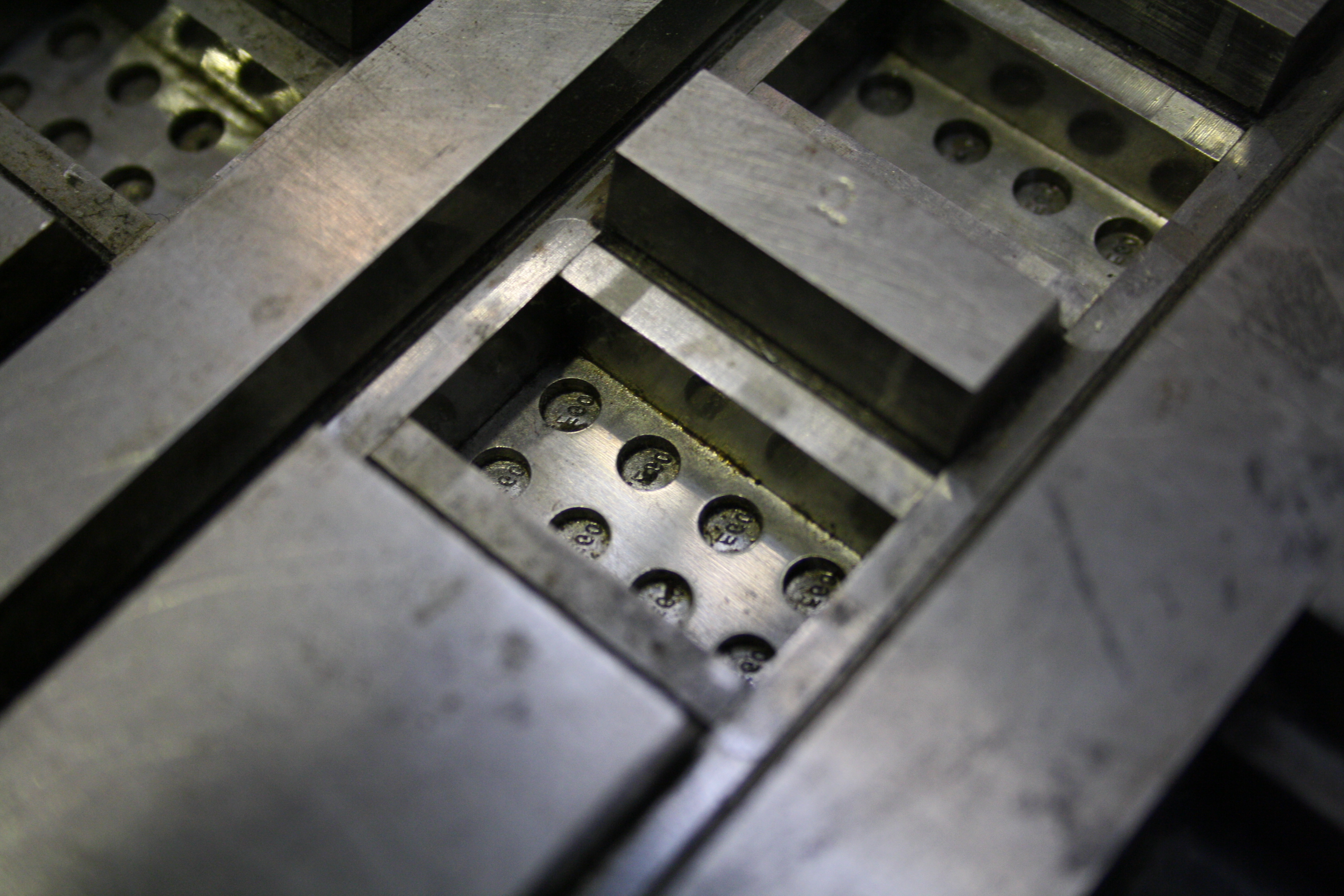
Injection mold top

Building blocks are almost always made from thermoplastic using the injection molding process. (For other materials, see chapter Sustainability.) The material of the building blocks must be elastic to compensate for the difference in size between the studs and the recess and to create a permanent clamping effect, while remaining dimensionally stable and unbreakable even with multiple disassembly and reassembly and mechanical stress like tensile or compressing loads. Surfaces should be smooth but grippy and have tolerances of only a few micrometers, as the top and bottom of the clamping components serve as plug-in socket for each other.

=== Lego ===
Lego initially used the material cellulose acetate, an acetate ester of cellulose. Since 1963, Lego bricks have been made of the plastic acrylonitrile-butadiene-styrene copolymer (ABS). Transparent building elements are made of polycarbonate ("Makrolon") and axles because of its higher rotational stiffness made of polyamide (PA). ABS has a low specific gravity with a density of 1.03 to 1.07 g-cm^{−3}. Thanks to its good resistance to impact, it is breaking strength, and a surface hardness of 50-60 hardness test by Shore makes it scratch-resistant to fingernails. The material is resistant to aqueous chemicals, but is unresistant to solvents such as acetone.

The plastic component tolerates heating up to a temperature of 80 °C and has good mechanical and acoustic damping properties. The amorphous thermoplastics are matt glossy, different colors are producible.

=== Sustainability ===
The polymer degradation of building blocks made from acrylonitrile-butadiene-styrene copolymer (ABS) can take between 100 and 1300 years in the ocean, depending on conditions, according to a University of Plymouth research finding, which is why some manufacturers are looking to switch to sustainable raw materials; some manufacturers make Lego-compatible bricks from wood, for example, from bioethanol or use resins from natural materials as a base, likewise, packaging is sometimes intended to become more environmentally friendly. There are also building blocks made of cardboard.

== History ==
In 1934, the Rubber Specialties Company in the United States started production of its Bild-O-Brik rubber system. From 1935 to 1976, the Premo Rubber Company manufactured the Minibrix. The system consisted of brown rubber blocks with a basic grid size of 1 by 1/2 by 3/8 inch (25 mm × 13 mm × 9.5 mm).

Beginning in 1939, Halsam Products manufactured its American Bricks from pressed wood. "ELGO Plastics, Inc. was established as a division of Halsam Products Company in 1941." It produced building blocks under the name American Plastic Bricks from 1946, and was the dominant American supplier through the 1950's. A full history of Halsam and its founders cites the existence of interlocking plastic bricks prior to LEGO in America.

In 1949, the Danish company Lego began industrial production of its Automatic Binding Brick, which, however, like its predecessors, was hollow inside and therefore produced very little adhesion. The bricks are an almost identical copy of the 1947 Self-locking Building Bricks of the English brand Kiddicraft by toy developer Hilary Page. In the 1997 publication Developing a Product, Lego explicitly refers to the origin of the building blocks:

Automatic Binding Bricks [...] were inspired by a couple of British plastic building bricks by the Kiddicraft company and sold only in Britain. [...] we modified the design of the brick [...]. The modifications [...] included straightening round corners and converting inches to cm and mm, which altered the size by approx. 0.1 mm in relation to the Kiddicraft brick. The studs on the bricks were also flattened in top.

— Maaike Lauwaert, Developing a Product. 1997.

== Possible combinations ==
Building blocks can be combined with each other in many ways. Two same-colored 4×2 bricks can be arranged in 24 ways, with three this is already 1560. The number of combinations increases to over 85 billion with only seven same-colored 4×2 bricks, as a paper from the Mathematics Department of Aarhus University states.

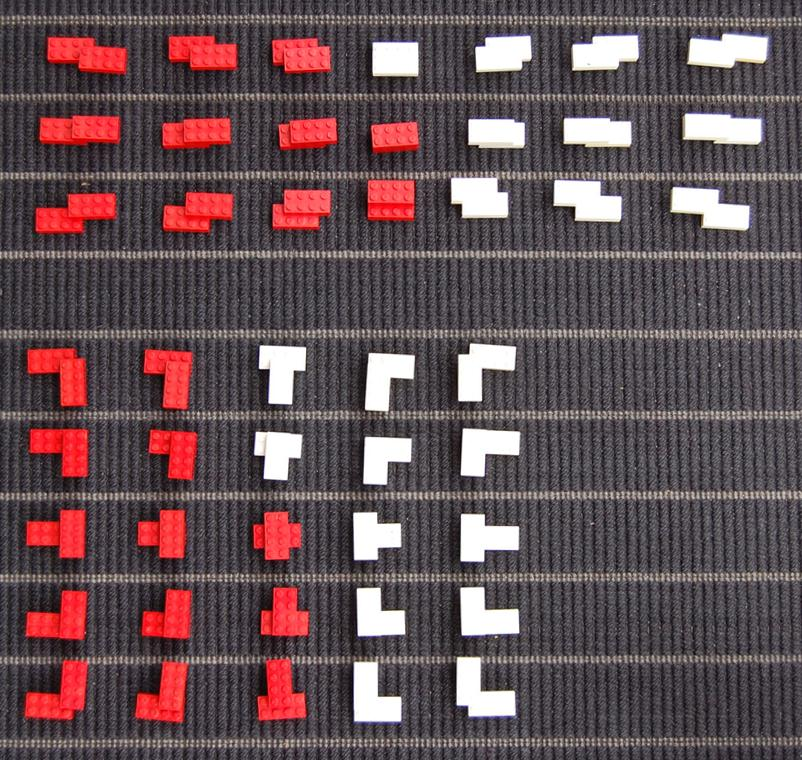
All 24 ways to arrange two 4×2 bricks of the same color. All white pairs are each already represented by one of the red pairs.

Amount of same colored 4×2-bricks	resulting possible combinations
1	1
2	24
3	1,560
4	119,580
5	10,116,403
6	915,103,765
7	85,747,377,755

== Models and manufacturers ==
Dimensions of the bricks according to Legosystem

The building blocks are usually sold in building block sets with building instructions, less often as single-variety or mixed bulk. In addition to the main model of a set, building instructions for an alternative model ("B-model") are occasionally included, often advertised as such ("2-in-1", "3-in-1"). Building blocks are produced in different shapes, sizes and systems worldwide by various manufacturers, with the majority of manufacturers following Lego's construction dimensions, a grid size of 8 × 8 mm (and other shape specifications), to keep their plug-in systems compatible. In addition to the standard shapes, most manufacturers produce special bricks onto which, in turn, bricks of the type described at the beginning can be placed or clamped.

Ready-to-assemble giant cardboard blocks have also recently appeared on the market: due to their size they are sold as flat cardboard sheets that are then assembled into big building blocks.

Some manufacturers concentrate on so-called MOCs ("My Own Creation"), which have been developed by brick fans and released or licensed for reproduction.

== Litigation for trademark protection ==
=== Lego system ===
The Lego company repeatedly sued competing building block manufacturers in court. The lawsuits were mostly unsuccessful, as the courts evaluated the functional design of the base brick as an issue of patent rather than trademark law, and all relevant Lego patents have expired. Lego itself largely adopted the dimensions of the bricks in the late 1940s from an invention by British toy developer Hilary Page.

Lego and Tyco Toys fought in U.S. courts over Tyco's interlocking bricks in the 1980s, with both manufacturers claiming victory. On August 31, 1987, a U.S. District Court ruled that Tyco could continue to manufacture Lego system-compatible bricks with the product name Super Blocks, but ordered Tyco to cease and desist from using the Lego trademark and from advertising with "Lego, but only cheaper". Lego's Hong Kong lawsuit against Tyco Super Blocks obtained an injunction forcing Tyco to stop making Lego-compatible bricks from after 1973. Tyco was also sued by Lego in Austria, Italy and Canada.

The Canadian manufacturer Mega Bloks was sued, Lego asserting that their use of the composite brick system of "studs and tubes" was an infringement of the trademarks held by Lego. On November 17, 2005, the Supreme Court of Canada upheld the right of Mega Bloks to continue selling the product in Canada. On November 12, 2008, the General Court (European Union) made a similar decision. On September 14, 2010, the European Court of Justice ruled that the eight-stud design of the original Lego brick "only fulfills a technical function [and] cannot be registered as a trademark" (regarding brick replica; however, it is still protected as a 3D trademark regarding advertising purposes/company logos and suchlike).

The English company Best-Lock Construction Toys sued Lego in German courts in 2004 and 2009. In the latter case, the German Federal Supreme Court rejected Lego trademark protection for the shape of its bricks.

In 2002, Lego's Swiss subsidiary Interlego AG successfully sued the company Tianjin CoCo Toy Co. Ltd. for copyright infringement. An appeals court found that many CoCo sets violated existing law. CoCo was ordered to stop manufacturing the infringing sets, publish a formal apology in the Beijing Daily, and pay a small compensation to Interlego. On appeal, the Supreme People's Court in Beijing upheld the court's ruling.

In 2000, Lego applied for a three-dimensional trademark for its minifigures, which Best Lock had already duplicated in 1998. Thus, Best Lock sued in 2012 to revoke the trademark. On June 16, 2015, the European Court of Justice upheld Lego's figure trademark. Lego had filed its copyright claims in a U.S. customs database in 2009, which led to the confiscation of Best Lock shipments from Asia. In October 2011, Lego filed a lawsuit in United States District Court in Hartford against Best-Lock over the minifigure trademark. Mega Bloks won a case in the EU Court of Justice in 2010 against Lego's trademark registration of a red toy brick.

Jon Capriola came up with the idea of a light-up brick called Laser Pegs in 2002, which was patented in 2006 and finally granted in 2009. Lawrence Rosen of LaRose Industries was approached by Capriola to invest in the company at the North American International Toy Fair in February 2011. Instead, Rosen applied for and received an accelerated patent in 2012, and LaRose Industries' Cra-Z-Art division then began producing Lite Brix light-up blocks. In 2013, Capriola's company sued Rosen for patent infringement, while Rosen filed for cancellation of his patent with the United States Patent and Trademark Office. In 2014, Light Stax was introduced as another LED light-compatible brick.

In 2011, Lego sued Guangdong Jumbo Grand Plastic Moulding Industrial for counterfeit packaging of BanBao. The two companies settled out of court, with Guangdong agreeing to issue standalone packaging and produce a new figure called ToBees.

In 2016, Lego announced that it would take legal action against Chinese manufacturer Guangdong Loongon, which produces the Lepin brand and is known for plagiarisms of Lego sets. In 2019, counterfeit Lego sets worth 26 million euros were seized in raids by Chinese police.

In 2021, Lego has obtained a cease-and-desist declaration in the German-speaking countries, according to which only original Lego bricks may also be called Lego. The cease-and-desist declaration argues that Lego is a wordmark. For many, however, Lego is a so-called deonym (word from a proper name or generalized brand name), i.e. (also) a generic name, which is to be prevented. The root cause can be found in the trademark act. Thus, for example, complex words have arisen in the German language that attempt to dignify the cease-and-desist declaration, which, however, is also understandable considering the history of the building block. Thus, it must be internalized that Lego is only a manufacturer of building blocks.

== See also ==
- Toy block

== Literature ==
- Harley, Basil (1990). Constructional Toys. Buckinghamshire: Shire Publications Ltd. p. 32. ISBN 978-0-7478-0081-1.
- Hammerl, Tobias (2018). LEGO: Bausteine einer volkskundlichen Spielkulturforschung [LEGO: Building blocks of a folkloristic play culture research]. Regensburger Schriften zur Volkskunde/Vergleichenden Kulturwissenschaft (in German). Vol. 34. Muenster: Waxmann. p. 354. ISBN 978-3-8309-3249-9.
- FB Arbeitslehre (2015-03-13). Die fachdidaktische Bedeutung von LEGO [The didactical importance of LEGO] (PDF) (in German). Berlin: Technische Universität Berlin. p. 34. (PDF; 3,3 MB)
- Kmiec, Pawel „Sariel" (2017). Das »inoffizielle« LEGO-Technic-Buch: Kreative Bautechniken für realistische Modelle [The "unofficial" LEGO Technic book: creative building techniques for realistic models] (in German). dpunkt.verlag. p. 428. ISBN 9783864904332.
