= Jakob Bengel =

German jewelry company

Jakob Bengel was a chain and costume jewelry factory, founded by Jakob Bengel in 1873 in Idar-Oberstein, Germany.

Until 1920, the company specialized in the production of watch chains and chatelaines (pendants for pocket watches). In the 1920s and 1930s, it became one of the leading manufacturers of fashion jewelry in the Art Deco style.

It was during the Bauhaus and Art Deco period that designers were looking to obtain new materials and inspiration to produce costume jewelry.

Inspired by French Avant-Garde and other fashion trendsetters such as Coco Chanel, Bengel started to produce experimental jewelry. The pieces, catalogued 1924–1939, combined brass and chrome with geometric shapes of colored galalith.
