= Minibrix =

Construction toy

Minibrix were construction kits manufactured from 1935 to 1976 in the UK. Developed in 1935, they enabled children to build their own miniature houses. Like the later and more famous construction toy, Lego, Minibrix consisted primarily of interlocking bricks with moulded studs on the surface, but being invented before the availability of modern plastics they were made of hard rubber which had the necessary ability to deform under pressure to allow firm interlocking of studs and holes. When new this rubber gave firm interlocking; but, as surfaces rubbed away, cohesion lessened until components held together mainly by gravity. [Cite: personal experience.]

Minibrix were made by the Premo Rubber Company which traditionally made rubber shoe heels. Premo was a subsidiary of the I.T.S. Rubber Company, which had been founded in 1919 by Arnold Levy, and was located at Sandringham Road, Petersfield, Hampshire, England.

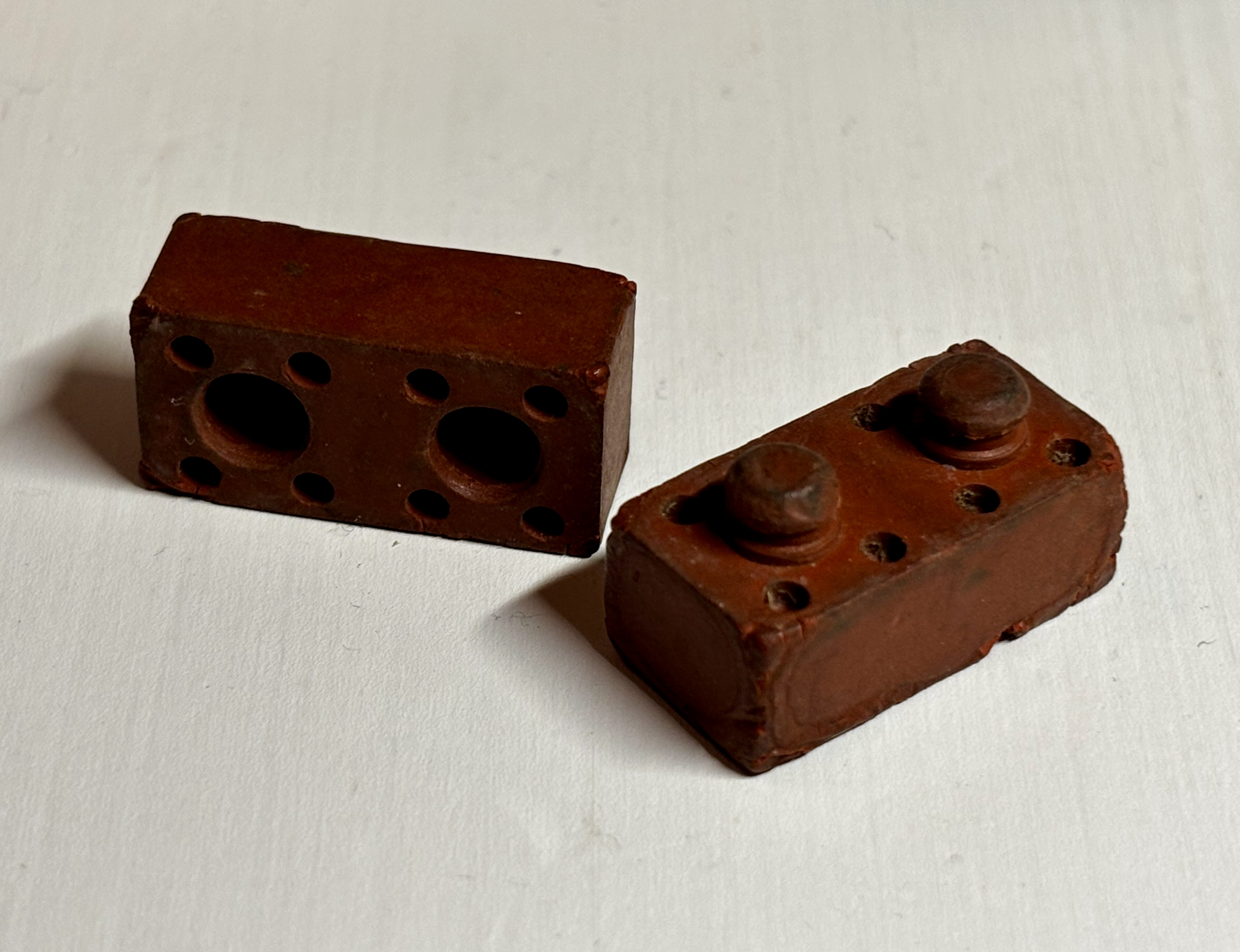
Typical Minibrix rubber brick

The origin of the Minibrix idea is unclear but Arnold may have seen the fibre-interlocking toy bricks of the early 1930s introduced by the Erector Company in America and the rubber interlocking bricks, called 'Bild-O-Brik' made in Pennsylvania, in 1934. However, the actual design of the British bricks and the other elements of the Minibrix system are thought to have been the work of a Mr Gilbert, an ITS engineer, and patents for the product were applied for on 5 July 1935 in the names of the Premo Rubber Company and Arnold Levy.

Two series of kits were available in different styles for making Tudor and Modern buildings, and the bases, roofs and lintels were all, like the bricks, made of rubber.

== See also ==
- Kiddicraft
- Erector set
- Lego
- Bayko
- Meccano
