= Form, fit and function =

Concept in design processes

Form, Fit, and Function (also F3 or FFF) is a concept used in various industries, including manufacturing, engineering, and architecture, to describe aspects of a product's design, performance, and compliance to a specification. F3 originated in military logistics to describe interchangeable parts: if F3 for two components have the same set of characteristics, i.e. they have the same shape or form, same connections or fit, and perform the same function, they can be substituted one for another. The idea behind F3 is to contractually require the original manufacturer to provide the customer (US government) with the free use of F3 data so that the customer can second source the part and thus enable competition between multiple suppliers. In practice, F3 is usually used not for final products (like entire weapon systems), but for the procurement of components and subsystems.

FFF refers to a set of characteristics or requirements that are essential for the design and compatibility of products, components, or systems, and can have legal considerations in regulated industries like aviation and defense (e.g., for technical data rights and configuration management).

The concept originates in the 1960s, and in some cases called "form-fit-function". The United States (US) Government formally recognized it in the legal incorporation of Public Law 98-525 regarding technical data and design changes. F3 can also refer to the ability of a replacement unit or technology upgrade to be compatible with existing systems, or be compatible with change control procedures (e.g., NASA's use in reliability via military standards).

== Alternate Uses ==
Some organizations have supplemental considerations for F3. The United States Navy has been using Form, Fit, Function, and Interface (F3I) since the 1970s, and NASA has published references to Form, Fit, Function, and Reliability to facilitate reliable designs.

== Definitions ==
=== In the Code of Federal Regulations - US Government ===
Form The form of a commodity is defined by its configuration (including the geometrically measured configuration), material, and material properties that uniquely characterize it. For software, the form means the design, logic flow, and algorithms.

Fit The fit of a commodity is defined by its ability to physically interface or connect with or become an integral part of another commodity. For software, the fit is defined by its ability to interface or connect with a defense article.

Function The function of a commodity is the action or actions it is designed to perform. For software, the function means the actions the software performs directly related to a defense article or as a standalone application.

== Sources ==
- Morris, R. (2009). The fundamentals of product design. AVA Publishing. ISBN 978-2-940373-17-8.
- Norman, D. (2002). The design of everyday things. New York: Basic Books. ISBN 0-465-06710-7.
- Deets, Douglas M. (1985). The use of form, fit, and function in the acquisition of major weapon systems (PDF) (Master's thesis). Monterey, California: Naval Postgraduate School.
