= Galalith =

Plastic made from casein

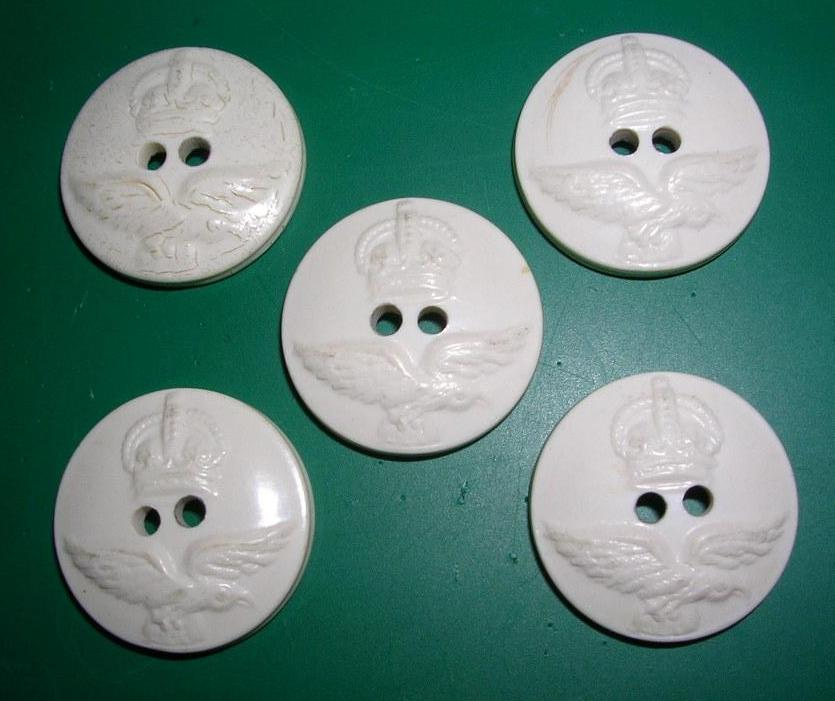
White galalith RAAF pre-1953 buttons. (Top left button shows crazing resulting from button having been heated during washing.)

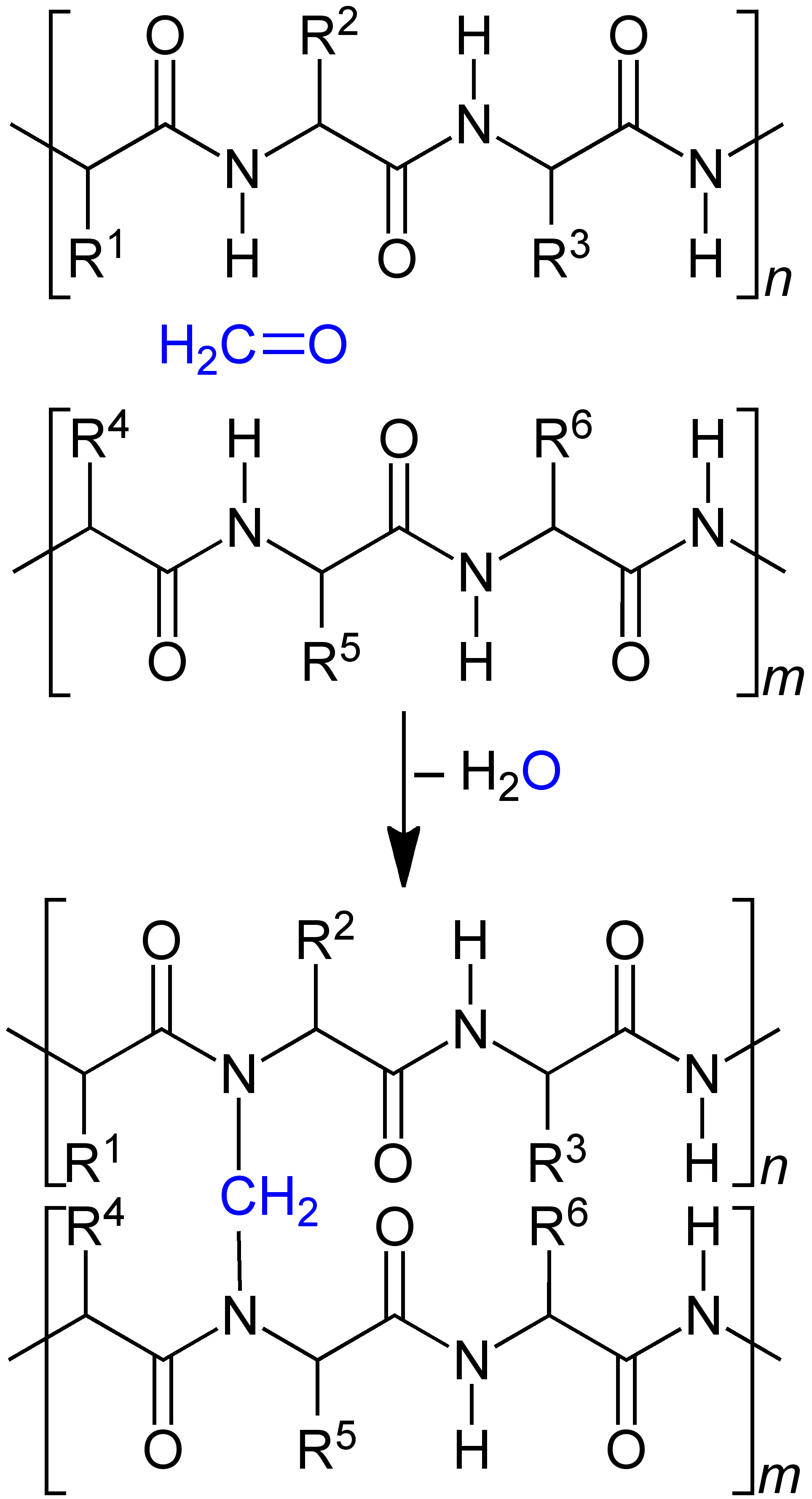
Chemical reaction of two proteins (top) with formaldehyde (H_{2}CO) – schematic presentation.

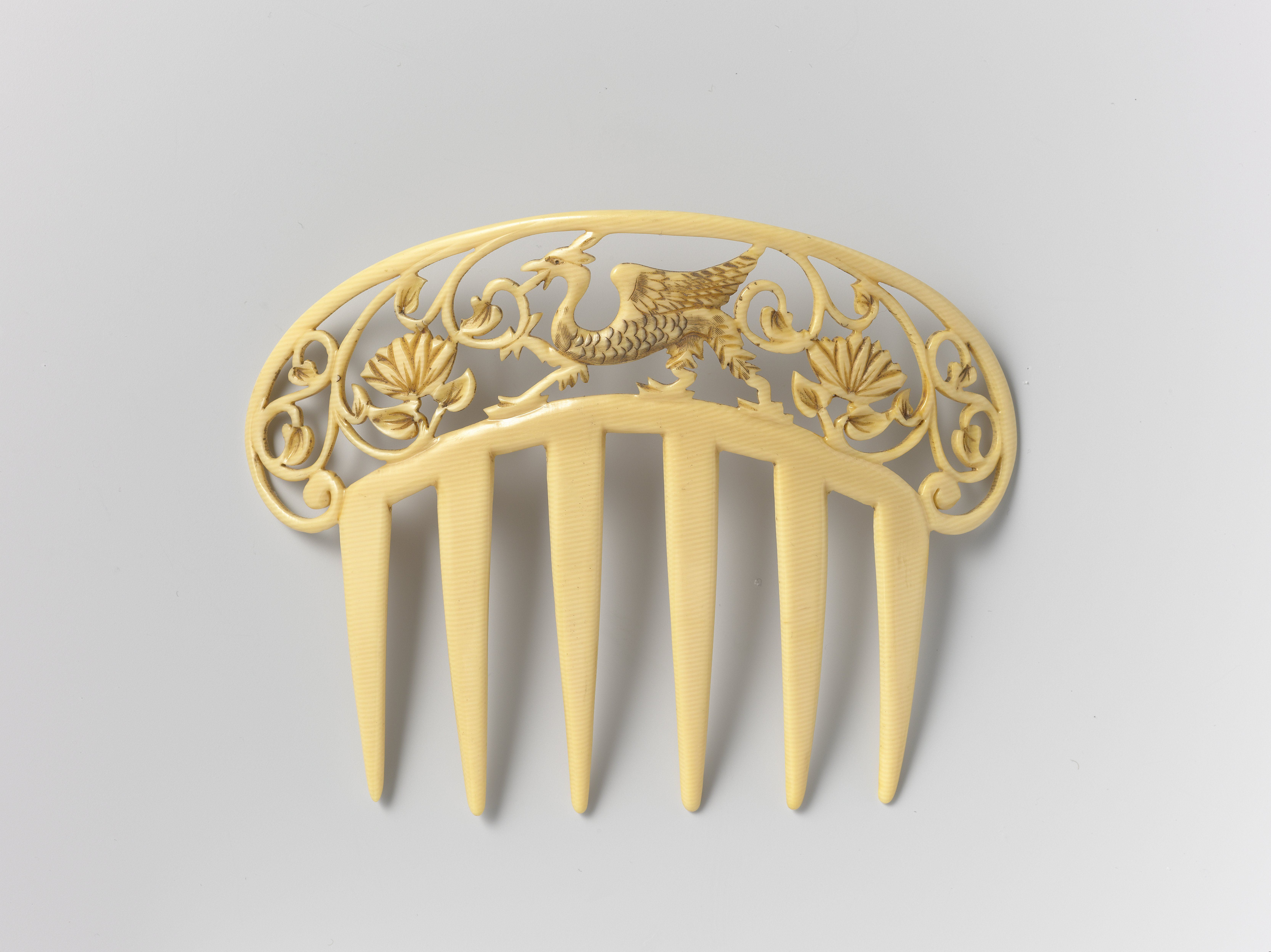
Comb made from Galalith resembling ivory

Galalith (Erinoid in the United Kingdom) is a synthetic plastic material manufactured by the interaction of casein and formaldehyde. The commercial name is derived from the Ancient Greek words gala (γάλα, "milk") and lithos (λῐ́θος, "stone"). It is odourless, hard, resists humidity to a certain degree, is antistatic, also an electrical insulator and virtually nonflammable. It was produced under a plethora of other commercial names such as aladdinite (in the US), Casolith (in the Netherlands) and lactoloid (in Japan).

== Discovery ==
In 1893, French chemist Auguste Trillat discovered the means to insolubilize (i.e., to make a substance incapable of being dissolved in a liquid, especially water) and harden considerably casein by immersion in formaldehyde, also preventing it from decomposing via micro-organisms and water like older 19th century "moldable casein" formulations preceding his discovery which had an extremely limited lifespan and low reliability overall due to lack of formaldehyde and using instead various stabilizing and preserving agents such as borax, various alkali salts and even lead based chemicals which revealed to be highly ineffective. The same year Trilliat produced viable samples for Huilliard company in their facilities in Suresnes, France, and later published the research leading to it (albuminoid materials reacted with formaldehyde, from 1888 to 1921), but said company disregarded these achievements and refused to produce the novel material. In 1897, Wilhelm Krische, a printer from Hanover, was commissioned to develop white, non-flammable, erasable chalkboards. He had difficulty in making the casein adhere to the supporting cardboard, and asked Swiss chemist (Friedrich) Adolph Spitteler (1846–1940) for help. The resultant horn-like plastic was unsuitable for the original purpose, but other applications were soon found. The name lactoform was originally proposed by the French, but the term galalith was kept.

== Production and usage ==
Galalith could not be moulded once set, so it had to be produced in sheets, but it had the advantage that it was inexpensive to produce. It could be cut, drilled, embossed and dyed without difficulty, and its structure could be manipulated to create a range of effects. One limitation on the uses of Galalith was that in thin sheets it could be slightly softened at 100 °C and cut with forms, but when made into items above a certain size it tended to splinter or warp. No other plastic at the time could compete on price, however, and with ivory, horn and bone products becoming far more expensive, it found a natural home in the fashion industry.

Usual industrial methods of fabrication followed these guidelines: sufficiently dried casein powder was mixed with coloring agents and various additives, but without formaldehyde. It was heated, agglomerated and pressed into thick elongated bars which were later extruded again under the action of heat. Said sticks were later aligned side by side in heated flat presses to form blocks that would be later be cut in sheets but bars or tubes were also produced. These shaped parts were then immersed in vats of formaldehyde for relatively long periods so as to ensure proper penetration of the product. Parts were then dried carefully to avoid checking, warping and cracking.

La Compagnie Française d'Exploitation des Procédés Pilatus in France used a peculiar process for their version called "primalithe" (Swiss patent by Pilatus) where casein powder was premixed with all the necessary additives and formaldehyde under vacuum, pressed to shape and later molded. Another French company, Etablissements Garaud in the Charente region, produced "isogalithe" using an unorthodox process where the casein was used as a moist fresh coagulated mass, not in the usual dried powder form preceding the pressing.

This new plastic was presented at Paris Universal Exhibition in 1900. In France, Galalith was distributed by the Compagnie Française de Galalithe located near Paris in Levallois-Perret. As a result, the Jura area became the first to use the material.

Galalith was marketed in boards, pipes and rods. In 1913, thirty million litres (eight million US gallons) of milk were used to produce Galalith in Germany alone. In 1914, Syrolit Ltd gained the license for manufacture in the United Kingdom. Renaming itself Erinoid Ltd., it started manufacture in the former Lightpill wool mill in Dudbridge, Stroud, Gloucestershire. Casein from rennet produces a superior plastic to acid-precipitated casein.

Galalith could produce gemstone imitations that looked strikingly real. In 1926, Gabrielle "Coco" Chanel published a picture of a short, simple black dress in Vogue. It was calf-length, straight, and decorated only by a few diagonal lines. Vogue called it "Chanel's Ford", as like the Model T, the little black dress was simple and accessible for women of all social classes. To accessorize the little black dress, Chanel revamped her designs, thus facilitating the breakthrough and mass popularity of costume jewelry. Galalith was used for striking Art Deco jewelry designs by artists such as Jakob Bengel and Auguste Bonaz, as well as for hair combs and accessories. By the 1930s, Galalith was also used for knitting needles, pens, umbrella handles, white piano keys (replacing natural ivory), and electrical goods, with world production at that time reaching 10,000 tons.

== Modern use ==
Although Galalith was historically cheap, the fact it could not be moulded and its inherent flaws, being one of the first man-made plastics, led to its demise by commercial end users. Production slowed as the restrictions of World War II led to a need for milk as a food, and due to new oil-derived wartime plastic developments. Production continued in Brazil until the 1960s. In the UK production continued until 1980 as part of the many plastic products manufactured by BP.

Nowadays Galalith still continues to be produced in small quantities, mainly for buttons, board game pieces, musical instrument accessories (plectrums, guitar tuner rollers and peg buttons for example) and turned pens amongst other niche applications.

== See also ==
- Bakelite
