= Hilary Page =

English toy maker

- Born: Hilary Fisher Page; 20 August 1904; Sanderstead, England
- Died: 24 June 1957 (aged 52)
- Other name: Harry
- Occupation: Toy maker
- Known for: Inventing Self-Locking Building Bricks

Hilary "Harry" Fisher Page (20 August 1904 – 24 June 1957) was an English toy maker and inventor of Self-Locking Building Bricks, the predecessor of Lego bricks. He founded the Kiddicraft toy company.

== Early life ==
Hilary "Harry" Fisher Page was born on 20 August 1904 in Sanderstead, England. He was the first child of Samuel Fisher and Lillian Maude Page. As a child he made his own wooden toys and invented games supported by his father who worked in the lumber trade.

Page was educated at Shrewsbury School from 1918 to 1923, where he began to display his entrepreneurial skills. Interested in photography, he set up a business developing photos for the other students. After his formal education he worked in the timber trade, like his father, for several years and in 1929 married Norah Harris, a long-time friend of the family. The couple's only daughter was born in 1932. Together with his second wife Oreline he adopted twin girls in 1946.

== Kiddicraft ==
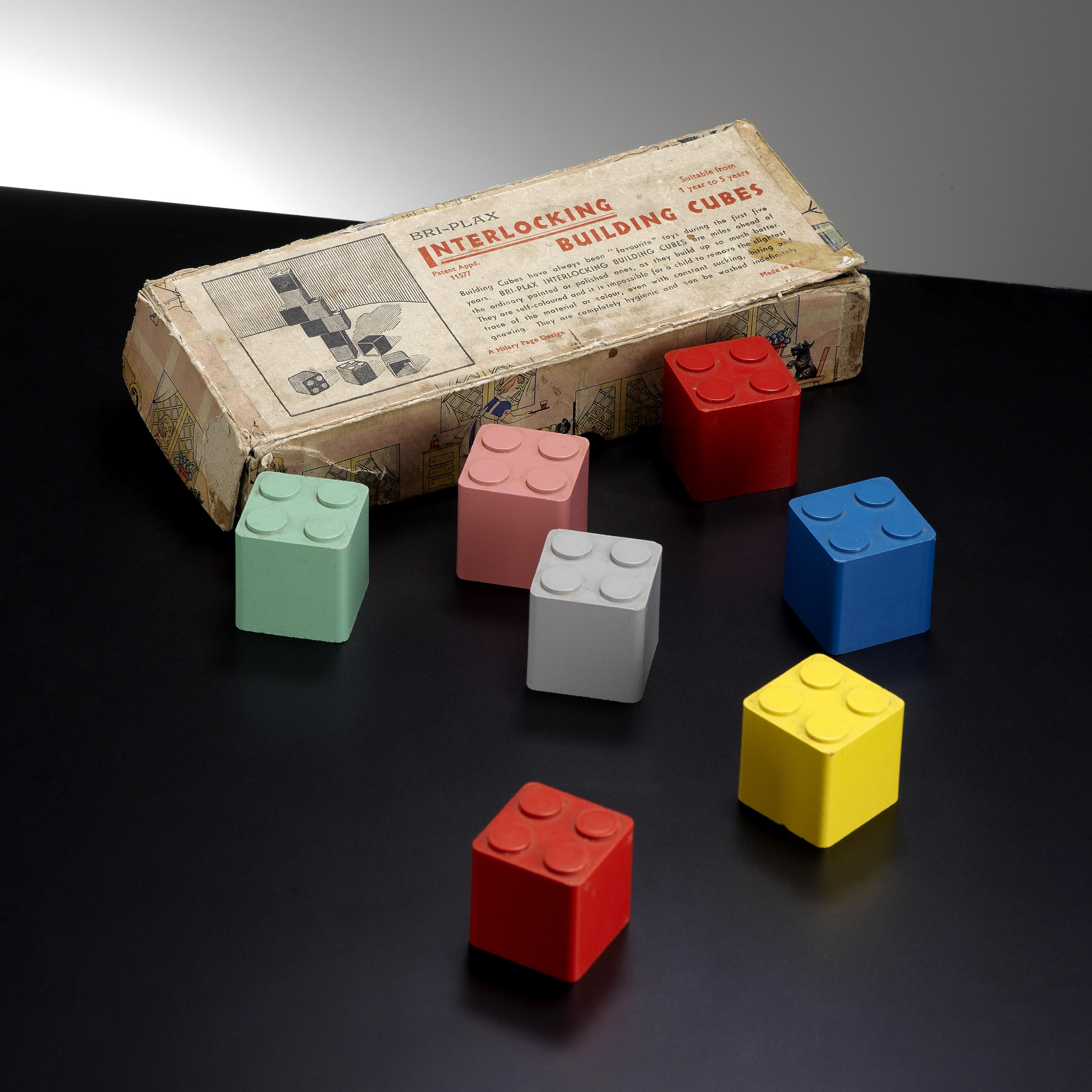
Bri-Plax Interlocking Building Cubes

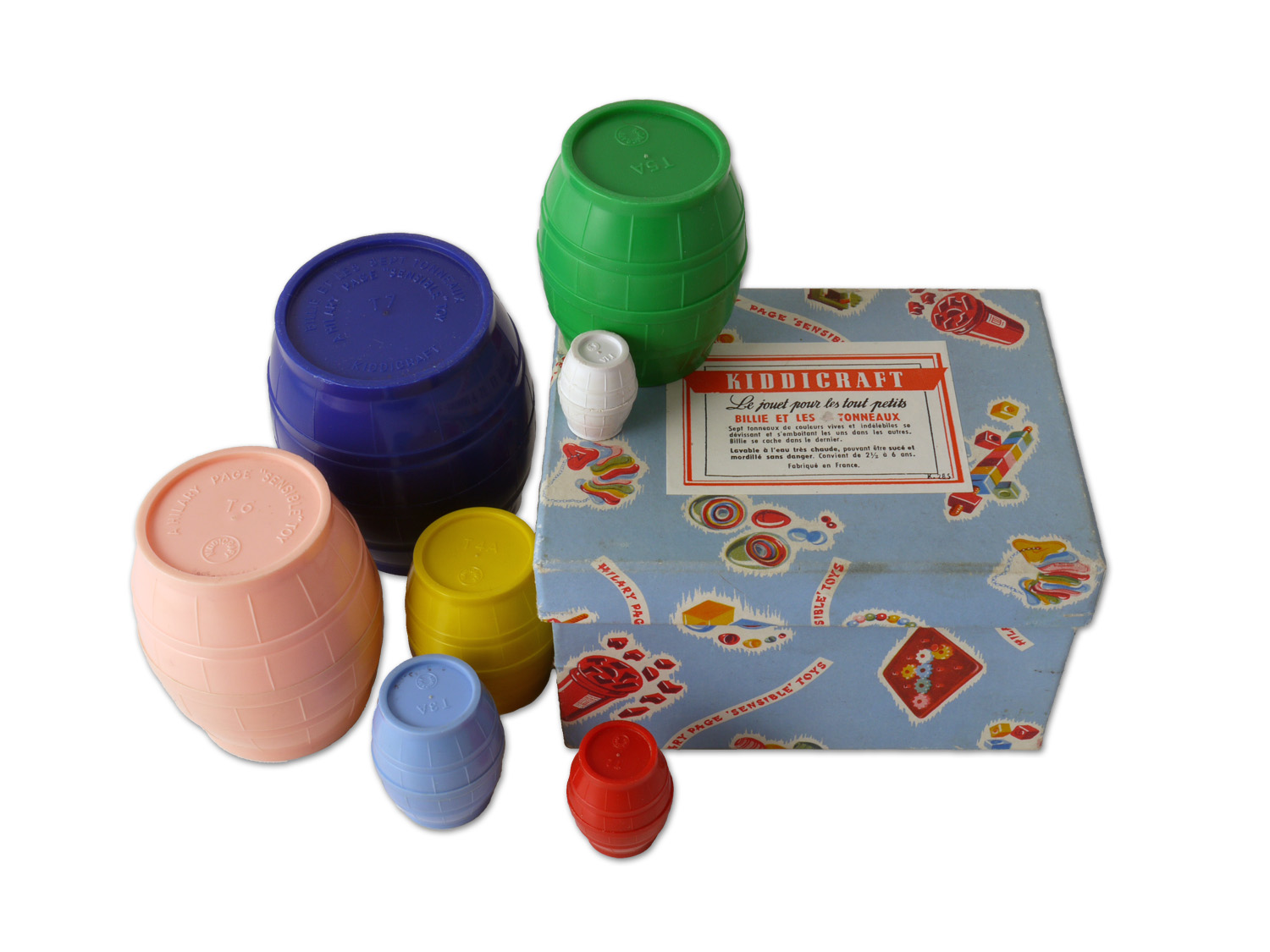
Kiddicraft plastic toys

Page, along with several partners, founded the toy company Kiddicraft in 1932, opening a small toy shop in Purley, Surrey. Increasingly favouring plastic over wood for children's toys, he began manufacturing "Sensible" toys using injection moulding from 1936, and in 1939 patented the Kiddicraft Self-Locking Building Bricks, first marketed in 1947.

Many of Page's early "Sensible" plastic toys were reinterpretations of traditional wooden nursery toys he had previously imported from Russia, such as stacking rings and nesting dolls. Rendered in brightly coloured, washable plastic, these became lines including Pyramid Rings (a stacking-ring toy), Building Beakers (nesting and stacking cups), and Billie and his Seven Barrels; the style has been described as anticipating the stacking-ring toys later popularised by Fisher-Price.

These bricks have been described as the "original Lego": Ole Kirk Christiansen and his son Godtfred became aware of the Kiddicraft brick and in 1949 marketed their own version, the Automatic Binding Brick, which became the Lego brick in 1953. Lego acknowledges Kiddicraft as the origin of the plastic bricks on its history website, and purchased the residual rights to the Kiddicraft designs from Page's descendants in 1981. For the company's subsequent history under Hestair Group and Fisher-Price ownership, and the 2022 trademark re-registration, see Kiddicraft.

== Research and publications ==
After founding Kiddicraft, Page spent several years studying early childhood play, in what has been described as one of the first systematic applications of child psychology to toy design. He conducted his research by spending a day each week playing with children in different nursery schools, observing first-hand which toys held their interest. This research culminated in 1938 in the publication of his book Playtime in the First Five Years, which presented toys as educational tools supporting a child's development, describing them as "tools of childhood". A second edition followed in 1953; the book was distributed internationally through Kiddicraft's overseas representatives, and a presentation copy given to Australian prime minister Robert Menzies by the company's Australian representative survives in the Robert Menzies Institute's collection.

== Death ==
Troubled by pressures on the business and fearing a collapse of his company, Page died by suicide on 24 June 1957. In 1987, his widow stated, "He died before Lego brought out the product in Britain. He didn't know about it."

== Posthumous recognition ==
Page was recognised as an innovator in child education and toy design in 2007 with a Lifetime Achievement Award from the British Toy and Hobby Association.
