= Kiddicraft =

British toy company, precursor of Lego bricks

- Industry: Toys
- Founded: 1932
- Founder: Hilary Page
- Defunct: 2001 (original brand); trademark re-registered 2022
- Headquarters: Purley, Surrey, United Kingdom
- Products: Plastic construction toys, infant and toddler toys
- Owner: Hilary Page (1932-1957); Hestair Group (1957-1989); Fisher-Price (1990-2001); Thorsten Klahold / Dark Side Bricks GmbH (since 2022)

Kiddicraft was a British toy company and brand, founded in 1932 by Hilary Page, historically regarded as a pioneer of modern interlocking brick toys. The plastic building bricks developed and produced under the Kiddicraft name are considered a direct precursor of Lego bricks.

== History ==
=== Founding and early years (1932–1946) ===
Hilary Page, along with several partners, founded Kiddicraft in 1932, opening a small toy shop on Godstone Road in Purley, Surrey. Page originally imported wooden toys from Russia before introducing his own designs. Increasingly unhappy with wood as a material for children's toys, Page became an early advocate of plastic as a safe and hygienic alternative. In 1936 he began manufacturing "Sensible" toys using the then-new injection moulding process, based on developmental observations he had made in nursery schools. In 1937 these were also sold under the Bri-Plax brand through a newly formed company, British Plastic Toys Ltd.

One of the earliest products still in production in a similar form today is the "Building Beakers" stacking cup set (item K2), which Page designed in 1937 as a colourfast, hygienic alternative to the painted wooden matryoshka dolls common at the time. The basic stacking-cup design later became a de facto industry standard and remains in near-unchanged form in the ranges of numerous manufacturers, for instance IKEA's MULA series.

In 1939 Page filed the patent for the Kiddicraft "Self-Locking Building Bricks" (British patent no. 529,580), which was granted in 1940. A further key patent for the plastic bricks was filed in 1945 and granted in 1949 (GB633055A). The bricks' dimensions corresponded to a British standard brick scaled down 1:7. The plastic bricks reached the market in 1947.

From the 1940s, Kiddicraft expanded its range with the "Kiddicraft Miniatures", scaled-down replicas of everyday consumer products (mostly from the British market) designed primarily for pretend-shop play. The line was an early example of licensed product marketing: in cooperation with well-known manufacturers such as Nestlé and Kellogg's, their products were reproduced as realistic plastic miniatures.

=== The Self-Locking Building Brick ===
Post-WWII, Page designed and produced the Kiddicraft Self-Locking Building Bricks, which have been described as the "original Lego". Kiddicraft released a series of building sets that Lego later copied in both style and content. The bricks could be stacked and were held in place by studs on top, later featuring side slits that allowed panel-like doors, windows, or cards to be inserted. Page patented the basic 2x4 studded brick design in 1947, followed by patents for the side slits (1949) and the baseplate (1952); examples are held at the Brighton Toy and Model Museum.

The Self-Locking Building Brick sets were first marketed in 1947; as a promotion, Page and his family built large display models for the 1947 Earl's Court Toy Fair. The Victoria and Albert Museum of Childhood in London lists the bricks among the "must-have toys" of the 1940s.

=== Relationship with Lego ===
Ole Kirk Christiansen and his son Godtfred became aware of the Kiddicraft brick after examining a sample, and possibly drawings, given to them by the British supplier of the first injection moulding machine they had purchased. Ole copied the Kiddicraft brick and in 1949 marketed his own version, the Automatic Binding Brick, which became the Lego brick in 1953. Lego acknowledges Kiddicraft as the origin of the plastic bricks on its history website, and states that when Lego was contacted by Kiddicraft in the late 1950s, Kiddicraft raised no objection to the Danish company manufacturing similar bricks; Lego eventually purchased the residual rights to the Kiddicraft designs from Hilary Page's descendants in 1981, ahead of legal suits it filed against other plastic building toy makers such as Tyco. British Lego Ltd. was set up in late 1959 and its first sets were sold the following year, three years after Page's death.

=== Ownership change and Hestair Group (1957–1989) ===
After Hilary Page's death in 1957, management of the company passed to David Day, while Page's widow Oreline remained a director. During this period the brand increasingly focused on the pre-school toy market.

In 1977 the company was sold to the Hestair conglomerate, trading thereafter as Hestair-Kiddicraft. Under the new ownership, classic designs continued to be produced alongside new product lines, largely shaped by David Day. A pivotal year for the brand was 1981: amid a legal dispute with competitor Tyco, the Lego group purchased all remaining patents and rights to the Kiddicraft designs from Hestair-Kiddicraft for £45,000, securing its own legal position internationally, particularly in the ongoing Tyco litigation. The Kiddicraft trade mark itself, however, remained with Hestair according to EUIPO records.

=== Continental European licensees and "Phase Bébé Kiddicraft" (1958–1989) ===
Following Page's death, Kiddicraft's focus increasingly shifted from the original building-set systems towards higher-end developmental toys for infants and toddlers. In 1953/54, "Kiddicraft Deutschland, Kurt Molineus KG" was founded and, after a slow start, successfully sold the relatively high-priced Kiddicraft products on the West German market. In 1958 Kiddicraft Deutschland merged with the French brand Bébé-Confort Sarl (today part of Dorel Industries), forming "Bébé-Confort Deutschland GmbH & Co. KG", in which Bébé-Confort Sarl held a 55% majority stake. Through the 1970s and 1980s, in cooperation with the French toy firm Bébé/Minitoy (run by Philippe Mayer, a long-time friend and business partner of Page) and German businessman Kurt Molineus, the brand experienced a second period of considerable international recognition under the name "Bébé Kiddicraft", chiefly shaping the continental European and West German markets. Molineus ended the cooperation with Bébé Confort around 1973-74 after disagreements over the future direction of the product lines, which he believed needed to change in response to demographic shifts in West Germany. A separate licensee in Spain, Juguetes Racionales, was formed around 1955 by two Spanish business partners of Philippe Mayer; it paid royalties to Kiddicraft, assembled the toys in a small factory near San Sebastián and distributed them throughout Spain until approximately 1975.

=== Fisher-Price acquisition and later trademark history (1990–2022) ===
In the early 1990s (around 1989-90), Kiddicraft was acquired by the American toy company Fisher-Price (later part of Mattel). The "Phase Bébé" branding was gradually discontinued and the range folded into Fisher-Price's global portfolio; many original Kiddicraft designs nonetheless survived under the new brand name and continued to influence the design of modern toddler toys. Fisher-Price used the Kiddicraft name without reference to the original interlocking-brick system, and the company finally let the trademark lapse in 2001. The original UK wordmark "KIDDICRAFT." had been registered with the UK Intellectual Property Office as early as 24 April 1940 (trade mark UK00000611582), remaining in force until it lapsed in 2013/2014.

After the trademark had lain unused for two decades, it was re-registered in 2022 by Thorsten Klahold, a German toy retailer and YouTuber known as Johnny's World. Following a 2021 trade-mark dispute over figures included in imported Qman play sets, which Klahold lost, he developed his own figure design, for the marketing of which the Kiddicraft trademark was newly registered. The brand today belongs to the German company Dark Side Bricks GmbH.

== Legacy ==
Kiddicraft's Self-Locking Building Bricks are widely regarded by toy historians as the direct design ancestor of the Lego brick, and the brand's early "Building Beakers" stacking-cup design and "Kiddicraft Miniatures" licensed-product toys are cited as pioneering examples of mid-20th-century plastic toy design.

== See also ==
- Lego
- Hilary Page
- Construction set
