= Lego =

Plastic construction toy

- Logo used since 1998
- Type: Construction set
- Invented by: Ole Kirk Christiansen
- Company: The Lego Group
- Country: Denmark
- Availability: 1949–present
- Materials: Acrylonitrile butadiene styrene
- lego.com

Lego (/ˈlɛɡoʊ/, LEG-oh; Danish: [ˈle̝ːko]) is a brand of plastic construction toys manufactured by the Lego Group, a privately held company based in Billund, Denmark. Lego consists of variously coloured interlocking plastic bricks made of acrylonitrile butadiene styrene (ABS) that accompany an array of gears, figurines called minifigures, and various other parts. Its pieces can be assembled and connected in many ways to construct objects, including vehicles, buildings, and working robots. Assembled Lego models can be taken apart, and their pieces can be reused to create new constructions.

Inspired by the self-locking bricks invented by English toymaker Hilary Page in 1939 which were produced by his company Kiddicraft, the Lego Group began manufacturing the interlocking toy bricks in 1949. Moulding is done in Denmark, Hungary, Mexico, China, Vietnam and the United States. Brick decorations and packaging are done at plants in the former three countries and in the Czech Republic. Annual production of the bricks averages approximately 36 billion, or about 1140 elements per second. One of Europe's biggest companies, Lego is the largest toy manufacturer in the world by sales. As of July 2015, 600 billion Lego parts had been produced.

Lego maintains a large fan community based around building competitions and custom creations, and a range of films, games, and ten Legoland amusement parks have been developed under the brand.

== History ==
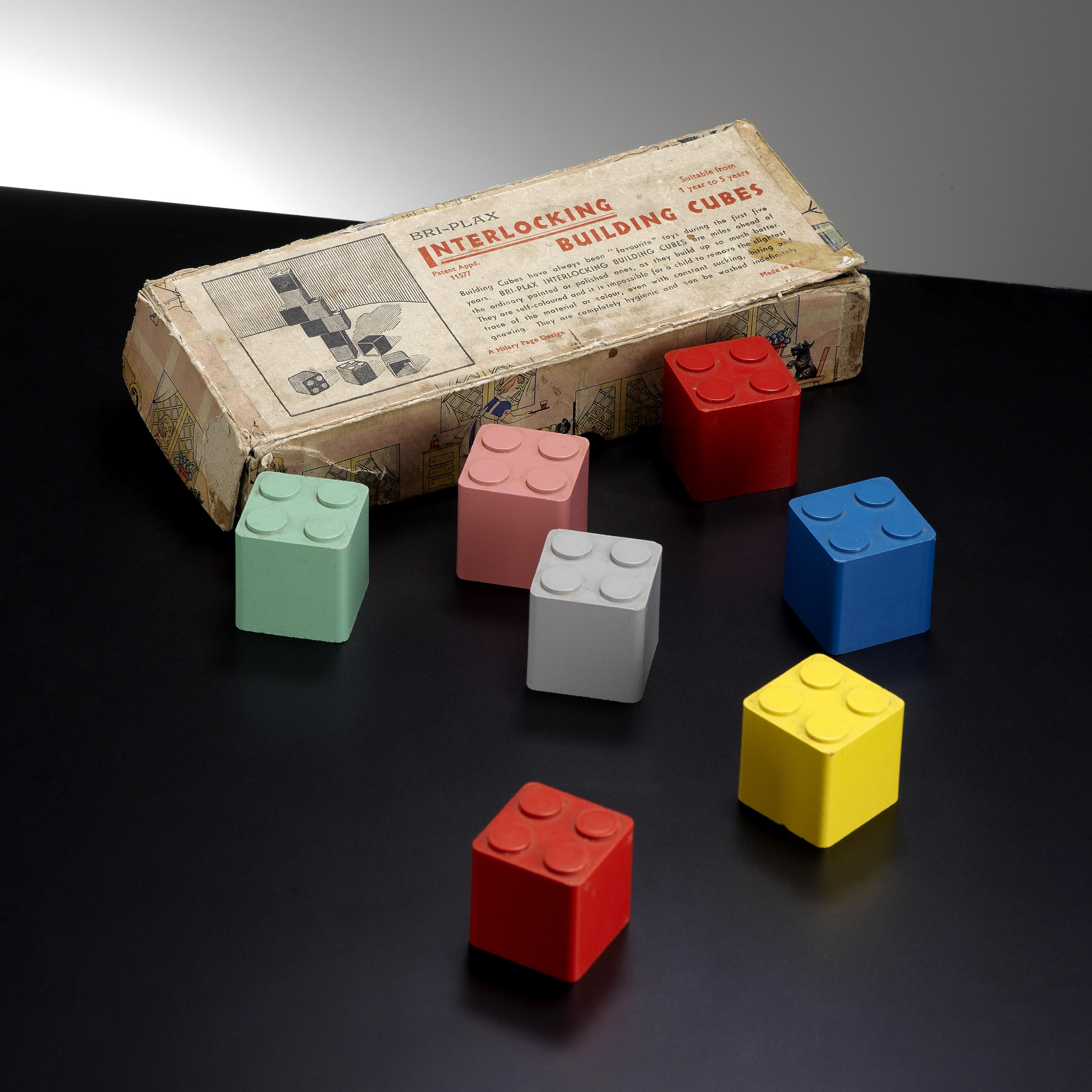
Hilary Fisher Page's Interlocking Building Cubes by Kiddicraft, 1939

The Lego Group began in the workshop of Ole Kirk Christiansen (1891–1958), a carpenter from Billund, Denmark, who began making wooden toys in 1932. In 1934, his company came to be called "Lego", derived from the Danish phrase leg godt [lɑjˀ ˈkʌt], which means 'play well'. In 1947, Lego expanded to begin producing plastic toys. In 1949, the business began producing an early version of the now familiar interlocking bricks, calling them "Automatic Binding Bricks". These bricks were based on the Kiddicraft Self-Locking Bricks, invented by Hilary Page in 1939 and patented in the United Kingdom in 1940 before being displayed at the 1947 Earl's Court Toy Fair. Lego had received a sample of the Kiddicraft bricks from the supplier of an injection-moulding machine produced in Windsor, England, that it had purchased. The bricks, originally manufactured from cellulose acetate, were a development of the traditional stackable wooden blocks of the time. In 1981, Lego reached an out-of-court settlement with Page's estate, reportedly for around £45,000, for continued use of the brick design; this did not include the Kiddicraft trademark, which was later sold separately to Fisher-Price.

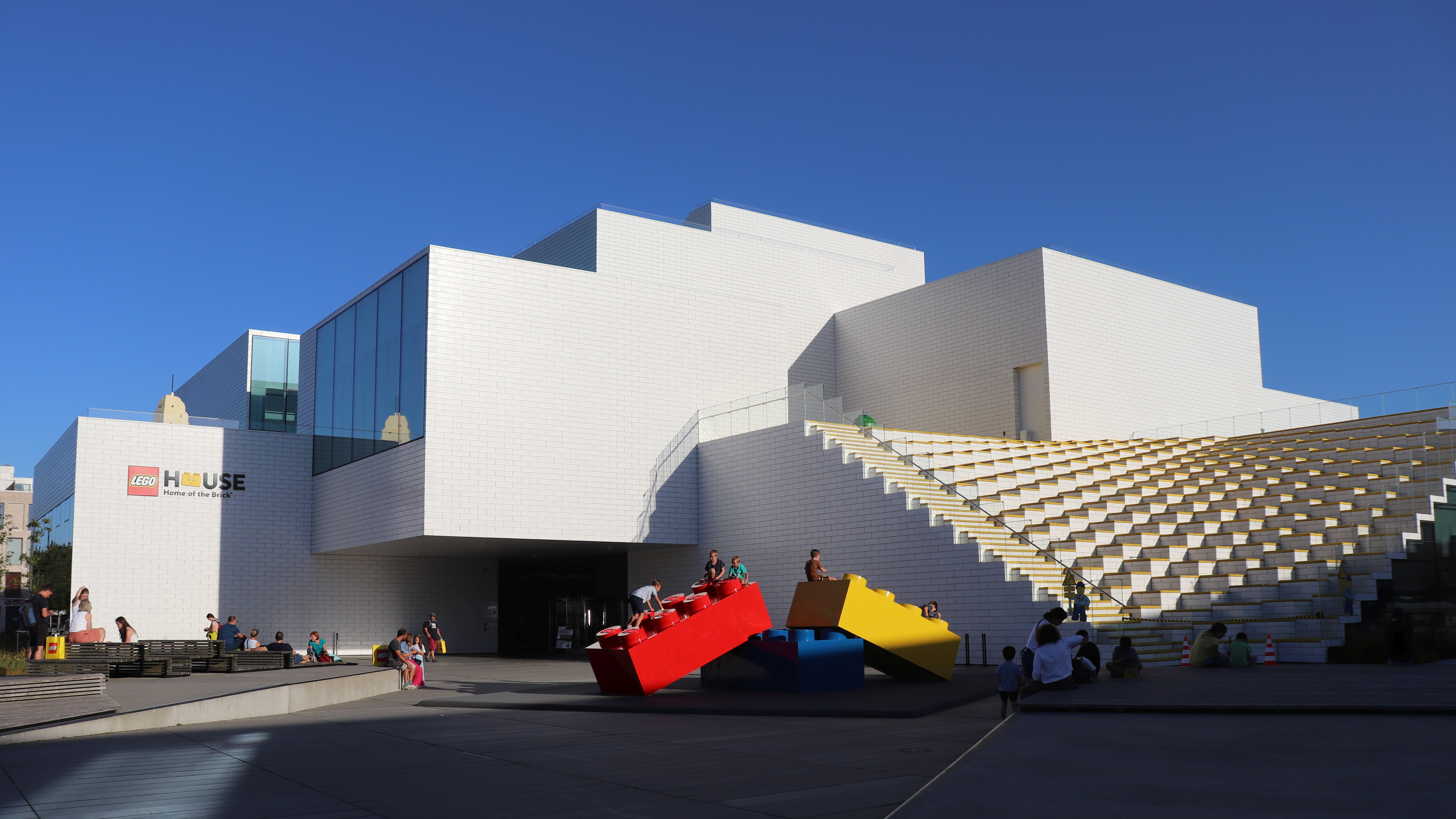
The Lego House, headquarters of the Lego Group in Billund, Denmark

The Lego Group's motto, "only the best is good enough" (Danish: det bedste er ikke for godt, literally "the best isn't excessively good") was created in 1936. Christiansen created the motto, still used today, to encourage his employees never to skimp on quality, a value he believed in strongly. By 1951, plastic toys accounted for half of the company's output, even though the Danish trade magazine Legetøjs-Tidende ("Toy Times"), visiting the Lego factory in Billund in the early 1950s, wrote that plastic would never be able to replace traditional wooden toys. Although a common sentiment, Lego toys seem to have become a significant exception to the dislike of plastic in children's toys, due in part to the high standards set by Ole Kirk.

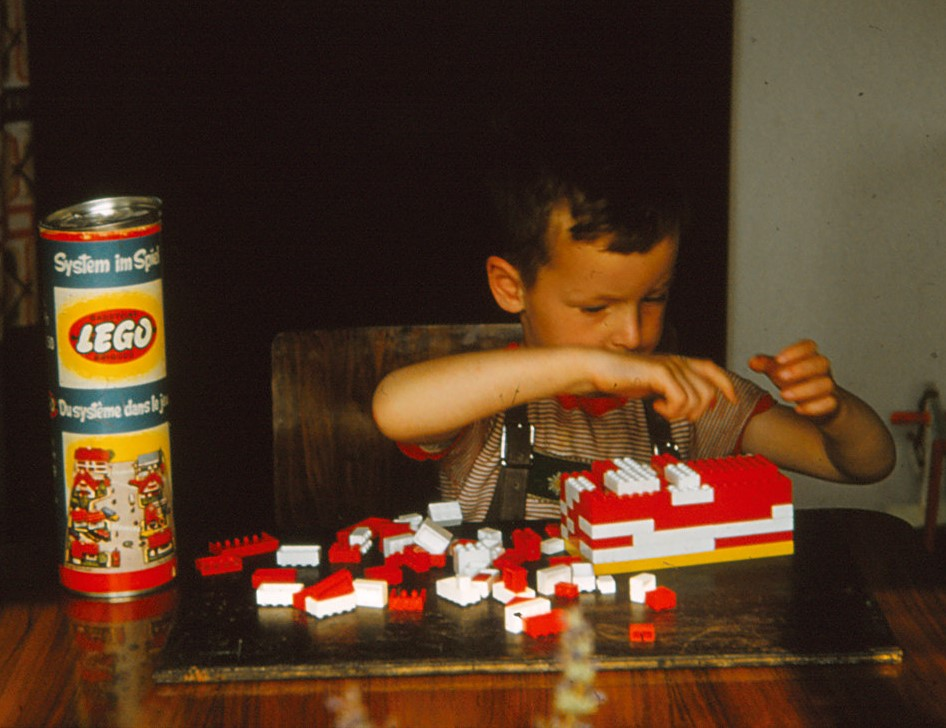
Boy from the UK playing with Lego in 1957. First sold in Denmark, the company expanded its sales across Europe in the 1950s, before expanding outside the continent from the 1960s.

By 1954, Christiansen's son, Godtfred, had become the junior managing director of the Lego Group. It was his conversation with an overseas buyer that led to the idea of a toy system. Godtfred saw the immense potential in Lego bricks to become a system for creative play, but the bricks still had some problems from a technical standpoint: Their locking ability was still limited, and they were not yet versatile. In 1958, the modern brick design was developed; ABS subsequently replaced cellulose acetate as the manufacturing material five years later. A patent application for the modern Lego brick design was filed in Denmark on 28 January 1958 and in various other countries in the subsequent few years.

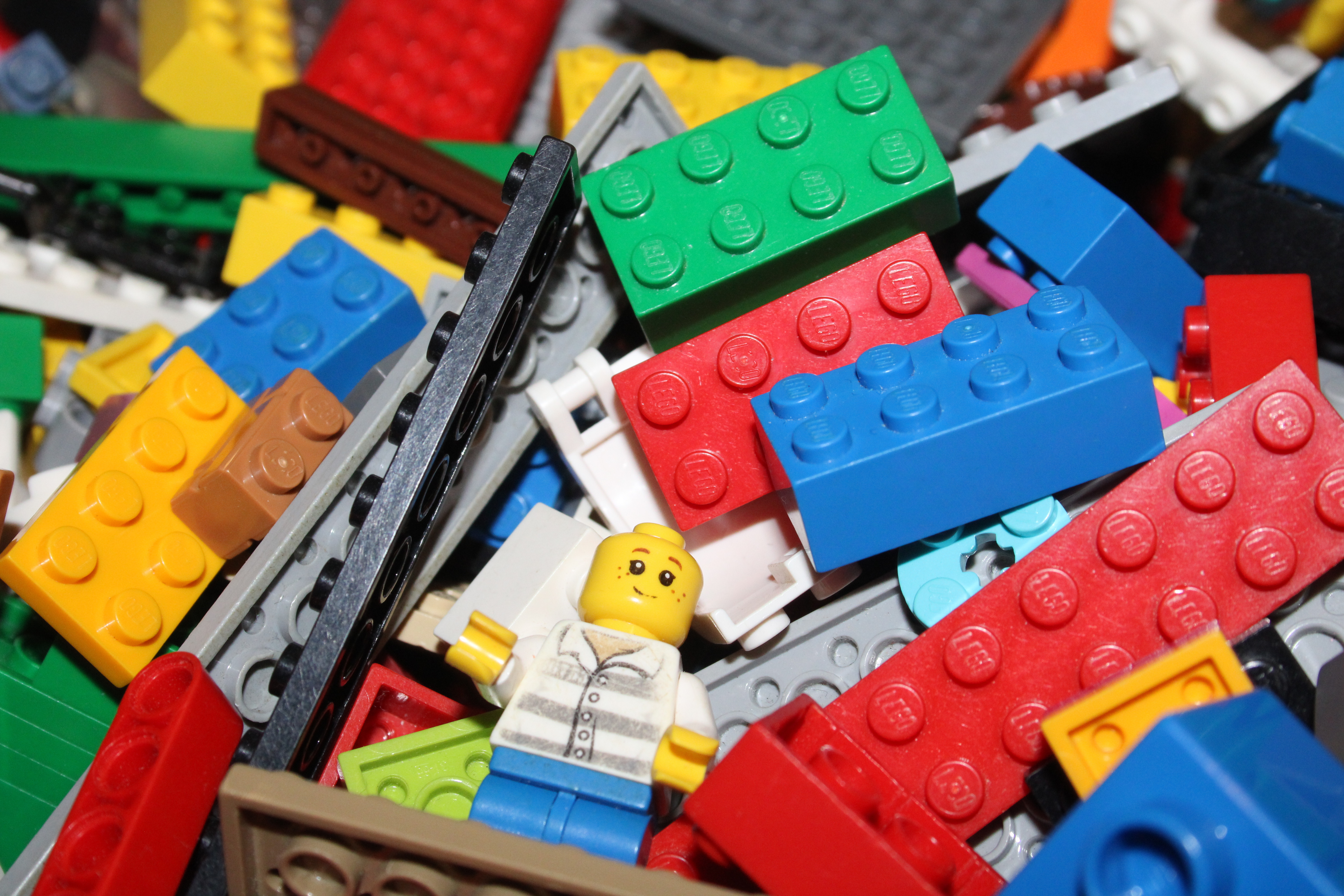
Lego bricks

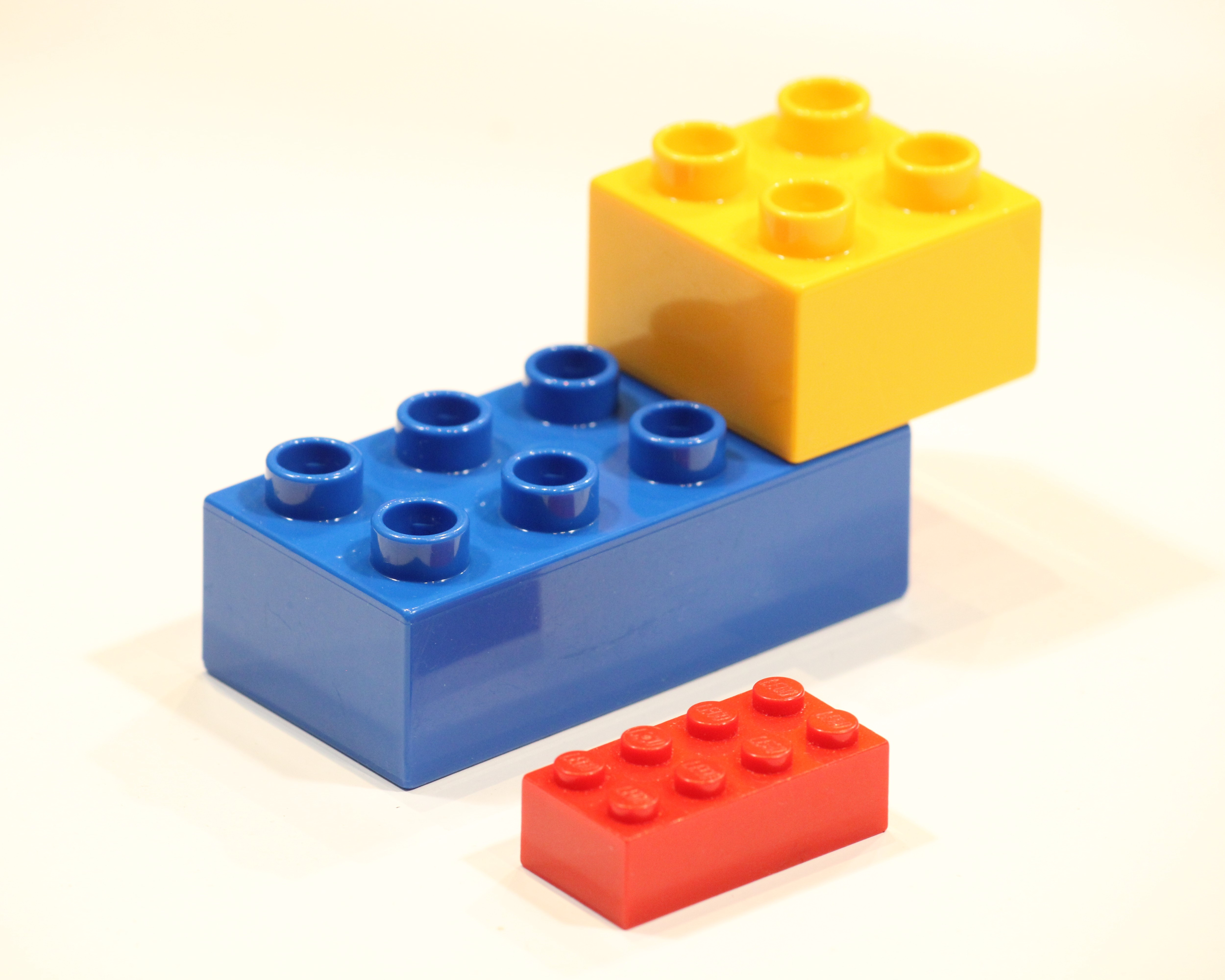
Two Lego Duplo bricks with a standard brick for comparison

The Lego Group's Duplo product line was introduced in 1969 and became a range of blocks whose lengths measure twice the width, height, and depth of standard Lego blocks and are aimed towards younger children. In 1978, Lego produced the first minifigures, which have since become a staple in most sets.

In 1997, more than five million Lego pieces were swept into the sea when a wave hit a cargo ship off the coast of Cornwall, England. Pieces have washed up over the ensuing decades, attracting attention from news outlets and social media.

In May 2011, Space Shuttle Endeavour mission STS-134 brought 13 Lego kits to the International Space Station, where astronauts built models to see how they would react in microgravity, as a part of the Lego Bricks in Space program. In May 2013, the largest model ever created, made of over 5 million bricks, was displayed in New York City: a one-to-one scale model of a Star Wars X-wing fighter. Other record breakers include a 34-metre (112 ft) tower and a 4 km (2.5 mi) railway.

In February 2015, marketing consulting company Brand Finance ranked Lego as the "world's most powerful brand", overtaking Ferrari.

While Lego has generally been considered a children's toy, there have also been adult fans of the toys. In 2020, Lego introduced sets aged 18+, generally some of their more expensive and difficult-to-assemble sets based on real world or fictional objects, such as the Concorde or Rivendell. The timing of these sets favourably aligned with the COVID-19 pandemic, with many adults purchasing these sets to work on during various lockdown periods. Popularity within adults was further pushed by the release of The Lego Movie and the reality series Lego Masters. By 2024, nearly 15% of the sets released in the U.S. were aimed at adult builders.

In May 2025 Lego announced that it was planning to move its London headquarters from Farringdon to 76 South Bank, in 2027.

== Design ==
Lego pieces of all varieties constitute a universal system. Despite there being variations in the design and the purposes of individual pieces over the years, each remains compatible in some way with existing pieces. Lego bricks from 1958 still interlock with those made presently, and Lego sets for young children are compatible with those made for teenagers. Six bricks of 2 × 4 studs can be combined in 915,103,765 ways.

Each piece must be manufactured to an exacting degree of precision. When two pieces are engaged, they must fit firmly, yet be easily disassembled. The machines that manufacture Lego bricks have tolerances as small as 10 micrometres (or 0.01 mm).

Dimensions of some standard Lego bricks and plates

Primary concept and development work for the toy takes place at the headquarters in Billund, where the company employs approximately 120 designers. The company also has smaller design offices in the UK, Spain, Germany, and Japan which are tasked with developing products aimed specifically at their respective national markets. The average development period for a new product is around twelve months, split into three stages. The first is to identify market trends and developments, including contact by the designers directly with the market; some are stationed in toy shops close to holidays, while others interview children. The second stage is the design and development of the product based on the results of the first stage. As of September 2008 the design teams use 3D modelling software to generate CAD drawings from initial design sketches. The designs are then prototyped using an in-house stereolithography machine. These prototypes are presented to the entire project team for comment and testing by parents and children during the "validation" process. Designs may then be altered in accordance with the results from the focus groups. Virtual models of completed Lego products are built concurrently with the writing of the user instructions. Completed CAD models are also used in the wider organisation for marketing and packaging.

Lego Digital Designer was an official piece of Lego software for Mac OS X and Windows which allowed users to create their own digital Lego designs. The program once allowed customers to order custom designs with a service to ship physical models from Digital Designer to consumers; the service ended in 2012. Lego's website now recommends BrickLink Studio.

== Manufacturing ==
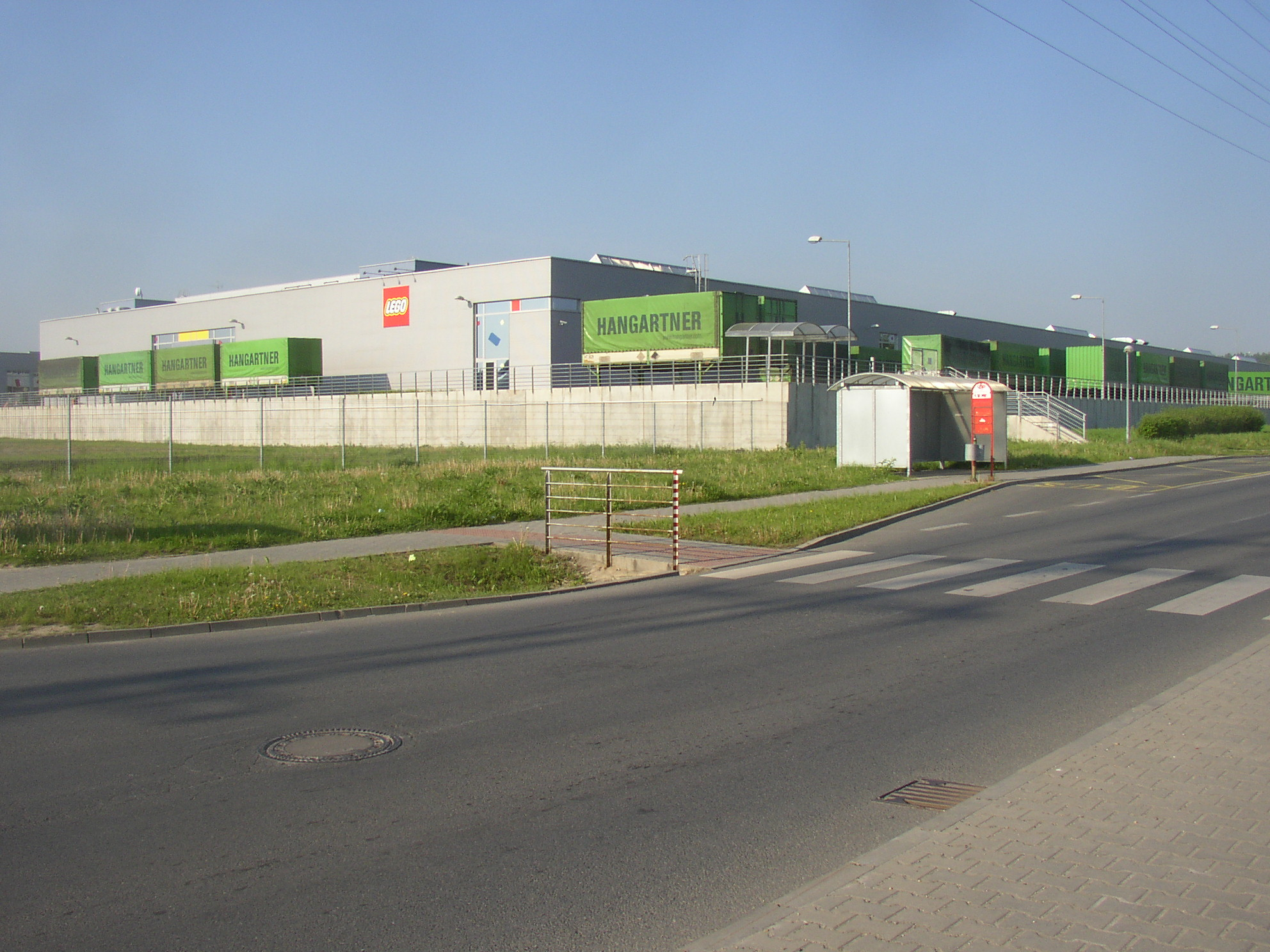
The Lego factory in Kladno, Czech Republic, in 2008

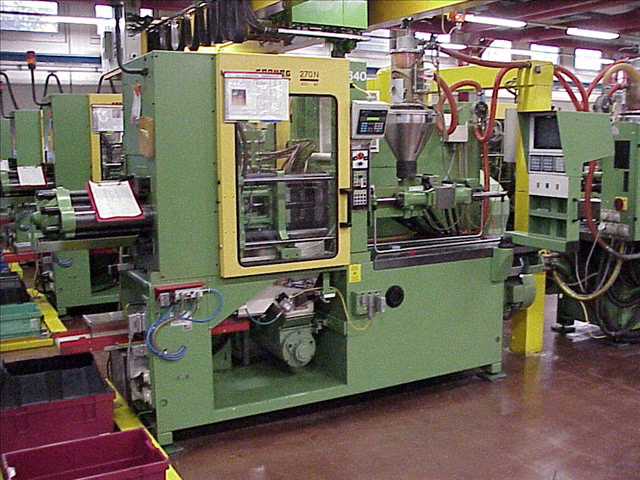
Lego injection moulding machines, made by the German company Arburg

Since 1963, Lego pieces have been manufactured from ABS plastic. As of September 2008, Lego engineers use the NX CAD/CAM/CAE PLM software suite to model the elements. The software allows the parts to be optimised by way of mould flow and stress analysis. Prototype moulds are sometimes built before the design is committed to mass production. The ABS plastic is heated to 232 °C (450 °F) until it reaches a dough-like consistency. It is then injected into the moulds using forces of between 25 and 150 tonnes and takes approximately 15 seconds to cool. The moulds are permitted a tolerance of up to twenty micrometres to ensure the bricks remain connected. Human inspectors check the output of the moulds to eliminate significant variations in colour or thickness. According to the Lego Group, about eighteen bricks out of every million fail to meet the standard required.

Lego factories recycle all but about 1 percent of their plastic waste from the manufacturing process. If the plastic cannot be re-used in Lego bricks, it is processed and sold on to industries that can make use of it. Lego, in 2018, set a self-imposed 2030 deadline to find a more eco-friendly alternative to ABS plastic.

Manufacturing of Lego bricks occurs at several locations around the world. Moulding is done in Billund, Denmark; Nyíregyháza, Hungary; Enfield, Connecticut, United States (from 1975 to 2006), Monterrey, Mexico; and most recently in Jiaxing, China. Brick decorations and packaging are done at plants in the former three countries and in Kladno, Czech Republic. The Lego Group estimates that in five decades it has produced 400 billion Lego blocks. Annual production of the bricks averages approximately 36 billion, or about 1140 elements per second. According to an article in BusinessWeek in 2006, Lego could also be considered the world's number-one tyre manufacturer; the factory produces about 306 million small rubber tyres a year. The claim was reiterated in 2012. In April 2023, Lego broke ground on its first manufacturing facility in the United States. The new carbon-neutral factory will be located near Richmond, Virginia. It will amount to over $1 billion in investment once completed in 2025. The 340-acre site will have rooftop and ground solar panels and an on-site 35–40 MW solar plant, generating the equivalent of the energy of powering 10,000 American homes. In April 2025, Lego opened its sixth factory worldwide, located in Vietnam, with Lego saying the location is its most environmentally sustainable factory to date.

In December 2012, the BBC's More or Less radio program asked the Open University's engineering department to determine "how many Lego bricks, stacked one on top of the other, it would take for the weight to destroy the bottom brick?" Using a hydraulic testing machine, members of the department determined the average maximum force a 2×2 Lego brick can stand is 4,240 newtons. Since an average 2×2 Lego brick has a mass of 1.152 grams (0.0406 oz), according to their calculations it would take a stack of 375,000 bricks to cause the bottom brick to collapse, which represents a stack 3,591 metres (11,781 ft) in height.

Private tests have shown several thousand assembly-disassembly cycles before the bricks begin to wear out, although Lego tests show fewer cycles.

In 2018, Lego announced that it will be using bio-derived polyethylene to make its botanical elements (parts such as leaves, bushes and trees). The New York Times reported the company's footprint that year was "about a million tons of carbon dioxide each year" and that it was investing about 1 billion kroner and hiring 100 people to work on changes. The paper reported that Lego's researchers "have already experimented with around 200 alternatives." In 2020, Lego announced that it would cease packaging its products in single-use plastic bags and would instead be using recyclable paper bags. In 2021, the company said it would aim to produce its bricks without using crude oil, by using recycled polyethylene terephthalate bottles, but in 2023 it reversed this decision, having found that this did not reduce its carbon dioxide emissions.

== Set themes ==
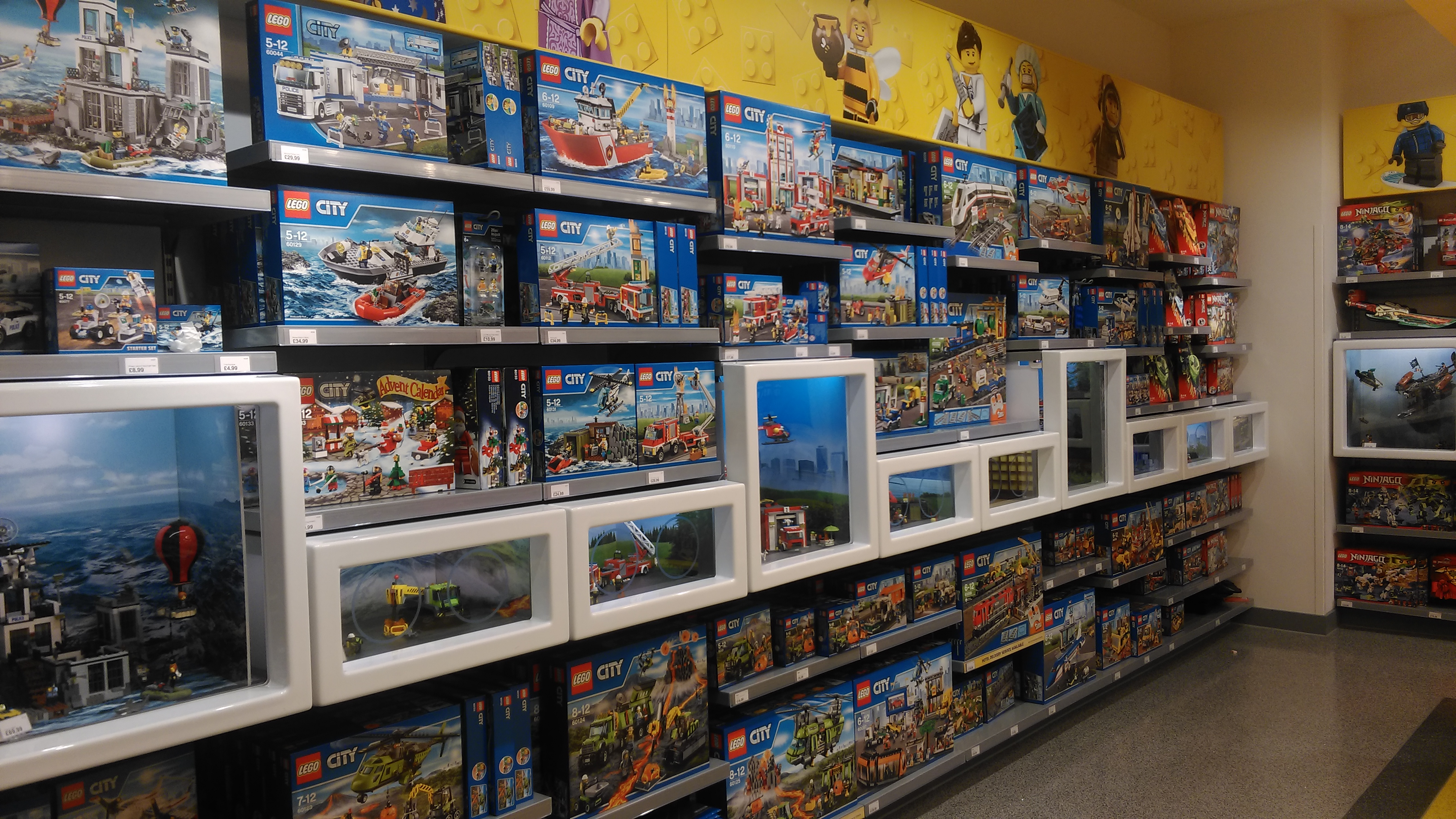
Lego sets of the Lego City theme

Since the 1950s, the Lego Group has released thousands of sets with a variety of themes, including space, pirates, trains, (European) castle, dinosaurs, undersea exploration, and wild west, as well as wholly original themes like Bionicle and Hero Factory. Some of the classic themes that continue to the present day include Lego City (a line of sets depicting city life introduced in 1973) and Lego Technic (a line aimed at emulating complex machinery, introduced in 1977).

Over the years, the company has licensed themes from numerous cartoon and film franchises and some from video games. These include Batman, Indiana Jones, Pirates of the Caribbean, Harry Potter, Star Wars, Marvel, Minecraft and Wicked. Although some of these themes, such as Star Wars and Indiana Jones, had highly successful sales, the Lego Group expressed in 2015 a desire to rely more upon their own characters and classic themes and less upon such licensed themes. Some sets include references to other themes, such as a Bionicle mask in one of the Harry Potter sets. Discontinued sets may become collectable and command value on the secondary market.

For the 2012 Summer Olympics in London, Lego released a special Team GB Minifigures series exclusively in the United Kingdom to mark the opening of the games. For the 2016 Summer Olympics and 2016 Summer Paralympics in Rio de Janeiro, Lego released a kit with the Olympic and Paralympic mascots Vinicius and Tom.

One of the largest commercially produced Lego sets was a minifigure-scaled edition of the Star Wars Millennium Falcon. Designed by Jens Kronvold Fredericksen, the Ultimate Collector's Millennium Falcon (set 10179) was released in 2007 and contained 5,195 pieces. It was later surpassed by a 5,922-piece Taj Mahal (set 10189). A redesigned Millennium Falcon (set 75192) retook the top spot in 2017 with 7,541 pieces. Since then, the Millennium Falcon has been superseded by the Lego Art World Map (set 31203) at 11,695 pieces, the Lego Titanic (set 10294) at 9,090 pieces, and the Lego Architect Colosseum (set 10276) at 9,036 pieces.

In 2022, Lego introduced its Eiffel Tower (set 10307), which consists of 10,001 parts and reaches a height of 149 cm (60 in), making it the tallest set and tower, but second in number of parts after the World Map.

=== Robotics themes ===
The company also initiated a robotics line of toys called Mindstorms in 1999, and continued to expand and update this range until it was eventually discontinued in 2022. The roots of the product originated with a programmable brick developed at the MIT Media Lab, and the name was taken from a paper by Seymour Papert, a computer scientist and educator who developed the educational theory of constructionism, and whose research was at times funded by the Lego Group.

The programmable Lego brick which was at the heart of these robotics sets underwent several updates and redesigns, with the last being called the 'EV3' brick, being sold under the name of Lego Mindstorms EV3. The set included various sensors such as touch, light, sound and ultrasonic waves, with several others being sold separately, including an RFID reader.

The programmable brick could be programmed using official software available for Windows and Mac computers. In the earliest iterations of the product, the program would be uploaded to the programmable brick via an infrared transmitter, while in later versions this was achieved via Bluetooth or a USB cable. Unofficial programming languages that can be used with Lego Mindstorms programmable bricks have also been developed.

There have been several robotics competitions which used the Lego robotics sets. The earliest was Botball, a national U.S. middle- and high-school competition stemming from the MIT 6.270 Lego robotics tournament. Other Lego robotics competitions include FIRST LEGO League Discover for children ages 4–6, FIRST LEGO League Explore for students ages 6–9 and FIRST Lego League Challenge for students ages 9–16 (age 9–14 in the United States, Canada, and Mexico). These programs have offered real-world engineering challenges to participants using LEGO-based robots to complete tasks. In its 2019–2020 season, there were 38,609 FIRST LEGO League Challenge teams and 21,703 FIRST LEGO League Explore teams around the world. The international RoboCup Junior football competition involved extensive use of Lego Mindstorms equipment which was often pushed to its extreme limits.

The capabilities of the Mindstorms range have also been harnessed for use in the Iko Creative Prosthetic System, a prosthetic limbs system designed for children. Designs for these Lego prosthetics allow everything from mechanical diggers to laser-firing spaceships to be screwed on to the end of a child's limb. Iko was the work of the Chicago-based Colombian designer Carlos Arturo Torres, and is a modular system that allows children to customise their own prosthetics with the ease of clicking together plastic bricks. Designed with Lego's Future Lab, the Danish toy company's experimental research department, and Cirec, a Colombian foundation for physical rehabilitation, the modular prosthetic incorporated myoelectric sensors that register the activity of the muscle in the stump and send a signal to control movement in the attachment. A processing unit in the body of the prosthetic contained an engine compatible with Lego Mindstorms, which allowed the wearer to build an extensive range of customised, programmable limbs.

== In popular culture ==
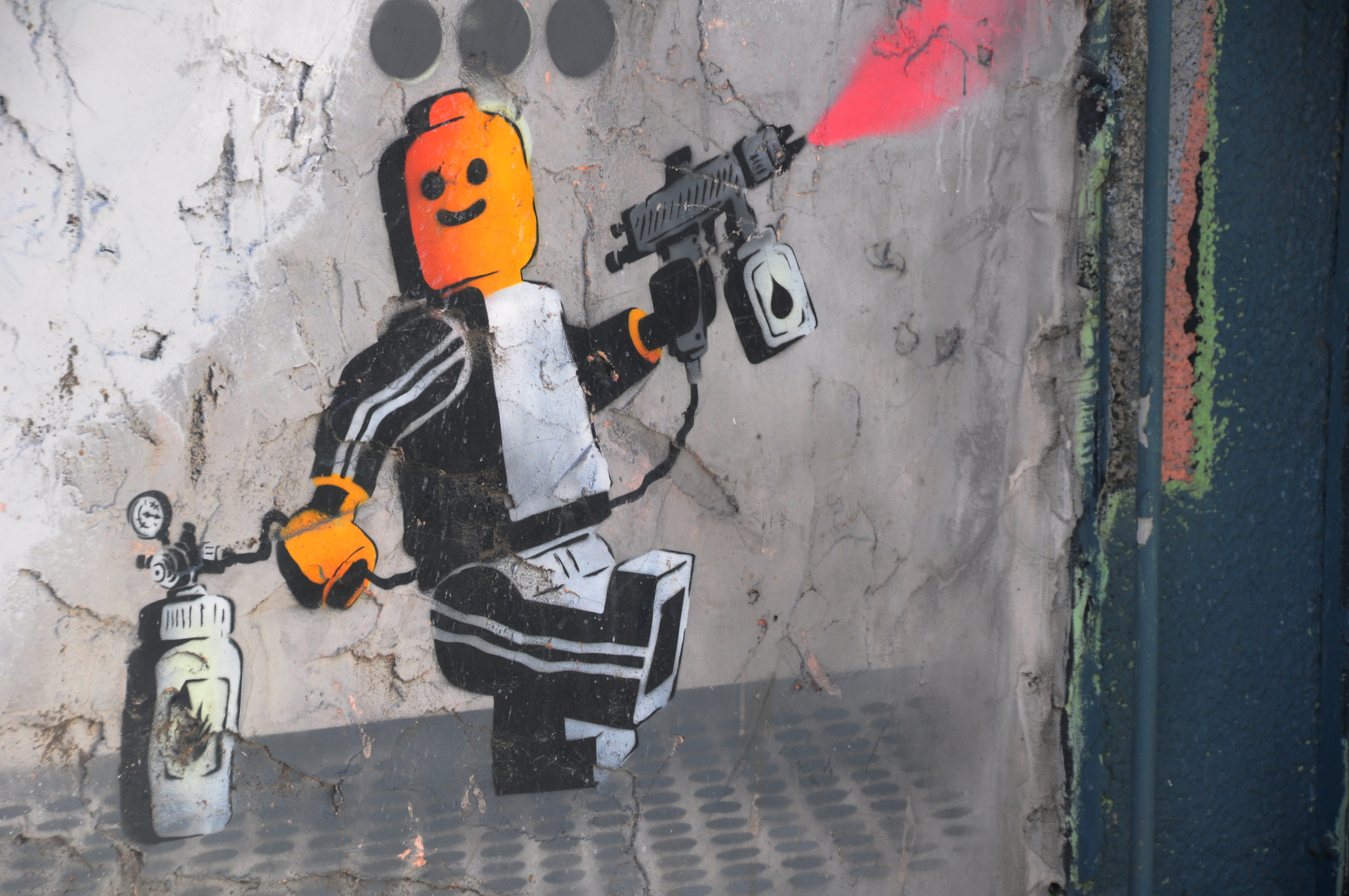
Lego minifigure in Tel Aviv street art

Lego's popularity is demonstrated by its widespread representation and use in many cultural works, including books, films, and art. It has even been used in the classroom as a teaching tool. In the US, Lego Education North America is a joint venture between Pitsco, Inc. and the educational division of the Lego Group.

In 1998, Lego bricks were one of the original inductees into the National Toy Hall of Fame at The Strong in Rochester, New York.

"Lego" is commonly used as a mass noun ("some Lego") or, in American English, as a countable noun with plural "Legos", to refer to the bricks themselves, (e.g. genericization) but as is common for trademarks, Lego group insists on the name being used as an adjective when referring to a product (as in "Lego bricks").

Lego bricks have a reputation for causing pain when stepped on, often being humorously exaggerated as being more extreme than the pain caused by severe injuries.

== Clones ==
The last significant patent for Lego bricks expired in 1978. Since then, competitors have produced blocks of similar dimensions and designs that can be connected with Lego bricks. In 2002, Lego sued the CoCo Toy Company in Beijing for copyright infringement over its "Coko bricks" product. CoCo was ordered to cease manufacture of the products, publish a formal apology and pay damages. Lego sued the English company Best-Lock Construction Toys in German courts in 2004 and 2009; the Federal Patent Court of Germany denied Lego trademark protection for the shape of its bricks in the latter case. In 2005, the Lego Company sued Canadian company Ritvik Holdings Inc., which makes Mega Bloks, for trademark violations. However, the Supreme Court of Canada upheld Ritvik Holdings Inc.'s rights to sell its product. In 2010, the European Court of Justice ruled that the eight-peg design of the original Lego brick "merely performs a technical function [and] cannot be registered as a trademark."

In 2020 and 2021, Lego sent cease and desist letters to small toy retailers and popular YouTubers in Germany. In 2021, a shipment of bricks delivered by clone producer Qman was blocked from passing through German customs due to concerns over potential infringement of Lego's intellectual property. The recipient toy retailer initiated an appeal for donations to import containers of Lego clones from China to Germany and donate them to children's homes, which received more than €350,000 within a couple of weeks.

== Related services ==
=== Official website ===
First launched in 1996, the Lego website has developed over the years, and provides many extra services beyond an online store and a product catalogue. There are also moderated message boards that were founded in 2001. The site also includes instruction booklets for all Lego sets dating back to 2002.

The Lego website features a social media app named Lego Life, which is designed for children under 13 years of age. The app is available as a free download and only features Lego-related content. It was designed to be a social network for children to be inspired, create and share their Lego builds, photos and videos with a like-minded community, whilst also providing Lego content in the form of product advertising, images, videos, campaigns and competitions. The app incorporates a variety of child safety features to provide a safe digital environment for children, including the protection of personal information and the heavy moderation of all uploaded user-generated content and communication.

My Lego Network was a social networking site that involved items, blueprints, ranks, badges which were earned for completing certain tasks, trading and trophies called masterpieces which allowed users to progress to go to the next rank. The website had a built-in inbox which allowed users to send pre-written messages to one another. The Lego Network included automated non-player characters within called "Networkers", who were able to do things which normal users could not do, sending custom messages, and selling masterpieces and blueprints. The site also had modules which were set up on the user's page that gave the user items, or that displayed picture compositions. My Lego network closed in 2015.

Before My Lego Network, there were Lego Club Pages, which essentially held the same purpose, although the design lacked complex interaction.

=== Theme parks ===
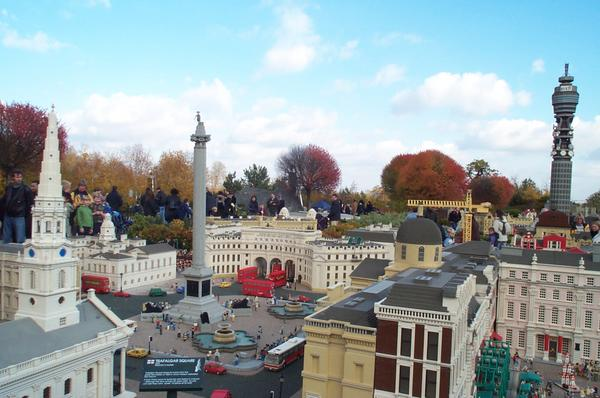
A model of Trafalgar Square, London in Legoland Windsor

Merlin Entertainments operates ten Legoland amusement parks, the original in Billund, Denmark, opened in 1968, followed by parks in Windsor, England, Günzburg, Germany, Carlsbad, California, Winter Haven, Florida, Iskandar Puteri, Malaysia, Dubai, United Arab Emirates, Nagoya, Japan, Goshen, New York, and finally the park in Shanghai, China, opened in 2022. On 13 July 2005, control of 70% of the Legoland parks was sold for $460 million to the Blackstone Group of New York while the remaining 30% is still held by Lego Group. There are also eight Legoland Discovery Centres, two in Germany, four in the United States, one in Japan and one in the United Kingdom. Two Legoland Discovery Centres opened in 2013: one at the Westchester Ridge Hill shopping complex in Yonkers, New York, and one at the Vaughan Mills in Vaughan, Ontario, Canada. Another opened at American Dream Meadowlands in East Rutherford, New Jersey, in 2021.

=== Retail stores ===
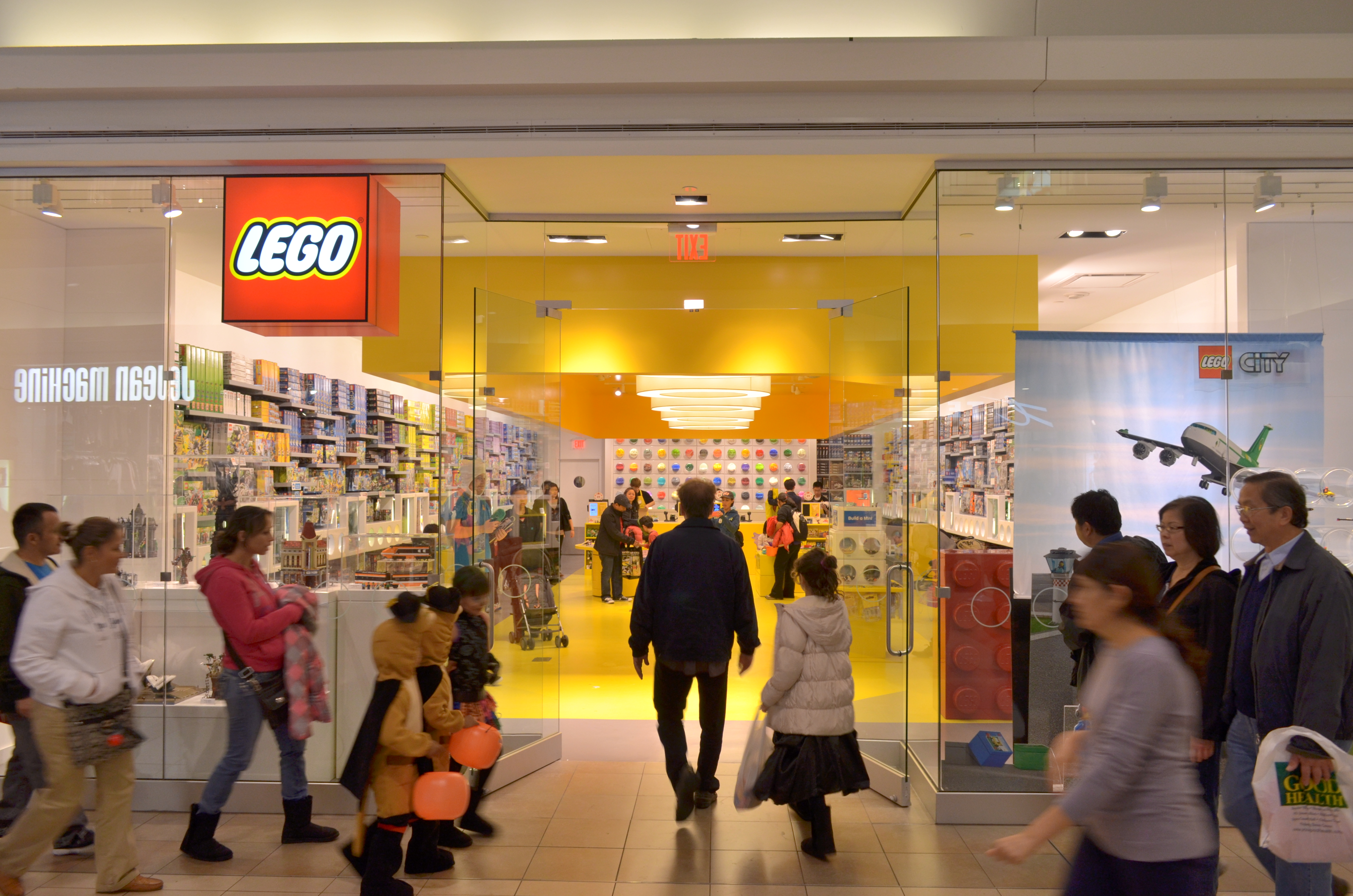
A Lego store in Toronto, Canada

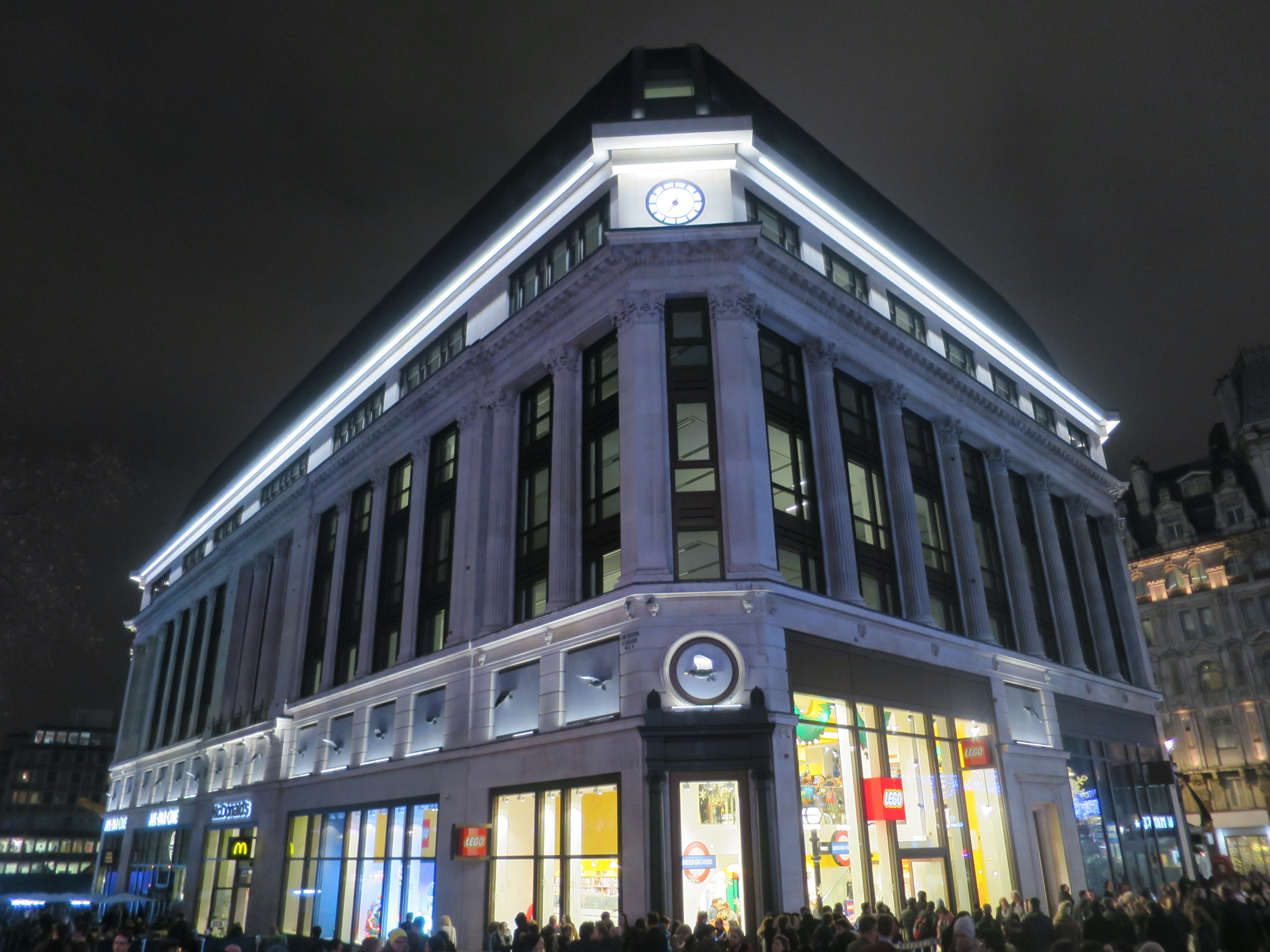
The world's largest Lego store in Leicester Square, London

The first Lego store to open anywhere in the world was in Sydney, Australia, in 1984. Located in the Birkenhead Point Outlet Centre it was not only the first dedicated Lego retail outlet, but it also had displays including many iconic Australian items such as the Holden FJ, Sydney Harbour Bridge, and the Sydney Opera House as well as buildings from Amsterdam, dinosaurs and an English Village. Known as The LEGO Centre, Birkenhead Point, the store closed in the early 1990s.

As of March 2024, Lego operates 1031 retail shops, called Lego Stores, globally. The world's largest Lego store is located in Leicester Square, London. The U.S. stores include the Downtown Disney shopping complexes at Disneyland and Walt Disney World Resorts as well as in Mall of America in Bloomington, Minnesota. The opening of each new store is celebrated with a weekend-long event in which a Master Model Builder creates, with the help of volunteers—a larger-than-life Lego statue, which is then displayed at the new store for several weeks.

=== Business consultancy ===
Since around 2000, the Lego Group has been promoting "Lego Serious Play", a form of business consultancy fostering creative thinking, in which team members build metaphors of their organizational identities and experiences using Lego bricks. Participants work through imaginary scenarios using visual three-dimensional Lego constructions, imaginatively exploring possibilities in a serious form of play.

== Related products ==
=== Video games ===
Lego branched out into the video game market in 1997 by founding Lego Media International Limited, and Lego Island was released that year by Mindscape. After this Lego released titles such as Lego Creator and Lego Racers.

After Lego closed down their publishing subsidiary, they moved on to a partnership with Traveller's Tales, and went on to make games based on licensed properties, like Lego Star Wars, Lego Indiana Jones, Lego Batman, and Lego Marvel Super Heroes. In 2014 Lego and TT Games released a video game based on The Lego Movie.

Light Brick Studio was originally founded in 2019 as the Lego Group's own internal video game development studio. The studio was formed to create more experimental games featuring Lego content. When initially formed, it only had a few employees. Although a subsidiary of the Lego Group, it was compared to an independent game studio. Their first project, Lego Builder's Journey, was originally titled Lego Arthouse. It was released in December 2019.

In November 2020, it was announced that Light Brick Studio would split from The Lego Group and become independent, with the idea that it could eventually become in-house again. In 2021, it was reported on the Bits N' Bricks podcast that the studio was developing a second game. The studio's next game, Lego Voyagers, was released in September 2025.

=== Board games ===
Lego Games launched in 2009, was a series of Lego-themed board games designed by Cephas Howard and Reiner Knizia in which the players usually build the playing board out of Lego bricks and then play with Lego-style players. Examples of the games include "Minotaurus", in which players roll dice to move characters within a brick-build labyrinth, "Creationary", in which players must build something which appears on a card, or "Ramses Pyramid", in which players collect gems and climb up a customizable pyramid. Like many board games, the games use dice. In Lego Games, the dice are Lego, with Lego squares with symbols on Lego studs on the dice, surrounded by rubber. The games vary from simple to complex; some are similar to "traditional" board games, while others are completely different.

=== Films and television ===
The first official Lego film was the straight-to-DVD release of Bionicle: Mask of Light in 2003 developed by Creative Capers Entertainment and distributed by Miramax Home Entertainment. Several other straight-to-DVD computer-animated Bionicle sequels and Hero Factory movies were produced in the following years. Lego: The Adventures of Clutch Powers was released on DVD in February 2010, a computer-animated film made by Tinseltown Toons. A computer-generated animated series titled Lego Ninjago: Masters of Spinjitzu began in January 2011 for the Lego Ninjago brand. Another television series titled Legends of Chima began in 2013 for the Legends of Chima brand. In December 2015, a television series titled Nexo Knights made its debut for the Lego Nexo Knights brand. An animated series titled Lego Elves was released in 2015 and another titled Lego Elves: Secrets of Elvendale was released in 2017 for the Lego Elves brand. In 2016, Lego Bionicle: The Journey To One was released for the Bionicle franchise and Lego Friends: The Power of Friendship for the Lego Friends brand. In June 2019, an animated series titled Lego City Adventures was released for the Lego City brand. In 2021, an animated series titled Lego Monkie Kid was released to support the Lego brand of the same name.

The Lego Movie, a feature film based on Lego toys, was released by Warner Bros. in February 2014. It featured Chris Pratt in the lead role, with substantial supporting characters voiced by Elizabeth Banks, Will Arnett, Morgan Freeman, Liam Neeson, Alison Brie, Will Ferrell and Nick Offerman. A contest was held for contestants to submit designs for vehicles to be used in the film. After the release of The Lego Movie, independent Canadian toy retailers reported issues with shortages of Lego products and cited cancellations of Lego pre-orders without warning as a motive to stock compatible, rival products.

A spin-off of The Lego Movie, entitled The Lego Batman Movie, directed by Chris McKay was released in the US in February 2017. A sequel to The Lego Batman Movie was planned and later cancelled.

In June 2013, it was reported that Warner Bros. was developing a feature film adaptation of Lego Ninjago. Brothers Dan Hageman and Kevin Hageman were attached to write the adaptation, while Dan Lin and Roy Lee, along with Phil Lord and Chris Miller, were announced as producers. The film, The Lego Ninjago Movie, was released in September 2017.

In February 2019, The Lego Movie 2: The Second Part was released, which was a direct sequel to the original film and starred Chris Pratt in the lead role.

On 27 January 2024, it was announced that a new film, titled Piece by Piece, would be released on 11 October 2024. It is a biographical film focusing on the life of singer Pharrell Williams.

As of August 2025, Universal and the Lego Group are developing an animated Lego film tentatively called Inner Child from a concept by James Morosini.

== See also ==
- Lego Smart Brick – 2026 product by the Lego group
