= FAC =

FAC may refer to:

== Arts ==
- Faisalabad Arts Council, in Pakistan
- Featured Artists' Coalition, a British music organization
- Fine Arts Center (disambiguation), for several uses
- Firehall Arts Centre, in Vancouver, British Columbia, Canada
- Fremont Arts Council, in Seattle, Washington, United States

== Education ==
- Federation autonome du collegial, a Canadian teachers union
- Flawn Academic Center, of the University of Texas at Austin
- Florida Agricultural College, now the University of Florida

== Government and politics ==
- Asturias Forum, a political party in Asturias, Spain
- Catalan Liberation Front (Catalan: Front d'Alliberament Català)
- Federal Administrative Court (disambiguation)
- Federal Advisory Council, part of the United States Federal Reserve System
- Federal Airports Corporation, a former Australian government enterprise
- Federal Audit Clearinghouse, a government office within the United States government
- Firearms certificate, in the United Kingdom
- Florida Administrative Code
- Foreign Affairs Canada
- Foreign Affairs Council, of the European Union

=== Advocacy groups ===
- Feminists Against Censorship, in the United Kingdom
- First Amendment Center, in the United States
- Florida Action Committee

== Military ==
- Canadian Armed Forces (French: Forces armées canadiennes)
- Cameroonian Armed Forces (French: Forces armées camerounaises)
- Colombian Air Force (Spanish: Fuerza Aérea Colombiana)
- Fast attack craft
- Forças Armadas de Cabinda, an Angolan paramilitary group
- Forces Armées Congolaise, now the Armed Forces of the Democratic Republic of the Congo
- Forward air control

== Sport ==
- Andorran Cycling Federation (Catalan: Federació Andorrana de Ciclisme)
- FA Cup, an English football competition
- Famalicense Atlético Clube, a Portuguese sports club
- Floridsdorfer AC, an Austrian football club

== Science and technology ==
- FAC-System, a mechanical construction set
- Familial amyloid cardiomyopathy
- Fanconi anemia, complementation group C
- Faisceaux algébriques cohérents, a mathematics paper sometimes referred to as 'FAC'
- Field-aligned current
- Flow-accelerated corrosion
- Formal Aspects of Computing, a scholarly journal
- Facial isomer of octahedral complexes; see fac–mer isomerism
- Flight augmentation computers of the A320

== Other uses ==
- Faaite Airport, in French Polynesia
- Face-amount certificate company
- FAC (marque), FAW Lingyuan

== See also ==
- FAQ
