= Construction set =

Set of pieces for model building

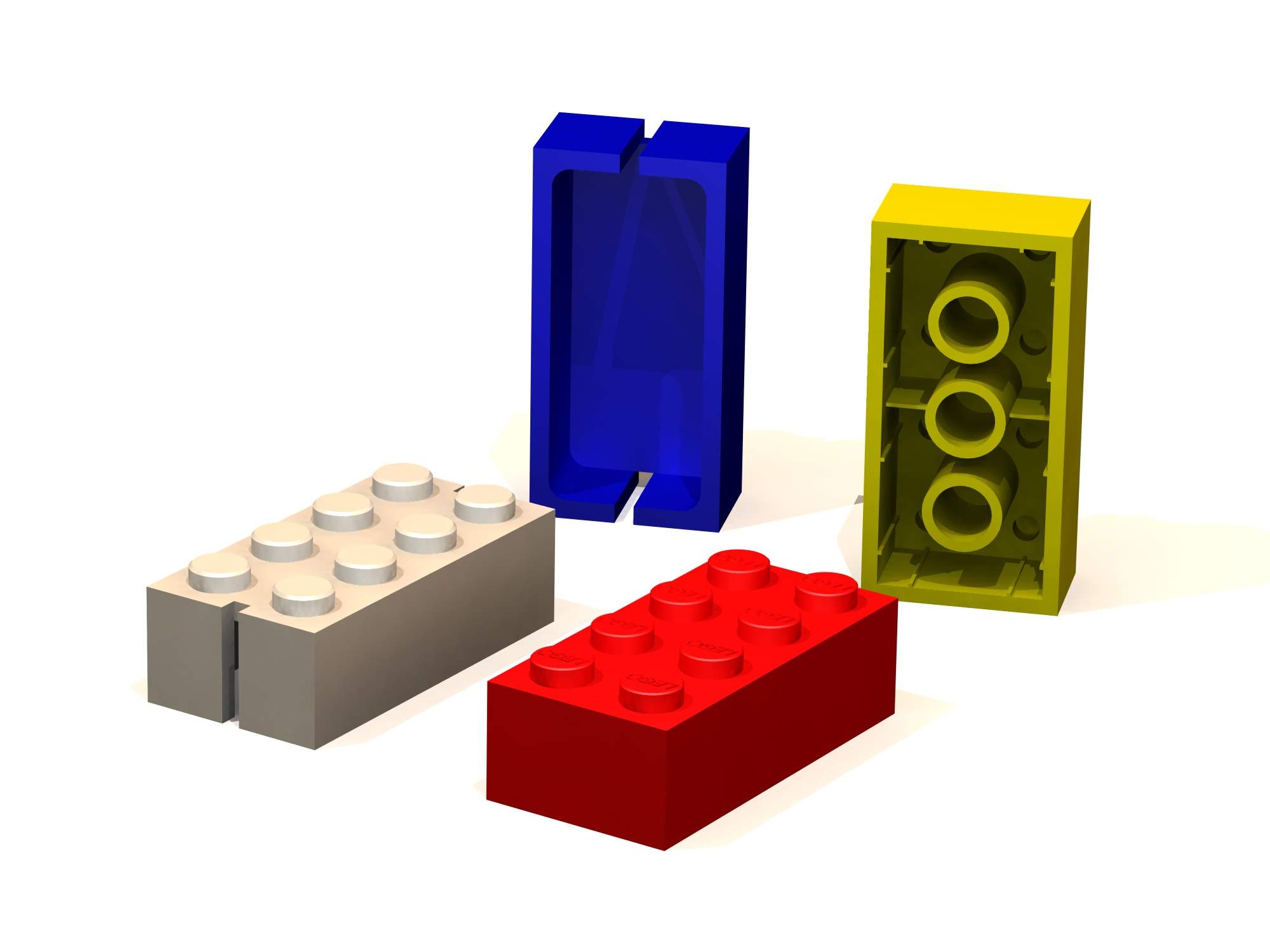
Kiddicraft and Lego building blocks in different colors.

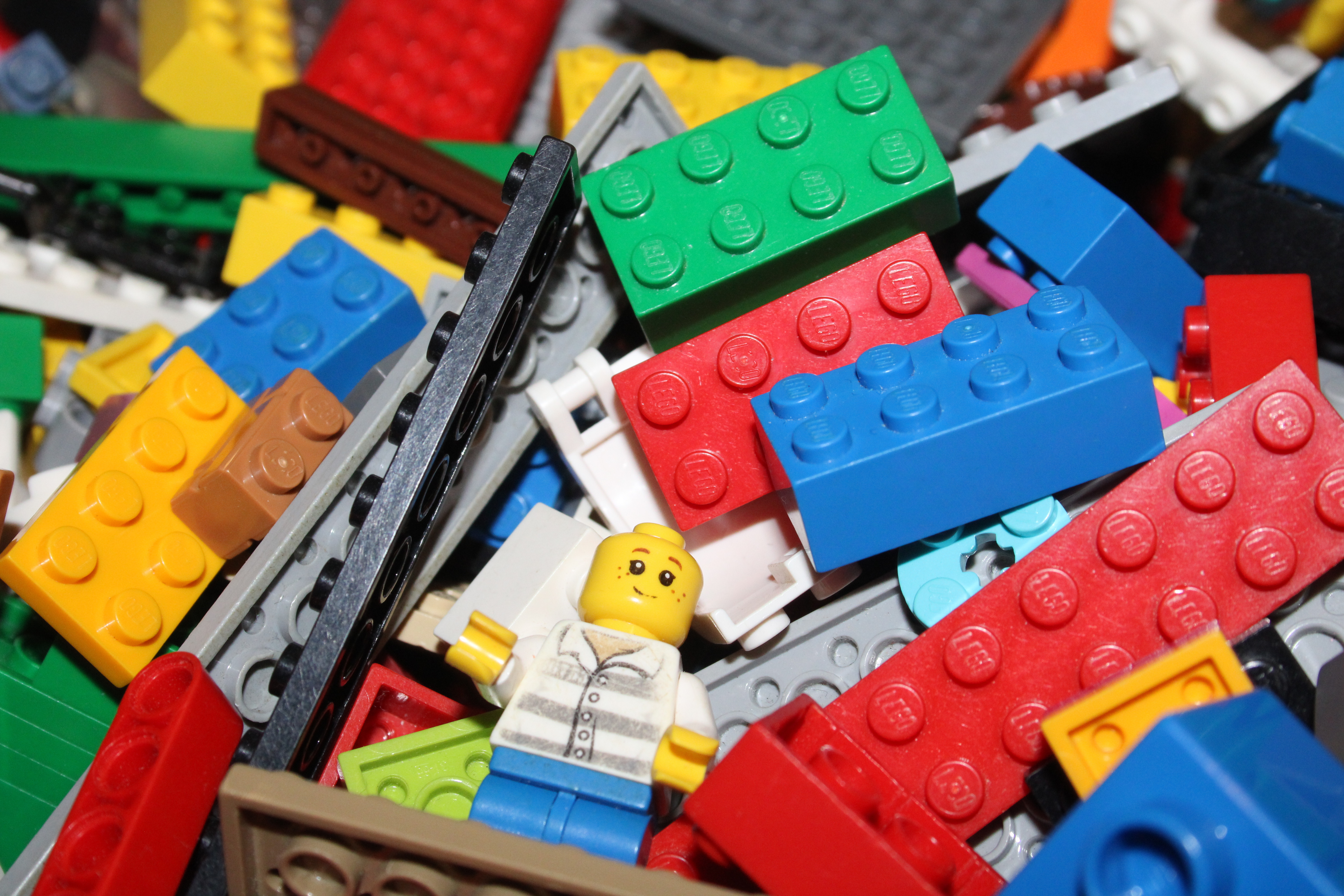
Lego bricks are a construction set example.

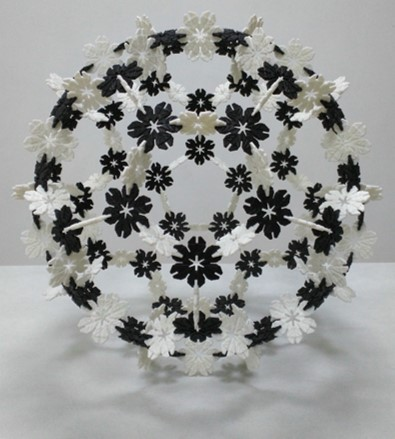
Interlocking disks enable the construction of high-symmetry models such as that of C_{60} fullerene.

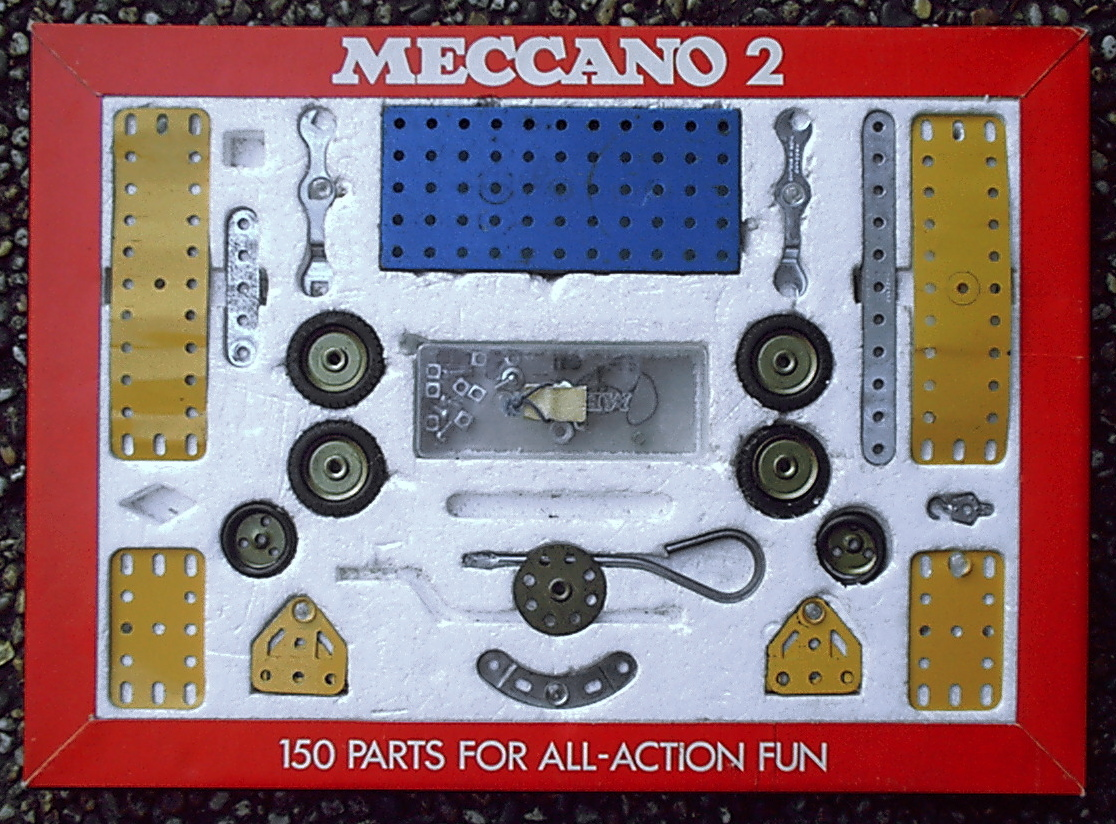
1970s No. 2 Meccano set

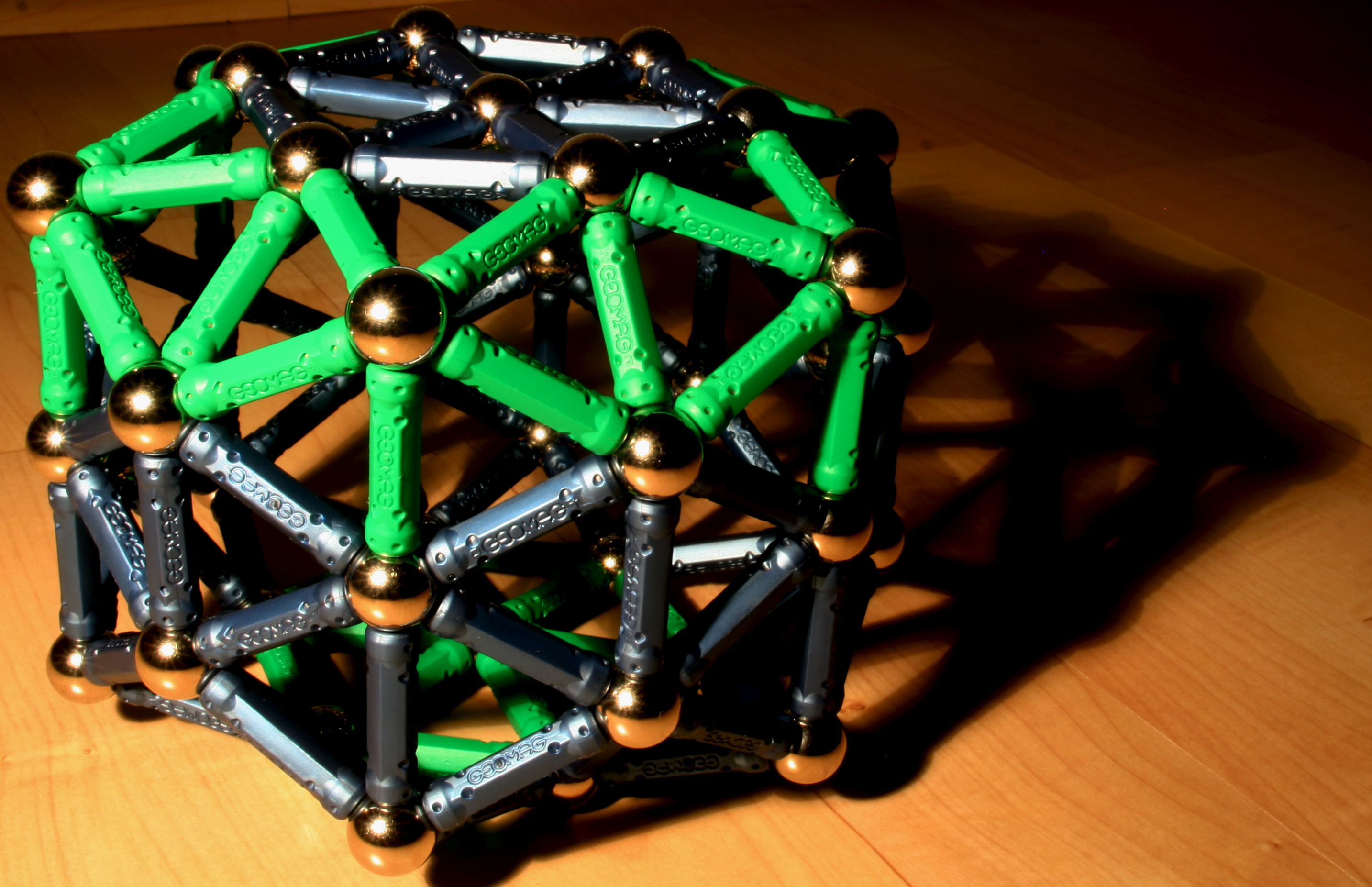
Geomag which uses rods metal balls and is Magnetic

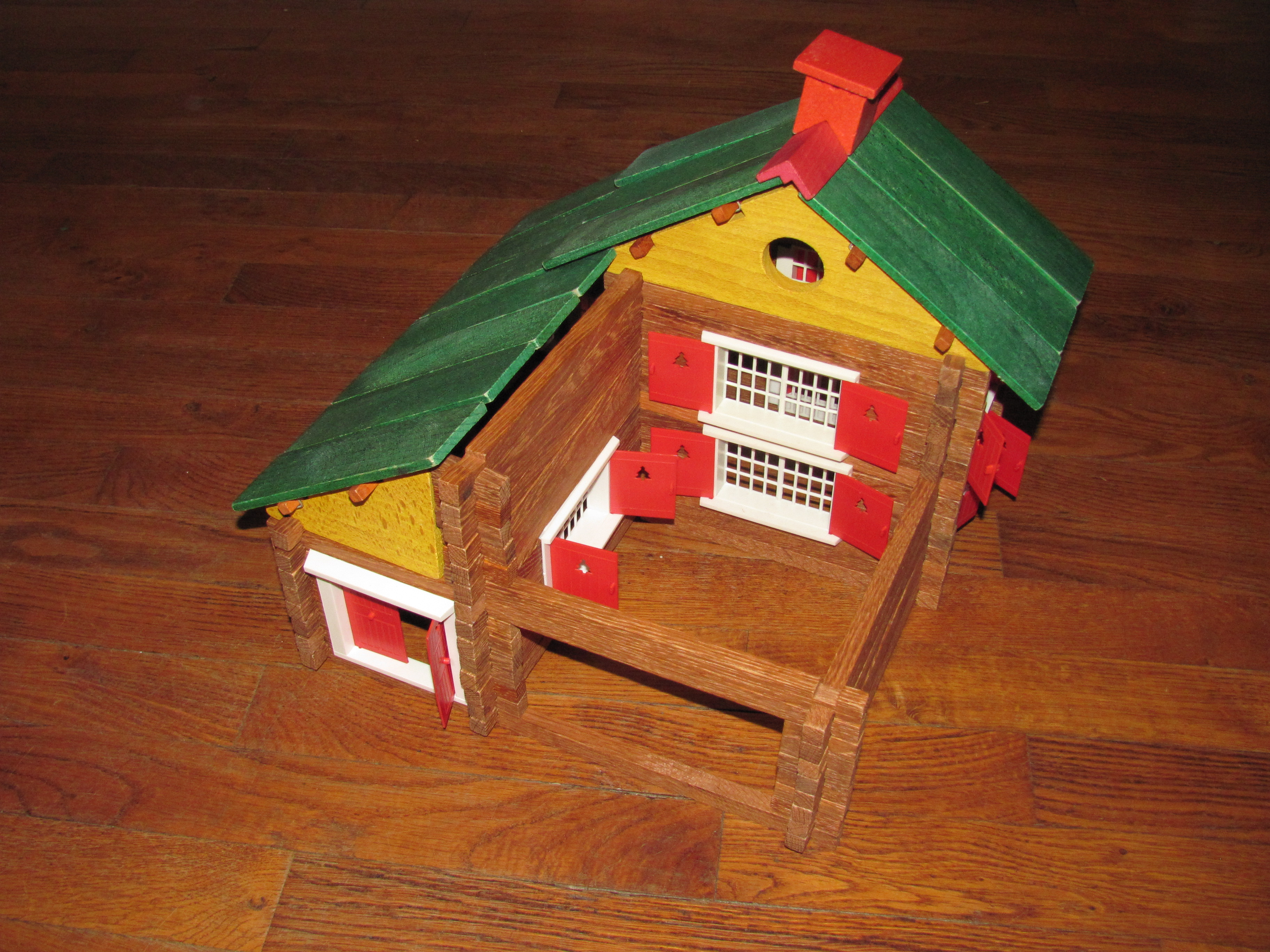
Jeujura wooden construction set (Swiss chalet)

A construction set is a standardized piece assortment allowing for the construction of various different models. Construction sets are most often marketed as toys. Popular construction toy brands include Lincoln Logs and LEGO.

== Toys ==
=== Psychological benefits ===
Construction toy play is beneficial for building social skills and building trust in others because it acts as a collaborative task where individuals have to cooperate to finish the task – building an object out of Lego, for example. The effect was found in high school students.

For children specifically, children who complete models using toy building blocks have much better spatial ability than children who do not complete such models. Spatial ability also predicts completion of models.

Construction toy play is also beneficial for autistic children when both individual and group play with building blocks is incorporated. Autistic children who played with building blocks were motivated to initiate social contact with children their age, able to maintain and endure contact with those children, and were also able to surpass the barriers of being withdrawn and highly structured.

=== Vintage Lego health concerns ===
Red and yellow Lego building blocks, which were manufactured between 1963 and 1981, can release carcinogenic cadmium when exposed to stomach acid in amounts exceeding today's limits about 10-fold.

== Categories ==
Construction sets can be categorized according to their connection method and geometry:

- Struts of variable length that are connected to any point along another strut, and at nodes.
  - Tesseract connection points are initially flexible but can be made rigid with the addition of clips.
- Struts of fixed but multiple lengths that are connected by nodes are good for building space frames, and often have components that allow full rotational freedom.
  - D_{8h} (*228) nodes are used for K'Nex, Tinkertoys, Playskool Pipeworks, Cleversticks and interlocking disks in general.
  - D_{6h} nodes are used for interlocking disks.
  - I_{h} (*532) nodes are used for Zometool
- Panels of varying sizes and shapes
  - Panels of varying sizes and shapes are connected by pins or screws perpendicular to the panels, which are good for building linkages such as an Erector Set, Mini Unit Beams, Meccano, Merkur, Steel Tec, Lego Technic, Trix, FAC-System, Constructo Straws, and Überstix
  - Panels of varying sizes and shapes with flexible panels or hinges between panels such as Tog'l, Jovo Click 'N Construct, Zaks, and Polydron.
- Struts and panels
  - Girder and Panel building sets
  - Synestructics (does not make pentagonal structures)
  - Ramagon (some panels include studs for connecting with Lego clones)
  - Geomag (components are magnetic)
  - Bayko
  - Construx
- Building components with various methods of connection include:
  - No connection: toy blocks, Anchor Stone Blocks, KEVA planks, Kapla, and Unit Bricks
  - Studs: Engino, Rokenbok, Lego, Lego clones, Coco, Rasti, Tente, Mega Bloks, Fischertechnik, Playmobil, Loc Blocs, Cobi blocks, Betta Builda, Guangdong Loongon (and its subbrands: Cogo, Lepin, Xingboa) and Oxford, Kre-O, Clementoni mechanics.
  - Notches: Lincoln Logs, GIK, Stickle bricks, and Überstix
  - Sleeves: Capsela
- Spherical magnets
- Many marble run toys are construction sets.

== Influence in the arts and culture ==
The architect Frank Lloyd Wright credited his childhood building blocks designed by Friedrich Fröbel as a major influence, and his son John Lloyd Wright invented the widely-known Lincoln Logs building set. In addition to teaching architectural concepts such as modularity and load-bearing construction, many architects credit construction set play as influencing their later design.

A set of 3D-printable adapters for popular toy construction systems called the Free Universal Construction Kit is in the collection of the Museum of Modern Art. The work was also included in the museum's 2025 exhibition, Pirouette: Turning Points in Design, featuring "widely recognized design icons [...] highlighting pivotal moments in design history," such as the Bean Bag chair, the Sony Walkman portable cassette player, and the NASA Worm insignia.

== See also ==
- Pontiki, construction toy for building models of unusual creatures
- Unit block
