= Magna-Tiles =

Construction toy

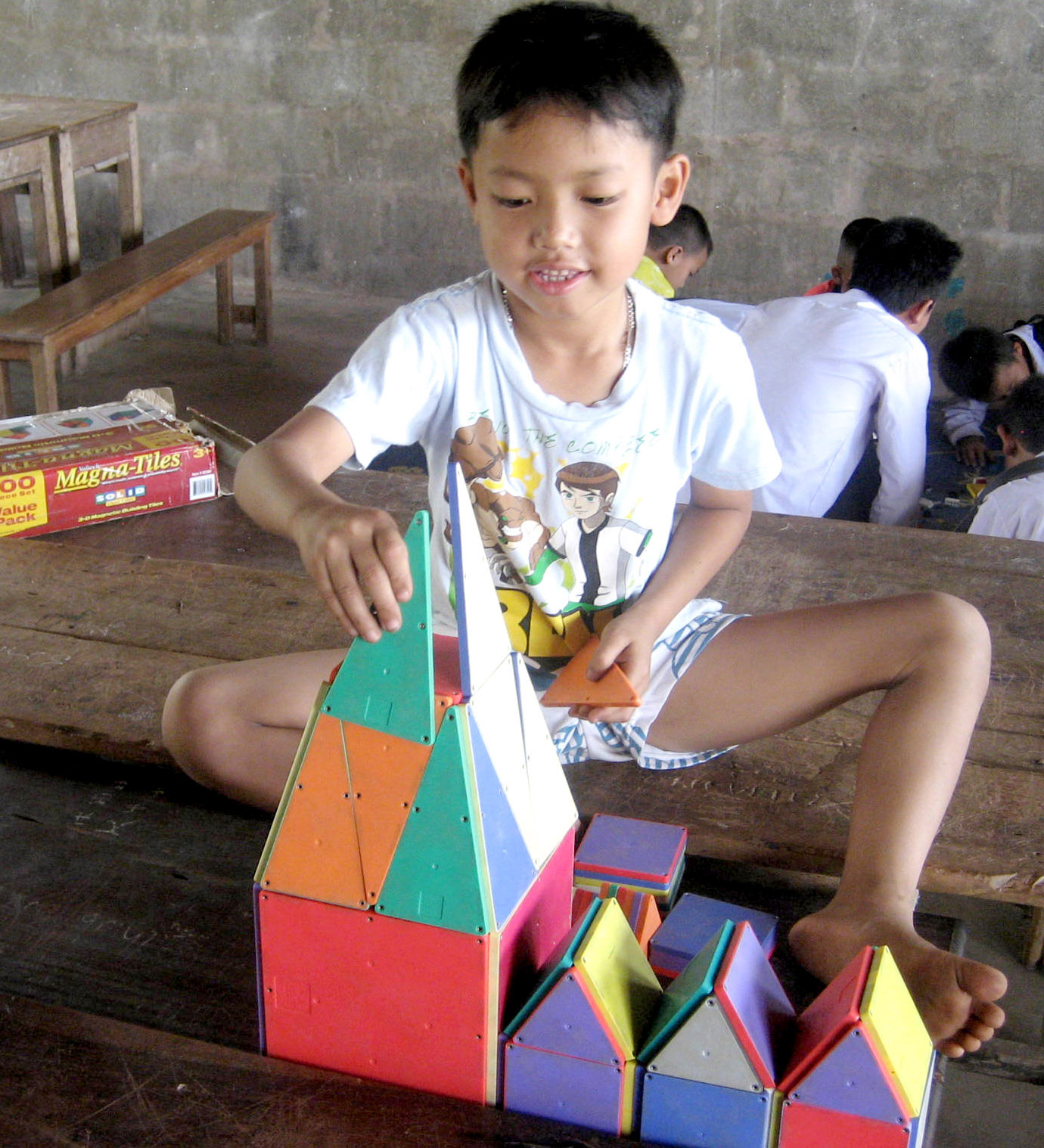
Child playing with Magna-Tiles

Magna-Tiles are a construction toy system. The pieces are plastic tiles of varying shapes that snap together magnetically, allowing users to build various geometric structures.

Magna-Tiles were originally developed in Japan, where they were sold under the name Pythagoras. American salesman Rudy M. Valenta saw the toy while visiting Japan in 1996 and bought the rights to the toy. He founded Valtech Co. in 1997 with his wife, Noriko, to bring the magnetic tiles sets to the US and world. At first, the product was launched in the US under the name Pythagoras but had little traction as the branding and name did not match the US Market It was quickly rebranded to Magna-Tiles and had the logo Pythagoras on the packaging for a few years to come before it was dropped permanently.

Sales began slowly, but by 2015 Magna-Tiles were being described as "ubiquitous" among young children in the United States. The New York Times and other publications have highlighted Magna-Tiles as a top toy.

Similar products include Magformers, Playmags, CONNETIX and Picasso Tiles.
