= Enterprise journalism =

Type of journalism

A journalist conducts an in-person interview with a subject and police officer.

Enterprise journalism is reporting that is not generated by news or a press release, but rather generated by a reporter or news organization based on developed sources. Tied to "shoe-leather" reporting and "beat reporting," enterprise journalism gets the journalist out of the office and away from the traditional news makers. It also enlists some of the traditional traits of good investigative reporting, such as reading documents.

The word enterprise has multiple meanings, but in the context of this topic, it pertains to an activity of importance that requires effort and planning. The style of enterprise journalism requires the reporter to find the story through discussing with sources and reporting directly from the sources. This course of action can help bring uncovered issues to light as enterprise journalism asks the reporter to speak with communities organically.

Enterprise journalism distinguishes itself from standard news reporting through the inclusion of first-hand reporting and narrative. The style of reporting asks reporters to rely on their own sources rather than press releases or other second-hand evidence. Narrative helps to build depth and a storyline for the article. Enterprise also differs from opinion pieces such as editorials and op-ed, despite the addition of narrative.

== Characteristics and distinction ==
Enterprise journalism does not involve reporting based purely on press releases or news conferences. Instead, this kind of reporting involves stories that are unearthed by reporters themselves; many people refer to these as 'scoops.' Enterprise extends beyond the coverage of events to examine their underlying causes and broader context.

As opposed to other forms of journalism, the main distinctions for enterprise journalism lie in two key aspects: first-hand reporting and the addition of narrative.

First-hand reporting sets the foundation for building an enterprise story. This type of reporting means the reporter has found the story organically either coincidentally or through common knowledge. Once an issue is recognized, first-hand reporting asks for the reporter to speak with sources involved directly. First-hand reporting differs from news reporting as the reporter is finding information themselves and do not rely on external sources.

Including narrative is another aspect of enterprise journalism, where nuance and depth is built around the people and setting the journalist is reporting on. Adding narrative is a characteristic that attempts to maintain readers' attention.

The addition of narrative can lead people to compare enterprise journalism with opinion writing, but the two are not synonymous. Opinion stories, such as editorials and op-eds can provide facts like many journalistic pieces, however the writer is given the freedom to provide their opinion. Op-eds typically have the lowest restrictions at a publication regarding voice and perspective. Whereas editorial pieces are typically required to follow methods and opinions that are consistent with the editorial board.

== In action ==
Staff at the Chicago Tribune were awarded The 2008 Pulitzer Prize in Investigative Reporting for surfacing issues in governmental regulation of children's products, such as toys and car seats. The flagship article of the series, "Not until a boy died," drew reader attention, highlighting harmful defects in the Magnetix toy. Their work spanned 10 articles in seven months, exposing toys containing harmful agents and safety devices that endangered the lives of children. Along with the award, the team was awarded $10,000. This series by the Chicago Tribune is an example of self-initiated reporting and independent data gathering, which follows suit with enterprise journalism.

== Further notes ==
The style of enterprise journalism can assume the writing of all or some of an article. While an article written fully to this form will contain only first-hand evidence found by the reporter and have narrative elements; journalists can still borrow characteristics, it just won't be a true enterprise piece.
