= New Democratic Party of Quebec candidates in the 1994 Quebec provincial election =

The New Democratic Party of Quebec fielded forty-one candidates in the 1994 Quebec provincial election, none of whom were elected.

== Candidates ==
(n.c.: no candidate)

Riding	Candidate's name	Gender	Votes	%	Rank
Abitibi-Est	n.c.				
Abitibi-Ouest	n.c.				
Acadie	n.c.				
Anjou	Richard Duval	M	537	2.01	4th
Argenteuil	n.c.				
Arthabaska	n.c.				
Beauce-Nord	Lise Rose	F	1,434	6,11	3rd
Beauce-Sud	Berthier Guay	M	856	2.95	4th
Beauharnois-Huntingdon	n.c.				
Bellechasse	n.c.				
Berthier	n.c.				
Bertrand	n.c.				
Blainville	n.c.				
Bonaventure	n.c.				
Borduas	n.c.				
Bourassa	n.c.				
Bourget	n.c.				
Brome-Missisquoi	n.c.				
Chambly	n.c.				
Champlain	n.c.				
Chapleau	Steve Fortin	M	984	2.47	3rd
Charlesbourg	Alain Brasset	M	811	2.13	4th
Charlevoix	n.c.				
Châteauguay	n.c.				
Chauveau	n.c.				
Chicoutimi	Gervais Tremblay	M	706	2.04	4th
Chomedey	n.c.				
Chutes-de-la-Chaudière	Mario Trépanier	M	834	2.05	5th
Crémazie	Ginette St-Amour	F	337	1.09	4th
D'Arcy-McGee	n.c.				
Deux-Montagnes	n.c.				
Drummond	n.c.				
Dubuc	n.c.				
Duplessis	n.c.				
Fabre	n.c.				
Frontenac	n.c.				
Gaspé	n.c.				
Gatineau	n.c.				
Gouin	Hans Marotte	M	1,428	4.66	3rd
Notes: Hans Marotte was also New Democratic Party candidate in Papineau—Saint-Denis in the 2000 federal election.
Groulx	n.c.				
Hochelaga-Maisonneuve	Hugues Tremblay	M	392	1.71	4th
Hull	n.c.				
Iberville	Jacques Rose	M	645	1.79	5th
Îles-de-la-Madeleine	n.c.				
Jacques-Cartier	n.c.				
Jeanne-Mance	n.c.				
Jean-Talon	Karl Adomeit	M	313	1.12	5th
Notes: Karl Adomeit was also New Democratic Party candidate in Louis-Hébert in the federal elections of 1993, 1997 and 2000.
Johnson	n.c.				
Joliette	n.c.				
Jonquière	n.c.				
Kamouraska-Témiscouata	André Bourgoin	M	717	2.95	4th
Labelle	n.c.				
Lac-Saint-Jean	n.c.				
LaFontaine	n.c.				
La Peltrie	n.c.				
La Pinière	n.c.				
Laporte	n.c.				
Laprairie	n.c.				
L'Assomption	n.c.				
Laurier-Dorion	Milan Mirich	M	409	1.23	4th
Notes: See the 2000 federal election for biographical notes for Milan Mirich.
Laval-des-Rapides	Richard Aubert	M	669	2.21	4th
Laviolette	n.c.				
Lévis	n.c.				
Limoilou	Jean-Pierre Duchesneau	M	938	2.76	5th
Lotbinière	n.c.				
Louis-Hébert	Jean-Guy Gagnon	M	415	1.27	5th
Marguerite-Bourgeoys	Claudine Ricard	F	392	1.15	5th
Marguerite-D'Youville	n.c.				
Marie-Victorin	n.c.				
Marquette	n.c.				
Maskinongé	n.c.				
Masson	n.c.				
Matane	n.c.				
Matapédia	n.c.				
Mégantic-Compton	n.c.				
Mercier	Renée-Claude Lorimier	F	815	2.63	5th
Notes: Renée-Claude Lorimier ran for the New Democratic Party at both the federal and provincial levels in the 1990s. She has a Bachelor of Arts degree and a Master of Arts degree in literature from the Université de Montréal, has worked as a teacher, and has been active with the Federation autonome du collegial. Electoral record: Election / Division / Party / Votes / % / Place / Winner; 1993 federal / Terrebonne / New Democratic Party / 900 / 1.07 / 4/5 / Benoît Sauvageau, Bloc Québécois; 1994 provincial / Mercier / New Democratic Party / 815 / 2.63 / 5/9 / Robert Perreault, Parti Québécois
Mille-Îles	n.c.				
Montmagny-L'Islet	Gaston Bourget	M	881	3.78	4th
Montmorency	Jean-Marie Fiset	M	2,875	7.05	3rd
Mont-Royal	Roland Morin	M	143	0.50	7th
Notes: See the 1985 election for biographical notes for Roland Morin.
Nelligan	n.c.				
Nicolet-Yamaska	n.c.				
Notre-Dame-de-Grâce	Marie Bertrand	F	406	1.37	5th
Orford	n.c.				
Outremont	Suzanne Boutin	F	453	1.45	4th
Papineau	n.c.				
Pointe-aux-Trembles	n.c.				
Pontiac	n.c.				
Portneuf	n.c.				
Prévost	Françoise Lemay	F	1,033	2.99	4th
Richelieu	n.c.				
Richmond	n.c.				
Rimouski	Manon Côté	F	1,556	5.36	3rd
Notes: Manon Côté was also the Québec solidaire candidate in the 2008 election in Kamouraska-Témiscouata.
Rivière-du-Loup	n.c.				
Robert-Baldwin	n.c.				
Roberval	n.c.				
Rosemont	Manon Leclerc	F	626	2.09	4th
Rousseau	Gilles Garneau	M	631	2.06	4th
Rouyn-Noranda–Témiscamingue	n.c.				
Saguenay	n.c.				
Sainte-Marie–Saint-Jacques	Jocelyne Dupuis	F	621	2.03	4th
Saint-François	n.c.				
Saint-Henri–Sainte-Anne	Serge Turmel	M	344	1.10	4th
Saint-Hyacinthe	Martin Imbleau	M	1,292	3.63	4th
Saint-Jean	Julien Patenaude	M	204	0.57	4th
Saint-Laurent	n.c.				
Saint-Maurice	n.c.				
Salaberry-Soulanges	Jean-Pierre Couillard	M	1,644	4.08	3rd
Sauvé	Denis Plante	M	453	1.81	4th
Shefford	n.c.				
Sherbrooke	n.c.				
Taillon	n.c.				
Taschereau	Serge Foisy	M	705	2.97	4th
Terrebonne	n.c.				
Trois-Rivières	n.c.				
Ungava	n.c.				
Vachon	n.c.				
Vanier	Paul Jean Malo	M	1,054	2.86	5th
Vaudreuil	n.c.				
Verchères	n.c.				
Verdun	Daniel Pharand	M	368	1.09	4th
Viau	Paul Montpetit	M	1,482	5.22	3rd
Viger	Jean-Guy Couture	M	1,485	5.09	3rd
Vimont	Denise Gagnon	F	1,142	2.70	4th
Westmount	Armand Vaillancourt	M	239	0.71	6th
