= Rasti =

Plastic construction toy

Rasti (from the German verb rasten, 'to secure, to place firmly, to lock into its place') is a construction toy made from plastic—similar to Lego, Tente and Mis Ladrillos—that was produced by the Knittax company in Argentina during the 1960s and 1970s. In 2007, manufacturing began again.

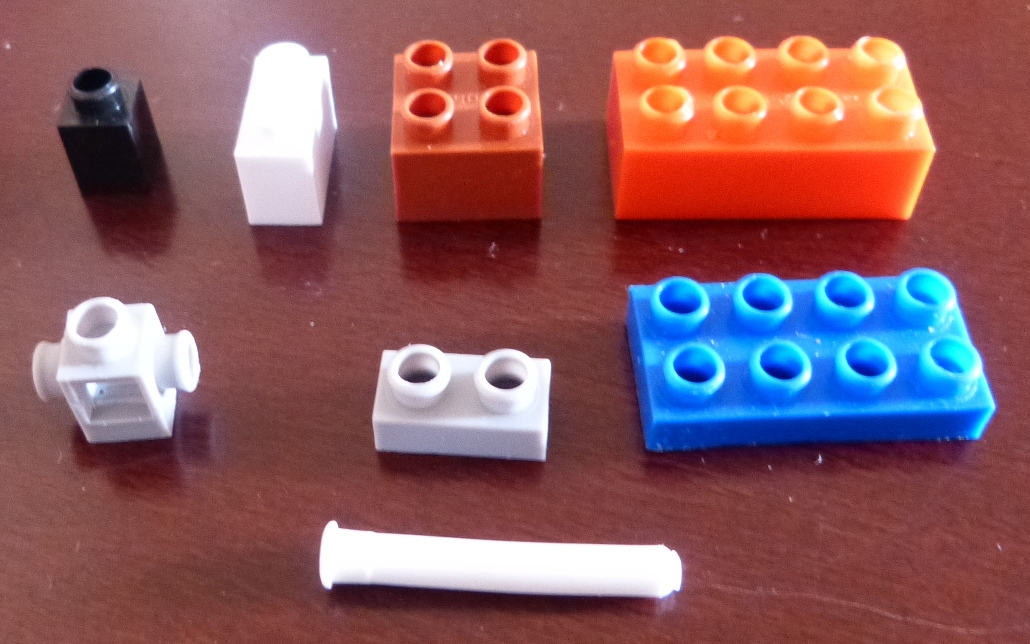
Various sizes of basic Rasti blocks

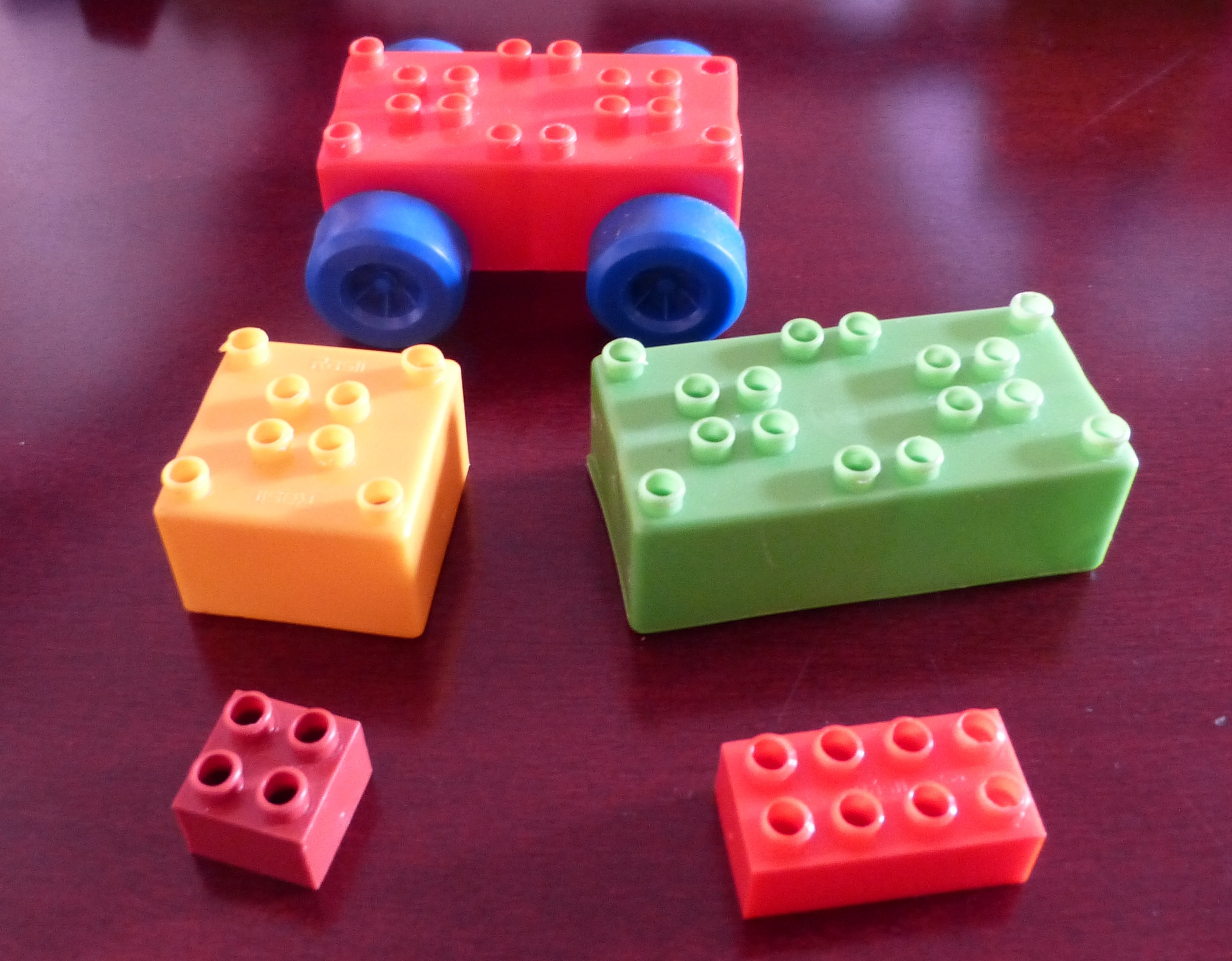
Rasti Junior blocks (top), compared against basic Rasti blocks (bottom)

== Construction ==
The construction method allows a person to join pieces by using medium pressure, locking the blocks together with semi-rigid plastic pins which, unlike other brands, avoids the friction and wear between the pins and the internal surfaces of the blocks. This system avoids fragility and instability in the models, giving a solidity unequaled by any other construction toy or block system.

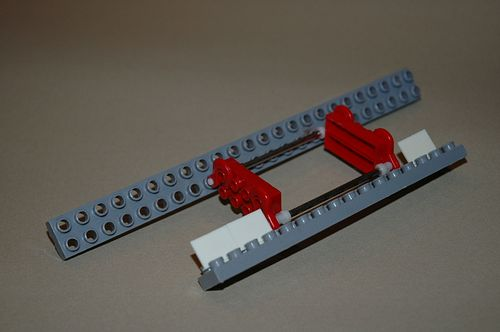
Construction with parts of the system

== Quality ==
Rasti bricks produced in Argentina were made with quality in mind—the shafts were made in chromed steel with plastic points for joining the special holes in the wheels. They were so popular that the word "Rasti" became regularly used as a synonym for durability and stability. It is still used as a generic noun to describe objects that can be assembled or disassembled in pieces saying: "it was broken like a Rasti" or "you can build it like a Rasti".

Having obtained a considerable popularity in the toy market in Argentina, the "Rasti" was exported to countries such as Canada and Germany (from where the original design came) until its production moved to Brazil where its license was granted to the company Hering, and remained in production for several years. The brand "Rasti" comes from the German word "rasten" which means "to affirm, to establish giving solidity, stability and firmness" which is the concept that governs the plastic blocks that are embedded to form various structures.

In Europe, with new colors but with the same basic pieces, the Rasti still continued selling after the new millennium (“Rasti-2000”). Between the more popular sets sold in the Rasti decades, there are the Minibox 600, the Multibox 800, the technical kits 501 and 502, the three variants of Rasti Mobil (202, 203 and 204), the Motobox 45 and its more complete version the Motobox 90, and the larger set, "Starbox 1000".

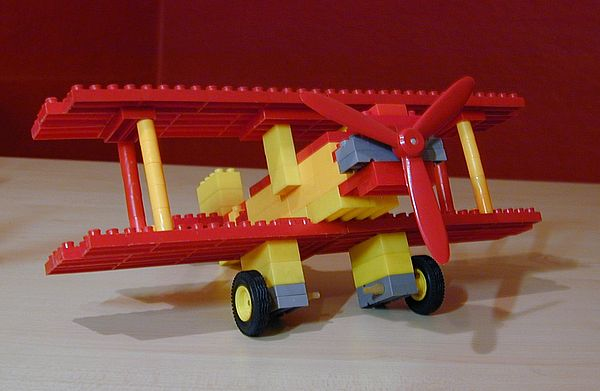
Model of Rasti Mobil 204
