= EXÍN Castles =

Construction toy

Original logo of the EXIN Castles/EXÍN Castillos Company

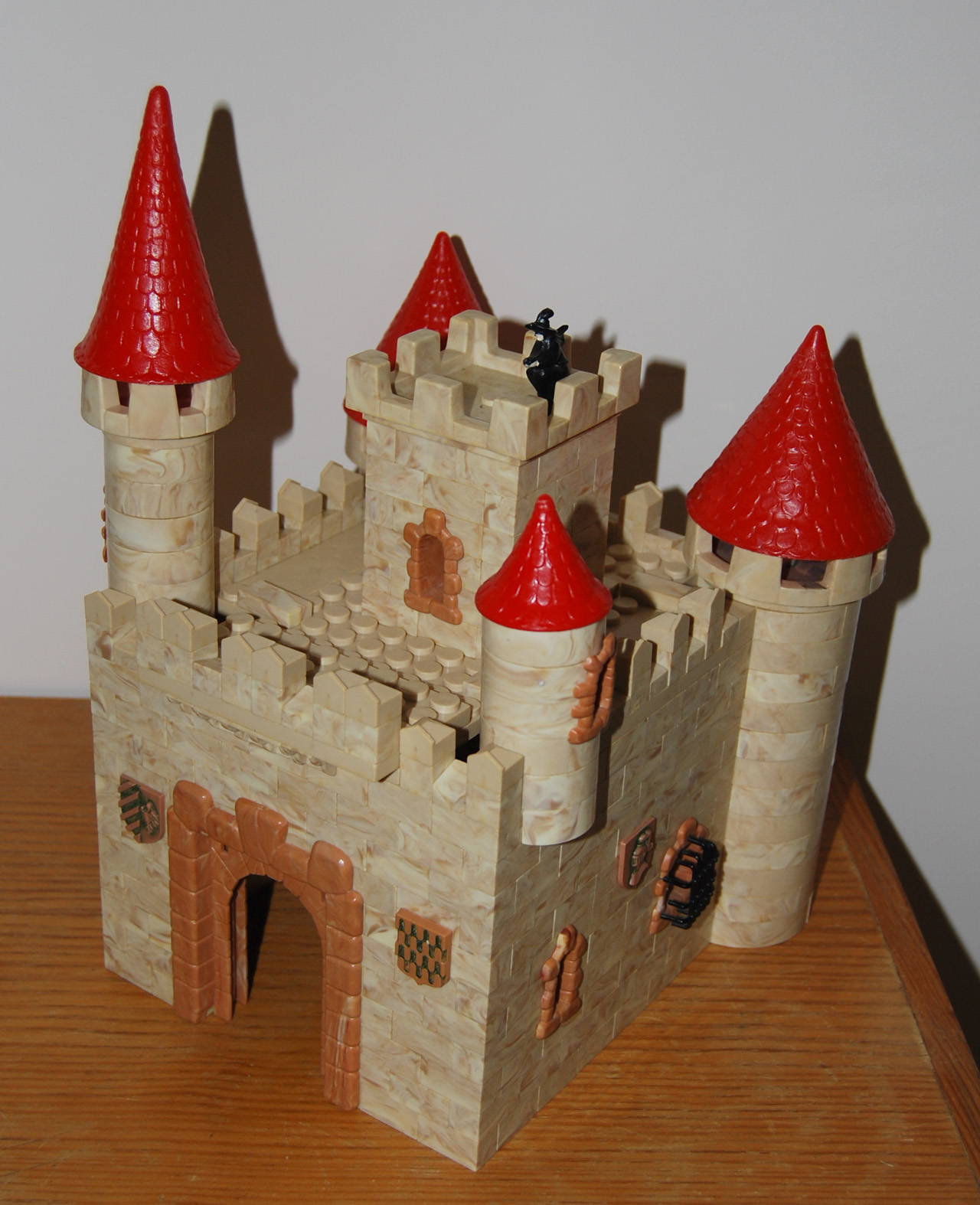
Example of an EXIN castle

EXÍN Castillos (or EXIN Castles) is a construction toy. First introduced by the Exin Lines Brothers in 1968 in Barcelona, Spain, this plastic block toy was designed for the construction of castle-like-buildings. The company has most recently produced Castle lines toys for the Shrek movie franchise and others.

The EXIN Castillos blocks are of a peg-and-socket design similar to Lego or EXIN's TENTE, though with larger pegs, and the most common size being a 1x2 design (whereas 2x4 is the most common Lego size). The blocks are usually a mottled light tan color, intended to resemble stone, although a few sets were produced using pale blue blocks instead, for a "fantasy" theme.

Beyond the standard blocks, additional specialized pieces in EXIN sets include arched top pieces for windows and doors, smooth caps to create battlements, single-piece tower tops and turret roofs to attach to those, wall-mounted torches and braziers, etc.

The existence of these specialized pieces made the EXIN blocks especially suitable for their particular role of building castles in the early 1970s, before Lego had anything similar. The later introduction of more specialized Lego sets in the late 1980s and onwards, which were equally well suited for such a task, yet still interoperable with generic Lego, gave increased competition to EXIN.

In 2014 NG Castillos was formed which 3D prints pieces for both existing Exin designs as well as new ones.

== Sources ==
- http://exincastillos.forogratis.es/portal.php
- EXIN CASTILLOS ¡ EL JUGUETE QUE HACE HISTORIA ! ... para construir mil y un castillos
- http://www.exincastillos.es/
- Eddie The Wild's EXIN Castillos Homepage
- Exin Castles
- https://web.archive.org/web/20100115011238/http://www.bluebon.net/victreas/exincastles.html
