= Magnetix =

Magnetic construction toy

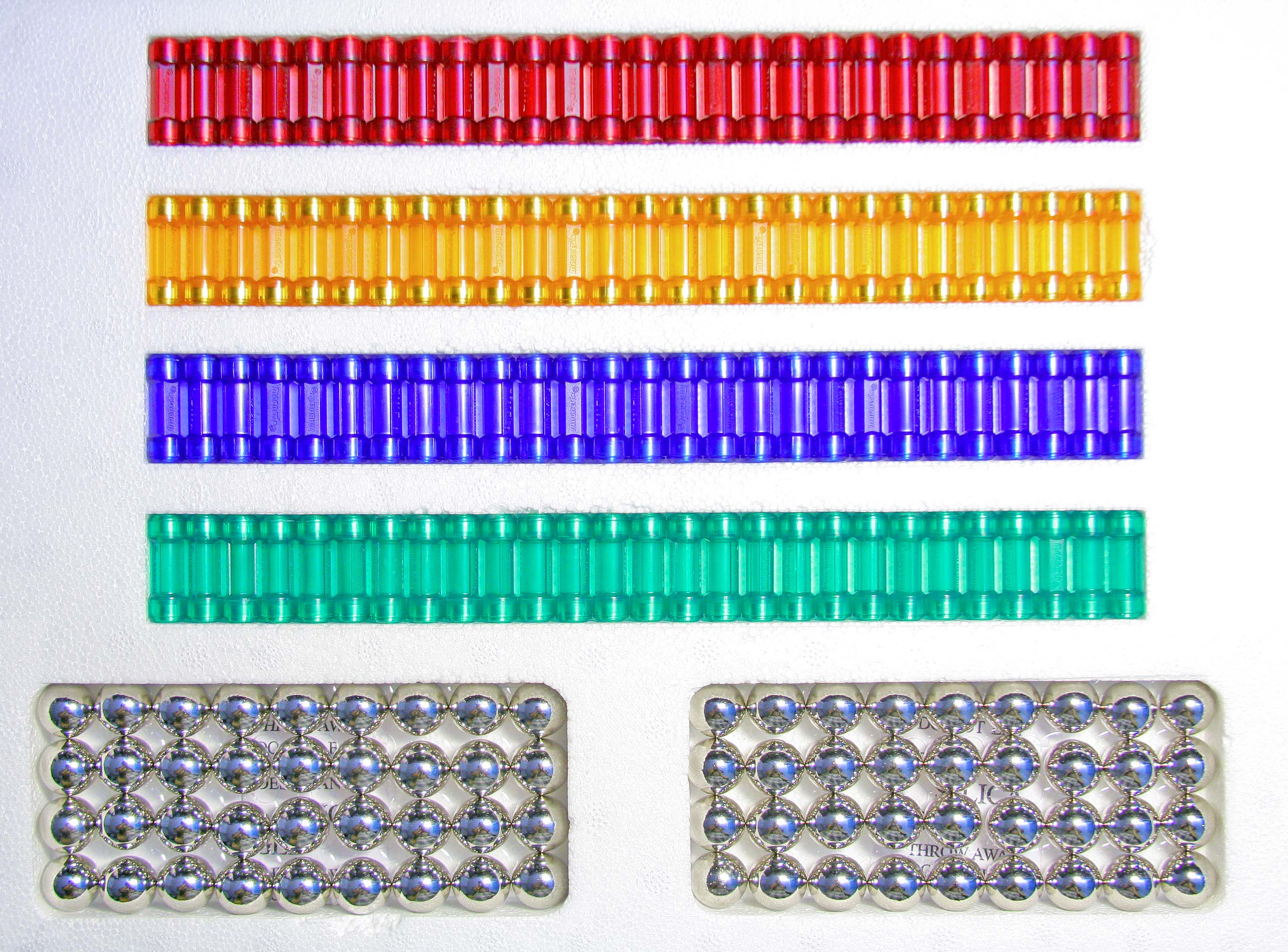
Magnetix "Translucents" 180-piece set

Magnetix is a magnetic construction toy that combines plastic building pieces containing embedded neodymium magnets, and steel bearing balls that can be connected to form geometric shapes and structures. Designed to be a cheaper version of the Geomag magnetic construction set, Magnetix's image suffered severely when an early manufacturing defect caused a death. It was sold under various brands after the defect was corrected.

== Design ==
The spheres are 0.588 in (14.9 mm) to 0.593 in (15.1 mm) in diameter (larger than Geomag), approximately 27.8 g (0.98 oz) in weight, and are prone to surface corrosion, unlike most other magnetic construction toys. The bars with magnets at each end are 27 mm (1.1 in) long, or 68 mm (2.7 in), or 53 mm (2.1 in) and flexible, or short rigid curves. Panel shapes include two types of interlocking triangles, interlockable squares, and circle or disks. The triangles and squares identify the north-south polarity of one of their embedded magnets. The disks identify all four magnets.

== Popularity ==
According to TD Monthly, a trade magazine for the toy industry, Magnetix sets were among the top 10 most-wanted building sets in 2005, and top sellers on web sites including Amazon.com, KB Toys.com, and Walmart.com.

== Product recalls ==
As early as 2004, medical professionals were warning the medical community about the dangers of "multiple magnet ingestion", but the case studies never made it into the popular press. A pediatric gastroenterologist, Dr. Marsha Kay of the Cleveland Clinic, was one of the first to publish an article on steps to take if a child is suspected of swallowing a magnet.

On March 31, 2006, the U.S. Consumer Product Safety Commission (CPSC) ordered a recall of all Magnetix brand magnetic building sets. The official CPSC recall notice was issued after the death of a small child and four serious injuries requiring surgery. "Consumers should stop using recalled products immediately unless otherwise instructed," according to the recall notice. Other brands of magnetic builders, such as Geomag were not recalled.

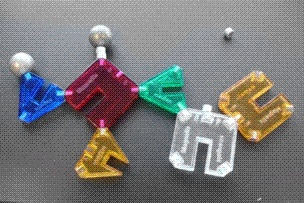
Recalled Magnetix toy with loose magnets

On April 19, 2007, CPSC ordered further Magnetix recalls, recalling over 4 million sets.

To date, CPSC and Mega Brands are aware of one death, one aspiration and 27 intestinal injuries. Emergency surgical intervention was needed in all but one case. At least 1,500 incidents of magnets separating from the building pieces have been reported. ... If a child swallows more than one tiny powerful magnet detached from the plastic building pieces or one such magnet and a metallic object, the objects can attract to each other inside the intestines and cause perforations and/or blockage, which can be fatal, if not treated immediately.

Redesigned Magnetix sets sold since March 31, 2006, age-labeled 6+, were not subject to the recall.
