= Cleversticks =

Plastic construction toy manufactured in the UK

Cleversticks is a plastic construction toy manufactured in the UK.

== The "Cleversticks Construction System" ==
The original design manufactured in polypropylene used sticks with pairs of jaws on each end and rings, the jaws connect onto the body of the sticks or rings, The jaws also connected the sticks end to end. The resulting toy was best suited to young children; with these few components, a wide range of models could be assembled. Squares, triangles, rectangles and hexagon shapes were later added to allow the toy to be used for sorting into sets; the toy could now be used in primary education. Technical shapes were added to increase the complexity of the toy and appeal to older children. The most recent additions utilise the new patented design manufactured in Acrylonitrile butadiene styrene (ABS) including wheels with tyres manufactured in Santoprene, a synthetic rubber.

== Patent, registered design, and trademark ==
The first patent in the UK GB 8313507 has a priority date of May 17, 1983, a US patent No 4548590 was granted in October 1985. The most recent UK patent GB2417434 was granted on 24 February 2009. The following registered designs have also been obtained: UK No 2066049, UK No 2106334, Ger No 40204339.1, Aus 1447/2002 and UK No 3019498. The name CLEVERSTICKS was registered under the No 1557320K, as a GB trademark in December 1993.
