= Pontiki =

Construction toy

Pontiki (ポンチキ, Ponchiki) is a construction toy for building models of unusual creatures (which are also referred to as pontiki). Pontiki are constructed from colourful plastic components of two different types: a hollow shape dotted with holes, for representing the creatures' bodies, and smaller parts which fit into the holes, for representing features such as eyes and limbs.

The body parts come in four standard shapes, a cube, a cylinder, a cone and an egg. They can be divided into sections and combined with the body parts of other pontiki. In addition to the standard pontiki, there is a pontiki with a pull-back car for a body, called Chovica, and a six-legged moving pontiki, called Pootiki.

Pontikis may also have three kinds of rare mini pontikis called parasites. One of the most common is Parapara, a dog-like mini pontiki. The others are a human-like mini pontiki called Eric and the rarest another one armed human-like mini pontiki called Tabcuo.

== See also ==
- Mr. Potato Head
