= Geomag =

Magnetic toy

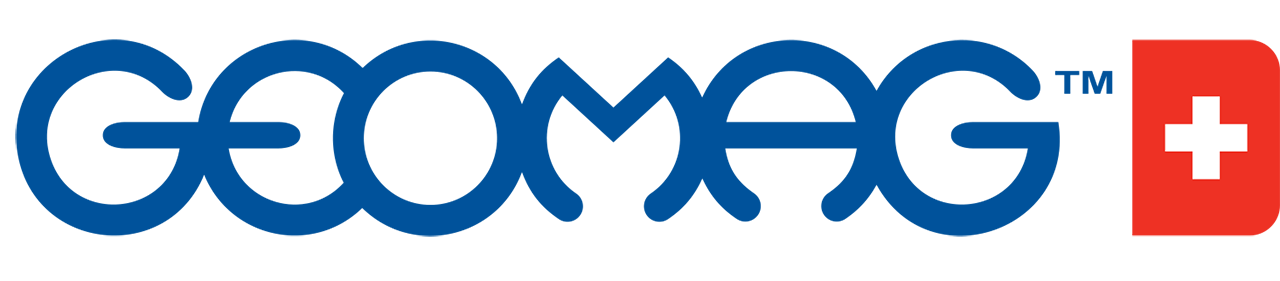
- Founder: Claudio Vicentelli
- Country of Origin: Switzerland
- Founded: 1998
- IP Owner: Geomag
- Manufacturer: Geomag
- Website: Official website

Geomag, stylized as GEOMAG, is a magnetic construction toy consisting of a collection of bars, each set with a neodymium alloy magnet at both ends, connected by a magnetic plug coated with polypropylene, and nickel-coated metal spheres. These elements interlock using magnetism, allowing for them to be assembled in various ways.

Geomag was created in May 1998 by Claudio Vicentelli. Geomag products are manufactured by Geomagworld SA, based in Novazzano, Switzerland. To align with the 2009/48/EC law's nickel content regulations for toys, the design was adjusted to feature spheres coated with a bronze alloy.

== Invention and Patent ==
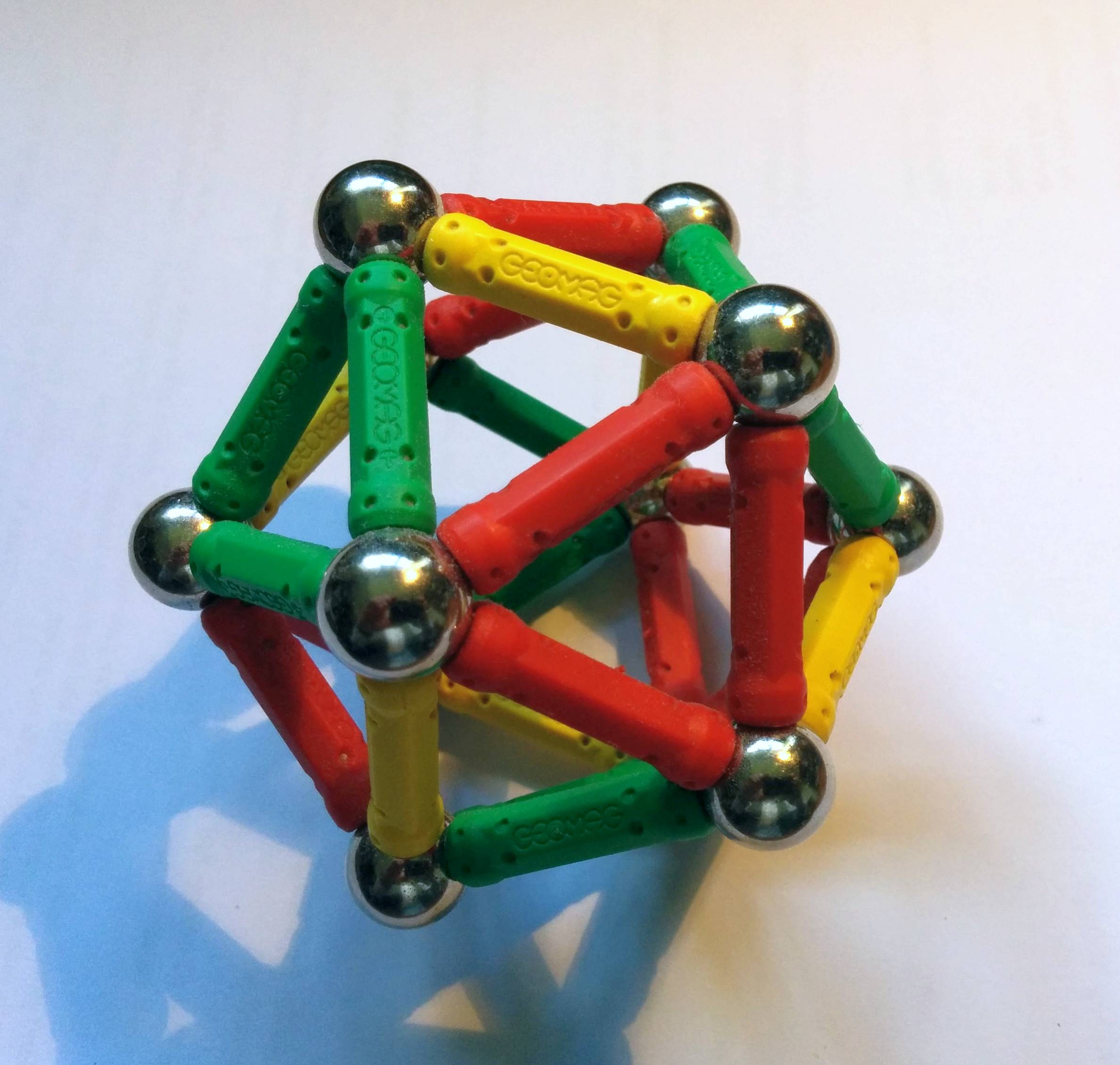
An icosahedron constructed with Geomag rods and spheres

In May 1998, Claudio Vicentelli, a specialist in practical applications of permanent magnets, patented the concept of Geomag.

The patented design outlines the setup of the Geomag bars, which incorporate a metal pin that connects two magnets positioned at opposite ends, along with metallic spheres. The primary objective of this configuration was to minimize the use of magnetic material, thereby reducing production expenses.

== Global Expansion of Geomag ==
Geomag made its debut in the Italian toy chain store Città del Sole in 1999. In 2000, Geomag appeared in several toy fairs in Milan, Nuremberg, and New York. Differences in vision for the development of the toy led Vicentelli and the Sardinian toy manufacturer Plastwood, which had marketed and produced Geomag, to end their partnership in 2002.

In 2003, Geomag SA began producing Geomag in the Swiss canton of Ticino. This company introduced more elements to the toy, such as panels made of semi-transparent colored polycarbonate (triangular platforms, rhombi, squares, and pentagons), used for decorative and structural support purposes. A European patent for the stabilising panel system, naming Claudio Vicentelli as the inventor, was granted in 2004.

In 2004, the G-Baby line, aimed at younger children, was introduced, featuring magnetic cubes and half-spheres with magnetic faces.

International regulators such as ASTM USA and the European Commission instituted a rule dictating that products small enough to fit within a test cylinder could only be sold to children aged 14 and above. Consequently, the original Geomag bars were elongated to 58 mm from their initial 27 mm length. The original Geomag variant was renamed to Geomag PRO, with an age designation of 14 and above.

Geomag SA ceased operations in November 2007, but was revived by entrepreneurs in 2008, who established Geomagworld SA. In 2009, Geomagworld SA began to produce 58 mm magnetic bars in compliance with the European Standard EN71. These bars formed the foundation for the product lines targeted to small children (ages +3), and incorporated colour variations (bars and spheres) and panels (bars, spheres, and reinforcement panels for both decorative and structural use).

The original 27 mm bars, still in production, were rebranded as the Geomag PRO line, comprising pro-colour, pro-metal, and pro-panel variants.

== Awards ==
- 2002 Parents' Choice Award "Geomag"
- 2004 Dr. Toy "The Best Advice on Children’s Products" Geomag - Color - 44 pcs
- 2004 Gold Award Winners Nappa
- 2004 Parents' Choice Award "Geomag Color 96 Kit"
- 2004 Parents' Choice Award "Geomag Panel 125 Kit"
- 2004 Toy Retailer Association "Construction Toy of the Year"
- 2005 Oppenheim Toy Portfolio Best Toy Award Gold Seal
- Parents' Choice Award "Geomag Pastelles 42"
- 2005 Parents' Choice Award "Magnetic Challenge"
- 2005 Tillywig Toy & Media Awards "G333 Glow Moon Explorer"
- 2005 TOTY "Special toy of the year"
- 2006 Parents' Choice Award "Geomag Dynamic Master"
- 2006 Kids Superbrand
- 2012 Editors' Recommended Specialty Toy "GEOMAG E-Motion Power Spin 24 pc"
- 2012 Editors' Recommended Specialty Toy "Geomag Pink - 66 pc"
- 2012 Space Age Award in the category 'Little Scientists.' "Geomag GLOW Moon Explorer"
- 2013 Editors' Recommended Specialty Toy "KOR Geomag - Aki"

== Tallest Geomag Tower ==
The tallest Geomag tower was built on live television in 2023. Dragan Pejovski and his sons, 13-year-old Ilija and 8-year-old Luka, broke the record, which now stands at 3.46 m (11.35 ft).

== See also ==
- Magnetix
