= Clementoni =

Italian toy company

Clementoni S.p.A.
- Type: Private
- Industry: Manufacturing
- Founded: 1957; 69 years ago in Recanati, Italy
- Founder: Mario Clementoni
- Headquarters: Recanati, Italy
- Area served: Italy
- Key people: Giovanni Clementoni (CEO)
- Products: Toys; Board games
- Number of employees: 600 (2017)
- Website: www.clementoni.com

Clementoni S.p.A. is an Italian company which deals with the production of educational toys.

It is based in Recanati, Italy.

== History ==
The company was founded in 1963 by Mario Clementoni (1925 in Potenza Picena – 2012 in Recanati) who, after an experience in the world of musical instruments in Pesaro, decided to start producing a product that was still little known in Italy at the time: the board game. He started the business with his wife Matilde and a few people who worked by hand, in an artisanal way. The first game was the "Tombola of the Song", linked to the most famous songs of the period. In 1967, he obtained an important commercial success with the presentation on the market of the boxed game Sapientino.

In 2017 the company developed the Sapientino Doc robot as part of the project A scuola di coding con Sapientino, which it promoted in Italian schools.

== Archive ==
The Clementoni archive is kept in Recanati, at the company's headquarters, and collects data from 1963–2011. It is divided according to company activity: research and development, marketing, administration, personnel. The documentation relating to the "molds" (molding on plastic material carried out at the Contrada Santa Croce plant) and to the advertising production is filed in electronic format and accompanied by photographs.
