= FAC System =

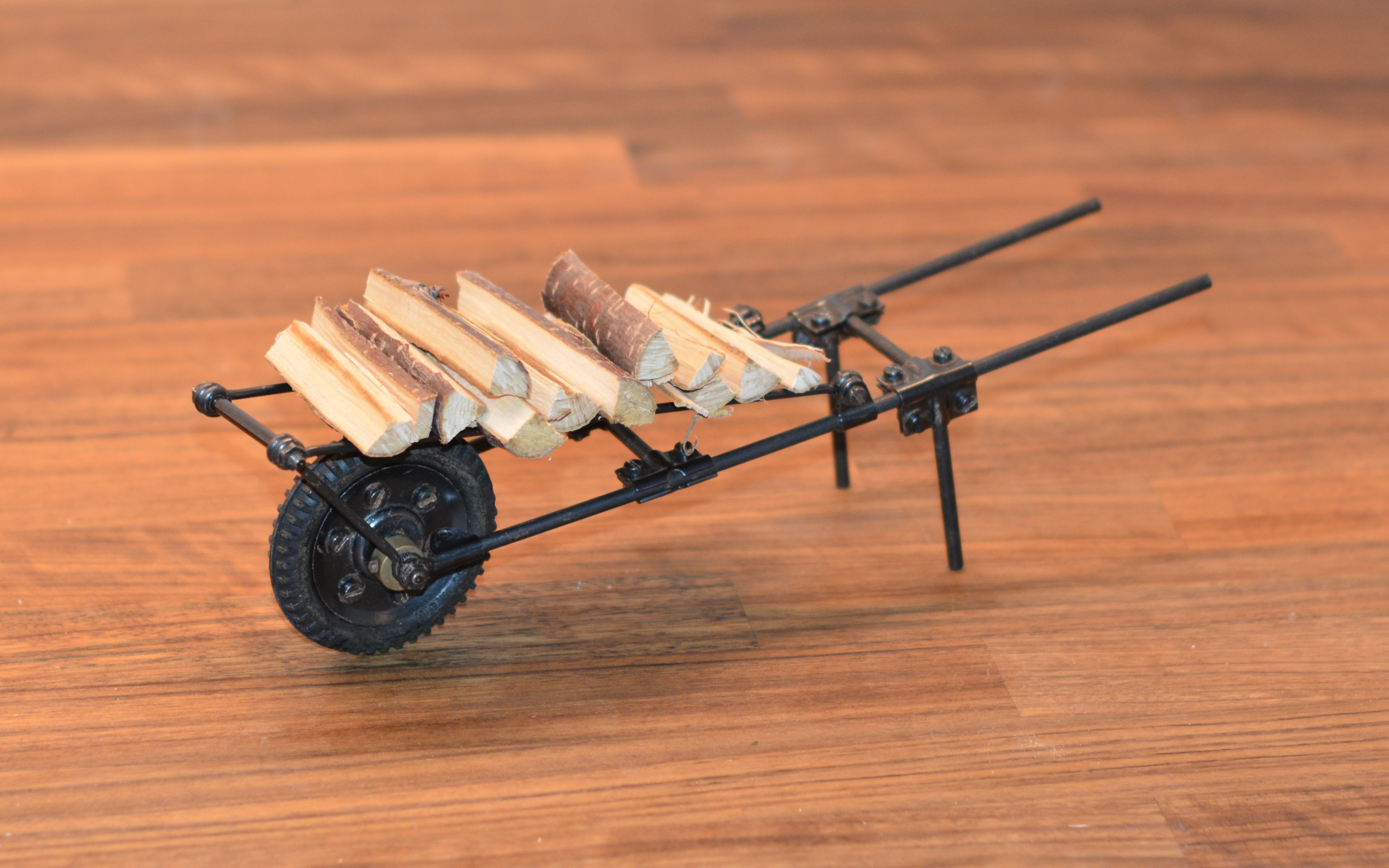
Model of a wheelbarrow in FAC System

FAC System is a mechanical construction set, invented by Swedish artist Mark Sylwan and launched in 1952. It uses metallic parts, and extensively uses 4 mm steel rod. The company continued in business as of 2013, supplying kits stated to give industry a basic construction system which gives the same freedom in 3D design as is available from the drawing board and CAD/CAM. Kits are suitable, and priced as, for laboratory work and teaching.

Shafts have a diameter of 6 mm, and have a groove along the shaft. Gears or other wheels have a bevel on either side of the hub of the wheel. A special sheet metal angle fits into this chamfer, and when the wheel is mounted on an axle, this sheet metal angle will fit into the groove on the axle. The design allows the wheel to be fixed on the axle and the stop screws on the wheel only have the task of ensuring that the wheel does not move along the axle.

== See also ==
- Meccano
