= Kid Spark Education =

American Toy Company

- Company type: Nonprofit organization
- Genre: STEM Education Products
- Predecessor: Rokenbok Education
- Founder: Paul Eichen
- Headquarters: San Diego, California, United States
- Products: Mobile STEM Labs
- Website: https://kidsparkeducation.org/

Kid Spark Education (previously known as Rokenbok Education and originally as The Rokenbok Toy Company) is a nonprofit organization that develops and produces affordable Mobile STEM Labs and curriculum for Schools and Youth Service Organizations. The Rokenbok Toy Company was founded in 1995 by Paul Eichen in the United States to create an heirloom quality toy system. The first Rokenbok toys debuted at the 1997 American International Toy Fair in New York City. In 2010 the company made a substantial push researching the effect of media, like Rokenbok, on developing minds. In 2015 the company transitioned into a 501(c)(3) and completed the development of their first 4 classroom specific products called Mobile STEM Labs. Since then, Kid Spark Education has placed Mobile STEM Labs in over 22 states across the country.

Kid Spark Education has focused on developing applied technology and engineering learning experiences for K-8 students. They also provide free or subsidized Kid Spark Education programs to schools and youth organizations serving underserved children. Much of Kid Spark's work is focused on designing professional development tools that allow teachers and youth services providers to become confident STEM mentors.

== History ==
The Rokenbok Toy Company was founded in 1995 by Paul Eichen in the United States. In 2008 the company transitioned their sales to be nearly entirely online, due to the closure of many toy stores during the great recession. Videos were created for YouTube to act as marketing for the company, to not only demonstrate the products, but also how they could be combined to create larger builds. In 2015 the company transitioned to a 501(c)(3) not-for-profit. Around 2017 all chutes and vehicles (with exception to the Maker ROK-Bot) were discontinued.

== Rokenbok Overview ==
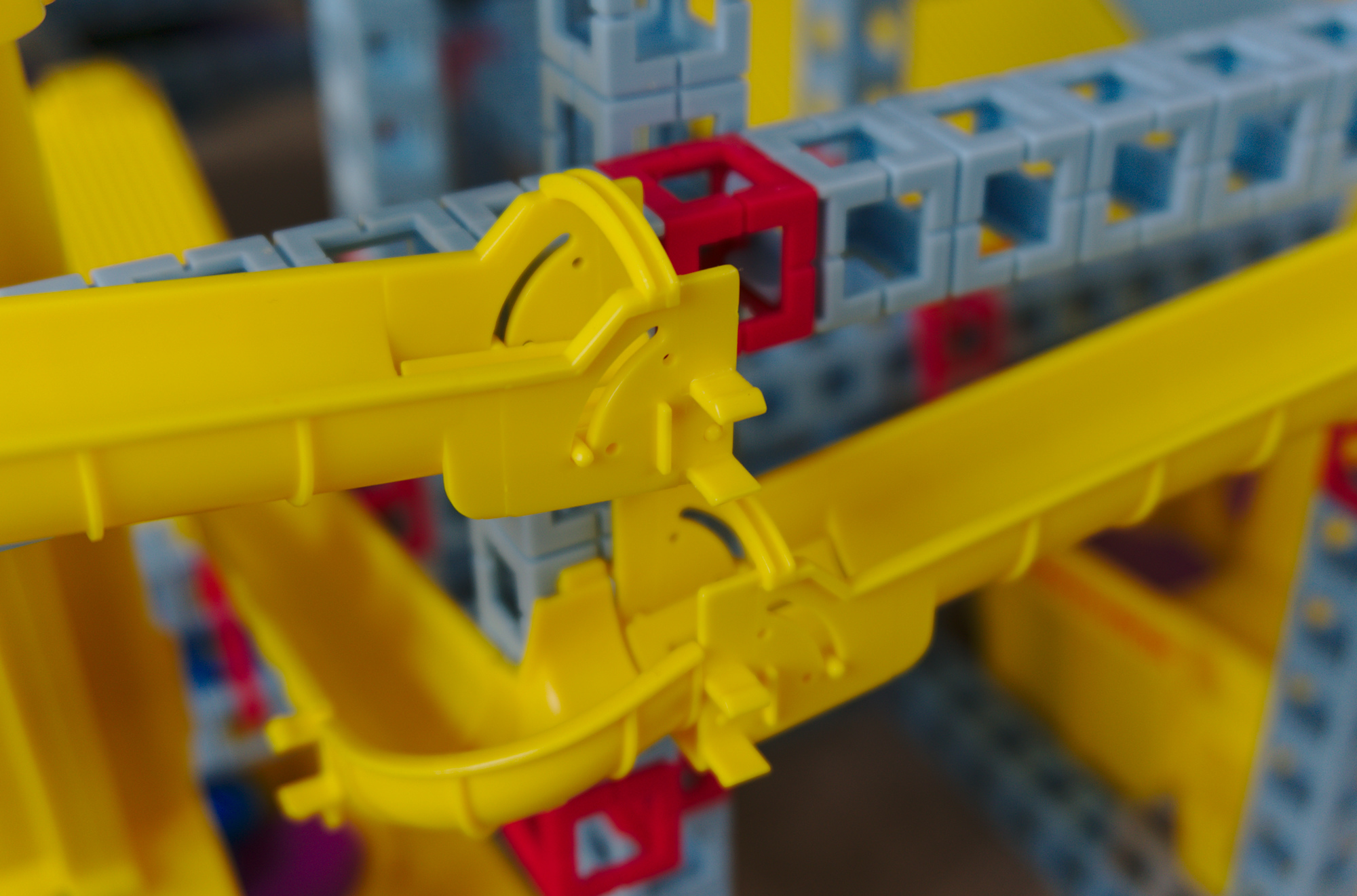
Beams and chutes

Rokenbok was an educational toy that combined a modular construction system with interactive infrared controlled vehicles. The system was expandable and could be added to and modified. Certain surfaces and platforms used in the Rokenbok constructions had a round-stud surface, making the toy compatible with Lego.

Rokenbok featured multiplayer; up to four players can operate any of up to eight vehicles simultaneously. There were many different manufactured vehicles. Each player could operate a vehicle by themselves. Control of the vehicles used a controller similar to those of video game consoles with a D-pad for directional control and special function buttons and shoulder buttons for other functions. Rokenbok was non-violent by reinforcing cooperative play patterns that engage children in a positive way. Rokenbok did not use licensed characters or cartoons.

== Vehicles ==
The original Construction vehicles included the Loader, Dozer, and TransGripper and Cargo Trailer.

The Metropolitan vehicles introduced a few years later included the Power Sweeper, Skip Track, and Emergency Speedster.

In 2000, the Elevator was released along with the Monorail system.

The Tower Crane began production in 2001.

Rokenbok began a redesign of their product line in 2002. This included products that were more reflective of real-world construction sites and included a more realistic color scheme. The Loader and Dozer were recolored. The Forklift, ROK lift, and Night Shift Trailer were also introduced. A simpler version of the loader, known as the Dump Truck, was produced for younger children.

For a short time, Rokenbok produced the Police Defender and Fire and Rescue set.

With the release of the engineering-oriented products came the X2 Power Unit, which could be used to drive various machines such as drawbridges and lifts.

The final lineup included: Dump Truck, Loader, Dozer, Power Sweeper, X2 Power Unit, Forklift, ROK Lift, Night Shift Trailer, and Skip Track.

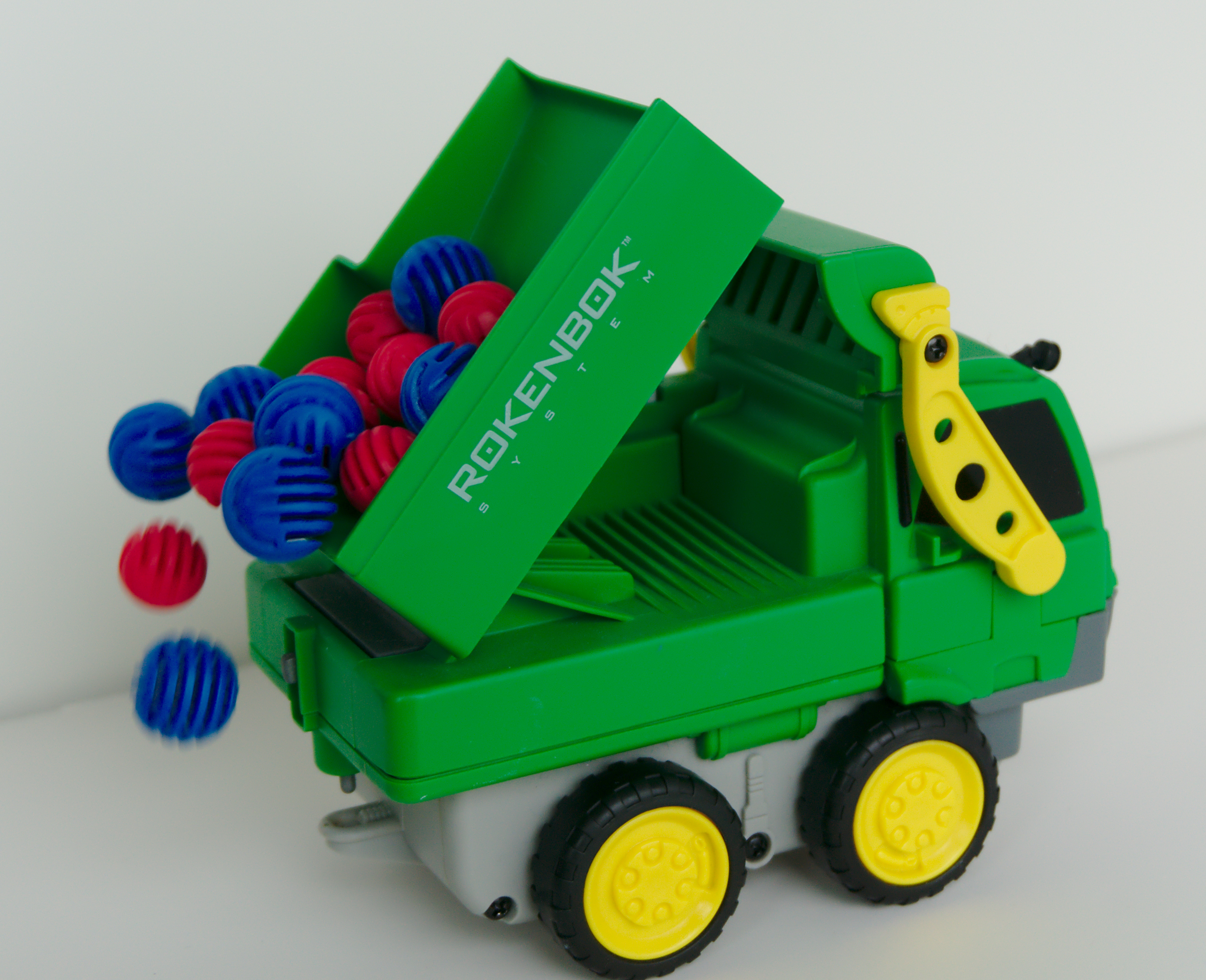
RC Loader

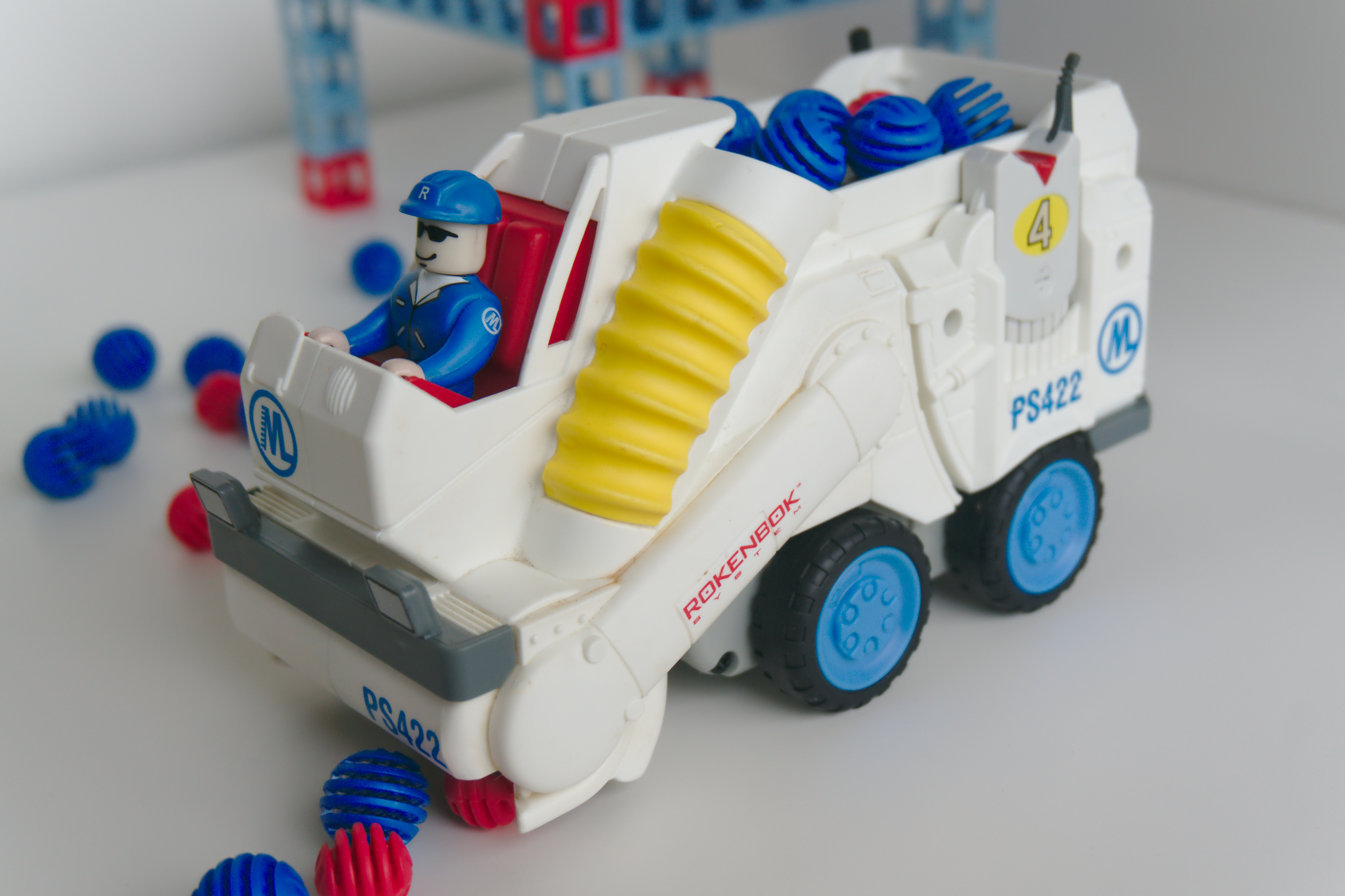
RC Sweeper

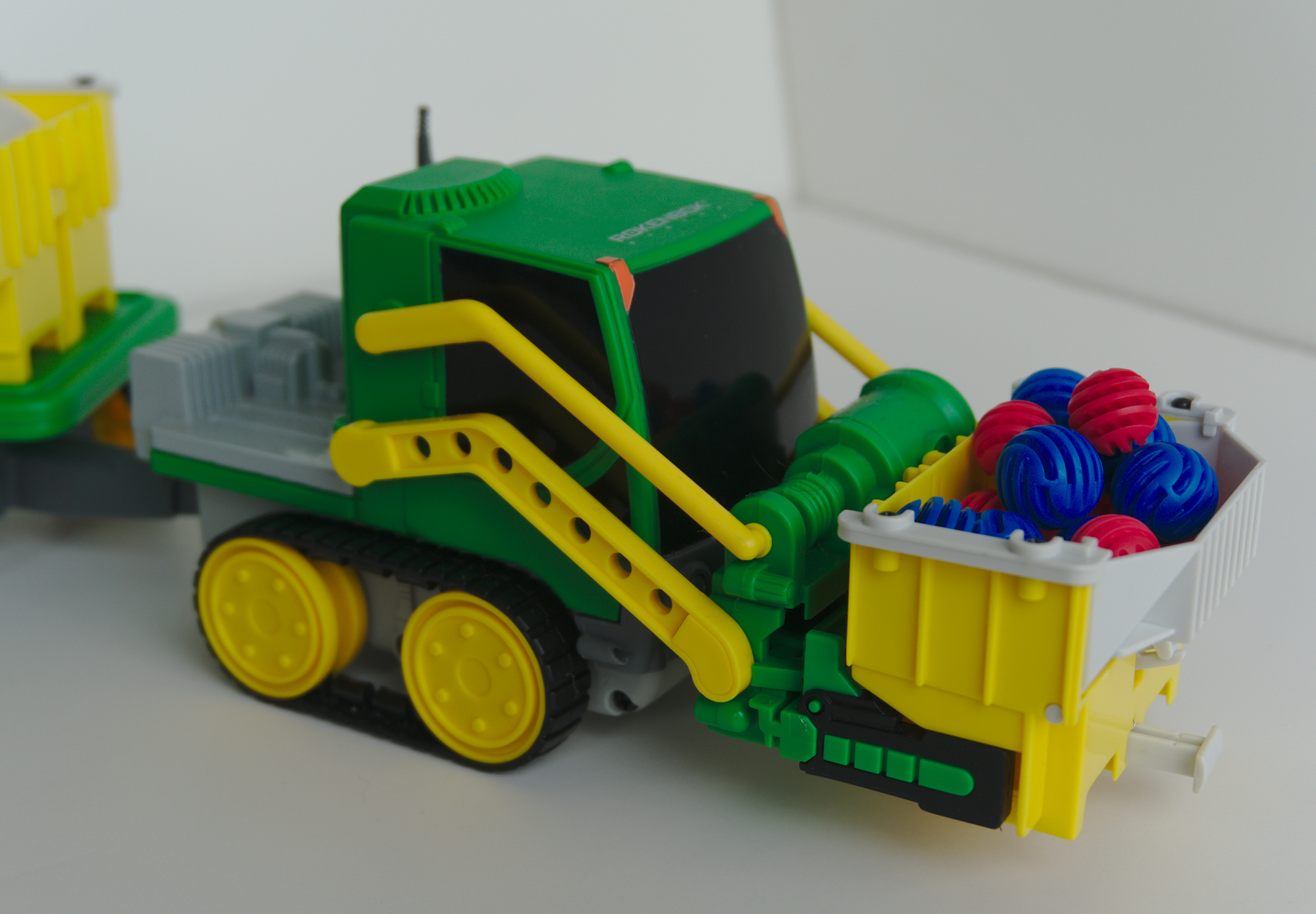
RC TransGripper

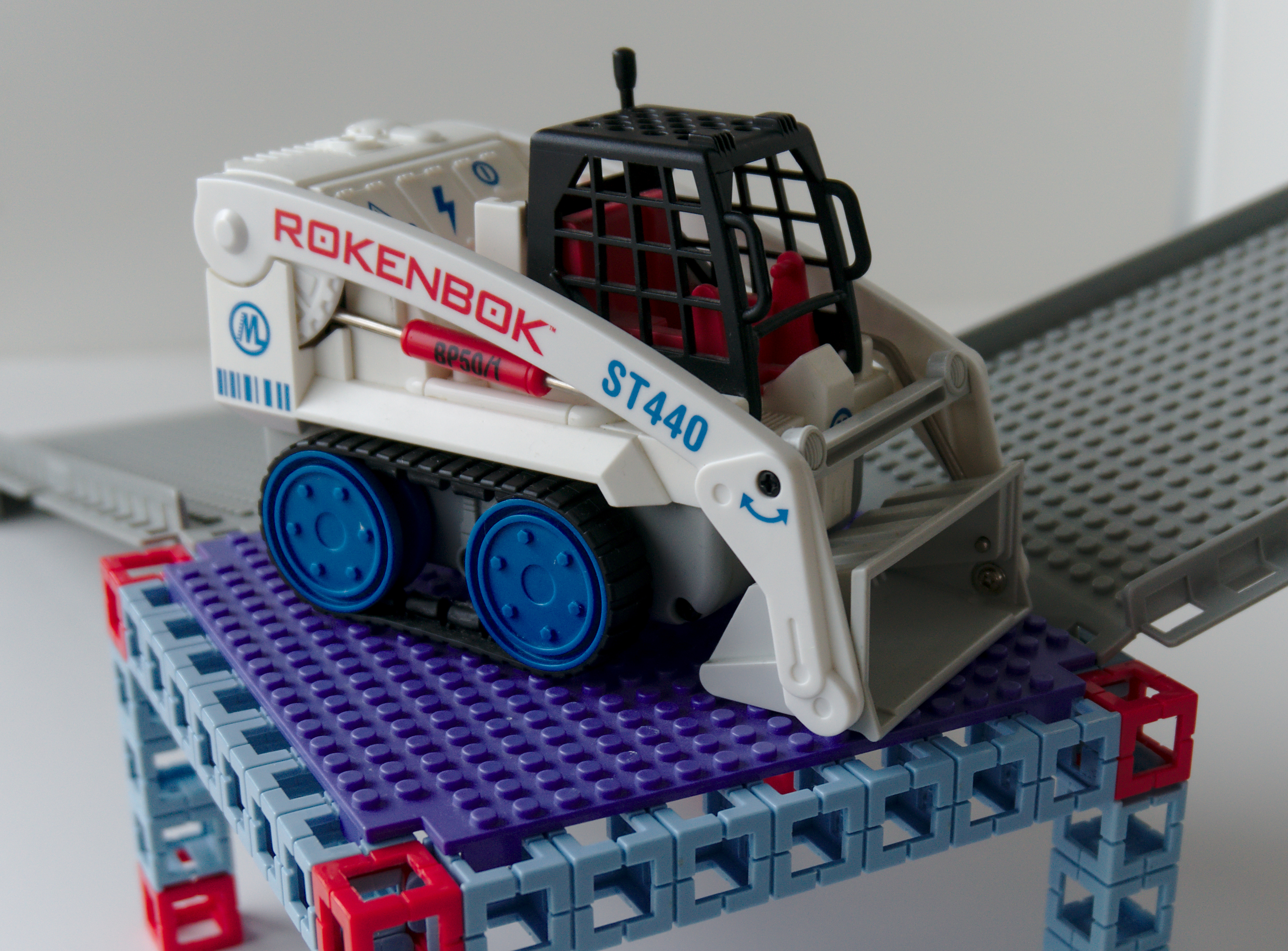
RC Skip Track

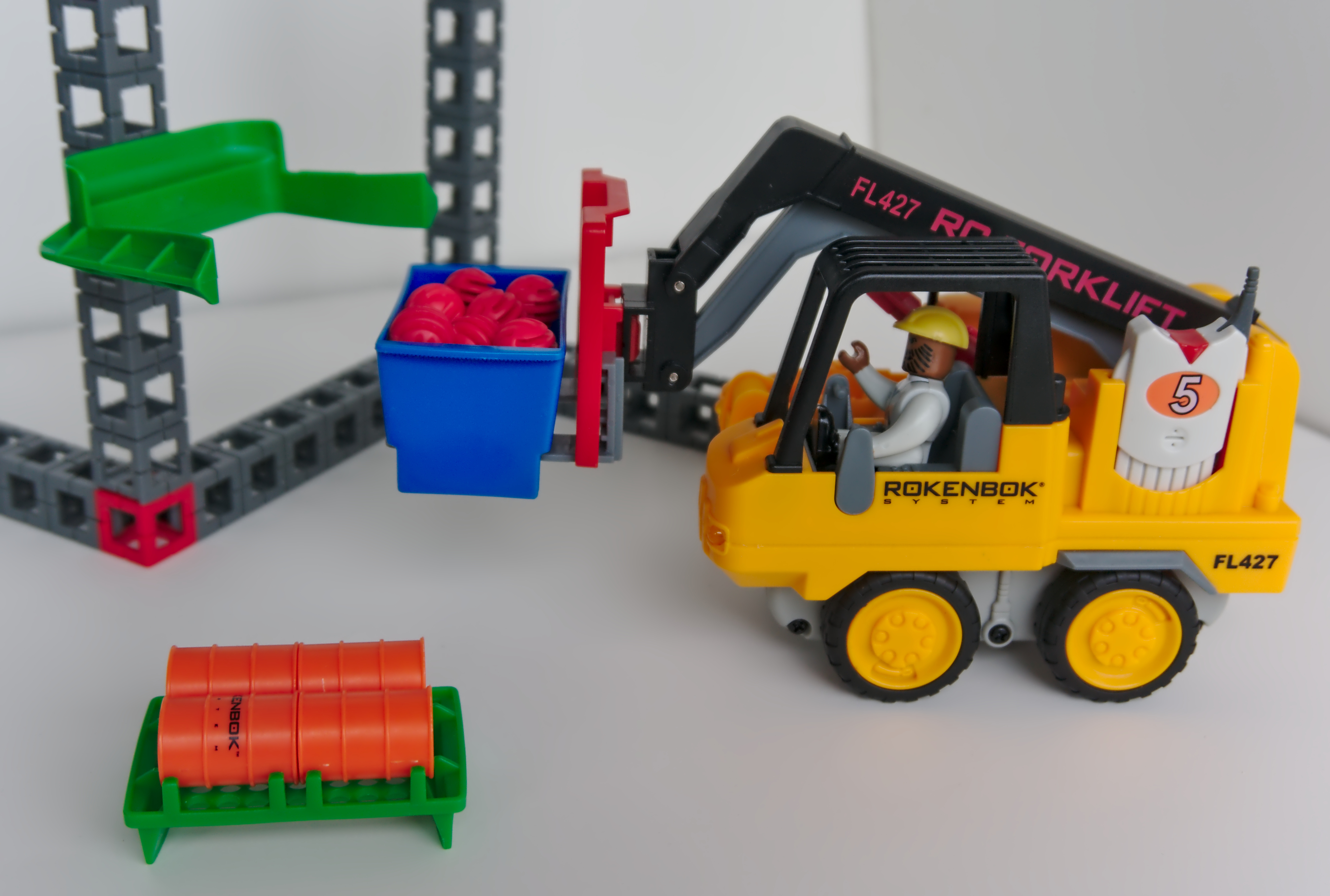
RC Forklift

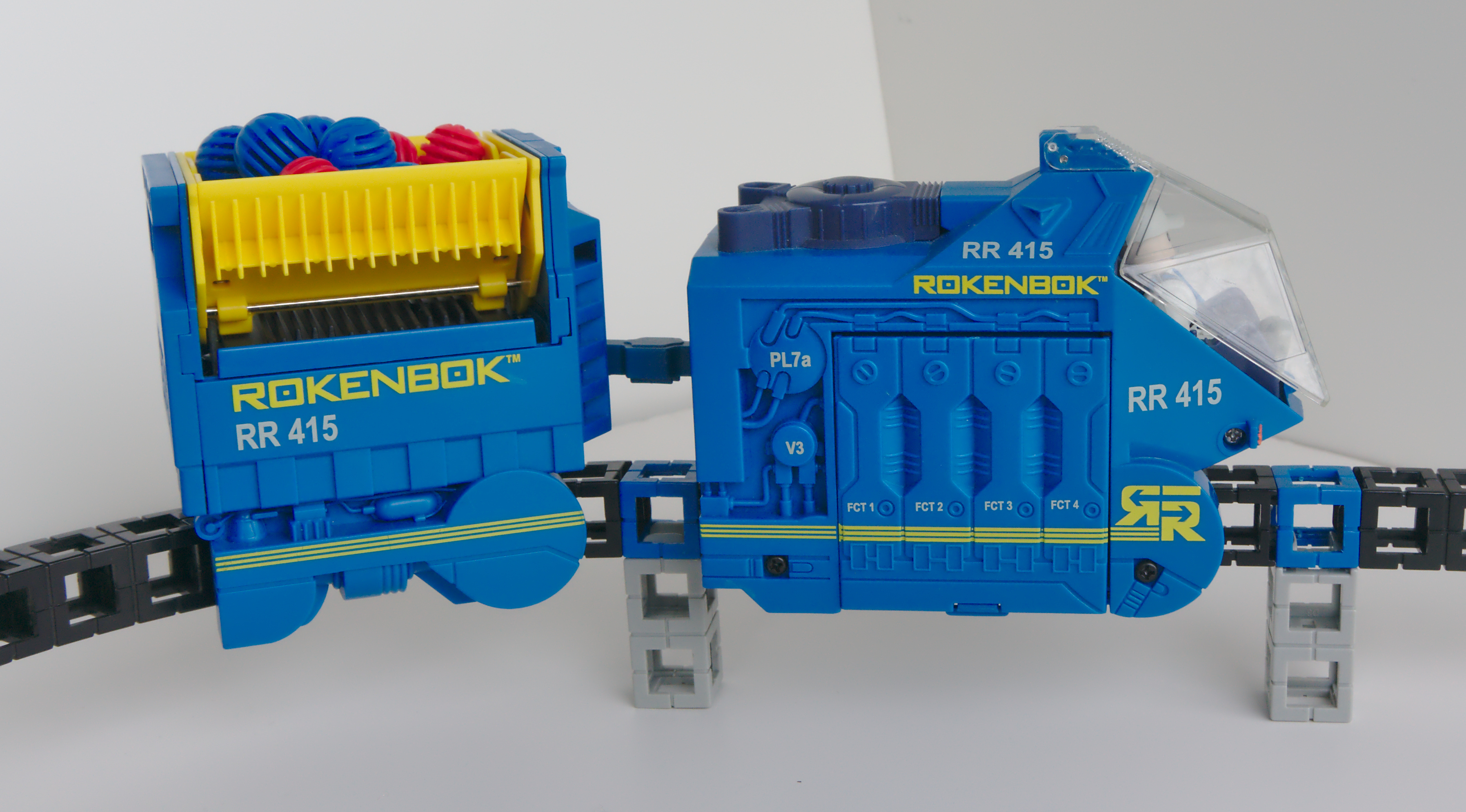
RC Monorail

== Action accessories ==
=== ROK-Lift ===
The Power ROK-Lift was a Rokenbok an elevator-like accessory which was used to take a large load of ROKs up to the top of a tower. The ROK-Lift had a plate on the front as a button to operate an elevating mechanism similar to the RC Elevator. The mechanism contained gears which rode along a piece called "Elevator Racks" with grooved edges designed for the ROK Lift and the RC Elevator. A player would use an RC vehicle to dump ROKs into a storage bin on either side of the lift module, then bump into the button to start the elevating motion; once the lift reached a cap piece, the bins automatically dumped into a receiving container or chute, and the lift returned to the bottom.

=== Night Shift Trailer ===
The Night Shift Trailer was a trailer which could be hitched on by any Rokenbok vehicle, and driven to the desired location. The trailer is related to a highway construction sign, meant to direct RC vehicles out of the way of the construction site. The sign features two LED flood-lights, and two LED direction lights, pointing right, left, or both ways. The LED lights are activated by hand. This product was often included as a free bonus for larger sets and bundles.

=== Motorized Conveyor ===
The Motorized Conveyor was a motorized device which carried ROKs up. The Motorized Conveyor was 12 inches by 4" in diameter. The Motorized Conveyor used an optical sensor to detect when ROKs are in the bottom of the lift, effectively acting as an on/off switch. There were one or two spinning wheels with grooves which agitated the ROKs and helped to prevent jamming. The original Conveyor belt came in the A/C plug version, where a command deck (used with the first generation controllers) was needed with an "accessory" port for plugging in the motorized conveyor accessory. Soon after, Rokenbok created a battery operated Motorized Conveyor to eliminate wires and save electricity. The Conveyors came in orange and brown, and red and yellow.

=== Action Sorter ===
The Action Sorter was used to direct ROKs in four directions. One sorted them by color, one led to a tipple underneath, and two merged and let to an output for custom chutes to be built.

=== Silo ===
The Silo was the top of the Pump Station Start Set, as well as the Piston Plant for those who already own a different start set. The silo used a vehicle driving back and forth to push a hanging arm which would raise and lower bins above. These bins would move ROKs from ramp to ramp in two different paths. One path would dump the ROKs to a fast chute below, while the other would slowly release ROKs at one corner.

== Construction system ==
=== Beams and blocks ===
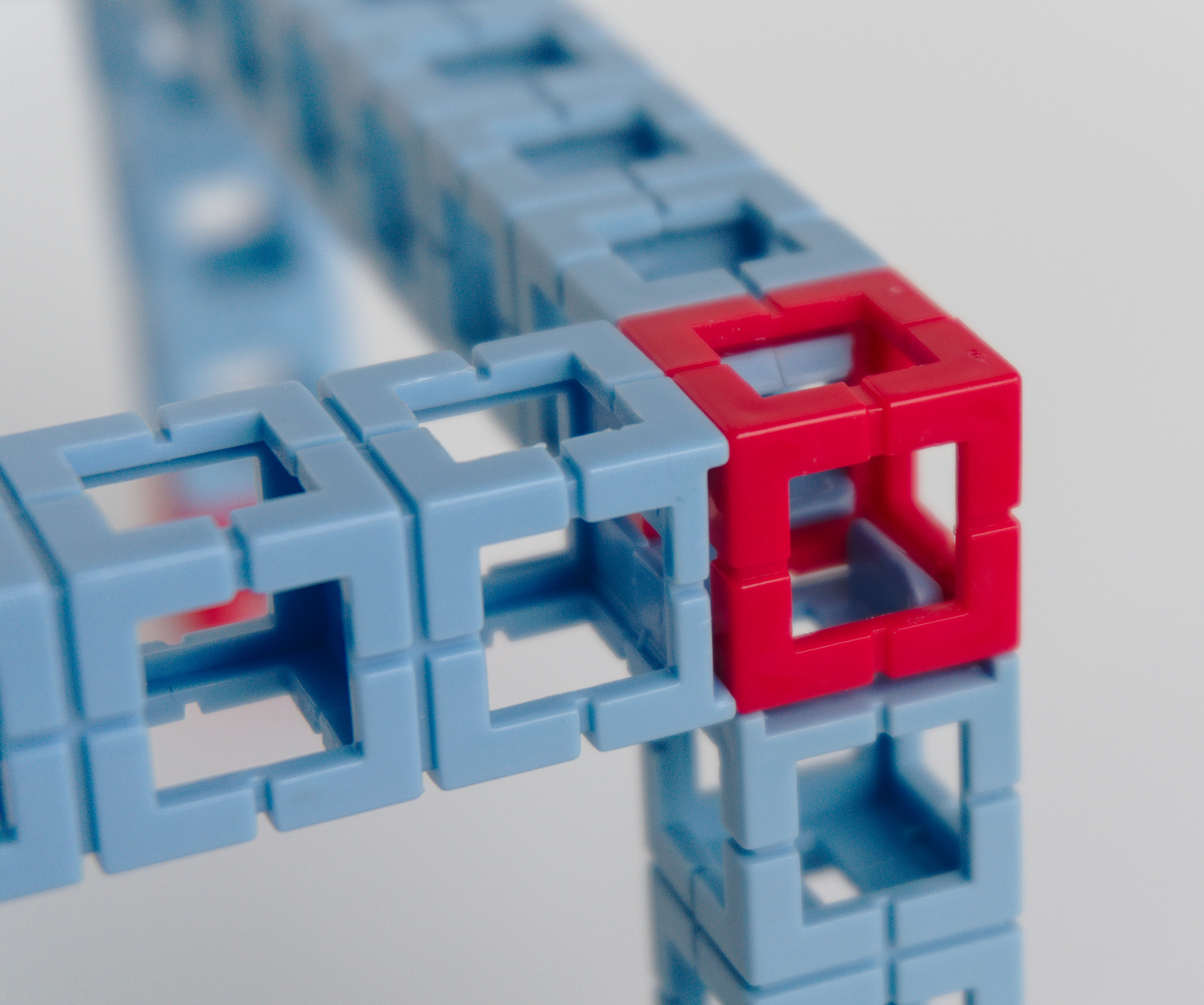
Beams connected with a block

The construction system features beams and blocks that interlock to create structures. There are two lengths of beams, one seven blocks long the other three blocks long. These have tabs on the ends that connect to the blocks. Because beams are the similar to blocks, but longer, it is possible to connect a beam at any interval down the beam. These and the ROK balls were carried over from the former Rokenbok system to Kid Spark Education.

=== ROKs and chute systems ===
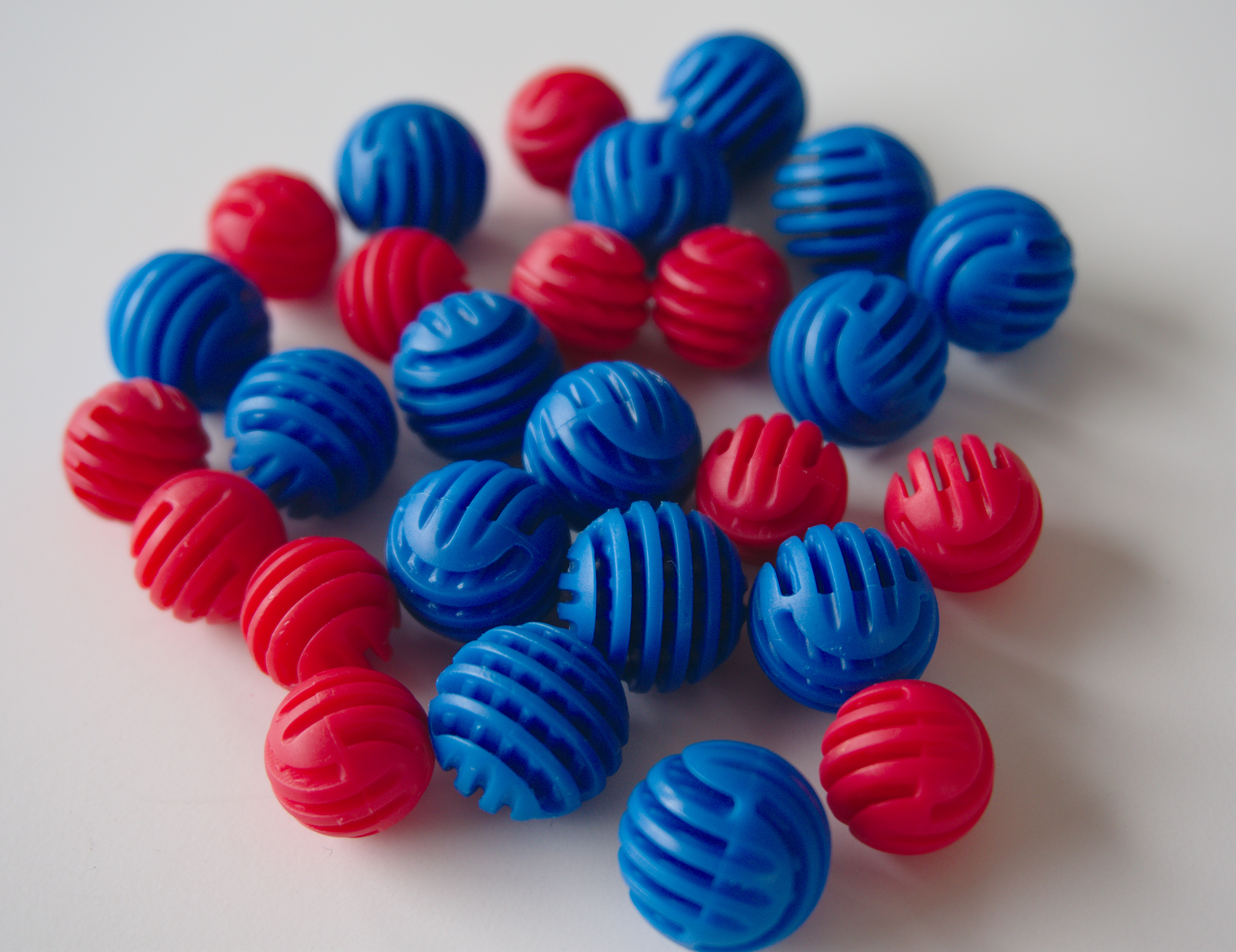
ROK Balls

Rokenbok contained a user-constructed chute system. This includes the ROK Motorized Conveyor, hoppers, sorting chutes, trap door chutes, along with many other curve pieces. Hoppers will sort the ROK balls in one of two directions depending on where the balls fall. Sorting chutes will force the red ROK balls to fall through a hole that the blue ROKs can't go through, due to their difference in size. Trap door chutes had a hinged door that you could open or close, used for ending a chute system. Kid Spark Education currently only sells ROK balls. All the related accessories have been discontinued.

== Monorail train system ==
The monorail system, introduced in 2000, uses beams and blocks just like the regular building system. There are curved and "s" beams as well to create turns or sloped (for ascending and descending) track. Rokenbok makes riser beams which are two blocks long with tabs on only one end to support the track since the monorail train itself hangs down over the sides of the track for balance and blocks the side connection holes on the beams.

== Controls ==
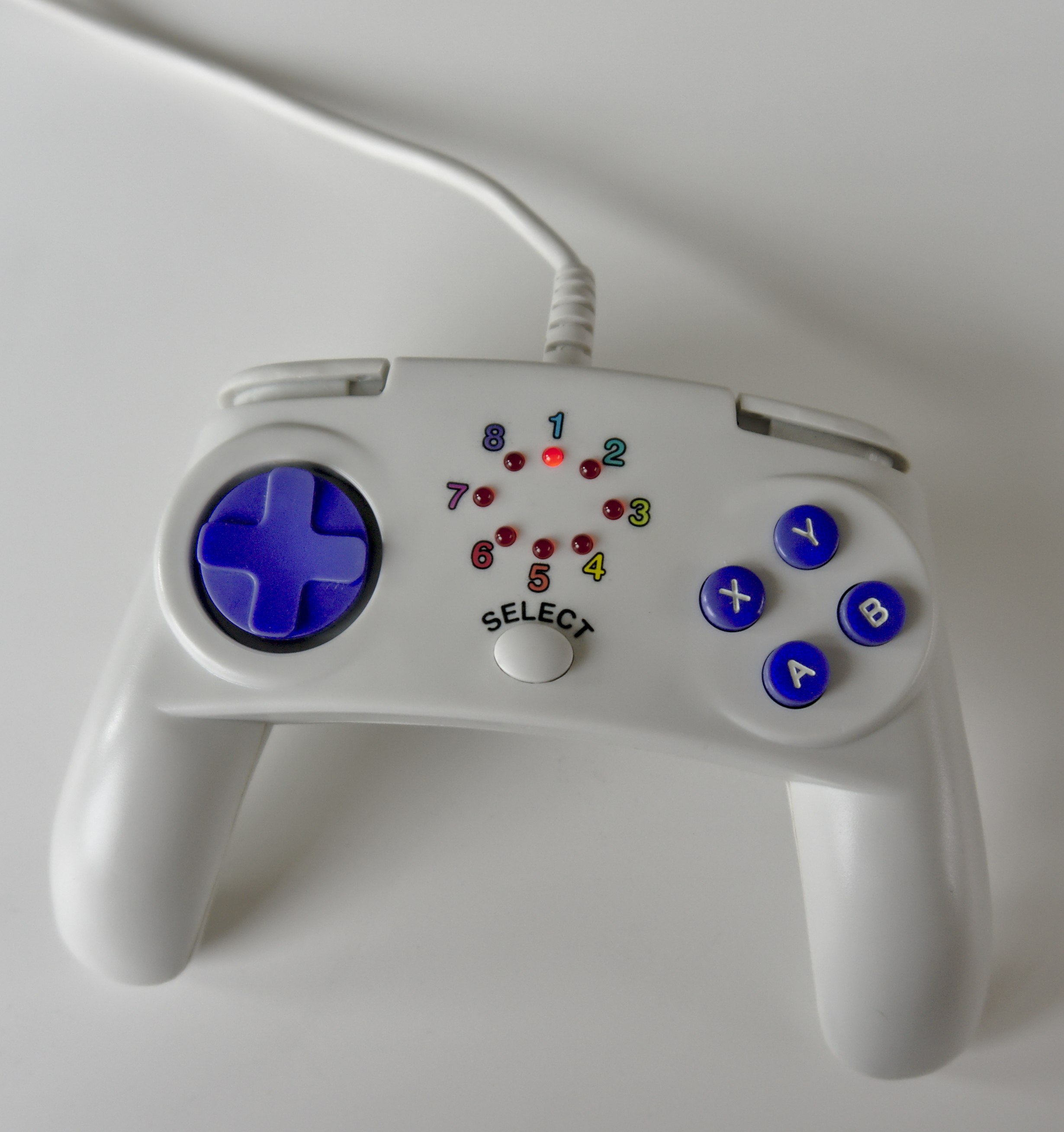
Control pad for the first-generation remote control system

The Rokenbok vehicles, crane, and elevator were controlled with controllers, not unlike the Xbox's or PlayStation's in design. The first generation controller was wired and required that the user pressed a button to cycle to the vehicle number they wished to control. The successor to this was the "Rok-Star" controller, a wireless controller that allows players to select a vehicle by pointing a red light onto the vehicle's receiver. This removed the limit on how many vehicles could be controlled by a player, and how many players could play at once. The control pads, consist of three sections, the left contains the four-way directional pad, or D-pad, that controls the movement of the vehicles. On the center of each control pad is a button which the player presses to cycle through available units and vehicles that can be controlled (up to eight on the older RC controllers, chosen by setting a LED light on a number 1-8, presented in a circular fashion, each corresponding to the numbered radio keys in each vehicle on the Classic RC base, or on the ROK star controller, there is a large "R" button the player presses and holds and then points at a ROK star vehicle to select it). On the right section, there are four function buttons: A, B, X, and Y. They have different functions for each vehicle. The ROK star controller also has buttons to sound a siren (and change its pitch) and sound back-up alarms. Above each handle, at the top of the control pad, are two shoulder buttons. The left-hand shoulder button will switch to the last vehicle the player used; the right-hand shoulder button will slow the vehicle down. The D-pad and shoulder buttons provide the same function for each vehicle.
