= Federal Administrative Court =

Federal Administrative Court may refer to:

- Federal Administrative Court (Germany)
- Federal Administrative Court (Switzerland)

== See also ==
- Administrative Appeals Tribunal of Australia
