= Trix (construction set) =

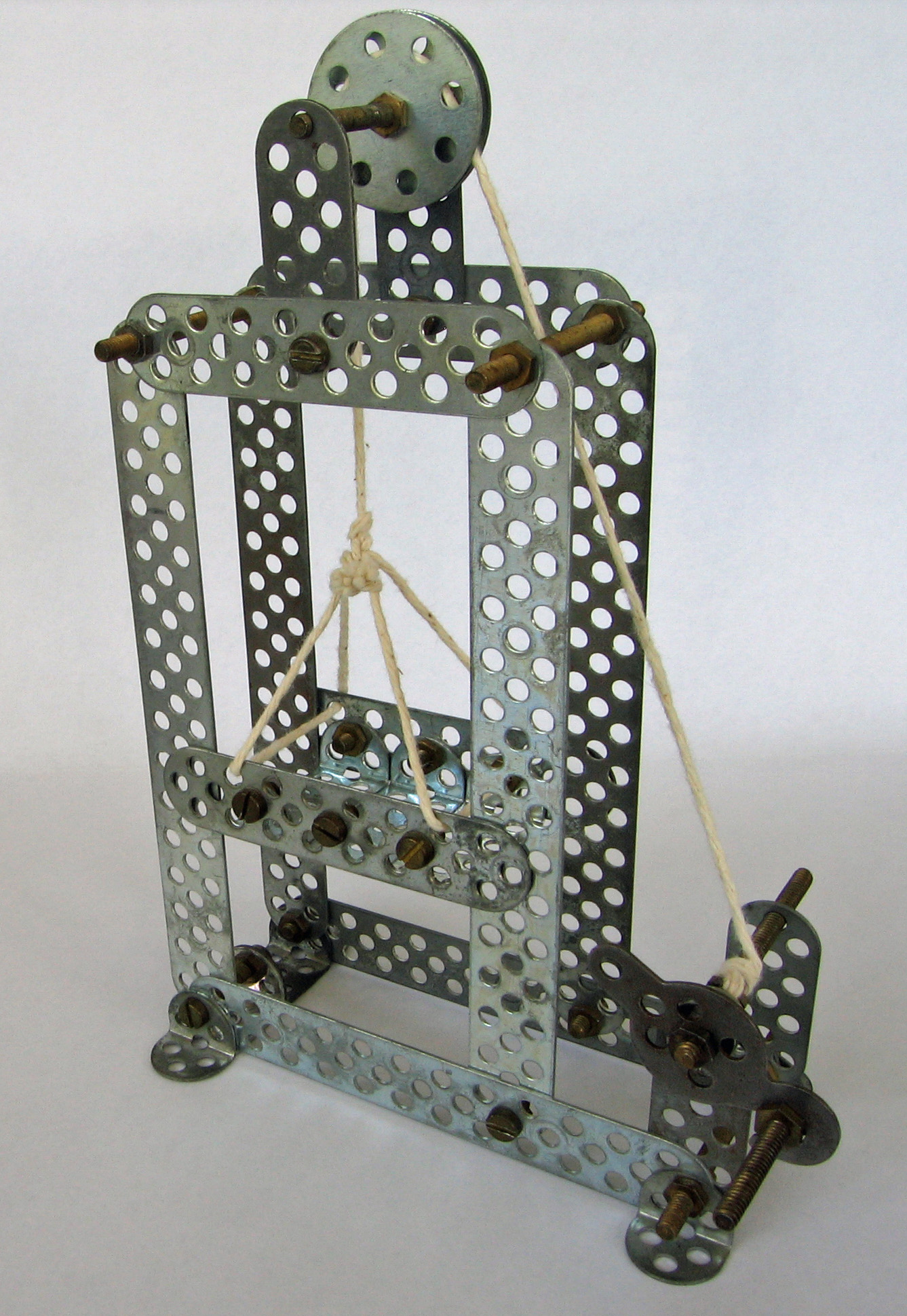
A simple elevator constructed in Trix

Trix model construction sets were originally produced in 1931 by a Nuremberg company, Andreas Förtner (Anfoe). The German patent for the basic Trix pieces had been granted the previous year, in 1930.

The origin of the name Trix is uncertain; it has been suggested (by Adrie Wind]) that it could have referred to the triple-hole configuration of the basic pieces.

A friendship between Stephan Bing, owner of Anfoe, and the English toy manufacturer W J Bassett-Lowke led to the founding of the London company Trix Ltd in 1932. In the United Kingdom, the first sets were advertised in the 1932 Gamages catalogue.

Trix sets challenged the British-invented Meccano model construction sets. Meccano Ltd responded to the challenge by producing their own similar competitor set, the Meccano "X-Series", which had the same wider strips as Trix with three rows of holes.

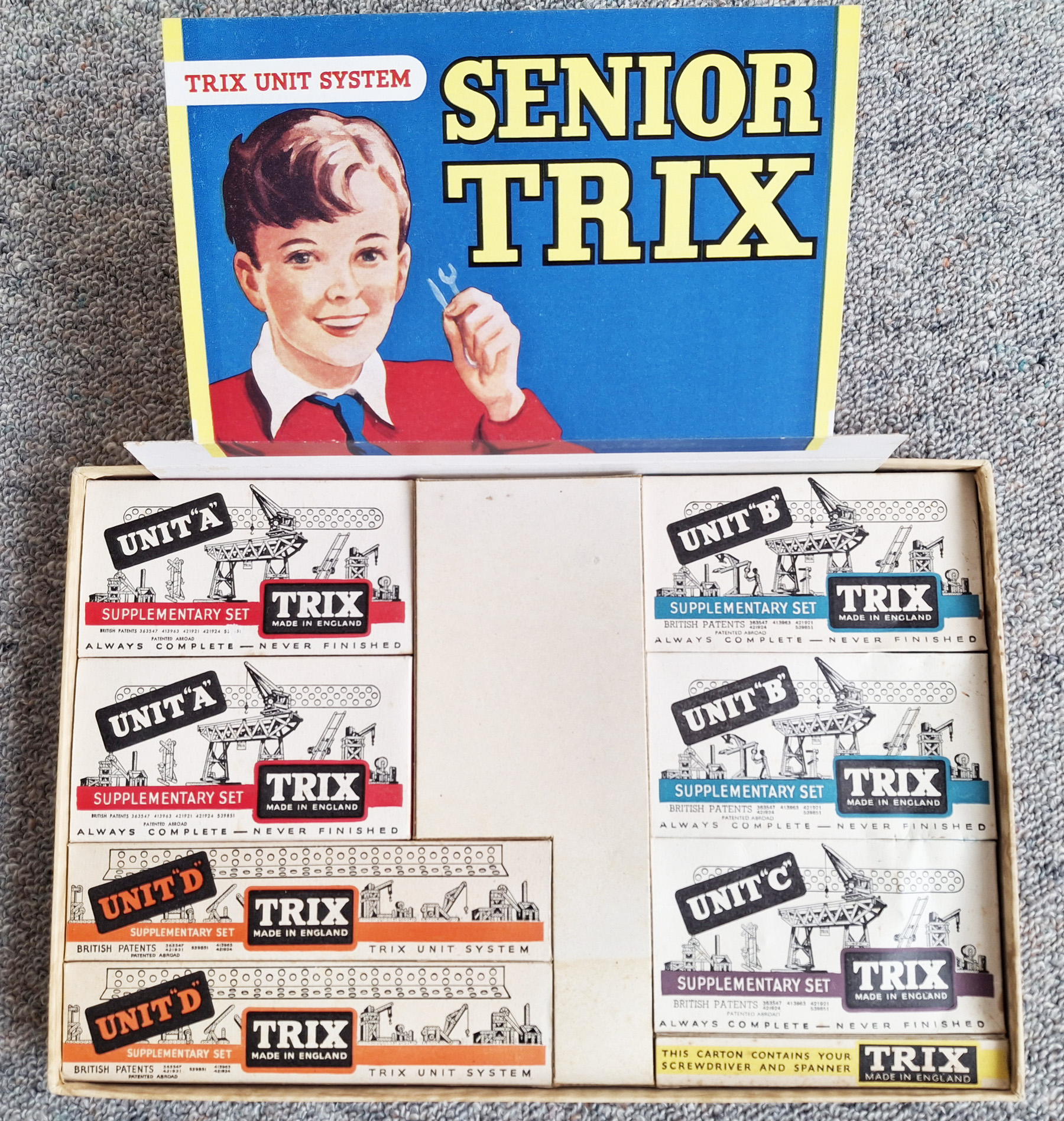
A Senior Trix construction set, showing Units A, B, C and D

A unique feature of Trix was the Trix Unit System, in which sets were built from seven different units that each contained a variety of parts. Unit A was the basic unit, which allowed the construction of simple models. Unit B added components that enabled "more ambitious models to be attempted". Unit C added a range of wheels and pulleys. Unit D contained angle girders. Unit E introduced electrical parts that allowed the construction of buzzers, bells, telegraphs and other electric apparatus. Unit F contained two sizes of tyres. while Unit G added gear wheels of different types. Hence. the Trix slogan, widely featured in advertising, was "Always complete - yet never finished".
