= Fine Arts Center =

The Fine Arts Center, or The FAC, may refer to:

- Fine Arts Center (Massachusetts), at the University of Massachusetts Amherst
- Fine Arts Center (South Carolina), in Greenville
