= Discovery Toys =

Multi-level marketing company specializing in educational toys

- Industry: Multi-level marketing
- Founded: 1978; 48 years ago
- Founder: Lane Nemeth
- Headquarters: Livermore, California, U.S.
- Key people: Jerry Salerno (CEO)
- Products: Toys
- Website: www.discoverytoys.net

Discovery Toys is a multi-level marketing company specializing in educational toys. Its products are sold in the U.S. and Canada, and its headquarters are in Livermore, California.

The company was purchased by Avon Products in 1997 and became a wholly owned subsidiary of Eos International in 2001.

== History ==
Discovery Toys was founded as a multi-level marketing company in 1978 by Lane Nemeth, a former daycare director, with a $5,000 family loan. Lane, a mother from the San Francisco bay area, started the company when she was unable to find educational toys for her own children.

According to Nemeth, the company had 2,500 sales "consultants" in 1982 and had reached $4.6 million in revenue the previous year. Ms. Nemeth grew the company to a $100 million in annual revenue by 1997 then sold the company to Avon who sold it in 2002 to a private equity group. Discovery Toys was acquired by and became a wholly owned subsidiary of Eos International, Inc. in July 2001.

One of the company's top selling toys is Marbleworks. Released in 1982, it consists of colorful, sloped, plastic half-pipes of different designs. The individual pieces interlock, creating a track on which marbles are run. Marbleworks was included in Discovery's product line when Discovery Toys expanded into China in 2003.
