= Federation Autonome du Collegial =

The Federation Autonome du Collegial (FAC) is a teachers union in the Canadian province of Quebec, representing teachers at a number of the province's CEGEPs.

== History ==
The FAC represented three thousand teachers at fourteen CEGEPs during a bargaining process with the provincial government in 1989–90. After protracted negotiations, the FAC accepted a separate contract from that of two other provincial unions representing CEGEP teachers, the Fédération nationale des enseignantes et enseignants du Québec and the Central de l'Enseignement du Quebec. During the late 1990s, the FAC had grown to represent teachers at seventeen Quebec CEGEPs. A representative of the union wrote a piece against proposed CEGEP mergers in 1997, arguing that it would result in fewer programs and reduced access to education for students.

In 2006, the FAC joined with other Quebec unions to create a brochure for students entitled, "Let's Talk Politics," drawing attention to education issues. In April 2009, the FAC expressed its support for Syndicat des professeurs et professeures de l'Université members who were involved in labour action at the Université du Québec à Montréal.
