= Tente (toy) =

Construction toy

Tente brand logo

2x4 Tente brick. Note the central hole in each stud allowing secondary connection method.

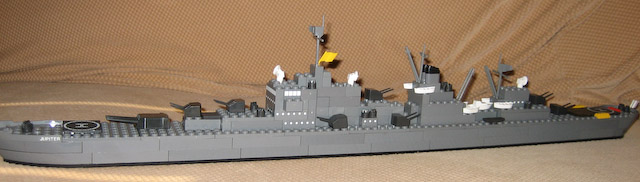
Example of Tente Mar/Oceanis warship.

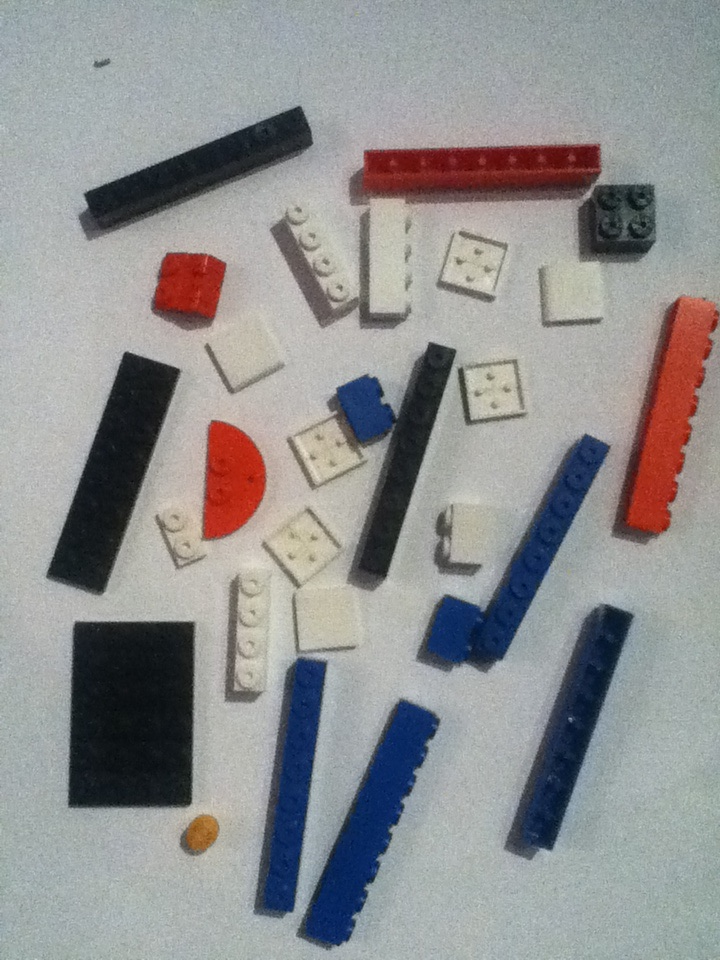
Various TENTE elements.

Tente is a line of construction toys created in 1972 by EXIN-LINES BROS S.A., a plastics and toy company based in Barcelona, Spain, which ceased operation in 1993. The toys consist of multi-colored interlocking plastic bricks in multiple scales and an accompanying array of wheels, minifigures, and various accessories.

Subsequently, the trademark and patents were acquired by EDUCA BORRAS, and the toy line was discontinued. Their later series were no longer compatible with the old system, although some models remained compatible. In October 2021, the toy line was relaunched by a group of enthusiasts with a different company, iUnits, which commercializes compatible versions of classic pieces in old and new colors, as well as new designs, including some pieces compatible with both Tente and Lego anchoring systems.

Unlike the more popular Lego line of interlocking brick toys, which is a primary competitor, the Tente line emphasizes commercial and military vehicles of a variety of scales, less confined to the "minifig" scale that dominates Lego building sets. The primary physical difference with Lego bricks is that Tente brick's studs have a small central hole that allow an alternative connection method to accessory pieces. Additionally, although modeled on Lego, with nearly identical brick and plate outer dimensions (including the fact that three stacked plates is equivalent in height to one brick), the studs of Tente pieces have a larger diameter than Lego pieces, resulting in them being incompatible.

Hasbro marketed the toys in the United States and Japan. Some of these models are different from those offered in Europe because Exin authorized the creation of new models adapted to the tastes of the alternative markets. In the United States, Tente sets were typically found in specialty toy and model/hobby shops and not major toy retail stores. There is a small but significant aftermarket for Tente toys on auction sites such as eBay.

== EXIN Series ==
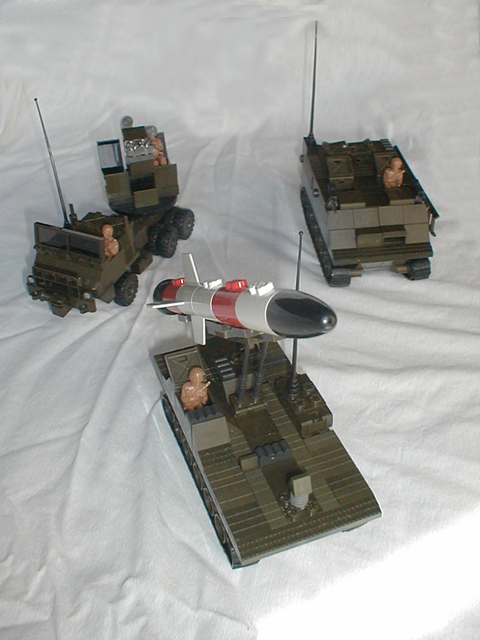
EXIN Scorpion series set Scorpiones de Acero.

Aire, Helicopters
Alfa, Futuristic buildings and surface vehicles
Astro, Spaceships
Castillos, Marmored colour bricks for building castles
Combi/MultiModel, Small scale small ocean ships and space surface vehicles, intended for sets to be combined to create larger vehicles
Compact, Vehicles/Spaceships at larger scale than primary sets
Cosmic, Surface-based space vehicles
Elephant, Very large scale models similar to Lego Duplo
Iniciacion, Sets of simple pieces in primary colors for smaller children
Mar/Oceanis, Small scale ocean-going ships
Micro, Small scale city buildings
Mini, Smaller scale city buildings
Mutants, Animal themed spaceships
Pocket, Small vehicles
Roblock, Colorful robots that turn into vehicles
Ruta, Working trucks
Scorpion, Army trucks, tanks and other vehicles
Titanium, Exploration vehicles
Variant, Large scale vehicles for children

== BORRAS Series ==
Multimedia, Road vehicle models which include computer games and a 3D modeling program (not compatible with EXIN series)
Unnamed series, Small scale large ocean liners, warships and sailing ships (compatible with EXIN series)

== See also ==
- EXÍN Castles
