= List of Lego computer-aided design programs =

Software allowing for digital building of Lego

This is a list of computer-aided design software allowing for the virtual creation of Lego models. Examples include Lego Digital Designer, BrickLink Studio, and the LDraw system. Although a few are owned by The Lego Group, others have been developed by fans. Some also allow for creating instructions and rendering models.

== Official software ==
=== BrickLink Studio ===
A software created by BrickLink allowing people to design, render, and create instructions for Lego models. It was first released in 2016. An updated version, Stud.io 2.0, was released in 2018. A companion software, PartDesigner, allows for the creation of custom parts which can then be used in Studio.

=== Lego Digital Designer ===
An official software for modeling Lego designs developed by Qube Software and released in 2003. It was at one point connected to the website Lego Design byME, where people could order designs they had built. The software received regular updates until 2016. It was officially discontinued in 2022, with BrickLink Studio becoming its replacement.

== LDraw programs ==
LDraw is a system of freeware tools and a 3D graphics file format standard for modeling Lego creations. Many softwares have been created using the LDraw parts library.

=== BrickSmith ===
A software for Mac operating systems developed by Allen Smith and released in 2005. Aside from designing builds, the software also provides the ability to create instructions.

=== LDCad ===
A software developed by Roland Melkert for the editing of LDraw files.

=== LeoCAD ===
An open-source software for Lego design created by Leonardo Zide and released in 1997.

=== MLCad ===
A software for designing models, also known as Mike's Lego CAD, developed by Michael Lachmann and released in 1999. It also provides the option to create instructions.

== Online programs ==
=== Mecabricks ===
An online building program started by Nicolas Jarraud in 2012. The website also offers animation and rendering features. An add-on allows users to export models to Blender.

=== Build with Chrome ===
A Google Chrome Experiment released worldwide in 2014 in collaboration with The Lego Group. Builders could share their creations to a gallery. It was retired in 2017.

== Other ==
- BlockCAD: An editor started in 1998 featuring Lego-like bricks. A spin-off software for regular building blocks, AnkerCAD, was also created.
