= LeoCAD =

CAD program for visualising Lego models

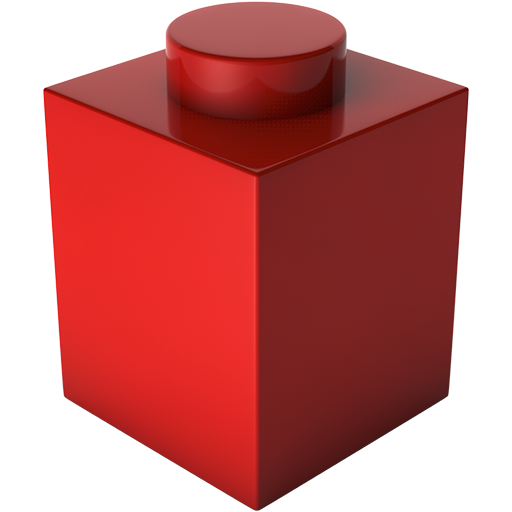

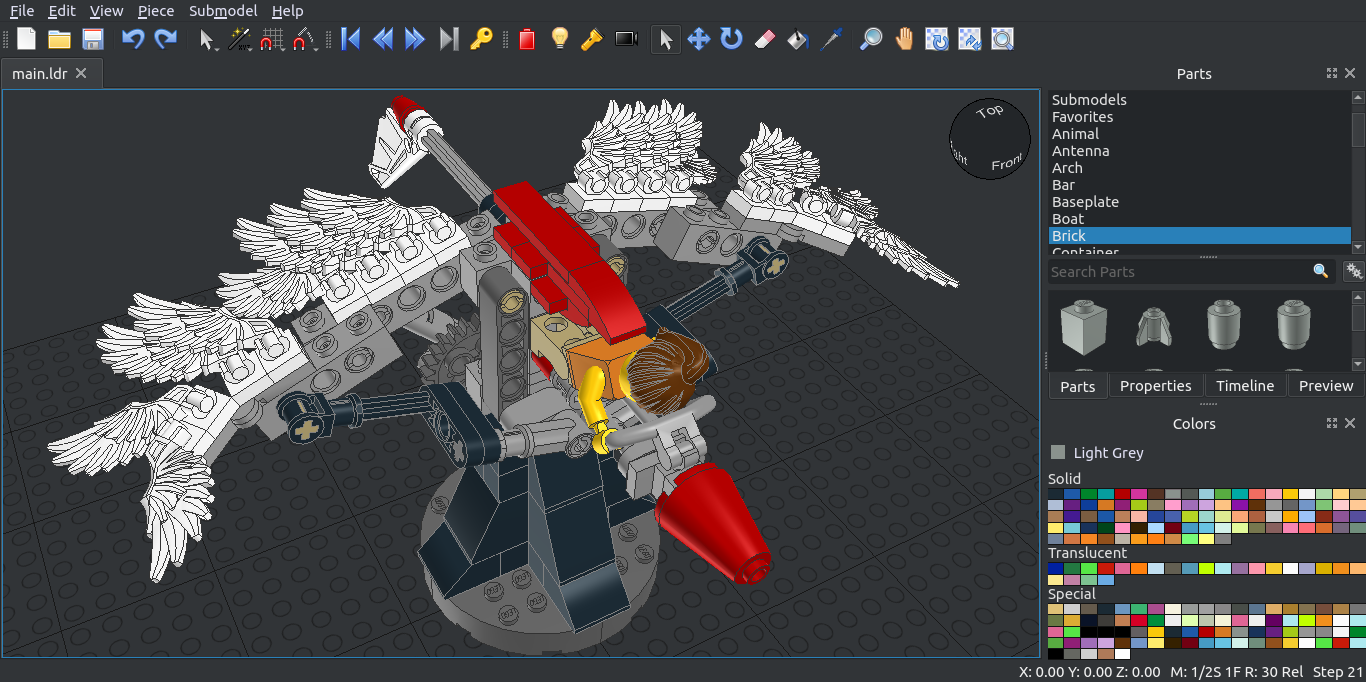
- Screenshot Screenshot of Flyer build from LEGO Masters Denmark rebuilt in LeoCAD
- Original author: Leonardo Zide
- Release: 1997; 29 years ago
- Stable release: 26.09 / September 19, 2026; 59 days ago
- Written in: C++
- Operating system: Windows; MacOS; Linux
- Size: 151-196 MB
- Available in: English
- Type: Computer-aided design
- License: GPLv2
- Website: www.leocad.org
- Repository: github.com/leozide/leocad

LeoCAD is a free and open-source 3D CAD program for creating virtual Lego models by using parts from LDraw library. It was developed by Leonardo Zide in 1997.

== History ==
LeoCAD is developed and released by Leonardo Zide around 1997 under GPLv2 free and open source software license. It is written in C++ and uses Qt as GUI. At first it was a standalone CAD software with its own brick library, but soon it was updated to adopt the LDraw library and file format, an unofficial Lego parts collection that was very popular at the time. As of 2024, LDraw contains over 10.000 pieces and still gets updated with new bricks.

In 2021, Leonardo received James Jessiman Memorial Award from LDraw community for his creation of LeoCAD and contributions to the parts library.

== Features ==
LeoCAD allows users to build Lego models in a CAD environment with LDraw bricks library which is installed by default to make it easier for users to start building. Apart from LDraw, it is possible to import other custom brick libraries. LeoCAD also enables users to track each part which can be used to generate step-by-step instruction just like in official Lego sets.

Parts can be selected from the part selector and directly dragged into the building area where they can be moved or rotated via arrows with customizable precision. Building area provides 6 virtual cameras built-in which can be used to focus on different parts of the build. Other tools include additional cameras for alternative view angles, omni lights and spotlight.

By default, LeoCAD saves builds as LDraw-compatible LDR and MPD (Multi-Part Document) file format. It supports exporting builds as Wavefront OBJ, COLLADA DAE and Autodesk 3DS models and curating brick lists in CSV, HTML and BrickLink-compatible XML. It also has a built-in POV-Ray render option.

== Gallery ==
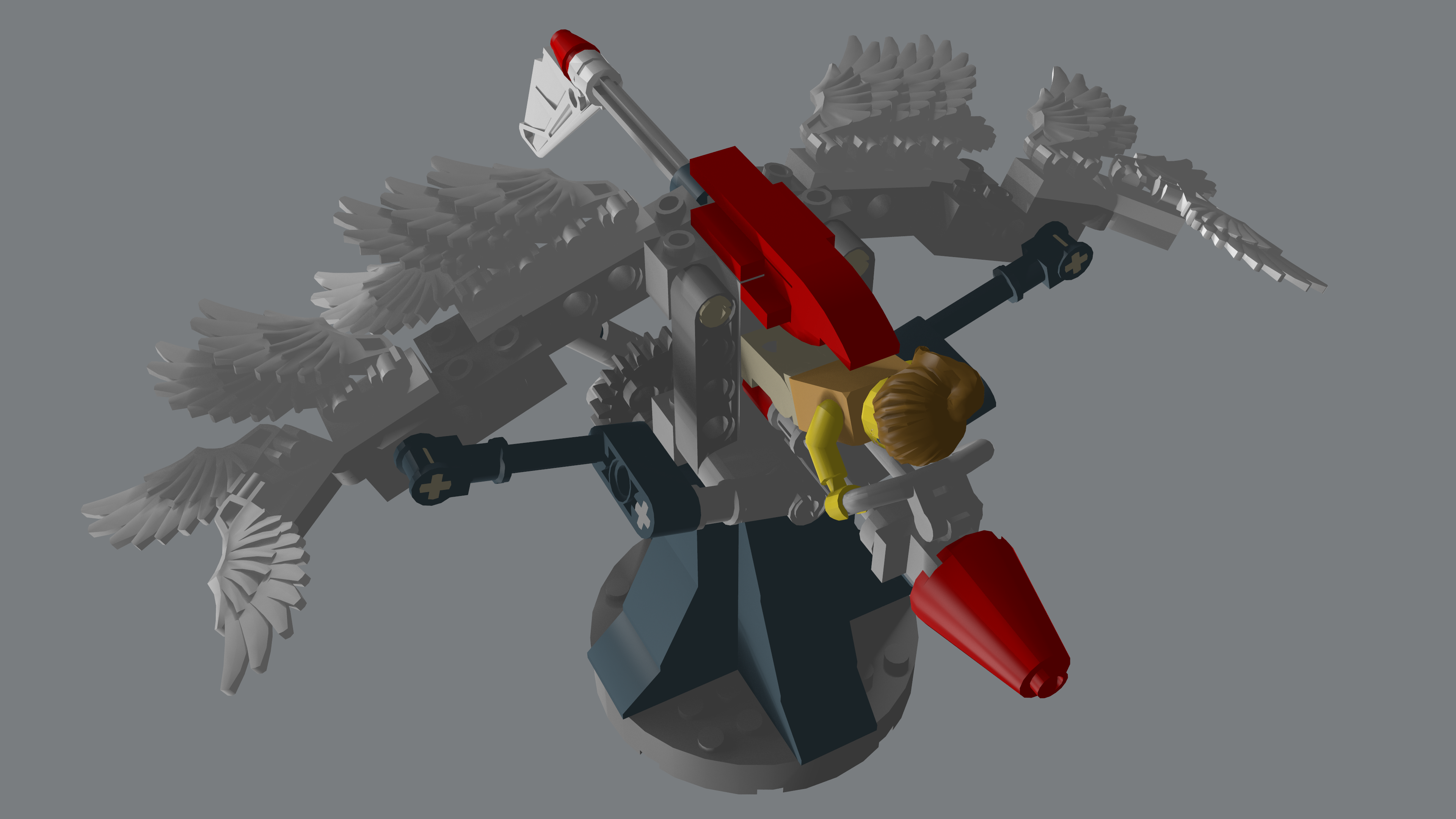
POV-Ray rendering of the flyer model generated inside LeoCAD

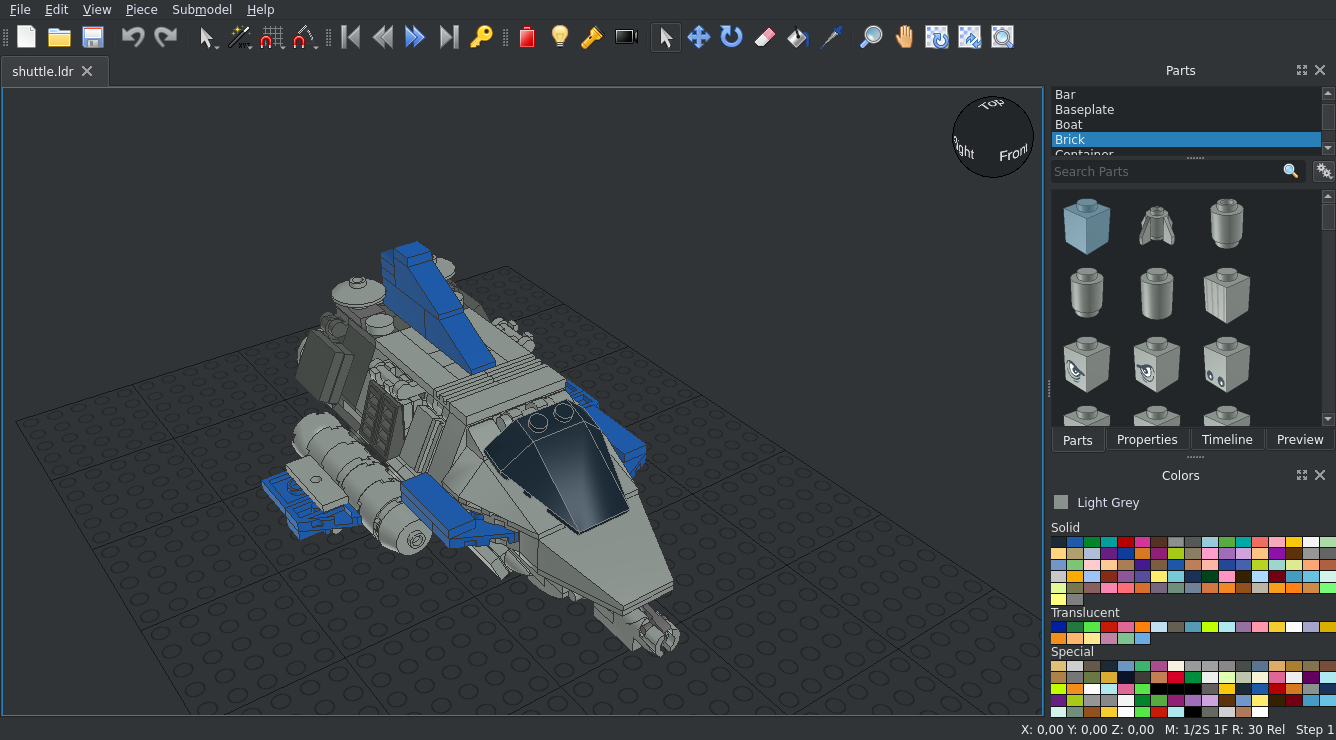
Shuttle model inspired from Endless Sky

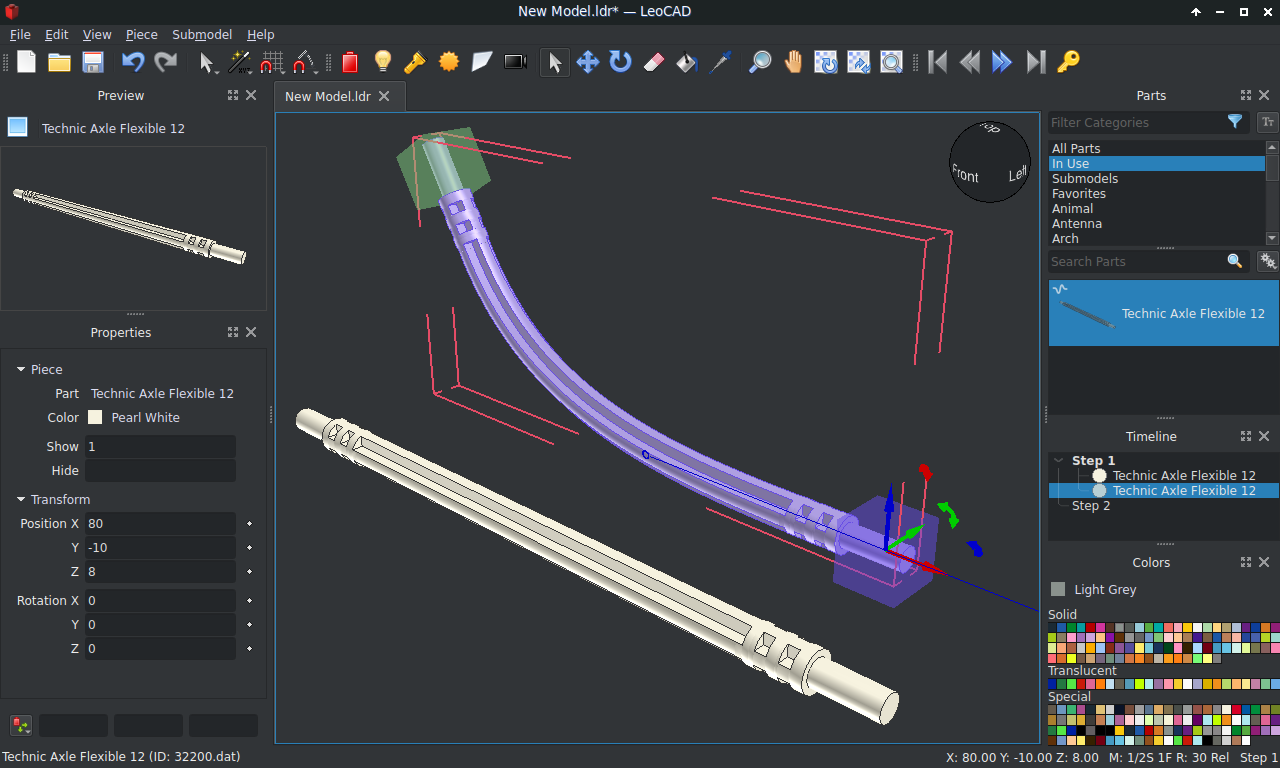
Flex part

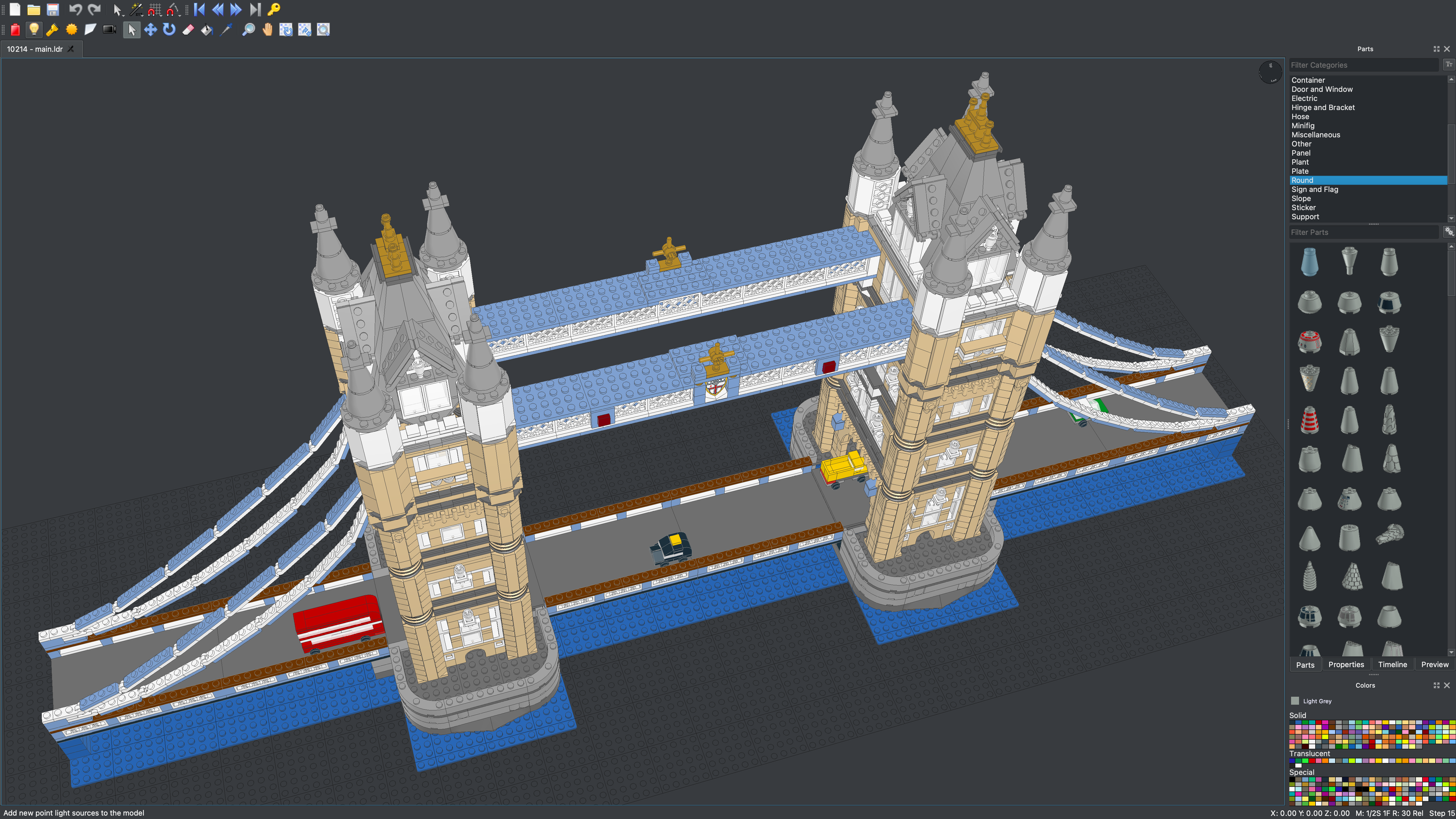
LeoCAD design of the Tower Bridge

== Usage ==
LeoCAD and LDraw parts are mentioned in academic research and used in projects. In 2008, a group of academics from Technical University of Lisbon wrote a paper that reviews available LEGO CAD tools of the time including LeoCAD and made suggestions on how to improve virtual brick building experience. They created their own software with gravity and collisions, and compared it with LeoCAD in terms of efficiency. In 2019, LeoCAD was used for designing virtual 3d model of a Lego Mindstorms based robot for autonomous vehicle simulation research which got revealed in an IEEE conference of that year.

== See also ==
- BrickLink Studio
- Lego Digital Designer
- List of 3D modeling software

== Bibliography ==
- T. Santos, A. Ferreira, F. Dias & M. J. Fonseca. Using Sketches and Retrieval to Create LEGO Models. Eurographics Workshop on Sketch-Based Interfaces and Modeling, 2008.
- Daniel Mendes, Alfredo Ferreira. Virtual LEGO Modelling on Multi-Touch Surfaces. WSCG'2011 Full Papers Proceedings, 2011. ISBN 978-80-86943-83-1
- Van Thanh Tran, Dongho Kim. An Application of Virtual Reality in E-learning based LEGO-Like Brick Assembling. School of Global Media, Soongsil University, Seoul, Korea, 2016.
