= Mecabricks =

- Logo

- Screenshot Website interface
- Website type: Computer-aided design

Mecabricks is a browser-based computer-aided design program that allows for the virtual design of Lego creations.

== See also ==
- BrickLink Studio
- LDraw
