= Lego Jurassic World (theme) =

Lego theme

- Subject: Jurassic World
- Licensed from: Universal Animation Studios and Amblin Entertainment
- Availability: June 2015–present
- Total sets: 95
- Characters: Owen Grady, Zia Rodriguez, Maisie Lockwood, Dr. Wu, Alan Grant, Ellie Sattler, Ian Malcolm
- Official website

Lego Jurassic World (stylized as LEGO Jurassic World) is a Lego theme based on the Jurassic World media franchise created by Michael Crichton and centered on a disastrous attempt to create a theme park of cloned dinosaurs. It is licensed from Universal Filmed Entertainment Group and Amblin Entertainment. The theme was introduced in June 2015, with the release of toy sets and the video game Lego Jurassic World, both to promote the film Jurassic World. Subsequent sets were released in 2018, alongside the next film, Jurassic World: Fallen Kingdom. Various animated projects have also been made, including the 2018 television special Lego Jurassic World: The Secret Exhibit, and the 2019 miniseries Lego Jurassic World: Legend of Isla Nublar.

== Overview ==
Lego Jurassic World is based on the Jurassic World media franchise. The first film, Jurassic World, focuses on a fully functioning dinosaur theme park. It was released in June 2015. As part of the marketing campaign, The Lego Group released toy sets based on the film. Each set featured different dinosaurs, such as Velociraptor, Tyrannosaurus rex, Dilophosaurus and the Indominus rex. Human figures were released as well, including one depicting Chris Pratt's character, Owen Grady. It was Pratt's third Lego minifigure, following toys based on The Lego Movie and Guardians of the Galaxy. A 90-second fan video was released shortly after the film, recreating it in Lego form. A separate three-minute fan video based on the first Jurassic Park film was also created by a father and his daughter in 2015.

The sequel film, Jurassic World: Fallen Kingdom, was released in June 2018. Lego produced various toy sets based on the film ahead of its release. The largest set, with 1,019 Lego bricks, depicted the film's Indoraptor and Lockwood Estate. It also included two velociraptors and six minifigures. The Lego Group also released Duplo sets for younger children. In addition, The Lego Group built a life-sized model of Blue, a Velociraptor who appears in the Jurassic World films. The model included Blue standing on an overturned tour vehicle, representing a scene from Fallen Kingdom. The dinosaur and vehicle contained a total of 703,855 Lego bricks, and weighed 3,560 pounds. They were placed in front of Stage 18 at Universal Studios Hollywood. To commemorate the 25th anniversary of the first Jurassic Park film, Lego also introduced the Jurassic Park Velociraptor Chase set. It came with 360 Lego bricks, and included a Velociraptor and the computer control room seen in the film. It also included four minifigures of characters from the film.

Four toy sets, based on the Lego Jurassic World: Legend of Isla Nublar miniseries, were released in 2019. Lego also introduced the Jurassic Park: T. rex Rampage set, based on the original Jurassic Park film. The set came with 3,120 Lego bricks, and included a posable T. rex, six minifigures, and the Jurassic Park gate seen in the film. It was designed by Lego Senior Model Designer Mark Stafford. Four new sets were released in 2020.

In May 2022, Chris Pratt had unveiled a life-size replica of the T. rex head who appears in Jurassic World: Dominion film. The T. rex head contained 200,000 of Lego pieces and placed in front of the Rockefeller Center in New York.

== Development ==
Lego Jurassic World was inspired by Jurassic World media franchise. The Lego construction toy range is based on the film series and developed in collaboration with Universal Brand Development. The construction sets were designed to recreate the story and characters of the film series in Lego form.

Before the launch of the Lego Jurassic World range, The Lego Dino Attack theme was released in 2005. This theme focused on radioactive dinosaurs that were created by mad scientists and featured dinosaurs and armoured all-terrain vehicles. Lego Dino Attack theme was known as Lego Dino 2010 in Europe. In 2012, Lego Dino Attack was replaced by Lego Dino. These themes eventually resulted in the introduction of the Lego Jurassic World theme, which included some of the original concepts of the Lego Dino Attack and Lego Dino themes, such as the dinosaurs, buildings and armoured all-terrain vehicles, but also introduced modern day elements.

During the development process, the Jurassic World: Fallen Kingdom inspired theme involved a dedicated group of Lego designers collaborating with the artists behind the movie to bring Jurassic World: Fallen Kingdom to life in Lego form. Model Designer Luis Castaneda explained, "They pitch us what they can without spoiling the movie, they give us the highlights of the movie and then we do our toy version, our interpretation of those scenes. For us it's all about making a fun toy. Jurassic World is pretty straightforward. We know there is going to be dinos, we know there is going to be cool vehicles, good heroes and some other humans that are probably not heroes. There's going to be something going on, the dinosaurs are going to escape from cages and what not, so there's going to be a lot of catching and chasing dynamics in the movie."

The range of Lego Jurassic World sets introduced new dinosaurs, eggs and baby dinosaurs. Luis Castaneda explained, "The reasons that the dinosaurs were chosen were for their 'iconicness', the ones that were clearly different, and a couple of novelties – dinos that we hadn't seen before. We really loved the fact there was a flying dino, there was a dino that is not a flesh eater but is quite dangerous because he butts with his head, and the Raptors. I mean the Raptors are almost like the main stars in the franchise and we know this one, Blue, from the previous movie. At the end of that movie she turns out to be some sort of a hero because she ends up saving everybody. We like Blue a lot. Then we have the Carnotaurus, which I don't think we've seen in the previous movies. So that's one of the novelties."

In 2019, Lego Jurassic World: Legend of Isla Nublar sets had revealed the new concepts and was in development. Lego Designer Manager Marcos Bessa explained, "For the LEGO Jurassic World franchise in 2019 we have four novelty products coming out. These products are primarily based on new content we are doing with Universal. It expands the universe and takes place between the original trilogy and the first Jurassic World movie. The new park is already functioning, and Owen has just arrived at the park. We’ve seen in Jurassic World that he already has a history with Claire but what we are going to see in our TV series is how they actually build and develop that relationship."

Lego Jurassic World: Legend of Isla Nublar provided inspiration for this year's new sets, which the Lego design team collaborating with the minds behind the new series. Marcos Bessa explained, “This actually taps into a particular moment in the show, there's also a whole storyline about a treasure hunt across the island. Two of the sets tie into that storyline directly, whilst two tie into the theme park.”

== Characters ==
=== Lego Jurassic World ===
- Owen Grady: A Navy veteran and ethologist, and former Velociraptor handler for Jurassic World.
- Claire Dearing: Jurassic World's former operations manager, now a dinosaur-rights activist, who has founded the Dinosaur Protection Group to save Isla Nublar's surviving dinosaurs. Aunt to Zach and Gray Mitchell.
- Vic Hoskins: The head of InGen's security operations, who wants to use the Velociraptors and the Indominus rex as military animals.
- Gray Mitchell: One of Claire's nephews and the younger brother of Zach.
- Zach Mitchell: One of Claire's nephews and the older brother of Gray.
- Eli Mills: Lockwood's ambitious assistant who recruits Owen and Claire to rescue the dinosaurs.
- Franklin Webb: A former IT technician for Jurassic World who is now the Dinosaur Protection Group's systems analyst and hacker.
- Dr. Zia Rodriguez: A former Marine who is now the Dinosaur Protection Group's paleoveterinarian.
- Gunnar Eversol: An auctioneer host at Lockwood Estate who sells the Isla Nublar dinosaurs for profit.
- Ken Wheatley: A seasoned mercenary who commands the rescue operation on Isla Nublar.
- Dr. Henry Wu: The former head geneticist of both Jurassic World and the original Jurassic Park.
- Simon Masrani: CEO of the Masrani Corporation and the owner of Jurassic World.
- Maisie Lockwood: Lockwood's young granddaughter and legal ward following her parents' deaths.
- Red the Dog: Owen Grady's dog, a character unique to the toy line who does not appear to exist in the films.
- Kayla Watts: A former Air Force pilot who aids Owen and Claire on their mission.
- Rainn Delacourt: A poacher who kidnaps Maisie and Beta for BioSyn.
- Soyona Santos: A dinosaur smuggler.

=== Lego Jurassic Park ===
- Dr. Alan Grant: A paleontologist.
- Ellie Sattler: A graduate student studying under Grant, and accompanies him on the tour of InGen's dinosaur preserve.
- Lex Murphy: Tim Murphy's sister and John Hammond's granddaughter.
- Tim Murphy: Lex Murphy's brother and John Hammond's grandson.
- Ian Malcolm: A mathematician who specializes in chaos theory.
- Dr. John Hammond: The wealthy owner of Jurassic Park and founder of InGen.
- Ray Arnold: Jurassic Park's chief engineer, running the main control center from the Visitor Center.
- Dennis Nedry: An obese and messy computer scientist.

=== Lego Jurassic World Camp Cretaceous ===
- Darius Bowman: A camper who is a dinosaur fanatic from Oakland and leader of the group.
- Yasmina "Yaz" Fadoula: The "most athletically assured" of the camp goers.
- Ben Pincus: A sensitive and shy camper who takes care of an Ankylosaurus he names Bumpy.
- Brooklynn: A famous travel vlogger and camper at Camp Cretaceous.
- Kenji Kon: A self-appointed VIP camper described as the "self-proclaimed alpha male of the group".
- Sammy Gutierrez: a camper filled with enthusiasm for the experience of being at Camp Cretaceous.

== Toy line ==
=== Construction sets ===
According to BrickLink, The Lego Group released 95 playsets and promotional polybags as part of the Lego Jurassic World theme.

The Lego Jurassic World theme was launched at the New York Toy Fair in June 2015. As part of the marketing campaign, The Lego Group released six toy sets based on the first film. Each set featured different dinosaurs, pieces of the dinosaur theme park and vehicles. Minifigures were released as well, including Owen Grady, Claire Dearling, Dr. Wu, Simon Masrani and Vic Hoskins. The Lego sets released included Pteranodon Capture, Dilophosaurus Ambush, Raptor Rampage, T. rex Tracker, Indominus rex Breakout and Raptor Escape. In addition, a Gallimimus Trap polybag set was released as a promotion. The Lego Jurassic World video game was released on 12 June 2015 and included a Dr. Wu minifigure as a free gift.

In October 2017, The Lego Group confirmed that Lego Jurassic World: Fallen Kingdom products would be launched in 2018. The seven toy sets based on the Jurassic World: Fallen Kingdom film were launched in April 2018. The seven sets were Pteranodon Chase, Stygimoloch Breakout, Blue's Helicopter Pursuit, Carnotaurus Gyrosphere Escape, Indoraptor Rampage at Lockwood Estate, Dilophosaurus Outpost Attack and T. rex Transport. It's also introduced Jurassic Park Velociraptor Chase set based on the first Jurassic Park film. In addition, Baby Velociraptor Playpen polybag set was released as a promotion.

In October 2018, Universal announced that new Lego Jurassic World products would be released in 2019. The four toy sets based on the Lego Jurassic World: Legend of Isla Nublar miniseries were launched in June 2019. The four toy sets were Dilophosaurus on the Loose, Baryonyx Face-Off: The Treasure Hunt, Triceratops Rampage and T. rex vs Dino-Mech Battle. It also introduced the Jurassic Park: T. rex Rampage set based on the original Jurassic Park film. The Lego Group announced the Jurassic Park: T. rex Rampage set was retired on 31 December 2021. Another four toy sets also based on the Lego Jurassic World: Legend of Isla Nublar miniseries were released in 2020. The four toy sets were Dr. Wu's Lab: Baby Dinosaurs Breakout, Gallimimus and Pteranodon Breakout, Indominus rex vs. Ankylosaurus and Velociraptor: Biplane Rescue Mission. The Lego Group announced the four toy sets would be retired on 31 December 2021.

In 2021, four toy sets based on the Jurassic World Camp Cretaceous animated Netflix series would be released in September 2021. The four sets released included Stygimoloch Dinosaur Escape, T. rex Dinosaur Fossil Exhibition, Carnotaurus Dinosaur Chase and Baryonyx Dinosaur Boat Escape. Each of the sets included Lego minifigures of Kenji, Sammy, Ben, Brooklynn, Darius and Yaz. The Lego Group announced the four toy sets were retired on 31 December 2022.

Three sets based on the Jurassic World Dominion film and one set based on the original Jurassic Park film were released in April 2022. The three sets released included Triceratops Pick-up Truck Ambush, Pyroraptor & Dilophosaurus Transport and T-rex Breakout. T-rex Breakout set consists of 1212 pieces with 4 minifigures. T-rex Breakout set included Lego minifigures of Alan Grant, Ian Malcolm, Tim Murphy and Lex Murphy. An addition, The Lego Group and Universal Brand Development had announced the six sets were released in April as well consisting of Pteranodon Chase, T. rex Dinosaur Breakout, Atrociraptor Dinosaur Bike Chase, Blue & Beta Velociraptor Capture, Quetzalcoatlus Plane Ambush and T. rex & Atrociraptor Dinosaur Breakout. Another largest set will be released as well named Giganotosaurus & Therizinosaurus Attack. Each of the sets included Lego minifigures of Rainn Delacourt, Kayla Watts and Soyona Santos. In addition, Dinosaur Market polybag set was released as a promotion.

In 2023, five sets based on the original Jurassic Park film for its 30th anniversary are to be released June 2023. The five sets are Velociraptor Escape, Dilophosaurus Ambush, Triceratops Research, Brachiosaurus Discovery and Visitor Center: T. rex & Raptor Attack. Each of the sets included Lego minifigures of Dr. Alan Grant, Dr. Ellie Sattler, Robert Muldoon, John Hammond, Dr. Ian Malcom, Dennis Nedry, Dr. Henry Wu, Ray Arnold, Tim Murphy and Lex Murphy.

=== Lego Juniors sets ===
Lego Jurassic World: Fallen Kingdom themed sets have also been produced as part of the Lego Juniors theme and, more recently, as part of its successor product range 4+. These sets were specifically designed to be simpler to build with fewer pieces and slightly larger building elements. The Lego Jurassic World: Fallen Kingdom sets are aimed at children aged four and above, such as Velociraptor: Biplane Rescue Mission set, which is part of the Lego Jurassic World: Legend of Isla Nublar sub-theme.

=== Duplo sets ===
Duplo Jurassic World: Fallen Kingdom themed sets have also been produced as part of the Duplo theme and was released in April 2018. These sets are twice the length, height, and width of traditional Lego bricks, making them easier to handle and less likely to be swallowed by younger children. Despite their size, they are still compatible with traditional Lego bricks. The two sets were Gentle Giants Petting Zoo and T. rex Tower. In 2021, T. rex and Triceratops Dinosaur Breakout set was released in June 2021. The set consists of 36 pieces with 1 minifigure of Owen Grady. The T. rex and Triceratops Dinosaur Breakout sets will be retired on 31 December 2022.

In 2022, Dinosaur Nursery set was released on 17 April 2022 and based on Jurassic World Dominion film. The set consists of 27 pieces with 1 minifigure of Claire Dearing.

=== Lego BrickHeadz sets ===
Several Lego Jurassic World characters have also been released as part of the Lego BrickHeadz theme. A range of Lego Jurassic World: Fallen Kingdom BrickHeadz was announced in April 2018, which included Owen and Blue as buildable characters. The set consists of 234 pieces and 2 baseplates.

== Short films and television series ==
In 2015, four short videos for Lego Jurassic World were released on YouTube, including A Jarring Encounter, A Day in the Life, Jurassic Pals, and Little Arms...Big Feet.

Lego Jurassic World: The Indominus Escape was released in October 2016, initially as a five-part series of online videos. It was released on DVD later that month as a 24-minute short film. It is a prequel to Jurassic World, and follows most of the film's characters as they try to capture a hot dog-loving Indominus rex. It is the first animated spin-off project in the Jurassic Park franchise. The home media release was accompanied by another short prequel, titled Lego Jurassic World: Employee Safety Video.

In promotion of Jurassic World: Fallen Kingdom, Lego produced two short films titled Rescue Blue and Escape the Indoraptor, with a variant featured on YouTube where it was separated into four parts, and at the end of each part the audience was given the option to choose between two different outcomes.

Lego Jurassic World: The Secret Exhibit is a prequel to Jurassic World. It aired on NBC on November 29, 2018.

Lego Jurassic World: Legend of Isla Nublar is a 13-episode animated miniseries that premiered in 2019. The series is also a prequel to Jurassic World, chronicling the park operations. A two-part special for the series, titled Lego Jurassic World: Double Trouble, premiered in 2020.

Lego Jurassic World: Keep Your Dinosaurs Safe is a web short released on YouTube in 2020. It features Owen and Blue teaching about the symptoms of COVID-19 and how to stay safe.

In May 2023, seven short videos for Lego Jurassic World were released on YouTube, including A dinosaur in a supermarket, Dinosaurs are among us!, A baby Velociraptor on a rescue mission, A hunt for a Giganotosaurus, Dinosaurs at a construction site Dinosaurs in the streets and Velociraptor at a farm.

In June 2023, six short videos for Lego Jurassic Park 30th anniversary were released on YouTube that inspired by both Lego Jurassic Park 30th anniversary sets as well as Jurassic Park film.

Lego Jurassic Park: The Unofficial Retelling is a short film released on Peacock in October 2023. It features Dr. Ian Malcolm tells the story (in his point of view) of the time he, Alan Grant and Ellie Sattler were invited by John Hammond for a tour of Jurassic Park, however through the meddlings of Dennis Nedry, the power to the park is shutdown in which they all have to survive the escaped dinosaurs and get the power back online in order to call for help. The short plays exactly like the film except for some interpretations to make it suitable for children, that includes the deaths of the characters such as Robert Muldoon and Dennis Nedry (who are allegedly having tea with the dinosaurs and never seen again), especially the demise of Donald Gennaro and Ray Arnold (who had survived near the end of the film when the power came back and called the chopper). As the story ended, Dr. Malcolm wants to read his role in Isla Sorna, but his neighbor (who looks a lot like Steven Spielberg) snatched his book and ran away with Ian trying to get it back.

== Video games ==
A video game, Lego Jurassic World, was released in June 2015, coinciding with the film. It was the latest in a series of Lego-branded video games, and is based on the first four films in the Jurassic Park franchise. It is an action-adventure game, developed by Traveller's Tales and published by Warner Bros. Interactive Entertainment. It was initially released across numerous game platforms, and was later released for Android and iOS in 2016. A Nintendo Switch version was released in 2019.

Two other games feature elements relating to Jurassic World. Lego Dimensions (2015) has a "team pack" that recreates the events of the film and adds Owen Grady, ACU Trooper and a Velociraptor as playable characters. Lego Brawls (2019) includes Tyrannosaurus rex, Indominus rex, Owen Grady and Claire Dearing as playable characters.

== Books ==
Numerous books based on Lego Jurassic World have been written:

- LEGO Jurassic World : Prima Official Game Guide. Authored by Rick Barba. Published by Dorling Kindersley, 2015. ISBN 1-10189-852-6
- LEGO Jurassic World: Owen's Guide to Survival. Authored by Meredith Rusu. Published by Scholastic Inc., 2018. ISBN 1-33823-802-7
- Lego Jurassic World: Sticker Activity. Published by Centum Books, 2018. ISBN 1-91270-777-2
- Dinosaur Disaster! (Lego Jurassic World: Reader with Stickers). Authored by Meredith Rusu. Published by Scholastic Inc., 2018. ISBN 1-33823-801-9
- Owen to the Rescue (Lego Jurassic World: Reader with Stickers). Authored by Meredith Rusu. Published by Scholastic Inc., 2019. ISBN 1-33853-920-5
- Lego Jurassic World : Activity Book with Minifigure. Authored by Ameet Studio. Published by Scholastic Inc., 2019. ISBN 978-1-33838-743-8
- Owen's Jurassic Logbook (with Owen minifigure and mini Blue Raptor). Published by Scholastic Inc., 2019. ISBN 1-33853-804-7
- Dino Heroes (with bonus story Owen to the Rescue). Published by Scholastic Inc., 2020. ISBN 1-40719-880-7
- Dinosaur Discovery. Authored by Ameet Studio. Published by Scholastic Inc., 2020. ISBN 1-33858-194-5
- Lego Jurassic World: Dinosaurs on the Run!. Authored by Editors of Studio Fun International. Published by Sfi Readerlink Dist., 2020. ISBN 0-79444-521-7
- Jurassic World Build Your Own Adventure. Authored by Julia March and Selina Wood. Published by Dorling Kindersley, 2020. ISBN 1-46549-327-1
- LEGO Jurassic World: 1001 Stickers: Amazing Dinosaurs. Authored by AMEET. Published by Michael O'Mara Books Ltd., 2020. ISBN 1-78055-758-2
- Lego Jurassic World the Dino Files : With Lego Jurassic World Claire Minifigure and Baby Raptor!. Authored by Catherine Saunders. Published by Dorling Kindersley, 2021. ISBN 0-74402-853-1
- Lego Jurassic World Ultimate Sticker Collection. Authored by Julia March. Published by Dorling Kindersley, 2021. ISBN 0-74402-854-X
- Lego Jurassic World: Let's Paint Dinosaurs. Authored by Ameet Studios. Published by Studio Fun International, 2021. ISBN 0-79444-717-1
- LEGO (R) Jurassic World (TM): Alan Grant's Missions: Activity Book with Alan Grant minifigure. Authored by Buster Books. Published by Michael O'Mara Books Ltd., 2022. ISBN 1-78055-877-5
- Untold Dinosaur Tales #1: Dangerous Eggs-pedition! (LEGO Jurassic World). Authored by Random House. Published by Random House USA Inc, 2022. ISBN 0-59348-297-2
- Untold Dinosaur Tales #2: Camp Chaos! (LEGO Jurassic World). Authored by Random House. Published by Random House USA Inc., 2022. ISBN 0-59356-881-8

== Popular culture references ==
In the 2019 film The Lego Movie 2: The Second Part, were the main character Emmet teams up with Rex Dangervest who had six raptors named Cobra, Rocky, Quaid, Ripley, Connor, and The Other One, Emmet seems to love raptors since his voice actor Chris Pratt who played Owen in the Jurassic World films and made a possible reference to how Owen trains and kept velociraptors.

== Reception ==
In May 2015, The Lego Group reported that the Lego Star Wars, Lego Jurassic World and Lego Technic themes had contributed to its first half results jump 18 per cent for 2015.

In September 2015, The Lego Group reported that the Lego Elves and Lego Jurassic World lines, "were received very positively by children all over the world", and that these themes had helped to push revenue up by 23 per cent.

In November 2015, the Toy Retailers Association listed the Raptor Rampage set on its official list of Dream Toys 2015.

In 2019, T-rex vs Dino-Mech Battle set was listed as one of the best toys for the 2019 Holiday season in Parents Magazine.

== Awards and nominations ==
In 2015, Raptor Rampage was awarded "DreamToys" in the Build It And They Will Thrive category by the Toy Retailers Association.

In 2018, Blue's Helicopter Pursuit was awarded "DreamToys" in the It's Showtime category by the Toy Retailers Association.

In 2022, Blue & Beta Velociraptor Capture was awarded "DreamToys" in the Film & TV Favourites category by the Toy Retailers Association.

== See also ==
- Lego Studios
- Lego Adventurers
- Lego Dino
- Lego Monster Fighters
- Lego Trolls World Tour
- Lego Minions: The Rise of Gru
- Lego Vidiyo
- Lego Gabby's Dollhouse
