= Lego Trolls World Tour =

Lego theme

- Subject: Trolls World Tour
- Licensed from: DreamWorks Animation and Universal Pictures
- Availability: January 2020–July 2021
- Total sets: 9 (including promotional set)
- Characters: Poppy, Barb, Biggie, Branch, Cloud Guy, Cooper, Guy Diamond, Funk Troll (Female), Hickory, Tiny Diamond, Mr. Dinkles, Hickory and Mermaid
- Official website

Lego Trolls World Tour is a discontinued Lego theme based on the film of the same name created by Thomas Dam. It is licensed by Universal Pictures and DreamWorks Animation. The theme was introduced in January 2020 and was discontinued by the end of July 2021.

== Overview ==
Lego Trolls World Tour was based on the Trolls World Tour film. The product line focuses on the Poppy and Branch who discover that there are several more troll tribes which represent music genres to their own. Troubles arise when the Queen of the Rock tribe plans to overthrow the foreign music genres to unite the trolls under rock music. Along with a few friends, Poppy and Branch set out on a mission to unite the trolls and save the diverse melodies from extinction. Lego Trolls World Tour aimed to recreate the main characters in Lego form, including Poppy, Barb, Biggie, Branch, Cloud Guy, Cooper, Guy Diamond, Funk Troll (Female), Hickory, Tiny Diamond, Mr. Dinkles, Hickory and Mermaid.

== Development ==
Lego Trolls World Tour was based on the Trolls World Tour film. The Lego construction toy range was based on the animated film and developed in collaboration with Universal Brand Development. The construction sets were designed to recreate the story and characters of the DreamWorks Animation film franchise in Lego form.

== Launch ==
The Lego Trolls World Tour theme was launched at the American International Toy Fair in 2020. As part of the marketing campaign, The Lego Group released seven toy sets based on the film. Each set featured a different dance party, pod or stage concert. Minifigures were also released, including Poppy, Barb, Biggie, Branch, Cloud Guy, Cooper, Guy Diamond, Funk Troll (Female), Hickory, Tiny Diamond, Mr. Dinkles, Hickory and Mermaid.

== Characters ==
- Poppy: The sweet and optimistic Queen of the Pop Trolls and Branch's love interest (later girlfriend).
- Barb: The feisty and misguided Queen of the Hard Rock Trolls.
- Biggie: A large, timid Pop Troll who accompanies Poppy and Branch on their journey.
- Branch: A cautious but kindly survivalist Pop Troll who is Poppy's best friend (later boyfriend).
- Cloud Guy: An eccentric anthropomorphic cloud that serves as the narrator of the opening prologue.
- Cooper: A Pop Troll who discovers he is really a long-lost prince of the Funk Trolls.
- Guy Diamond: A glittery, naked Pop Troll with a highly auto-tuned voice who is Tiny Diamond's single father.
- Hickory: A Yodel Troll disguised as a Country Troll and one of the many bounty hunters hired by Barb.
- Tiny Diamond: A baby glittery Hip-Hop Troll and Guy Diamond's rapping newborn son.
- Mr. Dinkles: Biggie's pet worm.
- Mermaid: A purple mer-Troll and Techno dance expert.

== Construction sets ==
According to BrickLink, The Lego Group released a total of 9 Lego sets and promotional polybag as part of Lego Trolls World Tour theme. The product line was eventually discontinued by the end of July 2021.

In 2020, The Lego Group created a partnership with DreamWorks Animation. It was officially announced by The Lego Group that seven sets based on the Trolls World Tour film was released on 1 January 2020. The seven sets being released were Techno Reef Dance Party (set number: 41250), Poppy's Pod (set number: 41251), Poppy's Air Balloon Adventure (set number: 41252), Lonesome Flats Raft Adventure (set number: 41253), Volcano Rock City Concert (set number: 41254), Pop Village Celebration (set number: 41255) and Rainbow Caterbus (set number: 41256). Later, Vibe City Concert (set number: 41258) was released on 1 August 2020. In addition, Poppy's Carriage (set number: 30555) polybag set was released as a promotion. These included two key chains attached to the minifigures of Poppy and Branch. The sets were designed primarily for children with an age rating of 4+ or above.

=== Techno Reef Dance Party ===
Techno Reef Dance Party (set number: 41250) was released on 1 January 2020. The set consists of 159 pieces with 1 minifigure. The dance party included speakers, strobe lights, a dancefloor and a DJ booth. It also included variety of accessories and octopus. The set included Lego minifigure of Mermaid.

=== Poppy's Pod ===
Poppy's Pod (set number: 41251) was released on 1 January 2020. The set consists of 103 pieces with 1 minifigure. The pod-shaped house included a bed, a small drawer to store the accessories and sink. It also included variety of accessories. The small waterfall included treasure chest containing a map. Poppy's hair can take a swing with the fabric flower. The set included Lego minifigure of Poppy. This set is specifically designed to be simpler to build with fewer pieces and slightly larger building elements. This set can combine with Pop Village Celebration (set number: 41255).

=== Poppy's Air Balloon Adventure ===
Poppy's Air Balloon Adventure (set number: 41252) was released on 1 January 2020. The set consists of 250 pieces with 3 minifigures. A pink hot air balloon included a golden chain can connect to bucket, control panel and variety of accessories. The metronome containing a musical string. The set included Lego minifigures of Poppy, Branch and Biggie with Mr. Dinkles. The accessories can store in Branch's hair.

=== Lonesome Flats Raft Adventure ===
Lonesome Flats Raft Adventure (set number: 41253) was released on 1 January 2020. The set consists of 173 pieces with 3 minifigures. The Flats Raft included a stage, floatable raft and jail with an opening door. It also included variety of accessories and a bar that allow Poppy can swing with her hair. The set included Lego minifigures of Branch, Hickory and Poppy. This set is specifically designed to be simpler to build with fewer pieces and slightly larger building elements.

=== Volcano Rock City Concert ===
Volcano Rock City Concert (set number: 41254) was released on 1 January 2020. The set consists of 387 pieces with 3 minifigures. The stage concert included 3 guitars, 2 microphones, 2 musical strings and variety of accessories. The set included Lego minifigures of Barb, Branch and Poppy. The accessories can store in Branch's hair.

=== Pop Village Celebration ===
Pop Village Celebration (set number: 41255) was released on 1 January 2020. The set consists of 380 pieces with 5 minifigures. The Pop Village included tree house, a kitchen with an oven and tree hang two pods. It also included variety of accessories. The set included Lego minifigures of Branch, Cooper, Guy Diamond, Poppy and Tiny Diamond. The accessories can store in Branch's hair and Guy Diamond's hair. This set can combine with Poppy's Pod (set number: 41251).

=== Rainbow Caterbus ===
Rainbow Caterbus (set number: 41256) was released on 1 January 2020. The set consists of 395 pieces with 6 minifigures. The Caterbus included driver's steering wheel and the detachable roof to place all 3 minifigures inside. The bus stop included swinging seat, a bar that allow Poppy can swing with her hair and variety of accessories. The set included Lego minifigures of Cloud Guy, Cooper, Poppy and 3 cloud babies.

=== Vibe City Concert ===
Vibe City Concert (set number: 41258) was released on 1 August 2020. The set consists of 494 pieces with 5 minifigures. The stage concert included DJ booth, microphones and a recording room. It also included a keyboard, 2 guitars, tuba, trumpet and variety of accessories. The set included Lego minifigures of Poppy, Branch, Cooper, Funk Troll (Female) and Hickory. The accessories can store in Branch's hair.

=== Poppy's Carriage ===
Poppy's Carriage (set number: 30555) was released on 1 January 2020 as a free gift for qualify purchase of Lego Trolls World Tour sets. The polybag set consists of 51 pieces with 1 minifigure. "Treat little Trolls fans to a journey aboard Poppy’s insect-powered carriage. They’ll love moving the cute insect legs and can discover lots of accessories in the chest!" The set included a Lego minifigure of Poppy.

== Web short ==
=== Just Sing (2020 Short) ===
On 9 November 2020, Universal Brand Development and The LEGO Group launched an official music video that was released on YouTube. It features the film's theme song, "Just Sing" and includes characters from the Trolls World Tour film in Lego form. The song is performed by Justin Timberlake, Anna Kendrick, Kelly Clarkson, Mary J. Blige, Anderson Paak and Kenan Thompson.

== See also ==
- Trolls (franchise)
- Trolls World Tour (soundtrack)
- Lego Monster Fighters
- Lego Jurassic World (theme)
- Lego Minions: The Rise of Gru
- Lego Vidiyo
- Lego Gabby's Dollhouse
- Lego The Lone Ranger
