= Lego Wild West =

Lego theme

- Other names: Lego Western
- Sub‑themes: Indians, Cowboys
- Subject: Cowboys and Indians
- Availability: 1996–1997
- Total sets: 16

Lego Wild West (or Western) is a discontinued Lego theme based on the Old West period of the United States. It was in production for only two years, from 1996 to 1997.

== Background ==
Inspired by the Spaghetti Westerns of the 1960s and 1970s, the Wild West theme was one of the first themes to appear in Lego sets. Toy sets such as Wild West Scene (365), released in 1975, and Western Train (726), released in 1976 were early examples of this experimentation. However, it was not until 1996 that a complete Lego product range emerged based on a Western theme.

== Release ==
The Wild West sets were introduced in the late summer of 1996. In Europe, the theme was released in August 1996 and in North America it was released in September 1996. The Indians sets came out in 1997. After that, the Wild West sets were discontinued. In 2002, three Wild West sets (Sheriff's Lock-up, Fort Legoredo, and Rapid River Village) were re-released.

== Construction sets ==
A total of 16 toy sets were released from 1996 to 1997 as part of the Wild West theme. Various minifigures were introduced, including wranglers, sheriffs, US Cavalry, bandits and Indians.

=== 1996 sets ===
The first wave of sets centred on a battle between cowboys, bandits and the US Cavalry at Legoredo Town. Several toy sets focused on the town sheriff, including Sheriff's Lock-up and Sheriff's Showdown. The larger sets of the series were Bandits' Secret Hideout and Fort Legoredo.

Reference	Name	Released	Minifigures	Notes
6712	Sheriff's Showdown	1996	Sheriff, Black Bart	1997 in North America
6716	Weapons Wagon	1996	Soldier	1997 in North America
6755/6764	Sheriff's Lock-up	1996	Wrangler, Sheriff, Flatfoot Thompson, Dewey Cheatum	Re-released in 2001
6761	Bandits' Secret Hideout	1996	Flatfoot Thompson, Black Bart, Dewey Cheatum, Soldiers (Two)	
6762/6769	Fort Legoredo	1996	Soldiers (Six), Flatfoot Thompson, Black Bart, Dewey Cheatum, Wrangler	Re-released in 2001
6765	Gold City Junction	1996	Banker, Soldier, Black Bart, Wrangler, Sheriff, Saloon Chief	

=== 1997 sets ===
In 1997, the theme released toy sets that centred on the First Nations people living in Rapid River Village, which featured a river, two tipi, a totem pole, a canoe and horses.

Reference	Name	Released	Minifigures	Notes
6706	Frontier Patrol	1997	Soldiers (Three)	
6790/6791	Bandit's Wheel Gun	1997	Black Bart	
6799	Showdown Canyon	1997	Wrangler, Sheriff, Flatfoot Thompson, Black Bart	
2845	Indian Chief	1997	Indian Mystic	
2846	Indian Kayak	1997	Indian Warrior	
6709	Tribal Chief	1997	Indian Chief	
6718	Rain Dance Ridge	1997	Indian Mystic, Indian Warrior	
6746	Chief's Tepee	1997	Indian Warriors (Two), Indian Chief	
6748	Boulder Cliff Canyon	1997	Indian Warriors (Five), Indian Mystic	
6763/6766	Rapid River Village	1997	Indian Warrior (Five), Indian Chief, Wrangler	Re-released in 2001

== Attractions ==
In 1973, LEGOREDO Town was introduced to Legoland Billund Resort. The themed area of the park was expanded from an Indian camp that had existed since the opening of the park in 1968. LEGOREDO Town featured a variety of Wild West themed Lego constructions, including a figure of Sitting Bull and the heads of four US presidents at Mount Rushmore. The attractions of the themed land include LEGOLDMINE, where visitors pan for gold, Lego Canoe and a rollercoaster named the Flying Eagle.

== Legacy ==
The Wild West sets were the first to include toy revolvers and rifles, which were later used in the Adventurers sets. Although the Castle, Space and Pirate themes had included a variety of weaponry, such as crossbows, lasers and swords, handguns in contemporary themes had never been featured. The Wild West theme was also the first theme to include plastic snakes. The sets also marked the first instance where the perpetual smile on the minifigure heads was replaced with various other facial expressions.

== Reception ==
In 2018, Bandit's Wheelgun (set number: 6791), Gold City Junction (set number: 6765), Covered Wagon (set number: 6716) and Fort Legoredo (set number: 6769) were listed in the "Top 10 Western LEGO Sets" by Lego fansite BricksFanz.

== See also ==
- The Lego Movie (Lego theme)
- Lego The Lone Ranger
- Lego Toy Story
- Lego Brawls
