= Lego Brawls =

2019 video game

- Developer: Red Games Co.
- Publisher: Lego Games
- Engine: Unity
- Platforms: iOS macOS tvOS; Microsoft Windows; Nintendo Switch; PlayStation 4 PlayStation 5 Xbox One; Xbox Series X/S
- Release: iOS, tvOS, macOS; September 19, 2019; Windows, Switch, PS4, PS5, Xbox One, Xbox Series X/S; September 2, 2022
- Genre: Fighting
- Mode: Multiplayer

Lego Brawls is a 2022 fighting game developed and published by Lego Games in partnership with American studio Red Games Co., and is being distributed in physical format for consoles by Bandai Namco Entertainment. LEGO Brawls was released for Apple Arcade on September 19, 2019, for iOS mobile devices, macOS, and tvOS. LEGO Brawls was the first LEGO game for Apple Arcade. The game was released for Microsoft Windows, Nintendo Switch, PlayStation 4, PlayStation 5, Xbox One, and Xbox Series X/S on September 2, 2022.

== Gameplay ==
Lego Brawls is a family-friendly platform fighter. Each LEGO themed level offers different game modes, unique challenges, and win conditions. During multiplayer online play, players can compete 4v4 to control the point, gather collectibles in Collect Mode levels, play a battle royale-style game, or have a free-for-brawl where the last player standing wins. In Party Mode, players can play private games with friends locally or online. With cross-platform support, players can team up and compete, regardless of their game system.

Lego Brawls allows the player to create their own "hero" to their liking with their own weapons and power-ups. As the player plays, the player will be rewarded with mystery chests that contain either a cosmetic element or a combat element. Mystery bags were later introduced that could also reward characters and weapons after playing a certain number of battles over three tiers, Common (3), Rare (5) and Epic (10).

The collection of playable minifigure characters is based on recognizable Lego minifigures that have been released throughout Lego history either as part of Lego construction sets, as collectible minifigures or as part of one of the Lego themes. Minifigures are grouped into different types and include Classic Space, Pirates, Alien Conquest, Castle, Western, Ninjago, Hidden Side, Jurassic World, Vidiyo, and Monkie Kid. "Event" themes are also available, such as a Halloween-themed "Brick or Treat" theme and Christmas-themed "Jingle Brawls" theme. A new mode named "Base Race".

== Development and release ==
Lego Brawls was developed by Red Games.

Lego Games Vice President Sean William McEvoy said that the game was developed for families to enjoy: "Having grown up playing with Lego, we were inspired to make Lego Brawls something that families could play together. Apple Arcade is the perfect venue for this shared experience. Whether they're playing on iPhones in separate locations or sitting next to each other in front of an Apple TV, players of all ages can enjoy the fun of Lego Brawls anywhere at any time."

Lego Brawls was announced to be an Apple Arcade game exclusive during Apple's March 26 event. The trailer was released later that day. On October 25, 2019, Lego Brawls was released on macOS. Lego Brawls was released for Microsoft Windows, Nintendo Switch, PlayStation 4, PlayStation 5, Xbox One, and Xbox Series X/S on September 2, 2022.

== Reception ==
Reception

Aggregate score
Aggregator	Score
Metacritic	PS5: 46/100; XSXS: 67/100

Review scores
Publication	Score
MeriStation	4.5/10
Nintendo Life	4/10
Push Square	3/10
The Games Machine (Italy)	7/10
Multiplayer.it	IOS: 7.5/10; XSXS: 6.5/10

Lego Brawls received "generally unfavorable" reviews for PlayStation 5 according to review aggregator website Metacritic; the Xbox Series X/S version received "mixed or average" reviews. Metacritic listed Lego Brawls as the fifth-worst game of 2022. Lego Brawls has drawn comparisons to Nintendo's Super Smash Bros.. Multiplayer. it said of the iOS version, "it's fun... but only if you use a controller." Push Square were more critical in their criticism in their review, stating, "Gameplay is a never-ending slog, a grindy system to unlock parts". They also criticized the gameplay, AI and sound. Similarly, Nintendo Life called it shallow and repetitive, while mentioning the poor camera and "stuttering performance on Switch".

Chris Morris for Common Sense Media gave the game a four out of five star rating and commented, "The controls are a bit hard to grasp at first, though. Swiping a screen and fighting can be a challenging combination, which may make you want to use a game controller instead. At least there's a solo level, allowing you to practice those skills, which will give you a better chance in an actual game. It's a notable concern, but it's one that diminishes as you log extra time breaking apart rival Legos. Lego Brawls is one of those fun title that kids and parents can gather around a tablet or phone and have a great time fighting and laughing over."

In 2020, Lego Brawls was the 10th most-downloaded game on Apple Arcade. In the United Kingdom, it debuted at number 30 on the physical sales chart for the week ending September 3, 2022.
