= BrickLink Designer Program =

Crowdfunding program by BrickLink

- Other names: Designer Program
- Availability: 2024–present
- Total sets: 45
- Official website

The BrickLink Designer Program, now known simply as the Designer Program, is a crowdfunding program ran through BrickLink where a selection of sets designed by Lego fans are produced for a limited time.

Builders use BrickLink Studio to create models which are then submitted for a voting process and review, after which five designs are selected. The designs are then crowdfunded into production and pre-ordered for a limited period of time.

== History and production ==
In December 2022, BrickLink announced that the program would begin with Series 1 in 2023. Builders use BrickLink Studio to create models which are then submitted. After a voting process and review, five designs are selected, which are then crowdfunded into production and pre-ordered for a limited period of time. Pre-order for the first series began in 2024. Some designs rejected from Series 1 had their instructions sold as part of a program called the MOC Pop-Up Store.

In 2025, production numbers for Series 5 saw a capacity increase beyond the usual 30,000. The program has become notable for the popularity of medieval and Lego Castle-themed builds within it.

== Sets ==
=== Series 1 ===
The first series of the BrickLink Designer Program began pre-ordering in February 2024.

Set number	Name	Part count
910029	Mountain Fortress	3995
910030	Snack Shack	539
910031	General Store	1906
910032	Parisian Street	3532
910033	Old Train Engine Shed	2331

=== Series 2 ===
Set number	Name	Part count
910034	Brick Cross Train Station	3050
910035	Logging Railway	2731
910036	Ocean House	2207
910037	Mushroom House	964
910038	Ominous Isle	2809

=== Series 3 ===
Set number	Name	Part count
910039	The Art of Chocolate	2615
910040	Harbourmaster's Office	2418
910041	Camping Adventure	669
910042	Lost City	3506
910043	Forest Stronghold	3395

=== Series 4 ===
Set number	Name	Part count
910044	Wild West Train	3192
910045	Siege Encampment	2598
910046	Merchant Boat	2180
910047	Medieval Seaside Market	2560
910048	Riverside Scholars	2769

=== Series 5 ===
Set number	Name	Part count
910049	Adventure in Transylvania	4056
910050	Antique Shop	1918
910051	Mushroom Village	2436
910052	Popcorn Wagon	594
910053	The Thieves of Tortuga	4002

=== Series 6 ===
Set number	Name	Part count
910054	The Art Factory	2256
910055	Gold Mine Expedition	3382
910056	Off-Road Adventure	978
910057	Outlaw Forest Den	2618
910058	Sequoia Tree Trail	3187

=== Series 7 ===
Set number	Name	Part count
910059	Privateer Frigate Fortuna	4087
910060	Sushi Restaurant	3604
910061	Antique Collection	1504
910062	Alchemist's Shop	2319
910063	W.A.L.T.	654

=== Series 8 ===
Set number	Name	Part count
910064	Dustmark Keep	3960
910065	Coconut Cape	2384
910066	Brick Railroad Locomotive	1348
910067	Hot Air Balloon	883
910068	University of Science	3991

=== Series 9 ===
Set number	Name	Part count
910069	Fisherman's Village	4027
910070	Sleepy Dragon Inn	3121
910071	Wild West Blacksmith	2533
910072	Woodbrick Freight Depot	2252
910073	Pumpkin Patch	613
