= Rebrickable =

Online Lego design platform

- Official logo

- Screenshot Screenshot of Rebrickable as of February 2026
- Country of origin: Australia
- Creator: Nathan Thom
- Website: rebrickable.com
- Users: 2.2 million (as of November 1, 2026)
- Launched: 2011

Rebrickable is an online platform where users post and sell instructions for custom Lego designs, known as "My Own Creations" (MOCs), as well as alternate builds of sets.

The website also contains a database with information on different Lego sets and parts. It was started by Nathan Thom in 2011 and has over two million users.

== Overview and features ==
Users on Rebrickable are able to sell and distribute instructions for custom builds, known as "My Own Creations" (MOCs), with the buyer obtaining the pieces elsewhere to build it. Creations uploaded to the website also include alternate builds, which reuse parts from existing sets. The website also features a database containing information about different Lego sets and parts, allowing users to see what MOCs they can design with their existing Lego collection.

Rebrickable's database containing information on Lego sets is crowdsourced, with a team of administrators monitoring it to maintain its accuracy. Among the projects developed by them was RebrickNet, an artificial intelligence system for identifying Lego parts in photographs.

== History ==
Rebrickable was founded by Nathan Thom in 2011; initially, it was primarily meant to index Lego Technic sets. Thom told the American technology magazine Popular Mechanics in March 2020 that "I began Rebrickable because I had thousands of pieces I collected from sets and wondered if there was something else, already designed, I could build with them". The website went through major updates in 2014 and 2017. In 2017, a similar platform known as MOCPlans was merged with Rebrickable after it was shut down.

The website hosted over 15,000 MOCs by 2020, and as of 2026, now hosts more than 200,000. According to the business newspaper Australian Financial Review, designs for ships, trains and large buildings are particularly popular.

== See also ==
- BrickLink
