= Lego Digital Designer =

Discontinued computer-aided design software

- Screenshot Building a creation in version 2.3.15 of Lego Digital Designer
- Original author: Qube Software
- Developer: The Lego Group
- Release: 24 July 2003; 23 years ago
- Final release: 4.3.12 / 2019
- Platform: Microsoft Windows; MacOS
- Available in: English, German
- Type: Computer-aided design
- License: Closed source (Freeware)
- Website: ldd.lego.com

Lego Digital Designer is a discontinued computer-aided design developed by Qube Software and the Lego Group for both Windows and Mac that allowed allowed users to virtually design Lego creations.

Released in 2003, Lego Digital Designer was originally connected with the Lego Design byME program, where users could order physical versions of designs they built on it.

Although the Design byME program was later shut down, the software remained available until 2022, when it was retired in favor of BrickLink Studio.

== Overview ==
Lego Digital Designer was available for both Microsoft Windows and MacOS users. The software interface is divided into three building modes: the standard one, an extended version, and a mode for designing Mindstorms creations. The extended mode provides users with a more advanced parts selection, with the same parts being available in many different colors.

Users can select parts from the sidebar, which are divided into different categories depending on what type of part they are, to add them to the build in the main grid. After users are finished designing their creations, they can then generate instructions for them, as well as view them in front of background images showing different landscapes.

Originally, the software was connected with a program known as Lego Factory (later renamed to Lego Design byME), which allowed users to upload their own custom creations to the Lego website and then order them from the company, who would gather the parts for the build and ship them in a specialized box. However, the program was not considered to be the most successful, and was shut down in January 2012.

== History ==
The history of Lego Digital Designer dates back to the mid-1990s, when Dent-de-Lion du Midi, from Switzerland, created a proof-of-concept video with his friends showcasing digital recreations of Lego bricks. The film was shown to the Lego Group, who received it positively, and in response decided to launch Strategic Product Unit Darwin, a division that would focus on researching further digital ventures, including the creation of a virtual database of Lego parts. However, such a project proved difficult, and SPU Darwin was shut down several years later.

In the meantime, Lego Media International, another division of the company, began collaborating with developer Superscape on Lego Creator, a sandbox video game that allowed users to virtually construct Lego. Following the release of the game, the company began to work on several sequels. The last of the sequels, Creator: Harry Potter and the Chamber of Secrets, was created by a different developer, Qube Software.

As part of their collaboration with the new developer, a more general system of digitally designing Lego was to be developed. The project became Lego Digital Designer, which was officially released in July 2003. According to the company, the software was designed to be easy to use and similar to a video game despite not being one. The initial version of the software contained about 500 different elements, many of which were borrowed from the prior video game.

The Lego Factory program was added with the software in August 2005. When reviewing the software that year, Neil J. Rubenking of PCMag was critical, calling the user interface "awkward" and finding larger models to be "unwieldy" to handle. Around this time, interest began to grow within the Lego Group about bringing the software in-house and having them fully take over development, leading to Qube Software's departure from the project. After taking over development, the company decided to retire the original software engine and create a new one from scratch, releasing it as part of version 2.0 in 2007.

Several specialized versions of the software were created for different areas of the company, including one for model designers at Legoland parks. One of the specialized versions, LDD Hollywood, was specifically created for the production of The Lego Movie, where large-scale models were needed.

== Discontinuation ==
In 2016, it was announced that regular support for Lego Digital Designer would be ending, with the company focusing their resources on other ventures. However, the software still continued to be downloadable. with one last update being released in 2019.

The Lego Group announced Lego Digital Designer's retirement in January 2022, with BrickLink Studio, which was developed by BrickLink in 2016, replacing it as the official Lego building software going forward. Lego had first gained ownership of Studio after they acquired the company in 2019. The software was subsequently discontinued at the end of that month.

== See also ==
- LDraw
