= BrickLink Studio =

Digital Lego building software

Studio 2.0

- Screenshot
- Other names: Stud.io
- Developer: BrickLink
- Release: December 13, 2016; 9 years ago
- Stable release: v2.26.10_1 / October 27, 2026; 2 days ago
- Written in: C#
- Engine: Unity
- Operating system: Windows; MacOS
- Available in: English
- Type: Computer-aided design
- License: Proprietary
- Website: www.bricklink.com/v3/studio/main.page

BrickLink Studio (also known as Studio 2.0) is a freeware CAD software developed by BrickLink which allows for the creation of virtual 3D models with Lego bricks. It replaced Lego Digital Designer as the official Lego design software.

== History ==
It was released on BrickLink as an open beta on December 13, 2016. The next major update to the program, version 2.0, was released in open beta on July 18, 2018. Multiple features were added to the program, including a photorealistic rendering option, and BrickLink integration for ordering parts to recreate the model physically, as well as the Instruction Maker. The software runs on the game engine Unity.

The software is used in the BrickLink Designer Program, where it serves as the venue through which submitted designs are built. Studio Early Access, a version where new features are released early, also exists.

Initially, Studio for their own parts library silently used LDraw Parts Library, developed by LDraw.org Community under Creative Commons Attribution license. After LDraw.org's admin contacted with the Studio developers the info about use of LDraw has been publicly added to the website and into software.

In 2021, it was revealed that the Eyesight, a render engine of BrickLink Studio, is built from the Cycles renderer source developed by Blender Foundation (at the time, Cycles' source was already under Apache License, allowing it to be included in proprietary software, while Blender's source stays under GPL). But at the same time, BrickLink Studio's proprietary binary included some GPL-licensed source from Blender, at least parts of bf_blenlib source files, which are visible in the Studio binary file via hex editor. Later, the source of Eyesight was released on BrickLink site, as well as the modified sources of POV-Ray, FFmpeg and other software libraries used in Studio.

In January 2022, The Lego Group announced that BrickLink Studio would replace Lego Digital Designer (LDD) as the official Lego building software going forward. The Lego Group has specific dedicated BrickLink Studio builders.

== PartDesigner ==
A companion software, PartDesigner, allows for the design of custom parts which can then be used in Studio. It also supports importing preexisting parts and 3D models, as well as applying decals to both.
