= BrickLink =

Online marketplace owned by the Lego Group

- Current logo

- Screenshot of BrickLink's homepage in October 2026
- Former name: BrickBay (2000–2002)
- Founded: Dan Jezek
- Headquarters: Irvine, California, United States
- Owners: Dan Jezek (2000–2010); Eliska Jezek (2010–2013); NXVM (2013–2019); The Lego Group (2019–present)
- Website: www.bricklink.com
- Users: 1.3 million
- Launched: 19 June 2000

BrickLink is an online marketplace owned by the Lego Group, which acquired it in 2019. The website was originally founded under the name BrickBay by Dan Jezek in 2000; however, the name was changed several years later after a dispute with eBay.

After Jezek's death in 2010, the website was sold to NXVM, a company owned by businessman Kim Jung-ju. The website was later purchased by the Lego Group in 2019. Aside from the main marketplace, BrickLink manages several other ventures, including a digital building software known as BrickLink Studio and a crowdfunding program for designers.

== Overview ==
Described as the "world’s largest online community of [Lego] fans", BrickLink allows users to buy and sell used Lego products such as parts and sets, in a fashion similar to eBay or Facebook. The website also features an extensive database containing information on every single Lego set and part ever produced, (Note: The information in it was originally sourced from earlier databases ran by Lego fans including LDraw.) tools to calculate average and combined prices of items, and a community discussion forum. For every item sold on BrickLink, sellers are required to pay a small fee in return. Lego birds have traditionally been used as mascots for the website.

By the time of BrickLink's acquisition in 2019, it was home to over 10,000 different sellers in over 70 different countries. As of 2026, the website has over 1.3 million registered users. The company is headquartered in Irvine, California.

== History ==
=== Initial history (2000-2019) ===
BrickLink was founded on 19 June 2000 by Dan Jezek, under the name BrickBay. Jezek, who was born in Prague in the modern day Czech Republic, had moved to the United States in 1990 after his father, a well-known mathematician, was employed by the University of Hawaiʻi. After graduating from high school, he began to sell portions of his old Lego collection as a side job, while also gaining experience in web design, which gave him the idea to start a website similar to eBay for other people reselling Lego products. When it was first started, the website only hosted around a dozen stores.

The website's name, however, led to a dispute with eBay. To avoid legal action (as had happened to another website), BrickBay agreed to change their name, and, in February 2002, the website was renamed to BrickLink. According to Jezek's mother Eliska, the new name referred to the "links" community members found to one another through the website. Jezek continued to manage the website as it grew in popularity over the next decade. However, in September 2010, he died unexpectedly. As a result, Eliska took over as CEO. Multiple volunteers also helped run the site.

In June 2013, BrickLink was sold to NXVM, a business operated by South Korean entrepreneur Kim Jung-ju, the owner of gaming company Nexon, and a Lego fan himself. Kim hired a team to maintain the website, which also reportedly began working on a sister website for designers. By that time, the website had surpassed 200,000 registered users. Membership increased by a further 30% in the following year, with over 200 million individual bricks for sale on the website. As of 2014, many of the website's users were from North America. The success of BrickLink has also led to similar websites, including Brick Owl, another marketplace for selling Lego products started by fan Lawrence James.

=== Lego Group ownership (2019-present) ===
In November 2019, it was announced that BrickLink would be acquired by the Lego Group for an undisclosed sum. The company's investments in digital play experiences following disappointing sales results in 2017 as well as a failed gaming deal by Kim earlier that year were both cited as potential factors in the sale. The acquisition also included Sohobricks, a Lego clone brand that was later discontinued in 2020.

Despite some positive opinions, the decision to officially purchase the website also led to backlash from fans, with some believing it was an attempt by the company to take advantage of the community and that prices on items would be increased as a result. Responding to such claims, the Lego Group stated their decision to purchase BrickLink was about helping to strengthen ties with the fan community, not going against it. They also noted that despite them being a subsidiary, BrickLink would still continue to operate independently from their headquarters in the United States. By 2020, BrickLink had over 800,000 registered members from over 200 different countries.

In 2025, the website celebrated its 25th anniversary. That June, it was announced that BrickLink accounts would be merged with those on the Lego Group's own website, Lego.com. Users would be required to do so before the end of the year, or else their accounts would be deactivated. The integration was completed in September.

That December, it was also announced that BrickLink would close marketplace operations in over thirty countries, including those located in parts of Africa, the Middle East, South America, and Asia. The company had previously closed online stores in the Philippines earlier in 2025 due to tax requirements they could not meet. Following negative reactions from members, the original closure date of December was postponed. It eventually took effect in January 2026.

In June 2026, as part of the larger changes to the website, it was announced that BrickLink would receive a rebrand. This included a new logo for the website, updated packaging for BrickLink Designer Program sets, as well as new parrot mascots.

== Projects ==
Integrated into the website's catalogue is BrickLink Studio, a downloadable software first released in 2016 which allows users to virtually design Lego creations and create instructions for those designs, as well as render high-quality images of them. The software was developed by the group of software engineers hired to maintain BrickLink after it was first sold in 2013 to help supplement the website's vast catalogue of parts. This was similar to the Lego Group's own computer-aided design software, Lego Digital Designer. Users on BrickLink are able to browse a public gallery of creations made using it, and can even buy parts to build them in real life. In 2022, BrickLink Studio replaced Lego Digital Designer as the company's official building software.

Although BrickLink did not become a subsidiary of the Lego Group until November 2019, this was not their first collaboration. In 2018, the Lego Group partnered with BrickLink to start the AFOL Designer Program, where sixteen finalist designs created by fans using BrickLink Studio were chosen and then produced in limited quantities through crowdfunding.

In 2021, the company launched a new program, known as the BrickLink Designer Program, this time producing previously rejected Lego Ideas submissions in limited numbers. In January 2023, a new version of the program was created, this time overhauled to allow submissions from all users. As part of the program, five designs are selected, which are then voted on by users and later sold for a limited time on the BrickLink website.

== Security ==
In March 2022, BrickLink temporarily suspended sales to buyers in Europe after one of the platform's partners suffered a "cyber incident". No data was known to have been compromised in the incident, and sales resumed shortly after.

Later that year, security analysts working for Salt Labs published a report revealing they had found multiple vulnerabilities in the website's API that could allow hackers to compromise accounts as well as access internal data. This included a cross-site scripting vulnerability which could allow users to insert malicious code into webpages, as well as a possible way to execute XML external entity and server-side request forgery attacks on a page where users could create inventory lists. After BrickLink was informed, the vulnerabilities were fixed.

On 3 November 2023, the website was temporarily taken offline after the company received a security threat which included a ransom demand. While no evidence of an internal data breach was found, the company believed a small number of accounts had been compromised through credential stuffing. Servers were restored soon after, with users being advised to change their passwords.

On 5 November 2026, BrickLink was taken offline again after "unusual activity" was detected. It was restored a week later, with the company confirming there had been a cyberattack. While some information was breached, including usernames and email addresses, the company did not believe that any passwords or financial information had been accessed. As compensation, BrickLink agreed to waive all seller fees for the remainder of the year. On 19 November, the website was taken offline again.

== See also ==
- LUGNET
- Rebrickable
